= 2025 Berlin ePrix =

Race 13 of 16 of the 2024–25 Formula E season
← Previous race	Next race →
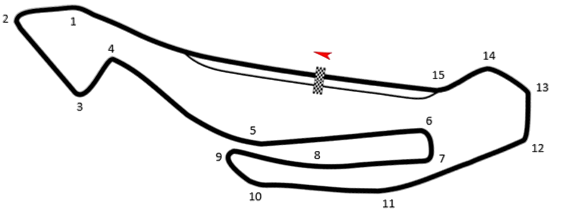

Race details
- Date: 12 July 2025
- Official name: 2025 Hankook Berlin E-Prix
- Location: Tempelhof Airport Street Circuit, Berlin
- Course: Street circuit
- Course length: 2.374 km (1.475 mi)
- Distance: 41 (Note: 39 planned laps + 2 added laps) laps, 97.334 km (60.481 mi)
- Scheduled distance: 39 laps, 92.586 km (57.530 mi)

Pole position
Driver	(New Zealand) Mitch Evans	Jaguar
- Time: 1:11.021

Fastest lap
Driver	(Germany) Pascal Wehrlein	Porsche
- Time: 59.630

Podium
First	(New Zealand) Mitch Evans	Jaguar
Second	(Germany) Pascal Wehrlein	Porsche
Third	(Switzerland) Edoardo Mortara	Mahindra

2025 Berlin ePrix
Race 14 of 16 of the 2024–25 Formula E season
← Previous race	Next race →
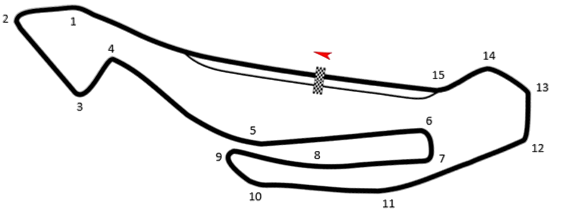

Race details
- Date: 13 July 2025
- Official name: 2025 Hankook Berlin E-Prix
- Location: Tempelhof Airport Street Circuit, Berlin
- Course: Street circuit
- Course length: 2.374 km (1.475 mi)
- Distance: 41 (Note: 38 planned laps + 3 added laps) laps, 97.334 km (60.481 mi)
- Scheduled distance: 38 laps, 90.212 km (56.055 mi)

Pole position
Driver	(Germany) Pascal Wehrlein	Porsche
- Time: 57.850

Fastest lap
Driver	(New Zealand) Nick Cassidy	Jaguar
- Time: 58.917 on lap 37

Podium
First	(New Zealand) Nick Cassidy	Jaguar
Second	(United Kingdom) Jake Dennis	Andretti-Porsche
Third	(France) Jean-Éric Vergne	DS Penske

The 2025 Berlin ePrix, known for sponsorship reasons as the 2025 Hankook Berlin E-Prix, was a pair of Formula E electric car races held at the Tempelhof Airport Street Circuit at Tempelhof Airport in the outskirts of Berlin, Germany on 12 and 13 July 2025. It served as the 11th and 12th rounds of the 2024–25 Formula E season, and marked the 11th edition of the Berlin ePrix, the only event to have featured in every season of the Formula E championship.

== Background ==
Oliver Rowland leads into Berlin with 172 points and a 69-point lead over Pascal Wehrlein. Followed by António Félix da Costa and Taylor Barnard.

=== Driver changes ===
Two drivers would miss the Berlin E-Prix because of a schedule conflict with the FIA World Endurance Championship's 6 Hours of São Paulo. Mahindra Racing's Nyck de Vries would be replaced by Felipe Drugovich. Nissan's reserve driver Sérgio Sette Câmara would replace Norman Nato.

== Classification ==
All times are in CEST.

=== Race one ===
==== Qualification ====
Qualification was originally scheduled to take place at 11:20 AM on 12 July. However, due to adverse weather conditions, the session was postponed to start at 12:00 PM. Due to time constraints, the duels were not held and the group stages were used to decide the starting grid. Because of this the three extra points were not awarded to the driver who obtained pole position.

Group draw
Group A	(United Kingdom) ROW	(Portugal) DAC	(United Kingdom) TIC	(Germany) GUE	(Switzerland) MOR	(United Kingdom) DEN	(Switzerland) MUE	(United Kingdom) BIR	(New Zealand) EVA	(Barbados) MAL	(Brazil) SET
Group B	(Germany) WEH	(United Kingdom) BAR	(France) JEV	(New Zealand) CAS	(Switzerland) BUE	(Belgium) VAN	(United Kingdom) HUG	(Brazil) DIG	(Netherlands) FRI	(Germany) BEC	(Brazil) DRU

===== Overall classification =====
Pos.	No.	Driver	Team	A	B	Grid
1	9	(New Zealand) Mitch Evans	Jaguar	1:11.021	—N/a	1
2	4	(Netherlands) Robin Frijns	Envision	—N/a	1:11.109	2
3	23	(United Kingdom) Oliver Rowland	Nissan	1:12.000	—N/a	3
4	55	(United Kingdom) Jake Hughes	Maserati	—N/a	1:11.344	4
5	7	(Germany) Maximilian Günther	DS Penske	1:12.286	—N/a	5
6	1	(Germany) Pascal Wehrlein	Porsche	—N/a	1:11.538	9 (Note: Wehrlein received a 3-place grid drop for causing a collision with Da Costa in Free Practice 1.)
7	13	(Portugal) António Félix da Costa	Porsche	1:12.973	—N/a	6
8	25	(France) Jean-Éric Vergne	DS Penske	—N/a	1:12.032	7
9	33	(United Kingdom) Dan Ticktum	Cupra Kiro-Porsche	1:13.005	—N/a	8
10	5	(United Kingdom) Taylor Barnard	McLaren-Nissan	—N/a	1:12.437	10
11	48	(Switzerland) Edoardo Mortara	Mahindra	1:13.176	—N/a	11
12	2	(Belgium) Stoffel Vandoorne	Maserati	—N/a	1:12.502	12
13	51	(Switzerland) Nico Müller	Andretti-Porsche	1:13.177	—N/a	13
14	21	(Brazil) Felipe Drugovich	Mahindra	—N/a	1:12.597	20 (Note: Drugovich received a 20-place grid drop for changing his gearbox in excess of the limit.)
15	8	(United Kingdom) Sam Bird	McLaren-Nissan	1:13.220	—N/a	14
16	11	(Brazil) Lucas di Grassi	Lola Yamaha ABT	—N/a	1:12.860	15
17	27	(United Kingdom) Jake Dennis	Andretti-Porsche	1:13.427	—N/a	16
18	37	(New Zealand) Nick Cassidy	Jaguar	—N/a	1:13.448	21 (Note: Cassidy was given a 20-place grid drop for changing his inverters in excess of the limit at the previous race in Jakarta.)
19	22	(Barbados) Zane Maloney	Lola Yamaha ABT	1:13.531	—N/a	17
20	3	(Germany) David Beckmann	Cupra Kiro-Porsche	—N/a	1:13.888	18
21	17	(Brazil) Sérgio Sette Câmara	Nissan	1:14.014	—N/a	19
22	16	(Switzerland) Sébastien Buemi	Envision	—N/a	No Time	22 (Note: Buemi received a 40-place grid drop for changing his MGU and MCU components in excess of the limit.)

==== Race ====
The race took place on 12 July at 4:05 PM.

Pos.	No.	Driver	Team	Laps	Time/Retired	Grid	Points
1	9	(New Zealand) Mitch Evans	Jaguar	41	49:54.398	1	25
2	1	(Germany) Pascal Wehrlein	Porsche	41	+0.469	9	18+1^{1}
3	48	(Switzerland) Edoardo Mortara	Mahindra	41	+10.010	11	15
4	5	(United Kingdom) Taylor Barnard	McLaren-Nissan	41	+10.199	10	12
5	37	(New Zealand) Nick Cassidy	Jaguar	41	+10.319	21	10
6	7	(Germany) Maximilian Günther	DS Penske	41	+11.199	5	8
7	16	(Switzerland) Sébastien Buemi	Envision	41	+12.611	22	6
8	51	(Switzerland) Nico Müller	Andretti-Porsche	41	+13.357	13	4
9	33	(United Kingdom) Dan Ticktum	Cupra Kiro-Porsche	41	+13.771	8	2
10	13	(Portugal) António Félix da Costa	Porsche	41	+14.521 (Note: Da Costa was given a 5-second time penalty for causing a collision with Hughes.)	6	1
11	8	(United Kingdom) Sam Bird	McLaren-Nissan	41	+14.699	14	
12	2	(Belgium) Stoffel Vandoorne	Maserati	41	+14.728	12	
13	4	(Netherlands) Robin Frijns	Envision	41	+15.491	2	
14	55	(United Kingdom) Jake Hughes	Maserati	41	+19.004	4	
15	17	(Brazil) Sérgio Sette Câmara	Nissan	40	+1 Lap (Note: Sette Câmara was given a 10-second time penalty for causing a collision with Beckmann.)	19	
16	22	(Barbados) Zane Maloney	Lola Yamaha ABT	40	+1 Lap	17	
17	21	(Brazil) Felipe Drugovich	Mahindra	40	+1 Lap	20	
18	11	(Brazil) Lucas di Grassi	Lola Yamaha ABT	40	+1 Lap	15	
Ret	23	(United Kingdom) Oliver Rowland	Nissan	32	Collision damage	3	
Ret	25	(France) Jean-Éric Vergne	DS Penske	32	Suspension failure	7	
Ret	3	(Germany) David Beckmann	Cupra Kiro-Porsche	27	Suspension damage	18	
Ret	27	(United Kingdom) Jake Dennis	Andretti-Porsche	0	Power Loss	16	

Notes:

- ^1 – Fastest lap.

==== Standings after the race ====
Drivers' Championship standings

	Pos	Driver	Points
	1	(United Kingdom) Oliver Rowland	172
	2	(Germany) Pascal Wehrlein	122
1	3	(United Kingdom) Taylor Barnard	104
1	4	(Portugal) António Félix da Costa	99
	5	(United Kingdom) Dan Ticktum	82

Teams' Championship standings

	Pos	Team	Points
	1	(Germany) Porsche	221
	2	(Japan) Nissan	191
	3	(United States) DS Penske	153
1	4	(India) Mahindra	136
1	5	(United Kingdom) McLaren	135

Manufacturers' Championship standings

	Pos	Manufacturer	Points
1	1	(Germany) Porsche	320
1	2	(Japan) Nissan	315
1	3	(United Kingdom) Jaguar	244
1	4	(Netherlands) Stellantis	225
	5	(India) Mahindra	162

- Notes: Only the top five positions are included for all three sets of standings.

=== Race two ===
==== Qualification ====
Qualification took place at 11:20 AM on 13 July.

Group draw
Group A	(United Kingdom) ROW	(United Kingdom) BAR	(United Kingdom) TIC	(Germany) GUE	(France) JEV	(United Kingdom) DEN	(Belgium) VAN	(United Kingdom) HUG	(Brazil) DIG	(Barbados) MAL	(Brazil) SET
Group B	(Germany) WEH	(Portugal) DAC	(Switzerland) MOR	(New Zealand) CAS	(Switzerland) BUE	(New Zealand) EVA	(Switzerland) MUE	(United Kingdom) BIR	(Netherlands) FRI	(Germany) BEC	(Brazil) DRU

===== Qualifying duels =====
Quarter-finals
A2	(United Kingdom) Taylor Barnard
A3	(United Kingdom) Dan Ticktum
A1	(Belgium) Stoffel Vandoorne
A4	(United Kingdom) Oliver Rowland
B2	(Portugal) António Félix da Costa
B3	(Netherlands) Robin Frijns
B1	(Germany) Pascal Wehrlein
B4	(Switzerland) Nico Müller

Semi-finals
(United Kingdom) Dan Ticktum
(United Kingdom) Oliver Rowland
(Portugal) António Félix da Costa
(Germany) Pascal Wehrlein

Final
(United Kingdom) Dan Ticktum
(Germany) Pascal Wehrlein

===== Overall classification =====
Pos.	No.	Driver	Team	A	B	QF	SF	F	Grid
1	1	(Germany) Pascal Wehrlein	Porsche	—N/a	59.048	57.855	57.756	57.850	1
2	33	(United Kingdom) Dan Ticktum	Cupra Kiro-Porsche	1:02.115	—N/a	59.027	58.051	58.008	2
3	23	(United Kingdom) Oliver Rowland	Nissan	1:02.621	—N/a	58.921	58.172	—N/a	8 (Note: Rowland received a 5-place grid drop for causing a collision with Vandoorne in Saturday's race at Berlin.)
4	13	(Portugal) António Félix da Costa	Porsche	—N/a	59.353	58.294	58.404	—N/a	3
5	4	(Netherlands) Robin Frijns	Envision	—N/a	59.382	58.382	—N/a	—N/a	4
6	51	(Switzerland) Nico Müller	Andretti-Porsche	—N/a	59.441	58.473	—N/a	—N/a	5
7	2	(Belgium) Stoffel Vandoorne	Maserati	1:01.870	—N/a	59.270	—N/a	—N/a	6
8	5	(United Kingdom) Taylor Barnard	McLaren-Nissan	1:02.051	—N/a	59.633	—N/a	—N/a	7
9	9	(New Zealand) Mitch Evans	Jaguar	—N/a	59.471	—N/a	—N/a	—N/a	9
10	7	(Germany) Maximilian Günther	DS Penske	1:02.633	—N/a	—N/a	—N/a	—N/a	13 (Note: Günther received a 3-place grid drop for failing to respect the black and orange flag in Free Practice 3.)
11	48	(Switzerland) Edoardo Mortara	Mahindra	—N/a	59.506	—N/a	—N/a	—N/a	10
12	55	(United Kingdom) Jake Hughes	Maserati	1:02.645	—N/a	—N/a	—N/a	—N/a	11
13	3	(Germany) David Beckmann	Cupra Kiro-Porsche	—N/a	59.515	—N/a	—N/a	—N/a	12
14	22	(Barbados) Zane Maloney	Lola Yamaha ABT	1:02.663	—N/a	—N/a	—N/a	—N/a	14
15	8	(United Kingdom) Sam Bird	McLaren-Nissan	—N/a	59.519	—N/a	—N/a	—N/a	15
16	27	(United Kingdom) Jake Dennis	Andretti-Porsche	1:02.755	—N/a	—N/a	—N/a	—N/a	16
17	16	(Switzerland) Sébastien Buemi	Envision	—N/a	59.555	—N/a	—N/a	—N/a	17
18	25	(France) Jean-Éric Vergne	DS Penske	1:02.840	—N/a	—N/a	—N/a	—N/a	18
19	21	(Brazil) Felipe Drugovich	Mahindra	—N/a	59.705	—N/a	—N/a	—N/a	19
20	17	(Brazil) Sérgio Sette Câmara	Nissan	1:03.087	—N/a	—N/a	—N/a	—N/a	21 (Note: Sette Câmara received a 3-place grid drop for not following red flag procedures in Free Practice 3.)
21	37	(New Zealand) Nick Cassidy	Jaguar	—N/a	59.728	—N/a	—N/a	—N/a	20
22	11	(Brazil) Lucas di Grassi	Lola Yamaha ABT	No Time	—N/a	—N/a	—N/a	—N/a	22

==== Race ====
The race took place on 13 July at 4:05 PM.

Pos.	No.	Driver	Team	Laps	Time/Retired	Grid	Points
1	37	(New Zealand) Nick Cassidy	Jaguar	41	47:29.430	20	25+1^{2}
2	27	(United Kingdom) Jake Dennis	Andretti-Porsche	41	+1.533	16	18
3	25	(France) Jean-Éric Vergne	DS Penske	41	+4.347	18	15
4	23	(United Kingdom) Oliver Rowland	Nissan	41	+5.258	8	12
5	9	(New Zealand) Mitch Evans	Jaguar	41	+6.791	9	10
6	5	(United Kingdom) Taylor Barnard	McLaren-Nissan	41	+7.185	7	8
7	21	(Brazil) Felipe Drugovich	Mahindra	41	+7.553	19	6
8	13	(Portugal) António Félix da Costa	Porsche	41	+9.072	3	4
9	17	(Brazil) Sérgio Sette Câmara	Nissan	41	+9.546	21	2
10	55	(United Kingdom) Jake Hughes	Maserati	41	+9.918	11	1
11	48	(Switzerland) Edoardo Mortara	Mahindra	41	+11.174	10	
12	11	(Brazil) Lucas di Grassi	Lola Yamaha ABT	41	+11.730	22	
13	2	(Belgium) Stoffel Vandoorne	Maserati	41	+11.945	6	
14	33	(United Kingdom) Dan Ticktum	Cupra Kiro-Porsche	41	+14.398	2	
15	1	(Germany) Pascal Wehrlein	Porsche	41	+15.417	1	3^{1}
16	3	(Germany) David Beckmann	Cupra Kiro-Porsche	41	+16.424	12	
17	51	(Switzerland) Nico Müller	Andretti-Porsche	41	+17.914 (Note: Müller was given a 10-second time penalty for causing a collision with Bird.)	5	
Ret	22	(Barbados) Zane Maloney	Lola Yamaha ABT	38	Problem	14	
Ret	4	(Netherlands) Robin Frijns	Envision	38	Technical	4	
Ret	7	(Germany) Maximilian Günther	DS Penske	35	Power Loss	13	
Ret	8	(United Kingdom) Sam Bird	McLaren-Nissan	22	Collision	15	
Ret	16	(Switzerland) Sébastien Buemi	Envision	18	Technical issue	17	

Notes:

- ^1 – Pole position.
- ^2 – Fastest lap.

==== Standings after the race ====
Drivers' Championship standings

	Pos	Driver	Points
	1	(United Kingdom) Oliver Rowland	184
	2	(Germany) Pascal Wehrlein	125
	3	(United Kingdom) Taylor Barnard	112
	4	(Portugal) António Félix da Costa	103
3	5	(New Zealand) Nick Cassidy	102

Teams' Championship standings

	Pos	Team	Points
	1	(Germany) Porsche	228
	2	(Japan) Nissan	205
	3	(United States) DS Penske	168
2	4	(United Kingdom) Jaguar	162
	5	(United Kingdom) McLaren	143

Manufacturers' Championship standings

Pos	Manufacturer	Points
1	(Germany) Porsche	342
2	(Japan) Nissan	335
3	(United Kingdom) Jaguar	279
4	(Netherlands) Stellantis	242
5	(India) Mahindra	169

- Notes: Only the top five positions are included for all three sets of standings.

== Notes ==
Previous race: 2025 Jakarta ePrix	FIA Formula E World Championship; 2024–25 season	Next race: 2025 London ePrix
Previous race: 2024 Berlin ePrix	Berlin ePrix	Next race: 2026 Berlin ePrix
