= Jake Dennis =

British racing driver (born 1995)

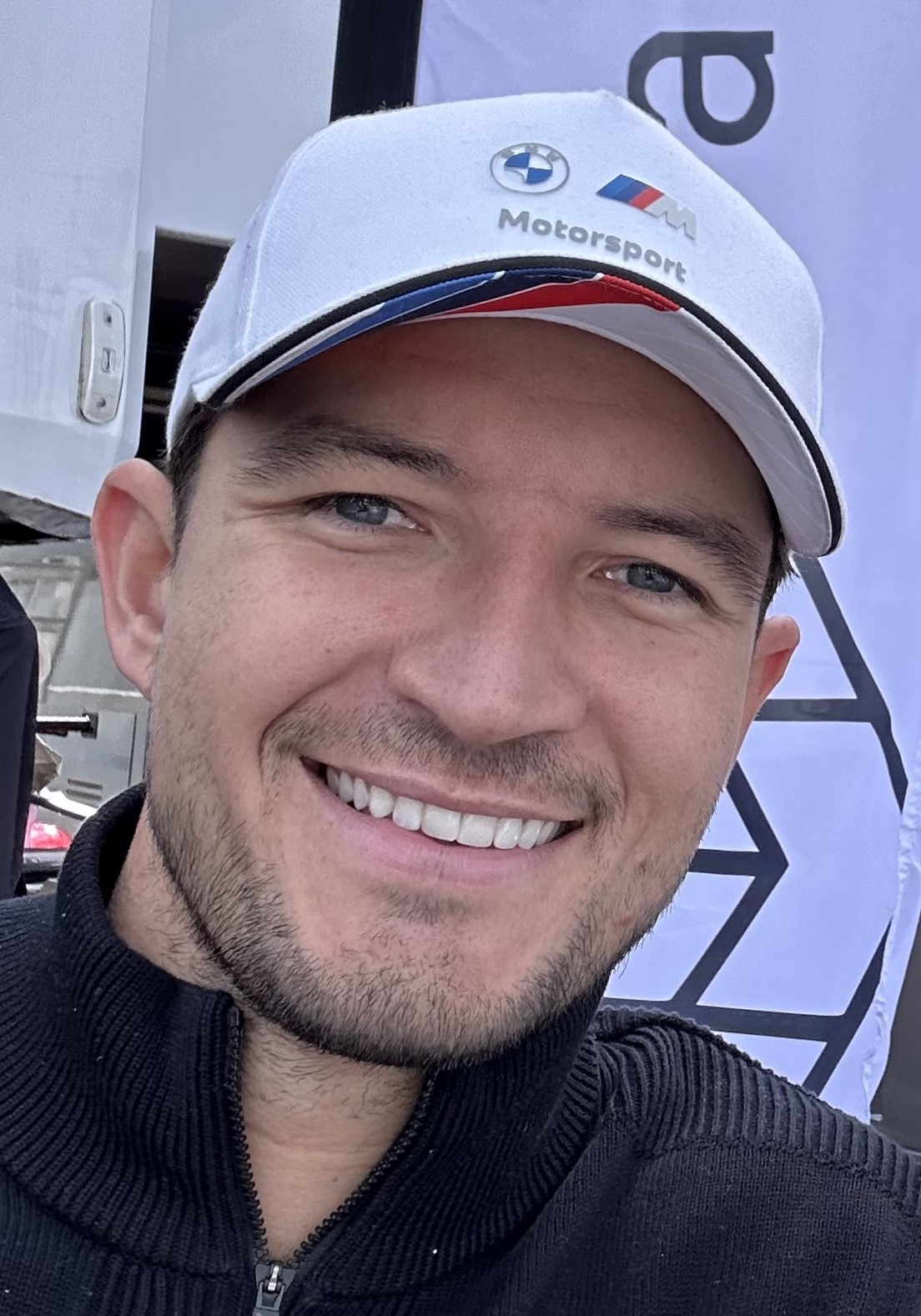
- Dennis at the Nürburgring GTWC Round in 2024
- Nationality: (United Kingdom) British
- Born: 16 June 1995 (age 31) Nuneaton, Warwickshire, England

Formula E career
- Debut season: 2020–21
- Current team: Andretti
- Categorisation: FIA Gold (until 2023); FIA Platinum (2024–)
- Car number: 27; 1 (2023–2024) (Note: Dennis competed using the number 1 during his World Championship defence in 2023–24.)
- Starts: 84
- Championships: 1 (2022–23)
- Wins: 8
- Podiums: 24
- Poles: 8
- Fastest laps: 12
- Finished last season: 2nd (164 pts)

Previous series
- 2017–2019, 2021 2020 2019 2018 2017–2018, 2020 2016 2015–2016 2014–2015, 2017 2013 2012 2011: GTWC Europe; ELMS; DTM; ADAC GT Masters; IGTC; GP3 Series; MRF Challenge; FIA F3 European; Formula Renault Eurocup; Formula Renault NEC; InterSteps

Championship titles
- 2012 2011: Formula Renault NEC; InterSteps

Awards
- 2012: Autosport BRDC Award
- Statistics up to date as of 28 July 2025.

Jake Dennis (born 16 June 1995) is a British racing driver who competes in Formula E for Andretti and serves as a factory driver for BMW. Dennis won the 2022–23 Formula E World Championship with Andretti.

Born and raised in Nuneaton, Warwickshire, Dennis began competitive kart racing aged eight. After a successful karting career—culminating in his victory at the junior World Championship in 2010—Dennis progressed to junior formulae. He came third in the 2015 FIA Formula 3 European Championship and fourth in the 2016 GP3 Series. Dennis has served as a test driver for Red Bull in Formula One since 2018.

After a period in sports car racing, Dennis joined BMW i Andretti Motorsport to make his Formula E debut in 2020–21 and finished third. After Andretti became a Porsche customer, Dennis won the world championship in 2022–23, and was runner-up to Pascal Wehrlein in 2025–26.

== Early career ==
=== Karting ===
Dennis began his racing career in karting at the age of eight with Andy Cox Racing. In 2005, he clinched South West Cadet championship title. Following year he finished third in the Shenington Club Championship. In 2008, he received Racing Steps Foundation backing and graduated to KF3 category. In his first year, he became British champion in KF3. By 2010, he claimed MSA Super 1 British Junior Championship and the CIK-FIA U18 World Championship.

=== InterSteps & Formula Renault ===
In 2011, Dennis made his début in single-seaters taking part in the new-for-2011 InterSteps championship for Fortec Motorsport, dominated in the championship and won the title with eight wins. Also he raced for Fortec in off-season Formula Renault UK Finals Series, finishing 19th in the standings with just three point-scoring finishes.

Dennis continued his collaboration with Fortec for Formula Renault 2.0 NEC (initially in British Formula Renault Championship but the championship was closed due to lack of entries) and Eurocup Formula Renault 2.0.

Dennis was nominated for the McLaren Autosport BRDC Award due to his performances in the Formula Renault 2.0 NEC series, Jake then went on to win the prestigious award, and became the youngest ever participant at only seventeen years of age.

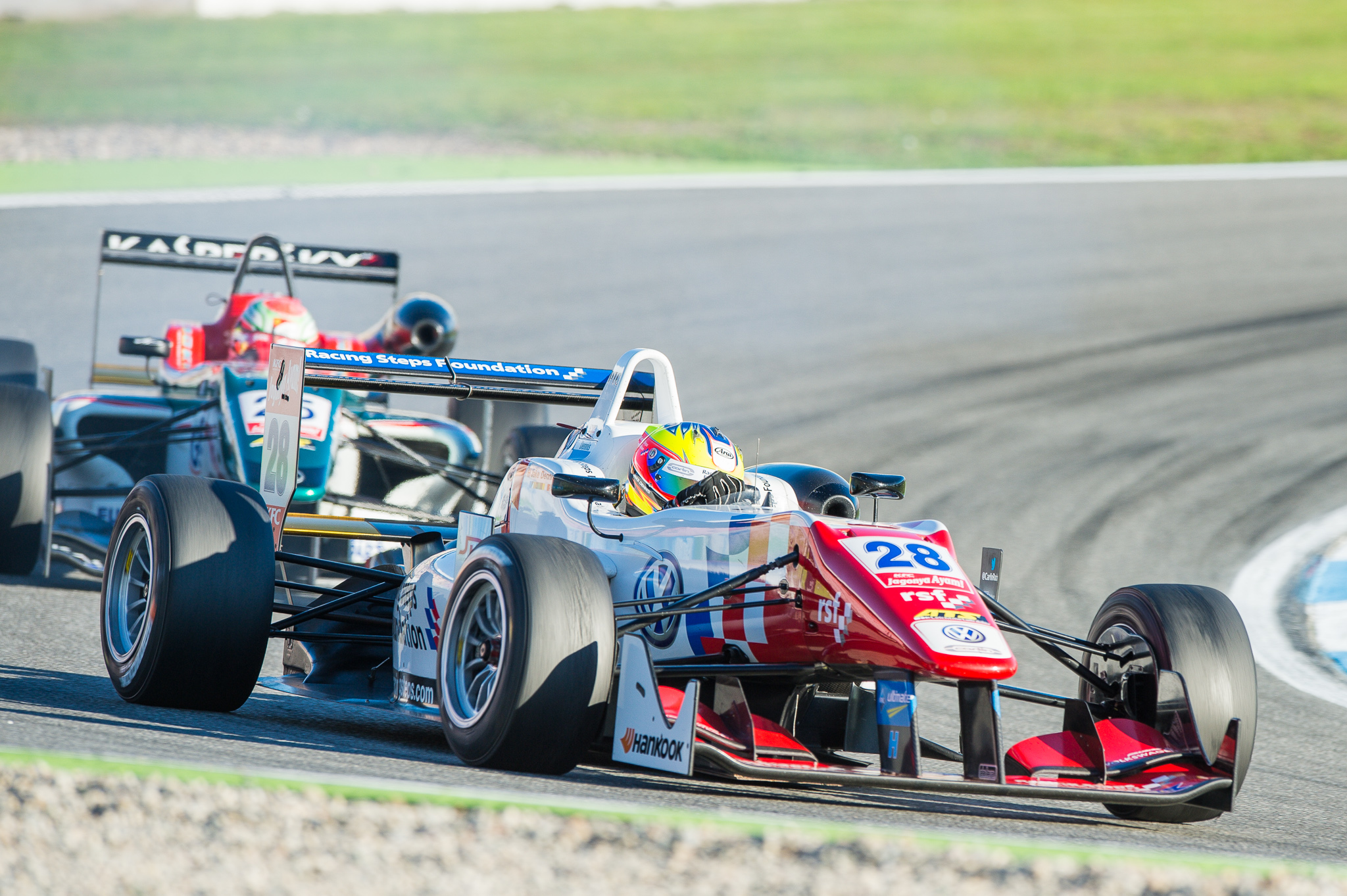
Jake Dennis in F3 – Hockenheimring 2014

In 2014, Dennis joined Carlin Motorsport to compete in the FIA European Formula 3 Championship, where he collected multiple podiums.

=== GP3 Series ===
In December 2015, it was announced that Dennis would compete in the 2016 GP3 Series with Arden International. He finished fourth in the drivers standings, having taken a pair of victories.

== Formula E ==
=== Andretti (2021–present) ===
==== 2020–21 season ====
Dennis debuted in the 2020–21 Formula E World Championship driving for the BMW i Andretti team alongside Maximilian Günther. With no points from the first four races, he took his first win during the second race of the 2021 Valencia ePrix, held at the Circuit Ricardo Tormo, and a second win in the first race round the Excel arena in London. After a red flag in the final race of the season in Berlin which saw two title contenders eliminated on the start line, the provisional standings meant Dennis and de Vries would be tied on 95 points if the race finished as it was, however in the restart Dennis, went for an overtake and crashed, meaning he would score no points, and not win the championship in his rookie season.

Dennis finished the season with four retirements and ended up third in the standings with 91 points, placing as the highest rookie.

==== 2021–22 season ====
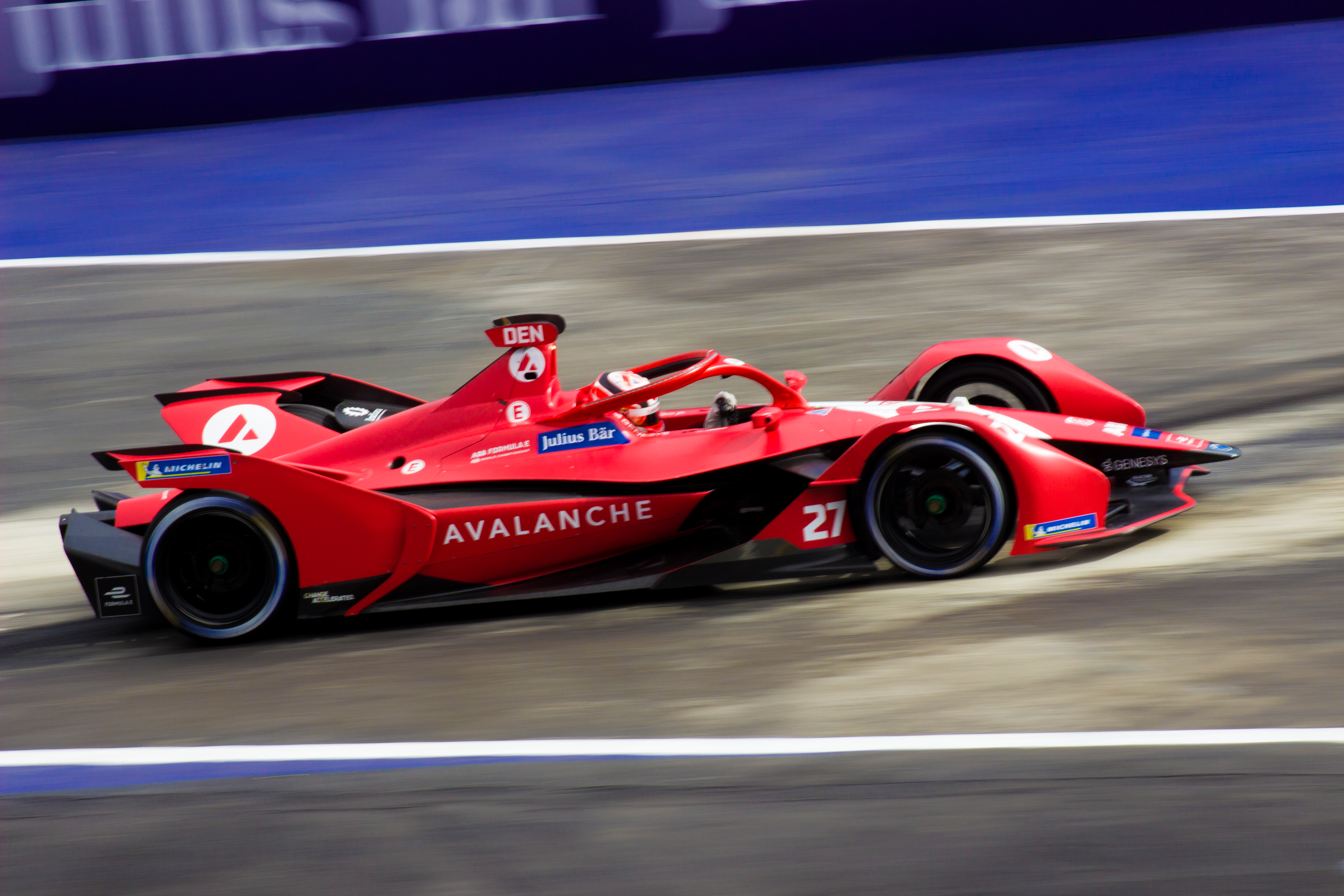
Dennis at the 2022 Mexico City ePrix with Andretti.

Dennis remained with Andretti despite BMW withdrawing from the team. He was partnered by Oliver Askew. Dennis took third in the opening race and fifth the next day giving him 25 points after two races. He then took one point from the next three races with a DNF in the second race in Rome, and then two points from the next three, with a total of 28 points from eight races. with a sixth, seventh, tenth and eighth following up. Dennis then had 47 points from twelve races heading to his home race in London.

Dennis topped the FP2 times in London and took the pace into Qualifying to secure pole and three points, Dennis won round 13 leading the race from championship leader Stoffel Vandoorne, and also took the fastest lap, giving him the maximum 29 points on Saturday. Dennis took pole again on Sunday but fought with di Grassi for the win and ended the race in second with the fastest lap. The strong weekend meant he climbed up the championship table gaining 51 points in two races. Dennis finished fourth with a fastest lap and third in Seoul to finish the season in sixth with 126 points, joint on points with di Grassi but behind due to countback, and di Grassi having one fourth place and Dennis having no fourth places.

==== 2022–23 season: World Champion ====
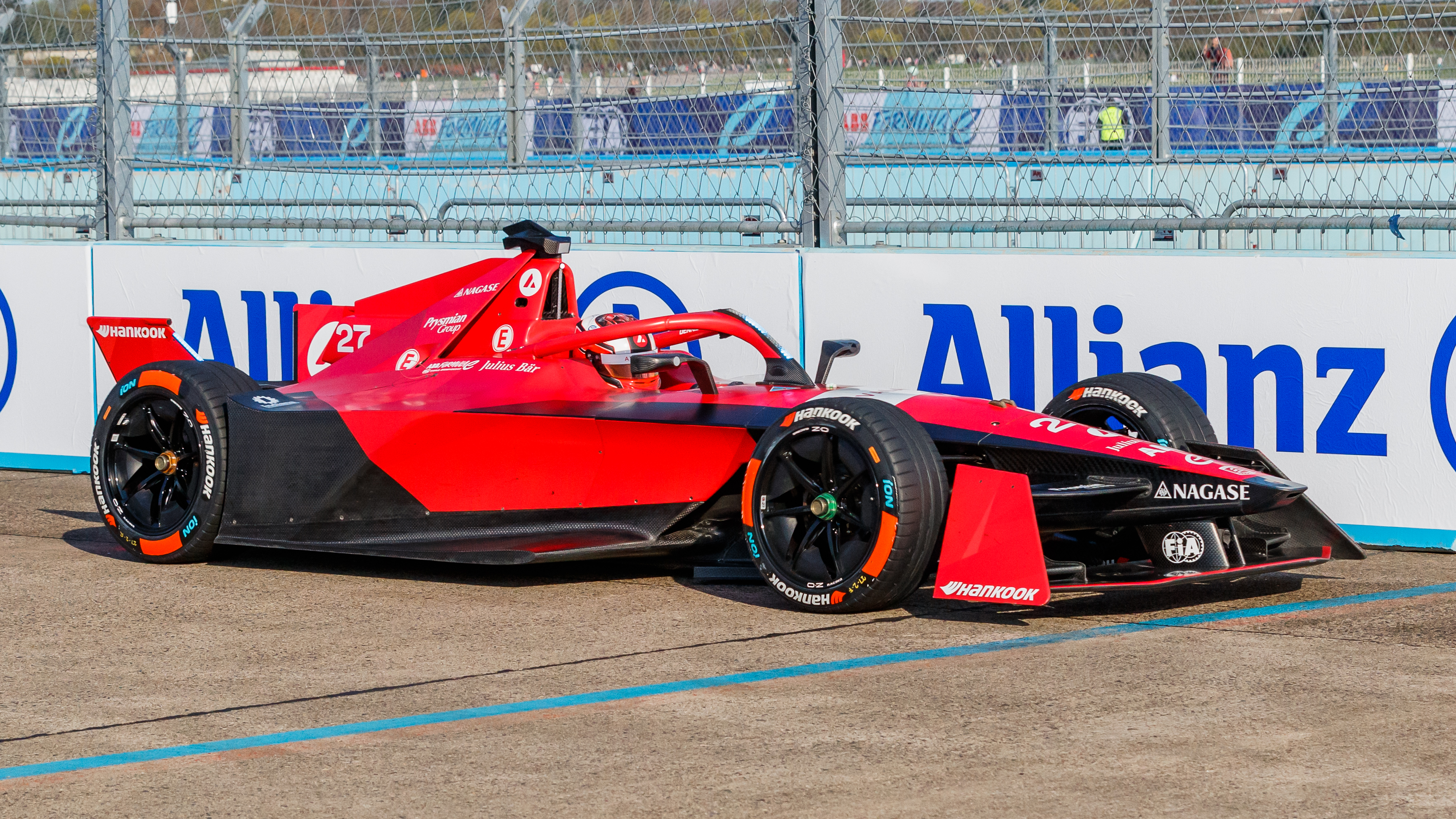
Dennis at the 2023 Berlin ePrix.

Dennis extended his contract to remain with Andretti for the 2022–23 season and beyond. At the season opener in Mexico City, Dennis managed to qualify second despite damaging his front wing during the quarter-final session, which he was unable to change due to Parc fermé regulations. He used his position to overtake poleman Lucas di Grassi in the opening stage of the race, after which the Briton created a gap, taking victory with a margin of eight second and becoming the first winner of the Gen3 era. His title charge continued in Diriyah, as, having started from the sixth row of the grid, Dennis charged through to finish second, narrowly missing out on victory to Pascal Wehrlein, an end result that repeated itself the following day. At the Hyderabad ePrix, Dennis would miss out on the points for the first time that year, being the victim of an error from René Rast, who collided with the back of the Andretti driver in the closing stages of the race. Misery would pile on in Cape Town, where, having been given a drive-through penalty for under-pressured tyres, the Briton ended up 13th.

In São Paulo, Dennis crashed into the back of championship rival Pascal Wehrlein after contact with Dan Ticktum, causing him to once again not score points and take only a fifth DNF in Formula E. The Brit once again failed to score at the following race in Berlin, being involved in a crash with António Félix da Costa due to a brake failure, though he was able to come back with a runner-up finish on Sunday. This began a podium streak which continued through the races in Monaco, Jakarta, and Portland, edging himself back into the title battle.

Following a lap count misjudgement on the part of Andretti that cost Dennis a potential victory in the first Rome race, a pole and subsequent victory in race two put the Brit into the lead of the championship, with his title rivals Cassidy and Evans having crashed out behind him. He eventually clinched the title at London with one race to go, having finished second on Saturday. By the end of the campaign, Dennis had scored eleven podiums, including two wins and two podiums, outscoring his teammate Lotterer by 206 points.

==== 2023–24 season ====
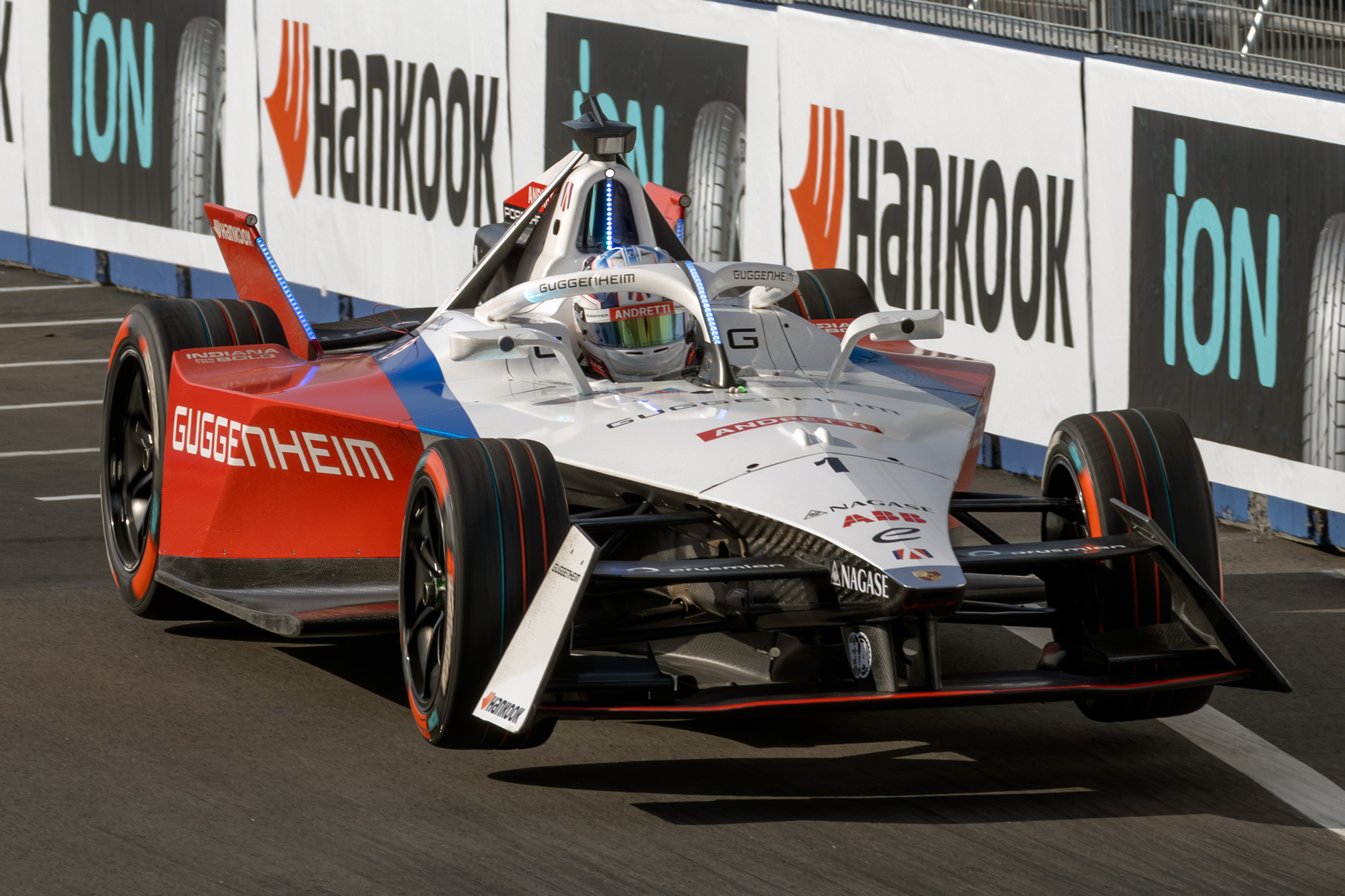
Dennis at the 2024 Tokyo ePrix

Pre-season, Dennis signed a multi-year extension to remain with Andretti through the 2024–25 Formula E season and beyond. He would be partnered at the team for the 2023–24 season with Norman Nato. During the first race in Diriyah, Dennis battled past Jean-Éric Vergne before extending his lead, scoring the fastest lap and taking the win in dominant fashion, ending up thirteen seconds ahead of Vergne.

==== 2024–25 season ====
Dennis was partnered alongside Nico Müller for the 2024–25 season.

==== 2025–26 season ====
For the 2025–26 season, Dennis was joined alongside Felipe Drugovich, who replaced the Porsche-bound Müller.

Dennis claimed his first win since Diriyah 2024 at Sao Paulo, followed by a win Sanya.

==== 2026–27 season ====
In February 2026, Dennis signed another multi-year deal to remain with the team into the Gen4 era.

== IndyCar ==
Following his season in Formula E in 2022 for the Avalanche Andretti team, Dennis tested one of the team's cars in October 2022 in a private IndyCar driver evaluation test at Sebring.

== Formula One ==
In 2018, Dennis was the simulator and development driver for Red Bull Racing. As a result of the team's association with Aston Martin, he tested for them at the Barcelona mid-season tests in May 2018, and then again at the Hungaroring in August. As of 2023, Dennis remains a development driver for Red Bull.

Dennis was chosen to participate in the Friday free practice session (FP1) at the 2023 Abu Dhabi Grand Prix for Red Bull. He finished the session in 16th.

== Racing record ==
=== Career summary ===
| Season | Series | Team | Races | Wins | Poles | F/Laps | Podiums | Points | Position |
|---|---|---|---|---|---|---|---|---|---|
| 2011 | InterSteps Championship | Fortec Motorsports | 20 | 8 | 7 | 5 | 16 | 539 | **1st** |
| 2011 | Formula Renault UK Finals Series | Fortec Motorsports | 6 | 0 | 0 | 0 | 0 | 38 | 19th |
| 2012 | Formula Renault 2.0 NEC | Fortec Motorsports | 20 | 3 | 2 | 3 | 11 | 376 | **1st** |
| 2012 | Eurocup Formula Renault 2.0 | Fortec Motorsports | 6 | 0 | 0 | 0 | 1 | 19 | 12th |
| 2013 | Eurocup Formula Renault 2.0 | Fortec Motorsports | 14 | 0 | 1 | 1 | 1 | 130 | 4th |
| 2013 | Formula Renault 2.0 NEC | Fortec Motorsports | 4 | 1 | 0 | 0 | 1 | 42 | 31st |
| 2013 | Pau Formula Renault 2.0 Trophy | Fortec Motorsports | 1 | 0 | 0 | 0 | 1 | N/A | **3rd** |
| 2014 | FIA Formula 3 European Championship | Carlin | 33 | 0 | 0 | 0 | 3 | 174 | 9th |
| 2015 | FIA Formula 3 European Championship | Prema Powerteam | 33 | 6 | 6 | 5 | 16 | 375 | **3rd** |
| 2015 | Macau Grand Prix | Prema Powerteam | 1 | 0 | 0 | 0 | 0 | N/A | 9th |
| 2015–16 | MRF Challenge Formula 2000 | MRF Racing | 4 | 0 | 0 | 1 | 2 | 53 | 9th |
| 2016 | GP3 Series | Arden International | 18 | 2 | 0 | 4 | 5 | 149 | 4th |
| 2016 | FIA World Endurance Championship – LMP2 | G-Drive Racing | 2 | 0 | 0 | 0 | 0 | 8 | 28th |
| 2016 | 24 Hours of Le Mans – LMP2 | G-Drive Racing | 1 | 0 | 0 | 0 | 0 | N/A | DNF |
| 2017 | Blancpain GT Series Sprint Cup | Team WRT | 10 | 0 | 0 | 0 | 2 | 27 | 9th |
| 2017 | Blancpain GT Series Endurance Cup | Team WRT | 5 | 0 | 1 | 0 | 1 | 28 | 12th |
| 2017 | Intercontinental GT Challenge | Team WRT | 2 | 0 | 0 | 0 | 0 | 8 | 12th |
| 2017 | FIA Formula 3 European Championship | Carlin | 9 | 0 | 0 | 0 | 1 | 41 | 17th |
| 2017 | China GT Championship | Kings Linky Racing | 2 | 1 | 1 | 1 | 2 | 40 | 12th |
| 2017 | Audi R8 LMS Cup | Castrol Racing Team | 2 | 1 | 0 | 0 | 1 | 0 | NC† |
| 2018 | Blancpain GT Series Endurance Cup | R-Motorsport | 5 | 1 | 2 | 0 | 1 | 29 | 13th |
| 2018 | 24H GT Series - A6 | R-Motorsport | | | | | | | |
| 2018 | ADAC GT Masters | Phoenix Racing | 2 | 0 | 0 | 0 | 0 | 22 | 24th |
| 2018 | ADAC GT Masters | Montaplast by Land-Motorsport | 6 | 0 | 0 | 0 | 1 | 22 | 24th |
| 2018 | Intercontinental GT Challenge | Belgian Audi Club Team WRT | 1 | 0 | 0 | 0 | 0 | 2 | 24th |
| 2018 | Formula One | Aston Martin Red Bull Racing | Development driver | | | | | | |
| 2019 | Deutsche Tourenwagen Masters | R-Motorsport I | 18 | 0 | 0 | 0 | 0 | 17 | 17th |
| 2019 | Blancpain GT Series Endurance Cup | R-Motorsport | 5 | 0 | 0 | 1 | 1 | 38 | 6th |
| 2019 | Formula One | Aston Martin Red Bull Racing | Development driver | | | | | | |
| 2020 | Intercontinental GT Challenge | R-Motorsport | 1 | 0 | 0 | 0 | 0 | 1 | 21st |
| 2020 | European Le Mans Series – LMP2 | Jota Sport | 1 | 0 | 0 | 0 | 0 | 0 | NC† |
| 2020 | Formula One | Aston Martin Red Bull Racing | Development driver | | | | | | |
| 2020–21 | Formula E | BMW i Andretti Motorsport | 15 | 2 | 1 | 0 | 2 | 91 | **3rd** |
| 2021 | GT World Challenge Europe Endurance Cup | Walkenhorst Motorsport | 2 | 0 | 0 | 0 | 0 | 0 | NC |
| 2021 | Nürburgring Endurance Series – M240i | Adrenalin Motorsport Team Alzner Automotive | 2 | 0 | 1 | 0 | 1 | 0 | NC† |
| 2021 | Formula One | Red Bull Racing Honda | Development driver | | | | | | |
| 2021–22 | Formula E | Avalanche Andretti Formula E | 16 | 1 | 2 | 2 | 4 | 126 | 6th |
| 2022 | Formula One | Oracle Red Bull Racing | Development driver | | | | | | |
| 2022–23 | Formula E | Avalanche Andretti Formula E | 16 | 2 | 2 | 5 | 11 | 229 | **1st** |
| 2023 | 24 Hours of Nürburgring – SP9 | Walkenhorst Motorsport | 1 | 0 | 0 | 0 | 0 | N/A | DNF |
| 2023 | Formula One | Oracle Red Bull Racing | Development driver | | | | | | |
| 2023–24 | Formula E | Andretti Formula E | 16 | 1 | 1 | 3 | 4 | 122 | 7th |
| 2024 | GT World Challenge Europe Endurance Cup | Century Motorsport | 4 | 0 | 0 | 0 | 0 | 6 | 26th |
| 2024 | GT World Challenge Europe Endurance Cup - Bronze Cup | Century Motorsport | 4 | 0 | 0 | 0 | 1 | 30 | 14th |
| 2024 | Italian GT Sprint Championship - GT3 | BMW Italia Ceccato Racing | 2 | 0 | 0 | 0 | 1 | 15 | NC† |
| 2024 | Formula One | Oracle Red Bull Racing | Development driver | | | | | | |
| 2024–25 | Formula E | Andretti Formula E | 16 | 0 | 1 | 0 | 2 | 93 | 7th |
| 2025 | GT World Challenge Europe Endurance Cup | Paradine Competition | 2 | 0 | 0 | 0 | 0 | 0 | NC |
| 2025 | GT World Challenge Europe Endurance Cup - Bronze Cup | Paradine Competition | 2 | 0 | 0 | 0 | 0 | 14 | 27th |
| 2025 | GT World Challenge Europe Sprint Cup | Paradine Competition | 4 | 0 | 0 | 0 | 0 | 0 | NC |
| 2025 | GT World Challenge Europe Sprint Cup - Bronze Cup | Paradine Competition | 4 | 0 | 1 | 0 | 0 | 5.5 | 19th |
| 2025 | Formula One | Oracle Red Bull Racing | Development driver | | | | | | |
| 2025–26 | Formula E | Andretti Formula E | 17 | 2 | 2 | 3 | 6 | 164 | **2nd** |
| 2026 | GT World Challenge Europe Endurance Cup | ROWE Racing | 5 | 0 | 0 | 0 | 0 | 26 | 8th |
| 2026 | Formula One | Oracle Red Bull Racing | Development driver | | | | | | |
| 2026–27 | Formula E | Andretti Formula E | 0 | 0 | 0 | 0 | 0 | 0 | TBD |

^{†} As Dennis was a guest driver, he was ineligible to score points.
^{*} Season still in progress.

=== Complete Formula Renault 2.0 Northern European Cup results ===
(key) (Races in bold indicate pole position) (Races in italics indicate fastest lap)

| Year | Entrant | 1 | 2 | 3 | 4 | 5 | 6 | 7 | 8 | 9 | 10 | 11 | 12 | 13 | 14 | 15 | 16 | 17 | 18 | 19 | 20 | Pos | Points |
|---|---|---|---|---|---|---|---|---|---|---|---|---|---|---|---|---|---|---|---|---|---|---|---|
| 2012 | Fortec Motorsports | HOC; 1; 3 | HOC; 2; 1 | HOC; 3; 2 | NÜR; 1; 12 | NÜR; 2; 7 | OSC; 1; 3 | **OSC**; **2**; 4 | OSC; 3; 1 | **ASS**; **1**; 1 | ASS; 2; 3 | RBR; 1; 4 | RBR; 2; 2 | MST; 1; 3 | **MST**; **2**; 7 | MST; 3; 4 | ZAN; 1; 3 | ZAN; 2; 3 | ZAN; 3; 5 | SPA; 1 Ret | SPA; 2; 7 | 1st | 376 |
| 2013 | Fortec Motorsports | HOC; 1; 24 | HOC; 2; 1 | HOC; 3; 9 | NÜR; 1 Ret | NÜR; 2 DNS | SIL; 1 | SIL; 2 | SPA; 1 | SPA; 2 | ASS; 1 | ASS; 2 | MST; 1 | MST; 2 | MST; 3 | ZAN; 1 | ZAN; 2 | ZAN; 3 | | | | 31st | 42 |

=== Complete Eurocup Formula Renault 2.0 results ===
(key) (Races in bold indicate pole position) (Races in italics indicate fastest lap)

| Year | Entrant | 1 | 2 | 3 | 4 | 5 | 6 | 7 | 8 | 9 | 10 | 11 | 12 | 13 | 14 | Pos | Points |
|---|---|---|---|---|---|---|---|---|---|---|---|---|---|---|---|---|---|
| 2012 | Fortec Motorsports | ALC; 1 | ALC; 2 | SPA; 1; 10 | SPA; 2; 2 | NÜR; 1; 14 | NÜR; 2; 24 | MSC; 1 | MSC; 2 | HUN; 1 | HUN; 2 | LEC; 1 | LEC; 2 | CAT; 1; 12 | CAT; 2; 4 | 12th | 31 |
| 2013 | Fortec Motorsports | ALC; 1; 5 | ALC; 2; 5 | **SPA**; **1**; 6 | SPA; 2; 5 | MSC; 1; 11 | MSC; 2; 5 | RBR; 1; 4 | RBR; 2; 4 | HUN; 1; 5 | HUN; 2; 9 | LEC; 1; 4 | LEC; 2; 2 | CAT; 1; 23† | CAT; 2; 4 | 4th | 130 |

=== Complete FIA Formula 3 European Championship results ===
(key) (Races in bold indicate pole position) (Races in italics indicate fastest lap)

| Year | Entrant | Engine | 1 | 2 | 3 | 4 | 5 | 6 | 7 | 8 | 9 | 10 | 11 | 12 | 13 | 14 | 15 | 16 | 17 | 18 | 19 | 20 | 21 | 22 | 23 | 24 | 25 | 26 | 27 | 28 | 29 | 30 | 31 | 32 | 33 | DC | Points |
|---|---|---|---|---|---|---|---|---|---|---|---|---|---|---|---|---|---|---|---|---|---|---|---|---|---|---|---|---|---|---|---|---|---|---|---|---|---|
| 2014 | Carlin | Volkswagen | SIL; 1; 17 | SIL; 2; 17 | SIL; 3 Ret | HOC; 1; 7 | HOC; 2; 10 | HOC; 3; 6 | PAU; 1; 4 | PAU; 2; 3 | PAU; 3; 4 | HUN; 1; 11 | HUN; 2; 17 | HUN; 3; 9 | SPA; 1; 3 | SPA; 2; 6 | SPA; 3; 7 | NOR; 1; 5 | NOR; 2; 4 | NOR; 3 Ret | MSC; 1; 15 | MSC; 2; 6 | MSC; 3; 4 | RBR; 1; 3 | RBR; 2; 18† | RBR; 3; 5 | NÜR; 1 Ret | NÜR; 2 Ret | NÜR; 3; 9 | IMO; 1; 7 | IMO; 2; 7 | IMO; 3; 7 | HOC; 1; 15 | HOC; 2; 12 | HOC; 3; 11 | 9th | 174 |
| 2015 | Prema Powerteam | Mercedes | SIL; 1; 3 | SIL; 2 Ret | SIL; 3; 3 | HOC; 1; 4 | HOC; 2; 15 | HOC; 3; 8 | **PAU**; **1**; 1 | **PAU**; **2**; 1 | **PAU**; **3**; 23 | MNZ; 1; 3 | MNZ; 2; 2 | MNZ; 3; 2 | SPA; 1; 5 | SPA; 2; 1 | **SPA**; **3**; 1 | NOR; 1 Ret | NOR; 2 Ret | NOR; 3; 11 | ZAN; 1 Ret | ZAN; 2; 3 | ZAN; 3; 4 | RBR; 1; 1 | RBR; 2; 8 | RBR; 3; 7 | **ALG**; **1**; 1 | ALG; 2; 2 | ALG; 3; 2 | NÜR; 1 Ret | NÜR; 2; 4 | NÜR; 3; 4 | HOC; 1; 2 | HOC; 2; 2 | **HOC**; **3**; 7 | 3rd | 375 |
| 2017 | Carlin | Volkswagen | SIL; 1; 2 | SIL; 2; 5 | SIL; 3; 5 | MNZ; 1 Ret | MNZ; 2 Ret | MNZ; 3 Ret | PAU; 1 Ret | PAU; 2; 10 | PAU; 3; 9 | HUN; 1 | HUN; 2 | HUN; 3 | NOR; 1 | NOR; 2 | NOR; 3 | SPA; 1 | SPA; 2 | SPA; 3 | ZAN; 1 | ZAN; 2 | ZAN; 3 | NÜR; 1 | NÜR; 2 | NÜR; 3 | RBR; 1 | RBR; 2 | RBR; 3 | HOC; 1 | HOC; 2 | HOC; 3 | | | | 17th | 41 |

^{†} Driver did not finish the race, but was classified as he completed over 90% of the race distance.

=== Complete GP3 Series results ===
(key) (Races in bold indicate pole position) (Races in italics indicate fastest lap)

| Year | Entrant | 1 | 2 | 3 | 4 | 5 | 6 | 7 | 8 | 9 | 10 | 11 | 12 | 13 | 14 | 15 | 16 | 17 | 18 | Pos | Pts |
|---|---|---|---|---|---|---|---|---|---|---|---|---|---|---|---|---|---|---|---|---|---|
| 2016 | Arden International | SPA; FEA; 7 | SPA; SPR; 4 | RBR; FEA; Ret | RBR; SPR; Ret | SIL; FEA; 12 | SIL; SPR; 9 | HUN; FEA; 3 | HUN; SPR; 7 | HOC; FEA; 12 | HOC; SPR; 6 | SPA; FEA; 2 | SPA; SPR; 5 | MNZ; FEA; 1 | MNZ; FEA; 4 | SEP; FEA; 6 | SEP; SPR; 1 | YMC; FEA; 2 | YMC; SPR; 4 | 4th | 149 |

=== Complete FIA World Endurance Championship results ===
(key) (Races in bold indicate pole position; races in italics indicate fastest lap)

| Year | Entrant | Class | Car | Engine | 1 | 2 | 3 | 4 | 5 | 6 | 7 | 8 | 9 | Rank | Points |
|---|---|---|---|---|---|---|---|---|---|---|---|---|---|---|---|
| 2016 | G-Drive Racing | LMP2 | Gibson 015S | Nissan VK45DE 4.5 L V8 | SIL | SPA; 6 | LMS; Ret | NÜR | MEX | COA | FUJ | SHA | BHR | 28th | 8 |

=== 24 Hours of Le Mans results ===
| Year | Team | Co-Drivers | Car | Class | Laps | Pos. | Class Pos. |
|---|---|---|---|---|---|---|---|
| 2016 | (Russia) G-Drive Racing | (United Kingdom) Simon Dolan (Netherlands) Giedo van der Garde | Gibson 015S-Nissan | LMP2 | 222 | DNF | DNF |

=== Complete GT World Challenge results ===
==== GT World Challenge Europe Endurance Cup ====
| Year | Team | Car | Class | 1 | 2 | 3 | 4 | 5 | 6 | 7 | Pos. | Points |
|---|---|---|---|---|---|---|---|---|---|---|---|---|
| 2017 | Team WRT | Audi R8 LMS GT3 | Pro | MNZ; 12 | SIL; 13 | LEC; 6 | SPA; 6H; 63 | SPA; 12H; 63 | SPA; 24H; Ret | CAT; 2 | 12th | 28 |
| 2018 | R-Motorsport | Aston Martin V12 Vantage GT3 | Pro | MNZ; Ret | **SIL**; 1 | **LEC**; 31 | SPA; 6H; 13 | SPA; 12H; 11 | SPA; 24H; 9 | CAT; 40 | 13th | 29 |
| 2019 | R-Motorsport | Aston Martin V12 Vantage GT3 | Pro | MNZ; 19 | SIL; 40 | LEC; 4 | SPA; 6H; 5 | SPA; 12H; 25 | SPA; 24H; 19 | CAT; 2 | 6th | 38 |
| 2021 | Walkenhorst Motorsport | BMW M6 GT3 | Pro | MNZ | LEC | SPA; 6H | SPA; 12H | SPA; 24H | NÜR; 12 | CAT; 21 | NC | 0 |
| 2024 | Century Motorsport | BMW M4 GT3 | Bronze | LEC; 49† | SPA; 6H | SPA; 12H | SPA; 24H | NÜR; 30 | MNZ; 7 | JED; Ret | 14th | 30 |
| 2025 | Paradine Competition | BMW M4 GT3 Evo | Bronze | LEC | MNZ | SPA; 6H; 46 | SPA; 12H; 56 | SPA; 24H; Ret | NÜR | CAT; 26 | 27th | 14 |
| 2026 | ROWE Racing | BMW M4 GT3 Evo | Pro | LEC; 6 | MNZ; 5 | SPA; 6H; 5 | SPA; 12H; 21 | SPA; 24H; 9 | NÜR; 17 | ALG; 21 | 8th | 26 |

==== GT World Challenge Europe Sprint Cup ====
| Year | Team | Car | Class | 1 | 2 | 3 | 4 | 5 | 6 | 7 | 8 | 9 | 10 | Pos. | Points |
|---|---|---|---|---|---|---|---|---|---|---|---|---|---|---|---|
| 2017 | Team WRT | Audi R8 LMS GT3 | Pro | MIS; QR; 14 | MIS; CR; 10 | BRH; QR; 13 | BRH; CR; 9 | ZOL; QR; 24 | ZOL; CR; 9 | HUN; QR; 3 | HUN; CR; 2 | NÜR; QR; 12 | NÜR; CR; 12 | 9th | 27 |
| 2025 | Paradine Competition | BMW M4 GT3 Evo | Bronze | BRH; 1 | BRH; 2 | ZAN; 1 | ZAN; 2 | MIS; 1 | MIS; 2 | MAG; 1; 31 | MAG; 2; 37 | VAL; 1 Ret | **VAL**; **2**; 36 | 19th | 5.5 |

=== Complete Deutsche Tourenwagen Masters results ===
| Year | Entrant | Chassis | 1 | 2 | 3 | 4 | 5 | 6 | 7 | 8 | 9 | 10 | 11 | 12 | 13 | 14 | 15 | 16 | 17 | 18 | Rank | Points |
|---|---|---|---|---|---|---|---|---|---|---|---|---|---|---|---|---|---|---|---|---|---|---|
| 2019 | R-Motorsport I | Aston Martin Vantage DTM | HOC; 1; 11 | HOC; 2; 11 | ZOL; 1 Ret | ZOL; 2; 6 | MIS; 1; 15 | MIS; 2; 13 | NOR; 1; 9 | NOR; 2; 12 | ASS; 1; 12 | ASS; 2 Ret | BRH; 1 Ret | BRH; 2; 9 | LAU; 1; 11 | LAU; 2 Ret | NÜR; 1 Ret | NÜR; 2; 14 | HOC; 1; 11 | HOC; 2; 8 | 17th | 17 |

=== Complete Formula E results ===
(key) (Races in bold indicate pole position; races in italics indicate fastest lap)

| Year | Team | Chassis | Powertrain | 1 | 2 | 3 | 4 | 5 | 6 | 7 | 8 | 9 | 10 | 11 | 12 | 13 | 14 | 15 | 16 | 17 | Pos | Points |
|---|---|---|---|---|---|---|---|---|---|---|---|---|---|---|---|---|---|---|---|---|---|---|
| 2020–21 | BMW i Andretti Motorsport | Spark SRT05e | BMW iFE.21 | DIR; 12 | DIR; Ret | RME; Ret | RME; 13 | VLC; 8 | **VLC**; 1 | MCO; 16 | PUE; 5 | PUE; 5 | NYC; Ret | NYC; 16 | LDN; 1 | LDN; 9 | BER; 5 | BER; Ret | | | 3rd | 91 |
| 2021–22 | Avalanche Andretti Formula E | Spark SRT05e | BMW iFE.21 | DRH; 3 | DRH; 5 | MEX; 10 | RME; 13 | RME; Ret | MCO; 9 | BER; 13 | BER; 13 | JAK; 6 | MRK; 7 | NYC; 10 | NYC; 8 | **LDN**; 1 | **LDN**; 2 | SEO; 4 | SEO; 3 | | 6th | 126 |
| 2022–23 | Avalanche Andretti Formula E | Formula E Gen3 | Porsche 99X Electric | MEX; 1 | DRH; 2 | DRH; 2 | HYD; 16 | CAP; 13 | SAP; Ret | BER; 18 | BER; 2 | MCO; 3 | JAK; 2 | JAK; 2 | **POR**; 2 | RME; 4 | **RME**; 1 | LDN; 2 | LDN; 3 | | 1st | 229 |
| 2023–24 | Andretti Formula E | Formula E Gen3 | Porsche 99X Electric | MEX; 9 | DRH; 1 | DRH; 12 | SAP; 5 | TKO; 3 | MIS; 2 | MIS; 2 | MCO; 18 | BER; Ret | **BER**; 5 | SHA; 5 | SHA; 11 | POR; 6 | POR; 10 | LDN; 16 | LDN; Ret | | 7th | 122 |
| 2024–25 | Andretti Formula E | Formula E Gen3 Evo | Porsche 99X Electric | SAO; Ret | MEX; 4 | JED; NC | JED; 4 | MIA; 9 | MCO; 3 | MCO; 9 | TKO; DSQ | TKO; 4 | SHA; 17 | SHA; 17 | **JKT**; 17 | BER; Ret | BER; 2 | LDN; 8 | LDN; 4 | | 7th | 93 |
| 2025–26 | Andretti Formula E | Formula E Gen3 Evo | Porsche 99X Electric | **SAO**; 1 | MEX; 5 | MIA; 10 | JED; 9 | JED; 19 | MAD; 8 | BER; 5 | BER; 6 | MCO; Ret | MCO; 12 | **SAN**; 1 | SHA; 3 | SHA; 13 | **TKO**; 2 | TKO; 3 | LDN; 2 | LDN; 18 | 2nd | 164 |

^{*} Season still in progress.

=== Complete Formula One participations ===
(key) (Races in bold indicate pole position) (Races in italics indicate fastest lap)

| Year | Entrant | Chassis | Engine | 1 | 2 | 3 | 4 | 5 | 6 | 7 | 8 | 9 | 10 | 11 | 12 | 13 | 14 | 15 | 16 | 17 | 18 | 19 | 20 | 21 | 22 | WDC | Points |
|---|---|---|---|---|---|---|---|---|---|---|---|---|---|---|---|---|---|---|---|---|---|---|---|---|---|---|---|
| 2023 | Oracle Red Bull Racing | Red Bull RB19 | Honda RBPTH001 1.6 V6 t | BHR | SAU | AUS | AZE | MIA | MON | ESP | CAN | AUT | GBR | HUN | BEL | NED | ITA | SIN | JPN | QAT | USA | MXC | SAP | LVG | ABU; TD | – | – |

== Notes ==
Sporting positions
| Preceded by Inaugural | Intersteps; Champion; 2011 | Succeeded by Matt Parry |
| Preceded by Carlos Sainz Jr. | Formula Renault 2.0 NEC; Champion; 2012 | Succeeded by Matt Parry |
| Preceded by Stoffel Vandoorne | Formula E Champion; 2022–23 | Succeeded by Pascal Wehrlein |
Awards
| Preceded by Oliver Rowland | McLaren Autosport BRDC Award; 2012 | Succeeded by Matt Parry |
