= 2022 Seoul ePrix =

Formula E ePrix

Race 15 of 16 of the 2021–22 Formula E season
← Previous race
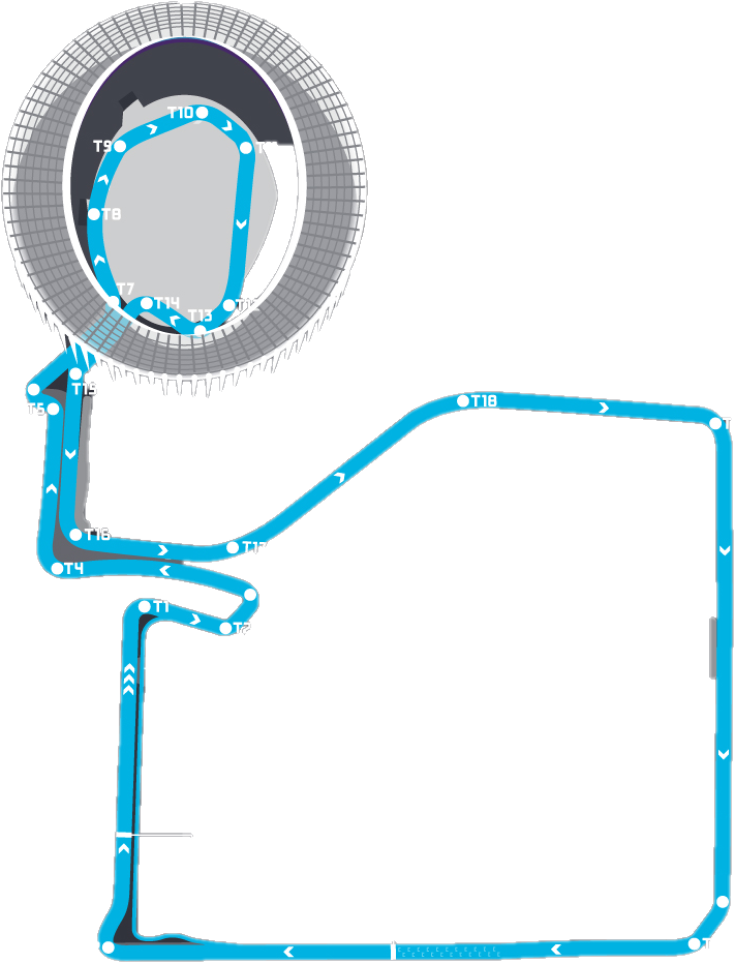

Race details
- Date: 13 August 2022
- Official name: 2022 Hana Bank Seoul E-Prix
- Location: Seoul Street Circuit, Seoul, South Korea
- Course: Street circuit
- Course length: 2.618 km (1.627 mi)
- Distance: 30 laps, 78.540 km (48.802 mi)

Pole position
Driver	(United Kingdom) Oliver Rowland	Mahindra
- Time: 1:35:406

Fastest lap
Driver	(United Kingdom) Jake Dennis	Andretti-BMW
- Time: 1:25:497 on lap 27

Podium
First	(New Zealand) Mitch Evans	Jaguar
Second	(United Kingdom) Oliver Rowland	Mahindra
Third	(Brazil) Lucas di Grassi	Venturi

2022 Seoul ePrix
Race 16 of 16 of the 2021–22 Formula E season
← Previous race
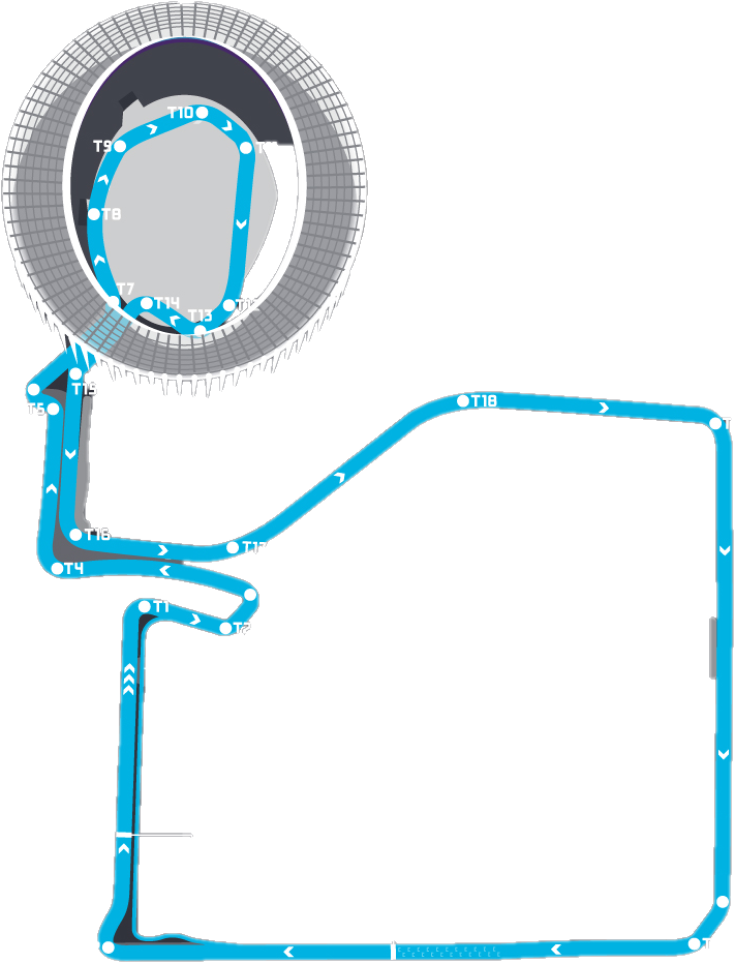

Race details
- Date: 14 August 2022
- Official name: 2022 Hana Bank Seoul E-Prix
- Location: Seoul Street Circuit, Seoul, South Korea
- Course: Street circuit
- Course length: 2.618 km (1.627 mi)
- Distance: 34 laps, 89.012 km (55.309 mi)

Pole position
Driver	(Portugal) António Félix da Costa	DS Techeetah
- Time: 1:21:078

Fastest lap
Driver	(New Zealand) Nick Cassidy	Envision
- Time: 1:22:401 on lap 24

Podium
First	(Switzerland) Edoardo Mortara	Venturi
Second	(Belgium) Stoffel Vandoorne	Mercedes
Third	(United Kingdom) Jake Dennis	Andretti-BMW

The 2022 Seoul ePrix, formally known as the 2022 Hana Bank Seoul E-Prix, was a pair of Formula E electric car races staged at the Seoul Street Circuit in the Jamsil Sports Complex, Seoul, South Korea, on 13 and 14 August 2022. They served as the fifteenth and sixteenth rounds of the 2021-22 ABB FIA Formula E World Championship, The race was the first and only running of the Seoul ePrix after it had been postponed since 2020 due to the COVID-19 pandemic. It was raced as the first ePrix in South Korea and fifth Asian country to host an ePrix, following China (including Hong Kong), Malaysia, Saudi Arabia, and Indonesia. The second race was the 100th race in Formula E history.

It was the first time in nine years that South Korea has hosted large motorsports events since the last Formula One Korean Grand Prix held in 2013.

== History ==
In 2004, before Formula E was founded, the American based Champ Car (Formerly CART) World Series was planning a race in Asia, with South Korea being a potential location for a date on the 2004 calendar, being a street race in Hangang Park in the capital of Seoul. The race was supposed to be held on October 16, the week before the Lexmark Indy 300 in Surfers Paradise, Australia. The race was cancelled due to track construction being behind schedule. The race never returned on the provisional schedule in 2005 and instead planned to race in nearby Ansan. Unlike the proposed one at Seoul, the race was also scheduled to be on October 16 ahead of the race at Surfers Paradise. The race was cancelled in 2005 and 2006, and the site became part of a set for the South Korean version of Top Gear. The race did not come back on the provisional 2007 schedule and in February 2008, Champ Car and its competitor IndyCar merged. And in the mid-2010s, the track was demolished for apartments. A Champ Car race in South Korea never happened.

South Korea's previous attempts at hosting motorsport events include the Korean Grand Prix held at the Korea International Circuit in Yeongam, which ran from 2010 to 2013. Low attendance figures, five hours of traveling time from Seoul and unfulfilled resort facilities around the track were the main reasons for the event's failure.

On 30 November 2018, Formula E CEO, Alejandro Agag signed an agreement with Moon Jae-sik, chairman of JSM Holdings. South Korea was given the right to hold the ABB Formula E Championship from 2020 to 2025. The aim was to expand the Asian market and provide a platform for cooperation between Formula E and South Korean automobile industrial technology and eco-friendly innovations.

The Formula E race would be served as an attraction for motor sport fans from nearby countries such as China and Japan.

Three other candidates in the Asia-Pacific region considered for hosting included Australia, Russia, and New Zealand.

The inaugural Seoul ePrix was cancelled in response to the COVID-19 pandemic, then it was due to take place on 23 May 2021 as the 9th round of the 2021 Formula E season. But due to the ongoing situation of the COVID-19 pandemic, the race's first running would be on the 2022 Formula E season. On 19 June 2021, Seoul city government announced that the race's first running would be set to form part of the Seoul Fest celebrations on the days of 13–14 August 2022.

The Seoul ePrix was set to return for the 2022-23 Formula E season on 20 and 21 May 2023, but renovation works to the Jamsil Stadium meant that the event would not be able to take place, and it was replaced by the Cape Town ePrix. The track was later left off the calendar for the 2023–24 Formula E season.

== Circuit ==
On 23 July 2018, a feasibility study on candidate areas including Gwanghwamun in Seoul was completed. As a result of the survey, the popular tourist area around Gwanghwamun Square and City Hall Square was selected as a candidate region.

Then, the proposed 2.800 km (1.740 mi) layout was revealed in July 2019, which was located around the Seoul Olympic Stadium and some part of the track was inside of this stadium.

Before the 2022 race, the circuit layout was still located within the Jamsil Sports Complex, however the layout was revised and shortened from 2.800 to 2.618 km (1.740 to 1.627 mi).

== Background ==
After fourteen races in nine cities, the 2021-22 Formula E World Championship arrived in Seoul, South Korea, for its season finale. The Jamsil Sports Complex would play host to the Seoul Street Circuit, which was to stage the 99th and 100th FE races, a significant milestone in FE's history. The races were also the last of the Generation 2 era for FE, with the Spark SRT05e to be retired at the end of the race weekend having served as the series' base chassis since the 2018-19 season.

=== Driver changes ===
Sam Bird missed the season finale, after he was found to have broken his hand at the 2022 London ePrix, an injury he would carry throughout that race. Bird's streak of winning at least one race in every season was ended. Jaguar's reserve driver Norman Nato would sub for the British driver. It was Nato's first appearance since the 2021 Berlin ePrix.

Sacha Fenestraz, having been a reserve driver for Jaguar in 2021, replaced Antonio Giovinazzi and made his Formula E debut for the second round after Giovinazzi suffered a hand injury during the first event.

=== Championship standing before the race ===
58 points were available for the Drivers' Championship in the final two rounds. Stoffel Vandoorne led the championship with 36 points over Mitch Evans, 41 points over Edoardo Mortara and 57 points over Jean-Éric Vergne.

In the Teams' Championship, 94 points were still available. Mercedes held a 36-point lead over ROKiT Venturi, a 47-point lead over DS Techeetah and a 91-point lead over Jaguar Racing.

== Race 1 ==
=== Qualifying ===
Oliver Rowland took the pole position in the wet condition, defeating Lucas di Grassi in the final by 0.623s.

Group draw
Group A	(Belgium) VAN	(Switzerland) MOR	(Portugal) DAC	(Netherlands) FRI	(United Kingdom) DEN	(Germany) LOT	(Switzerland) BUE	(United States) ASK	(United Kingdom) TUR	(Brazil) SET	(Italy) GIO
Group B	(New Zealand) EVA	(France) JEV	(Brazil) DIG	(Netherlands) DEV	(Germany) WEH	(New Zealand) CAS	(United Kingdom) SIM	(United Kingdom) ROW	(Germany) GUE	(United Kingdom) TIC	(France) NAT

Qualifying duels

Quarter-finals
B4	(New Zealand) Mitch Evans
A1	(Switzerland) Edoardo Mortara
B3	(Brazil) Lucas di Grassi
A2	(United Kingdom) Jake Dennis
A3	(Brazil) Sérgio Sette Câmara
B2	(United Kingdom) Oliver Rowland
A4	(Belgium) Stoffel Vandoorne
B1	(Germany) Pascal Wehrlein

Semi-finals
(New Zealand) Mitch Evans
(Brazil) Lucas di Grassi
(United Kingdom) Oliver Rowland
(Germany) Pascal Wehrlein

Final
(Brazil) Lucas di Grassi
(United Kingdom) Oliver Rowland

Overall Classification

Pos.	No.	Driver	Team	A	B	QF	SF	F	Grid
1	30	(United Kingdom) Oliver Rowland	Mahindra	—N/a	1:30:345	1:32:590	1:34:880	1:35:406	1
2	11	(Brazil) Lucas di Grassi	Venturi-Mercedes	—N/a	1:30:726	1:31:735	1:35:692	1:36:029	2
3	9	(New Zealand) Mitch Evans	Jaguar	—N/a	1:30:755	1:31:293	1:35:884	—N/a	3
4	94	(Germany) Pascal Wehrlein	Porsche	—N/a	1:30:321	1:35:117	1:36:517	—N/a	4
5	27	(United Kingdom) Jake Dennis	Andretti-BMW	1:22:441	—N/a	1:32:424	—N/a	—N/a	5
6	48	(Switzerland) Edoardo Mortara	Venturi-Mercedes	1:22:397	—N/a	1:32:442	—N/a	—N/a	6
7	5	(Belgium) Stoffel Vandoorne	Mercedes	1:22:542	—N/a	1:35:401	—N/a	—N/a	7
8	7	(Brazil) Sérgio Sette Câmara	Dragon-Penske	1:22:477	—N/a	—N/a	—N/a	—N/a	8
9	25	(France) Jean-Éric Vergne	Techeetah-DS	—N/a	1:30.811	—N/a	—N/a	—N/a	9
10	23	(Switzerland) Sébastien Buemi	e.dams-Nissan	1:22:732	—N/a	—N/a	—N/a	—N/a	10
11	10	(France) Norman Nato	Jaguar	—N/a	1:30:943	—N/a	—N/a	—N/a	11
12	13	(Portugal) António Félix da Costa	Techeetah-DS	1:22:793	—N/a	—N/a	—N/a	—N/a	12
13	33	(United Kingdom) Dan Ticktum	NIO	—N/a	1:31:577	—N/a	—N/a	—N/a	13
14	99	(Italy) Antonio Giovinazzi	Dragon-Penske	1:22:837	—N/a	—N/a	—N/a	—N/a	14
15	17	(Netherlands) Nyck de Vries	Mercedes	—N/a	1:31:704	—N/a	—N/a	—N/a	15
16	4	(Netherlands) Robin Frijns	Envision-Audi	1:23:057	—N/a	—N/a	—N/a	—N/a	16
17	22	(Germany) Maximilian Günther	e.dams-Nissan	—N/a	1:31:840	—N/a	—N/a	—N/a	17
18	3	(United Kingdom) Oliver Turvey	NIO	1:23:214	—N/a	—N/a	—N/a	—N/a	18
19	37	(New Zealand) Nick Cassidy	Envision-Audi	—N/a	1:32:387	—N/a	—N/a	—N/a	19
20	36	(Germany) André Lotterer	Porsche	1:23:331	—N/a	—N/a	—N/a	—N/a	20
21	29	(United Kingdom) Alexander Sims	Mahindra	—N/a	1:33:592	—N/a	—N/a	—N/a	21
22	28	(United States) Oliver Askew	Andretti-BMW	1:50:546	—N/a	—N/a	—N/a	—N/a	22

=== Race ===
==== Report ====
The circuit was very damp at the start of the race. Di Grassi and Evans passed pole sitter Rowland in the first corner. Evans then overtook di Grassi to claim the lead, before di Grassi dropped behind Rowland.

Eight cars ended up in the barriers at turns 20 and 21 at the end of the opening lap which caused a red flag, due to the damp conditions and the changing surfaces. Norman Nato and Nick Cassidy both rejoined the race and had the race cars repaired. The accident had been cleared after 45 minutes.

Edoardo Mortara weaved around in the braking zone in front of Jean-Éric Vergne, causing a collision between the two. The incident allowed Vergne and Vandoorne to pass Mortara before Mortara had a 5-second penalty added for the overly aggressive defending. Mortara would make more aggressive defensive manoeuvres trying to hold off Wehrlein, before his race came to an end with a right-rear puncture.

With five minutes to go, Alexander Sims put himself into the barriers in the Stadium and was out of the race. The safety car made its second appearance of the day to lead the field past the chequered flag. Evans claimed the victory to keep his title hopes alive. Rowland and di Grassi finished on the podium. Dennis claimed the bonus point for fastest lap in fourth. Vandoorne finished in fifth to maintain a 21-point lead over Evans in the Championship heading into the final race. Vergne, Wehrlein, Robin Frijns, António Félix da Costa and Cassidy secured the remaining points. Evans would become the only championship contender to Vandoorne after the race.

==== Result ====
Pos.	No.	Driver	Team	Laps	Time/Retired	Grid	Points
1	20	(New Zealand) Mitch Evans	Jaguar	30	1:29:55.478	3	25
2	30	(United Kingdom) Oliver Rowland	Mahindra	30	+0.820	1	18+3^{1}
3	11	(Brazil) Lucas di Grassi	Venturi-Mercedes	30	+1.393	2	15
4	27	(United Kingdom) Jake Dennis	Andretti-BMW	30	+1.902	5	12+1^{2}
5	5	(Belgium) Stoffel Vandoorne	Mercedes	30	+2.470	7	10
6	25	(France) Jean-Éric Vergne	DS Techeetah	30	+3.957	9	8
7	94	(Germany) Pascal Wehrlein	Porsche	30	+4.149	4	6
8	4	(Netherlands) Robin Frijns	Envision-Audi	30	+4.508	16	4
9	13	(Portugal) António Félix da Costa	DS Techeetah	30	+4.970	12	2
10	37	(New Zealand) Nick Cassidy	Envision-Audi	30	+5.325	19	1
11	22	(Germany) Maximilian Günther	e.dams-Nissan	30	+5.610	17	
12	7	(Brazil) Sérgio Sette Câmara	Dragon-Penske	30	+6.121	8	
13	10	(France) Norman Nato	Jaguar	30	+57.545 (Note: Nato served a five second time penalty for falling more than ten car lengths behind the car ahead during a Safety Car period. The penalty made no difference as he finished the race last.)	11	
Ret	29	(United Kingdom) Alexander Sims	Mahindra	26	Accident	21	
Ret	99	(Italy) Antonio Giovinazzi	Dragon-Penske	24	Retired	14	
Ret	48	(Switzerland) Edoardo Mortara	Venturi-Mercedes	20	Puncture	6	
Ret	33	(United Kingdom) Dan Ticktum	NIO	0	Accident	13	
Ret	3	(United Kingdom) Oliver Turvey	NIO	0	Accident	18	
Ret	28	(United States) Oliver Askew	Andretti-BMW	0	Accident	22	
Ret	17	(Netherlands) Nyck de Vries	Mercedes	0	Accident	15	
Ret	23	(Switzerland) Sébastien Buemi	e.dams-Nissan	0	Accident	10	
Ret	36	(Germany) André Lotterer	Porsche	0	Accident	20	

Notes:

- ^1 – Pole position.
- ^2 – Fastest lap.

==== Standings after the race ====
Stoffel Vandoorne had failed to secure the Championship in the first Seoul E-Prix. Mitch Evans had to win the final race with Vandoorne retiring to take the title. A sixth-place finish would be enough for Vandoorne to claim the title, regardless of where Evans would finish. Evans could also win the Championship with Vandoorne failing to score and him finishing in second with pole position.

Mercedes' still held a 31-point lead over ROKiT Venturi Racing, their closest challenger and the only other team that could take the title mathematically. Venturi would require a double podium to win the Team' Championship. DS Techeetah could theoretically tie with Mercedes on 301 points with a maximum score on the final day, but Mercedes would still take the title, as they would hold three victories to DS Techeetah's two victories in theory.

Drivers' Championship standings

	Pos	Driver	Points
	1	(Belgium) Stoffel Vandoorne	195
	2	(New Zealand) Mitch Evans	174
	3	(Switzerland) Edoardo Mortara	144
	4	(France) Jean-Éric Vergne	136
1	5	(Brazil) Lucas di Grassi	126

Teams' Championship standings

Pos	Team	Points
1	(Germany) Mercedes	301
2	(Monaco) ROKiT Venturi-Mercedes	270
3	(France) DS Techeetah	254
4	(United Kingdom) Jaguar	225
5	(United Kingdom) Envision-Audi	177

- Notes: Only the top five positions are included for both sets of standings.

== Race 2 ==
=== Qualifying ===
Group draw
Group A	(Belgium) VAN	(Switzerland) MOR	(Brazil) DIG	(Netherlands) FRI	(Netherlands) DEV	(New Zealand) CAS	(United Kingdom) ROW	(United Kingdom) SIM	(United Kingdom) TUR	(Brazil) SET	(France) NAT
Group B	(New Zealand) EVA	(France) JEV	(Portugal) DAC	(United Kingdom) DEN	(Germany) WEH	(Germany) LOT	(Switzerland) BUE	(United States) ASK	(Germany) GUE	(United Kingdom) TIC	(France) FEN

Qualifying duels

Quarter-finals
B4	(United Kingdom) Dan Ticktum
A1	(Switzerland) Edoardo Mortara
B3	(France) Jean-Éric Vergne
A2	(Belgium) Stoffel Vandoorne
A3	(Netherlands) Robin Frijns
B2	(Portugal) António Félix da Costa
A4	(Brazil) Lucas di Grassi
B1	(United Kingdom) Jake Dennis

Semi-finals
(Switzerland) Edoardo Mortara
(Belgium) Stoffel Vandoorne
(Portugal) António Félix da Costa
(United Kingdom) Jake Dennis

Final
(Switzerland) Edoardo Mortara
(Portugal) António Félix da Costa

Overall Classification

Pos.	No.	Driver	Team	A	B	QF	SF	F	Grid
1	13	(Portugal) António Félix da Costa	Techeetah-DS	—N/a	1:21:718	1:20:920	1:20:925	1:21:078	1
2	48	(Switzerland) Edoardo Mortara	Venturi-Mercedes	1:21:770	—N/a	1:21:229	1:20:913	1:21:342	2
3	27	(United Kingdom) Jake Dennis	Andretti-BMW	—N/a	1:21:673	1:21:035	1:21:050	—N/a	3
4	5	(Belgium) Stoffel Vandoorne	Mercedes	1:21:811	—N/a	1:21:260	1:21:069	—N/a	4
5	4	(Netherlands) Robin Frijns	Envision-Audi	1:21:834	—N/a	1:21:194	—N/a	—N/a	5
6	11	(Brazil) Lucas di Grassi	Venturi-Mercedes	1:21:895	—N/a	1:21:209	—N/a	—N/a	6
7	33	(United Kingdom) Dan Ticktum	NIO	—N/a	1:21:801	1:21:611	—N/a	—N/a	7
8	25	(France) Jean-Éric Vergne	Techeetah-DS	—N/a	1:21:767	1:22:642	—N/a	—N/a	8
9	22	(Germany) Maximilian Günther	e.dams-Nissan	—N/a	1:21:825	—N/a	—N/a	—N/a	9
10	7	(Brazil) Sérgio Sette Câmara	Dragon-Penske	1:21:989	—N/a	—N/a	—N/a	—N/a	10
11	28	(United States) Oliver Askew	Andretti-BMW	—N/a	1:21:877	—N/a	—N/a	—N/a	11
12	17	(Netherlands) Nyck de Vries	Mercedes	1:22:148	—N/a	—N/a	—N/a	—N/a	12
13	9	(New Zealand) Mitch Evans	Jaguar	—N/a	1:22:094	—N/a	—N/a	—N/a	13
14	37	(New Zealand) Nick Cassidy	Envision-Audi	1:22:232	—N/a	—N/a	—N/a	—N/a	14
15	94	(Germany) Pascal Wehrlein	Porsche	—N/a	1:22:114	—N/a	—N/a	—N/a	15
16	10	(France) Norman Nato	Jaguar	1:22:286	—N/a	—N/a	—N/a	—N/a	16
17	36	(Germany) André Lotterer	Porsche	—N/a	1:22:254	—N/a	—N/a	—N/a	17
18	30	(United Kingdom) Oliver Rowland	Mahindra	1:22:323	—N/a	—N/a	—N/a	—N/a	18
19	23	(Switzerland) Sébastien Buemi	e.dams-Nissan	—N/a	1:22:299	—N/a	—N/a	—N/a	19
20	3	(United Kingdom) Oliver Turvey	NIO	1:22:363	—N/a	—N/a	—N/a	—N/a	20
21	99	(France) Sacha Fenestraz	Dragon-Penske	—N/a	1:23:432	—N/a	—N/a	—N/a	21
22	29	(United Kingdom) Alexander Sims	Mahindra	1:23:079	—N/a	—N/a	—N/a	—N/a	22

=== Race ===
==== Result ====
Pos.	No.	Driver	Team	Laps	Time/Retired	Grid	Points
1	48	(Switzerland) Edoardo Mortara	Venturi-Mercedes	34	53:31.680	2	25
2	5	(Belgium) Stoffel Vandoorne	Mercedes	34	+3.756	4	18
3	27	(United Kingdom) Jake Dennis	Andretti-BMW	34	+6.649 (Note: Dennis was given a five-second time penalty for causing a collision with Félix da Costa.)	3	15
4	4	(Netherlands) Robin Frijns	Envision-Audi	34	+7.021	5	12
5	28	(United States) Oliver Askew	Andretti-BMW	34	+7.850	11	10
6	25	(France) Jean-Éric Vergne	DS Techeetah	34	+9.471	8	8
7	20	(New Zealand) Mitch Evans	Jaguar	34	+10.243	13	6
8	37	(New Zealand) Nick Cassidy	Envision-Audi	34	+14.208	14	4+1^{2}
9	23	(Switzerland) Sébastien Buemi	e.dams-Nissan	34	+16.629	19	2
10	13	(Portugal) António Félix da Costa	DS Techeetah	34	+22.226	1	1+3^{1}
11	11	(Brazil) Lucas di Grassi	Venturi-Mercedes	34	+24.546	6	
12	29	(United Kingdom) Alexander Sims	Mahindra	34	+26.513	22	
13	7	(Brazil) Sérgio Sette Câmara	Dragon-Penske	34	+27.813	10	
14	10	(France) Norman Nato	Jaguar	34	+31.526	16	
15	3	(United Kingdom) Oliver Turvey	NIO	34	+31.565	20	
16	99	(France) Sacha Fenestraz	Dragon-Penske	34	+36.270	21	
Ret	22	(Germany) Maximilian Günther	e.dams-Nissan	16	Accident	9	
Ret	17	(Netherlands) Nyck de Vries	Mercedes	7	Accident Damage	12	
Ret	94	(Germany) Pascal Wehrlein	Porsche	6		15	
Ret	33	(United Kingdom) Dan Ticktum	NIO	2	Collision damage	7	
Ret	30	(United Kingdom) Oliver Rowland	Mahindra	0	Collision	18	
Ret	36	(Germany) André Lotterer	Porsche	0	Collision	17	

Notes:

- ^1 – Pole position.
- ^2 – Fastest lap.

==== Standings after the race ====
Stoffel Vandoorne and Mercedes took the double Formula E World Championships after the race, before Mercedes withdrew from the series.

Drivers' Championship standings

Pos	Driver	Points
1	(Belgium) Stoffel Vandoorne	213
2	(New Zealand) Mitch Evans	180
3	(Switzerland) Edoardo Mortara	169
4	(France) Jean-Éric Vergne	144
5	(Brazil) Lucas di Grassi	126

Teams' Championship standings

Pos	Team	Points
1	(Germany) Mercedes	319
2	(Monaco) ROKiT Venturi-Mercedes	295
3	(France) DS Techeetah	266
4	(United Kingdom) Jaguar	231
5	(United Kingdom) Envision-Audi	194

- Notes: Only the top five positions are included for both sets of standings.

== Milestones ==
- The only Seoul ePrix staged.
- Sixth victory for Mitch Evans.
- The eighth win for Jaguar Racing as an entrant and Jaguar as a powertrain supplier.
- Lucas di Grassi became the first driver in FE history to pass 1,000 career points.
- Fifth fastest lap recorded by Andretti as an entrant.
- Sixth and final victory for Edoardo Mortara as of July 2024.
- 100th Formula E ePrix.

== Notes ==
Previous race: 2022 London ePrix	FIA Formula E World Championship; 2021–22 season	Next race: 2023 Mexico City ePrix
Previous race: N/A	Seoul ePrix	Next race: N/A
