= Norman Nato =

French racing driver (born 1992)

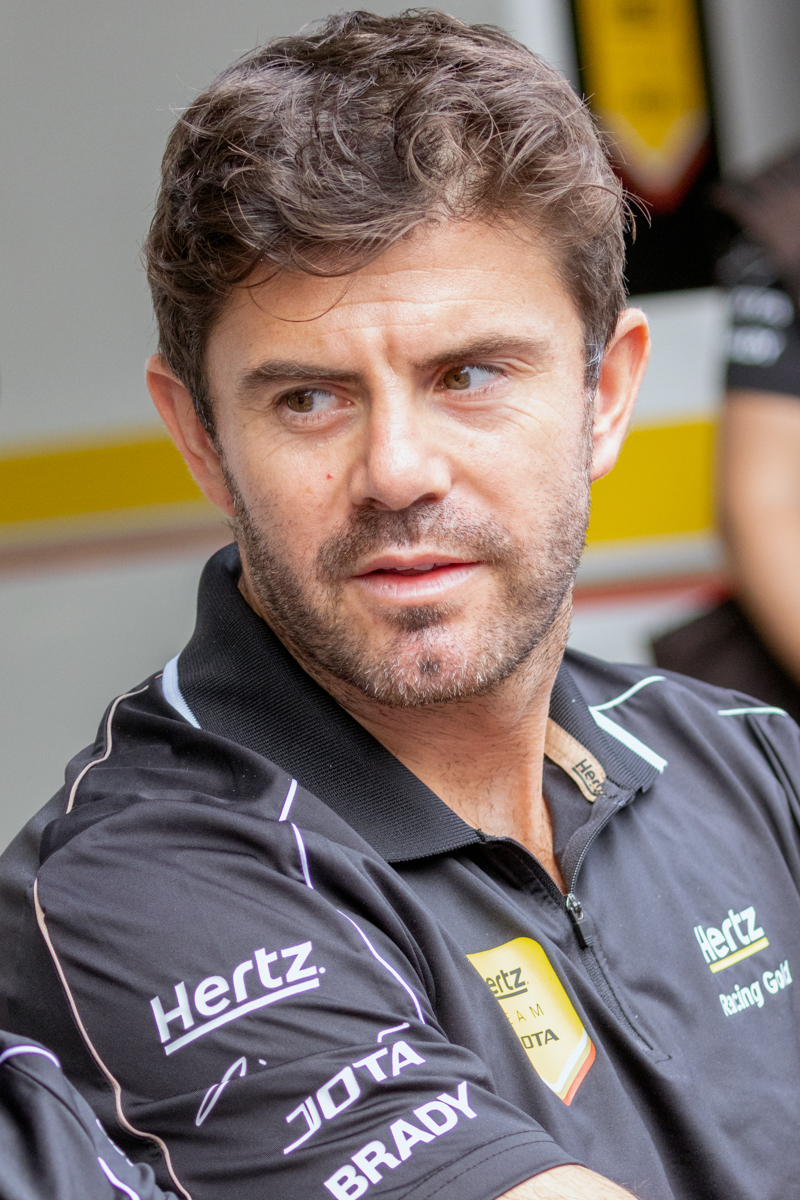
- Nato at the 2024 6 Hours of Fuji
- Nationality: (France) French
- Born: Norman Jean Claude Nato; 8 July 1992 (age 34) Cannes, France

Formula E career
- Debut season: 2020–21
- Categorisation: FIA Gold (2018–2026); FIA Platinum (2027–)
- Former teams: Venturi, Jaguar, Andretti, Nissan
- Starts: 67
- Wins: 1
- Podiums: 3
- Poles: 1
- Fastest laps: 6
- Best finish: 10th in 2022–23
- Finished last season: 20th (21 pts)

FIA World Endurance Championship career
- Debut season: 2018–19
- Current team: Cadillac Hertz Team Jota
- Car number: 12
- Former teams: Real team by WRT, Realteam Racing, Rebellion Racing, TDS Racing
- Starts: 43
- Championships: 0
- Wins: 4
- Podiums: 11
- Poles: 9
- Fastest laps: 3
- Best finish: 3rd in 2024 (LMP2)

Previous series
- 2018–2019 2017 2015–2016 2013–14 2012 2011 2010: European Le Mans Series; FIA Formula 2 Championship; GP2 Series; Formula Renault 3.5 Series; Eurocup Formula Renault 2.0; Formula Renault 2.0 Alps; Formula Renault 2.0 NEC; F4 Eurocup 1.6

Norman Jean Claude Nato (born 8 July 1992) is a French racing driver who competes in the FIA World Endurance Championship for Cadillac Hertz Team Jota.

Nato is a three-time overall WEC winner, with two victories in LMP1 for Rebellion and one in Hypercar for Cadillac. In Formula E, he won the 2021 Berlin ePrix for Venturi and spent three seasons at Nissan. In Formula One, he is a simulator driver for Ferrari. Nato previously had success in the European Le Mans Series, FIA Formula 2 and Formula Renault 3.5, including winning at Monaco in the latter in 2014.

== Career ==
=== Early career ===
==== Karting ====
Born on 8 July 1992, in Cannes, Nato began his karting career at the age of nine and won the Championnat de France "Minimes" and "Cadet" categories in 2004 and 2005 before winning the Copa Campeones Trophy KF2 in 2007. In 2009, Nato won the French KZ2 Championship which he followed with a win at the KZ2 Monaco Kart Cup in 2010.

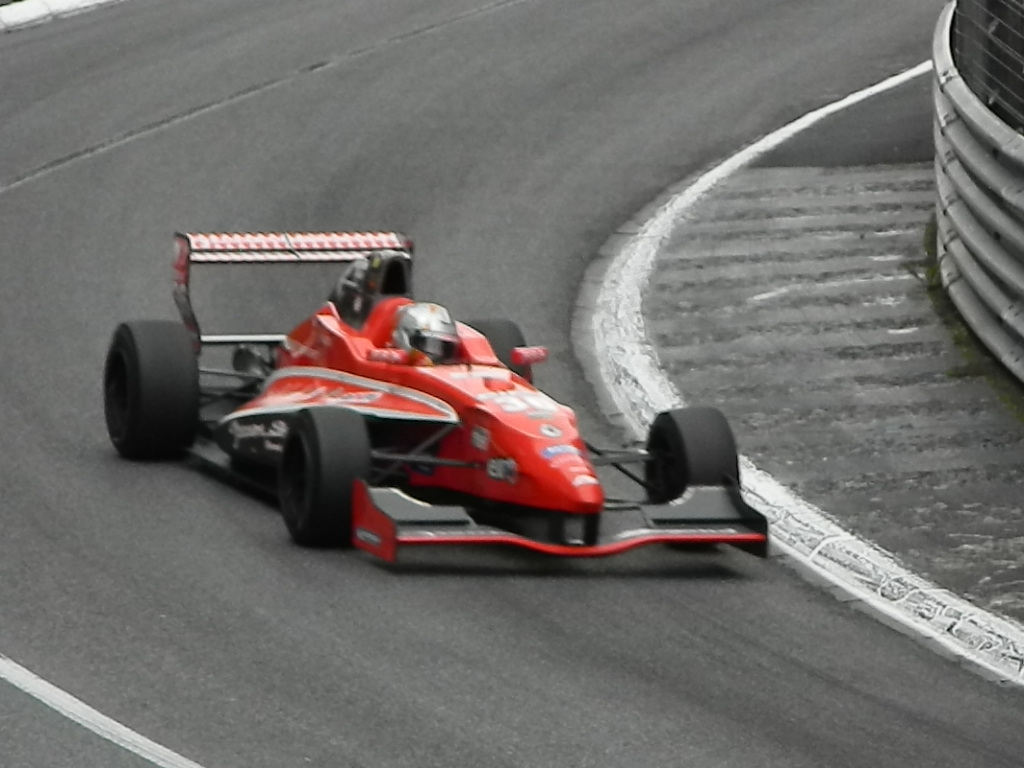
Nato during the 2012 Pau Grand Prix.

==== Formula Renault ====
Nato made his debut in single-seater competition in 2010 by joining the F4 F4 Eurocup 1.6 series with the Autosport Academy team. The Frenchman won on debut at the Ciudad del Motor de Aragón and took one further victory at the Circuit de Barcelona-Catalunya. Nato ended the season with eight podium finishes and 123 points to finish as runner-up to Stoffel Vandoorne.

In 2011, Nato graduated to Eurocup Formula Renault 2.0 with the R-ace GP team. He finished 11th overall after taking two podiums at the Nürburgring and the closing race of the season in Barcelona, with another five points-scoring finishes. He also partially competed in Formula Renault 2.0 Northern European Cup with the same team, bringing another podium at Nürburgring.

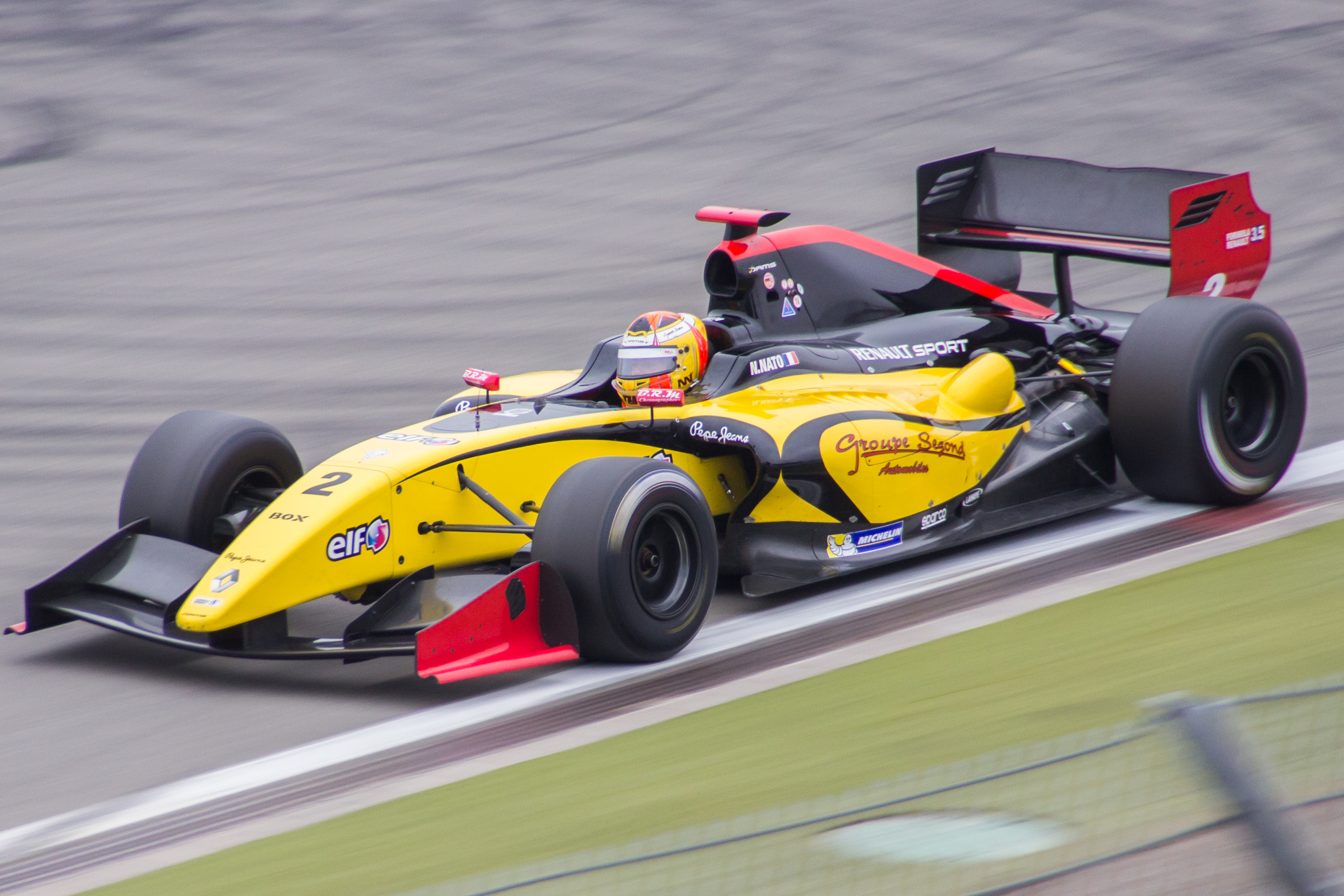
Nato driving at the Nürburgring during the 2014 Formula Renault 3.5 Series.

For 2012, Nato continued to race in the Eurocup but joined debutants RC Formula. He took one victory at Spa alongside three podium finishes at Aragon, the Nürburgring and the Hungaroring to finish fourth overall with 96 points.

Nato also raced in Formula Renault 2.0 Alps in 2012 and battled against Daniil Kvyat for the title. In the final race of the season in Barcelona, he was involved in an accident with Kvyat and finished as the runner-up with a three-point deficit. He ended the season with four wins and four further podium finishes.

Nato graduated to the highest tier of the World Series by Renault in 2013 by joining DAMS in the Formula Renault 3.5 Series as a team-mate to Kevin Magnussen. He took one pole position and finished 13th in the Drivers' Championship with 33 points.

Nato stayed on with the team for the 2014 season, this time partnering Carlos Sainz Jr. Nato took two victories which included a Grand Slam performance at the prestigious Monaco race in which he won from pole position and set the fastest lap. He finished seventh in the standings with 89 points.

==== GP2 Series ====
On 29 January 2015, it was confirmed that Arden International had signed Nato as its number one driver in the GP2 Series. He finished 18th overall with 20 points.

Nato joined Racing Engineering for the 2016 GP2 Series and won the opening race of the season in Barcelona. He finished on the podium again in Monaco, Hungary and Malaysia, and took one further victory at Monza to finish fifth in the Drivers' Championship with 136 points.

In 2017, Nato returned to Arden to start his third season in the Formula One feeder series, now renamed as Formula 2. He took one win after beating eventual champion Charles Leclerc at the Baku City Circuit and recorded two further podiums, finishing as the runner-up in the Bahrain and Silverstone Feature Races. Nato finished ninth overall, accumulating 91 points.

== European Le Mans Series ==
For the 2018 season, Nato made a switch to sportscar racing by joining the European Le Mans Series with Racing Engineering in the LMP2 class. He won the opening race of the season at Le Castellet alongside team-mates Paul Petit and Olivier Pla. Nato took one further podium at the Red Bull Ring to finish third in the championship standings with 66 points.

Alongside his ELMS campaign, Nato contested his first 24 Hours of Le Mans in which he finished in tenth place with SMP Racing. He also raced at the 2018 Petit Le Mans in the WeatherTech SportsCar Championship, finishing in 11th place with Tequila Patron ESM.

For 2019, Nato joined reigning ELMS champions G-Drive Racing and contested the opening two races of the season, taking fourth place at Le Castellet and winning at Monza.

== World Endurance Championship ==
Nato made his debut in the FIA World Endurance Championship in 2019 in which he raced at the 6 Hours of Spa with LMP2 team TDS Racing, taking fourth in class.

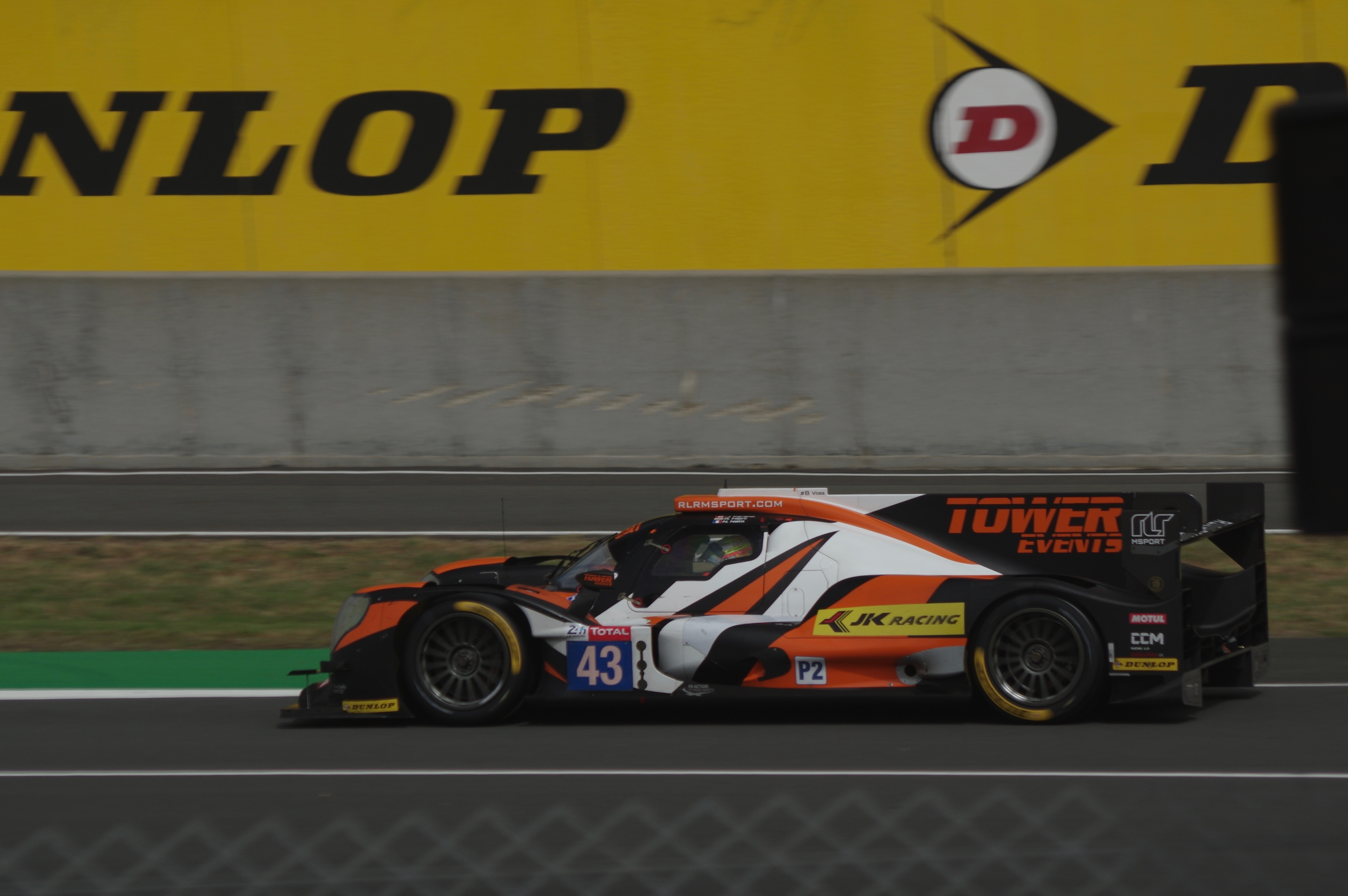
Nato during the 2019 24 Hours of Le Mans

For the 2019–20 season, Nato joined LMP1 team Rebellion Racing. The Frenchman took his first FIA World Endurance Championship victory at the 4 Hours of Shanghai and also won the 2020 Lone Star Le Mans at the Circuit of the Americas.

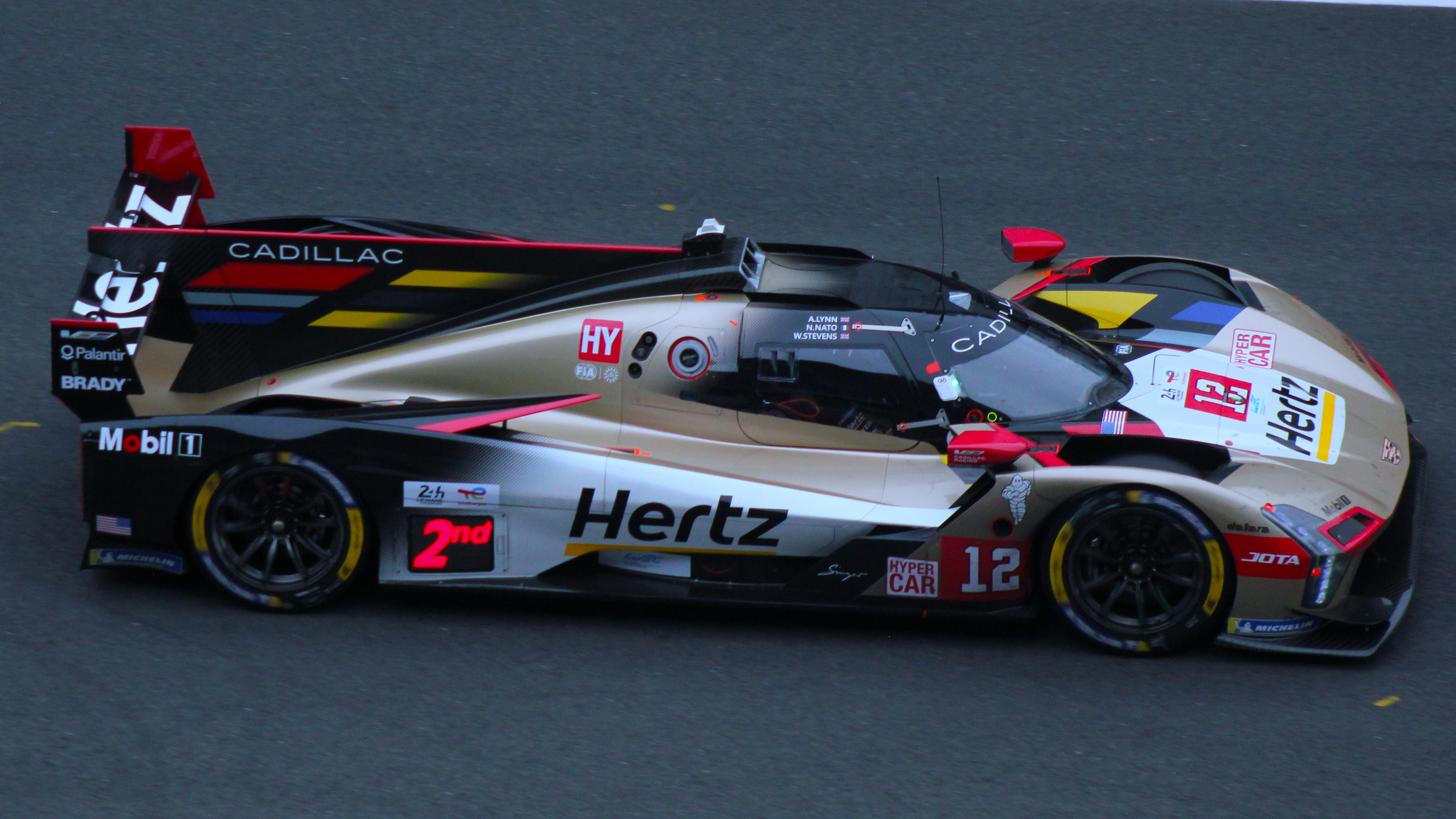
Nato's No. 12 car at the 2025 24 Hours of Le Mans

Nato took second place at the 88th running of the 24 Hours of Le Mans. He ended the campaign in third place in the Drivers' Championship alongside team-mates Gustavo Menezes and Bruno Senna, finishing on the podium on six occasions in seven entries.

For 2021, Nato joined Realteam Racing to compete in LMP2, partnering Loic Duval and team owner Esteban Garcia.

== Formula E ==
=== ROKiT Venturi Racing (2018–2021) ===
==== Reserve driver (2018–2020) ====
In 2018, Nato was named as Venturi Racing's reserve driver in Formula E. He took part in the series' official Rookie Test in Marrakesh and set the tenth-fastest time. He continued in the role into the 2019–20 season, and again took part in Formula E's official rookie test, taking sixth position.

==== 2020–21 season ====
In 2020, Nato was promoted to a full-time race seat with Venturi as a team-mate to Edoardo Mortara, replacing 11-time Formula One race winner Felipe Massa.

After making his debut at the 2021 Diriyah ePrix, Nato finished on the podium in only his fourth race start by taking third in Race 2 in Rome, however, was disqualified after overconsuming energy.

Two weekends later, Nato again finished inside the top-three by taking second place in Race 2 of the Valencia ePrix, but after receiving a five-second time penalty, was demoted to fifth.

After missing out on silverware twice, Nato finally finished on the podium by concluding his season with a dominant victory in Berlin, taking Venturi's third win in Formula E. With this result, and outside of Formula E's inaugural campaign, Nato became only the third driver to win a race in their rookie season. Nato finished in 18th position in the Drivers' Championship with 54 points, becoming Venturi's most successful rookie driver in history.

Nato was replaced by Lucas di Grassi on 15 September 2021 for Season 8.

=== Jaguar TCS Racing (2022) ===
==== 2021–22 season ====
After failing to secure a full-time drive, Nato joined Jaguar Racing as the team's reserve driver, partnering former Venturi driver Tom Dillmann. Nato stepped up to a race seat for the final weekend of the campaign in Seoul, deputising for Sam Bird who sustained a fracture in his left hand during the previous race weekend in London.

=== Nissan Formula E Team (2023) ===
==== 2022–23 season ====
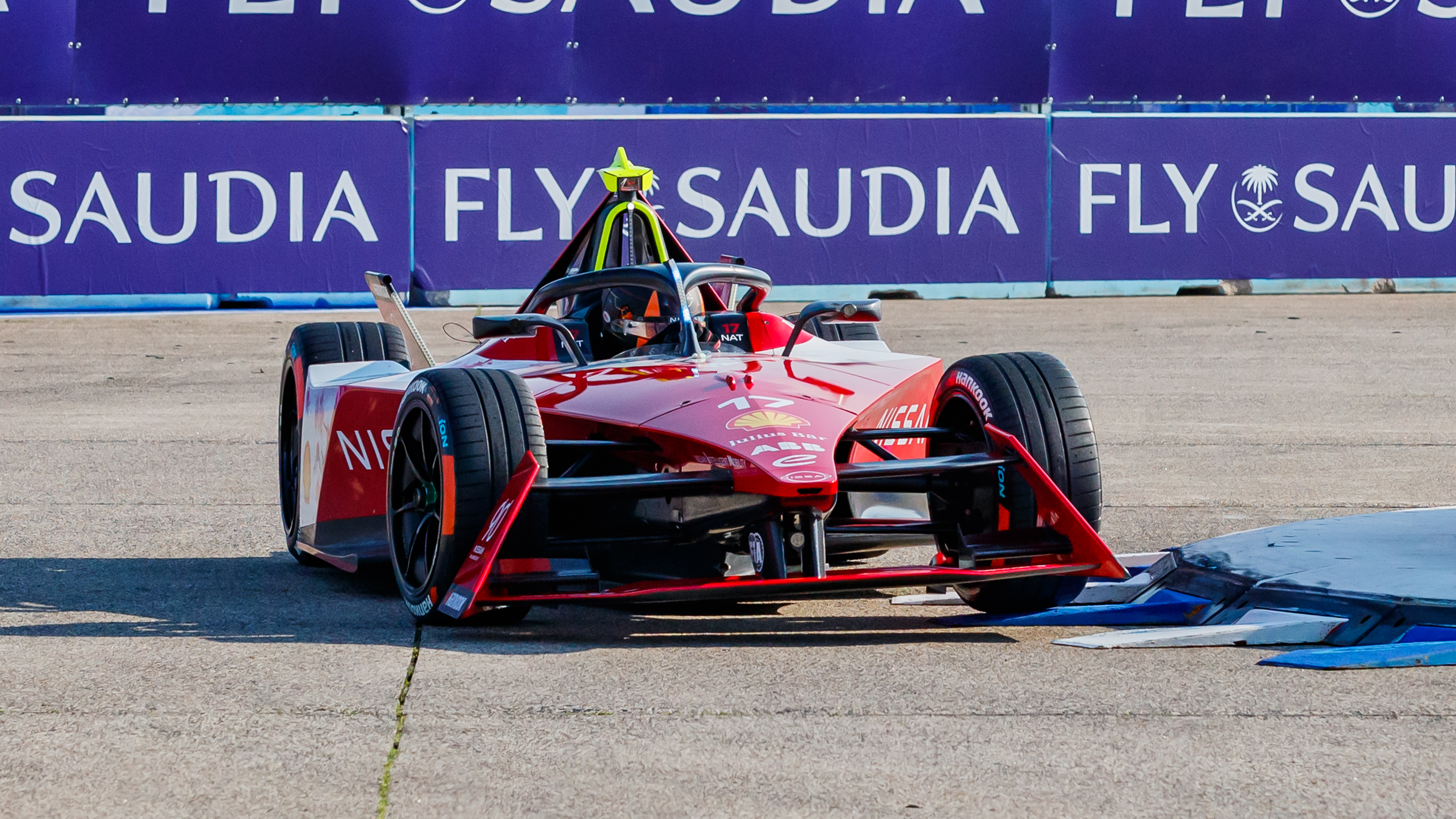
Nato during the 2023 Berlin ePrix

Nato returned to a full-time Formula E seat for the 2022–23 season, partnering Sacha Fenestraz at Nissan. During the season opener at Mexico City, the Frenchman was forced to retire from the race after Robin Frijns crashed into the rear of the Frenchman's car on the first lap. Nato opened his points tally with a seventh place at Hyderabad, before finishing eighth in Cape Town. Having experienced a race-ending collision on the opening lap of the São Paulo ePrix, Nato would fail to score points in the subsequent events at Berlin and Monaco, a race he had started from third position. Nato bounced back from Jakarta onwards, in part as a result of a software upgrade brought in by Nissan after the Berlin round, scoring points in the remaining six races. This run included a podium in Rome, where Nato managed his car's energy to the limit to finish second, as well as two further top-five finishes. Despite this string of results, which resulted in Nato finishing tenth in the championship and helping Nissan to finish ahead of customer team McLaren in the teams' standings, Nato departed the team after the end of the campaign.

=== Andretti Formula E (2024) ===
==== 2023–24 season ====
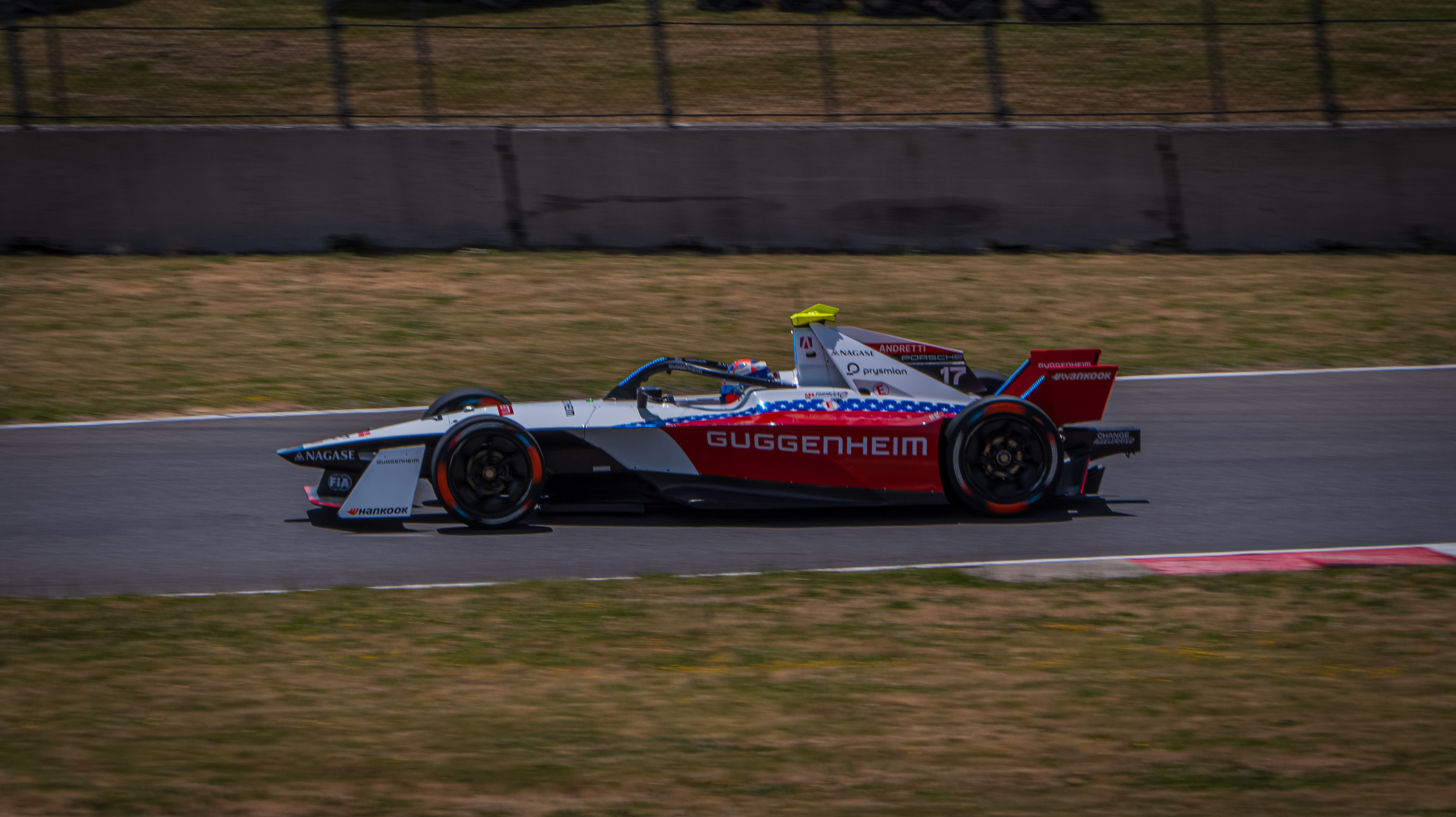
Nato during the 2024 Portland ePrix

For the 2023–24 season, Nato switched to Andretti, replacing André Lotterer to partner reigning champion Jake Dennis. During the season opener at Mexico City, he managed to finish at the tenth position.

Nato would part ways with Andretti at the end of the season.

=== Return to Nissan (2024–2026) ===
==== 2024–25 season ====
Nato would return to Nissan for the 2024–25 season, replacing Sacha Fenestraz and partnering former rival Oliver Rowland.

Nato competed throughout the season but struggled for consistent results compared to his teammate and the front runners.

Nato scored 21 championship points over the course of the campaign and ultimately finished 20th in the Drivers’ Championship. His season was highlighted by flashes of competitiveness, including a top-10 finish at the London E-Prix where he climbed from 16th on the grid to ninth overall, earning valuable points late in the season.

A notable moment of the season came at the Miami E-Prix, where Nato claimed his first Formula E pole position and crossed the line first in the race, only for the result to be rescinded due to a post-race penalty for incorrect Attack Mode usage.

Throughout the year, Nato faced challenges adapting to the Gen3 Evo machinery, often trailing his teammate Oliver Rowland, who emerged as a championship contender and ultimately clinched the title. Despite early difficulties and comparisons with Rowland’s strong performance, Nato’s points-scoring run in the latter part of the season helped solidify his standing in the championship.

==== 2025–26 season ====
Despite a relatively disappointing season, Nato was retained by Nissan alongside Oliver Rowland for the 2025–26 season.

Shortly after the London ePrix, Nato announced his departure from the team and the championship at the end of the season.

== Formula One ==
Nato began working for the Scuderia Ferrari as a simulator driver in 2025. On 26 August 2026, Nato conducted his first Formula One test, sampling a Ferrari SF-25 at Mugello.

== Racing record ==
=== Career summary ===
Season	Series	Team	Races	Wins	Poles	F/Laps	Podiums	Points	Position
2010	F4 Eurocup 1.6	Auto Sport Academy	14	2	0	1	8	131	**2nd**
2011	Eurocup Formula Renault 2.0	R-ace GP	14	0	0	0	2	58	11th
2011	Formula Renault 2.0 NEC	R-ace GP	7	0	1	0	1	56	25th
2012	Eurocup Formula Renault 2.0	RC Formula	14	1	0	1	4	96	4th
2012	Formula Renault 2.0 Alps	RC Formula	14	4	5	5	8	214	**2nd**
2012	French F4 Championship	Auto Sport Academy	0	0	0	0	0	0	NC
2013	Formula Renault 3.5 Series	DAMS	17	0	1	0	0	33	13th
2014	Formula Renault 3.5 Series	DAMS	17	2	1	1	2	89	7th
2015	GP2 Series	Arden International	21	0	0	1	0	20	18th
2016	GP2 Series	Racing Engineering	22	2	1	1	5	136	5th
2017	FIA Formula 2 Championship	Pertamina Arden	22	1	0	0	3	91	9th
2018	European Le Mans Series - LMP2	Racing Engineering	6	1	0	2	2	66	**3rd**
2018	24 Hours of Le Mans - LMP2	SMP Racing	1	0	0	0	0	N/A	10th
2018	IMSA SportsCar Championship - Prototype	Tequila Patrón ESM	1	0	0	0	0	20	56th
2018–19	FIA World Endurance Championship - LMP2	TDS Racing	1	0	0	0	0	12	16th
2018–19	Formula E	Venturi Formula E Team	Reserve driver						
2019	European Le Mans Series - LMP2	G-Drive Racing	2	1	1	0	1	38	11th
2019	Blancpain GT Series Endurance Cup	Belgian Audi Club Team WRT	3	0	0	0	0	0	NC
2019	Italian GT Endurance Championship - GT3	Audi Sport Italia	1	0	0	0	1	?	?
2019	24 Hours of Le Mans - LMP2	RLR M Sport/Tower Events	1	0	0	0	0	N/A	NC
2019	Lamborghini Super Trofeo Asia - Pro	Kamlung Racing Team							
2019–20	FIA World Endurance Championship	Rebellion Racing	7	2	3	1	6	145	**3rd**
2019–20	Formula E	ROKiT Venturi Racing	Reserve driver						
2020	24 Hours of Le Mans	Rebellion Racing	1	0	0	0	1	N/A	**2nd**
2020–21	Formula E	ROKiT Venturi Racing	15	1	0	1	1	54	18th
2021	FIA World Endurance Championship - LMP2	Realteam Racing	6	0	0	1	0	50	10th
2021	24 Hours of Le Mans - LMP2	Realteam Racing	1	0	0	0	0	N/A	12th
2021–22	Formula E	Jaguar TCS Racing	2	0	0	0	0	0	22nd
2022	FIA World Endurance Championship - LMP2	RealTeam by WRT	6	1	1	1	3	96	4th
2022	24 Hours of Le Mans - LMP2	RealTeam by WRT	1	0	0	1	0	N/A	17th
2022–23	Formula E	Nissan Formula E Team	16	0	0	0	1	63	10th
2023	24 Hours of Le Mans - LMP2	AF Corse	1	0	0	0	0	N/A	DNF
2023–24	Formula E	Andretti Formula E Team	16	0	0	3	1	47	15th
2024	FIA World Endurance Championship - Hypercar	Hertz Team Jota	7	0	0	0	1	45	10th
2024–25	Formula E	Nissan Formula E Team	14	0	1	1	0	21	20th
2025	FIA World Endurance Championship - Hypercar	Cadillac Hertz Team Jota	8	1	3	0	1	93	4th
2025	IMSA SportsCar Championship - GTP	Cadillac Wayne Taylor Racing	1	0	0	0	0	250	38th
2025	Formula One	Scuderia Ferrari HP	Simulator driver						
2025–26	Formula E	Nissan Formula E Team	17	0	0	0	0	20	19th
2026	FIA World Endurance Championship - Hypercar	Cadillac Hertz Team Jota	8	0	1	0	1	58	11th
2026	Formula One	Scuderia Ferrari HP	Simulator driver						

=== Complete F4 Eurocup 1.6 results ===
(key) (Races in bold indicate pole position) (Races in italics indicate fastest lap)

Year	1	2	3	4	5	6	7	8	9	10	11	12	13	14	Pos	Points
2010	ALC; 1; 1	ALC; 2; 3	SPA; 1; 7	SPA; 2; 7	MAG; 1; 6	MAG; 2; 5	HUN; 1; 2	HUN; 2; 2	HOC; 1; 2	HOC; 2; 4	SIL; 1; 3	SIL; 2; 6	CAT; 1; 3	**CAT**; **2**; 1	2nd	123
2012	LÉD; 1	LÉD; 2	PAU; 1	PAU; 2	VDV; 1	VDV; 2	MAG; 1	MAG; 2	NAV; 1	NAV; 2	LMS; 1	LMS; 2	LEC; 1 DNS	LEC; 2 DNS	NC	0

=== Complete Formula Renault 2.0 NEC results ===
(key) (Races in bold indicate pole position) (Races in italics indicate fastest lap)

Year	Entrant	1	2	3	4	5	6	7	8	9	10	11	12	13	14	15	16	17	18	19	20	DC	Points
2011	R-ace GP	HOC; 1 Ret	HOC; 2 Ret	HOC; 3; 6	SPA; 1 Ret	SPA; 2 Ret	NÜR; 1; 4	**NÜR**; **2**; 2	ASS; 1	ASS; 2	ASS; 3	OSC; 1	OSC; 2	ZAN; 1	ZAN; 2	MST; 1	MST; 2	MST; 3	MNZ; 1	MNZ; 2	MNZ; 3	25th	56

=== Complete Eurocup Formula Renault 2.0 results ===
(key) (Races in bold indicate pole position) (Races in italics indicate fastest lap)

Year	Team	1	2	3	4	5	6	7	8	9	10	11	12	13	14	Pos	Points
2011	R-ace GP	ALC; 1 DSQ	ALC; 2; 8	SPA; 1 Ret	SPA; 2 Ret	NÜR; 1; 3	NÜR; 2 Ret	HUN; 1; 13	HUN; 2; 8	SIL; 1 Ret	SIL; 2; 9	LEC; 1; 7	LEC; 2; 4	CAT; 1 Ret	CAT; 2; 3	11th	58
2012	RC Formula	ALC; 1; 4	ALC; 2; 3	SPA; 1; 1	SPA; 2 Ret	NÜR; 1; 2	NÜR; 2 Ret	MSC; 1; 23	MSC; 2; 9	HUN; 1; 6	HUN; 2; 3	LEC; 1; 10	LEC; 2; 17	CAT; 1; 15	CAT; 2; 16	4th	96

=== Complete Formula Renault 2.0 Alps Series results ===
(key) (Races in bold indicate pole position; races in italics indicate fastest lap)

Year	Team	1	2	3	4	5	6	7	8	9	10	11	12	13	14	Pos	Points
2012	RC Formula	MNZ; 1; 5	MNZ; 2; 4	**PAU**; **1**; 1	PAU; 2; 2	**IMO**; **1**; 1	**IMO**; **2**; 1	**SPA**; **1**; 23	SPA; 2; 2	RBR; 1; 10	RBR; 2; 6	MUG; 1; 2	MUG; 2; 2	**CAT**; **1**; 1	CAT; 2 Ret	2nd	214

=== Complete Formula Renault 3.5 Series results ===
(key) (Races in bold indicate pole position) (Races in italics indicate fastest lap)

Year	Team	1	2	3	4	5	6	7	8	9	10	11	12	13	14	15	16	17	Pos	Points
2013	DAMS	MNZ; 1; 10	MNZ; 2; 6	ALC; 1; 5	**ALC**; **2**; 20	MON; 1 Ret	SPA; 1; 15	SPA; 2; 15	MSC; 1; 13	MSC; 2; 10	RBR; 1 Ret	RBR; 2; 10	HUN; 1; 15	HUN; 2; 11	LEC; 1; 18	LEC; 2; 9	CAT; 1 Ret	CAT; 2; 5	13th	33
2014	DAMS	MNZ; 1; 15	MNZ; 2; 11	ALC; 1; 11	ALC; 2; 10	**MON**; **1**; 1	SPA; 1; 5	SPA; 2; 5	MSC; 1; 17	MSC; 2; 16	NÜR; 1; 12	NÜR; 2; 6	HUN; 1; 8	HUN; 2; 1	LEC; 1; 10	LEC; 2 Ret	JER; 1; 8	JER; 2; 10	7th	89

=== Complete GP2 Series/FIA Formula 2 Championship results ===
(key) (Races in bold indicate pole position) (Races in italics indicate fastest lap)

Year	Entrant	1	2	3	4	5	6	7	8	9	10	11	12	13	14	15	16	17	18	19	20	21	22	DC	Points
2015	Arden International	BHR; FEA; Ret	BHR; SPR; 16	CAT; FEA; 8	CAT; SPR; 7	MON; FEA; 18	MON; SPR; 21	RBR; FEA; 20	RBR; SPR; 13	SIL; FEA; 18	SIL; SPR; 23	HUN; FEA; 11	HUN; SPR; 6	SPA; FEA; Ret	SPA; SPR; 20	MNZ; FEA; 6	MNZ; SPR; Ret	SOC; FEA; 12	SOC; SPR; 9	BHR; FEA; 24	BHR; SPR; 10	YMC; FEA; Ret	YMC; SPR; C	18th	20
2016	Racing Engineering	CAT; FEA; 1	CAT; SPR; 16	MON; FEA; 2	MON; SPR; 6	BAK; FEA; Ret	BAK; SPR; Ret	RBR; FEA; 7	RBR; SPR; 12	**SIL**; **FEA**; 7	SIL; SPR; 22†	HUN; FEA; 7	HUN; SPR; 3	HOC; FEA; Ret	HOC; SPR; 18	SPA; FEA; Ret	SPA; SPR; 8	MNZ; FEA; 5	MNZ; SPR; 1	SEP; FEA; 3	SEP; SPR; Ret	YMC; FEA; 6	YMC; SPR; 5	5th	136
2017	Pertamina Arden	BHR; FEA; 2	BHR; SPR; Ret	CAT; FEA; 16	CAT; SPR; 13	MON; FEA; Ret	MON; SPR; Ret	BAK; FEA; 5	BAK; SPR; 1	RBR; FEA; Ret	RBR; SPR; 7	SIL; FEA; 2	SIL; SPR; 6	HUN; FEA; 7	HUN; SPR; 5	SPA; FEA; 8	SPA; SPR; 4	MNZ; FEA; 13	MNZ; SPR; 10	JER; FEA; 11	JER; SPR; 10	YMC; FEA; 13	YMC; SPR; 18†	9th	91

^{†} Driver did not finish the race, but was classified as he completed over 90% of the race distance.

=== Complete European Le Mans Series results ===
Year	Entrant	Class	Chassis	Engine	1	2	3	4	5	6	Rank	Points
2018	Racing Engineering	LMP2	Oreca 07	Gibson GK428 4.2 L V8	LEC; 1	MNZ; 5	RBR; 2	SIL; Ret	SPA; 7‡	ALG; 5	3rd	66
2019	G-Drive Racing	LMP2	Aurus 01	Gibson GK428 4.2 L V8	**LEC**; 4	MNZ; 1	CAT	SIL	SPA	ALG	11th	38

^{‡} Half points awarded as less than 75% of race distance was completed.

=== Complete 24 Hours of Le Mans results ===
Year	Team	Co-Drivers	Car	Class	Laps	Pos.	Class Pos.
2018	(Russia) SMP Racing	(Russia) Viktor Shaytar (United Kingdom) Harrison Newey	Dallara P217-Gibson	LMP2	345	14th	10th
2019	(United Kingdom) RLR M Sport/Tower Events	(Canada) John Farano (India) Arjun Maini	Oreca 07-Gibson	LMP2	295	NC	NC
2020	(Switzerland) Rebellion Racing	(United States) Gustavo Menezes (Brazil) Bruno Senna	Rebellion R13-Gibson	LMP1	382	**2nd**	**2nd**
2021	(Switzerland) Realteam Racing	(Switzerland) Esteban García (France) Loïc Duval	Oreca 07-Gibson	LMP2	356	17th	12th
2021	(Switzerland) Realteam Racing	(Switzerland) Esteban García (France) Loïc Duval	Oreca 07-Gibson	LMP2 Pro-Am	356	17th	3rd
2022	(Switzerland) RealTeam by WRT	(Angola) Rui Andrade (Austria) Ferdinand Habsburg	Oreca 07-Gibson	LMP2	362	21st	17th
2023	(Italy) AF Corse	(United Kingdom) Ben Barnicoat (France) François Perrodo	Oreca 07-Gibson	LMP2	183	DNF	DNF
2023	(Italy) AF Corse	(United Kingdom) Ben Barnicoat (France) François Perrodo	Oreca 07-Gibson	LMP2 Pro-Am	183	DNF	DNF
2024	(United Kingdom) Hertz Team Jota	(United Kingdom) Callum Ilott (United Kingdom) Will Stevens	Porsche 963	Hypercar	311	8th	8th
2025	(United States) Cadillac Hertz Team Jota	(United Kingdom) Alex Lynn (United Kingdom) Will Stevens	Cadillac V-Series.R	Hypercar	387	4th	4th
2026	(United States) Cadillac Hertz Team Jota	(Switzerland) Louis Delétraz (United Kingdom) Will Stevens	Cadillac V-Series.R	Hypercar	381	4th	4th

=== Complete FIA World Endurance Championship results ===
Year	Entrant	Class	Chassis	Engine	1	2	3	4	5	6	7	8	Rank	Points
2018–19	TDS Racing	LMP2	Oreca 07	Gibson GK428 4.2 L V8	SPA	LMS	SIL	FUJ	SHA	SEB	SPA; 4	LMS	16th	12
2019–20	Rebellion Racing	LMP1	Rebellion R13	Gibson GL458 4.5 L V8	SIL; 9	FUJ; 3	**SHA**; 1	**BHR**; 3	**COA**; 1	**SPA**; 3	LMS; 2	BHR	3rd	145
2021	Realteam Racing	LMP2	Oreca 07	Gibson GK428 4.2 L V8	SPA; 6	ALG; 7	MNZ; 7	LMS; 7	BHR; 7	BHR; 7			10th	50
2022	RealTeam by WRT	LMP2	Oreca 07	Gibson GK428 4.2 L V8	SEB; 3	SPA; 2	LMS; 10	MNZ; 1	FUJ; 4	**BHR**; 5			4th	96
2024	Hertz Team Jota	Hypercar	Porsche 963	Porsche 9RD 4.6 L Turbo V8	QAT; 2	IMO; 14	SPA	LMS; 8	SÃO; 18	COA; Ret	FUJ; 5	BHR; 13	10th	45
2025	Cadillac Hertz Team Jota	Hypercar	Cadillac V-Series.R	Cadillac LMC55R 5.5 L V8	QAT; 8	IMO; 10	SPA; 5	**LMS**; 4	**SÃO**; 1	COA; 8	**FUJ**; 6	BHR; 6	5th	93
2026	Cadillac Hertz Team Jota	Hypercar	Cadillac V-Series.R	Cadillac LMC55R 5.5 L V8	IMO; 13	SPA; 9	LMS; 4	**SÃO**; 3	COA; 9	FUJ; 7	CAT; 6	MNZ; Ret	11th	58

=== Complete IMSA SportsCar Championship results ===
(key) (Races in bold indicate pole position) (Races in italics indicate fastest lap)

Year	Team	Class	Make	Engine	1	2	3	4	5	6	7	8	9	10	Pos.	Points
2018	Tequila Patrón ESM	P	Nissan Onroak DPi	Nissan VR38DETT 3.8 L Turbo V6	DAY	SEB	LBH	MDO	DET	WGL	MOS	ELK	LGA	PET; 11	56th	20
2025	Cadillac Wayne Taylor Racing	GTP	Cadillac V-Series.R	Cadillac LMC55R 5.5 L V8	DAY	SEB	LBH	LGA	DET	WGL	ELK	IMS	PET; 8		38th	250

=== Complete Formula E results ===
(key) (Races in bold indicate pole position; races in italics indicate fastest lap)

Year	Team	Chassis	Powertrain	1	2	3	4	5	6	7	8	9	10	11	12	13	14	15	16	17	Pos	Points
2020–21	ROKiT Venturi Racing	Spark SRT05e	Mercedes-Benz EQ Silver Arrow 02	DIR; 14	DIR; 16	RME; 11	RME; DSQ	VLC; NC	VLC; 5	MCO; 13	PUE; 14	PUE; Ret	NYC; 15	NYC; 7	LDN; NC	LDN; Ret	BER; 4	BER; 1			18th	54
2021–22	Jaguar TCS Racing	Spark SRT05e	Jaguar I-Type 5	DRH	DRH	MEX	RME	RME	MCO	BER	BER	JAK	MRK	NYC	NYC	LDN	LDN	SEO; 13	SEO; 14		22nd	0
2022–23	Nissan Formula E Team	Formula E Gen3	Nissan e-4ORCE 04	MEX; Ret	DRH; 12	DRH; 14	HYD; 7	CAP; 8	SAP; Ret	BER; 13	BER; 16	MCO; 18	JAK; 12	JAK; 5	POR; 9	RME; 8	RME; 2	LDN; 8	LDN; 4		10th	63
2023–24	Andretti Global	Formula E Gen3	Porsche 99X Electric	MEX; 10	DRH; 6	DRH; 16	SAP; 17	TOK; 6	MIS; 7	MIS; 16	MCO; 10	BER; 18	BER; 19	SIC; 14	SIC; 3	POR; 13	POR; 7	LDN; 10	LDN; 12		15th	47
2024–25	Nissan Formula E Team	Formula E Gen3 Evo	Nissan e-4ORCE 05	SAO; 13	MEX; 13	JED; 18	JED; 15	**MIA**; 6	MCO; 14	MCO; 13	TKO; 15	TKO; 17	SHA; 6	SHA; 21	JKT; 14	BER	BER	LDN; 9	LDN; 11		20th	21
2025–26	Nissan Formula E Team	Formula E Gen3 Evo	Nissan e-4ORCE 05	SAO; Ret	MEX; 10	MIA; 17	JED; 13	JED; 17	MAD; 11	BER; 18	BER; 5	MCO; 14	MCO; Ret	SAN; Ret	SHA; 20	SHA; 17	TKO; 16	TKO; 6	LDN; 15	LDN; 10	19th	20

^{*} Season still in progress.
