= Sport in Saudi Arabia =

Sport in Saudi Arabia is an important part of Saudi Arabian culture and the country participates in many international sporting competitions along with multiple esport competitions. Football is a particularly popular sport and Saudi Arabia has won the Asian Cup on three occasions, while other sports such as cricket and basketball are also widely followed.

In December 2019, the Saudi Arabian Olympic Committee approved the launch of five new sports federations each for hockey, lacrosse, rugby, baseball and softball, thus taking another step towards diversifying the country's sports landscape.

== Football ==
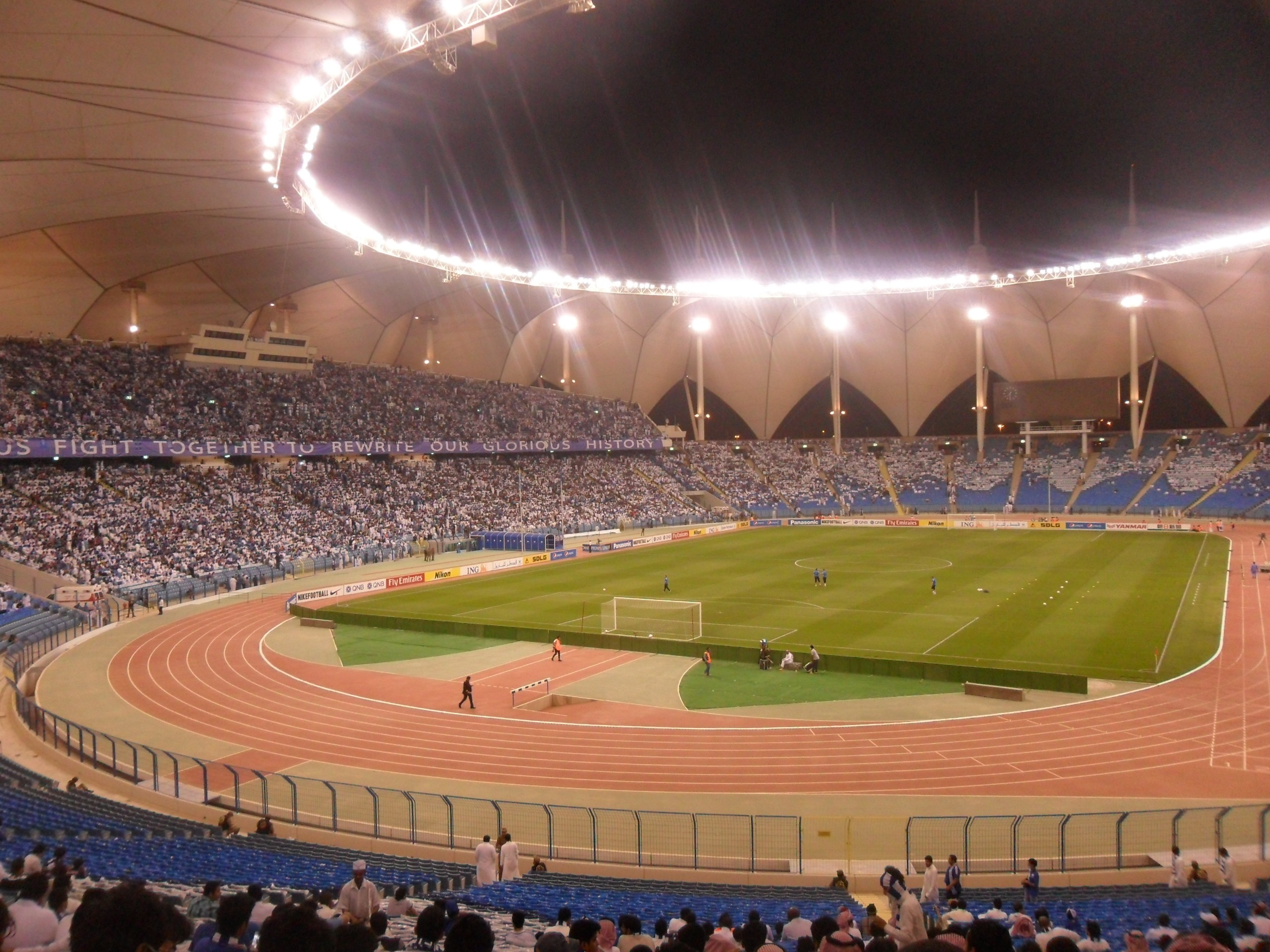
King Fahd International Stadium

Football is the most popular sport in Saudi Arabia. In recent years, the sport has grown in popularity, and some Saudi players currently play in Europe. The Saudi Arabia national football team is governed by the Saudi Football Federation (SFF). The SFF organises the Saudi leagues, and the Saudi Arabian Cup. The Saudi national team has competed in six FIFA World Cup competitions, in 1994, 1998, 2002, 2006, 2018, 2022 and most recently, in 2026. The Saudi team has also competed in seven AFC Asian Cup competitions, first in 1984. Achievements from the AFC Cup include being the Champions in 1984, 1988, and recently, in 1996. The current player of the year is Hussein Sulaimani, who is the captain of Saudi Arabia football team. Saudi Arabia also regularly participate in the Arabian Gulf Cup, AFC Champions League, and Arab Nations Cup. The kingdom is set to host Supercopa de Espana for the first time. However, the response of international fans, especially from Spain, hasn't been too well, with only under 10% of the tickets been sold until now. Saudi Arabia will host two big football competitions in the coming years: the AFC Asian Cup in 2027 and the FIFA World Cup in 2034.

== Motorsport ==
The Formula 1 Powerboat World Championship held a race at Sunset Beach in 2004. The 2019 edition was cancelled due to bad weather. The 2020 edition was cancelled due to COVID-19 pandemic.

The Dakar Rally cross-country race is held in Saudi Arabia since 2020; local driver Yazeed Al-Rajhi won the cars category in 2025.

The 2018 Race of Champions was held at King Fahd International Stadium.

Saudi Arabia hosts a Formula E electric car race since 2018, originally at Diriyah and currently at Jeddah.

The Saudi Arabian Grand Prix Formula One race is held since 2021 at Jeddah. The venue also hosted the FIA WTCR in 2022 and the GT World Challenge Europe in 2024.

=== Diriyah ePrix ===
Edition		Track	Winner	Pole position	Fastest lap
2018		Riyadh Street Circuit	(Portugal) António Félix da Costa	(Portugal) António Félix da Costa	(Germany) André Lotterer
2019	Race 1	Riyadh Street Circuit	(United Kingdom) Sam Bird	(United Kingdom) Alexander Sims	(New Zealand) Mitch Evans
2019	Race 2	Riyadh Street Circuit	(United Kingdom) Alexander Sims	(United Kingdom) Alexander Sims	(Portugal) António Félix da Costa
2021	Race 1	Riyadh Street Circuit	(Netherlands) Nyck de Vries	(Netherlands) Nyck de Vries	(Belgium) Stoffel Vandoorne
2021	Race 2	Riyadh Street Circuit	(United Kingdom) Sam Bird	(Netherlands) Robin Frijns	(Netherlands) Nyck de Vries
2022	Race 1	Riyadh Street Circuit	(Netherlands) Nyck de Vries	(Belgium) Stoffel Vandoorne	(New Zealand) Nick Cassidy
2022	Race 2	Riyadh Street Circuit	(Switzerland) Edoardo Mortara	(Netherlands) Nyck de Vries	(United Kingdom) Sam Bird
2023	Race 1	Riyadh Street Circuit	(Germany) Pascal Wehrlein	(Switzerland) Sébastien Buemi	(Germany) René Rast
2023	Race 2	Riyadh Street Circuit	(Germany) Pascal Wehrlein	(United Kingdom) Jake Hughes	(United Kingdom) Sam Bird

In 2021, Formula One announced they were going to Saudi Arabia for the first time, with racing held in Jeddah across the Red Sea.

=== Saudi Arabian Grand Prix ===
Edition	Driver	Car
2021	(United Kingdom) Lewis Hamilton	Mercedes
2022	(Netherlands) Max Verstappen	Red Bull Racing-RBPT
2023	(Mexico) Sergio Pérez	Red Bull Racing-Honda RBPT
2024	(Netherlands) Max Verstappen	Red Bull Racing-Honda RBPT
2025	(Australia) Oscar Piastri	McLaren-Mercedes

== Cricket ==
Cricket is the second most popular sport in Saudi Arabia, largely due to the increasing number of South Asian expatriates who play the game during their spare time. However, during recent years cricket has generated interest among many Arab locals, such as Faique Habib and Nadim Al Nadwi, who have both represented Saudi Arabia at the national level. Currently there are over 8000 Saudi cricketers, with nearly 20 percent being local Arabs, and the majority of the rest coming from countries such as Pakistan, India and Sri Lanka.

There are many cricket associations Saudi Arabia, with Yanbu Al Sinaiyah Cricket Association being the largest. Each major city has its own organization which holds its own domestic cup for each format.

Since 2010 Saudi Arabia has gained quite a lot of fame for its style of cricket, as it has won several regional tournaments on turf, even though back home players only play on concrete. Saudi Arabia's biggest win to date was in September 2016, where they beat a Namibian national side by 141 runs. 2 months later they also won their first major series which came in the form of a quadrangular series also involving Kenya, Uganda and Qatar.

Saudi Arabia's greatest cricketer is Shoaib Ali, who has contributed to major victories both home and away, and who has captained the nation since 2008. He is a bowling all rounder who made his debut against Thailand in the 2008 ACC Under-19 Challenge Cup.

== Basketball ==
Basketball is also a popular sport in Saudi Arabia. The Saudi Premier League has been home to several players who competed at the FIBA Asia Championship and has also attracted NBA players such as Mahmoud Abdul-Rauf.

Besides "regular" basketball, 3x3 basketball has become increasingly popular.

== Esports ==
In September 2022, Saudi Arabia presented the National Gaming and Esports Strategy (NGES), which aims to make the country a global center for the video game industry by 2030 in accordance to Saudi Vision 2030, a strategic plan led by Crown Prince Mohammed bin Salman to diversify the Saudi economy, create job opportunities, and reduce reliance on oil.

Pursuant to the NGES, in October 2023, Saudi Arabia announced the inaugural Esports World Cup as the successor of Gamers8, the Saudi Esports Federation's previously existing esports festival, which would be held annually in Riyadh starting in summer 2024. The 2024 Esports World Cup encompassed 23 tournaments across its 22 competitive titles. Each tournament adhered to its own unique format and rules, while 22 of the tournaments contributed to a larger competition known as the Club Championship.

The inaugural Olympic Esports Games are planned to be hosted in Riyadh in 2027.

In August 2025, the Esports World Cup Foundation announced the biennial Esports Nations Cup, a multi-title national-team tournament, with the inaugural finals scheduled for November 2026 in Riyadh before adopting a rotating-host model. The first edition is being co-developed with Electronic Arts, Krafton, Tencent and Ubisoft. Saudi Arabia is slated to host the debut event, with organisers projecting participation from more than 100 nations across roughly 15 titles and around 1,500 players qualifying to the finals.

== Ice hockey ==
Ice hockey is also a minor sport but it has not been popular in Saudi Arabia; the first game occurred in 2010 during the Gulf Ice Hockey Championship.

== Professional wrestling ==
Professional wrestling has been a recognizable minor sport in Saudi Arabia. The country has hosted first event by the U.S.-based promotion, WWE in Jeddah dubbed the Greatest Royal Rumble on April 27, 2018. The company has since hosted more events with the recent being Crown Jewel (2026) in Riyadh.

WWE's programming (e.g. WWE Wal3ooha) airs throughout the country on OSN Sports Action 1 and has access to the WWE Network streaming service.

== Rugby union ==
Rugby union in Saudi Arabia is a minor but growing sport, which has been played for several decades in the Kingdom. Many of the local rugby clubs date back to the late 1970s.

== National teams ==
This is a list of Saudi Arabian national sports teams:

- Saudi Arabia national football team
- Saudi Arabia national basketball team
- Saudi Arabia men's national handball team
- Saudi Arabia national cricket team

== Sports journalism ==
Al Riyada was the first sports newspaper in Saudi Arabia founded by Muhammad Abdullah Malibari.

== See also ==
- Saudi Arabia at the Olympics
- Saudi Arabia at the Paralympics
- Saudi Arabia Football Federation
- Women's sport in Saudi Arabia
- List of sports venues in Saudi Arabia
