= 2025 Miami ePrix =

Race 5 of 16 of the 2024–25 Formula E season
← Previous race	Next race →
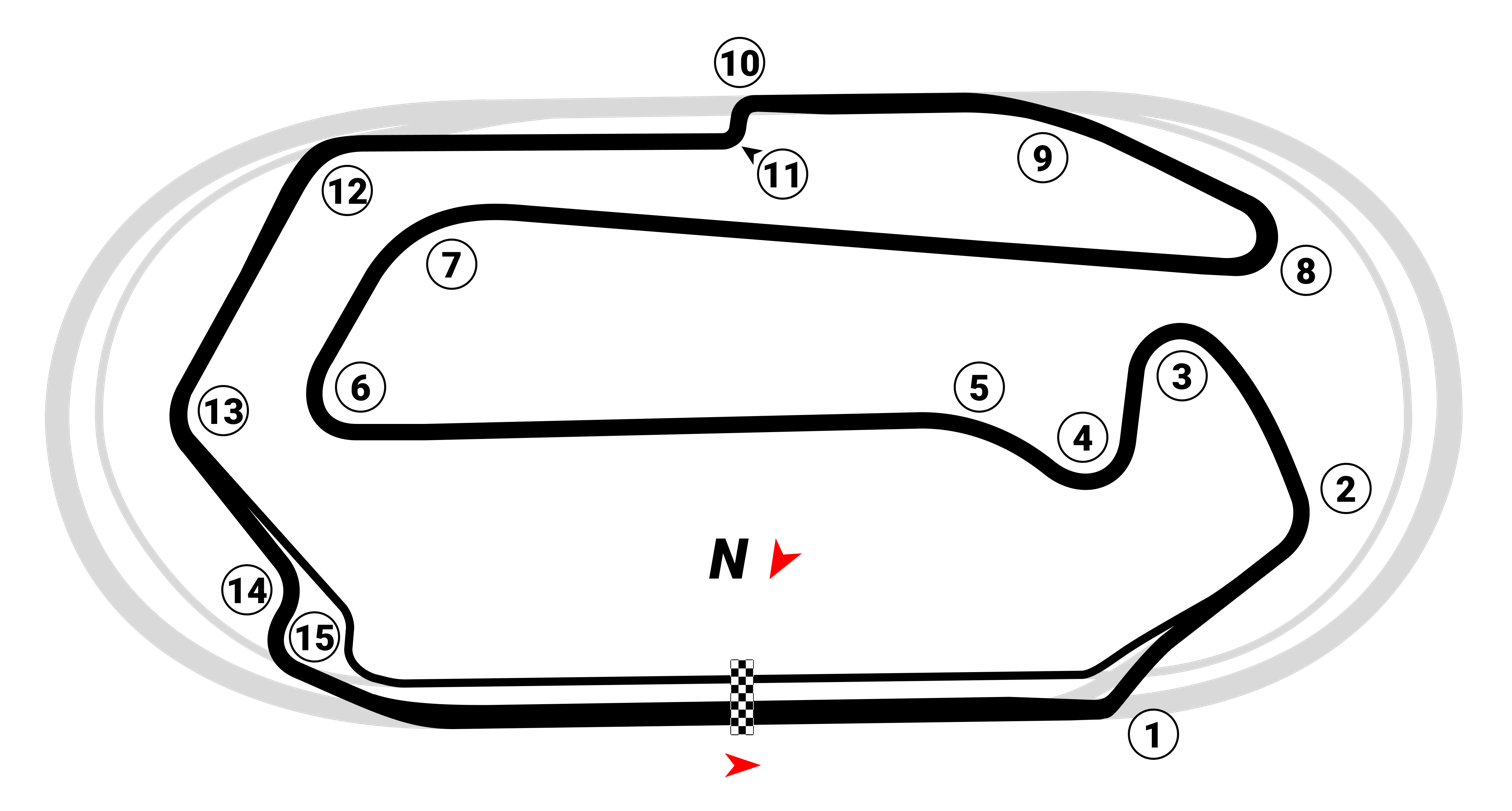

Race details
- Date: April 12, 2025
- Official name: 2025 ABB FIA Formula E Miami E-Prix
- Location: Homestead–Miami Speedway, Homestead, Florida, United States
- Course: Permanent racing facility
- Course length: 3.551 km (2.206 mi)
- Distance: 26 laps, 92.326 km (57.369 mi)

Pole position
Driver	(France) Norman Nato	Nissan
- Time: 1:23.037

Fastest lap
Driver	(Germany) Pascal Wehrlein	Porsche
- Time: 1:25.821 on lap 25

Podium
First	(Germany) Pascal Wehrlein	Porsche
Second	(Brazil) Lucas di Grassi	Lola Yamaha ABT
Third	(Portugal) António Félix da Costa	Porsche

The 2025 Miami ePrix, formally the 2025 ABB FIA Formula E Miami E-Prix, was a Formula E motor race held on April 12, 2025 at the Homestead–Miami Speedway, Homestead, Florida, United States. It served as the fifth championship race of the 2024–25 Formula E season and the second edition of the Miami ePrix after the 2015 Miami ePrix held on the Biscayne Bay Street Circuit a decade prior.

== Background ==
Oliver Rowland led the championship with 68 points. Taylor Barnard and António Félix da Costa were second and third respectively, with 17 and 29 points behind respectively.

== Classification ==
(All times are in EDT).

=== Qualifying ===
Qualifying took place at 9:40 AM on 12 April.

Group draw
Group A	(United Kingdom) ROW	(Portugal) DAC	(United Kingdom) HUG	(New Zealand) EVA	(United Kingdom) DEN	(Switzerland) MOR	(Belgium) VAN	(Switzerland) BUE	(Switzerland) MUE	(Barbados) MAL	(Germany) BEC
Group B	(United Kingdom) BAR	(Germany) GUE	(France) JEV	(Germany) WEH	(Netherlands) DEV	(United Kingdom) BIR	(New Zealand) CAS	(United Kingdom) TIC	(Netherlands) FRI	(France) NAT	(Brazil) DIG

=== Qualifying duels ===
Quarter-finals
A2	(Belgium) Stoffel Vandoorne
A3	(United Kingdom) Jake Dennis
A1	(Portugal) António Félix da Costa
A4	(Germany) David Beckmann
B2	(Brazil) Lucas Di Grassi
B3	(France) Norman Nato
B1	(Netherlands) Robin Frijns
B4	(Netherlands) Nyck de Vries

Semi-finals
(United Kingdom) Jake Dennis
(Portugal) António Félix da Costa
(France) Norman Nato
(Netherlands) Robin Frijns

Final
(United Kingdom) Jake Dennis
(France) Norman Nato

=== Overall classification ===
Pos.	No.	Driver	Team	A	B	QF	SF	F	Grid
1	17	(France) Norman Nato	Nissan	—N/a	1:24:808	1:23:030	1:23:094	1:23:037	1
2	27	(United Kingdom) Jake Dennis	Andretti-Porsche	1:24:901	—N/a	1:23:000	1:23:197	1:23:166	2
3	13	(Portugal) António Félix da Costa	Porsche	1:24:796	—N/a	1:23:229	1:23:218	—N/a	3
4	4	(Netherlands) Robin Frijns	Envision-Jaguar	—N/a	1:24:756	1:23:120	1:23:389	—N/a	4
5	21	(Netherlands) Nyck de Vries	Mahindra	—N/a	1:24:832	1:23:252	—N/a	—N/a	5
6	2	(Belgium) Stoffel Vandoorne	Maserati	1:24:836	—N/a	1:23:566	—N/a	—N/a	6
7	11	(Brazil) Lucas Di Grassi	Lola Yamaha ABT	—N/a	1:24:799	1:23:743	—N/a	—N/a	7
8	3	(Germany) David Beckmann	Cupra Kiro-Porsche	1:24:935	—N/a	1:24:479	—N/a	—N/a	8
9	1	(Germany) Pascal Wehrlein	Porsche	—N/a	1:24:859	—N/a	—N/a	—N/a	9
10	48	(Switzerland) Edoardo Mortara	Mahindra	1:24:959	—N/a	—N/a	—N/a	—N/a	10
11	5	(United Kingdom) Taylor Barnard	Mclaren-Nissan	—N/a	1:24:879	—N/a	—N/a	—N/a	11
12	16	(Switzerland) Sébastian Buemi	Envision-Jaguar	1:24:989	—N/a	—N/a	—N/a	—N/a	12
13	37	(New Zealand) Nick Cassidy	Jaguar	—N/a	1:25:073	—N/a	—N/a	—N/a	13
14	9	(New Zealand) Mitch Evans	Jaguar	1:25:047	—N/a	—N/a	—N/a	—N/a	14
15	33	(United Kingdom) Dan Ticktum	Cupra Kiro-Porsche	—N/a	1:25:075	—N/a	—N/a	—N/a	15
16	23	(United Kingdom) Oliver Rowland	Nissan	1:25:061	—N/a	—N/a	—N/a	—N/a	16
17	25	(France) Jean-Eric Vergne	DS Penske	—N/a	1:25:136	—N/a	—N/a	—N/a	17
18	51	(Switzerland) Nico Müller	Andretti-Porsche	1:25:203	—N/a	—N/a	—N/a	—N/a	18
19	8	(United Kingdom) Sam Bird	McLaren-Nissan	—N/a	1:25:328	—N/a	—N/a	—N/a	19
20	22	(Barbados) Zane Maloney	Lola Yamaha ABT	1:25:250	—N/a	—N/a	—N/a	—N/a	20
21	7	(Germany) Maximilian Günther	DS Penske	—N/a	1:25:552	—N/a	—N/a	—N/a	22 (Note: Günther was given a 5-place grid penalty for causing a collision with António Félix da Costa during the race 2 of the Jeddah ePrix.)
22	55	(United Kingdom) Jake Hughes	Maserati	1:25:359	—N/a	—N/a	—N/a	—N/a	21

=== Race ===
Race started at 2:05 PM on 12 April.

Some teams deliberately wanted to wait until four laps remaining to use their Attack Mode so they could have the most possible time with extra power late in the race; however, a late-race safety car, red flag, and no added laps from the safety car made it impossible for teams to use the Attack Mode until it was too late.

Pos.	No.	Driver	Team	Laps	Time/Retired	Grid	Points
1	1	(Germany) Pascal Wehrlein	Porsche	26	1:04:19.723	9	25+1^{2}
2	11	(Brazil) Lucas Di Grassi	Lola Yamaha ABT	26	+5.619	7	18
3	13	(Portugal) António Félix da Costa	Porsche	26	+6.084	3	15
4	51	(Switzerland) Nico Müller	Andretti-Porsche	26	+8.447	18	12
5	48	(Switzerland) Edoardo Mortara	Mahindra	26	+9.070	10	10
6	17	(France) Norman Nato	Nissan	26	+9.881 (Note: Nato was given a 10-second time penalty for not using the total amount of time of his attack mode during the race.)	1	8+3^{1}
7	33	(United Kingdom) Dan Ticktum	Cupra Kiro-Porsche	26	+10.033	15	6
8	4	(Netherlands) Robin Frijns	Envision	26	+10.142 (Note: Frijns was given a 10-second time penalty for not using the total amount of time of his attack mode during the race.)	4	4
9	27	(United Kingdom) Jake Dennis	Andretti-Porsche	26	+10.329	2	2
10	23	(United Kingdom) Oliver Rowland	Nissan	26	+10.925 (Note: Rowland was given a 10-second time penalty for not using the total amount of time of his attack mode during the race.)	16	1
11	21	(Netherlands) Nyck De Vries	Mahindra	26	+11.324	5	
12	25	(France) Jean-Eric Vergne	DS Penske	26	+11.496	17	
13	16	(Switzerland) Sebastien Buemi	Envision	26	+11.868	12	
14	2	(Belgium) Stoffel Vandoorne	Maserati	26	+12.159	6	
15	37	(New Zealand) Nick Cassidy	Jaguar	26	+12.326	13	
16	9	(New Zealand) Mitch Evans	Jaguar	26	+12.704	14	
17	7	(Germany) Maximilian Günther	DS Penske	26	+13.592	22	
18	8	(United Kingdom) Sam Bird	McLaren-Nissan	26	+13.780 (Note: Bird was given a 10-second time penalty for not using the total amount of time of his attack mode during the race.)	19	
19	22	(Barbados) Zane Maloney	Lola Yamaha ABT	26	+15.799 (Note: Maloney was given a 5-second time penalty for leaving the track and gaining an advantage.)	20	
20	5	(United Kingdom) Taylor Barnard	McLaren-Nissan	26	+17.729 (Note: Barnard was given a 10-second time penalty for not using the total amount of time of his attack mode during the race.)	11	
NC	3	(Germany) David Beckmann	Cupra Kiro-Porsche	21	+5 laps	8	
DNF	55	(United Kingdom) Jake Hughes	Maserati	19	Accident	21	

Notes:

- ^1 – Pole position.
- ^2 – Fastest lap.

=== Standings after the race ===
Drivers' Championship standings

	Pos	Driver	Points
	1	(United Kingdom) Oliver Rowland	69
1	2	(Portugal) António Félix da Costa	54
5	3	(Germany) Pascal Wehrlein	51
2	4	(United Kingdom) Taylor Barnard	51
1	5	(Germany) Maximilian Günther	37

Teams' Championship standings

	Pos	Team	Points
2	1	(Germany) Porsche	105
1	2	(Japan) Nissan	80
1	3	(United Kingdom) McLaren	67
	4	(United States) DS Penske	63
1	5	(India) Mahindra	51

Manufacturers' Championship standings

	Pos	Manufacturer	Points
	1	(Japan) Nissan	146
1	2	(Germany) Porsche	120
1	3	(Netherlands) Stellantis	85
1	4	(India) Mahindra	68
1	5	(United Kingdom) Jaguar	67

- Notes: Only the top five positions are included for all three sets of standings.

== Notes ==
Previous race: 2025 Jeddah ePrix	FIA Formula E World Championship; 2024–25 season	Next race: 2025 Monaco ePrix
Previous race: 2015 Miami ePrix	Miami ePrix	Next race: 2026 Miami ePrix
