= 2025 Mexico City ePrix =

Race 2 of 16 of the 2024–25 Formula E season
← Previous race	Next race →
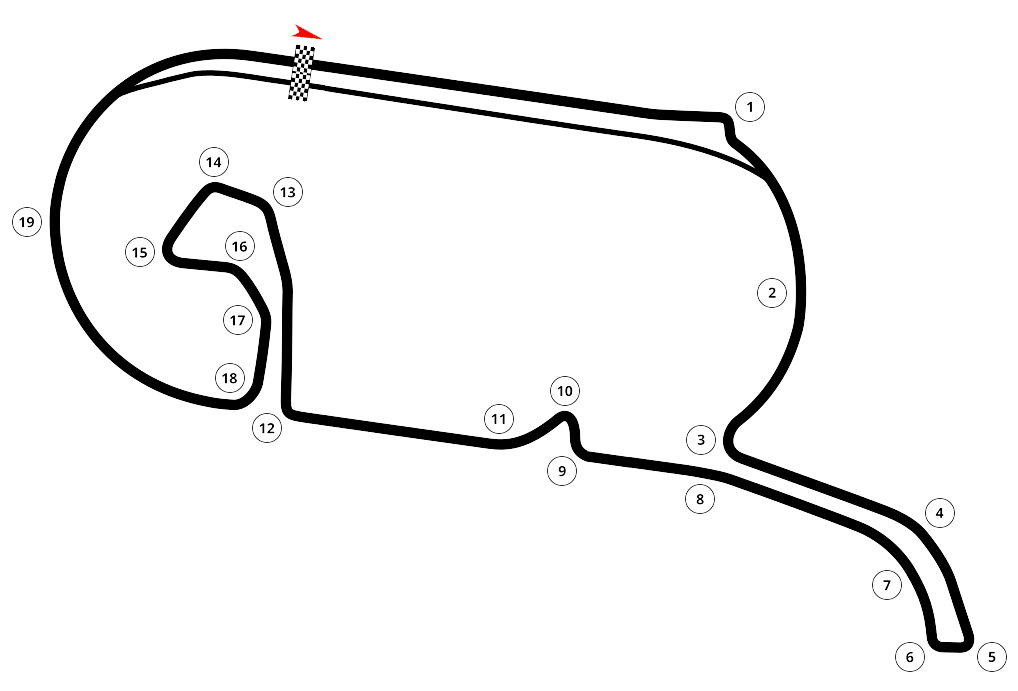

Race details
- Date: 11 January 2025
- Official name: 2025 Hankook Mexico City E-Prix
- Location: Autódromo Hermanos Rodríguez, Mexico City
- Course: Permanent racing facility
- Course length: 2.628 km (1.633 mi)
- Scheduled distance: 36 laps, 94.608 km (58.787 mi)

Pole position
Driver	(Germany) Pascal Wehrlein	Porsche
- Time: 1:10.984

Fastest lap
Driver	(Switzerland) Sébastien Buemi	Envision Racing
- Time: 1:12.547

Podium
First	(United Kingdom) Oliver Rowland	Nissan
Second	(Portugal) António Félix da Costa	Porsche
Third	(Germany) Pascal Wehrlein	Porsche

The 2025 Mexico City ePrix, known for sponsorship reasons as the 2025 Hankook Mexico City E-Prix was a Formula E electric car race held at the Autódromo Hermanos Rodríguez in Mexico City on 11 January 2025. It was the second round of the 2024–25 Formula E season and the ninth edition of the event.

Oliver Rowland won the race, with António Félix da Costa and Pascal Wehrlein completing the podium.

== Background ==
Following a win starting from the last place in the first round in São Paulo, Mitch Evans led the championship with 25 points. António Félix da Costa was second, 6 points behind, and Taylor Barnard was third, 10 points behind.

== Classification ==
(All times in CST)

=== Qualification ===
Qualifying took place at 9:40 AM on 11 January.

Group draw
Group A	(New Zealand) EVA	(United Kingdom) BAR	(Switzerland) MOR	(Switzerland) BUE	(Germany) WEH	(Belgium) VAN	(Barbados) MAL	(United Kingdom) ROW	(New Zealand) CAS	(Switzerland) MUE	(Brazil) DIG
Group B	(Portugal) DAC	(United Kingdom) BIR	(Netherlands) DEV	(United Kingdom) TIC	(France) JEV	(Germany) GUE	(France) NAT	(Germany) BEC	(United Kingdom) DEN	(United Kingdom) HUG	(Netherlands) FRI

==== Qualifying duels ====
Quarter-finals
A2	(New Zealand) Mitch Evans
A3	(United Kingdom) Oliver Rowland
A1	(Switzerland) Edoardo Mortara
A4	(Germany) Pascal Wehrlein
B2	(Portugal) António Félix da Costa
B3	(United Kingdom) Jake Dennis
B1	(France) Jean-Éric Vergne
B4	(Germany) Maximilian Günther

Semi-finals
(United Kingdom) Oliver Rowland
(Germany) Pascal Wehrlein
(Portugal) António Félix da Costa
(France) Jean-Éric Vergne

Final
(Germany) Pascal Wehrlein
(Portugal) António Félix da Costa

==== Overall classification ====
Pos.	No.	Driver	Team	A	B	QF	SF	F	Grid
1	1	(Germany) Pascal Wehrlein	Porsche	1:14:610	—N/a	1:11.691	1:11.040	1:10.984	1
2	13	(Portugal) António Félix da Costa	Porsche	—N/a	1:13:491	1:11:252	1:10:739	1:11:109	2
3	25	(France) Jean-Éric Vergne	DS Penske	—N/a	1:13:528	1:11.190	1:10.923	—N/a	3
4	23	(United Kingdom) Oliver Rowland	Nissan	1:14:657	—N/a	1:11.058	1:11:222	—N/a	4
5	9	(New Zealand) Mitch Evans	Jaguar	1:14:891	—N/a	1:11:338	—N/a	—N/a	5
6	7	(Germany) Maximilian Günther	DS Penske	—N/a	1:13:352	1:11:532	—N/a	—N/a	6
7	27	(United Kingdom) Jake Dennis	Andretti-Porsche	—N/a	1:13:423	1:11.740	—N/a	—N/a	7
8	48	(Switzerland) Edoardo Mortara	Mahindra	1:15:115	—N/a	1:12.592	—N/a	—N/a	8
9	22	(Barbados) Zane Maloney	Lola Yamaha ABT	1:15.436	—N/a	—N/a	—N/a	—N/a	9
10	8	(United Kingdom) Sam Bird	McLaren-Nissan	—N/a	1:13.733	—N/a	—N/a	—N/a	10
11	51	(Switzerland) Nico Müller	Andretti-Porsche	1:15.605	—N/a	—N/a	—N/a	—N/a	11
12	21	(Netherlands) Nyck de Vries	Mahindra	—N/a	1:14.061	—N/a	—N/a	—N/a	12
13	3	(Germany) David Beckmann	Cupra Kiro-Porsche	1:16:040	—N/a	—N/a	—N/a	—N/a	13
14	55	(United Kingdom) Jake Hughes	Maserati	—N/a	1:14.134	—N/a	—N/a	—N/a	14
15	2	(Belgium) Stoffel Vandoorne	Maserati	1:16.240	—N/a	—N/a	—N/a	—N/a	15
16	33	(United Kingdom) Dan Ticktum	Cupra Kiro-Porsche	—N/a	1:14:288	—N/a	—N/a	—N/a	16
17	11	(Brazil) Lucas Di Grassi	Lola Yamaha ABT	1:18:051	—N/a	—N/a	—N/a	—N/a	17
18	17	(France) Norman Nato	Nissan	—N/a	1:14:389	—N/a	—N/a	—N/a	18
19	5	(United Kingdom) Taylor Barnard	McLaren-Nissan	1:19.191	—N/a	—N/a	—N/a	—N/a	19
20	4	(Netherlands) Robin Frijns	Envision-Jaguar	—N/a	1:20.488	—N/a	—N/a	—N/a	20
21	16	(Switzerland) Sébastien Buemi	Envision-Jaguar	1:22:854	—N/a	—N/a	—N/a	—N/a	21
22	37	(New Zealand) Nick Cassidy	Jaguar	—N/a	1:20:644	—N/a	—N/a	—N/a	22

=== Race ===
The race started at 2:05 PM on 11 January.

Pos.	No.	Driver	Team	Laps	Time/Retired	Grid	Points
1	23	(United Kingdom) Oliver Rowland	Nissan	36	48:20:764	4	25
2	13	(Portugal) António Félix da Costa	Porsche	35	+0.400	2	18
3	1	(Germany) Pascal Wehrlein	Porsche	36	+1.855	1	15+3^{1}
4	27	(United Kingdom) Jake Dennis	Andretti-Porsche	36	+2.000	7	12+1^{2}
5	25	(France) Jean-Éric Vergne	DS Penske	36	+2.965	3	10
6	7	(Germany) Maximilian Günther	DS Penske	36	+3.507	6	8
7	2	(Belgium) Stoffel Vandoorne	Maserati	36	+4.491	13	6
8	21	(Netherlands) Nyck de Vries	Mahindra	36	+5.164	14	4
9	51	(Switzerland) Nico Müller	Andretti-Porsche	36	+6.070	11	2
10	55	(United Kingdom) Jake Hughes	Maserati	36	+8.564	16	1
11	4	(Netherlands) Robin Frijns	Envision-Jaguar	36	+9.305	20	
12	37	(New Zealand) Nick Cassidy	Jaguar	36	+10.821	22	
13	17	(France) Norman Nato	Nissan	36	+11.073	18	
14	5	(United Kingdom) Taylor Barnard	McLaren-Nissan	35	+12.234 (Note: Barnard was given a 5-second time penalty for leaving the track and gaining an advantage.)	19	
15	22	(Barbados) Zane Maloney	Lola Yamaha ABT	36	+15.277	9	
16	33	(United Kingdom) Dan Ticktum	Cupra Kiro-Porsche	36	+15.693	15	
17	16	(Switzerland) Sébastien Buemi	Envision-Jaguar	36	+19.806 (Note: Buemi was given a 10-second time penalty for not using the total amount of time of his attack mode during the race.)	21	
18	8	(United Kingdom) Sam Bird	McLaren-Nissan	36	+21.329 (Note: Bird was given a 5-second time penalty for causing a collision with Mortara.)	10	
19	48	(Switzerland) Edoardo Mortara	Mahindra	36	+24.044 (Note: Mortara was given a 10-second time penalty for not using the total amount of time of his attack mode during the race.)	8	
20	11	(Brazil) Lucas Di Grassi	Lola Yamaha ABT	36	+39.841 (Note: Di Grassi was given a 27-second time penalty for activating attack mode only once during the race.)	17	
DNF	9	(New Zealand) Mitch Evans	Jaguar	30	Collision with Muller	5	
DNF	3	(Germany) David Beckmann	Cupra Kiro-Porsche	27	Collision	12	

Notes:

- ^1 – Pole position.
- ^2 – Fastest lap.

=== Standings after the race ===
Drivers' Championship standings

	Pos	Driver	Points
1	1	(Portugal) António Félix da Costa	37
13	2	(United Kingdom) Oliver Rowland	25
1	3	(New Zealand) Mitch Evans	25
5	4	(Germany) Pascal Wehrlein	21
2	5	(United Kingdom) Taylor Barnard	15

Teams' Championship standings

	Pos	Team	Points
2	1	(Germany) Porsche	58
1	2	(United Kingdom) McLaren	27
1	3	(United Kingdom) Jaguar	25
6	4	(Japan) Nissan	25
1	5	(India) Mahindra	22

Manufacturers' Championship standings

	Pos	Manufacturer	Points
2	1	(Germany) Porsche	55
	2	(Japan) Nissan	54
2	3	(United Kingdom) Jaguar	41
	4	(India) Mahindra	26
	5	(Netherlands) Stellantis	25

- Notes: Only the top five positions are included for all three sets of standings.

== Notes ==
Previous race: 2024 São Paulo ePrix (December)	FIA Formula E World Championship; 2024–25 season	Next race: 2025 Jeddah ePrix
Previous race: 2024 Mexico City ePrix	Mexico City ePrix	Next race: 2026 Mexico City ePrix
