= 2025 Jeddah ePrix =

Race 3 of 16 of the 2024–25 Formula E season
| ← Previous race | Next race → |
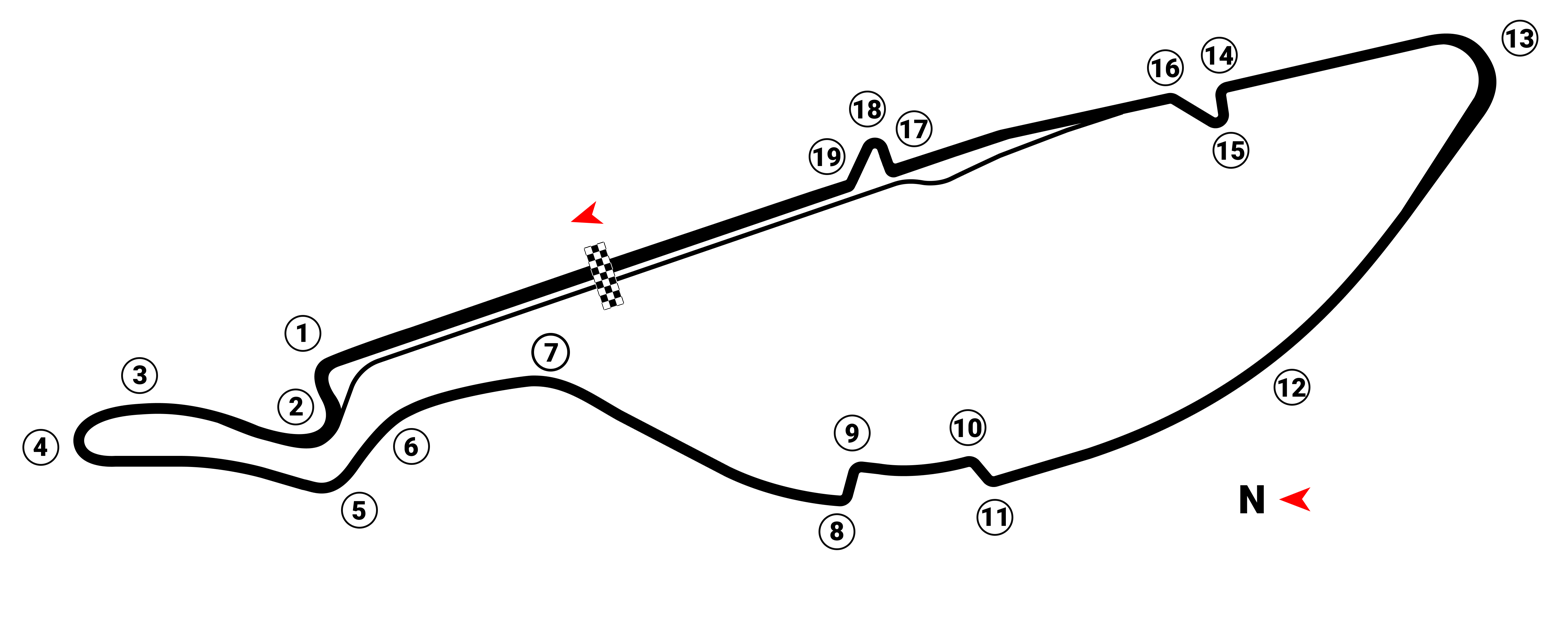

Race details
- Date: 14 February 2025
- Official name: 2025 Jeddah E-Prix
- Location: Jeddah Corniche Circuit, Jeddah, Saudi Arabia
- Course: Street circuit
- Course length: 3.001 km (1.865 mi)
- Distance: 31 laps, 93.003 km (57.789 mi)

Pole position
| Driver | (Germany) Maximilian Günther | DS Penske |
- Time: 1:14.911

Fastest lap
| Driver | (Germany) Maximilian Günther | DS Penske |
- Time: 1:17.179 on lap 27

Podium
| First | (Germany) Maximilian Günther | DS Penske |
| Second | (United Kingdom) Oliver Rowland | Nissan |
| Third | (United Kingdom) Taylor Barnard | McLaren-Nissan |

2025 Jeddah ePrix
Race 4 of 16 of the 2024–25 Formula E season
| ← Previous race | Next race → |
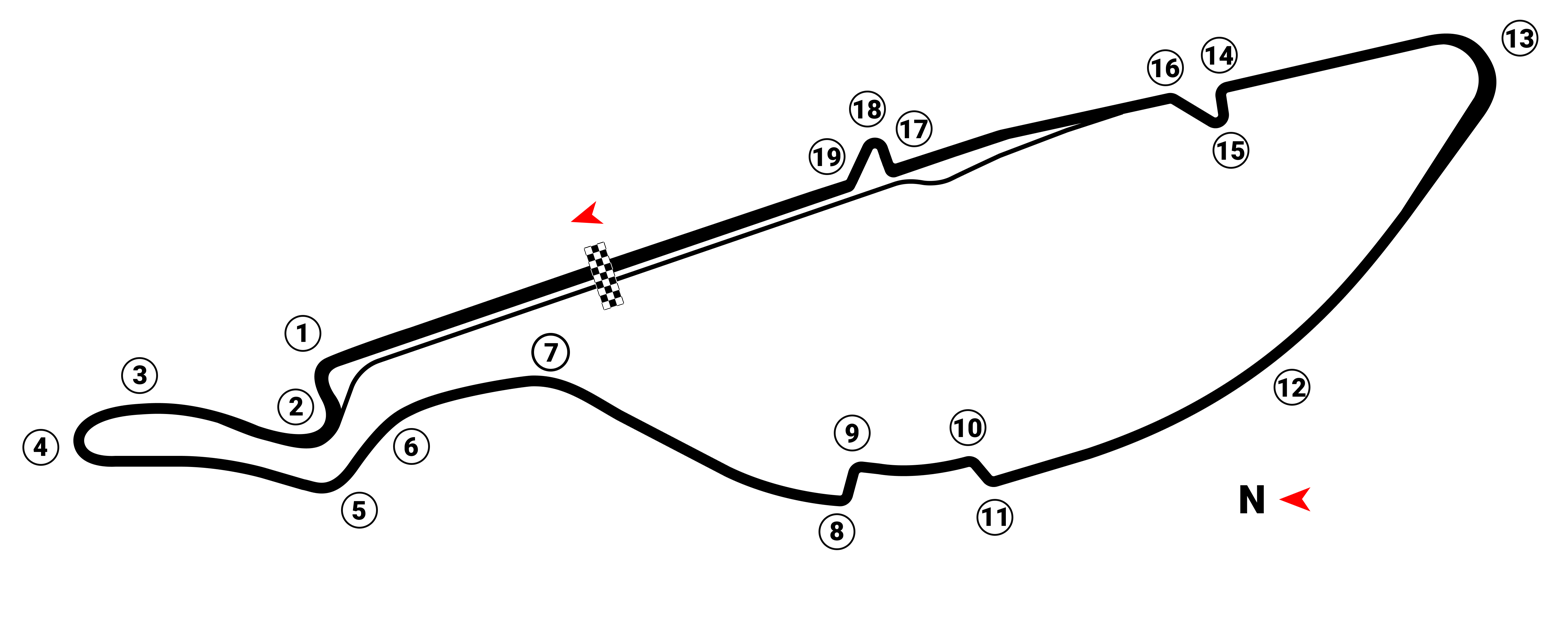

Race details
- Date: 15 February 2025
- Official name: 2025 Jeddah E-Prix
- Location: Jeddah Corniche Circuit, Jeddah, Saudi Arabia
- Course: Street circuit
- Course length: 3.001 km (1.865 mi)
- Distance: 31 laps, 93.003 km (57.789 mi)

Pole position
| Driver | (United Kingdom) Taylor Barnard | McLaren-Nissan |
- Time: 1:14.804

Fastest lap
| Driver | (United Kingdom) Sam Bird | McLaren-Nissan |
- Time: 1:17.521 on lap 30

Podium
| First | (United Kingdom) Oliver Rowland | Nissan |
| Second | (United Kingdom) Taylor Barnard | McLaren-Nissan |
| Third | (United Kingdom) Jake Hughes | Maserati MSG Racing |

The 2025 Jeddah ePrix was a pair of Formula E electric car races at the Jeddah Corniche Circuit in the town of Jeddah, in Saudi Arabia on the 14 and 15 February 2025. It served as the third and fourth round of the 2024–25 Formula E season, the first edition of the Jeddah ePrix and the seventh time the event was held in Saudi Arabia, replacing the Diriyah ePrix.

The first race was won by Maximilian Günther, with Oliver Rowland and Taylor Barnard rounding out the podium. Oliver Rowland won the second race, ahead of Taylor Barnard and Jake Hughes to make up an all-British podium.

== Background ==
The new quick-charging feature known as Pit Boost was introduced in the first race of the Jeddah ePrix.

António Félix da Costa led the championship with 37 points. Oliver Rowland and Mitch Evans were second and third respectively, tied with 12 points behind.

== Classification ==
(All times are in AST).

=== Race 1 ===
==== Qualifying ====
Qualifying for race 1 took place at 3:20 PM on 14 February.

Group draw
| Group A | (Portugal) DAC | (New Zealand) EVA | (United Kingdom) BAR | (United Kingdom) BIR | (Netherlands) DEV | (Germany) GUE | (Switzerland) BUE | (Switzerland) MUE | (Netherlands) FRI | (New Zealand) CAS | (Brazil) DIG |
| Group B | (United Kingdom) ROW | (Germany) WEH | (United Kingdom) DEN | (France) JEV | (Switzerland) MOR | (Belgium) VAN | (United Kingdom) TIC | (United Kingdom) HUG | (Barbados) MAL | (France) NAT | (Germany) BEC |

==== Qualifying duels ====
Quarter-finals
A2 | (Germany) Maximilian Günther
A3 | (Netherlands) Nyck de Vries
A1 | (United Kingdom) Taylor Barnard
A4 | (New Zealand) Mitch Evans
B2 | (Germany) Pascal Wehrlein
B3 | (United Kingdom) Jake Hughes
B1 | (United Kingdom) Oliver Rowland
B4 | (United Kingdom) Dan Ticktum

Semi-finals
(Germany) Maximilian Günther
(United Kingdom) Taylor Barnard
(Germany) Pascal Wehrlein
(United Kingdom) Oliver Rowland

Final
(Germany) Maximilian Günther
(Germany) Pascal Wehrlein

==== Overall classification ====
| Pos. | No. | Driver | Team | A | B | QF | SF | F | Grid |
|---|---|---|---|---|---|---|---|---|---|
| 1 | 7 | (Germany) Maximilian Günther | DS Penske | 1:17:491 | —N/a | 1:15:472 | 1:15:219 | 1:14:911 | 1 |
| 2 | 1 | (Germany) Pascal Wehrlein | Porsche | —N/a | 1:17:494 | 1:15:380 | 1:14:999 | 1:15:197 | 2 |
| 3 | 23 | (United Kingdom) Oliver Rowland | Nissan | —N/a | 1:17:182 | 1:15:371 | 1:15.058 | —N/a | 3 |
| 4 | 5 | (United Kingdom) Taylor Barnard | Mclaren-Nissan | 1:17:429 | —N/a | 1:15:560 | 1:15:396 | —N/a | 4 |
| 5 | 9 | (New Zealand) Mitch Evans | Jaguar | 1:17:507 | —N/a | 1:15:574 | —N/a | —N/a | 5 |
| 6 | 21 | (Netherlands) Nyck de Vries | Mahindra | 1:17:492 | —N/a | 1:16:216 | —N/a | —N/a | 6 |
| 7 | 55 | (United Kingdom) Jake Hughes | Maserati | —N/a | 1:17:456 | 1:16:216 | —N/a | —N/a | 7 |
| 8 | 33 | (United Kingdom) Dan Ticktum | Cupra Kiro-Porsche | —N/a | 1:17:506 | 1:17:506 | —N/a | —N/a | 8 |
| 9 | 37 | (New Zealand) Nick Cassidy | Jaguar | 1:17:663 | —N/a | —N/a | —N/a | —N/a | 9 |
| 10 | 25 | (France) Jean-Eric Vergne | DS Penske | —N/a | 1:17:459 | —N/a | —N/a | —N/a | 10 |
| 11 | 8 | (United Kingdom) Sam Bird | McLaren-Nissan | 1:17:751 | —N/a | —N/a | —N/a | —N/a | 11 |
| 12 | 17 | (France) Norman Nato | Nissan | —N/a | 1:17:670 | —N/a | —N/a | —N/a | 12 |
| 13 | 13 | (Portugal) António Félix da Costa | Porsche | 1:17:774 | —N/a | —N/a | —N/a | —N/a | 13 |
| 14 | 2 | (Belgium) Stoffel Vandoorne | Maserati | —N/a | 1:17:736 | —N/a | —N/a | —N/a | 14 |
| 15 | 51 | (Switzerland) Nico Müller | Andretti-Porsche | 1:17:855 | —N/a | —N/a | —N/a | —N/a | 15 |
| 16 | 27 | (United Kingdom) Jake Dennis | Andretti-Porsche | —N/a | 1:17:775 | —N/a | —N/a | —N/a | 16 |
| 17 | 16 | (Switzerland) Sébastian Buemi | Envision-Jaguar | 1:17:993 | —N/a | —N/a | —N/a | —N/a | 17 |
| 18 | 3 | (Germany) David Beckmann | Cupra Kiro-Porsche | —N/a | 1:17:801 | —N/a | —N/a | —N/a | 18 |
| 19 | 11 | (Brazil) Lucas Di Grassi | Lola Yamaha ABT | 1:18:351 | —N/a | —N/a | —N/a | —N/a | 19 |
| 20 | 22 | (Barbados) Zane Maloney | Lola Yamaha ABT | —N/a | 1:17:998 | —N/a | —N/a | —N/a | 20 |
| 21 | 4 | (Netherlands) Robin Frijns | Envision-Jaguar | 1:18:404 | —N/a | —N/a | —N/a | —N/a | 21 |
| 22 | 48 | (Switzerland) Edoardo Mortara | Mahindra | —N/a | —N/a | —N/a | —N/a | —N/a | 22 |

==== Race ====
Race 1 started at 8:05 PM on 14 February.

| Pos. | No. | Driver | Team | Laps | Time/Retired | Grid | Points |
|---|---|---|---|---|---|---|---|
| 1 | 7 | (Germany) Maximilian Günther | DS Penske | 31 | 43:35.339 | 1 | 25+3+1^{1} ^{2} |
| 2 | 23 | (United Kingdom) Oliver Rowland | Nissan | 31 | +0.864 | 3 | 18 |
| 3 | 5 | (United Kingdom) Taylor Barnard | McLaren-Nissan | 31 | +1.153 | 4 | 15 |
| 4 | 21 | (Netherlands) Nyck De Vries | Mahindra | 31 | +1.448 | 6 | 12 |
| 5 | 55 | (United Kingdom) Jake Hughes | Maserati | 31 | +9.814 | 7 | 10 |
| 6 | 25 | (France) Jean-Eric Vergne | DS Penske | 31 | +10.172 | 10 | 8 |
| 7 | 48 | (Switzerland) Edoardo Mortara | Mahindra | 31 | +11.312 | 22 | 6 |
| 8 | 8 | (United Kingdom) Sam Bird | McLaren-Nissan | 31 | +11.751 | 11 | 4 |
| 9 | 13 | (Portugal) António Félix da Costa | Porsche | 31 | +12.332 | 13 | 2 |
| 10 | 2 | (Belgium) Stoffel Vandoorne | Maserati | 31 | +13.141 | 14 | 1 |
| 11 | 37 | (New Zealand) Nick Cassidy | Jaguar | 31 | +14.625 | 9 | |
| 12 | 16 | (Switzerland) Sebastien Buemi | Envision | 31 | +16.807 | 17 | |
| 13 | 4 | (Netherlands) Robin Frijns | Envision | 31 | +17.768 | 19 | |
| 14 | 3 | (Germany) David Beckmann | Cupra Kiro-Porsche | 31 | +20.710 | 18 | |
| 15 | 1 | (Germany) Pascal Wehrlein | Porsche | 31 | +32.522 | 2 | |
| 16 | 22 | (Barbados) Zane Maloney | Lola Yamaha ABT | 31 | +42.713 | 20 | |
| 17 | 17 | (France) Norman Nato | Nissan | 31 | +49.012 | 12 | |
| 18 | 33 | (United Kingdom) Dan Ticktum | Cupra Kiro-Porsche | 31 | +1:14.128 (Note: Ticktum was given a 25-second time penalty (converted from a drive-through penalty) due to mechanics working on the car although it was in a "ready to move" status.) | 8 | |
| 19 | 9 | (New Zealand) Mitch Evans | Jaguar | 30 | +1 Lap | 5 | |
| DNF | 27 | (United Kingdom) Jake Dennis | Andretti-Porsche | 30 | | 21 | |
| DNF | 51 | (Switzerland) Nico Müller | Andretti-Porsche | 0 | Collision damage | 16 | |
| DSQ (Note: Di Grassi was disqualified due to energy overusage.) | 11 | (Brazil) Lucas Di Grassi | Lola Yamaha ABT | 31 | | 15 | |

Notes:

- ^1 – Pole position.
- ^2 – Fastest lap.

==== Standings after the race ====
Drivers' Championship standings

| | Pos | Driver | Points |
|---|---|---|---|
| 1 | 1 | (United Kingdom) Oliver Rowland | 43 |
| 1 | 2 | (Portugal) António Félix da Costa | 39 |
| 8 | 3 | (Germany) Maximilian Günther | 37 |
| 1 | 4 | (United Kingdom) Taylor Barnard | 30 |
| 2 | 5 | (New Zealand) Mitch Evans | 25 |

Teams' Championship standings

| | Pos | Team | Points |
|---|---|---|---|
| | 1 | (Germany) Porsche | 60 |
| 4 | 2 | (United States) DS Penske | 57 |
| 1 | 3 | (United Kingdom) McLaren | 46 |
| | 4 | (Japan) Nissan | 43 |
| | 5 | (India) Mahindra | 40 |

Manufacturers' Championship standings

| | Pos | Manufacturer | Points |
|---|---|---|---|
| 1 | 1 | (Japan) Nissan | 87 |
| 1 | 2 | (Germany) Porsche | 62 |
| 2 | 3 | (Netherlands) Stellantis | 60 |
| 1 | 4 | (United Kingdom) Jaguar | 47 |
| 1 | 5 | (India) Mahindra | 46 |

- Notes: Only the top five positions are included for all three sets of standings.

=== Race 2 ===
==== Qualifying ====
Qualifying for race 2 took place at 3:20 PM on 15 February.

Group draw
| Group A | (United Kingdom) ROW | (Germany) GUE | (New Zealand) EVA | (Germany) WEH | (United Kingdom) BIR | (United Kingdom) DEN | (Belgium) VAN | (United Kingdom) TIC | (New Zealand) CAS | (Barbados) MAL | (Germany) BEC |
| Group B | (Portugal) DAC | (United Kingdom) BAR | (Netherlands) DEV | (France) JEV | (Switzerland) MOR | (United Kingdom) HUG | (Switzerland) BUE | (Switzerland) MUE | (Netherlands) FRI | (France) NAT | (Brazil) DIG |

==== Qualifying duels ====
Quarter-finals
A2 | (United Kingdom) Oliver Rowland
A3 | (Germany) Maximilian Günther
A1 | (United Kingdom) Sam Bird
A4 | (Belgium) Stoffel Vandoorne
B2 | (United Kingdom) Jake Hughes
B3 | (Switzerland) Edoardo Mortara
B1 | (United Kingdom) Taylor Barnard
B4 | (Portugal) António Félix da Costa

Semi-finals
(United Kingdom) Oliver Rowland
(Belgium) Stoffel Vandoorne
(United Kingdom) Jake Hughes
(United Kingdom) Taylor Barnard

Final
(United Kingdom) Oliver Rowland
(United Kingdom) Taylor Barnard

==== Overall classification ====
| Pos. | No. | Driver | Team | A | B | QF | SF | F | Grid |
|---|---|---|---|---|---|---|---|---|---|
| 1 | 4 | (United Kingdom) Taylor Barnard | McLaren-Nissan | —N/a | 1:16:922 | 1:14:840 | 1:15:029 | 1:14:804 | 1 |
| 2 | 23 | (United Kingdom) Oliver Rowland | Nissan | 1:17:115 | —N/a | 1:15:122 | 1:15:071 | 1:15:243 | 2 |
| 3 | 55 | (United Kingdom) Jake Hughes | Maserati | —N/a | 1:16:990 | 1:15:384 | 1:15:460 | —N/a | 3 |
| 4 | 13 | (Portugal) António Félix da Costa | Porsche | —N/a | 1:17:068 | 1:15:067 | —N/a | —N/a | 4 |
| 5 | 48 | (Switzerland) Edoardo Mortara | Mahindra | —N/a | 1:17:028 | 1:15:392 | —N/a | —N/a | 5 |
| 6 | 7 | (Germany) Maximilian Günther | DS Penske | 1:17:194 | —N/a | 1:15:402 | —N/a | —N/a | 6 |
| 7 | 8 | (United Kingdom) Sam Bird | McLaren-Nissan | 1:17:196 | —N/a | 1:15:418 | —N/a | —N/a | 7 |
| 8 | 21 | (Netherlands) Nyck de Vries | Mahindra | —N/a | 1:17:156 | —N/a | —N/a | —N/a | 8 |
| 9 | 33 | (United Kingdom) Dan Ticktum | Cupra Kiro-Porsche | 1:17:240 | —N/a | —N/a | —N/a | —N/a | 9 |
| 10 | 17 | (France) Norman Nato | Nissan | —N/a | 1:17:189 | —N/a | —N/a | —N/a | 10 |
| 11 | 3 | (Germany) David Beckmann | Cupra Kiro-Porsche | 1:17:267 | —N/a | —N/a | —N/a | —N/a | 11 |
| 12 | 25 | (France) Jean-Eric Vergne | DS Penske | —N/a | 1:17:237 | —N/a | —N/a | —N/a | 12 |
| 13 | 1 | (Germany) Pascal Wehrlein | Porsche | 1:17:298 | —N/a | —N/a | —N/a | —N/a | 13 |
| 14 | 4 | (Netherlands) Robin Frijns | Envision-Jaguar | —N/a | 1:17:482 | —N/a | —N/a | —N/a | 14 |
| 15 | 9 | (New Zealand) Mitch Evans | Jaguar | 1:17:300 | —N/a | —N/a | —N/a | —N/a | 15 |
| 16 | 11 | (Brazil) Lucas di Grassi | Lola Yamaha ABT | —N/a | 1:17:668 | —N/a | —N/a | —N/a | 16 |
| 17 | 37 | (New Zealand) Nick Cassidy | Jaguar | 1:17:479 | —N/a | —N/a | —N/a | —N/a | 17 |
| 18 | 16 | (Switzerland) Sébastian Buemi | Envision-Jaguar | —N/a | 1:17:686 | —N/a | —N/a | —N/a | 18 |
| 19 | 27 | (United Kingdom) Jake Dennis | Andretti-Porsche | 1:17:481 | —N/a | —N/a | —N/a | —N/a | 19 |
| 20 | 51 | (Switzerland) Nico Müller | Andretti-Porsche | —N/a | 1:17:798 | —N/a | —N/a | —N/a | 20 |
| 21 | 22 | (Barbados) Zane Maloney | Lola Yamaha ABT | 1:18:246 | —N/a | —N/a | —N/a | —N/a | 21 |
| 22 | 2 | (Belgium) Stoffel Vandoorne | Maserati | 1:17:020 | —N/a | 1:15:336 | 1:15:247 | —N/a | 22 (Note: Vandoorne originally qualified the 3rd. He was disqualified for not having fire extinguisher armed during the qualifying session and started the race in 22nd place.) |

==== Race ====
Race 2 started at 8:05 PM on 15 February.

| Pos. | No. | Driver | Team | Laps | Time/Retired | Grid | Points |
|---|---|---|---|---|---|---|---|
| 1 | 23 | (United Kingdom) Oliver Rowland | Nissan | 31 | 42:45.212 | 2 | 25 |
| 2 | 5 | (United Kingdom) Taylor Barnard | McLaren-Nissan | 31 | +5.844 | 1 | 18+3^{1} |
| 3 | 55 | (United Kingdom) Jake Hughes | Maserati | 31 | +6.855 | 3 | 15+1^{2} |
| 4 | 27 | (United Kingdom) Jake Dennis | Andretti-Porsche | 31 | +7.214 | 19 | 12 |
| 5 | 37 | (New Zealand) Nick Cassidy | Jaguar | 31 | +7.487 | 17 | 10 |
| 6 | 2 | (Belgium) Stoffel Vandoorne | Maserati | 31 | +8.005 | 22 | 8 |
| 7 | 25 | (France) Jean-Eric Vergne | DS Penske | 31 | +8.409 | 12 | 6 |
| 8 | 1 | (Germany) Pascal Wehrlein | Porsche | 31 | +11.517 | 13 | 4 |
| 9 | 33 | (United Kingdom) Dan Ticktum | Cupra Kiro-Porsche | 31 | +14.910 | 9 | 2 |
| 10 | 48 | (Switzerland) Edoardo Mortara | Mahindra | 31 | +15.964 | 5 | 1 |
| 11 | 51 | (Switzerland) Nico Müller | Andretti-Porsche | 31 | +16.284 | 21 | |
| 12 | 8 | (United Kingdom) Sam Bird | McLaren-Nissan | 31 | +17.179 (Note: Bird was given a 5-second time penalty due to not following the Race Director's instructions.) | 7 | |
| 13 | 21 | (Netherlands) Nyck De Vries | Mahindra | 31 | +20.788 | 8 | |
| 14 | 4 | (Netherlands) Robin Frijns | Envision | 31 | +21.164 | 14 | |
| 15 | 17 | (France) Norman Nato | Nissan | 31 | +21.511 | 10 | |
| 16 | 11 | (Brazil) Lucas Di Grassi | Lola Yamaha ABT | 31 | +22.961 | 16 | |
| 17 | 3 | (Germany) David Beckmann | Cupra Kiro-Porsche | 31 | +31.035 | 11 | |
| 18 | 22 | (Barbados) Zane Maloney | Lola Yamaha ABT | 31 | +1:14.502 | 20 | |
| 19 | 16 | (Switzerland) Sebastien Buemi | Envision | 31 | +1:18.601 | 18 | |
| DNF | 9 | (New Zealand) Mitch Evans | Jaguar | 22 | Technical issue | 15 | |
| DNF | 13 | (Portugal) António Félix da Costa | Porsche | 1 | Collision damage | 4 | |
| DNF | 7 | (Germany) Maximilian Günther | DS Penske | 0 | Collision damage | 6 | |

Notes:

- ^1 – Pole position.
- ^2 – Fastest lap.

==== Standings after the race ====
Drivers' Championship standings

| | Pos | Driver | Points |
|---|---|---|---|
| | 1 | (United Kingdom) Oliver Rowland | 68 |
| 2 | 2 | (United Kingdom) Taylor Barnard | 51 |
| 1 | 3 | (Portugal) António Félix da Costa | 39 |
| 1 | 4 | (Germany) Maximilian Günther | 37 |
| 7 | 5 | (United Kingdom) Jake Hughes | 27 |

Teams' Championship standings

| | Pos | Team | Points |
|---|---|---|---|
| 3 | 1 | (Japan) Nissan | 68 |
| 1 | 2 | (United Kingdom) McLaren | 67 |
| 2 | 3 | (Germany) Porsche | 64 |
| 2 | 4 | (United States) DS Penske | 63 |
| 2 | 5 | (Monaco) Maserati | 43 |

Manufacturers' Championship standings

| | Pos | Manufacturer | Points |
|---|---|---|---|
| | 1 | (Japan) Nissan | 130 |
| 1 | 2 | (Netherlands) Stellantis | 83 |
| 1 | 3 | (Germany) Porsche | 80 |
| | 4 | (United Kingdom) Jaguar | 58 |
| | 5 | (India) Mahindra | 52 |

- Notes: Only the top five positions are included for all three sets of standings.

== Notes ==
| Previous race: 2025 Mexico City ePrix | FIA Formula E World Championship; 2024–25 season | Next race: 2025 Miami ePrix |
| Previous race: N/A | Jeddah ePrix | Next race: 2026 Jeddah ePrix (February) |
