= 2025 Monaco ePrix =

Race 6 of 16 of the 2024–25 Formula E season
← Previous race	Next race →

Race details
- Date: 3 May 2025
- Location: Circuit de Monaco, Monte Carlo, Monaco
- Course: Street Circuit
- Course length: 3.337 km (2.074 mi)
- Distance: 30 (Note: 29 planned laps and 1 extra lap) laps, 100.11 km (62.21 mi)
- Scheduled distance: 29 laps, 96.773 km (60.132 mi)

Pole position
Driver	(United Kingdom) Taylor Barnard	McLaren-Nissan
- Time: 1:30.117

Fastest lap
Driver	(New Zealand) Nick Cassidy	Jaguar
- Time: 1:27.846

Podium
First	(United Kingdom) Oliver Rowland	Nissan
Second	(Netherlands) Nyck de Vries	Mahindra
Third	(United Kingdom) Jake Dennis	Andretti-Porsche

2025 Monaco ePrix
Race 7 of 16 of the 2024–25 Formula E season
← Previous race	Next race →

Race details
- Date: 4 May 2025
- Location: Circuit de Monaco, Monte Carlo, Monaco
- Course: Street Circuit
- Course length: 3.337 km (2.074 mi)
- Distance: 30 (Note: 29 planned laps and 1 extra lap) laps, 100.11 km (62.21 mi)
- Scheduled distance: 29 laps, 96.773 km (60.132 mi)
- Weather: Cloudy

Pole position
Driver	(United Kingdom) Oliver Rowland	Nissan
- Time: 1:55:897

Fastest lap
Driver	(United Kingdom) Dan Ticktum	Cupra Kiro
- Time: 1:37:560

Podium
First	(Switzerland) Sébastien Buemi	Envision Racing
Second	(United Kingdom) Oliver Rowland	Nissan
Third	(New Zealand) Nick Cassidy	Jaguar Racing

The 2025 Monaco ePrix was a Formula E electric car race held at the Circuit de Monaco in Monte Carlo, Monaco on 3–4 May 2025. It was the 8th edition of the Monaco ePrix and served as the sixth and seventh round of the 2024–25 Formula E World Championship.

== Background ==
Oliver Rowland entered the weekend in the lead of the championship with 69 points, 15 points ahead of António Félix da Costa and 18 points ahead of Pascal Wehrlein in third.

Porsche entered the weekend in the lead of the Teams' Championship on 105 points, with a 25-point lead over Nissan and a 38-point lead ahead of McLaren. Nissan lead the Manufacturers' Trophy with 146 points, 26 ahead of Porsche and 61 ahead of Stellantis.

The first race featured the Pit Boost quick charge feature.

== Classification ==
All times are in CEST.

=== Race 1 ===
==== Qualifying ====
Qualifying started at 10:40 AM on 3 May 2025.

Group draw
Group A	(United Kingdom) ROW	(Germany) WEH	(Germany) GUE	(United Kingdom) DEN	(France) JEV	(Netherlands) DEV	(United Kingdom) BIR	(Switzerland) MUE	(France) NAT	(Switzerland) BUE	(Barbados) MAL
Group B	(Portugal) DAC	(United Kingdom) BAR	(United Kingdom) HUG	(Switzerland) MOR	(New Zealand) EVA	(Brazil) DIG	(Belgium) VAN	(United Kingdom) TIC	(New Zealand) CAS	(Netherlands) FRI	(Germany) BEC

===== Qualifying duels =====
Quarter-finals
A2	(United Kingdom) Jake Dennis
A3	(Netherlands) Nyck de Vries
A1	(United Kingdom) Oliver Rowland
A4	(Germany) Pascal Wehrlein
B2	(New Zealand) Mitch Evans
B3	(United Kingdom) Taylor Barnard
B1	(United Kingdom) Dan Ticktum
B4	(Netherlands) Robin Frijns

Semi-finals
(Netherlands) Nyck de Vries
(United Kingdom) Oliver Rowland
(United Kingdom) Taylor Barnard
(United Kingdom) Dan Ticktum

Final
(United Kingdom) Oliver Rowland
(United Kingdom) Taylor Barnard

===== Overall classification =====
Pos.	No.	Driver	Team	A	B	QF	SF	F	Grid
1	5	(United Kingdom) Taylor Barnard	Mclaren-Nissan	—N/a	1:29:011	1:26:752	1:26:315	1:30:117	1
2	23	(United Kingdom) Oliver Rowland	Nissan	1:28:713	—N/a	1:26:709	1:26:617	—N/a	2
3	33	(United Kingdom) Dan Ticktum	Cupra Kiro-Porsche	—N/a	1:28:661	1:26:784	1:26:423	—N/a	3
4	21	(Netherlands) Nyck de Vries	Mahindra	1:28:848	—N/a	1:26:890	1:26:844	—N/a	4
5	1	(Germany) Pascal Wehrlein	Porsche	1:28:874	—N/a	1:26:862	—N/a	—N/a	5
6	4	(Netherlands) Robin Frijns	Envision-Jaguar	—N/a	1:29:036	1:26:955	—N/a	—N/a	6
7	27	(United Kingdom) Jake Dennis	Andretti-Porsche	1:28:780	—N/a	1:27:077	—N/a	—N/a	7
8	9	(New Zealand) Mitch Evans	Jaguar	—N/a	1:28:960	1:27:146	—N/a	—N/a	8
9	48	(Switzerland) Edoardo Mortara	Mahindra	—N/a	1:29:040	—N/a	—N/a	—N/a	9
10	7	(Germany) Maximilian Günther	DS Penske	1:28:948	—N/a	—N/a	—N/a	—N/a	10
11	3	(Germany) David Beckmann	Cupra Kiro-Porsche	—N/a	1:29:119	—N/a	—N/a	—N/a	11
12	8	(United Kingdom) Sam Bird	McLaren-Nissan	1:29:073	—N/a	—N/a	—N/a	—N/a	12
13	2	(Belgium) Stoffel Vandoorne	Maserati	—N/a	1:29:219	—N/a	—N/a	—N/a	13
14	51	(Switzerland) Nico Müller	Andretti-Porsche	1:29:167	—N/a	—N/a	—N/a	—N/a	14
15	13	(Portugal) António Félix da Costa	Porsche	—N/a	1:29:258	—N/a	—N/a	—N/a	15
16	25	(France) Jean-Eric Vergne	DS Penske	1:29:193	—N/a	—N/a	—N/a	—N/a	16
17	11	(Brazil) Lucas Di Grassi	Lola Yamaha ABT	—N/a	1:29:342	—N/a	—N/a	—N/a	17
18	17	(France) Norman Nato	Nissan	1:29:235	—N/a	—N/a	—N/a	—N/a	18
19	37	(New Zealand) Nick Cassidy	Jaguar	—N/a	1:29:388	—N/a	—N/a	—N/a	19
20	16	(Switzerland) Sébastian Buemi	Envision-Jaguar	1:29:335	—N/a	—N/a	—N/a	—N/a	20
21	55	(United Kingdom) Jake Hughes	Maserati	—N/a	1:29:492	—N/a	—N/a	—N/a	21
22	22	(Barbados) Zane Maloney	Lola Yamaha ABT	1:30:001	—N/a	—N/a	—N/a	—N/a	22

==== Race ====
The race started at 3:05 PM on 3 May 2025.

Pos.	No.	Driver	Team	Laps	Time/Retired	Grid	Points
1	23	(United Kingdom) Oliver Rowland	Nissan	30	52:21:444	2	25
2	21	(Netherlands) Nyck De Vries	Mahindra	30	+2.116	4	18
3	27	(United Kingdom) Jake Dennis	Andretti-Porsche	30	+7.523	7	15
4	48	(Switzerland) Edoardo Mortara	Mahindra	30	+11.375	9	12
5	51	(Switzerland) Nico Müller	Andretti-Porsche	30	+11.531	14	10
6	1	(Germany) Pascal Wehrlein	Porsche	30	+11.887	5	8+1^{2}
7	33	(United Kingdom) Dan Ticktum	Cupra Kiro-Porsche	30	+12.731	3	6
8	4	(Netherlands) Robin Frijns	Envision	30	+14.848	6	4
9	2	(Belgium) Stoffel Vandoorne	Maserati	30	+16.306	13	2
10	7	(Germany) Maximilian Günther	DS Penske	30	+16.340	10	1
11	8	(United Kingdom) Sam Bird	McLaren-Nissan	30	+17.579	12	
12	25	(France) Jean-Eric Vergne	DS Penske	30	+17.579	16	
13	11	(Brazil) Lucas Di Grassi	Lola Yamaha ABT	30	+18.105	7	
14	17	(France) Norman Nato	Nissan	30	+18.129	18	
15	5	(United Kingdom) Taylor Barnard	McLaren-Nissan	30	+20.913	1	3^{1}
16	55	(United Kingdom) Jake Hughes	Maserati	30	+21.274	21	
17	3	(Germany) David Beckmann	Cupra Kiro-Porsche	30	+53:761	11	
18	37	(New Zealand) Nick Cassidy	Jaguar	30	+57.435	19	
19	16	(Switzerland) Sébastien Buemi	Envision	30	+1:06.542	20	
20	9	(New Zealand) Mitch Evans	Jaguar	30	+1:07.087	8	
21	22	(Barbados) Zane Maloney	Lola Yamaha ABT	30	+1:14.218	22	
Ret	13	(Portugal) António Félix da Costa	Porsche	7	Collision	15	

Notes:

- ^1 – Pole position.
- ^2 – Fastest lap.

==== Standings after the race ====
Drivers' Championship standings

	Pos	Driver	Points
	1	(United Kingdom) Oliver Rowland	94
1	2	(Germany) Pascal Wehrlein	60
1	3	(Portugal) António Félix da Costa	54
	4	(United Kingdom) Taylor Barnard	54
6	5	(Netherlands) Nyck de Vries	42

Teams' Championship standings

	Pos	Team	Points
	1	(Germany) Porsche	114
	2	(Japan) Nissan	105
2	3	(India) Mahindra	81
1	4	(United Kingdom) McLaren	70
2	5	(United States) Andretti	66

Manufacturers' Championship standings

	Pos	Manufacturer	Points
	1	(Japan) Nissan	173
	2	(Germany) Porsche	145
1	3	(India) Mahindra	98
1	4	(Netherlands) Stellantis	95
	5	(United Kingdom) Jaguar	75

- Notes: Only the top five positions are included for all three sets of standings.

=== Race 2 ===
==== Qualifying ====
Qualifying started at 10:40 AM on 4 May 2025.

Group draw
Group A	(United Kingdom) ROW	(Portugal) DAC	(Netherlands) DEV	(Switzerland) MOR	(United Kingdom) HUG	(New Zealand) EVA	(Brazil) DIG	(United Kingdom) TIC	(France) NAT	(Netherlands) FRI	(Barbados) MAL
Group B	(Germany) WEH	(United Kingdom) BAR	(United Kingdom) DEN	(Germany) GUE	(France) JEV	(Switzerland) MUE	(Belgium) VAN	(United Kingdom) BIR	(New Zealand) CAS	(Switzerland) BUE	(Germany) BEC

===== Qualifying duels =====
Quarter-finals
A2	(Portugal) António Félix da Costa
A3	(United Kingdom) Oliver Rowland
A1	(Netherlands) Nyck de Vries
A4	(United Kingdom) Dan Ticktum
B2	(France) Jean-Éric Vergne
B3	(Belgium) Stoffel Vandoorne
B1	(Switzerland) Sébastien Buemi
B4	(Germany) Maximilian Günther

Semi-finals
(United Kingdom) Oliver Rowland
(Netherlands) Nyck de Vries
(France) Jean-Éric Vergne
(Germany) Maximilian Günther

Final
(United Kingdom) Oliver Rowland
None (Note: Vergne and Günther both failed to set a time in the semi-final. Neither were qualified for the final and Rowland automatically won the final.)

===== Overall classification =====
Pos.	No.	Driver	Team	A	B	QF	SF	Grid
1	23	(United Kingdom) Oliver Rowland	Nissan	1:56:529	—N/a	1:48:032	1:55:897	1
2	21	(Netherlands) Nyck de Vries	Mahindra	1:55:385	—N/a	1:48:167	1:58:459	2
3	7	(Germany) Maximilian Günther	DS Penske	—N/a	1:53:690	1:48:689	No time	3
4	25	(France) Jean-Eric Vergne	DS Penske	—N/a	1:53:163	1:48:481	No time	4
5	2	(Belgium) Stoffel Vandoorne	Maserati	—N/a	1:53:441	1:49:238	—N/a	5
6	13	(Portugal) António Félix da Costa	Porsche	1:56:100	—N/a	1:49:455	—N/a	6
7	33	(United Kingdom) Dan Ticktum	Cupra Kiro-Porsche	1:56:779	—N/a	No time	—N/a	7
8	16	(Switzerland) Sébastian Buemi	Envision-Jaguar	—N/a	1:52:480	No time	—N/a	8
9	22	(Barbados) Zane Maloney	Lola Yamaha ABT	1:56:818	—N/a	—N/a	—N/a	9
10	1	(Germany) Pascal Wehrlein	Porsche	—N/a	1:53:794	—N/a	—N/a	10
11	11	(Brazil) Lucas Di Grassi	Lola Yamaha ABT	1:56:827	—N/a	—N/a	—N/a	11
12	27	(United Kingdom) Jake Dennis	Andretti-Porsche	—N/a	1:53:842	—N/a	—N/a	12
13	55	(United Kingdom) Jake Hughes	Maserati	1:57:181	—N/a	—N/a	—N/a	13
14	37	(New Zealand) Nick Cassidy	Jaguar	—N/a	1:53:899	—N/a	—N/a	14
15	17	(France) Norman Nato	Nissan	1:57:202	—N/a	—N/a	—N/a	15
16	5	(United Kingdom) Taylor Barnard	Mclaren-Nissan	—N/a	1:54:073	—N/a	—N/a	16
17	9	(New Zealand) Mitch Evans	Jaguar	1:57:296	—N/a	—N/a	—N/a	17
18	3	(Germany) David Beckmann	Cupra Kiro-Porsche	—N/a	1:54:467	—N/a	—N/a	18
19	4	(Netherlands) Robin Frijns	Envision-Jaguar	1:57:403	—N/a	—N/a	—N/a	19
20	51	(Switzerland) Nico Müller	Andretti-Porsche	—N/a	1:54:751	—N/a	—N/a	20
21	48	(Switzerland) Edoardo Mortara	Mahindra	1:58:238	—N/a	—N/a	—N/a	21
22	8	(United Kingdom) Sam Bird	McLaren-Nissan	—N/a	1:59:064	—N/a	—N/a	22

==== Race ====
The race started at 3:05 PM on 4 May 2025.

Pos.	No.	Driver	Team	Laps	Time/Retired	Grid	Points
1	16	(Switzerland) Sébastien Buemi	Envision	30	56:18:398	8	25
2	23	(United Kingdom) Oliver Rowland	Nissan	30	+4.169	1	18+3^{1}
3	37	(New Zealand) Nick Cassidy	Jaguar	30	+6.342	14	15
4	13	(Portugal) António Félix da Costa	Porsche	30	+6:561	6	12+1^{2}
5	21	(Netherlands) Nyck De Vries	Mahindra	30	+10.978	2	10
6	25	(France) Jean-Eric Vergne	DS Penske	30	+16.537	4	8
7	1	(Germany) Pascal Wehrlein	Porsche	30	+16.764	10	6
8	7	(Germany) Maximilian Günther	DS Penske	30	+17.545	3	4
9	27	(United Kingdom) Jake Dennis	Andretti-Porsche	30	+17.882	12	2
10	2	(Belgium) Stoffel Vandoorne	Maserati	30	+18.780	5	1
11	4	(Netherlands) Robin Frijns	Envision	30	+20.337	19	
12	48	(Switzerland) Edoardo Mortara	Mahindra	30	+21.811	21	
13	17	(France) Norman Nato	Nissan	30	+23.592	15	
14	22	(Barbados) Zane Maloney	Lola Yamaha ABT	30	+26.190	9	
15	33	(United Kingdom) Dan Ticktum	Cupra Kiro-Porsche	30	+37.787	7	
16	5	(United Kingdom) Taylor Barnard	McLaren-Nissan	30	+49.001	16	
17	55	(United Kingdom) Jake Hughes	Maserati	30	+50.783	13	
18	9	(New Zealand) Mitch Evans	Jaguar	30	+1:13.103	17	
19	3	(Germany) David Beckmann	Cupra Kiro-Porsche	30	+1:23.354	18	
20	8	(United Kingdom) Sam Bird	McLaren-Nissan	30	+1:34.021	22	
Ret	51	(Switzerland) Nico Müller	Andretti-Porsche	12	Accident	20	
Ret	11	(Brazil) Lucas Di Grassi	Lola Yamaha ABT	6	Crash	11	

Notes:

- ^1 – Pole position.
- ^2 – Fastest lap.

==== Standings after the race ====
Drivers' Championship standings

	Pos	Driver	Points
	1	(United Kingdom) Oliver Rowland	115
1	2	(Portugal) António Félix da Costa	67
1	3	(Germany) Pascal Wehrlein	66
	4	(United Kingdom) Taylor Barnard	54
	5	(Netherlands) Nyck de Vries	52

Teams' Championship standings

	Pos	Team	Points
	1	(Germany) Porsche	133
	2	(Japan) Nissan	126
	3	(India) Mahindra	91
2	4	(United States) DS Penske	76
1	5	(United Kingdom) McLaren	70

Manufacturers' Championship standings

	Pos	Manufacturer	Points
	1	(Japan) Nissan	192
	2	(Germany) Porsche	163
2	5	(United Kingdom) Jaguar	115
1	3	(India) Mahindra	110
1	4	(Netherlands) Stellantis	107

- Notes: Only the top five positions are included for all three sets of standings.

== Notes ==
Previous race: 2025 Miami ePrix	FIA Formula E World Championship; 2024–25 season	Next race: 2025 Tokyo ePrix
Previous race: 2024 Monaco ePrix	Monaco ePrix	Next race: 2026 Monaco ePrix
