= 2024–25 Formula E World Championship =

Motorsport racing series

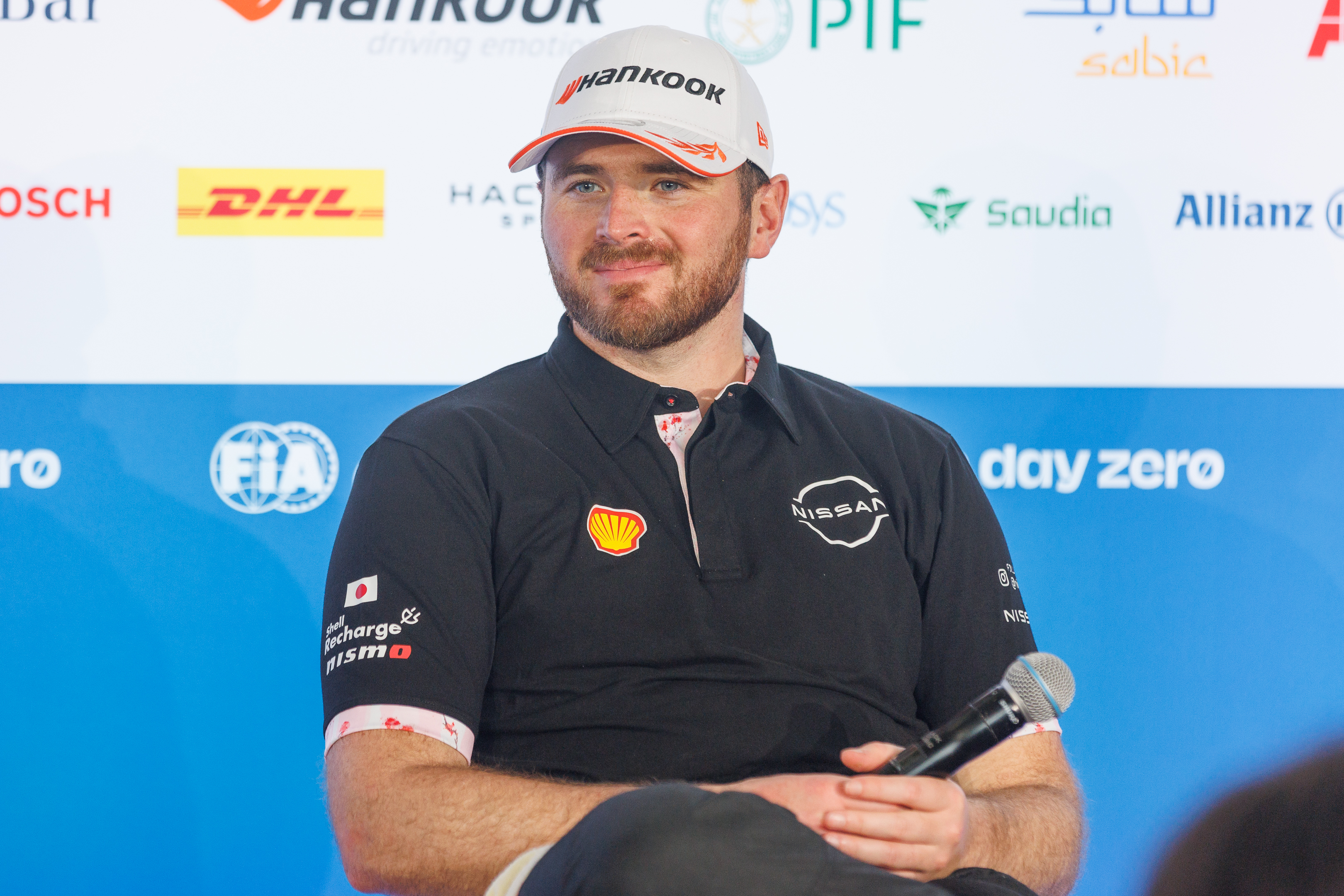
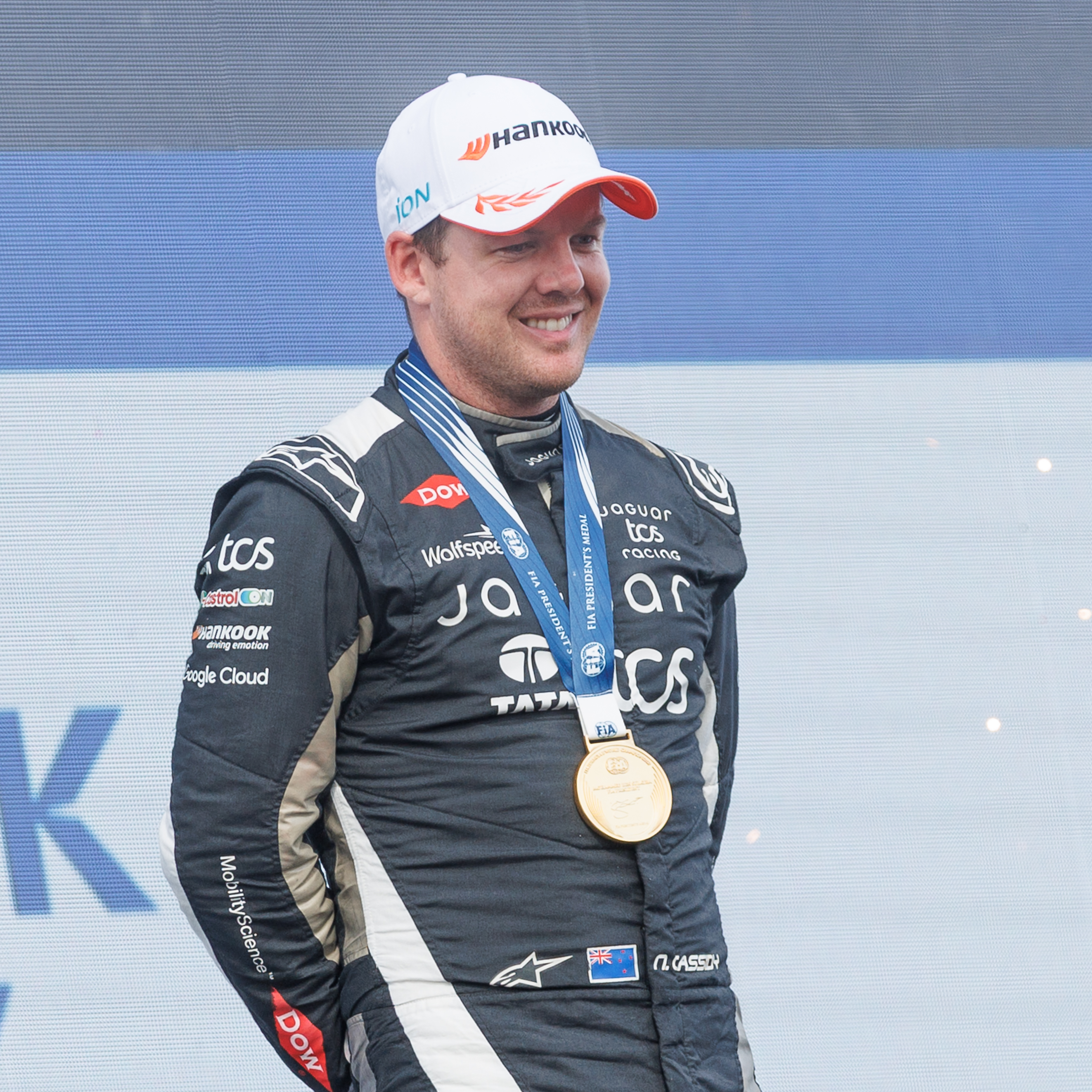
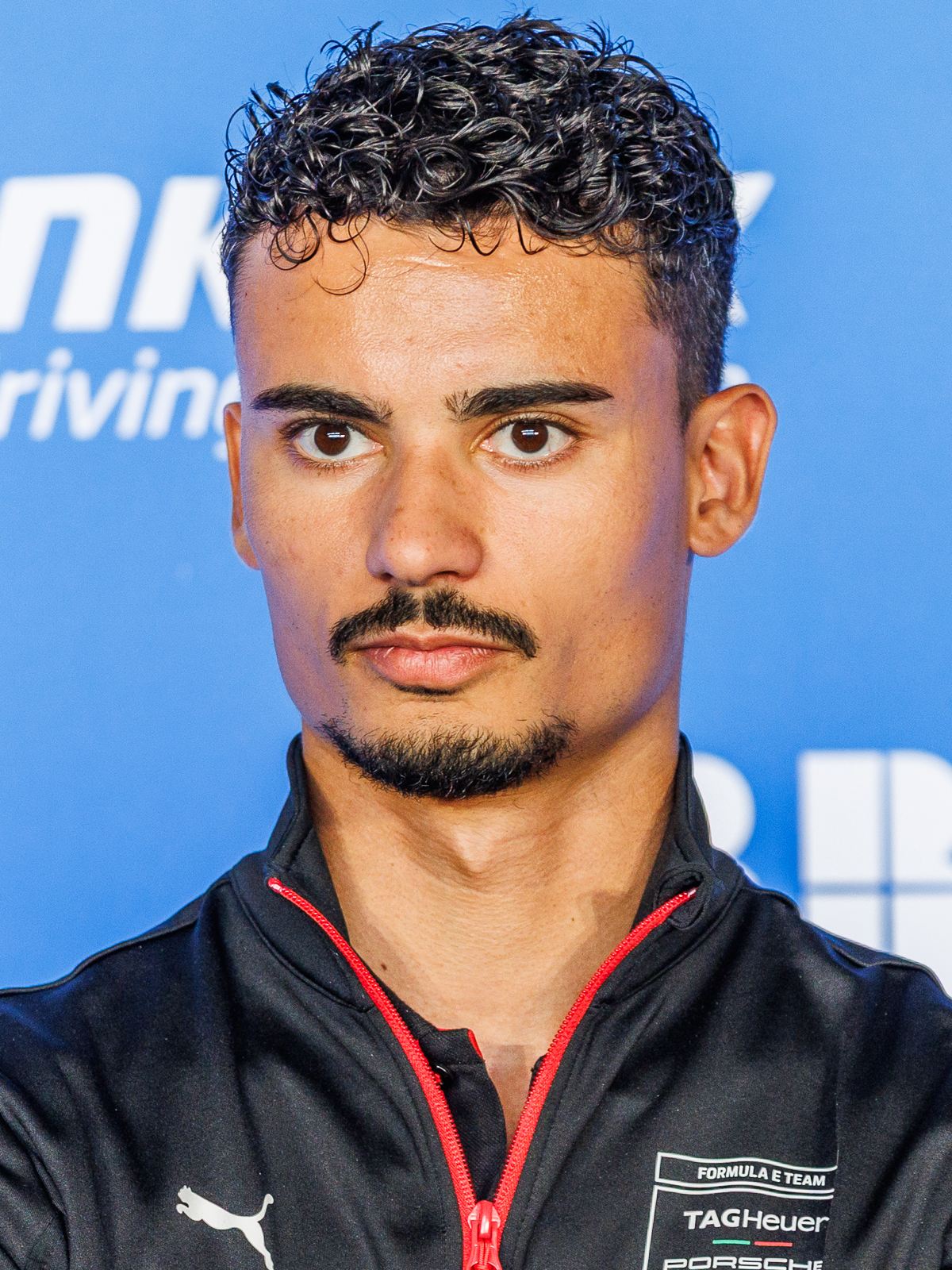
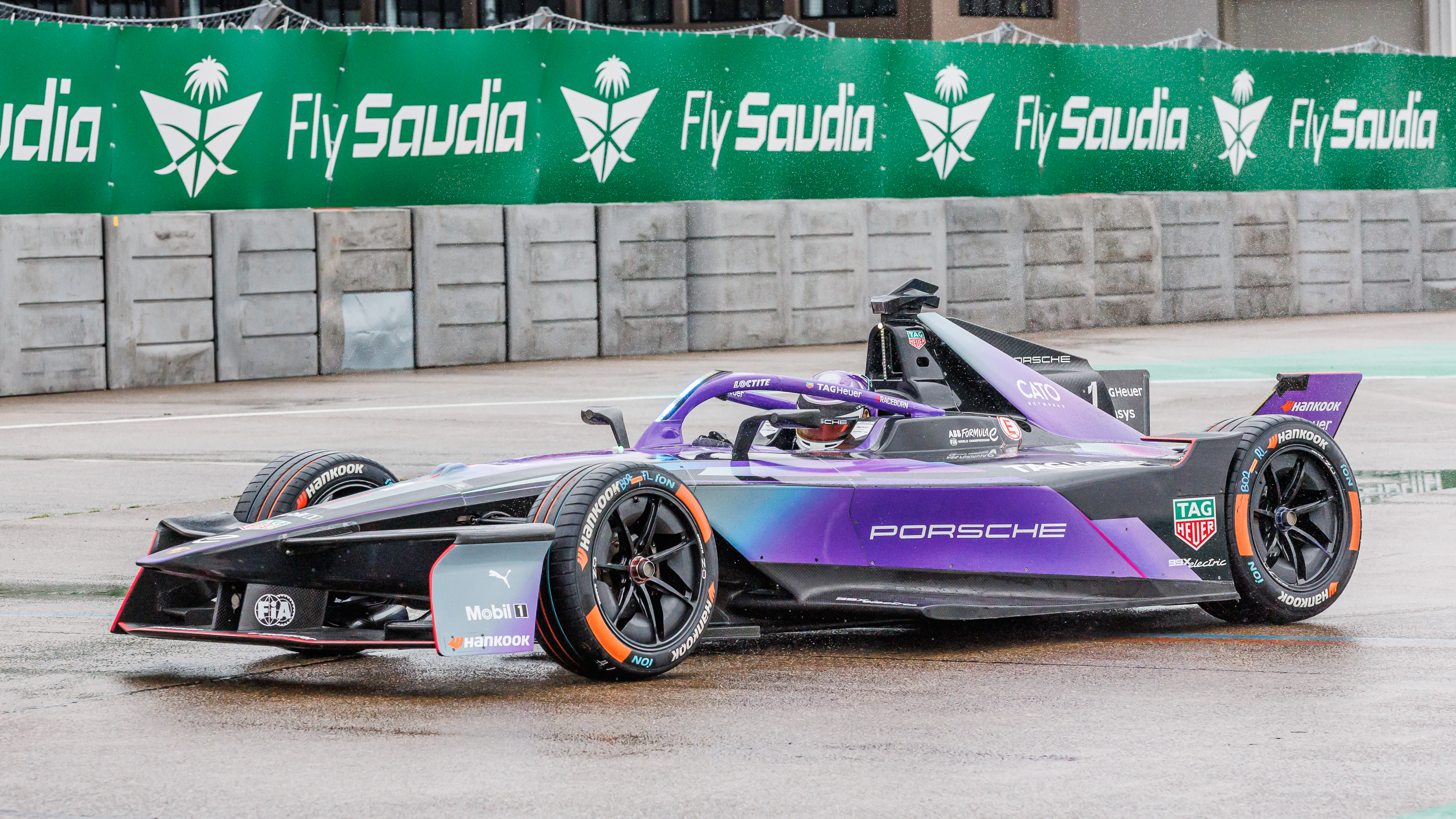
Oliver Rowland (top) won the Drivers' championship. Nick Cassidy (middle left) ended the season as runner-up, while Pascal Wehrlein (middle right) finished third. TAG Heuer Porsche Formula E Team and Porsche (bottom) won the Teams' Championship and the Manufacturers' Championship for the first time in their history.

The 2024–25 ABB FIA Formula E World Championship was the eleventh season of the FIA Formula E championship, a motor racing championship for electrically powered vehicles recognised by motorsport's governing body, the Fédération Internationale de l'Automobile (FIA), as the highest class of competition for electric open-wheel racing cars.

Oliver Rowland, driving for the Nissan Formula E Team, won his first World Drivers' Championship with two races to spare at the Berlin ePrix. TAG Heuer Porsche Formula E Team won the Teams' Championship for the first time in their history at the final race of the season, with Porsche also winning the Manufacturers' Championship.

== Teams and drivers ==
All teams used the Formula E Gen3 Evo car on Hankook tyres.

Team	Powertrain	No.	Drivers	Rounds
(Germany) TAG Heuer Porsche Formula E Team	Porsche 99X Electric (Note: The 99X Electric branding has been used for every Formula E powertrain developed by Porsche ever since their debut season. This is the fourth powertrain.)	1	(Germany) Pascal Wehrlein	All
(Germany) TAG Heuer Porsche Formula E Team	Porsche 99X Electric	13	(Portugal) António Félix da Costa	All
(Monaco) Maserati MSG Racing	Maserati Tipo Folgore (Note: The Maserati powertrain is a rebadged DS, contributing points towards Stellantis' total in the Manufacturers' Standings.)	2	(Belgium) Stoffel Vandoorne	All
(Monaco) Maserati MSG Racing	Maserati Tipo Folgore	55	(United Kingdom) Jake Hughes	All
(United States) Cupra Kiro	Porsche 99X Electric WCG3 (Note: Kiro are using the previous (third) generation of the Porsche 99X Electric powertrain, updated to meet current regulations.)	3	(Germany) David Beckmann	All
(United States) Cupra Kiro	Porsche 99X Electric WCG3	33	(United Kingdom) Dan Ticktum	All
(United Kingdom) Envision Racing	Jaguar I-Type 7	4	(Netherlands) Robin Frijns	All
(United Kingdom) Envision Racing	Jaguar I-Type 7	16	(Switzerland) Sébastien Buemi	All
(United Kingdom) Neom McLaren Formula E Team	Nissan e-4ORCE 05	5	(United Kingdom) Taylor Barnard	All
(United Kingdom) Neom McLaren Formula E Team	Nissan e-4ORCE 05	8	(United Kingdom) Sam Bird	All
(United States) DS Penske	DS E-Tense FE25	7	(Germany) Maximilian Günther	All
(United States) DS Penske	DS E-Tense FE25	25	(France) Jean-Éric Vergne	All
(United Kingdom) Jaguar TCS Racing	Jaguar I-Type 7	9	(New Zealand) Mitch Evans	All
(United Kingdom) Jaguar TCS Racing	Jaguar I-Type 7	37	(New Zealand) Nick Cassidy	All
(United Kingdom) Lola Yamaha ABT Formula E Team	Lola-Yamaha T001	11	(Brazil) Lucas di Grassi	All
(United Kingdom) Lola Yamaha ABT Formula E Team	Lola-Yamaha T001	22	(Barbados) Zane Maloney	All
(Japan) Nissan Formula E Team	Nissan e-4ORCE 05	17	(France) Norman Nato	1–12, 15–16
(Japan) Nissan Formula E Team	Nissan e-4ORCE 05	17	(Brazil) Sérgio Sette Câmara	13–14
(Japan) Nissan Formula E Team	Nissan e-4ORCE 05	23	(United Kingdom) Oliver Rowland	All
(India) Mahindra Racing	Mahindra M11Electro	21	(Netherlands) Nyck de Vries	1–12, 15–16
(India) Mahindra Racing	Mahindra M11Electro	21	(Brazil) Felipe Drugovich	13–14
(India) Mahindra Racing	Mahindra M11Electro	48	(Switzerland) Edoardo Mortara	All
(United States) Andretti Formula E	Porsche 99X Electric	27	(United Kingdom) Jake Dennis	All
(United States) Andretti Formula E	Porsche 99X Electric	51	(Switzerland) Nico Müller	All

=== Team changes ===
British motorsport brand Lola announced its return to top-level motorsport for the first time since the 2006 Champ Car World Series. Lola entered Formula E developing its own powertrain in cooperation with Yamaha. This partnership supplied powertrains to ABT, who had previously used Mahindra powertrains but ended that affiliation, and the team entered the season as Lola Yamaha ABT Formula E Team.

After just a single year running, ERT Formula E Team was acquired by investment firm The Forest Road Company. The team rebranded as Kiro Race Co and raced under an American license. The team also ceased to be its own manufacturer, forming an agreement with Porsche to use its 2023–24 powertrain instead. Ahead of the São Paulo ePrix weekend, Cupra entered into a partnership with Kiro Race Co to enter the season as Cupra Kiro Race Co. Cupra previously partnered with Abt in the last two seasons of the championship.

=== Driver changes ===
Season 8 champion Stoffel Vandoorne ended his contract with DS Penske after two seasons and joined Maserati MSG Racing in place of Maximilian Günther, who signed with DS Penske, thereby completing a driver swap between the two Stellantis-owned outfits. Jehan Daruvala's contract at Maserati was also not renewed, with the team instead signing McLaren driver Jake Hughes. To replace Hughes, McLaren promoted reserve and developmental driver Taylor Barnard to a full-time drive.

Andretti driver Norman Nato left the team after a single season to return to the Nissan Formula E Team, with whom he last raced in 2023, replacing Sacha Fenestraz, who left the team after two seasons to return to Super Formula with Team TOM'S. Nico Müller left ABT after two seasons with the team to replace Nato at Andretti. Müller's replacement at ABT was announced to be Formula 2 driver and former Andretti reserve driver Zane Maloney, who made his Formula E debut, thereby becoming the first Barbadian driver to compete in the series.

New team Cupra Kiro signed Porsche reserve driver David Beckmann for his full-time debut alongside Dan Ticktum. He replaced Sérgio Sette Câmara, who was hired by Nissan Formula E Team as reserve driver.

==== Mid-season ====
Two drivers missed the Berlin E-Prix double-header because of a calendar clash with the FIA World Endurance Championship's 6 Hours of São Paulo. Nissan's Norman Nato was replaced by the team's reserve driver Sérgio Sette Câmara, while Mahindra's Nyck de Vries was replaced by 2022 Formula 2 champion Felipe Drugovich.

== Calendar ==
The following ePrix took place in the 2024–25 Formula E World Championship.

Round	E-Prix	Country	Circuit	Date
1	São Paulo ePrix	Brazil	São Paulo Street Circuit	7 December 2024
2	Mexico City ePrix	Mexico	Autódromo Hermanos Rodríguez	11 January 2025
3	Jeddah ePrix	Saudi Arabia	Jeddah Corniche Circuit	14 February 2025
4	Jeddah ePrix	Saudi Arabia	Jeddah Corniche Circuit	15 February 2025
5	Miami ePrix	United States	Homestead–Miami Speedway	12 April 2025
6	Monaco ePrix	Monaco	Circuit de Monaco	3 May 2025
7	Monaco ePrix	Monaco	Circuit de Monaco	4 May 2025
8	Tokyo ePrix	Japan	Tokyo Street Circuit	17 May 2025
9	Tokyo ePrix	Japan	Tokyo Street Circuit	18 May 2025
10	Shanghai ePrix	China	Shanghai International Circuit	31 May 2025
11	Shanghai ePrix	China	Shanghai International Circuit	1 June 2025
12	Jakarta ePrix	Indonesia	Jakarta International e-Prix Circuit	21 June 2025
13	Berlin ePrix	Germany	Tempelhof Airport Street Circuit	12 July 2025
14	Berlin ePrix	Germany	Tempelhof Airport Street Circuit	13 July 2025
15	London ePrix	United Kingdom	ExCeL London Circuit	26 July 2025
16	London ePrix	United Kingdom	ExCeL London Circuit	27 July 2025

== Regulation changes ==
=== Technical regulations ===
The championship introduced an upgrade to its Gen3 ruleset, called Gen3 Evo. The updated ruleset featured a new chassis package featuring a more robust front wing and new Hankook tyres aimed at providing increased grip. The new car also contained an active front power train to be used in qualifying, the race start and during attack mode, increasing acceleration and power output.

Quick-charging pit stops were introduced from the Jeddah E-Prix onwards, more than two years after the initial announcement of the feature. The new "Pit Boost" was used in all double-header race weekends of the season. It required all drivers to make a mandatory pit stop taking around 30 seconds, during which the cars' batteries were recharged by around 10%. This pit stop had to be taken in a certain window in the race, chosen by the race officials prior to the event. No other work on the cars was allowed to be carried out during the quick-charging pit stops, and only one car per team was able to take this stop at a time.

=== Sporting regulations ===
The Manufacturers' Trophy introduced in season ten became a World Championship title alongside the Teams' and Drivers' titles. Points were awarded in a similar manner to the Teams' title and are based on the performance of each manufacturer's two highest-scoring cars in every race.

== Season report ==
=== Pre-season ===
Pre-season testing for the 2024–25 season was set to take place at the Circuit Ricardo Tormo in Valencia from 4–7 November 2024, before flooding in the area forced the championship to postpone and relocate the test to Circuito del Jarama on 5–8 November 2024. Both Nissan and Jaguar were forced to skip the first of the four days as part of their penalty for exceeding the cost cap in the 2022–23 season. Still, Jaguar and Mitch Evans set the fastest time of the test on the final day ahead of Cupra Kiro’s Dan Ticktum and Porsche's Pascal Wehrlein, with the reigning champion also leading his teammate António Félix da Costa to a Porsche 1-2 in the test’s traditional simulation race. An all-female test session, the first of its kind in an FIA-sanctioned championship, concluded pre-season testing on 8 November. 2024 F1 Academy champion Abbi Pulling posted the fastest time, driving for Nissan.

=== Opening rounds ===
The season began with the São Paulo ePrix, where reigning champion Wehrlein beat Nissan’s Oliver Rowland in the final duel to claim pole position. The Gen3 Evo’s active front powertrain coupled with a new softer tyre compound saw drivers able to easily gain many positions while in attack mode, with Jaguar’s Nick Cassidy using it to take an early lead as Wehrlein dropped to fifth. Rowland reclaimed the lead on lap 14, swapping first place with both Porsche drivers before Jake Dennis’ Andretti suffered an electrical failure causing a red flag. Rowland led the restart before being hit with a drive-through penalty. Cassidy’s final attack mode vaulted him to first place before Evans, who had started 22nd and spent the race climbing up the order, took the lead. Cassidy and Wehrlein made contact while fighting behind him, which saw the latter flip and hit the wall heavily, triggering a second red flag. Evans led the three-lap restart to win by 0.3 seconds ahead of da Costa and McLaren’s Taylor Barnard, who became the series’ youngest podium finisher.

Round two, the Mexico City ePrix, saw Porsche lock out the front row in qualifying, with Wehrlein ahead of da Costa. Wehrlein led for the first 15 laps before Dennis used attack mode to overtake him. The Porsche-powered trio battled for the podium positions for most of the race. A safety car interrupted the race late on when Cupra Kiro's David Beckmann collided with Lola Yamaha ABT's Lucas di Grassi. Rowland, who had taken attack mode shortly before the safety car was called, was still in the higher power mode when the race resumed and used that advantage to overtake Dennis, Wehrlein and da Costa within twelve corners to take the lead. Immediately after, another safety car was called as Evans had collided with Andretti's Nico Müller. Rowland held off an attacking da Costa on the final restart to win the race for Nissan, with da Costa and Wehrlein rounding out the podium, and Dennis finishing fourth. Back-to-back podiums meant that da Costa took an early lead in the championship, 12 points ahead of Rowland, with Evans now third.

The first double header of the season saw Formula E debut around the Jeddah Corniche Circuit for the Jeddah ePrix. The weekend began with a rookie free practice session, where Formula 2 driver Kush Maini set the fastest time for Mahindra. Race one brought the debut of the new 'pit boost' format. DS Penske's Maximilian Günther started from pole position and led until a safety car was called to recover debris from the car of da Costa after a collision with Müller. Günther gave up the lead to Rowland in order to save energy, and the latter controlled the race after the pitstops. The introduction of pit boost did not go without issues, with Ticktum's car requiring a reset that dropped him out of a top ten position. Towards the end of the race, Rowland began to struggle for energy, allowing Günther to overtake him in the final lap and win the race. Barnard came third to secure another podium in just his fourth Formula E race. A second-place finish for Rowland meant he took the championship lead, ahead of da Costa by four points.

The second race followed the regular format without mandatory pitstops. Barnard became the youngest pole sitter in Formula E history, starting from the front row alongside Rowland. On the opening lap, Günther misjudged his braking into turn two and crashed into da Costa, forcing both into retirement. Barnard led the early part of the race before being overtaken by Rowland on lap 9. Envision's Robin Frijns took the lead on lap 12, but was lower on energy than the following cars, allowing Rowland to retake first place two laps later. Barnard and Dennis then both led for brief stints after activating their attack modes, but Rowland crucially saved his final six minutes of higher power until late in the race. He retook first place with five laps to go and quickly built a gap, aided by a four-car battle breaking out for second place. That fight was won by Barnard, who finished second after overtaking two cars in one corner, while Maserati MSG Racing's Jake Hughes rounded out the podium. Rowland's points lead now stood at 17 points.

Round five was the return of the Miami ePrix, held at Homestead-Miami Speedway for the first time. Nissan's Norman Nato beat former teammate Dennis to take his maiden pole position. The majority of the race saw energy management and peloton-style racing, with Wehrlein and da Costa keeping in strong positions at the front of the pack. However, with six laps remaining, a red flag was called after Hughes, Günther and Evans collided in the final chicane and blocked the track. With only four laps remaining after the restart, those drivers who still had six minutes of attack mode left were unable to use it all up, thereby violating the sporting regulations and attracting penalties. That concerned on-track winner Nato, third-placed Frijns as well as championship leader Rowland and the McLaren pair of Barnard and Sam Bird. Wehrlein thereby inherited the win, with di Grassi in second claiming Lola's maiden podium and da Costa in third. Rowland finished eleventh, but retained his championship lead, fifteen points ahead of da Costa.

=== Mid-season rounds ===
Monaco held a double-header for the first time, with Saturday's race featuring the pit boost format. Barnard claimed his second pole position after championship leader Rowland hit the wall in the final. Rowland took the lead on lap twelve and was challenged by the Andretti and Mahindra drivers, who used attack mode and pit boost to move through the field. Mahindra’s Nyck de Vries took the lead on lap 24 ahead of Müller, who had recovered from a lap one puncture, and Dennis. Rowland once again staved off his final attack mode until all other front runners had spent theirs. He used his deployment to reclaim the lead a lap later and won the race two seconds ahead of de Vries. Dennis in second was given a five-second penalty for speeding under full-course yellow, but teammate Müller held up the field behind him, allowing Dennis to keep place on the podium. Müller, however, was forced to sacrifice his fourth place. Rowland extended his championship lead to 34 points ahead of reigning champion Wehrlein, who finished sixth.

Sunday's race began with a chaotic qualifying session held in wet conditions. In semi-final one, both Rowland and de Vries ran off the road at Sainte-Devote, but Rowland recovered faster to win the duel. Günther and Penske’s Jean-Éric Vergne then had their lap times deleted in semi-final two, so Rowland was given pole position without the final duel taking place. He held the lead at the start but once again chose to take attack mode later than those behind, giving Vergne the lead on lap six. Rowland took his first attack mode on lap 18, but a fight between the top two at the Nouvelle Chicane saw de Vries take the lead. Buemi, who had moved up the field to fourth, used his second attack mode to take first place. He built a gap of over three seconds that Rowland was unable to overcome. Buemi took a record-breaking fourteenth win, his first since 2019. Rowland finished second, while Cassidy claimed his first podium of the season after starting 13th. Rowland's lead in the championship grew to 48 points, now ahead of da Costa.

Tokyo also became a double header for 2025. Qualifying for Saturday's race was cancelled due to poor weather, and Rowland was given pole position based on the results of the second free practice session. The race began behind the safety car as the track was still wet, before a standing start on lap five. Rowland held the lead as others behind took early attack modes, but due to the conditions, there were few position changes. Stoffel Vandoorne and Maserati ran a unique strategy, choosing to use more energy at the start, which allowed him to stop for his pit boost earlier than others. Shortly after he made his stop, the race was red flagged when Günther stopped on track with an electrical issue. Rowland maintained the lead on the restart, but as all cars beside Vandoorne still had to make their mandatory stops, he cycled through to the front with a 25-second lead. Despite a spin, he won his first race in three years ahead of Rowland and Barnard. With Porsche once again struggling, Rowland's championship lead increased to 60 points.

Sunday was dry, but began with disappointment for Ticktum: He had looked on course for pole position before crashing in his final duel against Rowland. Evans, who had still not scored a point since his win in the opening race, was unable to start. With his usual strategy of taking attack mode late, Rowland was shuffled from first to sixth in the opening part of the race, with Wehrlein leading from Ticktum and Barnard. All drivers in the top ten took their second attack mode around lap 23, but Rowland had six minutes remaining compared to four minutes for most others, and he fought back to take the lead. On lap 29, Mahindra’s Edoardo Mortara collided with Barnard, sending the latter into the wall and triggering a late safety car. With one lap remaining on the restart, everyone was able to drive flat out, with Rowland taking the win at Nissan's home race ahead of Wehrlein, while Ticktum came third to take his maiden podium in Formula E. Rowland’s fourth win of the year saw him leave Tokyo with a monumental gap of 77 points to Wehrlein.

Next was the Shanghai ePrix, where the first race featured the first pit boost appearance on a heavily energy-sensitive circuit. Günther claimed pole position ahead of Barnard in the final duel. As usual in the peloton-style races, being in front was not the preferred position, and so the lead switched hands multiple times throughout the race. Drivers began to take their pitstops on lap twelve, with Rowland rejoining in seventh as the net leader on lap 17. Günther remained near the front and saved his second attack mode until late in the race. That allowed him to win with a gap of seven seconds. The rest of the podium spots were heavily debated and both changed in the final corner: Ticktum had moved from 21st on the grid to second, but lost out to both Vergne and Barnard, with Rowland finishing behind him in fifth. It was DS Penske's first 1-2 result. With both Porsche drivers finishing outside the points after having to heavily save energy in the latter stages of the race, Barnard improved to second in the standings, 86 points behind Rowland.

Shanghai’s Sunday race was the third race of the season to be affected by rain. Practice was red-flagged for the majority of the session, and only the group stages were held in qualifying. Cassidy set the fastest time overall to claim pole position. The race began behind the safety car after being delayed for multiple hours. With conditions still very slippery and rain continuing to fall throughout the race, Cassidy in front made the most of being the only one without reduced vision from other cars’ spraying water. He held his lead throughout the race, building a gap of seven seconds to the Porsche duo of Wehrlein and da Costa to take his first win since Berlin in 2024. Wehrlein had started closing the gap to Cassidy mid-race, but slipped off track, undoing his progress, while the Kiwi in front remained faultless all throughout. Multiple drivers struggled with the wet conditions, with Rowland among them. He finished the race 13th, gaining no points for the first time since São Paulo. That reduced his championship lead to 68 points ahead of Wehrlein.

=== Closing rounds ===
Jakarta returned to the calendar after a one-year absence to host round twelve, where Dennis defeated Barnard in the final duel to take his first pole position of the season. He held the lead at the start of the race, but took a shorter attack mode period than de Vries behind. When the latter tried taking the lead, he cut back too soon, breaking Dennis' front wing. The field was neutralised with a full course yellow and a chaotic restart followed: Dennis dropped through the field after his speed limiter did not deactivate, de Vries suffered a technical malfunction, and Vandoorne crashed heavily in turn 7. This gave Ticktum, who was fourth at the restart, the lead of the race and he took his maiden win and his team’s first since the 2015 Moscow ePrix. Mortara came second, with Buemi in third. He had initially been hit with a penalty dropping him to fourth, but this ruling was overturned two weeks later, reinstating his podium. Rowland finished tenth, retaining a 69-point championship lead over Wehrlein, who ended the race outside the points.

Next up was the double-header in Berlin. De Vries and Nato were absent due to the 2025 6 Hours of São Paulo and were replaced by Felipe Drugovich and Sérgio Sette Câmara. Rain once again affected the Saturday race, with only the group stages held in qualifying; Evans took pole position by setting the fastest lap in Group A, with Frijns alongside him on the front row. Evans held the lead at the start and built a ten-second gap over the majority of the field. Wehrlein was the only driver also in contention after working his way through the field in the early stages of the race, before sliding off while trying to take the lead on the penultimate lap. Evans was therefore able to take his first victory – and first points – since the opening race. Da Costa finished third on the road, but was given a five-second penalty for spinning Hughes, promoting Mortara to the podium. Rowland, who went into the race with a chance to seal the title, retired from the race after making contact with Vandoorne, reducing his championship lead to Wehrlein to 50 points.

Wehrlein reduced the gap further by taking pole position for Berlin’s second race, defeating Ticktum in the final duel. Rowland qualified third but started eighth, receiving a five-place grid penalty for the previous day's contact with Vandoorne. Wehrlein stayed near the front in the early part of the race, but chose a different attack mode strategy to the majority of the field. That saw him drop down the order, and he was unable to recover. Those who started far down the grid had opposite fortunes; Cassidy cycled to the lead from 20th on the grid, winning the second race in as many days for his Jaguar team, followed by Dennis and Vergne. Rowland remained in contention for the victory throughout the race and finished the race in fourth in the end. This result, coupled with Wehrlein finishing down in 15th place, saw Rowland secure his maiden World Drivers' Championship title with two races to spare. A rookie test was held following the race, in which Formula 2 driver Gabriele Minì topped the timesheets of both sessions driving for Nissan.

Evans secured pole position for the first race of the season-ending double-header in London by defeating de Vries in the final qualifying duel. He led away at the start, but an early collision between Mortara and Günther brought out the safety car. Evans controlled the restart but lost ground when delaying his first attack mode, slipping behind de Vries and Wehrlein before dropping further during the pit boost cycle. Nick Cassidy, starting fifth, activated his pit boost early and cycled forward as the stops played out, then used attack mode on lap 27 to sweep past de Vries on the start/finish straight. Evans’ race unravelled when Ticktum spun him around in a clash with Dennis, before the Briton himself crashed out to trigger a second safety car. Cassidy controlled the final restart to claim a second consecutive victory ahead of de Vries and Wehrlein. With Nato the only Nissan-powered car to finish inside the top ten, Porsche was able to extend its advantage in the World Teams’ and Manufacturers’ Championships.

Ticktum took pole position for the season final, but a grid penalty from the previous race meant Cassidy started first. He held the lead off the line, while Evans climbed to third and soon passed Günther for second. De Vries then attacked Günther as well, moving into podium contention, before Rowland surged forward and briefly took third. The champion’s race unraveled after contact with de Vries and a collision with Müller ended his day and brought out the safety car. Cassidy maintained control on the restart, while Evans moved into second but was handed a penalty for speeding under full course yellow. With his teammate running ahead of him, an orchestrated swap could have allowed Evans to negate his penalty, but he was ordered to hold position. Cassidy stretched clear to win, with de Vries and Buemi joining him on the podium and Evans relegated to fifth. The result sealed Porsche’s win in both the Teams’ and Manufacturers’ Championships, while Cassidy was able to take the runner-up spot in the drivers’ standings.

The 2024–25 Formula E season combined close on-track racing with wider developments in the championship’s technical and organisational direction. The introduction of the Gen3Evo car armed with a four-wheel drive suddenly saw the attack mode able to completely turn races on their heads. That coupled with the new quick-charging pitstops saw some media criticize the series for trying to fit too many strategic elements into rather short races. Still, champion Rowland used chaos to perfection to all but decide the title in the first half of the season, collecting four wins and three further podiums before being able to coast to the finish in the latter parts. Cassidy finishing runner-up was an outcome nobody would have predicted after Jaguar’s atrocious form in the first half of the season that saw them collect only 52 points in the first eight rounds. Off track, the departure of the McLaren team and its failure to find a buyer for its assets and licence saw doubts arise over the championship’s long-term future amid a struggling automotive industry.

== Results and standings ==
=== E-Prix ===
Round	E-Prix	Pole position	Fastest lap	Winning driver	Winning team	Winning manufacturer	Report
1	(Brazil) São Paulo	(Germany) Pascal Wehrlein	(Germany) David Beckmann (Note: David Beckmann set the fastest lap, but did not finish in the top 10, so was ineligible to be the point-scorer for the fastest lap. António Félix da Costa was the point-scorer instead for setting the fastest lap of those finishing in the top 10.)	(New Zealand) Mitch Evans	(United Kingdom) Jaguar TCS Racing	(United Kingdom) Jaguar	Report
2	Mexico City	(Germany) Pascal Wehrlein	(Switzerland) Sébastien Buemi (Note: Sébastien Buemi set the fastest lap, but did not finish in the top 10, so was ineligible to be the point-scorer for the fastest lap. Jake Dennis was the point-scorer instead for setting the fastest lap of those finishing in the top 10.)	(United Kingdom) Oliver Rowland	(Japan) Nissan Formula E Team	(Japan) Nissan	Report
3	(Saudi Arabia) Jeddah	(Germany) Maximilian Günther	(Germany) Maximilian Günther	(Germany) Maximilian Günther	(United States) DS Penske	(Netherlands) Stellantis	Report
4	(Saudi Arabia) Jeddah	(United Kingdom) Taylor Barnard	(United Kingdom) Sam Bird (Note: Sam Bird set the fastest lap, but did not finish in the top 10, so was ineligible to be the point-scorer for the fastest lap. Jake Hughes was the point-scorer instead for setting the fastest lap of those finishing in the top 10.)	(United Kingdom) Oliver Rowland	(Japan) Nissan Formula E Team	(Japan) Nissan	Report
5	(United States) Miami	(France) Norman Nato	(Germany) Pascal Wehrlein	(Germany) Pascal Wehrlein	(Germany) TAG Heuer Porsche Formula E Team	(Germany) Porsche	Report
6	Monaco	(United Kingdom) Taylor Barnard	(New Zealand) Nick Cassidy (Note: Nick Cassidy set the fastest lap, but did not finish in the top 10, so was ineligible to be the point-scorer for the fastest lap. Pascal Wehrlein was the point-scorer instead for setting the fastest lap of those finishing in the top 10.)	(United Kingdom) Oliver Rowland	(Japan) Nissan Formula E Team	(Japan) Nissan	Report
7	Monaco	(United Kingdom) Oliver Rowland	(United Kingdom) Dan Ticktum (Note: Dan Ticktum set the fastest lap, but did not finish in the top 10, so was ineligible to be the point-scorer for the fastest lap. António Félix da Costa was the point-scorer instead for setting the fastest lap of those finishing in the top 10.)	(Switzerland) Sébastien Buemi	(United Kingdom) Envision Racing	(United Kingdom) Jaguar	Report
8	(Japan) Tokyo	(United Kingdom) Oliver Rowland (Note: Qualifying for round 8 was cancelled due to adverse weather conditions. The results of the second free practice session formed the grid, awarding Rowland pole position; he did not receive the three points for pole position.)	(New Zealand) Nick Cassidy	(Belgium) Stoffel Vandoorne	(Monaco) Maserati MSG Racing	(Netherlands) Stellantis	Report
9	(Japan) Tokyo	(United Kingdom) Oliver Rowland	(United Kingdom) Sam Bird	(United Kingdom) Oliver Rowland	(Japan) Nissan Formula E Team	(Japan) Nissan	Report
10	(China) Shanghai	(Germany) Maximilian Günther	(New Zealand) Nick Cassidy (Note: Nick Cassidy set the fastest lap, but did not finish in the top 10, so was ineligible to be the point-scorer for the fastest lap. Taylor Barnard was the point-scorer instead for setting the fastest lap of those finishing in the top 10.)	(Germany) Maximilian Günther	(United States) DS Penske	(Netherlands) Stellantis	Report
11	(China) Shanghai	(New Zealand) Nick Cassidy (Note: Qualifying for round 11 was shortened due to adverse weather conditions. The duels were cancelled, and the group stages were used to set the grid, awarding Cassidy pole position; as it wasn't a complete qualifying session he did not receive the three points for pole position.)	(Germany) Pascal Wehrlein	(New Zealand) Nick Cassidy	(United Kingdom) Jaguar TCS Racing	(United Kingdom) Jaguar	Report
12	(Indonesia) Jakarta	(United Kingdom) Jake Dennis	(France) Norman Nato (Note: Norman Nato set the fastest lap, but did not finish in the top 10, so was ineligible to be the point-scorer for the fastest lap. Sébastien Buemi was the point-scorer instead for setting the fastest lap of those finishing in the top 10.)	(United Kingdom) Dan Ticktum	(United States) Cupra Kiro	(Germany) Porsche	Report
13	(Germany) Berlin	(New Zealand) Mitch Evans (Note: Qualifying for round 13 was shortened due to adverse weather conditions. The duels were cancelled, and the group stages were used to set the grid, awarding Evans pole position; as it wasn't a complete qualifying session he did not receive the three points for pole position.)	(Germany) Pascal Wehrlein	(New Zealand) Mitch Evans	(United Kingdom) Jaguar TCS Racing	(United Kingdom) Jaguar	Report
14	(Germany) Berlin	(Germany) Pascal Wehrlein	(New Zealand) Nick Cassidy	(New Zealand) Nick Cassidy	(United Kingdom) Jaguar TCS Racing	(United Kingdom) Jaguar	Report
15	(United Kingdom) London	(New Zealand) Mitch Evans	(United Kingdom) Taylor Barnard (Note: Taylor Barnard set the fastest lap, but did not finish in the top 10, so was ineligible to be the point-scorer for the fastest lap. Pascal Wehrlein was the point-scorer instead for setting the fastest lap of those finishing in the top 10.)	(New Zealand) Nick Cassidy	(United Kingdom) Jaguar TCS Racing	(United Kingdom) Jaguar	Report
16	(United Kingdom) London	(United Kingdom) Dan Ticktum (Note: Dan Ticktum took pole position and the three points associated with it after setting the fastest time in qualifying. Nick Cassidy started the race from first place as Ticktum served a 5-place grid penalty for causing a collision at the previous race in London.)	(New Zealand) Nick Cassidy	(New Zealand) Nick Cassidy	(United Kingdom) Jaguar TCS Racing	(United Kingdom) Jaguar	Report

=== Drivers' Championship ===
Points were awarded using the following structure:

Position	1st	2nd	3rd	4th	5th	6th	7th	8th	9th	10th	Pole	FL
Points	25	18	15	12	10	8	6	4	2	1	3	1

Pos.	Driver	SAO (Brazil)	MEX (Mexico)	JED (Saudi Arabia)		MIA (United States)	MCO (Monaco)		TKO (Japan)		SHA (China)		JAK (Indonesia)	BER (Germany)		LDN (United Kingdom)		Pts
1	(United Kingdom) Oliver Rowland	14	1	2	1	10	1	**2**	**2**	**1**	5	13	10	Ret	4	11	Ret	184
2	(New Zealand) Nick Cassidy	15	12	11	5	15	18	3	10	7	21	**1**	6	5	1	1	1	153
3	(Germany) Pascal Wehrlein	**Ret**	**3**	15	8	1	6	7	13	2	12	2	11	2	**15**	3	8	145
4	(United Kingdom) Taylor Barnard	3	14	3	**2**	20	**15**	16	3	Ret	3	10	7	4	6	13	Ret	112
5	(Portugal) António Félix da Costa	2	2	9	Ret	3	Ret	4	7	Ret	13	3	5	10	8	14	6	111
6	(France) Jean-Éric Vergne	9	5	6	7	12	12	6	8	6	2	5	15	Ret	3	5	15	99
7	(United Kingdom) Jake Dennis	Ret	4	NC	4	9	3	9	DSQ	4	17	17	**17**	Ret	2	8	4	93
8	(Netherlands) Nyck de Vries	6	8	4	13	11	2	5	11	15	8	12	Ret			2	2	92
9	(Switzerland) Edoardo Mortara	5	19	7	10	5	4	12	6	12	Ret	19	2	3	11	6	Ret	88
10	(Germany) Maximilian Günther	11	6	**1**	Ret	17	10	8	Ret	10	**1**	Ret	Ret	6	Ret	Ret	7	85
11	(United Kingdom) Dan Ticktum	8	16	18	9	7	7	15	5	3	4	16	1	9	14	Ret	**14**	85
12	(Switzerland) Sébastien Buemi	7	17	12	19	13	19	1	4	9	9	18	3	7	Ret	16	3	84
13	(New Zealand) Mitch Evans	1	Ret	19	Ret	16	20	18	Ret	DNS	20	14	12	**1**	5	**10**	5	74
14	(Belgium) Stoffel Vandoorne	10	7	10	6	14	9	10	1	19	11	7	Ret	12	13	4	12	62
15	(Switzerland) Nico Müller	Ret	9	Ret	11	4	5	Ret	12	11	15	6	4	8	17	15	Ret	48
16	(United Kingdom) Jake Hughes	Ret	10	5	3	Ret	16	17	19	18	16	4	Ret	14	10	Ret	17	40
17	(Brazil) Lucas di Grassi	Ret	20	DSQ	16	2	13	Ret	17	5	18	9	13	18	12	17	9	32
18	(United Kingdom) Sam Bird	4	18	8	12	18	11	20	14	8	7	15	8	11	Ret	NC	Ret	31
19	(Netherlands) Robin Frijns	DNS	11	13	14	8	8	11	9	16	10	8	9	13	Ret	7	13	23
20	(France) Norman Nato	13	13	17	15	**6**	14	13	15	17	6	21	14			9	11	21
21	(Brazil) Felipe Drugovich													17	7			6
22	(Brazil) Sérgio Sette Câmara													15	9			2
23	(Germany) David Beckmann	NC	Ret	14	17	NC	17	19	18	13	14	20	16	Ret	16	12	10	1
24	(Barbados) Zane Maloney	12	15	16	18	19	21	14	16	14	19	11	18	16	Ret	Ret	16	0
Pos.	Driver	SAO (Brazil)	MEX (Mexico)	JED (Saudi Arabia)		MIA (United States)	MCO (Monaco)		TKO (Japan)		SHA (China)		JAK (Indonesia)	BER (Germany)		LDN (United Kingdom)		Pts

Colour	Result
Gold	Winner
Silver	Second place
Bronze	Third place
Green	Points classification
Blue	Non-points classification
Blue	Non-classified finish (NC)
Purple	Retired, not classified (Ret)
Red	Did not qualify (DNQ)
Red	Did not pre-qualify (DNPQ)
Black	Disqualified (DSQ)
White	Did not start (DNS)
White	Withdrew (WD)
White	Race cancelled (C)
Blank	Did not practice (DNP)
Blank	Did not arrive (DNA)
Blank	Excluded (EX)

**Bold** – Pole

Italics – Fastest lap

=== Teams' Championship ===
Pos.	Team	No.	SAO (Brazil)	MEX (Mexico)	JED (Saudi Arabia)		MIA (United States)	MCO (Monaco)		TKO (Japan)		SHA (China)		JAK (Indonesia)	BER (Germany)		LDN (United Kingdom)		Pts
1	(Germany) TAG Heuer Porsche Formula E Team	1	**Ret**	**3**	15	8	1	6	7	13	2	12	2	11	2	**15**	3	8	256
1	(Germany) TAG Heuer Porsche Formula E Team	13	2	2	9	Ret	3	Ret	4	7	Ret	13	3	5	10	8	14	6	256
2	(United Kingdom) Jaguar TCS Racing	9	1	Ret	19	Ret	16	20	18	Ret	DNS	20	14	12	**1**	5	**10**	5	227
2	(United Kingdom) Jaguar TCS Racing	37	15	12	11	5	15	18	3	10	7	21	**1**	6	5	1	1	1	227
3	(Japan) Nissan Formula E Team	17	13	13	17	15	**6**	14	13	15	17	6	21	14	15	9	9	11	207
3	(Japan) Nissan Formula E Team	23	14	1	2	1	10	1	**2**	**2**	**1**	5	13	10	Ret	4	11	Ret	207
4	(India) Mahindra Racing	21	6	8	4	13	11	2	5	11	15	8	12	Ret	17	7	2	2	186
4	(India) Mahindra Racing	48	5	19	7	10	5	4	12	6	12	Ret	19	2	3	11	6	Ret	186
5	(United States) DS Penske	7	11	6	**1**	Ret	17	10	8	Ret	10	**1**	Ret	Ret	6	Ret	Ret	7	184
5	(United States) DS Penske	25	9	5	6	7	12	12	6	8	6	2	5	15	Ret	3	5	15	184
6	(United Kingdom) NEOM McLaren Formula E Team	5	3	14	3	**2**	20	**15**	16	3	Ret	3	10	7	4	6	13	Ret	143
6	(United Kingdom) NEOM McLaren Formula E Team	8	4	18	8	12	18	11	20	14	8	7	15	8	11	Ret	NC	Ret	143
7	(United States) Andretti Formula E	27	Ret	4	NC	4	9	3	9	DSQ	4	17	17	**17**	Ret	2	8	4	141
7	(United States) Andretti Formula E	51	Ret	9	Ret	11	4	5	Ret	12	11	15	6	4	8	17	15	Ret	141
8	(United Kingdom) Envision Racing	4	DNS	11	13	14	8	8	11	9	16	10	8	9	13	Ret	7	13	107
8	(United Kingdom) Envision Racing	16	7	17	12	19	13	19	1	4	9	9	18	3	7	Ret	16	3	107
9	(Monaco) Maserati MSG Racing	2	10	7	10	6	14	9	10	1	19	11	7	Ret	12	13	4	12	102
9	(Monaco) Maserati MSG Racing	55	Ret	10	5	3	Ret	16	17	19	18	16	4	Ret	14	10	Ret	17	102
10	(United States) Cupra Kiro	3	NC	Ret	14	17	NC	17	19	18	13	14	20	16	Ret	16	12	10	86
10	(United States) Cupra Kiro	33	8	16	18	9	7	7	15	5	3	4	16	1	9	14	Ret	**14**	86
11	(United Kingdom) Lola Yamaha ABT Formula E Team	11	Ret	20	DSQ	16	2	13	Ret	17	5	18	9	13	18	12	17	9	32
11	(United Kingdom) Lola Yamaha ABT Formula E Team	22	12	15	16	18	19	21	14	16	14	19	11	18	16	Ret	Ret	16	32
Pos.	Team	No.	SAO (Brazil)	MEX (Mexico)	JED (Saudi Arabia)		MIA (United States)	MCO (Monaco)		TKO (Japan)		SHA (China)		JAK (Indonesia)	BER (Germany)		LDN (United Kingdom)		Pts

=== Manufacturers' Championship ===
The highest-placed two cars per powertrain manufacturer per race scored points towards that manufacturer's position in the standings. The cars that did not score any points did not appear in the standings and the points were allocated to the following Manufacturer's car eligible to score points. Points allocated for the driver obtaining the Pole Position and the Fastest Lap were not counted.

Pos.	Manufacturer	SAO (Brazil)	MEX (Mexico)	JED (Saudi Arabia)		MIA (United States)	MCO (Monaco)		TKO (Japan)		SHA (China)		JAK (Indonesia)	BER (Germany)		LDN (United Kingdom)		Pts
1	(Germany) Porsche	2	2	7	4	1	3	4	5	2	4	2	1	2	2	3	4	383
1	(Germany) Porsche	8	3	10	7	3	5	7	7	3	9	3	4	7	8	8	5	383
2	(United Kingdom) Jaguar	1	7	8	5	6	6	1	4	6	7	1	3	1	1	1	1	350
2	(United Kingdom) Jaguar	7	8	9	10	10	11	3	9	8	8	6	5	5	5	7	3	350
3	(Japan) Nissan	3	1	2	1	5	1	2	2	1	3	8	6	4	4	9	8	342
3	(Japan) Nissan	4	9	3	2	7	9	10	3	7	5	11	7	8	6	10	Ret	342
4	(Netherlands) Stellantis	9	4	1	3	9	7	6	1	5	1	4	9	6	3	4	6	274
4	(Netherlands) Stellantis	10	5	5	6	11	8	8	8	9	2	5	Ret	9	9	5	9	274
5	(India) Mahindra	5	6	4	8	4	2	5	6	10	6	10	2	3	7	2	2	213
5	(India) Mahindra	6	11	6	9	8	4	9	10	12	Ret	12	Ret	11	10	6	Ret	213
6	(United Kingdom) Lola-Yamaha	11	10	11	11	2	10	11	11	4	10	7	8	10	11	11	7	54
6	(United Kingdom) Lola-Yamaha	Ret	12	DSQ	12	12	12	Ret	12	11	11	9	10	12	Ret	Ret	10	54
Pos.	Driver	SAO (Brazil)	MEX (Mexico)	JED (Saudi Arabia)		MIA (United States)	MCO (Monaco)		TKO (Japan)		SHA (China)		JAK (Indonesia)	BER (Germany)		LDN (United Kingdom)		Pts
