= Muhammad Abdullah Malibari =

- Title: Malibari

Personal life
- Born: Muhammad Abdullah; 1931
- Died: 1991 (aged 59–60)
- Main interest(s): Arabic literature, Islamic history, sports journalism
- Occupation: Journalist, editor, writer

Muhammad Abdullah Malibari (Arabic: محمد عبد الله مليباري ) was a Saudi writer, storyteller, journalist and critic, who is considered as one of the pioneers of journalism and story in the Kingdom. Along with Fouad Angawi he founded Al Riyada (Sports), the first sports newspaper in the history of Saudi Arabia.

He was born in 1931 in Makkah and studied Islamic Law in the Islamic College, Kolkata, India in 1972, Madrasah as-Sawlatiyah and Madrasa al Falah in Makkah. His family belongs to Hadhramaut of Yemen and to Malabar of Kerala.

== Career ==
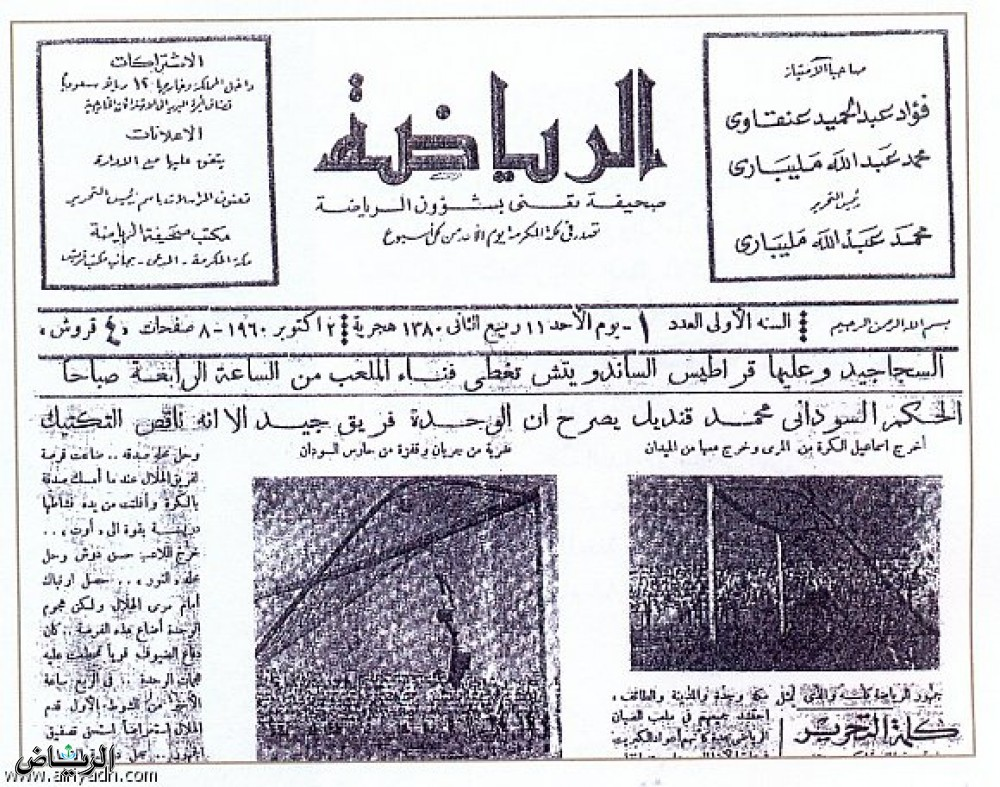
Front Page of Al Riyada Newspaper

In the beginning of his journalistic career, he worked with newspapers like Bilad, Al-Nadwa and Quraish in Saudi Arabia. Later on, along with Fouad Angawi he founded Al Riyada newspaper.

== Historiography ==
Malibari contributed with his pen and tongue over more than thirty years of his life in writing many diverse articles in Saudi newspapers and his numerous participation in cultural platforms such as literary, critical and historical lectures. He also had a large share of articles in the field of literary criticism from the Islamic point of view. Malibari was passionate about Arab and Islamic history, and in particular the history of Makkah, as he has a book titled Al-Muntaqa min Akhbar Umm Al-Qura (Selected Matters of Umm Al-Qura) in which he collected historical chapters about the region from the pre-Islamic era until the present day. These chapters contain massive information and important historical texts. He wrote another book titled Seventeen men from the companions of the Messenger of God, may God bless him and grant him peace (سبعة عشر رجلاً من أصحاب رسول الله صلى الله عليه وسلم). In it, he explained the virtues of these honorable companions, their moral traits, their good conduct and the quality of their companionship to the Messenger of Islam Muhammad, among them Abdullah bin Abbas, Abdullah bin Masoud, Abdullah bin Omar, Abdullah bin Zubair and others. He also penned a book Orientalists and Islamic Studies.

Abdul Quddus Al-Ansari, editor-in-chief of Al-Manhal magazine, said that Malibari had a book entitled "Our Great World" which was then under printing.

== Literary works ==
Malibari penned a number of stories in Arabic.

- With Luck (مع الحظ)
- And the Sun Sets (وغربت الشمس)
- The Devil Killer (قاتلة الشيطان)
