= Jeddah ePrix =

Formula E race in Jeddah, Saudi Arabia

- Jeddah Corniche Circuit (2025)
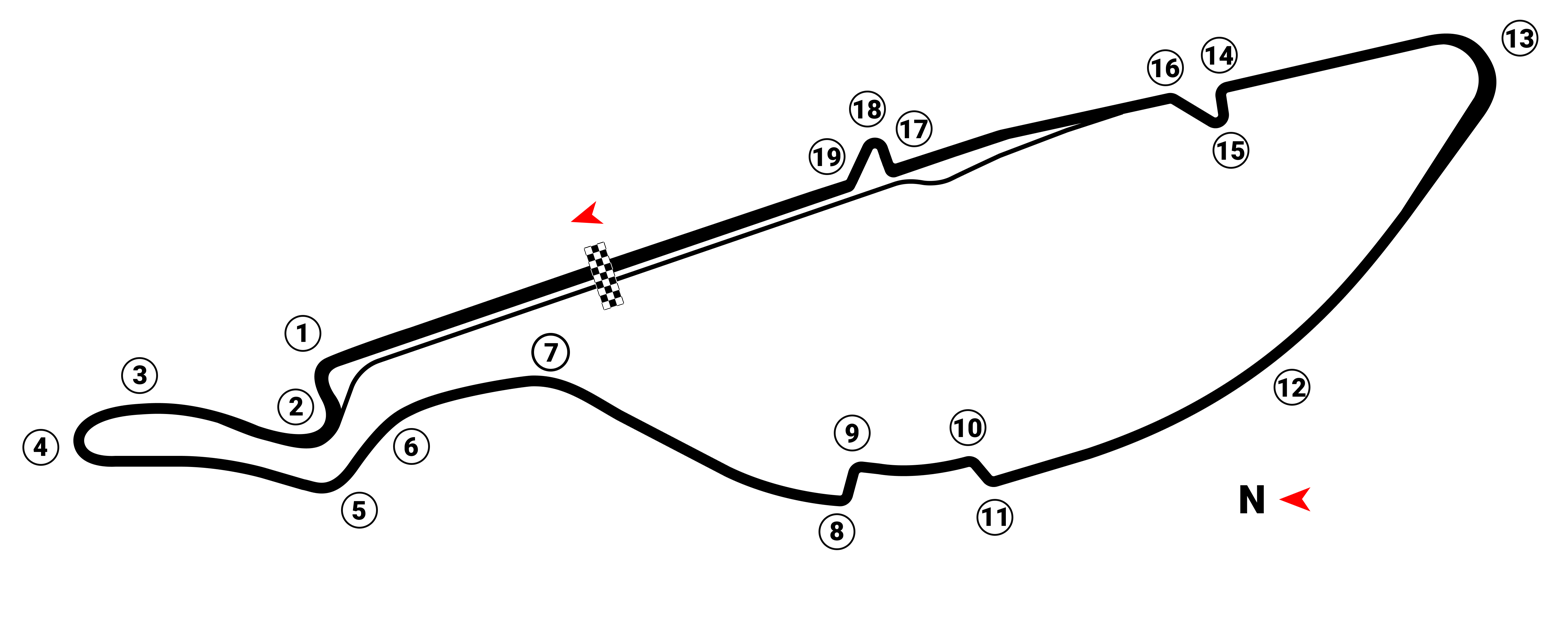

Race information
- Number of times held: 2
- First held: 2025
- Circuit length: 3.001 km (1.865 miles)
- Race length: 93.003 km (57.789 miles)
- Laps: 31

Last race (2026 (Feb))

Pole position
- (Switzerland) Edoardo Mortara; (India) Mahindra; 1:15.116

Podium
- 1. (Portugal) António Félix da Costa; (United Kingdom) Jaguar; 41:21.590; 2. (Switzerland) Sébastien Buemi; (United Kingdom) Envision-Jaguar; +2.574; 3. (United Kingdom) Oliver Rowland; (Japan) Nissan; +3.508

Fastest lap
- (United Kingdom) Jake Dennis; (United States) Andretti-Porsche; 1:15.653

The Jeddah ePrix is a race of the single-seater, electrically powered Formula E championship, held in Jeddah, Saudi Arabia. It was first held as part of the 2024–25 season.

== History ==
The Saudi Arabian round was previously held in Diriyah six times from 2018 to 2024, as the first Formula E event held in the Middle East. In September 2024, it was confirmed that the race would be moved to Jeddah in 2025.

== Circuit ==
The race was held at the Jeddah Corniche Circuit in Jeddah, the same venue used by the Saudi Arabian Grand Prix in Formula One. The track layout for the Formula E ePrix was shortened to 3.001 km (1.865 mi), with the addition of a hairpin connecting Turn 3 to Turn 22 on the F1 layout, and four chicanes placed on the front and back straightaways.

== Results ==
Edition		Track	Winner	Second	Third	Pole position	Fastest lap
2025	Race 1	Jeddah Corniche Circuit	(Germany) Maximilian Günther	(United Kingdom) Oliver Rowland	(United Kingdom) Taylor Barnard	(Germany) Maximilian Günther	(Germany) Maximilian Günther
2025	Race 2	Jeddah Corniche Circuit	(United Kingdom) Oliver Rowland	(United Kingdom) Taylor Barnard	(United Kingdom) Jake Hughes	(United Kingdom) Taylor Barnard	(United Kingdom) Sam Bird
2026 (Feb)	Race 1	Jeddah Corniche Circuit	(Germany) Pascal Wehrlein	(Switzerland) Edoardo Mortara	(New Zealand) Mitch Evans	(Switzerland) Edoardo Mortara	(United Kingdom) Dan Ticktum
2026 (Feb)	Race 2	Jeddah Corniche Circuit	(Portugal) António Félix da Costa	(Switzerland) Sébastien Buemi	(United Kingdom) Oliver Rowland	(Switzerland) Edoardo Mortara	(United Kingdom) Jake Dennis
2026 (Dec)	Race 1	Jeddah Corniche Circuit	Future race				
2026 (Dec)	Race 2	Jeddah Corniche Circuit	Future race				
