= 2024 São Paulo ePrix =

2024 São Paulo ePrix may refer to:

- 2024 São Paulo ePrix (March), the fourth race of the 2023–24 Formula E World Championship
- 2024 São Paulo ePrix (December), the opening race of the 2024–25 Formula E World Championship
