= 2026 Mexico City ePrix =

Race 2 of 17 of the 2025–26 Formula E season
← Previous race	Next race →

Race details
- Date: 10 January 2026
- Official name: 2026 Hankook Mexico City E-Prix
- Location: Autódromo Hermanos Rodríguez, Mexico City
- Course: Permanent racing facility
- Course length: 2.606 km (1.619 mi)
- Scheduled distance: 36 laps, 93.816 km (58.295 mi)

Pole position
Driver	(Switzerland) Sébastien Buemi	Envision Racing
- Time: 1:05.249

Fastest lap
Driver	(United Kingdom) Jake Dennis	Andretti-Porsche
- Time: 1:07.474

Podium
First	(New Zealand) Nick Cassidy	Citroën
Second	(Switzerland) Edoardo Mortara	Mahindra
Third	(United Kingdom) Oliver Rowland	Nissan

The 2026 Mexico City ePrix, known for sponsorship reasons as the 2026 Hankook Mexico City E-Prix was a Formula E electric car race held at the Autódromo Hermanos Rodríguez in Mexico City on 10 January 2026. It was the second round of the 2025–26 Formula E season and the tenth edition of the event.

Nick Cassidy won the race, with Edoardo Mortara and Oliver Rowland completing the podium.

== Background ==
Following the first round in São Paulo, Jake Dennis led the championship with 25 points. Oliver Rowland was second, 6 points behind, and Nick Cassidy was third, 10 points behind.

The track layout has changed as the chicane after turn 8 was removed.

== Classification ==
(All times in CST)

=== Qualification ===
Qualifying took place at 9:40 AM on 10 January.

Group draw
Group A	(United Kingdom); DEN	(New Zealand); CAS	(Switzerland); MUE	(Sweden); ERI	(Netherlands); DEV	(Portugal); DAC	(United Kingdom); BAR	(France); NAT	(France); JEV	(Switzerland); MOR
Group B	(United Kingdom); ROW	(Germany); WEH	(Germany); GUE	(Switzerland); BUE	(Barbados); MAL	(Brazil); DRU	(New Zealand); EVA	(Spain); MAR	(Brazil); DIG	(United Kingdom); TIC

==== Qualifying duels ====
Quarter-finals
A2	(Switzerland) Nico Müller
A3	(United Kingdom) Taylor Barnard
A1	(United Kingdom) Jake Dennis
A4	(Switzerland) Edoardo Mortara
B2	(United Kingdom) Dan Ticktum
B3	(New Zealand) Mitch Evans
B1	(Switzerland) Sébastien Buemi
B4	(United Kingdom) Oliver Rowland

Semi-finals
(United Kingdom) Taylor Barnard
(Switzerland) Edoardo Mortara
(New Zealand) Mitch Evans
(Switzerland) Sébastien Buemi

Final
(United Kingdom) Taylor Barnard
(Switzerland) Sébastien Buemi

==== Overall classification ====
Pos.	No.	Driver	Team	A	B	QF	SF	F	Grid
1	16	(Switzerland) Sébastien Buemi	Envision-Jaguar	—N/a	1:06.328	1:05.110	1:05.167	1:05.249	1
2	77	(United Kingdom) Taylor Barnard	DS Penske	1:06.591	—N/a	1:05.075	1:05.049	No Time	2
3	48	(Switzerland) Edoardo Mortara	Mahindra	1:06.611	—N/a	1:05.145	1:05.070	—N/a	3
4	9	(New Zealand) Mitch Evans	Jaguar	—N/a	1:06.613	1:05.149	1:05.314	—N/a	4
5	51	(Switzerland) Nico Müller	Porsche	1:06.530	—N/a	1:05.212	—N/a	—N/a	5
6	33	(United Kingdom) Dan Ticktum	Cupra Kiro-Porsche	—N/a	1:06.538	1:05.223	—N/a	—N/a	6
7	27	(United Kingdom) Jake Dennis	Andretti-Porsche	1:06.492	—N/a	1:05.234	—N/a	—N/a	7
8	1	(United Kingdom) Oliver Rowland	Nissan	—N/a	1:06.648	1:05.246	—N/a	—N/a	8
9	7	(Germany) Maximilian Günther	DS Penske	—N/a	1:06.758	—N/a	—N/a	—N/a	9
10	13	(Portugal) António Félix da Costa	Jaguar	1:06.623	—N/a	—N/a	—N/a	—N/a	10
11	94	(Germany) Pascal Wehrlein	Porsche	—N/a	1:06.778	—N/a	—N/a	—N/a	11
12	23	(France) Norman Nato	Nissan	1:06.638	—N/a	—N/a	—N/a	—N/a	12
13	11	(Brazil) Lucas di Grassi	Lola Yamaha ABT	—N/a	1:06.798	—N/a	—N/a	—N/a	13
14	37	(New Zealand) Nick Cassidy	Citroën	1:06.813	—N/a	—N/a	—N/a	—N/a	14
15	28	(Brazil) Felipe Drugovich	Andretti-Porsche	—N/a	1:06.834	—N/a	—N/a	—N/a	15
16	25	(France) Jean-Éric Vergne	Citroën	1:06.949	—N/a	—N/a	—N/a	—N/a	16
17	22	(Barbados) Zane Maloney	Lola Yamaha ABT	—N/a	1:07.104	—N/a	—N/a	—N/a	17
18	14	(Sweden) Joel Eriksson	Envision-Jaguar	1:06.953	—N/a	—N/a	—N/a	—N/a	18
19	3	(Spain) Pepe Martí	Cupra Kiro-Porsche	—N/a	1:07.391	—N/a	—N/a	—N/a	19
20	21	(Netherlands) Nyck de Vries	Mahindra	1:07.043	—N/a	—N/a	—N/a	—N/a	20

=== Race ===
The race started at 2:05 PM on 10 January.

Pos.	No.	Driver	Team	Laps	Time/Retired	Grid	Points
1	37	(New Zealand) Nick Cassidy	Citroën	38	49:25:393	13	25
2	48	(Switzerland) Edoardo Mortara	Mahindra	38	+0.651	3	18
3	1	(United Kingdom) Oliver Rowland	Nissan	38	+0.945	8	15
4	77	(United Kingdom) Taylor Barnard	DS Penske	38	+1.436	2	12
5	27	(United Kingdom) Jake Dennis	Andretti-Porsche	38	+1.647	7	10+1^{2}
6	94	(Germany) Pascal Wehrlein	Porsche	38	+1.936	11	8
7	3	(Spain) Pepe Martí	Cupra Kiro-Porsche	38	+3.894	20	6
8	25	(France) Jean-Éric Vergne	Citroën	38	+4.943	18	4
9	51	(Switzerland) Nico Müller	Porsche	38	+5.143	5	2
10	23	(France) Norman Nato	Nissan	38	+5.843	12	1
11	9	(New Zealand) Mitch Evans	Jaguar	38	+6.168	4	
12	7	(Germany) Maximilian Günther	DS Penske	38	+9.113	9	
13	11	(Brazil) Lucas di Grassi	Lola Yamaha ABT	38	+10.370	16	
14	14	(Sweden) Joel Eriksson	Envision-Jaguar	38	+10.614	15	
15	28	(Brazil) Felipe Drugovich	Andretti-Porsche	38	+13.200	17	
16	22	(Barbados) Zane Maloney	Lola Yamaha ABT	38	+27.458	14	
17	16	(Switzerland) Sébastien Buemi	Envision-Jaguar	38	+1:00.202	1	0+3^{1}
DNF	33	(United Kingdom) Dan Ticktum	Cupra Kiro-Porsche	25		6	
DNF	13	(Portugal) António Félix da Costa	Jaguar	25		10	
DNF	21	(Netherlands) Nyck de Vries	Mahindra	16		19	

Notes:

- ^1 – Pole position.
- ^2 – Fastest lap.

=== Standings after the race ===
Drivers' Championship standings

	Pos	Driver	Points
2	1	(New Zealand) Nick Cassidy	40
1	2	(United Kingdom) Jake Dennis	36
1	3	(United Kingdom) Oliver Rowland	34
	4	(Germany) Pascal Wehrlein	23
12	5	(Switzerland) Edoardo Mortara	18

Teams' Championship standings

	Pos	Team	Points
3	1	(France) Citroën	44
1	2	(United States) Andretti-Porsche	36
	3	(Japan) Nissan	35
2	4	(Germany) Porsche	35
2	5	(India) Mahindra	20

Manufacturers' Championship standings

	Pos	Manufacturer	Points
1	1	(Netherlands) Stellantis	62
1	2	(Germany) Porsche	55
	3	(Japan) Nissan	39
1	4	(India) Mahindra	22
1	5	(United Kingdom) Jaguar	19

- Notes: Only the top five positions are included for all three sets of standings.

== Notes ==
Previous race: 2025 São Paulo ePrix	FIA Formula E World Championship; 2025–26 season	Next race: 2026 Miami ePrix
Previous race: 2025 Mexico City ePrix	Mexico City ePrix	Next race: 2027 Mexico City ePrix
