= 2025 São Paulo ePrix =

Race 1 of 16 of the 2025–26 Formula E season
Next race →
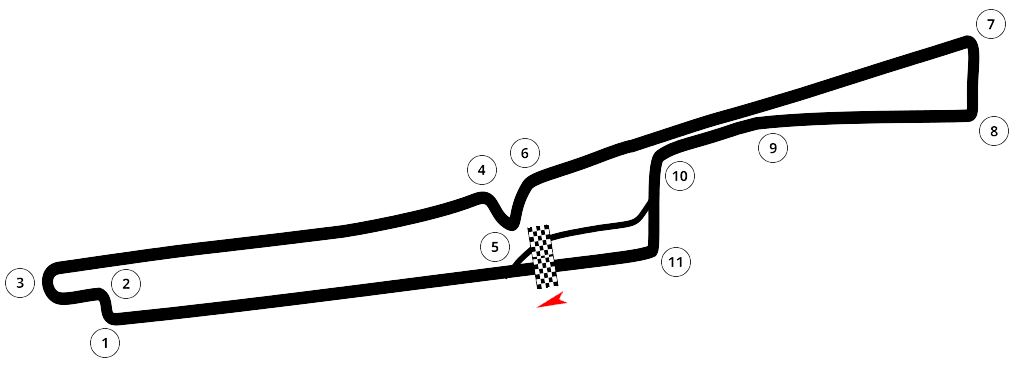

Race details
- Date: 6 December 2025
- Official name: 2025 Google Cloud São Paulo ePrix
- Location: São Paulo Street Circuit, São Paulo, Brazil
- Course: Street Circuit
- Course length: 2.933 km (1.822 mi)
- Distance: 30 laps, 87.990 km (54.674 mi)

Pole position
Driver	(Germany) Pascal Wehrlein (Note: Pascal Wehrlein took pole position after setting the fastest time in qualifying. Jake Dennis started the race from first place as Wehrlein served a 3-place grid penalty for wheelspinning in the pitlane during qualifying.)	Porsche
- Time: 1:09.812

Fastest lap
Driver	(France) Norman Nato (Note: Norman Nato set the fastest lap overall, but was not eligible for an extra point as he did not finish in the top 10. Oliver Rowland received the extra point for the fastest lap in the top 10.)	Nissan
- Time: 1:12.239

Podium
First	(United Kingdom) Jake Dennis	Andretti-Porsche
Second	(United Kingdom) Oliver Rowland	Nissan
Third	(New Zealand) Nick Cassidy	Citroën

The 2025 São Paulo ePrix (officially known as the 2025 Google Cloud São Paulo ePrix) was the first round of the 2025-26 Formula E World Championship, held on 6 December 2025. It was the fourth edition of the São Paulo ePrix. The race was held on the São Paulo Street Circuit, around the Anhembi Sambadrome.

The ePrix was won by Jake Dennis for Andretti, marking the first time a driver has won the São Paulo ePrix from pole position. Defending champion Oliver Rowland finished second while Nick Cassidy from Citroën completed the podium in the team's debut season in Formula E.

== Background ==
The race was the first ePrix of the season, and marked the full-season debut for Joel Eriksson and Felipe Drugovich, as well as Pepe Martí's overall Formula E debut. This was the first race for Citroën as a Formula E team.

== Classification ==
(All times in BRT)

=== Qualification ===
Qualification took place at 09:40 on 6 December.

Group draw
Group A	(United Kingdom); ROW	(Spain); MAR	(Germany); GUE	(Portugal); DAC	(Sweden); ERI	(Barbados); MAL	(France); JEV	(United Kingdom); DEN	(Switzerland); MOR	(Switzerland); MUE
Group B	(New Zealand); EVA	(Brazil); DIG	(Switzerland); BUE	(Netherlands); DEV	(France); NAT	(Brazil); DRU	(United Kingdom); TIC	(New Zealand); CAS	(United Kingdom); BAR	(Germany); WEH

==== Qualifying duels ====
Quarter-finals
A2	(France) Jean-Éric Vergne
A3	(Switzerland) Edoardo Mortara
A1	(Portugal) António Félix da Costa
A4	(United Kingdom) Jake Dennis
B2	(Germany) Pascal Wehrlein
B3	(Netherlands) Nyck de Vries
B1	(France) Norman Nato
B4	(United Kingdom) Dan Ticktum

Semi-finals
(Switzerland) Edoardo Mortara
(United Kingdom) Jake Dennis
(Germany) Pascal Wehrlein
(United Kingdom) Dan Ticktum

Final
(United Kingdom) Jake Dennis
(Germany) Pascal Wehrlein

==== Overall classification ====
Pos.	No.	Driver	Team	A	B	QF	SF	F	Grid
1	94	(Germany) Pascal Wehrlein	Porsche	—N/a	1:12.363	1:09.882	1:09.804	1:09.812	4 (Note: Wehrlein was given a three-place grid penalty for wheelspinning in the pit lane. He was awarded the three points for pole position.)
2	27	(United Kingdom) Jake Dennis	Andretti-Porsche	1:12.410	—N/a	1:10.218	1:10.039	1:10.114	1
3	33	(United Kingdom) Dan Ticktum	Cupra Kiro-Porsche	—N/a	1.12.535	1:10.137	1:09.878	—N/a	2
4	48	(Switzerland) Edoardo Mortara	Mahindra	1:12.352	—N/a	1:10.291	1:10.068	—N/a	3
5	21	(Netherlands) Nyck de Vries	Mahindra	—N/a	1:12.390	1:10.250	—N/a	—N/a	5
6	13	(Portugal) António Félix da Costa	Jaguar	1:12.140	—N/a	1:10.330	—N/a	—N/a	6
7	23	(France) Norman Nato	Nissan	—N/a	1:12.308	1:10.436	—N/a	—N/a	7
8	25	(France) Jean-Éric Vergne	Citroën	1:12.204	—N/a	1:10.810	—N/a	—N/a	8
9	9	(New Zealand) Mitch Evans	Jaguar	—N/a	1:12.589	—N/a	—N/a	—N/a	9
10	1	(United Kingdom) Oliver Rowland	Nissan	1:12.469	—N/a	—N/a	—N/a	—N/a	13 (Note: Rowland was given a three-place grid penalty for causing a collision during the last race of the previous season.)
11	16	(Switzerland) Sébastien Buemi	Envision-Jaguar	—N/a	1:12.716	—N/a	—N/a	—N/a	10
12	51	(Switzerland) Nico Müller	Porsche	1:12.491	—N/a	—N/a	—N/a	—N/a	11
13	77	(United Kingdom) Taylor Barnard	DS Penske	—N/a	1:12.725	—N/a	—N/a	—N/a	12
14	3	(Spain) Pepe Martí	Cupra Kiro-Porsche	1:12.765	—N/a	—N/a	—N/a	—N/a	14
15	37	(New Zealand) Nick Cassidy	Citroën	—N/a	1:12.783	—N/a	—N/a	—N/a	15
16	7	(Germany) Maximilian Günther	DS Penske	1:12.788	—N/a	—N/a	—N/a	—N/a	16
17	28	(Brazil) Felipe Drugovich	Andretti-Porsche	—N/a	1:21.680	—N/a	—N/a	—N/a	17
18	14	(Sweden) Joel Eriksson	Envision-Jaguar	1:12.823	—N/a	—N/a	—N/a	—N/a	18
19	11	(Brazil) Lucas di Grassi	Lola Yamaha ABT	—N/a	1:24.979	—N/a	—N/a	—N/a	20 (Note: di Grassi was given a three-place grid penalty for failing to slow for a red flag during qualifying.)
20	22	(Barbados) Zane Maloney	Lola Yamaha ABT	1:17.326	—N/a	—N/a	—N/a	—N/a	19

=== Race ===
The race started at 14:05 on 6 December.

Pos.	No.	Driver	Team	Laps	Time/Retired	Grid	Points
1	27	(United Kingdom) Jake Dennis	Andretti-Porsche	30	59:23.013	1	25
2	1	(United Kingdom) Oliver Rowland	Nissan	30	+1:349	13	18+1^{2}
3	37	(New Zealand) Nick Cassidy	Citroën	30	+1.876	17	15
4	94	(Germany) Pascal Wehrlein	Porsche	30	+2.449	4	12+3^{1}
5	51	(Switzerland) Nico Müller	Porsche	30	+3.775	11	10
6	7	(Germany) Maximilian Günther	DS Penske	30	+4.436	16	8
7	14	(Sweden) Joel Eriksson	Envision-Jaguar	30	+4.832	18	6
8	16	(Switzerland) Sébastien Buemi	Envision-Jaguar	30	+5.289	10	4
9	21	(Netherlands) Nyck de Vries	Mahindra	30	+5.370	5	2
10	22	(Barbados) Zane Maloney	Lola Yamaha ABT	30	+6.095	19	1
11	13	(Portugal) António Félix da Costa	Jaguar	30	+6.581	6	
12	28	(Brazil) Felipe Drugovich	Andretti-Porsche	30	+8.187^{3}	17	
13	77	(United Kingdom) Taylor Barnard	DS Penske	29	+1 lap	12	
DNF	3	(Spain) Pepe Martí	Cupra Kiro-Porsche	27	Collision	14	
DNF	25	(France) Jean-Éric Vergne	Citroën	27	Collision damage	8	
DNF	9	(New Zealand) Mitch Evans	Jaguar	26	Spun out	9	
DNF	48	(Switzerland) Edoardo Mortara	Mahindra	22	Collision damage	3	
DNF	11	(Brazil) Lucas di Grassi	Lola Yamaha ABT	22	Collision	20	
DNF	23	(France) Norman Nato	Nissan	17	Collision damage	7	
DNF	33	(United Kingdom) Dan Ticktum	Cupra Kiro-Porsche	16	Collision damage	2	

Notes:

- ^1 – Pole position.
- ^2 – Fastest lap.
- ^3 – Felipe Drugovich finished fifth on the road, but received a 5-second post-race time penalty for speeding under full-course yellow conditions.

=== Standings after the race ===
Drivers' Championship standings

Pos	Driver	Points
1	(United Kingdom) Jake Dennis	25
2	(United Kingdom) Oliver Rowland	19
3	(New Zealand) Nick Cassidy	15
4	(Germany) Pascal Wehrlein	15
5	(Switzerland) Nico Müller	10

Teams' Championship standings

Pos	Team	Points
1	(United States) Andretti-Porsche	25
2	(Germany) Porsche	25
3	(Japan) Nissan	19
4	(France) Citroën	15
5	(United Kingdom) Envision-Jaguar	10

Manufacturers' Championship standings

Pos	Manufacturer	Points
1	(Germany) Porsche	37
2	(Netherlands) Stellantis	25
3	(Japan) Nissan	18
4	(United Kingdom) Jaguar	14
5	(India) Mahindra	4

- Notes: Only the top five positions are included for all three sets of standings.

== Notes ==
Previous race: 2025 London ePrix	FIA Formula E World Championship; 2025–26 season	Next race: 2026 Mexico City ePrix
Previous race: 2024 São Paulo ePrix (December)	São Paulo ePrix	Next race: 2027 São Paulo ePrix
