= São Paulo Street Circuit =

Motor racing circuit in São Paulo, Brazil

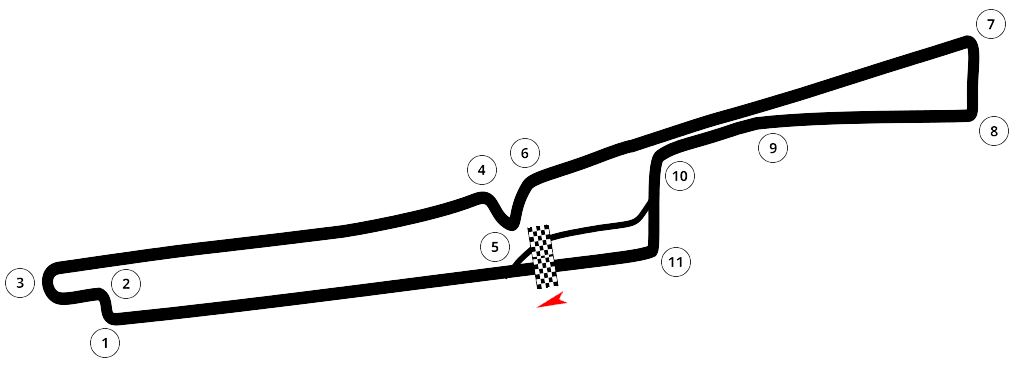
- Formula E Circuit (2023–present)

- Original IndyCar Circuit (2010–2013)
- Location: Anhembi Sambadrome, São Paulo, Brazil
- Coordinates: 23°30′59″S 46°38′50″W
- Capacity: 30,000
- FIA Grade: 3E (Note: São Paulo Street Circuit's Grade 3E license expired on 24 March 2026.)
- Opened: 14 March 2010; 16 years ago Re-opened: 24 March 2023; 3 years ago
- Closed: 5 May 2013; 13 years ago
- Former names: Circuito do Anhembi (2010–2013)
- Major events: Future: Formula E São Paulo ePrix (2023–2025, 2027); Former: IndyCar; São Paulo Indy 300 (2010–2013); Campeonato Sudamericano de GT (2011, 2013); Mercedes-Benz Grand Challenge (2013)

Formula E Circuit (2023–present)
- Length: 2.933 km (1.822 mi)
- Turns: 11
- Race lap record: 1:12.219 ( (Germany) David Beckmann, Porsche 99X Electric WCG3, 2024, F-E)

Original IndyCar Circuit (2010–2013)
- Length: 4.081 km (2.536 mi)
- Turns: 11
- Race lap record: 1:20.4364 ( (Brazil) Tony Kanaan, Dallara DW12, 2013, IndyCar)

The São Paulo Street Circuit is a street circuit in São Paulo, Brazil which hosted the São Paulo Indy 300 from 2010 to 2013, and the São Paulo ePrix since 2023.

== IndyCar ==
The street circuit race track was laid out in the Santana district. The circuit was along the Sambadrome of Anhembi and utilized portions of the Marginal Tietê service drive. The circuit hosted the São Paulo Indy 300 for four years (2010–2013).

The track was 4.081 km (2.536 mi) long and consisted of 11 turns. Even though it was a temporary circuit, it still had a permanent seating capacity of 30,000 people as it passes through the Anhembi Sambadrome.

== Formula E ==
A Formula E race was planned in 2018. However in November 2017, it was announced that the São Paulo ePrix would be postponed to the 2018–2019 Formula E season. After several postponements, the contract was finally signed on 30 April 2022 for 5 years.

The site hosted the inaugural São Paulo ePrix in 25 March 2023 as part of the 2022–23 Formula E season. The track has 2.933 km (1.822 mi) length and uses a good part of the original IndyCar circuit. The green flag is located inside the Anhembi Sambadrome.

== Winners ==
=== Formula E ===
Year	Driver	Team	Report
2023	(New Zealand) Mitch Evans	Jaguar Racing	Report
2024 (March)	(United Kingdom) Sam Bird	NEOM McLaren	Report
2024 (December)	(New Zealand) Mitch Evans	Jaguar TCS Racing	Report
2025	(United Kingdom) Jake Dennis	Andretti Formula E	Report

=== IndyCar Series ===
Year	Driver	Team	Report
2010	(Australia) Will Power	Penske Racing	Report
2011	(Australia) Will Power	Penske Racing	Report
2012	(Australia) Will Power	Penske Racing	Report
2013	(Canada) James Hinchcliffe	Andretti Autosport	Report

=== South American GT Championship ===
Year	Race	Class	Driver	Team
2011	Race 1	GT3	(Brazil) Pedro Queirolo	TNT Energy Team
2011	Race 1	GT4	(Brazil) Cristiano Frederico (Brazil) Caio Lara	ATW Racing Team
2011	Race 2	GT3	(Brazil) Pedro Queirolo	TNT Energy Team
2011	Race 2	GT4	(Brazil) Cristiano Frederico (Brazil) Caio Lara	ATW Racing Team
2013	Race 1	GT3	(Brazil) Marcelo Hahn (Brazil) Allam Khodair	Blau Motorsport
2013	Race 1	GT4	(Brazil) Eduardo Oliveira (Brazil) William Freire	M2 Competições
2013	Race 2	GT3	(Brazil) Marcelo Hahn (Brazil) Allam Khodair	Blau Motorsport
2013	Race 2	GT4	(Brazil) Walter Pinheiro (Brazil) Renan Guerra	Guerra Motorsport

== Lap records ==
As of December 2024, the fastest official lap records at the São Paulo Street Circuit are listed as:

Category	Time	Driver	Vehicle	Event
Formula E Circuit (2023–present): 2.933 km (1.822 mi)
Formula E	1:12.219	David Beckmann	Porsche 99X Electric WCG3	2024 São Paulo ePrix (December)
Original Circuit (2010–2013): 4.081 km (2.536 mi)
IndyCar	1:20.4365	Tony Kanaan	Dallara DW12	2013 São Paulo Indy 300
GT3	1:34.402	Allam Khodair	Lamborghini Gallardo LP600+ GT3	2013 São Paulo Campeonato Sudamericano de GT round
Ferrari Challenge	1:43.846	Cristiano Federico	Ferrari F430 Challenge	2011 São Paulo GT Brasil round
Mercedes-Benz Challenge	1:54.323	Neto De Nigris	Mercedes-Benz C250	2013 São Paulo Mercedes-Benz Grand Challenge round
