= 2011 GT Brasil season =

2011 GT Brasil

Seasons
- ← 2010 2012 →

The 2011 Itaipava GT Brasil season is the fifth season of GT Brasil. It will begin on 10 April Interlagos and end on December 18 in the same circuit after ten weekends totalling twenty races will include a support at the São Paulo Indy 300..

Matheus Stumpf and Valdeno Brito clinched championship victory in the GT3 class, winning the championship by 39 points over their closest competitors. Stumpf and Brito won seven races during the season. Second place went to Xandy Negrão and Xandinho Negrão, and third place for Rafael Derani and Claudio Ricci.

Caio Lara and Cristiano Federico won the GT4 Class, won six races during the season including sweeping the weekend at Anhembi and at second meeting to be held in Curitiba, as well as a victory at Velopark and Campo Grande.

== Rules changes and entries ==
The scoring system, which includes the fifteen finishers last year, will reward only the top ten of each race in 2011. Pirelli becomes the sole supplier of tires and for the first time in history, have pit stops for tire changes during the races of Rio de Janeiro in September and Campo Grande in October.

The category wins new cars in 2011, Corvette Z06-R GT3, Lamborghini Gallardo LP600 and Ferrari 458 Italia in GT3 and Aston Martin V8 Vantage GT4 in GT4. During the championship some cars entered in the category, Mercedes-Benz SLS AMG GT3 in GT3 and Maserati GranTurismo MC in GT4

== Entry list ==
2012 Entry List
Team	No.	Drivers	Class	Chassis	Rounds
CRT Brasil	3	(Brazil) Rafael Derani	GT3	Ferrari F430 GT3; Ferrari 458 Italia GT3	All
CRT Brasil	3	(Brazil) Cláudio Ricci	GT3	Ferrari F430 GT3; Ferrari 458 Italia GT3	All
CRT Brasil	70	(Brazil) Walter Derani	GT3	Ferrari F430 GT3	1, 6, 10
CRT Brasil	70	(Brazil) Antônio Pizzonia	GT3	Ferrari F430 GT3	1
CRT Brasil	70	(Brazil) Josué Pimenta	GT3	Ferrari F430 GT3	6
CRT Brasil	70	(Brazil) Fábio Casagrande	GT3	Ferrari F430 GT3	10
Metasa	4	(Brazil) Felipe Roso	GT4	Maserati Trofeo	4, 9
Metasa	4	(Brazil) Vinicius Roso	GT4	Maserati Trofeo	4
Metasa	4	(Brazil) Pierre Ventura	GT4	Maserati Trofeo	9
AH Competições	5	(Brazil) Paulo Bonifácio	GT3	Ford GT GT3	1–7
AH Competições	5	(Brazil) Juliano Moro	GT3	Ford GT GT3	1–2, 5–6, 8–10
AH Competições	5	(Brazil) Enrique Bernoldi	GT3	Ford GT GT3	3–4
AH Competições	5	(Brazil) Sérgio Jimenez	GT3	Ford GT GT3	7
AH Competições	5	(Brazil) Aluizio Coelho	GT3	Ford GT GT3	8–10
AH Competições	7	(Brazil) Matheus Stumpf	GT3	Ford GT GT3	All
AH Competições	7	(Brazil) Valdeno Brito	GT3	Ford GT GT3	All
AH Competições	77	(Brazil) João Adibe	GT3	Ford GT GT3	2–3, 5
AH Competições	77	(Brazil) Sérgio Jimenez	GT3	Ford GT GT3	2–3, 5
TNT Energy Team Vivo Greco	6	(Brazil) Valter Pinheiro	GT4	Ginetta G50	4–10
TNT Energy Team Vivo Greco	6	(Brazil) Leonardo Burti	GT4	Ginetta G50	7–10
TNT Energy Team Vivo Greco	17	(Brazil) Marcello Sant'Anna	GT4	Ferrari Challenge	1–3
TNT Energy Team Vivo Greco	17	(Brazil) Christian De Rey	GT4	Ferrari Challenge	1–3
TNT Energy Team Vivo Greco	21	(Brazil) Valter Rossete	GT4	Ferrari Challenge; Maserati GranTurismo MC	All
TNT Energy Team Vivo Greco	21	(Brazil) Fábio Greco	GT4	Ferrari Challenge; Maserati GranTurismo MC	All
TNT Energy Team Vivo Greco	23	(Brazil) Antonio Jorge Neto	GT4	Ferrari Challenge	9
TNT Energy Team Vivo Greco	23	(Brazil) Alexandre Zaninotto	GT4	Ferrari Challenge	9
Guerra Motorsport	6	(Brazil) Valter Pinheiro	GT4	Ginetta G50	2–3
HT Guerra	6	(Brazil) Valter Pinheiro	GT4	Maserati Trofeo	1
HT Guerra	10	(Brazil) Valter Patrocínio	GT4	Maserati Trofeo	10
HT Guerra	10	(Brazil) Demétrio Mendes	GT4	Maserati Trofeo	10
HT Guerra	27	(Brazil) João Paulo Mauro	GT4	Maserati Trofeo	2
HT Guerra	27	(Brazil) Eduardo Furlanetto	GT4	Maserati Trofeo	2
HT Guerra	78	(Brazil) Fúlvio Marote	GT4	Maserati Trofeo	2
HT Guerra	78	(Brazil) Fernando Fortes	GT4	Maserati Trofeo	2
HT Guerra	121	(Brazil) João Marcelo	GT4	Maserati Trofeo	5–6
HT Guerra	121	(Brazil) Leonardo Medrado	GT4	Maserati Trofeo	5–6
HT Guerra	155	(Brazil) Antônio de Luca	GT4	Maserati Trofeo	6, 10
HT Guerra	155	(Brazil) Samuel Melo	GT4	Maserati Trofeo	6
HT Guerra	155	(Brazil) Leandro Braghin	GT4	Maserati Trofeo	10
TNT Energy Team Scuderia 111	8	(Brazil) Claudio Dahruj	GT3	Corvette Z06-R GT3	1–4, 6
TNT Energy Team Scuderia 111	8	(Brazil) Rodrigo Sperafico	GT3	Corvette Z06-R GT3	1–4, 6
TNT Energy Team Scuderia 111	13	(Brazil) Pedro Queirolo	GT3	Corvette Z06-R GT3	1–8, 10
TNT Energy Team Scuderia 111	61	(Brazil) Fernando Croce	GT3	Corvette Z06-R GT3	8–10
TNT Energy Team Scuderia 111	61	(Brazil) Fernando Gomes Croce	GT3	Corvette Z06-R GT3	8, 10
TNT Energy Team Scuderia 111	61	(Brazil) Daniel Croce	GT3	Corvette Z06-R GT3	9
Scuderia 111	8	(Brazil) Guilherme Figueroa	GT3	Lamborghini Gallardo LP560 GT3	10
Scuderia 111	8	(Brazil) Miguel Paludo	GT3	Lamborghini Gallardo LP560 GT3	10
Scuderia 111	33	(Brazil) Bruno Garfinkel	GT3	Lamborghini Gallardo LP560 GT3; Lamborghini Gallardo LP600 GT3	All
Scuderia 111	33	(Brazil) Ricardo Maurício	GT3	Lamborghini Gallardo LP560 GT3; Lamborghini Gallardo LP600 GT3	2–10
Scuderia 111	75	(Brazil) Henrique Assunção	GT3	Lamborghini Gallardo LP560 GT3	8–10
Scuderia 111	75	(Brazil) Ronaldo Kastropil	GT3	Lamborghini Gallardo LP560 GT3	8–10
Scuderia 111	99	(Brazil) Ricardo Ricca	GT3	Lamborghini Gallardo GT3	1–3
Scuderia 111	99	(Brazil) Rafael Daniel	GT3	Lamborghini Gallardo GT3	2–3
Scuderia 111	99	(Brazil) Ricardo Ricca	GT4	Porsche 997 Cup GT4	10
Scuderia 111	99	(Brazil) Cássio Homem de Mello	GT4	Porsche 997 Cup GT4	10
A.Mattheis	9	(Brazil) Xandy Negrão	GT3	Audi R8 LMS; Lamborghini Gallardo LP600 GT3	All
A.Mattheis	9	(Brazil) Xandinho Negrão	GT3	Audi R8 LMS; Lamborghini Gallardo LP600 GT3	All
Manelão Competições	10	(Brazil) Valter Patrocínio	GT4	Maserati Trofeo	1–2, 6
Manelão Competições	10	(Brazil) Demétrio Mendes	GT4	Maserati Trofeo	1–2, 6
Manelão Competições	52	(Brazil) Elias Azevedo	GT4	Porsche 997 GT4 Cup	2
Manelão Competições	52	(Brazil) André Posses	GT4	Porsche 997 GT4 Cup	2, 5–6, 9
Ebrahim Motors	11	(Portugal) Rui Lapa	GT3	Dodge Viper Competition Coupe	10
Ebrahim Motors	11	(Spain) Azor Dueñas	GT3	Dodge Viper Competition Coupe	10
Ebrahim Motors	20	(Brazil) Wagner Ebrahim	GT3	Dodge Viper Competition Coupe; Audi R8 LMS	2–10
Ebrahim Motors	32	(Brazil) Fernando Fortes	GT3	Dodge Viper Competition Coupe	10
Ebrahim Motors	100	(Brazil) Linneu Linardi	GT3	Dodge Viper Competition Coupe	1
Ebrahim Motors	100	(Brazil) Wagner Ebrahim	GT3	Dodge Viper Competition Coupe	1
Old Boys	15	(Brazil) Eduardo Ramos	GT4	Aston Martin V8 Vantage GT4	1, 3
Old Boys	15	(Brazil) Leandro Almeida	GT4	Aston Martin V8 Vantage GT4	1, 3
Blausiegel	16	(Brazil) Marcelo Hahn	GT3	Lamborghini Gallardo LP600 GT3	All
Blausiegel	16	(Brazil) Allam Khodair	GT3	Lamborghini Gallardo LP600 GT3	All
M2 Competições	17	(Brazil) Marcello Sant'Anna	GT4	Ferrari Challenge	4–10
M2 Competições	17	(Brazil) Christian De Rey	GT4	Ferrari Challenge	4–10
M2 Competições	57	(Brazil) Sergio Laganá	GT4	Ferrari Challenge; Aston Martin V8 Vantage GT4	All
M2 Competições	57	(Brazil) Alan Hellmeister	GT4	Ferrari Challenge; Aston Martin V8 Vantage GT4	All
Sul Racing	18	(Brazil) Fernando Poeta	GT3	Lamborghini Gallardo LP560 GT3	1, 3–6, 9–10
Sul Racing	18	(Brazil) Andersom Toso	GT3	Lamborghini Gallardo LP560 GT3	1, 4
Sul Racing	18	(Brazil) Walter Derani	GT3	Lamborghini Gallardo LP560 GT3	3
Sul Racing	18	(Brazil) Carlos Steyer	GT3	Lamborghini Gallardo LP560 GT3	5
Sul Racing	18	(Brazil) Sérgio Lúcio	GT3	Lamborghini Gallardo LP560 GT3	6
Sul Racing	18	(Brazil) Vitor Genz	GT3	Lamborghini Gallardo LP560 GT3	9
Sul Racing	18	(China) Darryl O'Young	GT3	Lamborghini Gallardo LP560 GT3	10
Via Itália	19	(Brazil) Chico Longo	GT3	Ferrari 458 Italia GT3	All
Via Itália	19	(Brazil) Daniel Serra	GT3	Ferrari 458 Italia GT3	All
Mattheis AMG	22	(Brazil) Paulo Bonifácio	GT3	Mercedes-Benz SLS AMG GT3	9–10
Mattheis AMG	22	(Brazil) Sérgio Jimenez	GT3	Mercedes-Benz SLS AMG GT3	9–10
Equipe Greco	23	(Brazil) Renato Cattalini	GT3	Ferrari F430 GT3	10
Equipe Greco	23	(Brazil) Alexandre Zaninotto	GT3	Ferrari F430 GT3	10
Itaipava Racing Team CRT	30	(Brazil) Cleber Faria	GT3	Lamborghini Gallardo LP560 GT3	All
Itaipava Racing Team CRT	51	(Brazil) Otávio Mesquita	GT4	Ferrari Challenge	All
Itaipava Racing Team CRT	105	(Brazil) Vanue Faria	GT3	Lamborghini Gallardo LP560 GT3	All
Itaipava Racing Team CRT	105	(Brazil) Renan Guerra	GT3	Lamborghini Gallardo LP560 GT3	All
CKR Racing	46	(Brazil) Carlos Kray	GT3	Lamborghini Gallardo LP520 GT3	9–10
CKR Racing	46	(Brazil) Andersom Toso	GT3	Lamborghini Gallardo LP520 GT3	9–10
Crystal Racing Team CRT	55	(Brazil) João Gonçalves	GT4	Maserati Trofeo; Ginetta G50	All
Crystal Racing Team CRT	55	(Brazil) Caê Coelho	GT4	Maserati Trofeo; Ginetta G50	All
Blue Spirit Ebrahim Motors	61	(Brazil) Fernando Croce	GT3	Dodge Viper Competition Coupe	1–6
Blue Spirit Ebrahim Motors	61	(Brazil) Fernando Gomes Croce	GT3	Dodge Viper Competition Coupe	1, 3, 5
Blue Spirit Ebrahim Motors	61	(Brazil) Daniel Croce	GT3	Dodge Viper Competition Coupe	2, 4, 6
Blue Spirit Ebrahim Motors	75	(Brazil) Henrique Assunção	GT3	Dodge Viper Competition Coupe	1–6
Blue Spirit Ebrahim Motors	75	(Brazil) Ronaldo Kastropil	GT3	Dodge Viper Competition Coupe	1–2, 4–6
ATW Racing Team	72	(Brazil) Cristiano Federico	GT4	Ferrari Challenge; Aston Martin V8 Vantage GT4	All
ATW Racing Team	72	(Brazil) Caio Lara	GT4	Ferrari Challenge; Aston Martin V8 Vantage GT4	All
ATW Racing Team	73	(Brazil) Oswaldo Federico	GT4	Maserati Trofeo; Aston Martin V8 Vantage GT4	1–5, 7, 9–10
ATW Racing Team	73	(Brazil) Marcelo Lozasso	GT4	Maserati Trofeo; Aston Martin V8 Vantage GT4	1–7
ATW Racing Team	73	(Brazil) Rodrigo Navarro	GT4	Maserati Trofeo; Aston Martin V8 Vantage GT4	6, 10
ATW Racing Team	73	(Brazil) José Larriera	GT4	Maserati Trofeo; Aston Martin V8 Vantage GT4	9
Crystal Racing Team	81	(Brazil) Carlos Burza	GT4	Ginetta G50	All
Crystal Racing Team	81	(Brazil) Leonardo Burti	GT4	Ginetta G50	1–6
Crystal Racing Team	81	(Brazil) Rodrigo Hanashiro	GT4	Ginetta G50	7
Crystal Racing Team	81	(Brazil) Thiago Riberi	GT4	Ginetta G50	8–10
Crystal Racing Team	82	(Brazil) Marçal Melo	GT4	Ginetta G50	All
Crystal Racing Team	82	(Brazil) William Freire	GT4	Ginetta G50	All
Auto Racing	110	(Brazil) Cristiano de Almeida	GT3	Lamborghini Gallardo LP520 GT3	10
Auto Racing	110	(Brazil) Pierre Ventura	GT3	Lamborghini Gallardo LP520 GT3	10

Icon	Class
GT3	GT3 Class
GT4	GT4 Class

== Race calendar and results ==
All races were held in Brazil.

Round		Circuit	Date	GT3 Winner	GT4 Winner
1	R1	Interlagos	April 9	No. 16 Blausiegel	No. 57 M2 Competições
1	R1	Interlagos	April 9	(Brazil) Marcelo Hanh (Brazil) Allam Khodair	(Brazil) Sérgio Laganá (Brazil) Allam Hellmeister
1	R2	Interlagos	10 April	No. 9 A.Mattheis	No. 21 TNT Energy Team Vivo Greco
1	R2	Interlagos	10 April	(Brazil) Xandy Negrão (Brazil) Xandinho Negrão	(Brazil) Valter Rossete (Brazil) Fábio Greco
2	R1	Anhembi	April 30	No. 13 TNT Energy Team	No. 72 ATW Racing Team
2	R1	Anhembi	April 30	(Brazil) Pedro Queirolo	(Brazil) Cristiano Frederico (Brazil) Caio Lara
2	R2	Anhembi	May 1	No. 13 TNT Energy Team Scuderia 111	No. 72 ATW Racing Team
2	R2	Anhembi	May 1	(Brazil) Pedro Queirolo	(Brazil) Cristiano Frederico (Brazil) Caio Lara
3	R1	Curitiba	May 21	No. 13 TNT Energy Team Scuderia 111	No. 82 Crystal Racing Team
3	R1	Curitiba	May 21	(Brazil) Pedro Queirolo	(Brazil) Marçal Mello (Brazil) Wiliam Freire
3	R2	Curitiba	May 22	No. 7 AH Competições	No. 82 Crystal Racing Team
3	R2	Curitiba	May 22	(Brazil) Mateus Stumpf (Brazil) Valdeno Brito	(Brazil) Marçal Mello (Brazil) Wiliam Freire
4	R1	Santa Cruz do Sul	June 25	No. 7 AH Competições	No. 51 Itaipava Racing Team CRT
4	R1	Santa Cruz do Sul	June 25	(Brazil) Mateus Stumpf (Brazil) Valdeno Brito	(Brazil) Otávio Mesquita
4	R2	Santa Cruz do Sul	June 26	No. 7 AH Competições	No. 82 Crystal Racing Team
4	R2	Santa Cruz do Sul	June 26	(Brazil) Mateus Stumpf (Brazil) Valdeno Brito	(Brazil) Marçal Mello (Brazil) Wiliam Freire
5	R1	Curitiba	July 23	No. 16 Blausiegel	No. 72 ATW Racing Team
5	R1	Curitiba	July 23	(Brazil) Marcelo Hanh (Brazil) Allam Khodair	(Brazil) Cristiano Frederico (Brazil) Caio Lara
5	R2	Curitiba	July 24	No. 20 Ebrahim Motors	No. 72 ATW Racing Team
5	R2	Curitiba	July 24	(Brazil) Wagner Ebrahim	(Brazil) Cristiano Frederico (Brazil) Caio Lara
6	R1	Interlagos	August 27	No. 7 AH Competições	No. 21 TNT Energy Team Vivo Greco
6	R1	Interlagos	August 27	(Brazil) Mateus Stumpf (Brazil) Valdeno Brito	(Brazil) Valter Rossete (Brazil) Fábio Greco
6	R2	Interlagos	August 28	No. 7 AH Competições	No. 52 Manelão Competições
6	R2	Interlagos	August 28	(Brazil) Mateus Stumpf (Brazil) Valdeno Brito	(Brazil) André Posses
7	R1	Jacarepaguá	September 10	No. 9 A.Mattheis	No. 6 TNT Energy Team Vivo Greco
7	R1	Jacarepaguá	September 10	(Brazil) Xandy Negrão (Brazil) Xandinho Negrão	(Brazil) Valter Pinheiro (Brazil) Leonardo Burti
7	R2	Jacarepaguá	September 11	No. 7 AH Competições	No. 6 TNT Energy Team Vivo Greco
7	R2	Jacarepaguá	September 11	(Brazil) Mateus Stumpf (Brazil) Valdeno Brito	(Brazil) Valter Pinheiro (Brazil) Leonardo Burti
8	R1	Campo Grande	October 22	No. 20 Ebrahim Motors	No. 72 ATW Racing Team
8	R1	Campo Grande	October 22	(Brazil) Wagner Ebrahim	(Brazil) Cristiano Frederico (Brazil) Caio Lara
8	R2	Campo Grande	October 23	No. 7 AH Competições	No. 21 TNT Energy Team Vivo Greco
8	R2	Campo Grande	October 23	(Brazil) Mateus Stumpf (Brazil) Valdeno Brito	(Brazil) Valter Rossete (Brazil) Fábio Greco
9	R1	Velopark	11 November	No. 22 Mattheis AMG	No. 72 ATW Racing Team
9	R1	Velopark	11 November	(Brazil) Paulo Bonifacio (Brazil) Sérgio Jimenez	(Brazil) Cristiano Frederico (Brazil) Caio Lara
9	R2	Velopark	12 November	No. 22 Mattheis AMG	No. 82 Crystal Racing Team
9	R2	Velopark	12 November	(Brazil) Paulo Bonifacio (Brazil) Sérgio Jimenez	(Brazil) Marçal Mello (Brazil) Wiliam Freire
10	R1	Interlagos	December 17	No. 22 Mattheis AMG	No. 17 M2 Competições
10	R1	Interlagos	December 17	(Brazil) Paulo Bonifacio (Brazil) Sérgio Jimenez	(Brazil) Marcello Sant'Anna (Brazil) Christian De Rey
10	R2	Interlagos	December 18	No. 20 Ebrahim Motors	No. 21 TNT Energy Team Vivo Greco
10	R2	Interlagos	December 18	(Brazil) Wagner Ebrahim	(Brazil) Valter Rossete (Brazil) Fábio Greco

== Championship standings ==
- Points were awarded as follows:

Pos	1	2	3	4	5	6	7	8	9	10
Race	20	17	15	13	11	9	7	5	3	1

=== Drivers' championships ===
==== GT3 ====
Pos	Driver	INT		ANH		CUR		SCS		CUR		INT		RIO		CAM		VEL		INT		Pts
1	(Brazil) Matheus Stumpf	4	2	Ret	2	15	**1**	**1**	**1**	8	2	1	1	8	1	7	1	15	**Ret**	4	3	249
1	(Brazil) Valdeno Brito	4	2	Ret	2	15	**1**	**1**	**1**	8	2	1	1	8	1	7	1	15	**Ret**	4	3	249
2	(Brazil) Xandy Negrão	9	1	6	10	DSQ	2	3	3	11	3	2	7	**1**	2	2	5	**6**	2	**16**	15	210
2	(Brazil) Xandinho Negrão	9	1	6	10	DSQ	2	3	3	11	3	2	7	**1**	2	2	5	**6**	2	**16**	15	210
3	(Brazil) Rafael Derani	11	4	4	4	7	6	5	2	2	7	7	3	5	Ret	4	6	5	5	8	Ret	189
3	(Brazil) Cláudio Ricci	11	4	4	4	7	6	5	2	2	7	7	3	5	Ret	4	6	5	5	8	Ret	189
4	(Brazil) Paulo Bonifácio	3	**8**	7	3	2	5	Ret	7	DSQ	4	3	Ret	Ret	8			1	1	1	2	187
5	(Brazil) Marcelo Hahn	**1**	10	2	Ret	6	8	4	Ret	1	8	5	2	2	Ret	Ret	2	3	11	Ret	Ret	170
5	(Brazil) Allam Khodair	**1**	10	2	Ret	6	8	4	Ret	1	8	5	2	2	Ret	Ret	2	3	11	Ret	Ret	170
6	(Brazil) Cleber Faria	5	5	9	7	4	3	2	6	7	6	8	5	6	6	8	9	DSQ	6	5	**7**	165
7	(Brazil) Chico Longo	6	23	**5**	DSQ	**3**	4	DSQ	12	**5**	Ret	**9**	Ret	7	3	**6**	3	4	4	9	Ret	137
7	(Brazil) Daniel Serra	6	23	**5**	DSQ	**3**	4	DSQ	12	**5**	Ret	**9**	Ret	7	3	**6**	3	4	4	9	Ret	137
8	(Brazil) Pedro Queirolo	Ret	DNS	1	**1**	1	7	6	9	4	9	10	**4**	10	7	5	7			Ret	Ret	135
9	(Brazil) Wagner Ebrahim	Ret	Ret	3	12	23	Ret	14	10	3	**1**	4	21	3	**Ret**	1	**Ret**	7	DNS	7	1	133
10	(Brazil) Bruno Garfinkel	10	7	10	5	24	Ret	8	4	Ret	10	24	DSQ	4	4	9	4	9	3	3	4	127
11	(Brazil) Juliano Moro	3	**8**	7	3					DSQ	4	3	Ret			3	10	2	Ret	2	6	124
12	(Brazil) Ricardo Maurício			10	5	24	Ret	8	4	Ret	10	24	DSQ	4	4	9	4	9	3	3	4	119
13	(Brazil) Vanuê Faria	8	6	8	Ret	5	Ret	9	22	6	5	6	6	9	5	Ret	8	10	Ret	6	5	111
13	(Brazil) Renan Guerra	8	6	8	Ret	5	Ret	9	22	6	5	6	6	9	5	Ret	8	10	Ret	6	5	111
14	(Brazil) Sérgio Jimenez			DNS	DNS	DSQ	Ret			9	11			Ret	8			1	1	1	2	85
15	(Brazil) Aluizio Coelho															3	10	2	Ret	2	6	59
16	(Brazil) Claudio Dahruj	2	3	Ret	Ret	DSQ	DNS	10	5			DNS	DNS									44
16	(Brazil) Rodrigo Sperafico	2	3	Ret	Ret	DSQ	DNS	10	5			DNS	DNS									44
17	(Brazil) Fernando Croce	Ret	9	12	8	9	Ret	7	8	14	Ret	11	8			Ret	Ret	17	7	13	DNS	36
18	(Brazil) Enrique Bernoldi					2	5	Ret	7													35
19	(Brazil) Henrique Assunção	23	14	13	6	8	Ret	22	13	10	Ret	12	Ret			10	11	8	8	10	9	30
20	(Brazil) Daniel Croce			12	8			7	8			11	8					17	7			29
21	(Brazil) Ronaldo Kastropil	23	14	13	6			22	13	10	Ret	12	Ret			10	11	8	8	10	9	25
22	(Brazil) Walter Derani	7	Ret			10	13					13	9							24	12	14
23	(Brazil) Antônio Pizzonia	7	Ret																			7
24	(Brazil) Fernando Gomes Croce	Ret	9			9	Ret			14	Ret					Ret	Ret			13	DNS	6
25	(Brazil) Guilherme Figueroa																			15	8	5
25	(Brazil) Miguel Paludo																			15	8	5
25	(Brazil) Fernando Poeta	12	11			10	13	15	11	Ret	12	18	10					Ret	Ret	26	Ret	5
27	(Brazil) Ricardo Ricca	15	DSQ	11	9	16	DNS															3
27	(Brazil) Rafael Daniel			11	9	16	DNS															3
28	(Brazil) João Adibe			DNS	DNS	DSQ	Ret			9	11											3
28	(Brazil) Josué Pimenta											13	9									3
29	(Brazil) Sérgio Lúcio											18	10									1
	(Brazil) Andersom Toso	12	11					15	11									Ret	Ret	14	13	0
	(Brazil) Fernando Fortes																			Ret	11	0
	(Brazil) Renato Cattalini																			12	14	0
	(Brazil) Alexandre Zaninotto																			12	14	0
	(Brazil) Fábio Casagrande																			24	12	0
	(Brazil) Carlos Steyer									Ret	12											0
	(Brazil) Carlos Kray																	Ret	Ret	14	13	0
	(Brazil) Cristiano de Almeida																			Ret	26	0
	(Brazil) Pierre Ventura																			Ret	26	0
	(Brazil) Linneu Linardi	Ret	Ret																			0
	(Brazil) Vitor Genz																	Ret	Ret			0
Guest drivers ineligible for points
	(Portugal) Rui Lapa																			11	10	0
	(Spain) Azor Dueñas																			11	10	0
	(China) Darryl O'Young																			26	Ret	0
Pos	Driver	INT		ANH		CUR		SCS		CUR		INT		RIO		CAM		VEL		INT		Pts

Colour	Result
Gold	Winner
Silver	Second place
Bronze	Third place
Green	Points classification
Blue	Non-points classification
Blue	Non-classified finish (NC)
Purple	Retired, not classified (Ret)
Red	Did not qualify (DNQ)
Red	Did not pre-qualify (DNPQ)
Black	Disqualified (DSQ)
White	Did not start (DNS)
White	Withdrew (WD)
White	Race cancelled (C)
Blank	Did not practice (DNP)
Blank	Did not arrive (DNA)
Blank	Excluded (EX)

**Bold** – Pole
Italics – Fastest Lap

Notes

The top five after the race ensures a place on the podium.

==== GT4 ====
Pos	Driver	INT		ANH		CUR		SCS		CUR		INT		RIO		CAM		VEL		INT		Pts
1	(Brazil) Cristiano Federico	17	16	14	11	20	11	12	16	12	13	16	16	13	11	11	13	11	Ret	21	21	284
1	(Brazil) Caio Lara	17	16	14	11	20	11	12	16	12	13	16	16	13	11	11	13	11	Ret	21	21	284
2	(Brazil) Valter Rossete	14	**12**	16	13	17	12	19	17	15	16	14	12	15	10	17	12	Ret	Ret	31	**16**	246
2	(Brazil) Fábio Greco	14	**12**	16	13	17	12	19	17	15	16	14	12	15	10	17	12	Ret	Ret	31	**16**	246
3	(Brazil) Sérgio Laganá	**13**	13	DNS	14	12	10	**13**	18	20	15	19	13	16	12	14	18	**21**	15	**25**	17	231
3	(Brazil) Alan Hellmeister	**13**	13	DNS	14	12	10	**13**	18	20	15	19	13	16	12	14	18	**21**	15	**25**	17	231
4	(Brazil) Otávio Mesquita	18	DSQ	15	**22**	13	**15**	11	**15**	16	17	20	15	14	14	13	16	16	14	19	Ret	218
5	(Brazil) Marçal Melo	19	19	17	15	**11**	9	17	14	21	20	22	DNS	17	Ret	DNS	14	Ret	9	20	19	191
5	(Brazil) William Freire	19	19	17	15	**11**	9	17	14	21	20	22	DNS	17	Ret	DNS	14	Ret	9	20	19	191
6	(Brazil) Marcello Sant'Anna	Ret	15	**19**	Ret	18	Ret	Ret	20	17	**14**	17	**23**	19	13	12	**17**	18	**12**	17	23	170
6	(Brazil) Christian De Rey	Ret	15	**19**	Ret	18	Ret	Ret	20	17	**14**	17	**23**	19	13	12	**17**	18	**12**	17	23	170
7	(Brazil) Valter Pinheiro	Ret	18	DNS	21	DNS	DNS	16	19	19	Ret	21	14	11	**9**	**16**	15	13	Ret	18	18	168
8	(Brazil) Leonardo Burti	20	22	22	17	14	Ret	Ret	Ret	**13**	Ret	Ret	22	11	**9**	**16**	15	13	Ret	18	18	159
9	(Brazil) Caê Coelho	21	20	Ret	19	19	14	18	21	18	Ret	**25**	18	**12**	Ret	15	Ret	14	Ret	22	Ret	112
9	(Brazil) João Gonçalves	21	20	Ret	19	19	14	18	21	18	Ret	**25**	18	**12**	Ret	15	Ret	14	Ret	22	Ret	112
10	(Brazil) Carlos Burza	20	22	22	17	14	Ret	Ret	Ret	**13**	Ret	Ret	22	Ret	15	Ret	DNS	DNS	DNS	23	22	71
11	(Brazil) André Posses			Ret	Ret					22	Ret	15	11					12	Ret			55
12	(Brazil) Oswaldo Federico	Ret	21	20	20	22	16	20	24	Ret	19			18	16			DNS	DNS	30	20	55
13	(Brazil) Marcelo Lozasso	Ret	21	20	20	22	16	20	24	Ret	19	23	17	18	16							51
14	(Brazil) Eduardo Ramos	16	17			21	DNS															29
14	(Brazil) Leandro Almeida	16	17			21	DNS															29
15	(Brazil) Rodrigo Navarro											23	17							30	20	21
16	(Brazil) Alexandre Zaninotto																	20	10			17
16	(Brazil) Antônio Jorge Neto																	20	10			17
17	(Brazil) Felipe Roso							21	23									19	13			16
18	(Brazil) Thiago Riberi															Ret	DNS	DNS	DNS	23	22	14
19	(Brazil) Valter Patrocínio	22	Ret	21	23							Ret	Ret							28	24	14
19	(Brazil) Demétrio Mendes	22	Ret	21	23							Ret	Ret							28	24	14
20	(Brazil) Pierre Ventura																	19	13			13
21	(Brazil) João Marcelo									Ret	18	DNS	19									12
21	(Brazil) Leonardo Medrado									Ret	18	DNS	19									12
22	(Brazil) João Paulo Mauro			18	16																	11
22	(Brazil) Eduardo Furlanetto			18	16																	11
23	(Brazil) Fúlvio Marote			23	18																	7
23	(Brazil) Fernando Fortes			23	18																	7
24	(Brazil) Rodrigo Hanashiro													Ret	15							7
25	(Brazil) Vinicius Roso							21	23													3
26	(Brazil) Antônio de Luca											26	20							29	25	3
27	(Brazil) Leandro Braghin																			29	25	1
28	(Brazil) Samuel Melo											26	20									1
	(Brazil) Elias Azevedo			Ret	Ret																	0
	(Brazil) José Larriera																	DNS	DNS			0
	(Brazil) Ricardo Ricca																			EX	EX	0
	(Brazil) Cássio Homem de Mello																			EX	EX	0
Pos	Driver	INT		ANH		CUR		SCS		CUR		INT		RIO		CAM		VEL		INT		Pts

Colour	Result
Gold	Winner
Silver	Second place
Bronze	Third place
Green	Points classification
Blue	Non-points classification
Blue	Non-classified finish (NC)
Purple	Retired, not classified (Ret)
Red	Did not qualify (DNQ)
Red	Did not pre-qualify (DNPQ)
Black	Disqualified (DSQ)
White	Did not start (DNS)
White	Withdrew (WD)
White	Race cancelled (C)
Blank	Did not practice (DNP)
Blank	Did not arrive (DNA)
Blank	Excluded (EX)

**Bold** – Pole
Italics – Fastest Lap

=== Teams' championships ===
==== GT3 ====
Pos	Team	INT		ANH		CUR		SCS		CUR		INT		RIO		CAM		VEL		INT		Pts
1	AH Competições	3	2	7	2	2	1	1	1	8	2	1	1	8	1	3	1	2	Ret	2	3	421
1	AH Competições	4	8	Ret	3	15	5	Ret	7	9	4	3	Ret	Ret	8	7	10	15	Ret	4	6	421
2	Itaipava Racing Team CRT	5	5	8	7	4	3	2	6	6	5	6	5	6	5	8	8	10	6	5	5	282
2	Itaipava Racing Team CRT	8	6	9	Ret	5	Ret	9	22	7	6	8	6	9	6	Ret	9	DSQ	Ret	6	7	282
3	A.Mattheis	9	1	6	10	DSQ	2	3	3	11	3	2	7	1	2	2	5	6	2	16	15	210
4	CRT Brasil	7	4	4	4	7	6	5	2	2	7	7	3	5	Ret	4	6	5	5	8	12	199
4	CRT Brasil	11	Ret									13	9							24	Ret	199
5	TNT Energy Team Scuderia 111	2	3	1	1	1	7	6	5	4	9	10	4	10	7	5	7	11	7	13	Ret	186
5	TNT Energy Team Scuderia 111	Ret	DNS	Ret	Ret	DSQ	DNS	10	9			DNS	DNS			Ret	Ret			Ret	DNS	186
6	Blausiegel	1	10	2	Ret	6	8	4	Ret	1	8	5	2	2	Ret	Ret	2	3	11	Ret	Ret	170
7	Scuderia 111	10	7	10	5	16	Ret	8	4	Ret	10	24	DSQ	4	4	9	4	8	3	3	4	147
7	Scuderia 111	15	DSQ	11	9	24	DNS									10	11	8	9	10	9	147
9	Via Itália	6	23	5	DSQ	3	4	DSQ	12	5	Ret	9	Ret	7	3	6	3	4	4	9	Ret	137
9	Ebrahim Motors	Ret	Ret	3	12	23	Ret	14	10	3	1	4	21	3	Ret	1	Ret	7	DNS	7	1	134
9	Ebrahim Motors																			11	10	134
10	Mattheis AMG																	1	1	1	2	77
11	Blue Spirit Ebrahim Motors	23	9	12	6	9	8	7	8	10	Ret	11	8							Ret	11	43
11	Blue Spirit Ebrahim Motors	Ret	14	13	8	Ret	Ret	22	13	14	Ret	12	Ret									43
12	Sul Racing	12	11			10	13	15	11	Ret	12	18	10					Ret	Ret	26	Ret	5
	Equipe Greco																			12	14	0
	CKR Racing																	Ret	Ret	14	13	0
	Auto Racing																			Ret	26	0
Pos	Team	INT		ANH		CUR		SCS		CUR		INT		RIO		CAM		VEL		INT		Pts

Colour	Result
Gold	Winner
Silver	Second place
Bronze	Third place
Green	Points classification
Blue	Non-points classification
Blue	Non-classified finish (NC)
Purple	Retired, not classified (Ret)
Red	Did not qualify (DNQ)
Red	Did not pre-qualify (DNPQ)
Black	Disqualified (DSQ)
White	Did not start (DNS)
White	Withdrew (WD)
White	Race cancelled (C)
Blank	Did not practice (DNP)
Blank	Did not arrive (DNA)
Blank	Excluded (EX)

==== GT4 ====
Pos	Team	INT		ANH		CUR		SCS		CUR		INT		RIO		CAM		VEL		INT		Pts
1	TNT Energy Team Vivo Greco	14	12	16	13	17	12	16	17	15	16	14	12	11	9	16	12	13	10	18	16	466
1	TNT Energy Team Vivo Greco	Ret	15	19	Ret	18	Ret	19	19	19	Ret	19	14	15	10	17	15	20	Ret	31	18	466
2	M2 Competições	13	13	DNS	14	12	10	13	18	17	14	17	13	16	12	12	17	18	12	17	17	371
2	M2 Competições							Ret	20	20	15	19	23	19	13	14	18	21	15	25	23	371
3	ATW Racing Team	17	16	14	11	20	11	12	16	12	13	16	16	13	11	11	13	11	Ret	21	20	354
3	ATW Racing Team	Ret	21	20	20	22	16	20	24	Ret	19	23	17	18	16			DNS	DNS	30	21	354
4	Crystal Racing Team	19	19	17	15	11	9	17	14	13	20	22	22	17	15	Ret	14	Ret	9	20	19	265
4	Crystal Racing Team	20	22	22	17	14	Ret	Ret	Ret	21	Ret	Ret	DNS	Ret	Ret	DNS	DNS	DNS	DNS	23	22	265
5	Itaipava Racing Team CRT	18	DSQ	15	22	13	15	11	15	16	17	20	15	14	14	13	16	16	14	19	Ret	218
6	Crystal Racing Team CRT	21	20	Ret	19	19	14	18	21	18	Ret	25	18	12	Ret	15	Ret	14	Ret	22	Ret	112
7	Manelão Competições	22	Ret	21	23					22	Ret	15	11					12	Ret			63
7	Manelão Competições			Ret	Ret							Ret	Ret									63
8	HT Guerra	Ret	18	18	16					Ret	18	DNS	19							28	24	60
8	HT Guerra			23	18							26	20							29	25	60
9	Old Boys	16	17			21	DNS															29
10	Metasa							21	23									19	13			26
11	Guerra Motorsport			DNS	21	DNS	DNS															1
	Scuderia 111																			EX	EX	0
Pos	Team	INT		ANH		CUR		SCS		CUR		INT		RIO		CAM		VEL		INT		Pts

Colour	Result
Gold	Winner
Silver	Second place
Bronze	Third place
Green	Points classification
Blue	Non-points classification
Blue	Non-classified finish (NC)
Purple	Retired, not classified (Ret)
Red	Did not qualify (DNQ)
Red	Did not pre-qualify (DNPQ)
Black	Disqualified (DSQ)
White	Did not start (DNS)
White	Withdrew (WD)
White	Race cancelled (C)
Blank	Did not practice (DNP)
Blank	Did not arrive (DNA)
Blank	Excluded (EX)
