= São Paulo ePrix =

Annual Formula e event in Brazil

- São Paulo Street Circuit
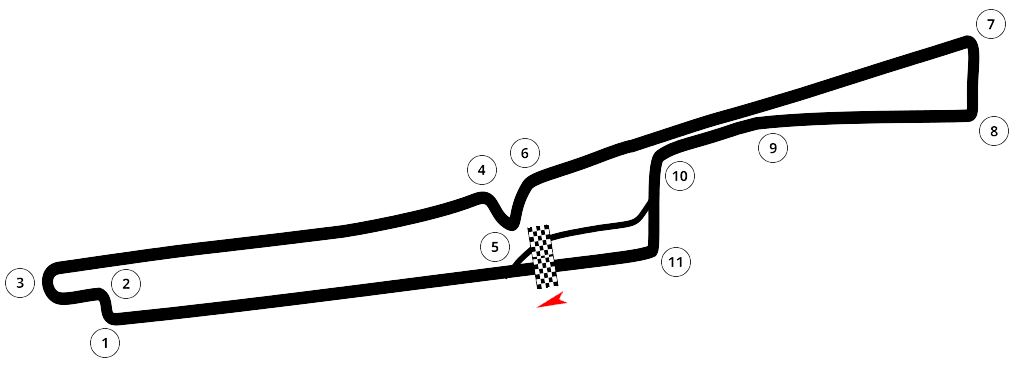

Race information
- Number of times held: 4
- First held: 2023
- Most wins (drivers): (New Zealand) Mitch Evans (2)
- Most wins (constructors): Jaguar (2)
- Circuit length: 2.933 km (1.822 miles)
- Laps: 31

Last race (2025)

Pole position
- (Germany) Pascal Wehrlein; Porsche; 1:09.812

Podium
- 1. (United Kingdom) Jake Dennis; Andretti; 59:23.013; 2. (United Kingdom) Oliver Rowland; Nissan; +1.349; 3. (New Zealand) Nick Cassidy; Citroën; +1.876

Fastest lap
- (United Kingdom) Norman Nato; Nissan; 1:12.239

The São Paulo ePrix is a race of the single-seater, electrically powered Formula E championship, held for the first time in São Paulo, Brazil on March 25, 2023.

== History ==
Back in the first season, there were plans for a Rio de Janeiro ePrix, but it didn't happen due to technical issues. Years later Lucas di Grassi planned a circuit at Ibirapuera Park, but political changes made it impossible. (Note: In his 2022 Roda Viva interview, Lucas di Grassi explains that he even drew a circuit at Marina da Glória, Rio de Janeiro and that the attempt to bring the FE to Anhembi during the João Doria government at the city of São Paulo stooped due the privatization of the area. In 2019 Nelson Piquet Jr. attempted to bring the FE to Rio de Janeiro.) In the third time there were plans to bring the FE during the 2017-2018 season, (Note: In the 2017-2018 season, São Paulo was dropped in favor of Punta del Este.) but an agreement was only reached in 2022. The agreement was reached between the São Paulo City Hall and the FE on April 30, 2022. The contract has a 5-year term, with the possibility of extending it to another 5 years. The contract was approved, and the calendar was confirmed by FIA on June 29, 2022 and was made official on October 13, 2022.

The track has 2.933 km (1.822 mi) length and use a good part of the original IndyCar circuit. From the 2024–25 season, São Paulo hosted the championship's opening round, in December 2024 and again in December 2025. For the 2026–27 season the race returns to March and is scheduled for 13 March 2027.

== Results ==
Edition	Track	Winner	Second	Third	Pole position	Fastest lap
2023	São Paulo Street Circuit	(New Zealand) Mitch Evans	(New Zealand) Nick Cassidy	(United Kingdom) Sam Bird	(Belgium) Stoffel Vandoorne	(United Kingdom) Sam Bird
2024 (March)	São Paulo Street Circuit	(United Kingdom) Sam Bird	(New Zealand) Mitch Evans	(United Kingdom) Oliver Rowland	(Germany) Pascal Wehrlein	(Switzerland) Sèbastien Buemi
2024 (December)	São Paulo Street Circuit	(New Zealand) Mitch Evans	(Portugal) António Félix da Costa	(United Kingdom) Taylor Barnard	(Germany) Pascal Wehrlein	(Germany) David Beckmann
2025	São Paulo Street Circuit	(United Kingdom) Jake Dennis	(United Kingdom) Oliver Rowland	(New Zealand) Nick Cassidy	(Germany) Pascal Wehrlein	(France) Norman Nato

== Interview ==
- "Piloto Lucas Di Grassi fala sobre as negociações para uma pista de Fórmula E no Brasil". Roda Viva (in Brazilian Portuguese). 2022-01-24. Archived from the original on 2022-01-29.
