= 2013 Campeonato Sudamericano de GT season =

2013 Campeonato Sudamericano de GT

Seasons
- ← 2012 none →

The 2013 Campeonato Sudamericano de GT season (Southamerican GT Championship) was the final season of Campeonato Sudamericano de GT replacing the Campeonato Brasileiro de GT. The season began on May 4 at São Paulo Street Circuit and ended on November 3 at Autódromo Oscar y Juan Gálvez. This year the series has a class for a mixed team of professional and amateur (GT3 Pro-Am), and a class for gentleman drivers (GT3 GTR). The Brazilian Auto Racing Confederation ranking system for drivers was utilized in determining what class each entry was eligible for. The GT4 category remained its own class.

== Entry list ==
All drivers were Brazilian-registered.

2013 Entry List
Team	No.	Drivers	Car	Rounds
GT3 Pro-Am
CRT Competições	3	Rafael Derani	Ferrari F430 GT3	1
CRT Competições	3	Cláudio Ricci	Ferrari F430 GT3	1, 3
CRT Competições	3	Henrique Assunção	Ferrari F430 GT3	3
CRT Competições	3	Rafael Derani	Ferrari 458 Italia GT3	4–5
CRT Competições	3	Cláudio Ricci	Ferrari 458 Italia GT3	4–5, 7
CRT Competições	3	David Dal Pizzol	Ferrari 458 Italia GT3	7
CRT Competições	70	Walter Derani	Ferrari F430 GT3	4
CRT Competições	70	Renan Guerra	Ferrari F430 GT3	4
CRT Competições	70	Daniel Daroz	Ferrari F430 GT3	5
CRT Competições	70	Leandro Romera	Ferrari F430 GT3	5
Scuderia 111	9	Guilherme Figueroa	Lamborghini Gallardo LP600+ GT3	6
Scuderia 111	9	Júlio Campos	Lamborghini Gallardo LP600+ GT3	6
Mundo Motorsport	15	Daniel Daroz	Lamborghini Gallardo LP560 GT3	4
Mundo Motorsport	15	Alceu Feldmann	Lamborghini Gallardo LP560 GT3	4
Blau Motorsport	16	Marcelo Hahn	Lamborghini Gallardo LP600+ GT3	All
Blau Motorsport	16	Allam Khodair	Lamborghini Gallardo LP600+ GT3	1–3, 5–7
Blau Motorsport	16	Marcos Gomes	Lamborghini Gallardo LP600+ GT3	4
Via Italia	19	Chico Longo	Ferrari 458 Italia GT3	4–6
Via Italia	19	Daniel Serra	Ferrari 458 Italia GT3	4–6
Ebrahim Motors	20	Fábio Ebrahim	Audi R8 LMS ultra	1–6
Ebrahim Motors	20	Wagner Ebrahim	Audi R8 LMS ultra	All
Ebrahim Motors	20	Felipe Tozzo	Audi R8 LMS ultra	7
Gforce	61	Fernando Croce	Corvette Z06-R GT3	1–2
Gforce	61	Júlio Campos	Corvette Z06-R GT3	1–2
Migliavacca	81	Marco Migliavacca	Lamborghini Gallardo LP560 GT3	6
Migliavacca	81	Duda Rosa	Lamborghini Gallardo LP560 GT3	6
GT3 GTR
Metasa Racing	4	Vinicius Roso	Ferrari F430 GT3	1–3, 5–7
Metasa Racing	4	Felipe Roso	Ferrari F430 GT3	1–3, 5–7
BSC Racing	10	Cristiano de Almeida	Lamborghini Gallardo LP520 GT3	All
BSC Racing	10	Pierre Ventura	Lamborghini Gallardo LP520 GT3	All
Mottin Racing	17	Ramon Mathias	Ferrari F430 GT3	3, 6–7
Mottin Racing	17	Humberto Giacomello	Ferrari F430 GT3	3, 5–7
Mottin Racing	17	Carlos Kray	Ferrari F430 GT3	5
Mottin Racing	18	Fernando Poeta	Lamborghini Gallardo LP560 GT3	1, 3–7
Mottin Racing	18	Roger Sandoval	Lamborghini Gallardo LP560 GT3	1, 3
Mottin Racing	18	Henrique Assunção	Lamborghini Gallardo LP560 GT3	4–5, 7
Mottin Racing	18	Daniel Daroz	Lamborghini Gallardo LP560 GT3	6
Mottin Racing	18	Fernando Poeta	Ferrari F430 GT3	2
Mottin Racing	18	Humberto Giacomello	Ferrari F430 GT3	2
Mundo Motorsport	15	Daniel Daroz	Lamborghini Gallardo LP560 GT3	2–3
Mundo Motorsport	15	Caê Coelho	Lamborghini Gallardo LP560 GT3	2–3
Mundo Motorsport	33	Alex Fabiano	Porsche 997 GT3 Cup S	1–6
Mundo Motorsport	33	Marçal Melo	Porsche 997 GT3 Cup S	1–6
Mundo Motorsport	33	Alex Fabiano	Ferrari F430 GT3	7
Mundo Motorsport	33	Marçal Melo	Ferrari F430 GT3	7
Gforce	61	Fernando Gomes Croce	Corvette Z06-R GT3	7
Gforce	61	Fernando Croce	Corvette Z06-R GT3	7
Cold Bras	111	Paulo Rutzen	Lamborghini Gallardo LP520 GT3	1, 3, 6
Cold Bras	111	Vilson Junior	Lamborghini Gallardo LP520 GT3	1, 3, 6–7
Cold Bras	111	Roger Sandoval	Lamborghini Gallardo LP520 GT3	7
GT4
Guerra Motorsport	6	Valter Pinheiro	Lotus Evora GT4	All
Guerra Motorsport	6	Renan Guerra	Lotus Evora GT4	1–3
Guerra Motorsport	6	Leonardo Burti	Lotus Evora GT4	4–7
Engmakers	7	Eduardo Scheer	Aston Martin V8 Vantage GT4	2
Engmakers	7	Oswaldo Scheer	Aston Martin V8 Vantage GT4	2
M2 Competições	8	Eduardo Oliveira	Ferrari Challenge	All
M2 Competições	8	William Freire	Ferrari Challenge	All
M2 Competições	57	Sergio Laganá	Aston Martin V8 Vantage GT4	All
M2 Competições	57	Alan Hellmeister	Aston Martin V8 Vantage GT4	All
Greco	21	Valter Rossete	Maserati GranTurismo MC	1–4
Greco	21	Fabio Greco	Maserati GranTurismo MC	1–4
Greco	21	Valter Rossete	Ferrari Challenge	6
Greco	21	Fabio Greco	Ferrari Challenge	6
Greco	75	Henrique Assunção	Ferrari Challenge	1–2
Greco	75	Ronaldo Kastropil	Ferrari Challenge	1
Greco	75	Hypolito Martinez	Ferrari Challenge	2
W Racing	28	Marcos Ramos	Ferrari Challenge	2
W Racing	28	Marcelo Karan	Ferrari Challenge	2
Eurobike	64	Ricardo Landi	BMW M3 GTR	4
Eurobike	64	Max Wilson	BMW M3 GTR	4

== Race calendar and results ==
All races were held in Brazil, excepting the round at Autódromo Juan y Oscar Gálvez, that was held in Argentina

Round		Circuit	Date	Pole position	GT3 winner	GT4 winner
1	R1	São Paulo Street Circuit	May 4	No. 16 Blau Motorsport	No. 16 Blau Motorsport	No. 8 M2 Competições
1	R1	São Paulo Street Circuit	May 4	Marcelo Hahn; Allam Khodair	Marcelo Hahn; Allam Khodair	Eduardo Oliveira; William Freire
1	R2	São Paulo Street Circuit	May 5	No. 16 Blau Motorsport	No. 16 Blau Motorsport	No. 6 Guerra Motorsport
1	R2	São Paulo Street Circuit	May 5	Marcelo Hahn; Allam Khodair	Marcelo Hahn; Allam Khodair	Valter Pinheiro; Renan Guerra
2	R1	Autódromo Internacional de Curitiba	June 22	No. 16 Blau Motorsport	No. 16 Blau Motorsport	No. 6 Guerra Motorsport
2	R1	Autódromo Internacional de Curitiba	June 22	Marcelo Hahn; Allam Khodair	Marcelo Hahn; Allam Khodair	Valter Pinheiro; Renan Guerra
2	R2	Autódromo Internacional de Curitiba	June 23	No. 20 Ebrahim Motors	No. 20 Ebrahim Motors	No. 6 Guerra Motorsport
2	R2	Autódromo Internacional de Curitiba	June 23	Fábio Ebrahim; Wagner Ebrahim	Fábio Ebrahim; Wagner Ebrahim	Valter Pinheiro; Renan Guerra
3	R1	Autódromo Internacional de Tarumã	July 27	No. 16 Blau Motorsport	No. 16 Blau Motorsport	No. 6 Guerra Motorsport
3	R1	Autódromo Internacional de Tarumã	July 27	Marcelo Hahn; Allam Khodair	Marcelo Hahn; Allam Khodair	Valter Pinheiro; Renan Guerra
3	R2	Autódromo Internacional de Tarumã	July 28	No. 16 Blau Motorsport	No. 16 Blau Motorsport	No. 6 Guerra Motorsport
3	R2	Autódromo Internacional de Tarumã	July 28	Marcelo Hahn; Allam Khodair	Marcelo Hahn; Allam Khodair	Valter Pinheiro; Renan Guerra
4	R1	Autódromo José Carlos Pace	August 17	No. 16 Blau Motorsport	No. 16 Blau Motorsport	No. 57 M2 Competições
4	R1	Autódromo José Carlos Pace	August 17	Marcelo Hahn; Marcos Gomes	Marcelo Hahn; Marcos Gomes	Sergio Laganá; Alan Hellmeister
4	R2	Autódromo José Carlos Pace	August 18	No. 20 Ebrahim Motors	No. 19 Via Italia	No. 57 M2 Competições
4	R2	Autódromo José Carlos Pace	August 18	Fábio Ebrahim; Wagner Ebrahim	Chico Longo; Daniel Serra	Sergio Laganá; Alan Hellmeister
5	R1	Autódromo Internacional de Curitiba	September 7	No. 16 Blau Motorsport	No. 16 Blau Motorsport	No. 6 Guerra Motorsport
5	R1	Autódromo Internacional de Curitiba	September 7	Marcelo Hahn; Allam Khodair	Marcelo Hahn; Allam Khodair	Valter Pinheiro; Leonardo Burti
5	R2	Autódromo Internacional de Curitiba	September 8	No. 20 Ebrahim Motors	No. 19 Via Italia	No. 8 M2 Competições
5	R2	Autódromo Internacional de Curitiba	September 8	Fábio Ebrahim; Wagner Ebrahim	Chico Longo; Daniel Serra	Eduardo Oliveira; William Freire
6	R1	Velopark	October 5	No. 19 Via Italia	No. 19 Via Italia	No. 57 M2 Competições
6	R1	Velopark	October 5	Chico Longo; Daniel Serra	Chico Longo; Daniel Serra	Sergio Laganá; Alan Hellmeister
6	R2	Velopark	October 6	No. 20 Ebrahim Motors	No. 16 Blau Motorsport	No. 8 M2 Competições
6	R2	Velopark	October 6	Fábio Ebrahim; Wagner Ebrahim	Marcelo Hahn; Allam Khodair	Eduardo Oliveira; William Freire
7	R1	Autódromo Oscar y Juan Gálvez	November 2	No. 16 Blau Motorsport	No. 16 Blau Motorsport	No. 8 M2 Competições
7	R1	Autódromo Oscar y Juan Gálvez	November 2	Marcelo Hahn; Allam Khodair	Marcelo Hahn; Allam Khodair	Eduardo Oliveira; William Freire
7	R2	Autódromo Oscar y Juan Gálvez	November 3	No. 20 Ebrahim Motors	No. 20 Ebrahim Motors	No. 8 M2 Competições
7	R2	Autódromo Oscar y Juan Gálvez	November 3	Felipe Tozzo; Wagner Ebrahim	Felipe Tozzo; Wagner Ebrahim	Eduardo Oliveira; William Freire

== Championship standings ==
- Points were awarded as follows:

Pos	1	2	3	4	5	6	7	8	9	10	11	12	13	14	15
Race	20	17	15	13	11	10	9	8	7	6	5	4	3	2	1

Pos	Driver	SAO		CUR		TAR		INT		CUR		VEL		ARG		Pts
GT3 Pro-Am Class
1	Marcelo Hahn	1	**1**	1	2	1	**1**	1	2	1	2	12	1	1	Ret	244
2	Allam Khodair	**1**	1	**1**	2	**1**	1			**1**	2	12	1	**1**	Ret	207
3	Wagner Ebrahim	2	2	2	1	2	2	2	4	Ret	4	4	Ret	2	1	202
4	Fábio Ebrahim	2	2	2	**1**	2	2	2	**4**	Ret	**4**	4	**Ret**			165
5	Chico Longo							Ret	1	3	1	1	2			92
5	Daniel Serra							Ret	1	3	1	**1**	2			92
5	Cláudio Ricci	3	10			3	3	Ret	Ret	2	3			Ret	Ret	92
7	Júlio Campos	11	11	4	14							2	3			75
8	Rafael Derani	3	10					Ret	Ret	2	3					62
9	Fernando Croce	11	11	4	14											43
10	Marcos Gomes							**1**	2							37
10	Felipe Tozzo													2	**1**	37
12	Guilherme Figueroa											2	3			32
13	Henrique Assunção					3	3									30
	Daniel Daroz							DNS	DNS	Ret	Ret					0
	Leandro Romera									Ret	Ret					0
	Marco Migliavacca											Ret	Ret			0
	Duda Rosa											Ret	Ret			0
	David Dal Pizzol													Ret	Ret	0
	Alceu Feldmann							DNS	DNS							0
	Walter Derani							DNS	DNS							0
	Renan Guerra							DNS	DNS							0
GT3 GTR Class
1	Cristiano de Almeida	12	9	3	3	**4**	4	5	7	5	5	5	6	Ret	Ret	212
1	Pierre Ventura	12	9	3	3	4	**4**	5	7	**5**	5	5	6	Ret	Ret	212
2	Fernando Poeta	5	8	9	10	8	12	**Ret**	8	4	6	3	4	Ret	Ret	183
3	Alex Fabiano	8	7	DNS	11	10	11	7	6	DNS	Ret	11	11	7	6	158
3	Marçal Melo	8	7	DNS	11	10	11	7	6	DNS	Ret	11	11	7	6	158
4	Humberto Giacomello			9	10	5	5			6	9	Ret	10	4	5	142
5	Roger Sandoval	5	**8**			8	12							6	3	93
6	Vinicius Roso	**DNS**	DNS	**10**	8	Ret	DNS	Ret	Ret			DSQ	**5**	3	**2**	84
6	Felipe Roso	DNS	DNS	10	**8**	Ret	DNS	Ret	Ret			DSQ	5	3	2	84
7	Vilson Junior	10	6			DNS	DNS					10	12	6	3	82
7	Ramom Mathias					5	5					Ret	10	4	5	82
9	Daniel Daroz			Ret	4	DNS	7					**3**	4			72
10	Henrique Assunção							Ret	**8**	4	**6**			**Ret**	Ret	52
11	Paulo Rutzen	10	6			DNS	DNS					10	12			50
12	Caê Coelho			Ret	4	DNS	7									32
13	Carlos Kray									6	9					30
	Fernando Gomes Croce													Ret	Ret	0
	Fernando Croce													Ret	Ret	0
GT4 Class
1	Eduardo Oliveira	4	4	8	9	11	9	6	Ret	8	7	9	7	5	4	218
1	William Freire	4	4	8	9	11	9	6	Ret	**8**	7	9	7	5	4	218
2	Valter Pinheiro	7	3	5	5	6	**6**	9	5	7	**Ret**	7	Ret	DNS	DNS	182
3	Sergio Laganá	6	Ret	7	6	7	8	3	3	Ret	8	6	**9**	Ret	**Ret**	175
3	Alan Hellmeister	**6**	Ret	7	6	**7**	8	**3**	3	Ret	8	**6**	9	**Ret**	Ret	175
4	Valter Rossete	DNS	DNS	6	7	9	10	8	9			8	8			122
4	Fabio Greco	DNS	DNS	6	7	9	10	8	9			8	8			122
5	Renan Guerra	7	3	**5**	5	6	6									115
6	Leonardo Burti							9	5	7	Ret	7	Ret	DNS	DNS	67
7	Henrique Assunção	9	**5**	11	**15**											48
8	Ronaldo Kastropil	9	5													28
9	Marcos Ramos			12	13											20
9	Marcelo Karan			12	13											20
9	Hypolito Martinez			11	15											20
11	Eduardo Scheer			Ret	12											11
11	Oswaldo Scheer			Ret	12											11
Drivers ineligible for points
	Ricardo Landi							4	**Ret**							0
	Max Wilson							4	Ret							0
Pos	Driver	SAO		CUR		TAR		INT		CUR		VEL		ARG		

Colour	Result
Gold	Winner
Silver	Second place
Bronze	Third place
Green	Points classification
Blue	Non-points classification
Blue	Non-classified finish (NC)
Purple	Retired, not classified (Ret)
Red	Did not qualify (DNQ)
Red	Did not pre-qualify (DNPQ)
Black	Disqualified (DSQ)
White	Did not start (DNS)
White	Withdrew (WD)
White	Race cancelled (C)
Blank	Did not practice (DNP)
Blank	Did not arrive (DNA)
Blank	Excluded (EX)

**Bold** – Pole
Italics – Fastest Lap
