= 2023 São Paulo ePrix =

Race 6 of 16 of the 2022–23 Formula E season
← Previous race	Next race →
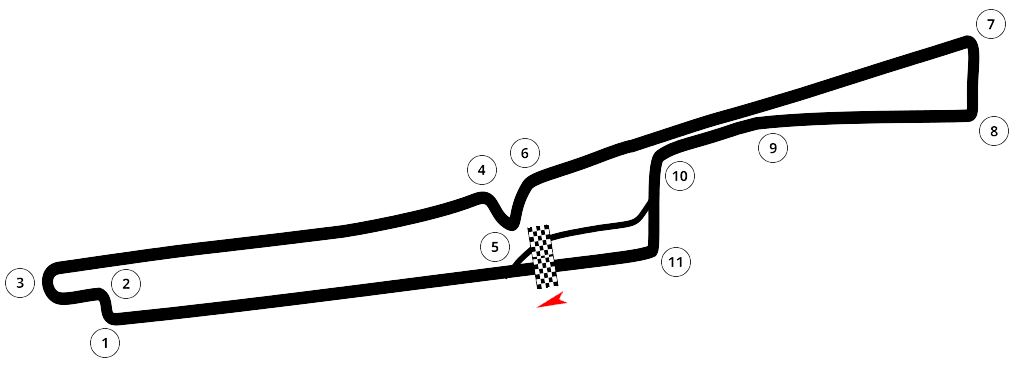

Race details
- Date: 25 March 2023
- Official name: 2023 Julius Baer São Paulo ePrix
- Location: São Paulo Street Circuit, São Paulo, Brazil
- Course: Street Circuit
- Course length: 2.933 km (1.822 mi)
- Distance: 35 (Note: 31 planned laps and 4 extra laps) laps, 102.655 km (63.787 mi)
- Scheduled distance: 31 laps, 90.923 km (56.497 mi)

Pole position
Driver	(Belgium) Stoffel Vandoorne	DS
- Time: 1:11.904

Fastest lap
Driver	(United Kingdom) Sam Bird	Jaguar
- Time: 1:13.684 on lap 30

Podium
First	(New Zealand) Mitch Evans	Jaguar
Second	(New Zealand) Nick Cassidy	Envision-Jaguar
Third	(United Kingdom) Sam Bird	Jaguar

The 2023 São Paulo ePrix was the sixth race of the 2022–23 Formula E World Championship on 25 March 2023. It was the first Formula E race held in Brazil. The race was held on the São Paulo Street Circuit, around the Anhembi Sambadrome.

== Background ==
Pascal Wehrlein entered the race as the leader in the Drivers' Championship with an 18 point lead over Jake Dennis. After missing rounds 2–5 with a wrist injury, Robin Frijns made his return to the season.

== Classification ==
(All times in BRT)

=== Qualification ===
Qualification took place at 9:40 AM on 25 March.

Group draw
Group A	(Germany) WEH	(France) JEV	(New Zealand) CAS	(Germany) RAS	(United Kingdom) HUG	(Germany) LOT	(New Zealand) EVA	(Brazil) SET	(United Kingdom) ROW	(Switzerland) MOR	(Switzerland) MUE
Group B	(United Kingdom) DEN	(Portugal) DAC	(Switzerland) BUE	(United Kingdom) BIR	(Brazil) DIG	(Belgium) VAN	(France) NAT	(United Kingdom) TIC	(France) FEN	(Germany) GUE	(Netherlands) FRI

==== Qualifying duels ====
Quarter-finals
A3	(Switzerland) Edoardo Mortara
A2	(New Zealand) Nick Cassidy
A1	(Belgium) Stoffel Vandoorne
A4	(United Kingdom) Jake Hughes
B3	(Portugal) António Félix da Costa
B2	(Germany) Maximilian Günther
B4	(New Zealand) Mitch Evans
B1	(United Kingdom) Sam Bird

Semi-finals
(Switzerland) Edoardo Mortara
(Belgium) Stoffel Vandoorne
(Portugal) António Félix da Costa
(New Zealand) Mitch Evans

Final
(Belgium) Stoffel Vandoorne
(Portugal) António Félix da Costa

==== Overall classification ====
Pos.	No.	Driver	Team	A	B	QF	SF	F	Grid
1	1	(Belgium) Stoffel Vandoorne	DS	1:12:761	—N/a	1:11:920	1:11:929	1:11:904	1
2	13	(Portugal) António Félix da Costa	Porsche	—N/a	1:12:837	1:11:982	1:11:982	1:11.967	2
3	9	(New Zealand) Mitch Evans	Jaguar	—N/a	1:12:950	1:11:843	1:12.022	—N/a	3
4	48	(Switzerland) Edoardo Mortara	Maserati	1:12:893	—N/a	1:12:132	1:12.109	—N/a	4
5	10	(United Kingdom) Sam Bird	Jaguar	—N/a	1:12:669	1:12:037	—N/a	—N/a	10 (Note: Bird received a 5-place grid penalty for causing a collision with Mitch Evans in Hyderabad.)
6	37	(New Zealand) Nick Cassidy	Envision-Jaguar	1:12:852	—N/a	1:12:150	—N/a	—N/a	5
7	7	(Germany) Maximilian Günther	Maserati	—N/a	1:12:698	1:12:189	—N/a	—N/a	9 (Note: Günther received a 3-place grid penalty for overtaking Fenestraz under double yellows in Cape Town.)
8	5	(United Kingdom) Jake Hughes	McLaren-Nissan	1:12:909	—N/a	1:12:657	—N/a	—N/a	6
9	25	(France) Jean-Éric Vergne	DS	1:13:157	—N/a	—N/a	—N/a	—N/a	7
10	17	(France) Norman Nato	Nissan	—N/a	1:12:971	—N/a	—N/a	—N/a	8
11	58	(Germany) René Rast	McLaren-Nissan	1:13:161	—N/a	—N/a	—N/a	—N/a	11
12	16	(Switzerland) Sébastien Buemi	Envision-Jaguar	—N/a	1:12:971	—N/a	—N/a	—N/a	12
13	51	(Switzerland) Nico Müller	ABT-Mahindra	1:13:200	—N/a	—N/a	—N/a	—N/a	13
14	27	(United Kingdom) Jake Dennis	Andretti-Porsche	—N/a	1:12:991	—N/a	—N/a	—N/a	14
15	94	(Germany) Pascal Wehrlein	Porsche	1:13:280	—N/a	—N/a	—N/a	—N/a	18 (Note: Wehrlein received a 3-place grid penalty for causing a collision with Buemi in Cape Town.)
16	23	(France) Sacha Fenestraz	Nissan	—N/a	1:13:040	—N/a	—N/a	—N/a	15
17	3	(Brazil) Sérgio Sette Câmara	NIO	1:13:025	—N/a	—N/a	—N/a	—N/a	16
18	33	(United Kingdom) Dan Ticktum	NIO	—N/a	1:13.045	—N/a	—N/a	—N/a	17
19	8	(United Kingdom) Oliver Rowland	Mahindra	1:13:330	—N/a	—N/a	—N/a	—N/a	19
20	4	(Netherlands) Robin Frijns	ABT-Mahindra	—N/a	1:13:671	—N/a	—N/a	—N/a	20
21	36	(Germany) André Lotterer	Andretti-Porsche	1:13:382	—N/a	—N/a	—N/a	—N/a	21
-	11	(Brazil) Lucas di Grassi	Mahindra	—N/a	1:24:491 (Note: Although di Grassi failed to set a lap within the 107% time, he was permitted to race under the stewards' discretion.)	—N/a	—N/a	—N/a	22

=== Race ===
The race took place at 2:03PM on 25 March.

Pos.	No.	Driver	Team	Laps	Time/Retired	Grid	Points
1	9	(New Zealand) Mitch Evans	Jaguar	35	53:25.536	3	25
2	37	(New Zealand) Nick Cassidy	Envision-Jaguar	35	+0.284	5	18
3	10	(United Kingdom) Sam Bird	Jaguar	35	+0.507	10	15+1^{2}
4	13	(Portugal) António Félix da Costa	Porsche	35	+3.487	2	12
5	25	(France) Jean-Éric Vergne	DS	35	+4.042	7	10
6	1	(Belgium) Stoffel Vandoorne	DS	35	+4.576	1	8+3^{1}
7	94	(Germany) Pascal Wehrlein	Porsche	35	+5.659	18	6
8	5	(United Kingdom) Jake Hughes	McLaren-Nissan	35	+6.141	6	4
9	58	(Germany) René Rast	McLaren-Nissan	35	+7.403	11	2
10	16	(Switzerland) Sébastien Buemi	Envision-Jaguar	35	+7.976	12	1
11	7	(Germany) Maximilian Günther	Maserati	35	+15.192 (Note: Günther received a 5-second time penalty for not following the race director's instructions.)	9	
12	36	(Germany) André Lotterer	Andretti-Porsche	35	+15.345	21	
13	11	(Brazil) Lucas di Grassi	Mahindra	35	+19.247	22	
14	4	(Netherlands) Robin Frijns	ABT-Mahindra	35	+20.751	20	
15	8	(United Kingdom) Oliver Rowland	Mahindra	35	+21.465	19	
16	3	(Brazil) Sérgio Sette Câmara	NIO	35	+31.514	16	
17	33	(United Kingdom) Dan Ticktum	NIO	35	+34.398 (Note: Ticktum received two penalties, totalling 20 seconds, for not following the race director's instructions and for causing a collision with Rowland and Dennis.)	17	
Ret	51	(Switzerland) Nico Müller	ABT-Mahindra	19	Collision	13	
Ret	48	(Switzerland) Edoardo Mortara	Maserati	19	Collision	4	
Ret	27	(United Kingdom) Jake Dennis	Andretti-Porsche	13	Collision	14	
Ret	23	(France) Sacha Fenestraz	Nissan	6	Accident	15	
Ret	17	(France) Norman Nato	Nissan	0	Collision	8	

Notes:

- ^1 – Pole position.
- ^2 – Fastest lap.

==== Standings after the race ====
Drivers' Championship standings

	Pos	Driver	Points
	1	(Germany) Pascal Wehrlein	86
	2	(United Kingdom) Jake Dennis	62
2	3	(New Zealand) Nick Cassidy	61
1	4	(France) Jean-Éric Vergne	60
1	5	(Portugal) António Félix da Costa	58

Teams' Championship standings

	Pos	Constructor	Points
	1	(Germany) Porsche	144
	2	(United Kingdom) Envision-Jaguar	103
3	3	(United Kingdom) Jaguar	83
1	4	(France) DS	82
2	5	(United States) Andretti-Porsche	80

- Notes: Only the top five positions are included for both sets of standings.

== Notes ==
Previous race: 2023 Cape Town ePrix	FIA Formula E World Championship; 2022–23 season	Next race: 2023 Berlin ePrix
Previous race: N/A	São Paulo ePrix	Next race: 2024 São Paulo ePrix (March)
