= 2024 São Paulo ePrix (March) =

Race 4 of 16 of the 2023–24 Formula E season
← Previous race	Next race →
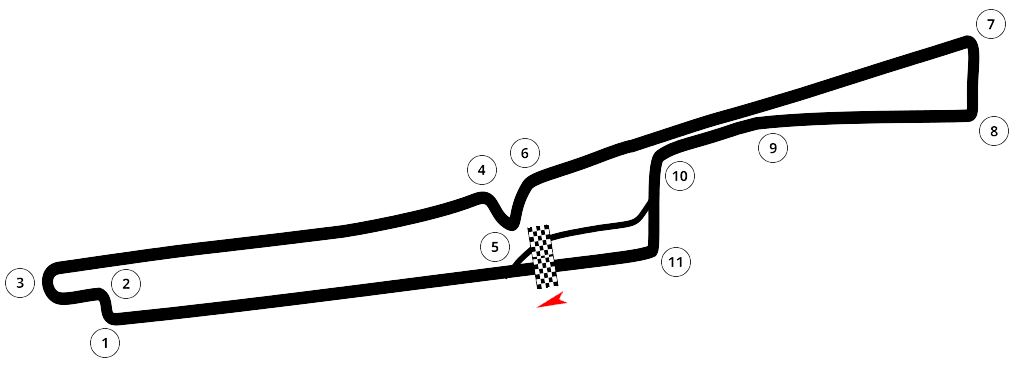

Race details
- Date: 16 March 2024
- Official name: 2024 São Paulo ePrix
- Location: São Paulo Street Circuit, São Paulo, Brazil
- Course: Street Circuit
- Course length: 2.933 km (1.822 mi)
- Distance: 34 (Note: 31 planned laps and 3 extra laps) laps, 99.722 km (61.964 mi)
- Scheduled distance: 31 laps, 90.923 km (56.497 mi)

Pole position
Driver	(Germany) Pascal Wehrlein	Porsche
- Time: 1:13.713

Fastest lap
Driver	(Netherlands) Nyck de Vries; Sébastien Buemi (Note: The point for fastest lap was awarded to Buemi, as de Vries did not finish in the top 10.)	Mahindra
- Time: 1:15.502 on lap 29

Podium
First	(United Kingdom) Sam Bird	McLaren-Nissan
Second	(New Zealand) Mitch Evans	Jaguar
Third	(United Kingdom) Oliver Rowland	Nissan

The 2024 São Paulo ePrix was the fourth race of the 2023–24 Formula E World Championship, held on 16 March 2024. It was the second edition of the São Paulo ePrix. The race was held on the São Paulo Street Circuit, around the Anhembi Sambadrome.

The ePrix was won by Sam Bird for McLaren with a dramatic final lap overtake around the outside of Jaguar driver Mitch Evans. A double overtake at the final corner for Nissan driver Oliver Rowland ensured that he completed the podium. Bird's win was his first Formula E race victory since the 2021 New York City ePrix, and the first and only ever Formula E victory for McLaren and would also be Bird's 12th and final victory in Formula E.

== Background ==
Nick Cassidy entered the race as the leader in the Drivers' Championship with a 19 point lead over Pascal Wehrlein, followed by Jean-Éric Vergne (24 points behind) and defending champion Jake Dennis (29 points behind).

Prior to the race, Jaguar held a 31 point lead over DS Penske in the Teams' Championship, with Porsche in third. The Manufacturers' Trophy was newly introduced prior to the São Paulo ePrix, with the standings backdated to the start of the season; Jaguar held a 33 point lead over Porsche in these standings, with Stellantis in third.

== Classification ==
(All times in BRT)

=== Qualification ===
Qualification took place at 09:40 on 16 March.

Group draw
Group A	(New Zealand) CAS	(Netherlands) DEV	(Brazil) DIG	(New Zealand) EVA	(Netherlands) FRI	(Switzerland) MUL	(France) NAT	(France) JEV	(United Kingdom) ROW	(Brazil) SET	(Belgium) VAN
Group B	(United Kingdom) BIR	(Switzerland) BUE	(Portugal) DAC	(India) DAR	(United Kingdom) DEN	(France) FEN	(Germany) GUE	(United Kingdom) HUG	(Switzerland) MOR	(United Kingdom) TIC	(Germany) WEH

==== Qualifying duels ====
Quarter-finals
A2	(Belgium) Stoffel Vandoorne
A3	(New Zealand) Mitch Evans
A1	(France) Jean-Éric Vergne
A4	(Switzerland) Nico Müller
B2	(Germany) Pascal Wehrlein
B3	(Switzerland) Edoardo Mortara
B1	(Germany) Maximilian Günther
B4	(United Kingdom) Sam Bird

Semi-finals
(Belgium) Stoffel Vandoorne
(France) Jean-Éric Vergne
(Germany) Pascal Wehrlein
(Germany) Maximilian Günther

Final
(Germany) Pascal Wehrlein
(Belgium) Stoffel Vandoorne

==== Overall classification ====
Pos.	No.	Driver	Team	A	B	QF	SF	F	Grid
1	94	(Germany) Pascal Wehrlein	Porsche	—N/a	1:13.713	1:12.846	1:12.764	1:12.789	1
2	2	(Belgium) Stoffel Vandoorne	DS Penske	1:13.849	—N/a	1:13.028	1:12.566	1:12.791	2
3	7	(Germany) Maximilian Günther	Maserati	—N/a	1:13.516	1:12.881	1:13.041	—N/a	22 (Note: Günther received two separate 20-place grid penalties for changing the gearbox and inverters respectively in his car.)
4	25	(France) Jean-Éric Vergne	DS Penske	1:13.731	—N/a	1:12.917	1:13.287	—N/a	3
5	9	(New Zealand) Mitch Evans	Jaguar	1:13.858	—N/a	1:13.184	—N/a	—N/a	4
6	8	(United Kingdom) Sam Bird	McLaren-Nissan	—N/a	1:13.786	1:13.208	—N/a	—N/a	5
7	48	(Switzerland) Edoardo Mortara	Mahindra	—N/a	1:13.734	1:13.368	—N/a	—N/a	6
8	51	(Switzerland) Nico Müller	ABT Cupra-Mahindra	1:13.867	—N/a	No time (Note: Müller set a fast enough time to progress from the group stage; however, he damaged his car in a collision with the wall at the end of the group stage session and did not take part in the qualifying duels. His scheduled opponent, Vergne, received a bye to the semi-finals.)	—N/a	—N/a	7
9	13	(Portugal) António Félix da Costa	Porsche	—N/a	1:13.791	—N/a	—N/a	—N/a	8
10	37	(New Zealand) Nick Cassidy	Jaguar	1:13.878	—N/a	—N/a	—N/a	—N/a	9
11	1	(United Kingdom) Jake Dennis	Andretti-Porsche	—N/a	1:13.844	—N/a	—N/a	—N/a	10
12	22	(United Kingdom) Oliver Rowland	Nissan	1:13.925	—N/a	—N/a	—N/a	—N/a	11
13	5	(United Kingdom) Jake Hughes	McLaren-Nissan	—N/a	1:13.870	—N/a	—N/a	—N/a	12
14	21	(Netherlands) Nyck de Vries	Mahindra	1:13.935	—N/a	—N/a	—N/a	—N/a	13
15	23	(France) Sacha Fenestraz	Nissan	—N/a	1:13.967	—N/a	—N/a	—N/a	14
16	11	(Brazil) Lucas di Grassi	ABT Cupra-Mahindra	1:13.962	—N/a	—N/a	—N/a	—N/a	15
17	18	(India) Jehan Daruvala	Maserati	—N/a	1:14.032	—N/a	—N/a	—N/a	16
18	4	(Netherlands) Robin Frijns	Envision-Jaguar	1:13.987	—N/a	—N/a	—N/a	—N/a	17
19	16	(Switzerland) Sébastien Buemi	Envision-Jaguar	—N/a	1:14.085	—N/a	—N/a	—N/a	18
20	3	(Brazil) Sérgio Sette Câmara	ERT	1:14.057	—N/a	—N/a	—N/a	—N/a	19
21	33	(United Kingdom) Dan Ticktum	ERT	—N/a	1:14.115	—N/a	—N/a	—N/a	20
22	17	(France) Norman Nato	Andretti-Porsche	1:14.146	—N/a	—N/a	—N/a	—N/a	21

=== Race ===
The race started at 14:03 on 16 March.

Pos.	No.	Driver	Team	Laps	Time/Retired	Grid	Points
1	8	(United Kingdom) Sam Bird	McLaren-Nissan	34	53:03.071	5	25
2	9	(New Zealand) Mitch Evans	Jaguar	34	+0.564	4	18
3	22	(United Kingdom) Oliver Rowland	Nissan	34	+3.540	11	15
4	94	(Germany) Pascal Wehrlein	Porsche	34	+3.629	1	12+3^{1}
5	1	(United Kingdom) Jake Dennis	Andretti-Porsche	34	+3.722	10	10
6	13	(Portugal) António Félix da Costa	Porsche	34	+5.567	8	8
7	25	(France) Jean-Éric Vergne	DS Penske	34	+6.006	3	6
8	2	(Belgium) Stoffel Vandoorne	DS Penske	34	+6.817	2	4
9	7	(Germany) Maximilian Günther	Maserati	34	+8.085	22	2
10	16	(Switzerland) Sébastien Buemi	Envision-Jaguar	34	+8.610	18	1+1^{2}
11	23	(France) Sacha Fenestraz	Nissan	34	+9.277	14	
12	48	(Switzerland) Edoardo Mortara	Mahindra	34	+9.762	6	
13	11	(Brazil) Lucas di Grassi	ABT Cupra-Mahindra	34	+10.819	15	
14	21	(Netherlands) Nyck de Vries	Mahindra	34	+13.677	13	
15	18	(India) Jehan Daruvala	Maserati	34	+14.379	16	
16	33	(United Kingdom) Dan Ticktum	ERT	34	+17.884	20	
17	17	(France) Norman Nato	Andretti-Porsche	34	+18.889 (Note: Nato received a 5-second time penalty after causing a collision with Lucas di Grassi.)	21	
18	4	(Netherlands) Robin Frijns	Envision-Jaguar	34	+19.124	17	
Ret	5	(United Kingdom) Jake Hughes	McLaren-Nissan	31	Retired in pits	14	
Ret	51	(Switzerland) Nico Müller	ABT Cupra-Mahindra	25	Retired in pits	7	
Ret	37	(New Zealand) Nick Cassidy	Jaguar	14	Accident	9	
DSQ	3	(Brazil) Sérgio Sette Câmara	ERT	34	Disqualified (Note: Sette Câmara was disqualified after the conclusion of the race, due to energy usage above the maximum of 38.5 kWh.)	19	

Notes:

- ^1 – Pole position.
- ^2 – Fastest lap.

=== Standings after the race ===
Drivers' Championship standings

	Pos	Driver	Points
	1	(New Zealand) Nick Cassidy	57
	2	(Germany) Pascal Wehrlein	53
2	3	(New Zealand) Mitch Evans	39
1	4	(France) Jean-Éric Vergne	39
1	5	(United Kingdom) Jake Dennis	38

Teams' Championship standings

	Pos	Team	Points
	1	(United Kingdom) Jaguar	96
1	2	(Germany) Porsche	61
1	3	(United States) DS Penske	57
2	4	(United Kingdom) McLaren	55
1	5	(United States) Andretti	47

Manufacturers' Trophy standings

	Pos	Manufacturer	Points
	1	(United Kingdom) Jaguar	123
	2	(Germany) Porsche	95
1	3	(Japan) Nissan	88
1	4	(Netherlands) Stellantis	71
	5	(China) ERT	2

- Notes: Only the top five positions are included for all three sets of standings.

== Notes ==
Previous race: 2024 Diriyah ePrix	FIA Formula E World Championship; 2023–24 season	Next race: 2024 Tokyo ePrix
Previous race: 2023 São Paulo ePrix	São Paulo ePrix	Next race: 2024 São Paulo ePrix (December)
