= 2024 São Paulo ePrix (December) =

Race 1 of 16 of the 2024–25 Formula E season
Next race →
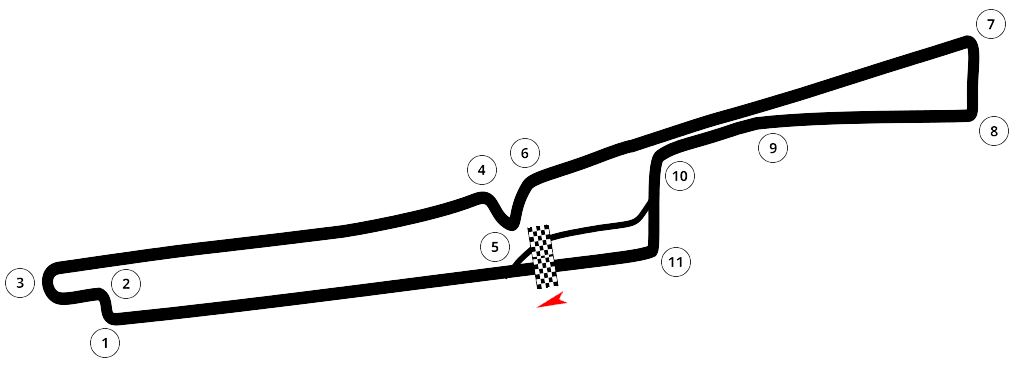

Race details
- Date: 7 December 2024
- Official name: 2024 São Paulo ePrix
- Location: São Paulo Street Circuit, São Paulo, Brazil
- Course: Street Circuit
- Course length: 2.933 km (1.822 mi)
- Distance: 35 (Note: 31 planned laps and 4 extra laps) laps, 102.655 km (63.787 mi)
- Scheduled distance: 31 laps, 90.923 km (56.497 mi)

Pole position
Driver	(Germany) Pascal Wehrlein	Porsche
- Time: 1:09.851

Fastest lap
Driver	(Germany) David Beckmann; António Félix da Costa (Note: The point for fastest lap was awarded to da Costa, as Beckmann did not finish in the top 10.)	Kiro Race Co-Porsche
- Time: 1:12.219

Podium
First	(New Zealand) Mitch Evans	Jaguar
Second	(Portugal) António Félix da Costa	Porsche
Third	(United Kingdom) Taylor Barnard	McLaren-Nissan

The 2024 São Paulo ePrix was the first round of the 2024–25 Formula E World Championship, held on 7 December 2024. It was the third edition of the São Paulo ePrix. The race was held on the São Paulo Street Circuit, around the Anhembi Sambadrome.

The ePrix was won by Mitch Evans for Jaguar, who started from the back of the grid. António Félix da Costa finished second while Taylor Barnard from McLaren completed the podium as he set a record for the youngest podium finisher in Formula E.

== Background ==
The race was the first ePrix run of the Gen3 Evo race cars.

== Classification ==
(All times in BRT)

=== Qualification ===
Qualification took place at 09:40 on 7 December.

Group draw
Group A	(Germany) BEC	(United Kingdom) BIR	(Brazil) DIG	(Portugal) DAC	(Switzerland) BUE	(Netherlands) DEV	(United Kingdom) ROW	(France) JEV	(United Kingdom) DEN	(New Zealand) CAS	(United Kingdom) HUG
Group B	(Germany) WEH	(Belgium) VAN	(Netherlands) FRI	(United Kingdom) BAR	(Germany) GUE	(New Zealand) EVA	(France) NAT	(Barbados) MAL	(United Kingdom) TIC	(Switzerland) MOR	(Switzerland) MUL

==== Qualifying duels ====
Quarter-finals
A2	(Portugal) António Félix da Costa
A3	(United Kingdom) Oliver Rowland
A1	(United Kingdom) Jake Dennis
A4	(France) Jean-Éric Vergne
B2	(Switzerland) Edoardo Mortara
B3	(Germany) Maximilian Günther
B1	(Germany) Pascal Wehrlein
B4	(France) Norman Nato

Semi-finals
(United Kingdom) Oliver Rowland
(United Kingdom) Jake Dennis
(Germany) Maximilian Günther
(Germany) Pascal Wehrlein

Final
(United Kingdom) Oliver Rowland
(Germany) Pascal Wehrlein

==== Overall classification ====
Pos.	No.	Driver	Team	A	B	QF	SF	F	Grid
1	1	(Germany) Pascal Wehrlein	Porsche	—N/a	1:11.717	1:09.992	1:09.859	1:09.851	1
2	23	(United Kingdom) Oliver Rowland	Nissan	1:11.899	—N/a	1:10.047	1:09.905	1:09.950	2
3	27	(United Kingdom) Jake Dennis	Andretti-Porsche	1:11.732	—N/a	1:09.957	1:09.906	—N/a	3
4	7	(Germany) Maximilian Günther	DS Penske	—N/a	1:11.953	1:10.140	1:10.351	—N/a	4
5	13	(Portugal) António Félix da Costa	Porsche	1:11.891	—N/a	1:10.107	—N/a	—N/a	5
6	17	(France) Norman Nato	Nissan	—N/a	1:11.972	1:10.114	—N/a	—N/a	6
7	48	(Switzerland) Edoardo Mortara	Mahindra	—N/a	1:11.933	1:10.461	—N/a	—N/a	7
8	25	(France) Jean-Éric Vergne	DS Penske	1:11.952	—N/a	1:10.486	—N/a	—N/a	8
9	2	(Belgium) Stoffel Vandoorne	Maserati	—N/a	1:12.046	—N/a	—N/a	—N/a	9
10	37	(New Zealand) Nick Cassidy	Jaguar	1:12.055	—N/a	—N/a	—N/a	—N/a	10
11	33	(United Kingdom) Dan Ticktum	Cupra Kiro-Porsche	—N/a	1:12.047	—N/a	—N/a	—N/a	11
12	16	(Switzerland) Sébastien Buemi	Envision-Jaguar	1:12.068	—N/a	—N/a	—N/a	—N/a	12
13	4	(Netherlands) Robin Frijns	Envision-Jaguar	—N/a	1:12.161	—N/a	—N/a	—N/a	13
14	11	(Brazil) Lucas Di Grassi	Lola Yamaha ABT	1:12.100	—N/a	—N/a	—N/a	—N/a	14
15	51	(Switzerland) Nico Müller	Andretti-Porsche	—N/a	1:12.176	—N/a	—N/a	—N/a	15
16	8	(United Kingdom) Sam Bird	McLaren-Nissan	1:12.113	—N/a	—N/a	—N/a	—N/a	16
17	5	(United Kingdom) Taylor Barnard	McLaren-Nissan	—N/a	1:12.423	—N/a	—N/a	—N/a	17
18	55	(United Kingdom) Jake Hughes	Maserati	1:12.154	—N/a	—N/a	—N/a	—N/a	18
19	22	(Barbados) Zane Maloney	Lola Yamaha ABT	—N/a	1:12.550	—N/a	—N/a	—N/a	19
20	3	(Germany) David Beckmann	Cupra Kiro-Porsche	1:12.310	—N/a	—N/a	—N/a	—N/a	20
21	21	(Netherlands) Nyck de Vries	Mahindra	1:12.317	—N/a	—N/a	—N/a	—N/a	21
22	9	(New Zealand) Mitch Evans	Jaguar	—N/a	No time (Note: Evans was not able to set a time due to problems with his brake system, however he was allowed to start from the back of the grid.)	—N/a	—N/a	—N/a	22

=== Race ===
The race started at 14:05 on 7 December.

Pos.	No.	Driver	Team	Laps	Time/Retired	Grid	Points
1	9	(New Zealand) Mitch Evans	Jaguar	35	1:45:14.758	22	25
2	13	(Portugal) António Félix da Costa	Porsche	35	+0.384	5	18+1^{2}
3	5	(United Kingdom) Taylor Barnard	McLaren-Nissan	35	+0.844	17	15
4	8	(United Kingdom) Sam Bird	McLaren-Nissan	35	+1.158	16	12
5	48	(Switzerland) Edoardo Mortara	Mahindra	35	+1.800	7	10
6	21	(Netherlands) Nyck de Vries	Mahindra	35	+2.640	21	8
7	16	(Switzerland) Sébastien Buemi	Envision-Jaguar	35	+2.997	12	6
8	33	(United Kingdom) Dan Ticktum	Cupra Kiro-Porsche	35	+3.683	11	4
9	25	(France) Jean-Éric Vergne	DS Penske	35	+4.216	8	2
10	2	(Belgium) Stoffel Vandoorne	Maserati	35	+4.779	9	1
11	7	(Germany) Maximilian Günther	DS Penske	35	+5.093	4	
12	22	(Barbados) Zane Maloney	Lola Yamaha ABT	35	+6.212	19	
13	17	(France) Norman Nato	Nissan	35	+7.174	6	
14	23	(United Kingdom) Oliver Rowland	Nissan	35	+11.385	2	
DNF	37	(New Zealand) Nick Cassidy	Jaguar	34	Energy issue	10	
DNF	1	(Germany) Pascal Wehrlein	Porsche	29	Collision	1	3^{1}
NC	3	(Germany) David Beckmann	Cupra Kiro-Porsche	29	+6 laps	20	
DNF	27	(United Kingdom) Jake Dennis	Andretti-Porsche	19	Brake failure	3	
DNF	11	(Brazil) Lucas Di Grassi	Lola Yamaha ABT	5	Collision damage	14	
DNF	55	(United Kingdom) Jake Hughes	Maserati	1	Collision	18	
DNF	51	(Switzerland) Nico Müller	Andretti-Porsche	1	Collision	15	
DNS	4	(Netherlands) Robin Frijns	Envision-Jaguar	0	Brake issue	13	

Notes:

- ^1 – Pole position.
- ^2 – Fastest lap.

=== Standings after the race ===
Drivers' Championship standings

Pos	Driver	Points
1	(New Zealand) Mitch Evans	25
2	(Portugal) António Félix da Costa	19
3	(United Kingdom) Taylor Barnard	15
4	(United Kingdom) Sam Bird	12
5	(Switzerland) Edoardo Mortara	10

Teams' Championship standings

Pos	Team	Points
1	(United Kingdom) McLaren	27
2	(United Kingdom) Jaguar	25
3	(Germany) Porsche	22
4	(India) Mahindra	18
5	(United Kingdom) Envision	6

Manufacturers' Championship standings

Pos	Manufacturer	Points
1	(United Kingdom) Jaguar	31
2	(Japan) Nissan	27
3	(Germany) Porsche	22
4	(India) Mahindra	18
5	(Netherlands) Stellantis	3

- Notes: Only the top five positions are included for all three sets of standings.

== Notes ==
Previous race: 2024 London ePrix	FIA Formula E World Championship; 2024–25 season	Next race: 2025 Mexico City ePrix
Previous race: 2024 São Paulo ePrix (March)	São Paulo ePrix	Next race: 2025 São Paulo ePrix
