= Porsche Formula E Team =

German Formula E team

(Germany) Porsche Formula E Team
- Founded: 2019
- Base: Stuttgart, Germany
- Team principal(s): Florian Modlinger
- Current series: Formula E
- Current drivers: (Germany) Pascal Wehrlein (Switzerland) Nico Müller
- Noted drivers: (Switzerland) Neel Jani (Germany) André Lotterer (Portugal) António Félix da Costa
- Races: 107
- Wins: 17
- Podiums: 40
- Poles: 14
- Points: 1451
- Teams' Championships: Formula E 2024-25
- Drivers' Championships: Formula E Pascal Wehrlein (2023–24, 2025–26)
- First entry: 2019 Ad Diriyah ePrix
- Last entry: 2026 London ePrix
- First win: 2022 Mexico City ePrix
- Last win: 2026 London ePrix (R1)
- Website: racing.porsche.com

The Porsche Formula E Team, formerly known as the TAG Heuer Porsche Formula E Team, is a German motorsport team that competes in Formula E, a championship organised by the Fédération Internationale de l'Automobile (FIA). The team made its debut in the series at the 2019 Ad Diriyah ePrix, which opened the 2019–2020 Formula E season. It achieved its first race victory at the 2022 Mexico City ePrix. Porsche's factory team secured its first Formula E Drivers' Championship at the 2024 London ePrix, with Pascal Wehrlein. The team also won the Teams' Championship and the Manufacturers' Championships in the 2025 season, with both titles being decided at the 2025 London ePrix.

== History ==
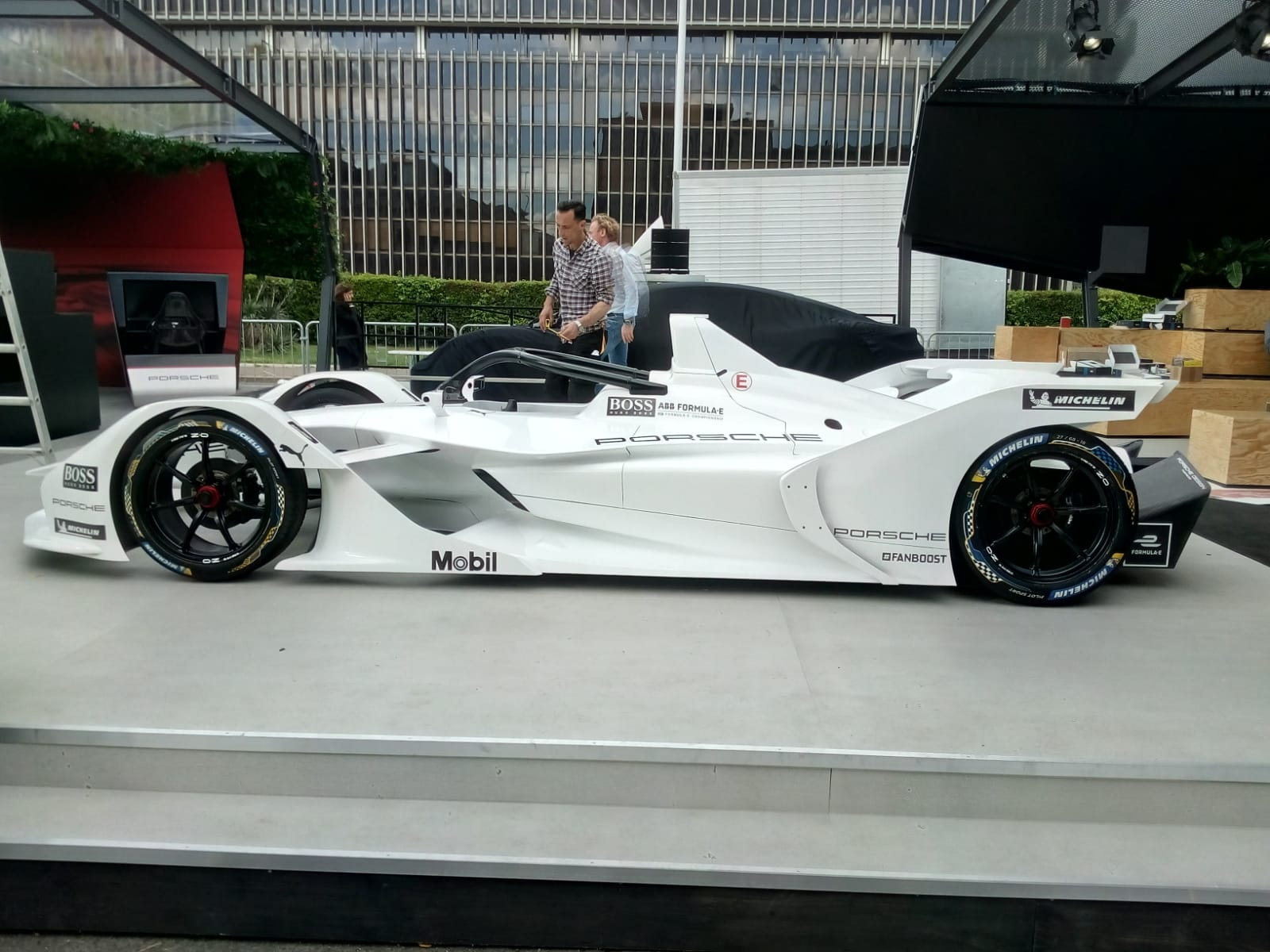
The Spark SRT05e in a Porsche demo livery at the 2019 Rome ePrix.

In July 2017, Porsche confirmed that it would leave the FIA World Endurance Championship at the end of the season in order to focus on their Formula E programme, which was set to begin in the 2019–2020 season. This decision meant that Porsche would enter Formula E concurrently with the Mercedes-Benz EQ Formula E Team, although the latter had already competed in the 2018–19 season via its affiliated team, HWA Racelab.

Entering FE and achieving success in this category are the logical outcomes of our Mission E road car programme. The growing freedom for in-house technology developments makes FE attractive to us. For us, FE is the ultimate competitive environment for driving forward the development of high performance vehicles in areas such as environmental friendliness, efficiency and sustainability.

— Michael Steiner, "Porsche quits WEC LMP1 class for Formula E programme, Autosport.com (28 July 2017)

=== 2019–2020 season ===
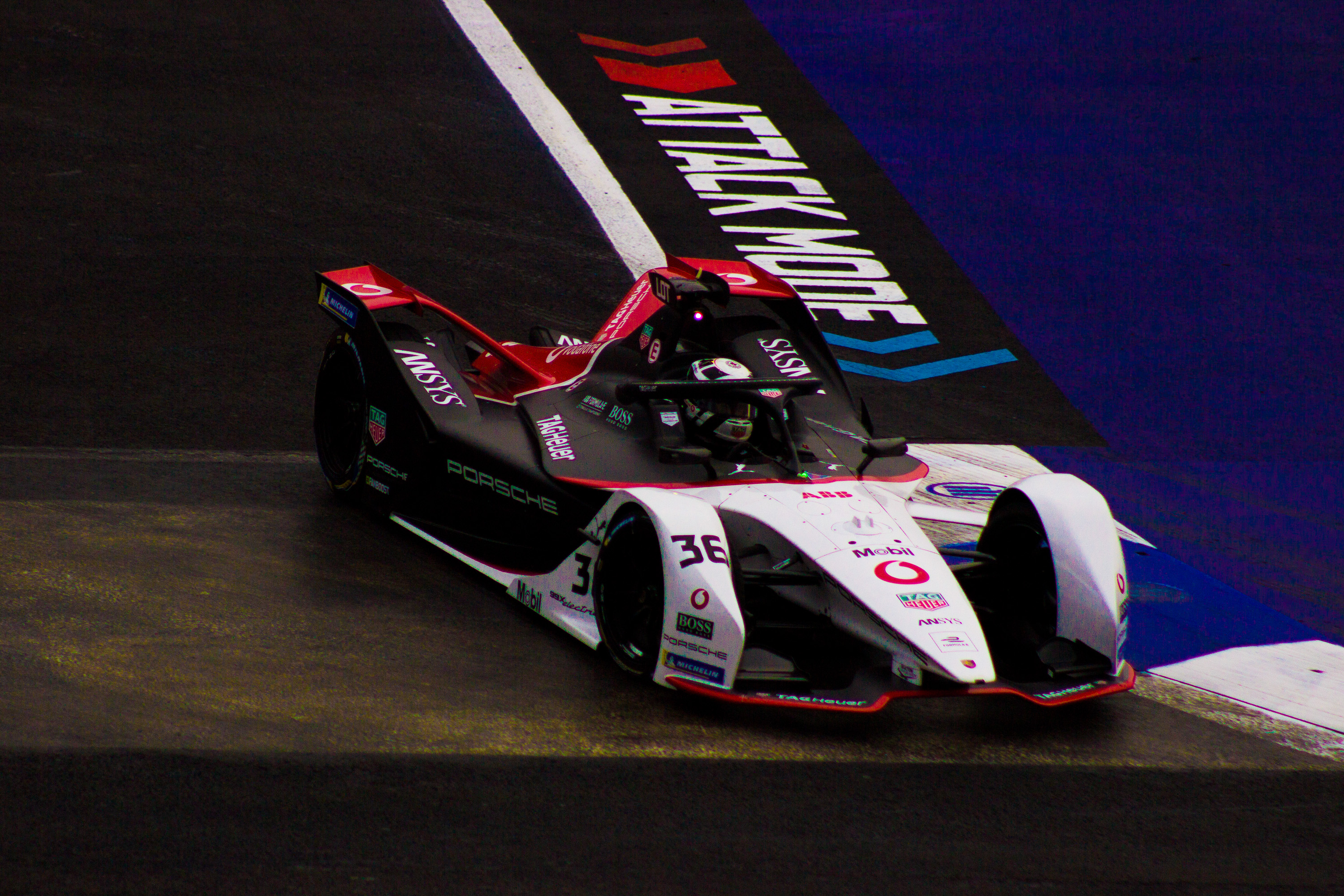
André Lotterer at the 2020 Mexico City ePrix, where he qualified on pole.

In December 2018, Neel Jani was announced as the first driver to compete for the new team. Brendon Hartley was also involved in the development of the new car. Porsche subsequently evaluated whether to sign the inexperienced Hartley on a full-time basis.

In July 2019, Porsche announced former Techeetah driver André Lotterer as its second driver. In September, Porsche confirmed Simona de Silvestro and Thomas Preining as development drivers, following Hartley's signing with GEOX Dragon.

On 1 March 2020, Preining and Frédéric Makowiecki participated in the Marrakesh rookie test, with Preining setting the fifteenth-fastest lap time and Makowiecki finishing last of all drivers who took part in the test.

=== 2020–2021 season ===
In August 2020, Porsche announced that Pascal Wehrlein, who had previously competed for Mahindra Racing, would join the TAG Heuer Porsche Formula E Team for the 2020–21 ABB FIA Formula E World Championship, partnering with André Lotterer. Wehrlein replaced Neel Jani, who stepped away from the Formula E program while remaining involved in Porsche's broader motorsport activities.

=== 2021–2022 season ===
At the Mexico City ePrix, Pascal Wehrlein secured both his and the team's maiden victory after starting from pole position. The team also achieved its first one-two finish, with Lotterer finishing second.

=== 2022–2023 season ===
António Félix da Costa was signed to replace Lotterer, and partner Wehrlein. Alongside the sister team Andretti Formula E, Porsche's powertrain proved dominant in the early part of the season, with Wehrlein winning both Diriyah rounds and leading the Drivers' and Constructors' Championships.

The team secured two further victories, with Félix da Costa winning the Cape Town ePrix and Wehrlein claiming victory in Jakarta. However, inconsistent results and limited qualifying pace ultimately cost the team the championship lead.

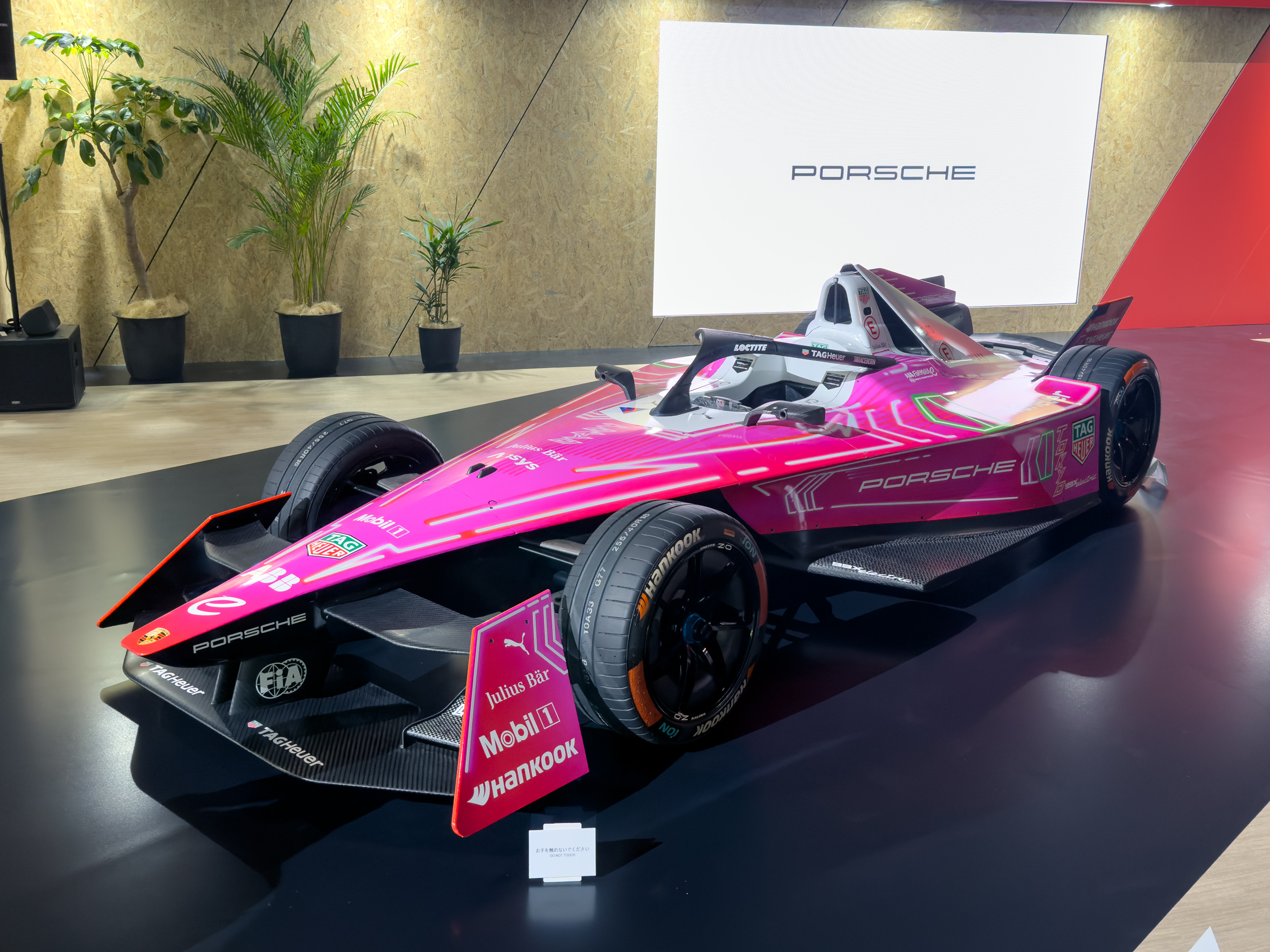
Porsche 99X Electric show car at the 2024 Tokyo ePrix

=== 2023–2024 season ===
Porsche retained their driver lineup of Pascal Wehrlein and António Félix da Costa. The team performed strongly throughout the season, with seven victories shared between the two drivers. Their primary title rivals were Jaguar Racing, represented by Mitch Evans and Nick Cassidy. Although Wehrlein clinched the Drivers' Championship, Porsche finished behind Jaguar in both the Teams' Championship and Manufacturers' Trophy.

=== 2024–2025 season ===
Both Félix da Costa and Wehrlein were retained for Season 11, with Wehrlein entering the season as the defending Drivers' Champion. Despite recording only one race victory, at the 2025 Miami ePrix by Wehrlein, Porsche clinched both Teams' and Manufacturers' Championships.

=== 2025–2026 season ===
Nico Müller joined the team for Season 12, replacing Félix da Costa, who left the team to join Jaguar Racing.

=== Sponsors ===
Sponsor (Note: This list only includes companies whose logos have appeared on the team's cars. Mandatory logos of series' partners are also excluded from the list.)	2019–20	2020–21	2021–22	2022-23	2023-24	2024-25	2025-26
TAG Heuer	Yes T	Yes T	Yes T	Yes T	Yes T	Yes T	Yes
Puma	Yes	Yes	Yes	Yes	Yes	Yes	Yes
Hugo Boss	Yes	Yes	Yes	Yes	No	No	No
Vodafone	Yes	Yes	Yes	No	No	No	No
Mobil	Yes	Yes	Yes	Yes	Yes	Yes	Yes
Ansys/Synopsys	Yes	Yes	Yes	Yes	Yes	Yes	Yes
Cato Networks	No	No	No	Yes	Yes	Yes	Yes
Loctite	No	No	No	Yes	Yes	Yes	Yes
NetApp	No	No	No	No	No	No	Yes
TDK	No	No	No	No	No	No	Yes
Aveva	No	No	No	No	No	No	Yes
DP World	No	No	No	No	No	No	Yes

Past logos
2019–2025

== Results ==
(key) (results in bold indicate pole position; results in italics indicate fastest lap)

Year	Chassis	Powertrain	Tyres	No.	Drivers	1	2	3	4	5	6	7	8	9	10	11	12	13	14	15	16	17	Points	T.C.
TAG Heuer Porsche Formula E Team
2019–20	Spark SRT05e	Porsche 99X Electric (Note: The 99X Electric branding has been used for every Formula E powertrain developed by Porsche ever since their debut season. This is the first powertrain.)	M			DIR		SCL	MEX	MRK	BER		BER		BER								79	8th
2019–20	Spark SRT05e	Porsche 99X Electric	M	18	(Switzerland) Neel Jani	17	13	Ret	14	18	11	15	Ret	19	6	15							79	8th
2019–20	Spark SRT05e	Porsche 99X Electric	M	36	(Germany) André Lotterer	2	14	DSQ	**Ret**	8	2	9	5	8	4	14							79	8th
2020–21	Spark SRT05e	Porsche 99X Electric (Note: The 99X Electric branding has been used for every Formula E powertrain developed by Porsche ever since their debut season. This is the second powertrain.)	M			DIR		RME		VLC		MCO	PUE		NYC		LDN		BER	BER			137	8th
2020–21	Spark SRT05e	Porsche 99X Electric	M	36	(Germany) André Lotterer	16	11	14	15	Ret	2	17	DSQ	17	8	5	4^{G}	17	10	4			137	8th
2020–21	Spark SRT05e	Porsche 99X Electric	M	99	(Germany) Pascal Wehrlein	5	10	7	3	Ret	18	Ret	**DSQ**^{G}	4	Ret	4	10	5	21	6			137	8th
2021–22	Spark SRT05e	Porsche 99X Electric	M			DRH		MEX	RME		MCO	BER		JAK	MRK	NYC		LDN		SEO			134	7th
2021–22	Spark SRT05e	Porsche 99X Electric	M	36	(Germany) André Lotterer	13	4	2	10	4	Ret	4	8	9	15	16	9	12	12	Ret	Ret		134	7th
2021–22	Spark SRT05e	Porsche 99X Electric	M	94	(Germany) Pascal Wehrlein	11	9	**1**	8	6	Ret	6	12	8	12	6	11	10	10	7	Ret		134	7th
2022–23	Formula E Gen3	Porsche 99X Electric (Note: The 99X Electric branding has been used for every Formula E powertrain developed by Porsche ever since their debut season. This is the third powertrain.)	H			MEX	DIR		HYD	CPT	SPL	BER		MCO	JAK		PRT	RME		LDN			242	4th
2022–23	Formula E Gen3	Porsche 99X Electric	H	13	(Portugal) António Félix da Costa	7	18	11	3	1	4	Ret	5	15	8	7	3	Ret	12	16	16		242	4th
2022–23	Formula E Gen3	Porsche 99X Electric	H	94	(Germany) Pascal Wehrlein	2	1	1	4	Ret	7	6	7	10	1	6	8	9	7	9	10		242	4th
2023–24	Formula E Gen3	Porsche 99X Electric	H			MEX	DIR		SAP	TOK	MIS		MCO	BER		SHA		POR		LDN			332	2nd
2023–24	Formula E Gen3	Porsche 99X Electric	H	13	(Portugal) António Félix da Costa	Ret	16	14	6	4	DSQ	17	7	6	1	18	1	1	1	Ret	13		332	2nd
2023–24	Formula E Gen3	Porsche 99X Electric	H	94	(Germany) Pascal Wehrlein	**1**	8	7	**4**	5	16	1	**5**	5	4	2	20	10	4	1	2		332	2nd
2024–25	Formula E Gen3 Evo	Porsche 99X Electric (Note: The 99X Electric branding has been used for every Formula E powertrain developed by Porsche ever since their debut season. This is the fourth powertrain.)	H			SAP	MEX	JED		MIA	MCO		TOK		SHA		JAK	BER		LDN			256	1st
2024–25	Formula E Gen3 Evo	Porsche 99X Electric	H	1	(Germany) Pascal Wehrlein	**Ret**	**3**	15	8	1	6	7	13	2	12	2	12	2	**15**	3	8		256	1st
2024–25	Formula E Gen3 Evo	Porsche 99X Electric	H	13	(Portugal) António Félix da Costa	2	2	9	Ret	3	Ret	4	7	Ret	13	3	5	10	8	14	6		256	1st
Porsche Formula E Team
2025–26	Formula E Gen3 Evo	Porsche 99X Electric	H			SAP	MEX	MIA	YED		MAD	BER		MON		SNY	SHA		TOK		LDN		271	2nd
2025–26	Formula E Gen3 Evo	Porsche 99X Electric	H	51	(Switzerland) Nico Müller	5	9	**2**	4	16	8	1	13	11	6	7	10	7	18	7	11	12	271	2nd
2025–26	Formula E Gen3 Evo	Porsche 99X Electric	H	94	(Germany) Pascal Wehrlein	**4**	6	3	1	8	3	19	**3**	18	11	14	**1**	4	Ret	13	**1**	14	271	2nd

Notes

- ^{G} – Driver was fastest in group qualifying stage and was given one championship point.
- † – Driver did not finish the race, but was classified as he completed over 90% of the race distance.
- * – Season still in progress.

=== Other teams supplied by Porsche ===
Year	Team	Chassis	Powertrain	Tyres	No.	Drivers	Points	T.C.
2022–23	(United States) Avalanche Andretti Formula E	Spark Gen3	Porsche 99X Electric (Note: The 99X Electric branding has been used for every Formula E powertrain developed by Porsche ever since their debut season. This is the third powertrain.)	H	No.	Drivers	252	3rd
2022–23	(United States) Avalanche Andretti Formula E	Spark Gen3	Porsche 99X Electric	H	27	(United Kingdom) Jake Dennis	252	3rd
2022–23	(United States) Avalanche Andretti Formula E	Spark Gen3	Porsche 99X Electric	H	36	(Germany) André Lotterer	252	3rd
2022–23	(United States) Avalanche Andretti Formula E	Spark Gen3	Porsche 99X Electric	H	36	(Germany) David Beckmann	252	3rd
2023–24	(United States) Andretti Formula E	Spark Gen3	Porsche 99X Electric	H				
2023–24	(United States) Andretti Formula E	Spark Gen3	Porsche 99X Electric	H	1	(United Kingdom) Jake Dennis	169	5th
2023–24	(United States) Andretti Formula E	Spark Gen3	Porsche 99X Electric	H	17	(France) Norman Nato	169	5th
2024–25	(United States) Andretti Formula E	Spark Gen3 Evo	Porsche 99X Electric (Note: The 99X Electric branding has been used for every Formula E powertrain developed by Porsche ever since their debut season. This is the fourth powertrain.)	H			169	5th
2024–25	(United States) Andretti Formula E	Spark Gen3 Evo	Porsche 99X Electric	H	27	(United Kingdom) Jake Dennis	141	7th
2024–25	(United States) Andretti Formula E	Spark Gen3 Evo	Porsche 99X Electric	H	51	(Switzerland) Nico Müller	141	7th
2024–25	(United States) Cupra Kiro	Spark Gen3 Evo	Porsche 99X Electric WCG3 (Note: Kiro are using the previous (third) generation of the Porsche 99X Electric powertrain, updated to meet Gen3 Evo regulations.)	H			141	7th
2024–25	(United States) Cupra Kiro	Spark Gen3 Evo	Porsche 99X Electric WCG3	H	3	(Germany) David Beckmann	86	10th
2024–25	(United States) Cupra Kiro	Spark Gen3 Evo	Porsche 99X Electric WCG3	H	33	(United Kingdom) Dan Ticktum	86	10th
