= 2023 Berlin ePrix =

Race 7 of 16 of the 2022–23 Formula E season
← Previous race	Next race →

Race details
- Date: 22 April 2023
- Official name: 2023 SABIC Berlin E-Prix
- Location: Tempelhof Airport Street Circuit, Berlin
- Course: Street circuit
- Course length: 2.355 km (1.463 mi)
- Distance: 43 (Note: 40 planned laps and 3 extra laps) laps, 101.265 km (62.923 mi)
- Scheduled distance: 40 laps, 94.200 km (58.533 mi)

Pole position
Driver	(Switzerland) Sébastien Buemi	Envision-Jaguar
- Time: 1:05.605

Fastest lap
Driver	(Germany) André Lotterer	Andretti-Porsche
- Time: 1:07.269

Podium
First	(New Zealand) Mitch Evans	Jaguar
Second	(United Kingdom) Sam Bird	Jaguar
Third	(Germany) Maximilian Günther	Maserati

2023 Berlin ePrix
Race 8 of 16 of the 2022–23 Formula E season
← Previous race	Next race →

Race details
- Date: 23 April 2022
- Official name: 2023 SABIC Berlin E-Prix
- Location: Tempelhof Airport Street Circuit, Berlin
- Course: Street circuit
- Course length: 2.355 km (1.463 mi)
- Distance: 40 laps, 94.200 km (58.533 mi)

Pole position
Driver	(Netherlands) Robin Frijns	ABT-Mahindra
- Time: 1:18.748

Fastest lap
Driver	(Germany) Maximilian Günther	Maserati
- Time: 1:06.911

Podium
First	(New Zealand) Nick Cassidy	Envision-Jaguar
Second	(United Kingdom) Jake Dennis	Andretti-Porsche
Third	(France) Jean-Éric Vergne	DS

The 2023 Berlin ePrix, known for sponsorship reasons as the 2023 SABIC Berlin E-Prix, was a pair of Formula E electric car races held at the Tempelhof Airport Street Circuit at Tempelhof Airport in the outskirts of Berlin, Germany on 22 and 23 April 2023. It served as the seventh and eighth rounds of the 2022–23 Formula E season, and marked the ninth edition of the Berlin ePrix, the only event to have featured in every season of the Formula E championship. The first race was won by Mitch Evans for Jaguar TCS Racing, with Sam Bird and Maximilian Günther in second and third place respectively. The second race was won by Nick Cassidy for the Envision Racing team, with Jake Dennis and Jean-Éric Vergne completing the podium.

== Classification ==
=== Race one ===
==== Qualification ====
Qualification took place at 10:40 AM on 22 April.

Group draw
Group A	(Germany) WEH	(New Zealand) CAS	(Portugal) DAC	(Switzerland) BUE	(New Zealand) EVA	(Belgium) VAN	(Germany) LOT	(Brazil) SET	(United Kingdom) ROW	(Switzerland) MOR	(Switzerland) MUE
Group B	(United Kingdom) DEN	(France) JEV	(United Kingdom) BIR	(Germany) RAS	(United Kingdom) HUG	(Brazil) DIG	(France) NAT	(United Kingdom) TIC	(France) FEN	(Germany) GUN	(Netherlands) FRI

===== Qualifying duels =====
Quarter-finals
A2	(Switzerland) Sébastien Buemi
A3	(New Zealand) Nick Cassidy
A1	(Belgium) Stoffel Vandoorne
A4	(Brazil) Sérgio Sette Câmara
B3	(United Kingdom) Dan Ticktum
B2	(Germany) Maximilian Günther
B1	(United Kingdom) Sam Bird
B4	(United Kingdom) Jake Dennis

Semi-finals
(Switzerland) Sébastien Buemi
(Belgium) Stoffel Vandoorne
(United Kingdom) Dan Ticktum
(United Kingdom) Sam Bird

Final
(Switzerland) Sébastien Buemi
(United Kingdom) Sam Bird

===== Overall classification =====
Pos.	No.	Driver	Team	A	B	QF	SF	F	Grid
1	16	(Switzerland) Sébastien Buemi	Envision-Jaguar	1:06.086	—N/a	1:05.601	1:05.414	1:05.605	1
2	10	(United Kingdom) Sam Bird	Jaguar	—N/a	1:05.975	1:05.595	1:05.535	1:05.742	2
3	1	(Belgium) Stoffel Vandoorne	DS	1:05.978	—N/a	1:05.393	1:05.524	—N/a	3
4	33	(United Kingdom) Dan Ticktum	NIO	—N/a	1:06.145	1:05.592	1:05.670	—N/a	4
5	27	(United Kingdom) Jake Dennis	Andretti-Porsche	—N/a	1:06.171	1:05.656	—N/a	—N/a	5
6	37	(New Zealand) Nick Cassidy	Envision-Jaguar	1:06.156	—N/a	1:05.679	—N/a	—N/a	6
7	7	(Brazil) Sérgio Sette Câmara	NIO	1:06.204	—N/a	1:05.761	—N/a	—N/a	7
8	22	(Germany) Maximilian Günther	Maserati	—N/a	1:06.055	1:05.878	—N/a	—N/a	8
9	9	(New Zealand) Mitch Evans	Jaguar	1:06.265	—N/a	—N/a	—N/a	—N/a	9
10	25	(France) Jean-Éric Vergne	DS	—N/a	1:06.193	—N/a	—N/a	—N/a	10
11	48	(Switzerland) Edoardo Mortara	Maserati	1:06.354	—N/a	—N/a	—N/a	—N/a	11
12	5	(United Kingdom) Jake Hughes	McLaren-Nissan	—N/a	1:06.309	—N/a	—N/a	—N/a	12
13	36	(Germany) André Lotterer	Andretti-Porsche	1:06.415	—N/a	—N/a	—N/a	—N/a	13
14	58	(Germany) René Rast	McLaren-Nissan	—N/a	1:06.418	—N/a	—N/a	—N/a	14
15	94	(Germany) Pascal Wehrlein	Porsche	1:06.493	—N/a	—N/a	—N/a	—N/a	15
16	17	(France) Norman Nato	Nissan	—N/a	1:06.518	—N/a	—N/a	—N/a	16
17	51	(Switzerland) Nico Müller	ABT-Mahindra	1:06.496	—N/a	—N/a	—N/a	—N/a	17
18	23	(France) Sacha Fenestraz	Nissan	—N/a	1:06.571	—N/a	—N/a	—N/a	18
19	13	(Portugal) António Félix da Costa	Porsche	1:06.498	—N/a	—N/a	—N/a	—N/a	19
20	11	(Brazil) Lucas di Grassi	Mahindra	—N/a	1:06.574	—N/a	—N/a	—N/a	20
21	30	(United Kingdom) Oliver Rowland	Mahindra	1:07.104	—N/a	—N/a	—N/a	—N/a	21
22	4	(Netherlands) Robin Frijns	ABT-Mahindra	—N/a	1:06.775	—N/a	—N/a	—N/a	22

==== Race ====
The race took place on April 22 at 3:03 PM.

Pos.	No.	Driver	Team	Laps	Time/Retired	Grid	Points
1	9	(New Zealand) Mitch Evans	Jaguar	43	55:10.391	9	25
2	10	(United Kingdom) Sam Bird	Jaguar	43	+1.850	2	18
3	7	(Germany) Maximilian Günther	Maserati	43	+2.738	8	15
4	16	(Switzerland) Sébastien Buemi	Envision-Jaguar	43	+2.849	1	12+3^{1}
5	37	(New Zealand) Nick Cassidy	Envision-Jaguar	43	+4.787	6	10
6	94	(Germany) Pascal Wehrlein	Porsche	43	+9.111	15	8
7	25	(France) Jean-Éric Vergne	DS	43	+9.191	10	6
8	36	(Germany) André Lotterer	Andretti-Porsche	43	+9.504 (Note: Lotterer received a 5-second penalty for causing a collision with Vergne.)	13	4+1^{2}
9	48	(Switzerland) Edoardo Mortara	Maserati	43	+10.159	11	2
10	8	(United Kingdom) Oliver Rowland	Mahindra	43	+10.308	21	1
11	11	(Brazil) Lucas di Grassi	Mahindra	43	+19.449	20	
12	23	(France) Sacha Fenestraz	Nissan	43	+21.549	18	
13	17	(France) Norman Nato	Nissan	43	+24.561	16	
14	4	(Netherlands) Robin Frijns	ABT-Mahindra	43	+25.627	22	
15	51	(Switzerland) Nico Müller	ABT-Mahindra	43	+27.580	17	
16	3	(Brazil) Sérgio Sette Câmara	NIO	43	+38.847	7	
17	58	(Germany) René Rast	McLaren-Nissan	42	+1 Lap (Note: Rast received a 5-second penalty for causing a collision with Sette Câmara.)	14	
18	27	(United Kingdom) Jake Dennis	Andretti-Porsche	38	+5 Laps (Note: Dennis received a penalty for causing a collision with da Costa.)	5	
Ret	13	(Portugal) António Félix da Costa	Porsche	30	Collision	19	
Ret	33	(United Kingdom) Dan Ticktum	NIO	19	Collision	4	
Ret	1	(Belgium) Stoffel Vandoorne	DS	19	Collision	3	
Ret	5	(United Kingdom) Jake Hughes	McLaren-Nissan	19	Collision damage	12	

Notes:

- ^1 – Pole position.
- ^2 – Fastest lap.

==== Standings after the race ====
Drivers' Championship standings

	Pos	Driver	Points
	1	(Germany) Pascal Wehrlein	94
1	2	(New Zealand) Nick Cassidy	71
1	3	(France) Jean-Éric Vergne	66
5	4	(New Zealand) Mitch Evans	64
3	5	(United Kingdom) Jake Dennis	62

Teams' Championship standings

Pos	Constructor	Points
1	(Germany) Porsche	152
2	(United Kingdom) Envision-Jaguar	128
3	(United Kingdom) Jaguar	126
4	(France) DS	88
5	(United States) Andretti-Porsche	85

- Notes: Only the top five positions are included for both sets of standings.

=== Race two ===
==== Qualification ====
Qualification took place at 10:40 AM on 23 April.

Group draw
Group A	(Germany) WEH	(France) JEV	(United Kingdom) DEN	(Portugal) DAC	(Germany) RAS	(Germany) LOT	(Brazil) DIG	(France) NAT	(United Kingdom) ROW	(France) FEN	(Switzerland) MUE
Group B	(New Zealand) CAS	(New Zealand) EVA	(United Kingdom) BIR	(Switzerland) BUE	(United Kingdom) HUG	(Belgium) VAN	(Germany) GUN	(Brazil) SET	(United Kingdom) TIC	(Switzerland) MOR	(Netherlands) FRI

===== Qualifying duels =====
Quarter-finals
A3	(Switzerland) Nico Müller
A2	(Germany) Pascal Wehrlein
A1	(France) Jean-Éric Vergne
A4	(United Kingdom) Jake Dennis
B2	(Netherlands) Robin Frijns
B3	(New Zealand) Mitch Evans
B1	(Switzerland) Sébastien Buemi
B4	(New Zealand) Nick Cassidy

Semi-finals
(Switzerland) Nico Müller
(France) Jean-Éric Vergne
(Netherlands) Robin Frijns
(Switzerland) Sébastien Buemi

Final
(Switzerland) Nico Müller
(Netherlands) Robin Frijns

===== Overall classification =====
Pos.	No.	Driver	Team	A	B	QF	SF	F	Grid
1	4	(Netherlands) Robin Frijns	ABT-Mahindra	—N/a	1:18.447	1:18.423	1:18.743	1:18.748	1
2	51	(Switzerland) Nico Müller	ABT-Mahindra	1:19.092	—N/a	1:18.493	1:19.177	1:19.380	2
3	16	(Switzerland) Sébastien Buemi	Envision-Jaguar	—N/a	1:18.282	1:18.813	1:19.071	—N/a	3
4	25	(France) Jean-Éric Vergne	DS	1:19.047	—N/a	1:19.298	1:19.237	—N/a	4
5	9	(New Zealand) Mitch Evans	Jaguar	—N/a	1:18.528	1:18.492	—N/a	—N/a	5
6	94	(Germany) Pascal Wehrlein	Porsche	1:19.073	—N/a	1:18.805	—N/a	—N/a	6
7	27	(United Kingdom) Jake Dennis	Andretti-Porsche	1:19.264	—N/a	1:19.727	—N/a	—N/a	7
8	37	(New Zealand) Nick Cassidy	Envision-Jaguar	—N/a	1:18.650	No time (Note: Cassidy's quarter-final lap time was deleted for not respecting the duels procedure.)	—N/a	—N/a	8
9	1	(Belgium) Stoffel Vandoorne	DS	—N/a	1:18.974	—N/a	—N/a	—N/a	9
10	13	(Portugal) António Félix da Costa	Porsche	1:19.297	—N/a	—N/a	—N/a	—N/a	10
11	10	(United Kingdom) Sam Bird	Jaguar	—N/a	1:19.010	—N/a	—N/a	—N/a	11
12	30	(United Kingdom) Oliver Rowland	Mahindra	1:19.459	—N/a	—N/a	—N/a	—N/a	12
13	33	(United Kingdom) Dan Ticktum	NIO	—N/a	1:19.232	—N/a	—N/a	—N/a	18 (Note: Ticktum received a 5-place grid penalty for causing a collision with Vandoorne in the first Berlin race.)
14	11	(Brazil) Lucas di Grassi	Mahindra	1:19.600	—N/a	—N/a	—N/a	—N/a	13
15	5	(United Kingdom) Jake Hughes	McLaren-Nissan	—N/a	1:19.257	—N/a	—N/a	—N/a	14
16	36	(Germany) André Lotterer	Andretti-Porsche	1:19.741	—N/a	—N/a	—N/a	—N/a	15
17	48	(Switzerland) Edoardo Mortara	Maserati	—N/a	1:19.422	—N/a	—N/a	—N/a	16
18	58	(Germany) René Rast	McLaren-Nissan	1:20.848	—N/a	—N/a	—N/a	—N/a	17
19	3	(Brazil) Sérgio Sette Câmara	NIO	—N/a	1:19.441	—N/a	—N/a	—N/a	19
20	23	(France) Sacha Fenestraz	Nissan	1:21.059	—N/a	—N/a	—N/a	—N/a	20
21	7	(Germany) Maximilian Günther	Maserati	—N/a	1:19.961	—N/a	—N/a	—N/a	21
22	17	(France) Norman Nato	Nissan	1:21.272	—N/a	—N/a	—N/a	—N/a	22

==== Race ====
The race took place on April 23 at 3:03 PM.

Pos.	No.	Driver	Team	Laps	Time/Retired	Grid	Points
1	37	(New Zealand) Nick Cassidy	Envision-Jaguar	40	46:34.509	8	25
2	27	(United Kingdom) Jake Dennis	Andretti-Porsche	40	+0.442	7	18
3	25	(France) Jean-Éric Vergne	DS	40	+1.292	4	15
4	9	(New Zealand) Mitch Evans	Jaguar	40	+1.769	5	12
5	13	(Portugal) António Félix da Costa	Porsche	40	+2.460	10	10
6	7	(Germany) Maximilian Günther	Maserati	40	+2.981	21	8+1
7	94	(Germany) Pascal Wehrlein	Porsche	40	+3.545	6	6
8	1	(Belgium) Stoffel Vandoorne	DS	40	+4.581	9	4
9	51	(Switzerland) Nico Müller	ABT-Mahindra	40	+6.612	2	2
10	33	(United Kingdom) Dan Ticktum	NIO	40	+7.822	18	1
11	23	(France) Sacha Fenestraz	Nissan	40	+9.461	20	
12	11	(Brazil) Lucas di Grassi	Mahindra	40	+9.462	12	
13	58	(Germany) René Rast	McLaren-Nissan	40	+9.678	17	
14	8	(United Kingdom) Oliver Rowland	Mahindra	40	+11.780	13	
15	3	(Brazil) Sérgio Sette Câmara	NIO	40	+13.687	19	
16	17	(France) Norman Nato	Nissan	40	+13.749	22	
17	4	(Netherlands) Robin Frijns	ABT-Mahindra	40	+22.937	1	
18	5	(United Kingdom) Jake Hughes	McLaren-Nissan	40	+29.580	14	
19	10	(United Kingdom) Sam Bird	Jaguar	40	+34.381	11	
20	16	(Switzerland) Sébastien Buemi	Envision-Jaguar	40	+1:03.532	3	
21	36	(Germany) André Lotterer	Andretti-Porsche	40	+1:04.102	15	
Ret	48	(Switzerland) Edoardo Mortara	Maserati	37	Suspension	16	

==== Standings after the race ====
Drivers' Championship standings

	Pos	Driver	Points
	1	(Germany) Pascal Wehrlein	100
	2	(New Zealand) Nick Cassidy	96
	3	(France) Jean-Éric Vergne	81
1	4	(United Kingdom) Jake Dennis	80
1	5	(New Zealand) Mitch Evans	76

Teams' Championship standings

Pos	Constructor	Points
1	(Germany) Porsche	168
2	(United Kingdom) Envision-Jaguar	153
3	(United Kingdom) Jaguar	138
4	(France) DS	107
5	(United States) Andretti-Porsche	103

- Notes: Only the top five positions are included for both sets of standings.

== Notes ==
Previous race: 2023 São Paulo ePrix	FIA Formula E World Championship; 2022–23 season	Next race: 2023 Monaco ePrix
Previous race: 2022 Berlin ePrix	Berlin ePrix	Next race: 2024 Berlin ePrix
