= 2023 Monaco ePrix =

Race 9 of 16 of the 2022–23 Formula E season
← Previous race	Next race →

Race details
- Date: 6 May 2023
- Location: Circuit de Monaco, Monte Carlo, Monaco
- Course: Street Circuit
- Course length: 3.337 km (2.074 mi)
- Distance: 29 laps, 96.773 km (60.132 mi)

Pole position
Driver	(United Kingdom) Jake Hughes	McLaren-Nissan
- Time: N/A

Fastest lap
Driver	(United Kingdom) Jake Dennis	Andretti-Porsche
- Time: 1:31.119 on lap 27

Podium
First	(New Zealand) Nick Cassidy	Envision-Jaguar
Second	(New Zealand) Mitch Evans	Jaguar
Third	(United Kingdom) Jake Dennis	Andretti-Porsche

The 2023 Monaco ePrix was the ninth race of the 2022–23 Formula E World Championship on 6 May 2023. The race was held on the Circuit de Monaco and was won by Nick Cassidy, with Mitch Evans and Jake Dennis completing the podium.

== Background ==
Pascal Wehrlein entered the Monaco ePrix with the lead of the championship with 100 points, 4 ahead of Nick Cassidy following his win at Berlin and 19 points ahead of Jean-Éric Vergne in third. Porsche led the Teams Championship by 15 points to Envision Racing.

== Classification ==
=== Qualification ===
Group draw
Group A	(Germany) WEH	(France) JEV	(New Zealand) EVA	(Belgium) VAN	(United Kingdom) BIR	(Germany) RAS	(Germany) LOT	(France) NAT	(United Kingdom) TIC	(France) FEN	(Netherlands) FRI
Group B	(New Zealand) CAS	(United Kingdom) DEN	(Portugal) DAC	(Switzerland) BUE	(United Kingdom) HUG	(Germany) GUE	(Brazil) DIG	(Brazil) SET	(United Kingdom) ROW	(Switzerland) MOR	(Switzerland) MUE

==== Qualifying duels ====
Quarter-finals
A3	(United Kingdom) Dan Ticktum
A2	(France) Sacha Fenestraz
A1	(France) Norman Nato
A4	(New Zealand) Mitch Evans
B3	(Switzerland) Edoardo Mortara
B2	(United Kingdom) Jake Hughes
B4	(Brazil) Sérgio Sette Câmara
B1	(Germany) Maximilian Günther

Semi-finals
(France) Sacha Fenestraz
(France) Norman Nato
(United Kingdom) Jake Hughes
(Germany) Maximilian Günther

Final
(France) Sacha Fenestraz
(United Kingdom) Jake Hughes

==== Overall classification ====
Pos.	No.	Driver	Team	A	B	QF	SF	F	Grid
1	5	(United Kingdom) Jake Hughes	McLaren-Nissan	—N/a	1:30:179	1:29:082	1:28:942	No time (Note: Hughes' finals time was deleted for exceeding track limits. He still started on pole position.)	1
2	23	(France) Sacha Fenestraz	Nissan	1:30:149	—N/a	1:29:031	1:28:773	No time (Note: Fenestraz's finals time was deleted due to overpower.)	2
3	17	(France) Norman Nato	Nissan	1:30:138	—N/a	1:29:113	1:29:236	—N/a	3
4	7	(Germany) Maximilian Günther	Maserati	—N/a	1:30:175	1:29:636	1:29:450	—N/a	4
5	33	(United Kingdom) Dan Ticktum	NIO	1:30:156	—N/a	1:29:326	—N/a	—N/a	5
6	9	(New Zealand) Mitch Evans	Jaguar	1:30:285	—N/a	1:29:350	—N/a	—N/a	6
7	48	(Switzerland) Edoardo Mortara	Maserati	—N/a	1:30:241	1:29:484	—N/a	—N/a	7
8	3	(Brazil) Sérgio Sette Câmara	NIO	—N/a	1:30:270	No time (Note: Sette Câmara missed his duels slot, being disqualified from the quarter-finals.)	—N/a	—N/a	8
9	37	(New Zealand) Nick Cassidy	Envision-Jaguar	—N/a	1:30:427	—N/a	—N/a	—N/a	9
10	36	(Germany) André Lotterer	Andretti-Porsche	1:30:332	—N/a	—N/a	—N/a	—N/a	10
11	27	(United Kingdom) Jake Dennis	Andretti-Porsche	—N/a	1:30:548	—N/a	—N/a	—N/a	11
12	94	(Germany) Pascal Wehrlein	Porsche	1:30:481	—N/a	—N/a	—N/a	—N/a	12
13	8	(United Kingdom) Oliver Rowland	Mahindra	—N/a	1:30:555	—N/a	—N/a	—N/a	13
14	58	(Germany) René Rast	McLaren-Nissan	1:30:613	—N/a	—N/a	—N/a	—N/a	14
15	16	(Switzerland) Sébastien Buemi	Envision-Jaguar	—N/a	1:30:570	—N/a	—N/a	—N/a	15
16	10	(United Kingdom) Sam Bird	Jaguar	1:30:645	—N/a	—N/a	—N/a	—N/a	16
17	51	(Switzerland) Nico Müller	ABT-Mahindra	—N/a	1:30:610	—N/a	—N/a	—N/a	17
18	4	(Netherlands) Robin Frijns	ABT-Mahindra	1:30:937	—N/a	—N/a	—N/a	—N/a	18
19	13	(Portugal) António Félix da Costa	Porsche	—N/a	1:30:675	—N/a	—N/a	—N/a	19
20	11	(Brazil) Lucas di Grassi	Mahindra	—N/a	1:30:821	—N/a	—N/a	—N/a	20
21	1	(Belgium) Stoffel Vandoorne	DS	No time (Note: Vandoorne's qualifying laps were deleted due to low tyre pressure. He was still permitted to race at the stewards' discretion)	—N/a	—N/a	—N/a	—N/a	21
22	25	(France) Jean-Éric Vergne	DS	No time (Note: Vergne's qualifying laps were deleted due to low tyre pressure. He was still permitted to race at the stewards' discretion)	—N/a	—N/a	—N/a	—N/a	22

=== Race ===
Pos.	No.	Driver	Team	Laps	Time/Retired	Grid	Points
1	37	(New Zealand) Nick Cassidy	Envision-Jaguar	29	50:23:842	9	25
2	9	(New Zealand) Mitch Evans	Jaguar	29	+0.390	6	18
3	27	(United Kingdom) Jake Dennis	Andretti-Porsche	29	+1.017	11	15+1^{2}
4	23	(France) Sacha Fenestraz	Nissan	29	+2.148	2	12
5	5	(United Kingdom) Jake Hughes	McLaren-Nissan	29	+2.788	1	10+3^{1}
6	33	(United Kingdom) Dan Ticktum	NIO	29	+3.368	5	8
7	25	(France) Jean-Éric Vergne	DS	29	+4.374	22	6
8	16	(Switzerland) Sébastien Buemi	Envision-Jaguar	29	+4.783	15	4
9	1	(Belgium) Stoffel Vandoorne	DS	29	+5.394	21	2
10	94	(Germany) Pascal Wehrlein	Porsche	29	+6.705	12	1
11	48	(Switzerland) Edoardo Mortara	Maserati	29	+7.624	7	
12	11	(Brazil) Lucas di Grassi	Mahindra	29	+8.576	20	
13	4	(Netherlands) Robin Frijns	ABT-Mahindra	29	+9.620	18	
14	3	(Brazil) Sérgio Sette Câmara	NIO	29	+10.684	8	
15	13	(Portugal) António Félix da Costa	Porsche	29	+11.141	19	
16	10	(United Kingdom) Sam Bird	Jaguar	29	+11.469 (Note: Bird received a 5-second time penalty for causing a collision with Müller.)	16	
17	58	(Germany) René Rast	McLaren-Nissan	29	+12.295	14	
18	17	(France) Norman Nato	Nissan	29	+13.423	3	
Ret	51	(Switzerland) Nico Müller	ABT-Mahindra	27	Collision	17	
Ret	7	(Germany) Maximilian Günther	Maserati	21	Collision	4	
Ret	8	(United Kingdom) Oliver Rowland	Mahindra	18	Collision	13	
Ret	36	(Germany) André Lotterer	Andretti-Porsche	1	Collision	10	

Notes:

- ^1 – Pole position.
- ^2 – Fastest lap.

=== Standings after the race ===
Drivers' Championship standings

	Pos	Driver	Points
1	1	(New Zealand) Nick Cassidy	121
1	2	(Germany) Pascal Wehrlein	101
1	3	(United Kingdom) Jake Dennis	96
1	4	(New Zealand) Mitch Evans	94
2	5	(France) Jean-Éric Vergne	87

Teams' Championship standings

	Pos	Constructor	Points
1	1	(United Kingdom) Envision-Jaguar	182
1	2	(Germany) Porsche	169
	3	(United Kingdom) Jaguar	156
1	4	(United States) Andretti-Porsche	119
1	5	(France) DS	115

- Notes: Only the top five positions are included for both sets of standings.

== Notes ==
Previous race: 2023 Berlin ePrix	FIA Formula E World Championship; 2022–23 season	Next race: 2023 Jakarta ePrix
Previous race: 2022 Monaco ePrix	Monaco ePrix	Next race: 2024 Monaco ePrix
