= 2022–23 Formula E World Championship =

Electric car racing season

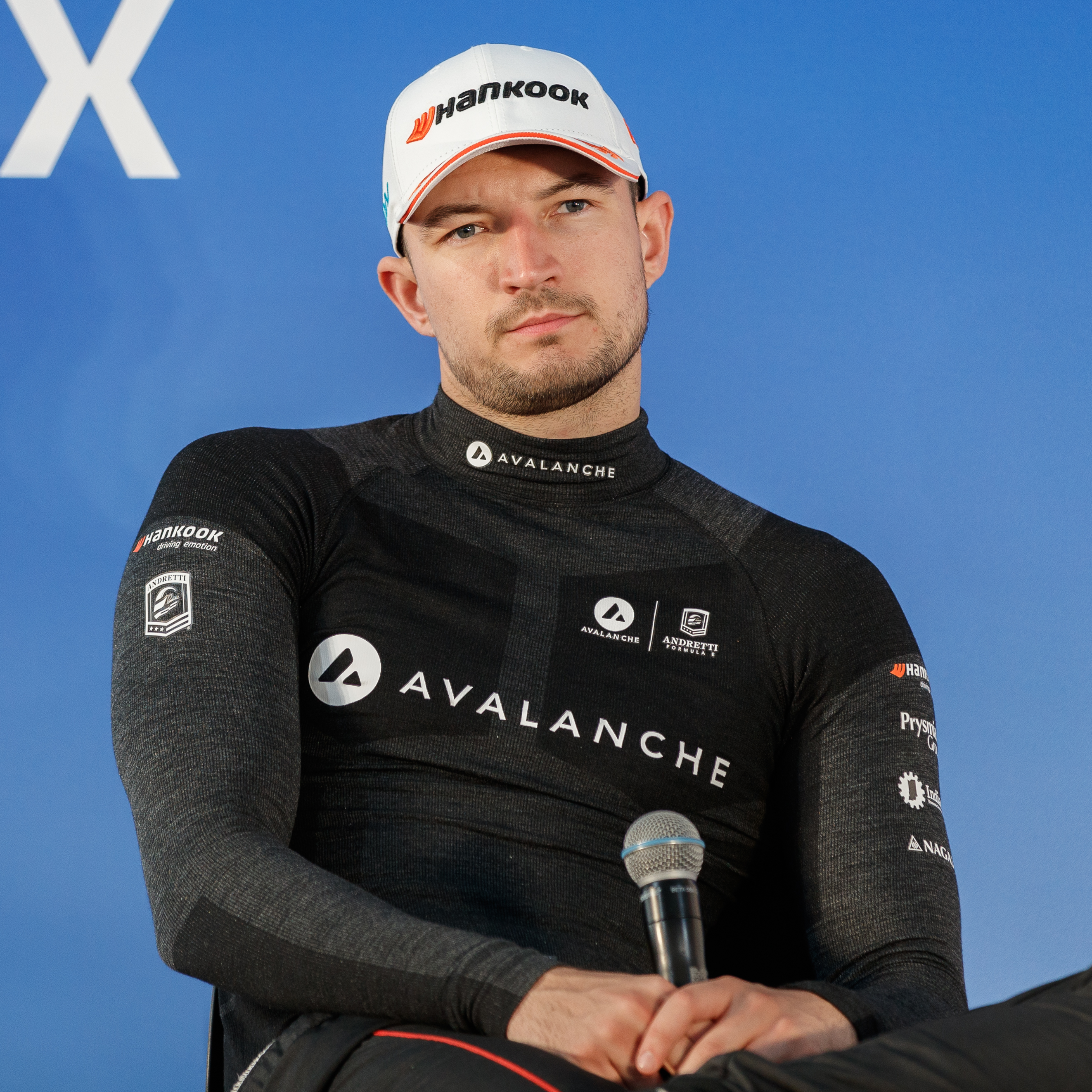
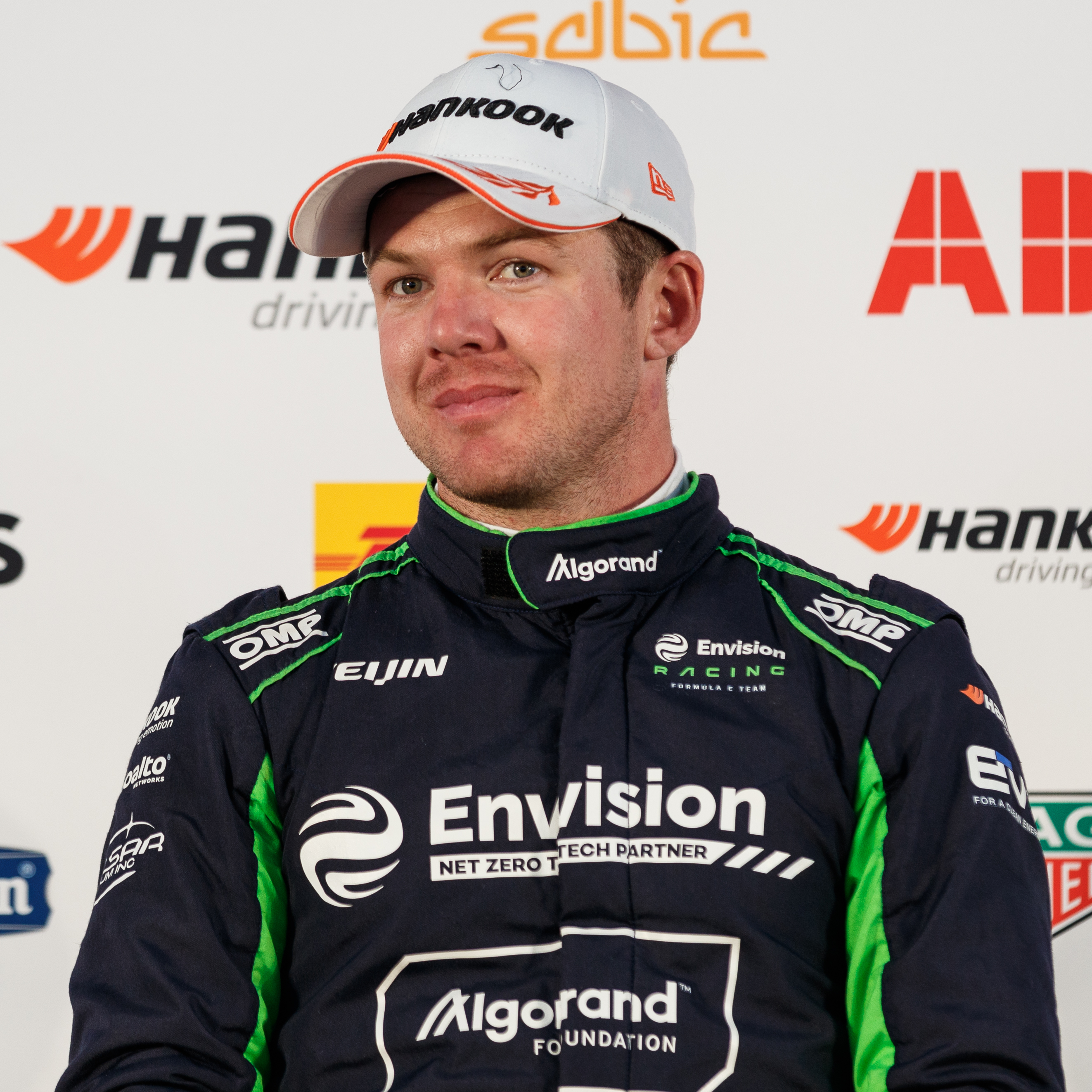
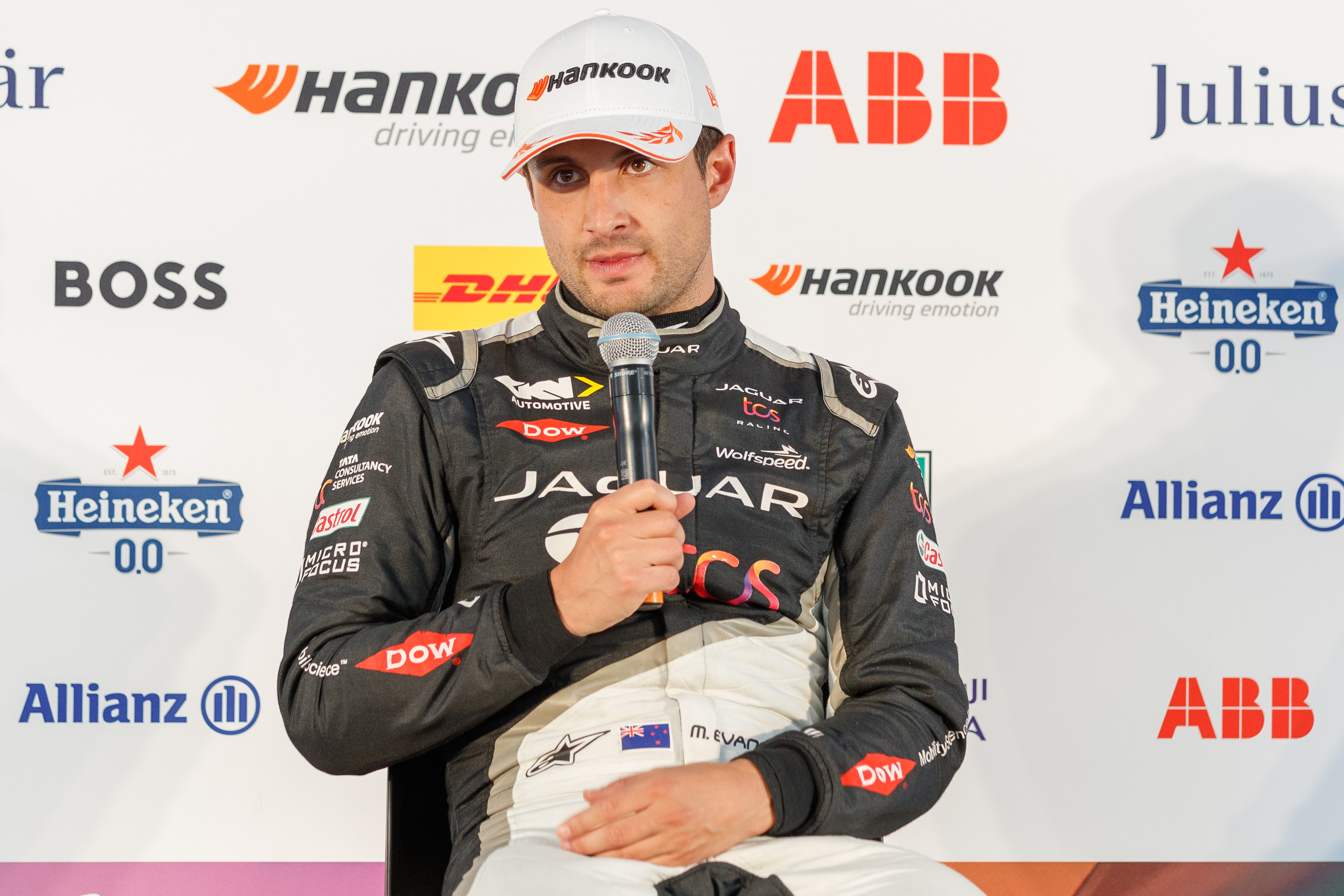
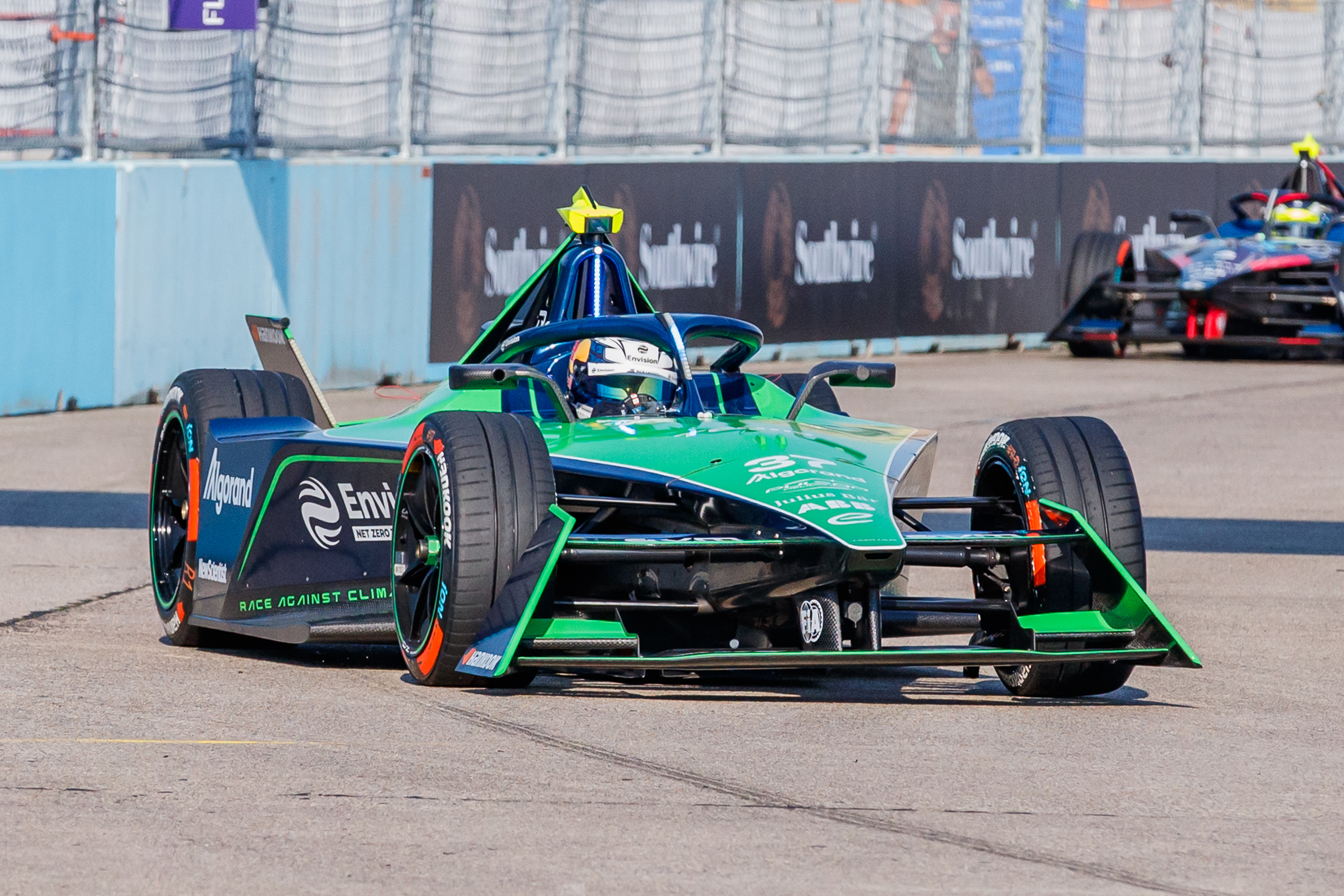
Jake Dennis (top) won his first world championship, driving for Avalanche Andretti. Nick Cassidy (middle left) ended the season as runner-up, while Mitch Evans (middle right) finished third. Envision Racing (bottom) became the first customer team to win the Team's championship.

The 2022–23 ABB FIA Formula E World Championship was the ninth season of the FIA Formula E championship, a motor racing championship for electrically powered vehicles recognised by motorsport's governing body, the Fédération Internationale de l'Automobile (FIA), as the highest class of competition for electric open-wheel racing cars. It saw the debut of the third generation of championship regulations.

The reigning Team's Champions, Mercedes-EQ Formula E Team, did not return to defend the title. Envision Racing superseded them as the new Teams' Champions, clinching the title at the final race, ahead of their engine supplier, Jaguar TCS Racing.

Jake Dennis, driving for Avalanche Andretti Formula E, won his first-ever World Championship with one race to spare in London.

== Teams and drivers ==
All teams used the Formula E Gen3 car on Hankook tyres.

Team	Powertrain	No.	Drivers	Rounds
(France) DS Penske	DS E-Tense FE23	1	(Belgium) Stoffel Vandoorne	All
(France) DS Penske	DS E-Tense FE23	25	(France) Jean-Éric Vergne	All
(China) NIO 333 Racing	NIO 333 ER9	3	(Brazil) Sérgio Sette Câmara	All
(China) NIO 333 Racing	NIO 333 ER9	33	(United Kingdom) Dan Ticktum	All
(Germany) ABT CUPRA Formula E Team	Mahindra M9Electro	4	(Netherlands) Robin Frijns	1, 6–16
(Germany) ABT CUPRA Formula E Team	Mahindra M9Electro	4	(South Africa) Kelvin van der Linde	2–5
(Germany) ABT CUPRA Formula E Team	Mahindra M9Electro	51	(Switzerland) Nico Müller	All
(United Kingdom) NEOM McLaren Formula E Team	Nissan e-4ORCE 04	5	(United Kingdom) Jake Hughes	All
(United Kingdom) NEOM McLaren Formula E Team	Nissan e-4ORCE 04	58	(Germany) René Rast	All
(Monaco) Maserati MSG Racing	Maserati Tipo Folgore (Note: The powertrain is a rebadged DS E-Tense FE23.)	7	(Germany) Maximilian Günther	All
(Monaco) Maserati MSG Racing	Maserati Tipo Folgore	48	(Switzerland) Edoardo Mortara	All
(India) Mahindra Racing	Mahindra M9Electro	8	(United Kingdom) Oliver Rowland	1–9
(India) Mahindra Racing	Mahindra M9Electro	8	(Spain) Roberto Merhi	10–16
(India) Mahindra Racing	Mahindra M9Electro	11	(Brazil) Lucas di Grassi	All
(United Kingdom) Jaguar TCS Racing	Jaguar I-Type 6	9	(New Zealand) Mitch Evans	All
(United Kingdom) Jaguar TCS Racing	Jaguar I-Type 6	10	(United Kingdom) Sam Bird	All
(Germany) TAG Heuer Porsche Formula E Team	Porsche 99X Electric (Note: The 99X Electric branding has been used for every Formula E powertrain developed by Porsche ever since their debut season. This is the third powertrain.)	13	(Portugal) António Félix da Costa	All
(Germany) TAG Heuer Porsche Formula E Team	Porsche 99X Electric	94	(Germany) Pascal Wehrlein	All
(United Kingdom) Envision Racing	Jaguar I-Type 6	16	(Switzerland) Sébastien Buemi	All
(United Kingdom) Envision Racing	Jaguar I-Type 6	37	(New Zealand) Nick Cassidy	All
(Japan) Nissan Formula E Team	Nissan e-4ORCE 04	17	(France) Norman Nato	All
(Japan) Nissan Formula E Team	Nissan e-4ORCE 04	23	(France) Sacha Fenestraz	All
(United States) Avalanche Andretti Formula E	Porsche 99X Electric	27	(United Kingdom) Jake Dennis	All
(United States) Avalanche Andretti Formula E	Porsche 99X Electric	36	(Germany) André Lotterer	1–9, 12–16
(United States) Avalanche Andretti Formula E	Porsche 99X Electric	36	(Germany) David Beckmann	10–11

=== Team changes ===
- Mercedes-EQ left the championship after competing for three seasons and winning the drivers and constructors titles in the 2020–21 and 2021–22 seasons. Their entry and assets were purchased by McLaren. This new entry used Nissan powertrains.
- On 10 January 2022, Maserati announced they would be joining Formula E in the 2022–23 season, becoming the first Italian manufacturer in the series. It was later announced in April 2022 that Maserati had agreed a multi-year partnership with ROKiT Venturi Racing. It was the first time that Maserati was a constructor in formula racing since leaving Formula 1 in the 1950s
- In April 2022, Nissan announced they would take a complete ownership of the e.dams team from Charles Pic (who acquired DAMS from the Drio brothers earlier in the year), rebranding the team to the Nissan Formula E Team.
- In May 2022, ABT Sportsline, one of the old Audi team's key partners, announced they would return to the series with Extreme E partner Cupra under the name ABT CUPRA Formula E Team using Mahindra powertrains.
- DS and Techeetah announced the end of their relationship after four seasons. DS would instead partner up with Penske (one of the partners of the former Dragon team). Techeetah missed the 2022–23 season, with a view to returning to the grid for the 2023–24 season.

=== Driver changes ===
- On 25 June 2022, TAG Heuer Porsche driver André Lotterer announced he would not return to the Formula E championship in 2023 as he was opting for a seat in the World Endurance Championship with Porsche in the LMDh Hypercar category. On 6 September 2022, it was announced that he would replace departing Oliver Askew at Avalanche Andretti.
- On 7 July 2022, Alexander Sims announced he would not return to the Formula E championship in 2023. On 12 August 2022, his replacement was announced to be Lucas di Grassi, switching from ROKiT Venturi Racing to partner Oliver Rowland.
- On 15 August 2022, António Félix da Costa announced his switch from DS Techeetah to TAG Heuer Porsche Formula E Team, replacing André Lotterer.
- On 23 August 2022, Nissan announced an all-new driver lineup, consisting of Sacha Fenestraz, who debuted in the 2022 season finale for Dragon, and Norman Nato, a Formula E race-winner who last raced for Jaguar.
- On 23 August 2022, McLaren announced René Rast's return to Formula E. He last competed for Audi Sport ABT Schaeffler in the 2020–2021 season.
- On 24 August 2022, ABT CUPRA announced their driver pairing of Nico Müller, who competed for Dragon in the 6th and 7th Formula E seasons, and Robin Frijns, who left the Envision team.
- On 6 September 2022, Avalanche Andretti announced the signing of André Lotterer, who was initially set to leave Formula E to race exclusively in the World Endurance Championship.
- On 14 September 2022, NIO 333 announced Sérgio Sette Câmara's switch from Dragon Racing replacing Oliver Turvey, who became sporting advisor and reserve driver for DS Penske.
- On 4 October 2022, Envision Racing announced Sébastien Buemi's switch from Nissan after eight seasons.
- On 8 October 2022, Nyck de Vries announced that he had signed with Scuderia AlphaTauri for the 2023 Formula One World Championship, ruling him out for a seat in Formula E.
- On 12 October 2022, Stoffel Vandoorne and Jean-Éric Vergne were announced to be the driver pairing for the newly formed DS Penske partnership. Antonio Giovinazzi, who raced for Penske in the previous season, left the championship after one season.
- On 3 November 2022, the Maserati MSG team announced that Maximilian Günther would be joining the team after leaving Nissan.
- On 29 November 2022, McLaren announced that Jake Hughes would be joining the team after previously being the full-time reserve and development driver for Mercedes-EQ.

=== Mid-season changes ===
ABT CUPRA driver Robin Frijns sustained a wrist fracture on the opening lap of the Mexico City ePrix, leaving him unable to compete in the Diriyah, Hyderabad and Cape Town ePrixs. He was replaced by touring car and GT racer Kelvin van der Linde, who made his Formula E debut after testing for Audi in 2020. Frijns returned to the team for the São Paulo ePrix.

André Lotterer missed the Jakarta double-header as he attended the 24 Hours of Le Mans test day held across the same weekend. He was replaced by Formula 2 and Porsche reserve driver David Beckmann.

After the Monaco ePrix, Oliver Rowland parted ways with the Mahindra team in a mutual agreement. Replacing him for the rest of the season was Roberto Merhi, who made his Formula E debut at Jakarta.

== Calendar ==
The following ePrix were contracted to form a part of the 2022–23 Formula E World Championship:

Round	ePrix	Country	Circuit	Date
1	Hankook Mexico City ePrix	Mexico	Autódromo Hermanos Rodríguez	14 January 2023
2	CORE Diriyah ePrix	Saudi Arabia	Riyadh Street Circuit	27 January 2023
3	CORE Diriyah ePrix	Saudi Arabia	Riyadh Street Circuit	28 January 2023
4	Greenko Hyderabad ePrix	India	Hyderabad Street Circuit	11 February 2023
5	Cape Town ePrix	South Africa	Cape Town Street Circuit	25 February 2023
6	Julius Baer São Paulo ePrix	Brazil	São Paulo Street Circuit	25 March 2023
7	SABIC Berlin ePrix	Germany	Tempelhof Airport Street Circuit	22 April 2023
8	SABIC Berlin ePrix	Germany	Tempelhof Airport Street Circuit	23 April 2023
9	Monaco ePrix	Monaco	Circuit de Monaco	6 May 2023
10	Gulavit Jakarta ePrix	Indonesia	Jakarta International e-Prix Circuit	3 June 2023
11	Gulavit Jakarta ePrix	Indonesia	Jakarta International e-Prix Circuit	4 June 2023
12	Southwire Portland ePrix	United States	Portland International Raceway	24 June 2023
13	Hankook Rome ePrix	Italy	Circuito Cittadino dell'EUR	15 July 2023
14	Hankook Rome ePrix	Italy	Circuito Cittadino dell'EUR	16 July 2023
15	Hankook London ePrix	United Kingdom	ExCeL London	29 July 2023
16	Hankook London ePrix	United Kingdom	ExCeL London	30 July 2023

While it was originally planned to return to the format of starting the season at the end of a year and running until the European summer, the championship remained with a start early in the year for the third season running.

=== Location changes ===
- The Mexico City ePrix became the season opener for the first time ever, taking over from the Diriyah ePrix.
- The Hyderabad ePrix joined the calendar after signing a letter of intent in January 2022. It was the first FIA World Championship event in India since the 2013 Indian Grand Prix.
- The São Paulo ePrix was introduced after having already placed an unsuccessful bid for the 2017–18 season.
- The Seoul ePrix was originally planned to be held on a revised layout of the Seoul Street Circuit due to the redevelopment of the Jamsil Stadium area, but was then not part of the updated calendar.
- The Jakarta ePrix, which debuted in 2022, became a double-header event.
- The Marrakesh ePrix did not return for the season, as its appearance on the 2021–22 calendar was only to substitute for the cancelled Vancouver round.
- The Cape Town ePrix was introduced after it was originally scheduled to debut in the 2021–22 season.
- The Paris ePrix was due to return to the calendar after being left out of the 2021–22 calendar due to the COVID-19 pandemic, but was not included in the schedule.
- The round held in the United States moved from the Brooklyn Street Circuit in New York City to Portland International Raceway in Oregon. The layout of the 3.166 km circuit was slightly modified.

=== ePrix locations ===
Location of ePrix in 2023
(ePrix – single race)
(ePrix – double header)

== Regulation changes ==
=== Technical changes ===
The championship began its third generation of technical regulations. This saw the introduction of a completely new car, with the new chassis again built by Spark Racing Technology. The cars were now powered by two powertrains, with a second one added to the front axle, increasing the maximum power output from 250 kW to 600 kW. This new car was the smallest and lightest car ever used in the championship, with its weight being reduced by 60 kg. Increased power and reduced weight saw maximum speeds climb to over 320 km/h. The addition of a second powertrain increased regenerative ability from 25% to 40%, enough that the new cars had no hydraulic rear brakes. The tyre supplier changed from Michelin to Hankook.

=== Sporting changes ===
In addition to the new car, a number of race format changes were also made. The format returned to races run to a set number of laps instead of a fixed time, with safety cars and full course cautions increasing the laps needed to finish the race. Fanboost was also discontinued.

Fast recharging was planned be tested in select races under a so-called "attack charge" format. During an attack charge race, each driver would have been required to pit for a recharge during the course of the race, but to compensate for this, drivers who pitted would have received two additional attack mode activation periods. However, these plans did not materialize.

Originally, each team was to be required to run a rookie driver during at least two practice sessions within the season. Several teams criticized this rule: They feared that the tight race weekend schedule would leave drivers unprepared after just a single practice session and criticized the potentially high impact a crash by a rookie could have. The rule was eventually revoked. Instead, two extra sessions only for rookie drivers were added on Friday before the Rome ePrix and on Monday after the Berlin ePrix.

== Season report ==
=== Opening rounds ===
The third generation of Formula E began in January in Mexico City with Lucas di Grassi taking pole position on his debut for Mahindra Racing ahead Andretti's Jake Dennis. Di Grassi led away at the start, before the race was interrupted twice: ABT CUPRA's Robin Frijns ran into the back of Norman Nato's Nissan, putting them both out of the race and breaking Frijns' wrist, before Sam Bird's Jaguar stopped to bring out another safety car. Dennis would take the lead off di Grassi on lap 12, building a gap before a third safety car was called when Edoardo Mortara lost control of his Maserati and hit the wall. Di Grassi could not pose a threat to Dennis on the restart, instead falling further back behind Porsche's Pascal Wehrlein. The German was also unable to close up to Dennis, who won the race by 7.8 seconds. Di Grassi put on a stern defense against McLaren's Jake Hughes to hold on to third place.

At the Diriyah double-header, Kelvin van der Linde made his Formula E debut as a substitute for the injured Frijns. Envision's Sébastien Buemi took pole position in the first race ahead of Hughes and Bird. Bird soon overtook Hughes and then took the lead from Buemi on lap 7. The man with the best start was Wehrlein, however: starting in ninth, he made up three places on the opening lap, and then continued his climb to end up behind second-placed Buemi by lap 23. The German soon left the Swiss behind and started to work on race leader Bird. One unsuccessful attempt and four laps of good defending by Bird later, Wehrlein was able to take the lead. Championship leader Dennis too had a great race, starting eleventh and managing to work his way up the order. He also got by Bird to take second, but was then unable to find a way past Wehrlein. Only Dennis' fastest lap point in Mexico City separated him from Wehrlein, who was second in the standings.

Hughes took his maiden pole position for the second Diriyah race, ahead of Jaguar's Mitch Evans and his McLaren teammate René Rast. The top three each led the race for a stretch during the opening part of the race, before Wehrlein was once again making the most of his Porsche powertrain's superior efficiency. He ticked off Hughes and Evans on lap 12 and 13, before Rast relinquished the lead to him when he took his Attack Mode. Dennis, who had started behind Wehrlein in sixth, followed him through to once again end up in second place. The gaps were then nullified as a safety car was called when ABT Cupra's Nico Müller hit the wall on lap 27. Wehrlein held off Dennis at the restart and then remained unchallenged until the finish to sweep both race wins and take the championship lead by six points, while Rast in third mounted a brilliant defense against Bird to take his teams' first Formula E podium.

The next round, the inaugural Hyderabad ePrix, saw Evans take pole position ahead of DS Penske's Jean-Éric Vergne. Evans dropped back to third behind Vergne and Buemi early on after a mistimed attack mode activation. He then was in the wrong place at the wrong time when his teammate Bird attempted a move on the Nissan of Sacha Fenestraz on lap 13, outbraked himself and hit Evans, forcing both Jaguars to retire. Among the chaos, Envision's Nick Cassidy was able to rise to third place. Vergne took the lead from Buemi on lap 15 and Cassidy followed him through. Another safety car, caused by Hughes, whose mirror had come loose and lodged in his steering wheel, causing him to hit the wall, delayed the fight for the win. Despite having more energy than Vergne in the final part of the race, Cassidy had to settle for second. Buemi came home third, before receiving a penalty that promoted Porsche's António Félix da Costa to the podium. Wehrlein in fourth grew his championship advantage over a non-finishing Dennis to 18 points.

Formula E made its debut in Cape Town for round 5. Fenestraz took his maiden pole position in Formula E, ahead of Maserati's Maximilian Günther. All four Mahindra-powered cars had to be withdrawn from the race as the manufacturer saw safety concerns with their rear suspension package. An early safety car because of Wehrlein crashing into Buemi saw Günther move into the lead, before Cassidy was next to take first spot. Günther clipped a wall on lap 21, forcing him to retire and elevating Da Costa and Vergne into contention. On lap 24, Da Costa pulled off a remarkable overtake on Cassidy for the lead. He then missed his attack mode activation, dropped behind Vergne and was able to pull the same brilliant move on Vergne to retake the lead and hold on for the win. Cassidy took the last podium place after Fenestraz crashed out on the final lap. With Wehrlein retiring and Dennis down in 13th after a penalty, Wehrlein's championship lead remained the same.

=== Mid-season rounds ===
The São Paulo ePrix, round 6, marked the third new ePrix in succession. As Frijns returned to ABT CUPRA from his injury, reigning champion Stoffel Vandoorne took his first pole position for DS Penske. A very energy-limited race saw multiple lead changes in the first half of the race, with drivers taking attack modes just to avoid leading the race and missing out on the slipstream. Vandoorne lost out, as he led too much and eventually had a big energy deficit, while Cassidy and Evans took advantage of that. Evans would take the lead from Cassidy on lap 32, holding off last-lap challenges from Cassidy and Bird to take his and Jaguar's first victory of the season. Championship leader Wehrlein had started 18th and was able to come home seventh, despite colliding with championship rival Dennis after the latter was hit by NIO 333's Dan Ticktum. This forced Dennis into retirement. With Dennis not scoring for the third consecutive race, Wehrlein extended his championship lead to 24 points.

It was back to familiar surroundings for rounds 7 and 8 as the Berlin double-header was up next. Buemi took his 16th pole position, a new Formula E record, but was beaten at the start by Ticktum rocketing from fourth on the grid into the lead. While Ticktum slowly faded back in his inferior NIO, drivers were once again not keen to lead the race, preferring to drop back into the slipstream. The race was interrupted multiple times by crashes causing safety cars. One of these again involved Dennis, this time he hit the wall when he attempted to pass Günther for fifth place. This allowed the top four led by Buemi to build a slight gap. Evans was able to pass Buemi for the lead on lap 40, with both Bird and Günther also coming through on the final lap to complete a Jaguar 1-2 and the podium. Wehrlein came sixth, and with Dennis' fourth non-score in a row, he was overtaken in the standings by Cassidy, who came fifth to reduce the gap to Wehrlein to 23 points.

The second Berlin race saw a wet qualifying that ended with a surprise ABT CUPRA front-row lockout, with Frijns ahead of Müller. The race was delayed because of protestors storming the grid, but when it got underway, the ABT CUPRAs were unable to keep up with the other leading cars and soon dropped back. While initially seemed to again be a race where leading was not the best strategy, Cassidy made just that work. He started eighth and was soon in the lead group, took first place on lap 25 and led until the end. Behind him was Dennis who scored his first points since Diriyah in January. Vergne completed the podium, but had to fight for it past Evans and Da Costa in the final stages of the race. Müller managed to salvage two points in ninth place, while polesitter Frijns fell back to seventeenth. With Wehrlein coming home in seventh, the gap between him and Cassidy in the standings was shortened to just four points.

The Monaco ePrix began with Fenestraz on pole position, before a deletion of his lap time handed that to Hughes. He initially led away from Fenestraz, before Evans took the lead from the pair after the first round of attack mode activations that saw Hughes drop down to fifth. Meanwhile, Cassidy was working his way up the order after starting from ninth. He overtook the three cars of Dennis, Wehrlein and Günther into the hairpin on lap four, before taking the lead from Evans during the second round of attack modes. A late safety car to retrieve Günther's stopped car resulted in a flat-out five-lap sprint to the end, but Evans could not find a way past Cassidy before another safety car for a collision between Bird and Müller saw the race finish under caution. Cassidy's second consecutive win saw him overtake Wehrlein, who could only manage tenth, in the standings. Third was Dennis, who also closed up to Wehrlein in the standings, while Cassidy was now 20 points ahead.

Two drivers made their debut at Jakarta: David Beckmann as a stand-in for Andretti's André Lotterer, and Roberto Merhi to replace Oliver Rowland at Mahindra. Günther took Maserati's first Formula E pole position ahead of Dennis. Wehrlein in third overtook Dennis right at the start, and then kept close to Günther to take the lead on lap four. After briefly falling to fourth behind Vandoorne, Dennis quickly climbed back to second and remained there as Wehrlein's main threat. These top three positions remained until the end of the race, while down in the lower reaches of the points, the two Jaguars collided again, forcing Evans to retire. Wehrlein took his first win since Saudi Arabia, while Dennis took his seventh podium of the season. Championship leader Cassidy could only manage seventh in an Envision car that lacked pace, so Wehrlein shortened his championship advantage to just two points.

Günther took pole position again for the second race at Jakarta. While he dropped behind both Evans and Dennis during the first round of attack mode activations, he was able to repass Dennis the second time around after the Brit got stuck behind Evans during his second attack mode. Dennis then put pressure on Günther, but was unable to find a way by. Evans took his attack mode later on, but his pace afterwards was no match for the top two. Championship protagonists Cassidy and Wehrlein had a battle further down the order that resulted in the former sustaining damage to his front wing, forcing him to pit for repairs and out of the points. Günther took Maserati's first single seater win since Juan Manuel Fangio won at the Nürburgring in 1957. Dennis secured his fourth podium in a row in second, and Wehrlein came home sixth, enough for him to retake the championship lead by a single point over Dennis. Cassidy dropped to third in the standings, albeit just six points behind Wehrlein.

=== Closing rounds ===
Dennis took pole position as Formula E debuted at the Portland International Raceway. The high-speed nature of the track meant that energy saving once again had top priority, with drivers often lapping more than 10 seconds off the pace in the opening part of the race. Dennis led until his first attack mode activation dropped him behind Nato. Cassidy, who had started tenth, steadily worked his way up the order to claim the lead shortly before the race was interrupted for a heavy crash after a brake failure for Müller. Da Costa then took the lead and started showing more pace in the final part of the race, with only Cassidy and Dennis able to hold on to him. These two were both able to pass Da Costa in the end, with Dennis then finding no way past Cassidy. The New Zealander took his third win of the season and also reclaimed the championship lead over Wehrlein, who could only manage eighth, by 18 points.

Evans scored pole position in the first of the two races in Rome. After a safety car to clear away Lotterers crashed car, Fenestraz took the lead shortly before the race was red-flagged on lap nine after a multi-car shunt. Bird had lost control of his car though the flat-out turn six and hit the wall. His car was hit by Buemi and Mortara, Vandoorne hit the wall trying to avoid the wreckage and Da Costa, Di Grassi and Frijns also sustained damage caused by debris on track. All drivers escaped without injury, and fourteen cars took to the restart led by Fenestraz. Dennis took the lead on lap twelve as Fenestraz started dropping down the order. Evans retook the lead during the second round of attack mode activations. As the race after the red flag was one lap longer than Andretti had initially expected, Dennis was then forced to conserve energy, dropping him behind Cassidy and Günther in fourth. Cassidy grew his championship advantage to 15 points, while Dennis and Evans both overtook Wehrlein in the standings.

Spare parts had to be shared throughout the whole paddock to ensure all cars could take part in the second race. Dennis took pole position and led Cassidy and Evans at the start. On the second lap, Cassidy attempted a move on Dennis. Evans behind him locked up, hit Cassidy and his Jaguar was flung atop Cassidy's Envision. Both drivers continued, but with extensive damage that eventually forced Evans to retire. Nato was second behind Dennis, but clipped the Andretti's rear and sustained damage to his front wing. This saw Bird move past him, where he started putting pressure on the race leader. Bird was unable to find a way by Dennis and dropped back into third when he activated his second attack mode. Despite having more energy, he then did not manage to pass Nato, who held on to second. The result saw Dennis retake the lead of the championship, leading by 24 points from Cassidy ahead of the final weekend. Evans, a further five points back, was also still in mathematical contention for the title.

The final weekend in London began with Evans taking pole position, but a 5-place grid penalty for his crash in Rome meant Cassidy started first. Buemi took second place at the start and Cassidy initially looked set to take the championship fight to Sunday, as Buemi shielded him from behind while he got both attack mode activations out of the way early. But Cassidy let Buemi through to help his team in the teams' championship, and miscommunication between team and drivers led to the teammates hitting each other. Cassidy sustained damage and lost all chance to keep the championship fight alive. The race ended with two red flags in quick succession, first for Fenestraz crashing heavily into turn 16, and then shortly after the first restart when a collision between Nato, Buemi and Bird blocked the track in turn 19. After the second restart, Evans led Da Costa and Dennis home, before Da Costa was given a post-race 3 minute penalty for a technical infraction. Dennis sealed his, his teams' and Great Britain's first Formula E Drivers' World Championship.

The final round of the championship saw Cassidy take his first pole position of the season. The race was heavily delayed because of heavy rain, but once things got underway, Cassidy led from Evans and Nato. The leading pair immediately pulled away from the pack, with no one able to match their pace. Dennis overtook Nato for third place, but was still almost a second per lap slower than Cassidy and Evans. In the final stages of the race, Evans stopped pressuring Cassidy for the lead and also dropped back. Cassidy dominated the rest of the race. His victory secured his runner-up spot in the Drivers' Championship. With his teammate Buemi finishing sixth, Envision Racing's secured their first Teams' Championship, ahead of Jaguar TCS Racing. Newly crowned champion Dennis cruised home to third in a race where, despite very tricky conditions, all 22 cars reached the finish line.

At the start of the season, the Porsche-powered cars seemed the strongest, but as the season progressed, Jaguar and their customer Envision were able to catch up. The picture in the drivers' standings was similar: Dennis and Wehrlein were firmly at the front in the first part of the season, but Cassidy and Evans caught up to the pair while Wehrlein started to fade back. While Evans was never leading the championship, Cassidy was able to overhaul Dennis twice, before the pivotal crash in the second Rome race that put the title initiative back in Dennis' favor. In London, Cassidy and Envision then gambled away their slim chances by trying to win both championships at the same time, while Dennis just had to keep consistent to secure the crown.

== Results and standings ==
=== ePrix ===
Round	Race	Pole position	Fastest lap	Winning driver	Winning team	Report
1	Mexico City	(Brazil) Lucas di Grassi	(United Kingdom) Jake Dennis	(United Kingdom) Jake Dennis	(United States) Avalanche Andretti Formula E	Report
2	(Saudi Arabia) Diriyah	(Switzerland) Sébastien Buemi	(Germany) René Rast	(Germany) Pascal Wehrlein	(Germany) TAG Heuer Porsche Formula E Team	Report
3	(Saudi Arabia) Diriyah	(United Kingdom) Jake Hughes	(United Kingdom) Sam Bird	(Germany) Pascal Wehrlein	(Germany) TAG Heuer Porsche Formula E Team	Report
4	(India) Hyderabad	(New Zealand) Mitch Evans	(Switzerland) Nico Müller (Note: Nico Müller set the fastest lap, but did not finish in the top 10, so was ineligible to be the point-scorer for the fastest lap. Norman Nato was the point-scorer instead for setting the fastest lap of those finishing in the top 10.)	(France) Jean-Éric Vergne	(France) DS Penske	Report
5	(South Africa) Cape Town	(France) Sacha Fenestraz	(France) Jean-Éric Vergne	(Portugal) António Félix da Costa	(Germany) TAG Heuer Porsche Formula E Team	Report
6	(Brazil) São Paulo	(Belgium) Stoffel Vandoorne	(United Kingdom) Sam Bird	(New Zealand) Mitch Evans	(United Kingdom) Jaguar TCS Racing	Report
7	(Germany) Berlin	(Switzerland) Sébastien Buemi	(United Kingdom) Jake Dennis (Note: Jake Dennis set the fastest lap, but did not finish in the top 10, so was ineligible to be the point-scorer for the fastest lap. André Lotterer was the point-scorer instead for setting the fastest lap of those finishing in the top 10.)	(New Zealand) Mitch Evans	(United Kingdom) Jaguar TCS Racing	Report
8	(Germany) Berlin	(Netherlands) Robin Frijns	(Switzerland) Sébastien Buemi (Note: Sébastien Buemi set the fastest lap, but did not finish in the top 10, so was ineligible to be the point-scorer for the fastest lap. Maximilian Gunther was the point-scorer instead for setting the fastest lap of those finishing in the top 10.)	(New Zealand) Nick Cassidy	(United Kingdom) Envision Racing	Report
9	Monaco	(United Kingdom) Jake Hughes	(United Kingdom) Jake Dennis	(New Zealand) Nick Cassidy	(United Kingdom) Envision Racing	Report
10	(Indonesia) Jakarta	(Germany) Maximilian Günther	(Switzerland) Sébastien Buemi (Note: Sébastien Buemi set the fastest lap, but did not finish in the top 10, so was ineligible to be the point-scorer for the fastest lap. Nick Cassidy was the point-scorer instead for setting the fastest lap of those finishing in the top 10.)	(Germany) Pascal Wehrlein	(Germany) TAG Heuer Porsche Formula E Team	Report
11	(Indonesia) Jakarta	(Germany) Maximilian Günther	(United Kingdom) Jake Dennis	(Germany) Maximilian Günther	(Monaco) Maserati MSG Racing	Report
12	(United States) Portland	(United Kingdom) Jake Dennis	(New Zealand) Mitch Evans	(New Zealand) Nick Cassidy	(United Kingdom) Envision Racing	Report
13	(Italy) Rome	(New Zealand) Mitch Evans	(New Zealand) Mitch Evans	(New Zealand) Mitch Evans	(United Kingdom) Jaguar TCS Racing	Report
14	(Italy) Rome	(United Kingdom) Jake Dennis	(France) Jean-Éric Vergne (Note: Jean-Éric Vergne set the fastest lap, but did not finish in the top 10, so was ineligible to be the point-scorer for the fastest lap. Jake Dennis was the point-scorer instead for setting the fastest lap of those finishing in the top 10.)	(United Kingdom) Jake Dennis	(United States) Avalanche Andretti Formula E	Report
15	(United Kingdom) London	(New Zealand) Mitch Evans (Note: Mitch Evans took pole position and the three points associated with it after setting the fastest time in qualifying. Nick Cassidy started the race from first place as Evans served a 5-place grid penalty for causing a collision at the previous race in Rome.)	(Germany) André Lotterer (Note: André Lotterer set the fastest lap, but did not finish in the top 10, so was ineligible to be the point-scorer for the fastest lap. Jake Hughes was the point-scorer instead for setting the fastest lap of those finishing in the top 10.)	(New Zealand) Mitch Evans	(United Kingdom) Jaguar TCS Racing	Report
16	(United Kingdom) London	(New Zealand) Nick Cassidy	(United Kingdom) Jake Dennis	(New Zealand) Nick Cassidy	(United Kingdom) Envision Racing	Report

=== Drivers' Championship ===
Points were awarded using the following structure:

Position	1st	2nd	3rd	4th	5th	6th	7th	8th	9th	10th	Pole	FL
Points	25	18	15	12	10	8	6	4	2	1	3	1

Pos.	Driver	MEX (Mexico)	DRH (Saudi Arabia)		HYD (India)	CPT (South Africa)	SAO (Brazil)	BER (Germany)		MCO (Monaco)	JKT (Indonesia)		POR (United States)	RME (Italy)		LDN (United Kingdom)		Pts
1	(United Kingdom) Jake Dennis	1	2	2	16	13	Ret	18	2	3	2	2	**2**	4	**1**	2	3	229
2	(New Zealand) Nick Cassidy	9	6	13	2	3	2	5	1	1	7	18	1	2	14	Ret	**1**	199
3	(New Zealand) Mitch Evans	8	10	7	**Ret**	11	1	1	4	2	Ret	3	4	**1**	Ret	**1**	2	197
4	(Germany) Pascal Wehrlein	2	1	1	4	Ret	7	6	7	10	1	6	8	9	7	9	10	149
5	(France) Jean-Éric Vergne	12	7	16	1	2	5	7	3	7	5	16	11	5	15	Ret	22	107
6	(Switzerland) Sébastien Buemi	6	**4**	6	15	5	10	**4**	20	8	20	10	5	Ret	5	3	6	105
7	(Germany) Maximilian Günther	11	WD	19	13	Ret	11	3	6	Ret	**3**	**1**	6	3	6	12	14	101
8	(United Kingdom) Sam Bird	Ret	3	4	Ret	DNS	3	2	19	16	21	DNS	17	Ret	3	4	7	95
9	(Portugal) António Félix da Costa	7	18	11	3	1	4	Ret	5	15	8	7	3	Ret	12	16	16	93
10	(France) Norman Nato	Ret	12	14	7	8	Ret	13	16	18	12	5	9	7	2	8	4	63
11	(Belgium) Stoffel Vandoorne	10	11	20	8	7	**6**	Ret	8	9	4	9	12	11	8	11	5	56
12	(United Kingdom) Jake Hughes	5	8	**5**	Ret	10	8	Ret	18	**5**	10	Ret	18	DNS	11	10	19	48
13	(Germany) René Rast	Ret	5	3	Ret	4	9	17	13	17	15	15	14	Ret	13	14	12	40
14	(Switzerland) Edoardo Mortara	Ret	Ret	9	10	Ret	Ret	9	Ret	11	6	8	Ret	Ret	4	5	11	39
15	(Brazil) Lucas di Grassi	**3**	13	15	14	WD	13	11	12	12	14	14	7	Ret	Ret	6	18	32
16	(France) Sacha Fenestraz	15	17	8	12	**NC**	Ret	12	11	4	19	4	15	10	16	Ret	15	32
17	(United Kingdom) Dan Ticktum	17	14	10	Ret	6	17	Ret	10	6	13	11	13	13	9	7	9	28
18	(Germany) André Lotterer	4	9	12	9	9	12	8	21	Ret			19	Ret	Ret	12	21	23
19	(Switzerland) Nico Müller	14	Ret	Ret	11	WD	Ret	15	9	Ret	11	12	Ret	6	10	Ret	8	15
20	(Brazil) Sérgio Sette Câmara	16	15	17	5	12	16	16	15	14	17	DNS	16	8	Ret	DSQ	13	14
21	(United Kingdom) Oliver Rowland	13	19	Ret	6	WD	15	10	14	Ret								9
22	(Netherlands) Robin Frijns	Ret					14	14	**17**	13	9	13	10	Ret	Ret	Ret	17	6
23	(Spain) Roberto Merhi										18	17	Ret	12	Ret	15	20	0
24	(South Africa) Kelvin van der Linde		16	18	Ret	WD												0
25	(Germany) David Beckmann										16	Ret						0
Pos.	Driver	MEX (Mexico)	DRH (Saudi Arabia)		HYD (India)	CPT (South Africa)	SAO (Brazil)	BER (Germany)		MCO (Monaco)	JKT (Indonesia)		POR (United States)	RME (Italy)		LDN (United Kingdom)		Pts

Colour	Result
Gold	Winner
Silver	Second place
Bronze	Third place
Green	Points classification
Blue	Non-points classification
Blue	Non-classified finish (NC)
Purple	Retired, not classified (Ret)
Red	Did not qualify (DNQ)
Red	Did not pre-qualify (DNPQ)
Black	Disqualified (DSQ)
White	Did not start (DNS)
White	Withdrew (WD)
White	Race cancelled (C)
Blank	Did not practice (DNP)
Blank	Did not arrive (DNA)
Blank	Excluded (EX)

**Bold** – Pole

Italics – Fastest lap

=== Teams' Championship ===
Pos.	Team	No.	MEX (Mexico)	DRH (Saudi Arabia)		HYD (India)	CPT (South Africa)	SAO (Brazil)	BER (Germany)		MCO (Monaco)	JKT (Indonesia)		POR (United States)	RME (Italy)		LDN (United Kingdom)		Pts
1	(United Kingdom) Envision Racing	16	6	**4**	6	15	5	10	**4**	20	8	20	10	5	Ret	5	3	6	304
1	(United Kingdom) Envision Racing	37	9	6	13	2	3	2	5	1	1	7	18	1	2	14	Ret	**1**	304
2	(United Kingdom) Jaguar TCS Racing	9	8	10	7	**Ret**	11	1	1	4	2	Ret	3	4	**1**	Ret	**1**	2	292
2	(United Kingdom) Jaguar TCS Racing	10	Ret	3	4	Ret	DNS	3	2	19	16	21	DNS	17	Ret	3	4	7	292
3	(United States) Avalanche Andretti Formula E	27	1	2	2	16	13	Ret	18	2	3	2	2	**2**	4	**1**	2	3	252
3	(United States) Avalanche Andretti Formula E	36	4	9	12	9	9	12	8	21	Ret	16	Ret	19	Ret	Ret	13	21	252
4	(Germany) TAG Heuer Porsche Formula E Team	13	7	18	11	3	1	4	Ret	5	15	8	7	3	Ret	12	16	16	242
4	(Germany) TAG Heuer Porsche Formula E Team	94	2	1	1	4	Ret	7	6	7	10	1	6	8	9	7	9	10	242
5	(France) DS Penske	1	10	11	20	8	7	**6**	Ret	8	9	4	9	12	11	8	11	5	163
5	(France) DS Penske	25	12	7	16	1	2	5	7	3	7	5	16	11	5	15	Ret	22	163
6	(Monaco) Maserati MSG Racing	7	11	WD	19	13	Ret	11	3	6	Ret	**3**	**1**	6	3	6	12	14	140
6	(Monaco) Maserati MSG Racing	48	Ret	Ret	9	10	Ret	Ret	9	Ret	11	6	8	Ret	Ret	4	5	11	140
7	(Japan) Nissan Formula E Team	17	Ret	12	14	7	8	Ret	13	16	18	12	5	9	7	2	8	4	95
7	(Japan) Nissan Formula E Team	23	15	17	8	12	**NC**	Ret	12	11	4	19	4	15	10	16	Ret	15	95
8	(United Kingdom) NEOM McLaren Formula E Team	5	5	8	**5**	Ret	10	8	Ret	18	**5**	10	Ret	18	DNS	11	10	19	88
8	(United Kingdom) NEOM McLaren Formula E Team	58	Ret	5	3	Ret	4	9	17	13	17	15	15	14	Ret	13	14	12	88
9	(China) NIO 333 Racing	3	16	15	17	5	12	16	16	15	14	17	DNS	16	8	Ret	DSQ	13	42
9	(China) NIO 333 Racing	33	17	14	10	Ret	6	17	Ret	10	6	13	11	13	13	9	7	9	42
10	(India) Mahindra Racing	8	13	19	Ret	6	WD	15	10	14	Ret	18	17	Ret	12	Ret	15	20	41
10	(India) Mahindra Racing	11	**3**	13	15	14	WD	13	11	12	12	14	14	7	Ret	Ret	6	18	41
11	(Germany) ABT CUPRA Formula E Team	4	Ret	16	18	Ret	WD	14	14	**17**	13	9	13	10	Ret	Ret	Ret	17	21
11	(Germany) ABT CUPRA Formula E Team	51	14	Ret	Ret	11	WD	Ret	15	9	Ret	11	12	Ret	6	10	Ret	8	21
Pos.	Team	No.	MEX (Mexico)	DRH (Saudi Arabia)		HYD (India)	CPT (South Africa)	SAO (Brazil)	BER (Germany)		MCO (Monaco)	JKT (Indonesia)		POR (United States)	RME (Italy)		LDN (United Kingdom)		Pts
