= Maserati MSG Racing =

Monegasque Formula E team

(Monaco) Maserati MSG Racing
- Founded: 2022
- Folded: 2025
- Base: Monaco
- Former series: Formula E
- Noted drivers: (Germany) Maximilian Günther (Switzerland) Edoardo Mortara (Belgium) Stoffel Vandoorne (United Kingdom) Jake Hughes
- Races: 48
- Wins: 3
- Podiums: 8
- Poles: 2
- Fastest laps: 1
- Points: 323
- First entry: 2023 Mexico City ePrix
- Last entry: 2025 London ePrix
- First win: 2023 Jakarta ePrix
- Last win: 2025 Tokyo ePrix – Race 1
- Website: www.maseratimsgracing.com

Maserati MSG Racing was a Monegasque racing team that competed in the FIA Formula E World Championship. The team previously competed under the Venturi Racing name from 2014–2022. The team was renamed to Citroën Racing Formula E Team from the 2025–26 season.

== History ==
After eight seasons on the Formula E grid, the new owners of Venturi Racing led by Chairman Scott Swid renamed the team Monaco Sports Group for the 2022-2023 season. The team announced a title and powertrain partnership with Maserati in April 2022, after the luxury automotive manufacturer announced it would join Formula E for Season 9 in January 2022.

The team used powertrains designed and developed by Maserati and DS Automobiles parent company, Stellantis, as part of a regulation change for the 2023 season, allowing automotive brands from the same ownership group to share a powertrain.

The team was controlled and operated by MSG Racing from its headquarters in Monaco. The 2022–23 season marked the return of the Maserati brand to single-seater competition for the first time 65 years, after last competing in Formula One in 1957.

=== 2022–23 season ===
On 3 November 2022, the team confirmed that Edoardo Mortara would remain with the organisation for a sixth successive season and would be joined by Formula E’s youngest race winner, Maximilian Günther for the 2022–23 Formula E World Championship. Former professional racing driver and ex-DS Techeetah Sporting Director, James Rossiter, joined as Team Principal.

After unveiling its Gen3 car, the Maserati Tipo Folgore – named after the Maserati Tipo 26 and the marque’s electric automotive range, Folgore – in Modena, Italy, the team enjoyed a successful pre-season test at the Circuit Ricardo Tormo with Günther setting the fastest time.

The team scored its first points of the season in Race Two of the 2023 Diriyah ePrix and returned to the top 10 in Hyderabad but failed to score points in Cape Town and São Paulo after running in podium contention.

At the 2023 Berlin ePrix, Günther finished in third place to score the Maserati brand’s first podium in World Championship single-seater motorsport since Juan Manuel Fangio's second place at the 1957 Italian Grand Prix. A breakthrough weekend in Berlin commenced a strong second half to the team’s season, with Günther scoring double pole positions and podiums, and a race victory in Jakarta – Maserati’s first win since the 1957 German Grand Prix. He later returned to the podium in Rome.

With four podiums to his name, Günther finished seventh in the World Drivers’ Championship with 101 points while with a best finish of fourth in Rome, Mortara was 14th in the standings with 39 points. Together, with 140 points, Maserati MSG Racing finished sixth in the World Teams’ Championship.

=== 2023–24 season ===
On 15 September 2023, it was confirmed that Mortara would leave the team after six seasons. He was replaced by Jehan Daruvala who joined Formula E from Formula 2 while Günther remained for a second season.

The team started Season 10 with a fourth-placed finish in Mexico City, courtesy of Günther, and secured further top-10 finishes in Diriyah, where Daruvala made his first qualifying duel appearance. In São Paulo, Günther received two 20-place grid penalties for a gearbox and inverter change, the latter of which was converted to a 10-second stop-go penalty in the race. Despite this, Günther finished ninth after gaining 13 places.

Günther secured his and the team's only win of the 2023–24 season at the 2024 Tokyo ePrix – Formula E's first race in Japan.

=== 2024–25 season ===
On 26 July 2024, Maximilian Günther and Jehan Daruvala leave Maserati MSG Racing for the 2024–25, replaced by Stoffel Vandoorne and Jake Hughes that join Maserati MSG Racing for Season 11. Cyril Blais, who lead the team to race victories as Chief Engineer has been promoted to Team Principal.

Vandoorne secured his and the team's only win of the 2024–25 season at race 1 of the 2025 Tokyo ePrix, also marked the final race victory of the team.

== Racing results ==
=== Formula E ===
(key) (Races in bold indicate pole position)

2014–22: Venturi Racing
Year	Chassis	Powertrain	Tyres	No.	Drivers	1	2	3	4	5	6	7	8	9	10	11	12	13	14	15	16	Points	T.C.
Maserati MSG Racing
2022–23	Formula E Gen3	Maserati Tipo Folgore	H			MEX	DIR		HYD	CPT	SPL	BER		MCO	JAK		PRT	RME		LDN		140	6th
2022–23	Formula E Gen3	Maserati Tipo Folgore	H	7	(Germany) Maximilian Günther	11	WD	19	13	Ret	11	3	6	Ret	**3**	**1**	6	3	6	12	14	140	6th
2022–23	Formula E Gen3	Maserati Tipo Folgore	H	48	(Switzerland) Edoardo Mortara	Ret	Ret	9	10	Ret	Ret	9	22	11	6	8	20	Ret	4	5	11	140	6th
2023–24	Formula E Gen3	Maserati Tipo Folgore	H			MEX	DIR		SAP	TOK	MIS		MCO	BER		SHA		POR		LDN		81	8th
2023–24	Formula E Gen3	Maserati Tipo Folgore	H	7	(Germany) Maximilian Günther	4	7	9	9	1	3	12	9	Ret	Ret	21	8	Ret	8	Ret	Ret	81	8th
2023–24	Formula E Gen3	Maserati Tipo Folgore	H	18	(India) Jehan Daruvala	16	20	Ret	15	17	Ret	9	20	17	7	19	17	16	12	18	Ret	81	8th
2024–25	Formula E Gen3 Evo	Maserati Tipo Folgore	H			SAP	MEX	JED		MIA	MCO		TOK		SHA		JAK	BER		LDN		102	9th
2024–25	Formula E Gen3 Evo	Maserati Tipo Folgore	H	2	(Belgium) Stoffel Vandoorne	10	7	10	6	18	9	10	1	19	11	7	Ret	12	13	4	12	102	9th
2024–25	Formula E Gen3 Evo	Maserati Tipo Folgore	H	55	(United Kingdom) Jake Hughes	Ret	10	5	3	Ret	16	17	19	18	16	4	Ret	14	10	Ret	17	102	9th
2025–26: Citroën Racing
