= 2023 Hyderabad ePrix =

Race 4 of 16 of the 2022–23 Formula E season
← Previous race	Next race →
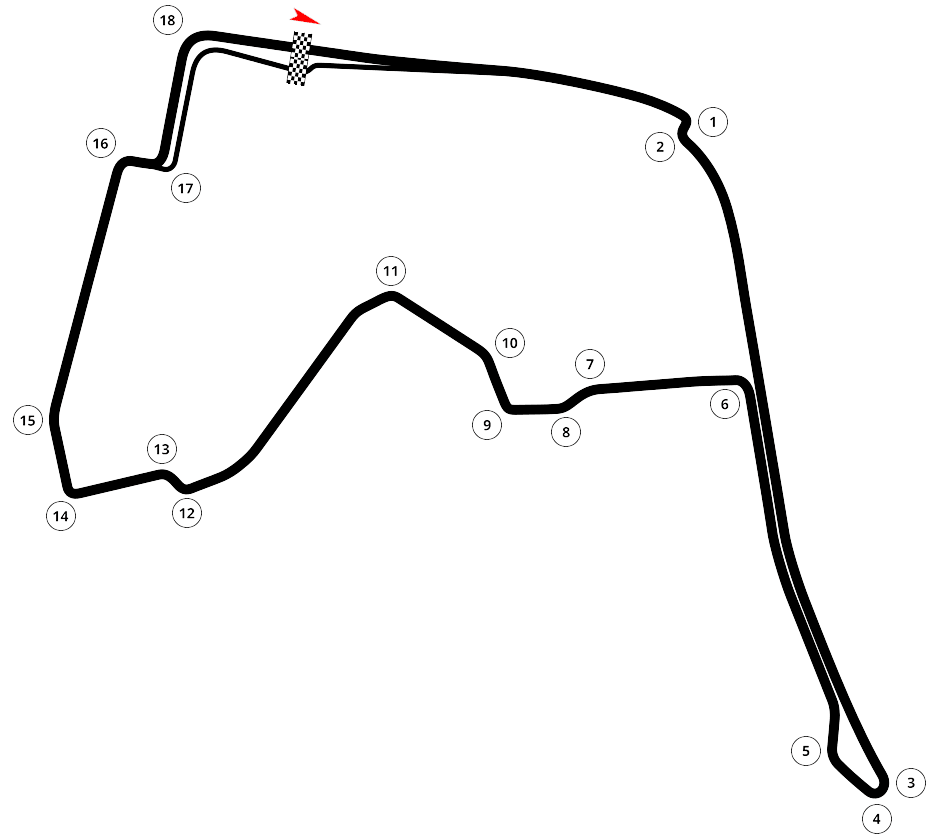

Race details
- Date: 11 February 2023
- Official name: 2023 Greenko Hyderabad ePrix
- Location: Hyderabad Street Circuit, Hyderabad, Telangana, India
- Course: Street Circuit
- Course length: 2.835 km (1.762 mi)
- Distance: 33 (Note: 32 planned laps and 1 extra lap) laps, 93.555 km (58.132 mi)
- Scheduled distance: 32 laps, 90.720 km (56.371 mi)
- Attendance: 31,000

Pole position
Driver	(New Zealand) Mitch Evans	Jaguar
- Time: 1:13.228

Fastest lap
Driver	(France) Norman Nato	Nissan
- Time: 1:14.698 on lap 28

Podium
First	(France) Jean-Éric Vergne	DS
Second	(New Zealand) Nick Cassidy	Envision-Jaguar
Third	(Portugal) António Félix da Costa	Porsche

The 2023 Hyderabad ePrix, known for sponsorships reasons as the 2023 Greenko Hyderabad ePrix, was a Formula E event held at the Hyderabad Street Circuit in the city of Hyderabad, Telangana, India on 11 February 2023 as the fourth round of the 2022–23 Formula E World Championship. This was the inaugural running of a Formula E event at the track, as well as the first time an ePrix was held in India. It was also the first motorsport event hosted by the country as part of an FIA-sanctioned World Championship since the 2013 Indian Grand Prix almost a decade prior.

== Background ==
=== History ===
Hyderabad was one of a number of Indian cities bidding to host a round of the FIA Formula E Championship, although it was only seriously considered after the COVID-19 pandemic had halted the discussions between the FIA and proposed hosts in Delhi and Mumbai. On 17 January 2022 the Government of Telangana signed a "letter of intent" with Formula E to stage the Hyderabad E-Prix, with a planned debut as a round of the 2022–23 season, towards the start of the season. The Hyderabad E-Prix was subsequently listed on the first provisional calendar for 2022–23 Formula E World Championship as the fourth round of the season, on 11 February 2023. The Hyderabad E-Prix was staged on the Hyderabad Street Circuit, which was set up on the banks of the artificial Hussain Sagar Lake, which was set to host its first event, a round of the Indian Racing League, in 2022.

=== Circuit ===
Hussain Sagar Map

The initial design of the track, which was designed with help from PPE Racing, a Filipino constructor and race track designer, was heavily criticised by drivers, with Norman Nato describing it as "looking like a dildo" after he drove on the track in a simulator. The track was later redesigned by Driven International, who also designed the 2021 layout of the Yas Marina Circuit in Abu Dhabi and the reception was positive.

=== Championship standings ===
Pascal Wehrlein entered the fourth round of the season as the points leader in the Drivers' Championship after winning both races at Diriyah, with Jake Dennis second by 6 points. In the first three previous races this season, only Wehrlein and Dennis finished in the first two positions. Avalanche Andretti led the Teams' Championship, 2 points ahead of TAG Heuer Porsche.

== Impact ==
The government of Telangana introduced three double-decker electric buses in preparation for the race. This marks the return of double decker buses to Hyderabad for the first time since 2003.

A study by Nielsen Sports Analysis found that the event contributed $83.7 million to Hyderabad's economy.

== Free practice ==
In Free Practice 1, held on 10 February at 4:30 PM, Pascal Wehrlein crashed hard into the barriers with an apparent vehicle malfunction causing Porsche to pit all of the cars on both Porsche teams – TAG Heuer Porsche and Avalanche Andretti.

== Classification ==
(All times are in IST)

=== Qualifying ===
Qualifying took place at 10:40 AM on 11 February.

Group draw
Group A	(Germany) WEH	(Switzerland) BUE	(United Kingdom) HUG	(Brazil) DIG	(New Zealand) EVA	(Portugal) DAC	(France) FEN	(Belgium) VAN	(Germany) GUE	(United Kingdom) ROW	(Brazil) SET
Group B	(United Kingdom) DEN	(United Kingdom) BIR	(Germany) RAS	(Germany) LOT	(New Zealand) CAS	(France) JEV	(Switzerland) MOR	(United Kingdom) TIC	(France) NAT	(Switzerland) MUE	(South Africa) VDL

==== Qualifying duels ====
Quarter-finals
A3	(Switzerland) Sébastien Buemi
A2	(France) Sacha Fenestraz
A4	(Germany) Maximilian Günther
A1	(New Zealand) Mitch Evans
B3	(United Kingdom) Sam Bird
B2	(France) Jean-Éric Vergne
B4	(Switzerland) Edoardo Mortara*
B1	(Germany) René Rast*

Semi-finals
(Switzerland) Sébastien Buemi
(New Zealand) Mitch Evans
(France) Jean-Éric Vergne
*

Final
(New Zealand) Mitch Evans
(France) Jean-Éric Vergne

* Sam Bird, Edoardo Mortara and René Rast all had their quarter-finals times deleted for exceeding track limits. Mortara and Rast had been seeded into the same duel, so neither driver advanced to the semi-finals. For this reason, Jean-Éric Vergne was not matched against any driver in the semi-finals and automatically advanced to the finals.

==== Overall classification ====
Pos.	No.	Driver	Team	A	B	QF	SF	F	Grid
1	9	(New Zealand) Mitch Evans	Jaguar	1:14.194	—N/a	1:13:526	1:13.250	1:13.228	1
2	25	(France) Jean-Éric Vergne	DS	—N/a	1:14:095	1:13.503	1:13.472	1:13.249	2
3	16	(Switzerland) Sébastien Buemi	Envision-Jaguar	1:14:503	—N/a	1:13:599	1:13:533	—N/a	3
4	23	(France) Sacha Fenestraz	Nissan	1:14:204	—N/a	No time (Note: Fenestraz's time was deleted for exceeding track limits.)	—N/a	—N/a	4
5	7	(Germany) Maximilian Günther	Maserati	1:14:518	—N/a	No time (Note: Günther's time was deleted for exceeding track limits.)	—N/a	—N/a	5
6	10	(United Kingdom) Sam Bird	Jaguar	—N/a	1:14:187	No time (Note: Bird's time was deleted for exceeding track limits.)	—N/a	—N/a	6
7	48	(Switzerland) Edoardo Mortara	Maserati	—N/a	1:14:233	No time (Note: Mortara's time was deleted for exceeding track limits.)	—N/a	—N/a	7
8	58	(Germany) René Rast	McLaren-Nissan	—N/a	1:14:091	No time (Note: Rast's time was deleted for exceeding track limits.)	—N/a	—N/a	8
9	94	(Germany) Pascal Wehrlein	Porsche	1:14.663	—N/a	—N/a	—N/a	—N/a	12 (Note: Wehrlein received a 3-place grid penalty for impeding Sette Câmara.)
10	37	(New Zealand) Nick Cassidy	Envision-Jaguar	—N/a	1:14:234	—N/a	—N/a	—N/a	9
11	8	(United Kingdom) Oliver Rowland	Mahindra	1:14:721	—N/a	—N/a	—N/a	—N/a	10
12	27	(United Kingdom) Jake Dennis	Andretti-Porsche	—N/a	1:14.377	—N/a	—N/a	—N/a	11
13	13	(Portugal) António Félix da Costa	Porsche	1:14:732	—N/a	—N/a	—N/a	—N/a	13
14	17	(France) Norman Nato	Nissan	—N/a	1:14.420	—N/a	—N/a	—N/a	14
15	3	(Brazil) Sérgio Sette Câmara	NIO	1:14:756	—N/a	—N/a	—N/a	—N/a	15
16	33	(United Kingdom) Dan Ticktum	NIO	—N/a	1:14.539	—N/a	—N/a	—N/a	16
17	1	(Belgium) Stoffel Vandoorne	DS	1:14.823	—N/a	—N/a	—N/a	—N/a	17
18	51	(Switzerland) Nico Müller	ABT-Mahindra	—N/a	1:14:549	—N/a	—N/a	—N/a	18
19	11	(Brazil) Lucas di Grassi	Mahindra	1:14:917	—N/a	—N/a	—N/a	—N/a	19
20	36	(Germany) André Lotterer	Andretti-Porsche	—N/a	1:14:818	—N/a	—N/a	—N/a	20
21	5	(United Kingdom) Jake Hughes	McLaren-Nissan	1:15:118	—N/a	—N/a	—N/a	—N/a	21
22	4	(South Africa) Kelvin van der Linde	ABT-Mahindra	—N/a	1:15:173	—N/a	—N/a	—N/a	22

=== Race ===
The race took place on February 11 at 3:03 PM.

Pos.	No.	Driver	Team	Laps	Time/Retired	Grid	Points
1	25	(France) Jean-Éric Vergne	DS Penske	33	46:01:099	2	25
2	37	(New Zealand) Nick Cassidy	Envision-Jaguar	33	+0.400	9	18
3	13	(Portugal) António Félix da Costa	Porsche	33	+1.859	13	15
4	94	(Germany) Pascal Wehrlein	Porsche	33	+2.855	12	12
5	3	(Brazil) Sérgio Sette Câmara	NIO	33	+3.523	15	10
6	8	(United Kingdom) Oliver Rowland	Mahindra	33	+7.138 (Note: Rowland received a 5-second time penalty for exceeding track limits.)	10	8
7	17	(France) Norman Nato	Nissan	33	+7.318	14	6+1
8	1	(Belgium) Stoffel Vandoorne	DS Penske	33	+7.564 (Note: Dennis received a 5-second time penalty for exceeding track limits.)	17	4
9	36	(Germany) André Lotterer	Andretti-Porsche	33	+8.703	20	2
10	48	(Switzerland) Edoardo Mortara	Maserati	33	+9.073	7	1
11	51	(Switzerland) Nico Müller	ABT-Mahindra	33	+10.622	18	
12	23	(France) Sacha Fenestraz	Nissan	33	+11.635	4	
13	7	(Germany) Maximilian Günther	Maserati	33	+15.446 (Note: Günther received a 5-second time penalty for exceeding track limits.)	5	
14	11	(Brazil) Lucas di Grassi	Mahindra	33	+15.999 (Note: di Grassi received a 5-second time penalty for exceeding track limits.)	19	
15	16	(Switzerland) Sébastien Buemi	Envision-Jaguar	33	+17.735 (Note: Buemi received a drive-through penalty, later converted into a 17-second penalty, for overpower.)	3	
16	27	(United Kingdom) Jake Dennis	Andretti-Porsche	33	+1:10.562 (Note: Dennis received a 5-second time penalty for exceeding track limits.)	11	
Ret	58	(Germany) René Rast	McLaren-Nissan	25	Collision damage	8	
Ret	5	(United Kingdom) Jake Hughes	McLaren-Nissan	22	Accident	21	
Ret	10	(United Kingdom) Sam Bird	Jaguar	18	Collision damage	6	
Ret	33	(United Kingdom) Dan Ticktum	NIO	15	Suspension	16	
Ret	9	(New Zealand) Mitch Evans	Jaguar	12	Collision damage	1	
Ret	4	(South Africa) Kelvin van der Linde	ABT-Mahindra	9	Suspension	22	

Notes:

- ^1 – Pole position.
- ^2 – Fastest lap.

==== Standings after the race ====
Drivers' Championship standings

	Pos	Driver	Points
	1	(Germany) Pascal Wehrlein	80
	2	(United Kingdom) Jake Dennis	62
8	3	(France) Jean-Éric Vergne	31
1	4	(Switzerland) Sébastien Buemi	31
5	5	(New Zealand) Nick Cassidy	28

Teams' Championship standings

	Pos	Constructor	Points
1	1	(Germany) Porsche	101
1	2	(United States) Andretti-Porsche	78
1	3	(United Kingdom) Envision-Jaguar	59
1	4	(United Kingdom) McLaren-Nissan	53
	5	(United Kingdom) Jaguar	42

- Notes: Only the top five positions are included for both sets of standings.

== Notes ==
Previous race: 2023 Diriyah ePrix	FIA Formula E World Championship; 2022–23 season	Next race: 2023 Cape Town ePrix
Previous race: N/A	Hyderabad ePrix	Next race: N/A
