= 2023 Mexico City ePrix =

Race 1 of 16 of the 2022–23 Formula E season
Next race →
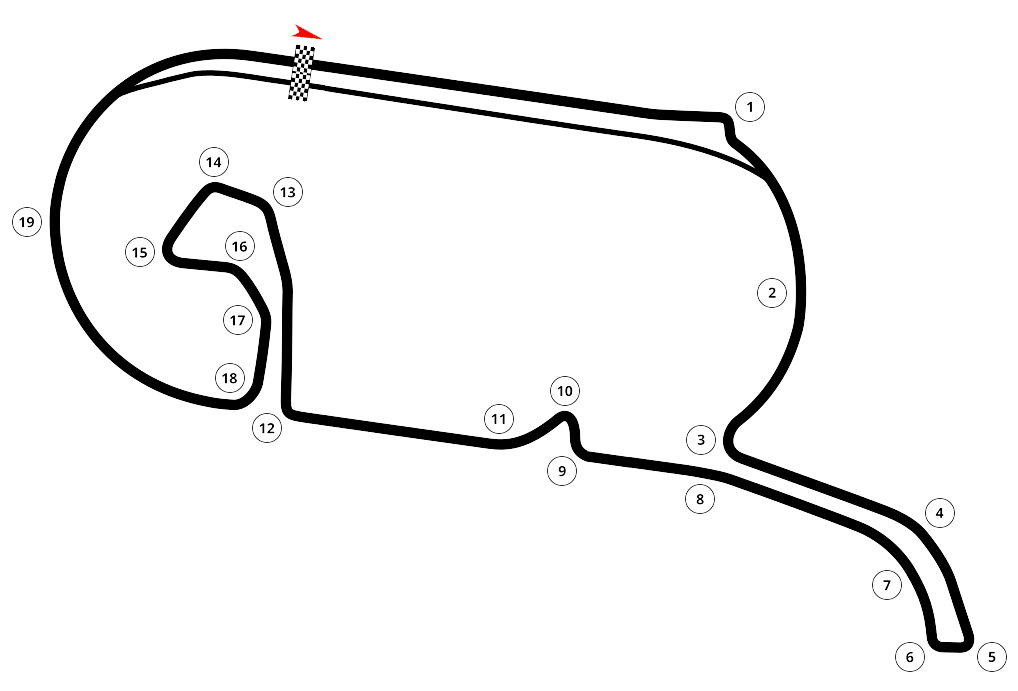

Race details
- Date: 14 January 2023
- Official name: 2023 Hankook Mexico City E-Prix
- Location: Autódromo Hermanos Rodríguez, Mexico City
- Course: Permanent racing facility
- Course length: 2.628 km (1.633 mi)
- Distance: 41 (Note: 36 planned laps and 5 extra laps) laps, 107.748 km (66.952 mi)
- Scheduled distance: 36 laps, 94.608 km (58.787 mi)
- Weather: Sunny

Pole position
Driver	(Brazil) Lucas di Grassi	Mahindra Racing
- Time: 1:13.575

Fastest lap
Driver	(United Kingdom) Jake Dennis	Avalanche Andretti
- Time: 1:14.195 on lap 14

Podium
First	(United Kingdom) Jake Dennis	Avalanche Andretti
Second	(Germany) Pascal Wehrlein	Porsche Formula E Team
Third	(Brazil) Lucas di Grassi	Mahindra Racing

The 2023 Mexico City ePrix known for sponsorships reasons as the 2023 Hankook Mexico City E-Prix was a Formula E electric car race held at the Autódromo Hermanos Rodríguez in the centre of Mexico City on 14 January 2023. It served as the opening round of the 2022–23 Formula E season and the seventh edition of the event.

== Background ==
This was the first race of the 2022–23 Formula E season and as such was also the first Formula E race run with the Gen3 cars. This race was also the first to not feature Fanboost, which previously allowed for fans to vote for drivers to get an extra power boost. As well, this was the first race in which Hankook was the tyre provider for Formula E, after Michelin previously had served as the tyre provider.

== Classification ==
(All times in CST)

=== Qualifying ===
Qualifying took place at 9:40 AM on 14 January.

Group draw
Group A	(Netherlands) FRI	(Germany) LOT	(France) JEV	(Switzerland) BUE	(United Kingdom) BIR	(Brazil) DIG	(Germany) GUE	(Germany) RAS	(Brazil) SET	(France) FEN	(Portugal) DAC
Group B	(Switzerland) MUE	(United Kingdom) DEN	(Belgium) VAN	(New Zealand) CAS	(New Zealand) EVA	(United Kingdom) ROW	(Switzerland) MOR	(United Kingdom) HUG	(United Kingdom) TIC	(France) NAT	(Germany) WEH

==== Qualifying duels ====
Quarter-finals
A3	(Brazil) Lucas di Grassi
A2	(Switzerland) Sébastien Buemi
A4	(France) Sacha Fenestraz
A1	(Germany) André Lotterer
B3	(United Kingdom) Jake Hughes
B2	(United Kingdom) Dan Ticktum
B4	(Germany) Pascal Wehrlein
B1	(United Kingdom) Jake Dennis

Semi-finals
(Germany) André Lotterer
(Brazil) Lucas di Grassi
(United Kingdom) Jake Dennis
(United Kingdom) Jake Hughes

Final
(Brazil) Lucas di Grassi
(United Kingdom) Jake Dennis

==== Overall classification ====
Pos.	No.	Driver	Team	A	B	QF	SF	F	Grid
1	11	(Brazil) Lucas di Grassi	Mahindra	1:13:461	—N/a	1:13:081	1:13:012	1:13:575	1
2	27	(United Kingdom) Jake Dennis	Andretti-Porsche	—N/a	1:13:074	1:13:002	1:12:595	1:16.516	2
3	5	(United Kingdom) Jake Hughes	McLaren-Nissan	—N/a	1:13:302	1:12:788	1:12.721	—N/a	3
4	36	(Germany) André Lotterer	Andretti-Porsche	1:13:405	—N/a	1:13:176	1:14.551	—N/a	4
5	33	(United Kingdom) Dan Ticktum	NIO	—N/a	1:13:287	1:12.922	—N/a	—N/a	5
6	94	(Germany) Pascal Wehrlein	Porsche	—N/a	1:13:359	1:13:031	—N/a	—N/a	6
7	16	(Switzerland) Sébastien Buemi	Envision-Jaguar	1:13:431	—N/a	1:13.100	—N/a	—N/a	7
8	23	(France) Sacha Fenestraz	Nissan	1:13:502	—N/a	1:13.220	—N/a	—N/a	8
9	13	(Portugal) António Félix da Costa	Porsche	1:13:504	—N/a	—N/a	—N/a	—N/a	9
10	9	(New Zealand) Mitch Evans	Jaguar	—N/a	1:13:405	—N/a	—N/a	—N/a	10
11	25	(France) Jean-Éric Vergne	DS	1:13:563	—N/a	—N/a	—N/a	—N/a	11
12	37	(New Zealand) Nick Cassidy	Envision-Jaguar	—N/a	1:13:415	—N/a	—N/a	—N/a	12
13	3	(Brazil) Sérgio Sette Câmara	NIO	1:13:613	—N/a	—N/a	—N/a	—N/a	13
14	1	(Belgium) Stoffel Vandoorne	DS	—N/a	1:13:450	—N/a	—N/a	—N/a	14
15	58	(Germany) René Rast	McLaren-Nissan	1:13:635	—N/a	—N/a	—N/a	—N/a	15
16	48	(Switzerland) Edoardo Mortara	Maserati	—N/a	1:13:618	—N/a	—N/a	—N/a	16
17	7	(Germany) Maximilian Günther	Maserati	1:13:742	—N/a	—N/a	—N/a	—N/a	17
18	51	(Switzerland) Nico Müller	ABT-Mahindra	—N/a	1:13:776	—N/a	—N/a	—N/a	18
19	4	(Netherlands) Robin Frijns	ABT-Mahindra	1:14:125	—N/a	—N/a	—N/a	—N/a	19
20	17	(France) Norman Nato	Nissan	—N/a	1:13:785	—N/a	—N/a	—N/a	20
21	10	(United Kingdom) Sam Bird	Jaguar	1:14:145	—N/a	—N/a	—N/a	—N/a	21
22	8	(United Kingdom) Oliver Rowland	Mahindra	—N/a	1:14:043	—N/a	—N/a	—N/a	22

=== Race ===
The race started at 2:03 PM on 14 January.

Pos.	No.	Driver	Team	Laps	Time/Retired	Grid	Points
1	27	(United Kingdom) Jake Dennis	Andretti-Porsche	41	58:25:974	2	25+1^{2}
2	94	(Germany) Pascal Wehrlein	Porsche	41	+7.816	6	18
3	11	(Brazil) Lucas di Grassi	Mahindra	41	+18.611	1	15+3^{1}
4	36	(Germany) André Lotterer	Andretti-Porsche	41	+19.161	4	12
5	5	(United Kingdom) Jake Hughes	McLaren-Nissan	41	+20.289	3	10
6	16	(Switzerland) Sébastien Buemi	Envision-Jaguar	41	+20.714	7	8
7	13	(Portugal) António Félix da Costa	Porsche	41	+21.051	9	6
8	9	(New Zealand) Mitch Evans	Jaguar	41	+24.758	10	4
9	37	(New Zealand) Nick Cassidy	Envision-Jaguar	41	+29.150	12	2
10	1	(Belgium) Stoffel Vandoorne	DS	41	+29.662	14	1
11	7	(Germany) Maximilian Günther	Maserati	41	+30.276	17	
12	25	(France) Jean-Éric Vergne	DS	41	+31.141	11	
13	8	(United Kingdom) Oliver Rowland	Mahindra	41	+31.537	22	
14	51	(Switzerland) Nico Müller	ABT-Mahindra	41	+31.951	18	
15	23	(France) Sacha Fenestraz	Nissan	41	+32.355	8	
16	3	(Brazil) Sérgio Sette Câmara	NIO	41	+35.205	13	
17	33	(United Kingdom) Dan Ticktum	NIO	41	+1:14.372 (Note: Ticktum received a 10-second penalty for gaining an advantage off the track.)	5	
Ret	58	(Germany) René Rast	McLaren-Nissan	37	Collision damage	15	
Ret	48	(Switzerland) Edoardo Mortara	Maserati	17	Accident	16	
Ret	10	(United Kingdom) Sam Bird	Jaguar	5	Driveshaft	21	
Ret	17	(France) Norman Nato	Nissan	2	Suspension	20	
Ret	4	(Netherlands) Robin Frijns	ABT-Mahindra	0	Collision	19	

Notes:

- ^1 – Pole position.
- ^2 – Fastest lap.

==== Standings after the race ====
Drivers' Championship standings

Pos	Driver	Points
1	(United Kingdom) Jake Dennis	26
2	(Germany) Pascal Wehrlein	18
3	(Brazil) Lucas di Grassi	18
4	(Germany) André Lotterer	12
5	(United Kingdom) Jake Hughes	10

Teams' Championship standings

Pos	Constructor	Points
1	(United States) Andretti-Porsche	38
2	(Germany) Porsche	24
3	(India) Mahindra	18
4	(United Kingdom) McLaren-Nissan	10
5	(United Kingdom) Envision-Jaguar	10

- Notes: Only the top five positions are included for both sets of standings.

== Notes ==
Previous race: 2022 Seoul ePrix	FIA Formula E World Championship; 2022–23 season	Next race: 2023 Diriyah ePrix
Previous race: 2022 Mexico City ePrix	Mexico City ePrix	Next race: 2024 Mexico City ePrix
