= 2023 Cape Town ePrix =

Race 5 of 16 of the 2022–23 Formula E season
← Previous race	Next race →
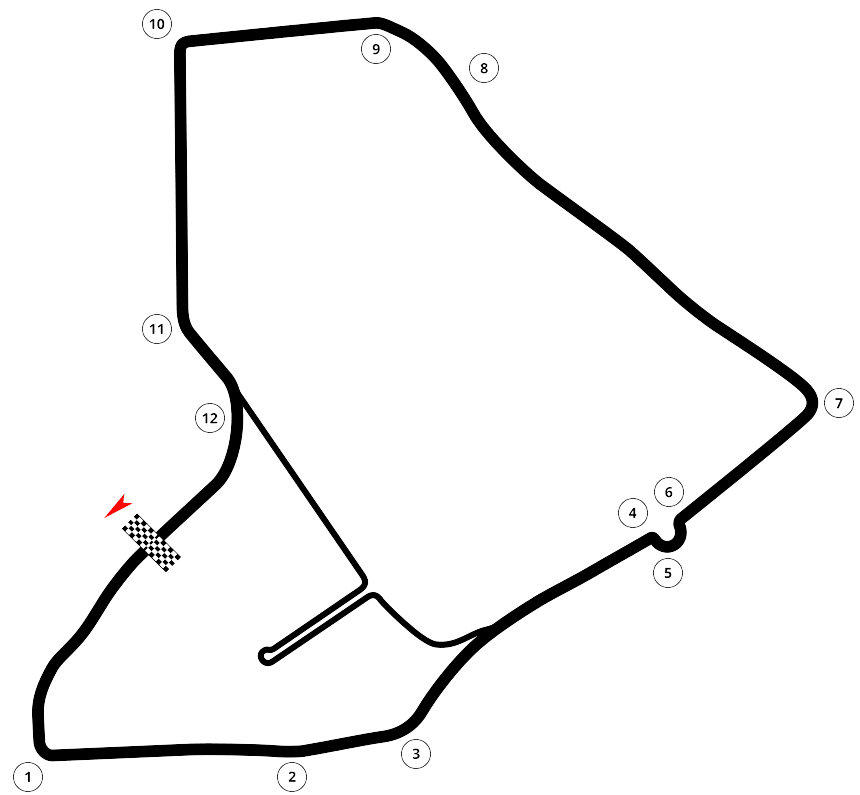

Race details
- Date: 25 February 2023
- Location: Cape Town Street Circuit, Cape Town, Western Cape, South Africa
- Course: Street Circuit
- Course length: 2.921 km (1.815 mi)
- Distance: 32 (Note: 30 planned laps and 2 extra laps) laps, 93.472 km (58.081 mi)
- Scheduled distance: 30 laps, 87.630 km (54.451 mi)

Pole position
Driver	(France) Sacha Fenestraz	Nissan
- Time: 1:07.848

Fastest lap
Driver	(France) Jean-Éric Vergne	DS
- Time: 1:09.740 on lap 17

Podium
First	(Portugal) António Félix da Costa	Porsche
Second	(France) Jean-Éric Vergne	DS
Third	(New Zealand) Nick Cassidy	Envision-Jaguar

The 2023 Cape Town ePrix was a Formula E electric car race was held at the Cape Town Street Circuit in the city of Cape Town in Western Cape, South Africa on 25 February 2023. It served as the fifth round of the 2022–23 Formula E season. As of the 2024–25 season, it remains the only Formula E race held in Sub-Saharan Africa.

== Background ==
=== History ===
Initially planned to be held in 2022, the race was canceled for unknown reasons likely related to the COVID-19 pandemic. Though not initially featured on the 2023 calendar, it was introduced after the cancellation of the Seoul ePrix.

=== Track ===
A 2.94 kilometres (1.83 mi) long street circuit was laid out in Cape Town's Waterfront district, around the Cape Town Stadium, near Signal Hill. The track was believed to be "one of the fastest on the calendar". In total, the track had 12 turns. The racing lap record has an average speed of 150.78 kilometres per hour (93.69 mph).

=== Championship standings ===
Pascal Wehrlein entered the fifth round of the season as the points leader in the Drivers' Championship by 18 points after Jake Dennis, who was only 6 points behind going into Hyderabad did not finish after having his rear wing clipped by René Rast. TAG Heuer Porsche leads the Teams' Championship by 23 points over Avalanche Andretti.

== Summary ==
After Lucas di Grassi suffered a rear suspension failure in practice, all four Mahindra M9Electro chassis were withdrawn from the event with concerns about defective wishbones. Sam Bird crashed in qualifying and did not start the race.

== Classification ==
(All times in SAST)

=== Qualifying ===
Qualifying took place at 11:40AM on 25 February.

Group draw
Group A	(Germany) WEH	(France) JEV	(New Zealand) CAS	(United Kingdom) HUG	(Portugal) DAC	(Germany) LOT	(Brazil) SET	(France) NAT	(France) FEN	(United Kingdom) TIC	(Switzerland) ~~MUE~~
Group B	(United Kingdom) DEN	(Switzerland) BUE	(United Kingdom) BIR	(Germany) RAS	(Brazil) ~~DIG~~	(New Zealand) EVA	(United Kingdom) ~~ROW~~	(Belgium) VAN	(Switzerland) MOR	(Germany) GUE	(South Africa) ~~VDL~~

==== Qualifying duels ====
Quarter-finals
A3	(New Zealand) Nick Cassidy
A2	(Germany) Pascal Wehrlein
A4	(France) Sacha Fenestraz
A1	(France) Jean-Éric Vergne
B3	(New Zealand) Mitch Evans
B2	(Switzerland) Sébastien Buemi
B4	(Germany) Maximilian Günther
B1	(Germany) René Rast

Semi-finals
(France) Sacha Fenestraz
(New Zealand) Nick Cassidy
(Germany) Maximilian Günther
(New Zealand) Mitch Evans

Final
(France) Sacha Fenestraz
(Germany) Maximilian Günther

==== Overall classification ====
Pos.	No.	Driver	Team	A	B	QF	SF	F	Grid
1	23	(France) Sacha Fenestraz	Nissan	1:08:994	—N/a	1:08:467	1:08:357	1:07:848	1
2	7	(Germany) Maximilian Günther	Maserati	—N/a	1:09:050	1:08:740	1:08:212	1:08.270	2
3	37	(New Zealand) Nick Cassidy	Envision-Jaguar	1:09:007	—N/a	1:08:446	1:08:465	—N/a	3
4	9	(New Zealand) Mitch Evans	Jaguar	—N/a	1:09:025	1:08:429	1:08.568	—N/a	4
5	25	(France) Jean-Éric Vergne	DS	1:09:139	—N/a	1:08.520	—N/a	—N/a	5
6	94	(Germany) Pascal Wehrlein	Porsche	1:09:100	—N/a	1:08:598	—N/a	—N/a	6
7	58	(Germany) René Rast	McLaren-Nissan	—N/a	1:08:844	1:08:962	—N/a	—N/a	10 (Note: Rast received a 3-place grid penalty for causing a collision with Jake Dennis in the Hyderabad ePrix.)
8	16	(Switzerland) Sébastien Buemi	Envision-Jaguar	—N/a	1:09:040	1:11.937	—N/a	—N/a	7
9	33	(United Kingdom) Dan Ticktum	NIO	1:09:171	—N/a	—N/a	—N/a	—N/a	8
10	10	(United Kingdom) Sam Bird	Jaguar	—N/a	1:09:217	—N/a	—N/a	—N/a	— (Note: Sam Bird qualified 10th, but withdrew before the race.)
11	17	(France) Norman Nato	Nissan	1:09:263	—N/a	—N/a	—N/a	—N/a	9
12	27	(United Kingdom) Jake Dennis	Andretti-Porsche	—N/a	1:09:265	—N/a	—N/a	—N/a	14 (Note: Dennis received a 3-place grid penalty for impeding Vandoorne.)
13	13	(Portugal) António Félix da Costa	Porsche	1:09:441	—N/a	—N/a	—N/a	—N/a	11
14	1	(Belgium) Stoffel Vandoorne	DS	—N/a	1:09:500	—N/a	—N/a	—N/a	12
15	5	(United Kingdom) Jake Hughes	McLaren-Nissan	1:09:493	—N/a	—N/a	—N/a	—N/a	13
16	48	(Switzerland) Edoardo Mortara	Maserati	—N/a	1:15:775	—N/a	—N/a	—N/a	PL (Note: Mortara failed to set a lap within the 107% time, but was permitted to race at the stewards' discretion.)
17	36	(Germany) André Lotterer	Andretti-Porsche	1:09:975	—N/a	—N/a	—N/a	—N/a	15
18	3	(Brazil) Sérgio Sette Câmara	NIO	1:10:083	—N/a	—N/a	—N/a	—N/a	16

=== Race ===
The race began at 16:03 on 25 February.

Pos.	No.	Driver	Team	Laps	Time/Retired	Grid	Points
1	13	(Portugal) António Félix da Costa	Porsche	32	42:25:403	11	25
2	25	(France) Jean-Éric Vergne	DS	32	+0.281	5	18+1^{2}
3	37	(New Zealand) Nick Cassidy	Envision-Jaguar	32	+1.808	3	15
4	58	(Germany) René Rast	McLaren-Nissan	32	+2.208	10	12
5	16	(Switzerland) Sébastien Buemi	Envision-Jaguar	32	+2.656	7	10
6	33	(United Kingdom) Dan Ticktum	NIO	32	+3.209	8	8
7	1	(Belgium) Stoffel Vandoorne	DS	32	+4.210	12	6
8	17	(France) Norman Nato	Nissan	32	+8.582	9	4
9	36	(Germany) André Lotterer	Andretti-Porsche	32	+8.755 (Note: Lotterer received a 5-second time penalty for failing to keep within 10 lengths of the safety car.)	15	2
10	5	(United Kingdom) Jake Hughes	McLaren-Nissan	32	+10.475	13	1
11	9	(New Zealand) Mitch Evans	Jaguar	32	+14.183	4	
12	3	(Brazil) Sérgio Sette Câmara	NIO	32	+14.914	16	
13	27	(United Kingdom) Jake Dennis	Andretti-Porsche	32	+38.846	14	
NC	23	(France) Sacha Fenestraz	Nissan	31	Accident	1	0+3^{1}
Ret	7	(Germany) Maximilian Günther	Maserati	20	Accident	2	
Ret	48	(Switzerland) Edoardo Mortara	Maserati	1	Accident	PL^{3}	
Ret	94	(Germany) Pascal Wehrlein	Porsche	0	Accident	6	
DNS	10	(United Kingdom) Sam Bird	Jaguar	0	Did Not Start		

Notes:

- ^1 – Pole position.
- ^2 – Fastest lap.
- ^3 – Started from the pit lane.

==== Standings after the race ====
Drivers' Championship standings

	Pos	Driver	Points
	1	(Germany) Pascal Wehrlein	80
	2	(United Kingdom) Jake Dennis	62
	3	(France) Jean-Éric Vergne	50
5	4	(Portugal) António Félix da Costa	46
	5	(New Zealand) Nick Cassidy	43

Teams' Championship standings

	Pos	Constructor	Points
	1	(Germany) Porsche	126
1	2	(United Kingdom) Envision-Jaguar	84
1	3	(United States) Andretti-Porsche	80
	4	(United Kingdom) McLaren-Nissan	66
1	5	(France) DS	61

- Notes: Only the top five positions are included for both sets of standings.

== Impact ==
It was estimated by a city councillor that around R 2,000,000,000 would be brought to Cape Town from the event and those travelling to the city for the event. As well as being held in conjunction with the African Green Economy Summit, the event was on the same weekend as the 2023 Kyalami 9 Hours.

== Notes ==
Previous race: 2023 Hyderabad ePrix	FIA Formula E World Championship; 2022–23 season	Next race: 2023 São Paulo ePrix
Previous race: N/A	Cape Town ePrix	Next race: Unknown
