= 2023 Diriyah ePrix =

Race 2 of 16 of the 2022–23 Formula E season
← Previous race	Next race →
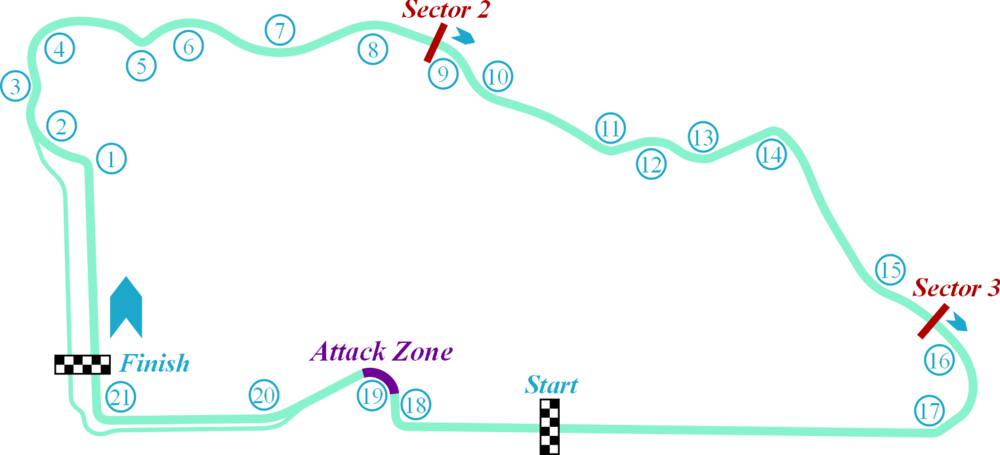

Race details
- Date: 27 January 2023
- Official name: 2023 CORE Diriyah E-Prix
- Location: Riyadh Street Circuit, Diriyah, Riyadh, Saudi Arabia
- Course: Street circuit
- Course length: 2.495 km (1.550 mi)
- Distance: 39 laps, 97.305 km (60.463 mi)

Pole position
Driver	(Switzerland) Sébastien Buemi	Envision-Jaguar
- Time: 1:09.435

Fastest lap
Driver	(Germany) René Rast	McLaren-Nissan
- Time: 1:10.117 on lap 17

Podium
First	(Germany) Pascal Wehrlein	Porsche
Second	(United Kingdom) Jake Dennis	Andretti-Porsche
Third	(United Kingdom) Sam Bird	Jaguar

2023 Diriyah ePrix
Race 3 of 16 of the 2022–23 Formula E season
← Previous race	Next race →
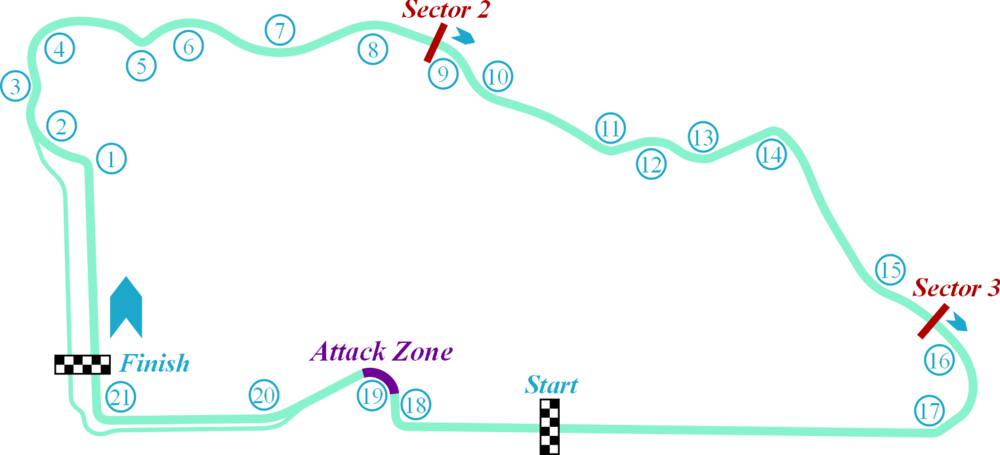

Race details
- Date: 28 January 2023
- Official name: 2023 CORE Diriyah E-Prix
- Location: Riyadh Street Circuit, Diriyah, Riyadh, Saudi Arabia
- Course: Street circuit
- Course length: 2.495 km (1.550 mi)
- Distance: 40 (Note: 39 planned laps and 1 extra lap) laps, 99.800 km (62.013 mi)
- Scheduled distance: 39 laps, 97.305 km (60.463 mi)

Pole position
Driver	(United Kingdom) Jake Hughes	McLaren-Nissan
- Time: 1:08.693

Fastest lap
Driver	(United Kingdom) Sam Bird	Jaguar
- Time: 1:09.010 on lap 34

Podium
First	(Germany) Pascal Wehrlein	Porsche
Second	(United Kingdom) Jake Dennis	Andretti-Porsche
Third	(Germany) René Rast	McLaren-Nissan

The 2023 Diriyah ePrix known for sponsorship reasons as the 2023 CORE Diriyah ePrix was a pair of Formula E electric car races held at the Riyadh Street Circuit in the town of Diriyah, north-west of Riyadh, in Saudi Arabia on 27 and 28 January 2023. It was the second round of the 2022–23 Formula E season, the fifth edition of the Diriyah ePrix and the third time the Diriyah ePrix was held at night.

== Background ==
After the first round in Mexico City, Jake Dennis was leading the Drivers' Championship ahead of Pascal Wehrlein and Lucas di Grassi and Avalanche Andretti led the Teams' Championship ahead of Porsche Formula E and Mahindra Racing

=== Driver changes ===
After breaking his wrist in a crash at the 2023 Mexico City ePrix, Robin Frijns was unable to race in the Diriyah ePrix and was replaced by Kelvin van der Linde.

== Classification ==
(All times are in AST)

=== Race one ===
==== Qualifying ====
Qualifying took place at 3:40 PM on January 27

Group draw
Group A	(United Kingdom) HUG	(United Kingdom) ROW	(United Kingdom) TIC	(Brazil) DIG	(New Zealand) CAS	(United Kingdom) DEN	(Portugal) DAC	(France) NAT	(France) FEN	(Switzerland) MOR	(Germany) GUE
Group B	(United Kingdom) BIR	(Switzerland) BUE	(New Zealand) EVA	(Germany) RAS	(Germany) WEH	(Brazil) SET	(France) JEV	(Germany) LOT	(Belgium) VAN	(South Africa) VDL	(Switzerland) MUE

==== Qualifying duels ====
Quarter-finals
A3	(United Kingdom) Dan Ticktum
A2	(United Kingdom) Oliver Rowland
A4	(Brazil) Lucas di Grassi
A1	(United Kingdom) Jake Hughes
B3	(United Kingdom) Mitch Evans
B2	(Switzerland) Sébastien Buemi
B4	(Germany) René Rast
B1	(United Kingdom) Sam Bird

Semi-finals
(United Kingdom) Dan Ticktum
(United Kingdom) Jake Hughes
(Switzerland) Sébastien Buemi
(United Kingdom) Sam Bird

Final
(United Kingdom) Jake Hughes
(Switzerland) Sébastien Buemi

==== Overall classification ====
Pos.	No.	Driver	Team	A	B	QF	SF	F	Grid
1	16	(Switzerland) Sébastien Buemi	Envision-Jaguar	—N/a	1:10:231	1:09:790	1:09:366	1:09:435	1
2	5	(United Kingdom) Jake Hughes	McLaren-Nissan	1:10:269	—N/a	1:09:713	1:09.779	1:09:495	2
3	10	(United Kingdom) Sam Bird	Jaguar	—N/a	1:09:942	1:09:558	1:09:462	—N/a	3
4	33	(United Kingdom) Dan Ticktum	NIO	1:10:661	—N/a	1:09.593	1:10:246	—N/a	4
5	58	(Germany) René Rast	McLaren-Nissan	—N/a	1:10:265	1:09:729	—N/a	—N/a	5
6	9	(New Zealand) Mitch Evans	Jaguar	—N/a	1:10:245	1:10:039	—N/a	—N/a	6
7	11	(Brazil) Lucas di Grassi	Mahindra	1:10:784	—N/a	1:10:052	—N/a	—N/a	7
8	8	(United Kingdom) Oliver Rowland	Mahindra	1:10:600	—N/a	1:10:114	—N/a	—N/a	8
9	94	(Germany) Pascal Wehrlein	Porsche	—N/a	1:10:407	—N/a	—N/a	—N/a	9
10	37	(New Zealand) Nick Cassidy	Envision-Jaguar	1:10:829	—N/a	—N/a	—N/a	—N/a	10
11	3	(Brazil) Sérgio Sette Câmara	NIO	—N/a	1:10:598	—N/a	—N/a	—N/a	14 (Note: Sette Câmara received a 3-place grid penalty for impeding Wehrlein.)
12	27	(United Kingdom) Jake Dennis	Andretti-Porsche	1:10:903	—N/a	—N/a	—N/a	—N/a	11
13	25	(France) Jean-Éric Vergne	DS	—N/a	1:10:602	—N/a	—N/a	—N/a	12
14	13	(Portugal) António Félix da Costa	Porsche	1:10:940	—N/a	—N/a	—N/a	—N/a	13
15	36	(Germany) André Lotterer	Andretti-Porsche	—N/a	1:10:607	—N/a	—N/a	—N/a	15
16	17	(France) Norman Nato	Nissan	1:10:985	—N/a	—N/a	—N/a	—N/a	16
17	1	(Belgium) Stoffel Vandoorne	DS	—N/a	1:10:636	—N/a	—N/a	—N/a	17
18	23	(France) Sacha Fenestraz	Nissan	1:11:073	—N/a	—N/a	—N/a	—N/a	18
19	4	(South Africa) Kelvin van der Linde	ABT-Mahindra	—N/a	1:11:048	—N/a	—N/a	—N/a	19
20	48	(Switzerland) Edoardo Mortara	Maserati	1:11:708	—N/a	—N/a	—N/a	—N/a	20
21	51	(Switzerland) Nico Müller	ABT-Mahindra	—N/a	No time	—N/a	—N/a	—N/a	21 (Note: Although Müller failed to set a time in qualifying, he was permitted to race at the stewards' discretion.)
22	7	(Germany) Maximilian Günther	Maserati	1:32:982	—N/a	—N/a	—N/a	—N/a	22

==== Race ====
The race took place on January 27 at 8:03 PM.

Pos.	No.	Driver	Team	Laps	Time/Retired	Grid	Points
1	94	(Germany) Pascal Wehrlein	Porsche	39	47:45:567	9	25
2	27	(United Kingdom) Jake Dennis	Andretti-Porsche	39	+0.531	11	18
3	10	(United Kingdom) Sam Bird	Jaguar	39	+3.526	3	15
4	16	(Switzerland) Sébastien Buemi	Envision-Jaguar	39	+6.048	1	12+3^{1}
5	58	(Germany) René Rast	McLaren-Nissan	39	+7.471	5	10+1^{2}
6	37	(New Zealand) Nick Cassidy	Envision-Jaguar	39	+7.614	10	8
7	25	(France) Jean-Éric Vergne	DS	39	+12.394	12	6
8	5	(United Kingdom) Jake Hughes	McLaren-Nissan	39	+15.187	2	4
9	36	(Germany) André Lotterer	Andretti-Porsche	39	+15.563	15	2
10	9	(New Zealand) Mitch Evans	Jaguar	39	+17.914 (Note: Evans received a 5-second penalty for forcing Rast off the track.)	6	1
11	1	(Belgium) Stoffel Vandoorne	DS	39	+26.307	17	
12	17	(France) Norman Nato	Nissan	39	+27.070	16	
13	11	(Brazil) Lucas di Grassi	Mahindra	39	+28.779	7	
14	33	(United Kingdom) Dan Ticktum	NIO	39	+37.318	4	
15	3	(Brazil) Sérgio Sette Câmara	NIO	39	+45.034	14	
16	4	(South Africa) Kelvin van der Linde	ABT-Mahindra	39	+1:09.547	19	
17	23	(France) Sacha Fenestraz	Nissan	39	+1:09.547	18	
18	8	(United Kingdom) Oliver Rowland	Mahindra	38	+1 lap	8	
19	13	(Portugal) António Félix da Costa	Porsche	38	+1 lap	13	
Ret	48	(Switzerland) Edoardo Mortara	Maserati	32	Puncture	20	
Ret	51	(Switzerland) Nico Müller	ABT-Mahindra	13	Chassis damage	21	
DNS	7	(Germany) Maximilian Günther	Maserati	0	Did not start	22	

Notes:

- ^1 – Pole position.
- ^2 – Fastest lap.

==== Standings after the race ====
Drivers' Championship standings

	Pos	Driver	Points
	1	(United Kingdom) Jake Dennis	44
	2	(Germany) Pascal Wehrlein	43
3	3	(Switzerland) Sébastien Buemi	23
1	4	(Brazil) Lucas di Grassi	18
17	5	(United Kingdom) Sam Bird	15

Teams' Championship standings

	Pos	Constructor	Points
	1	(United States) Andretti-Porsche	58
	2	(Germany) Porsche	49
2	3	(United Kingdom) Envision-Jaguar	33
	4	(United Kingdom) McLaren-Nissan	25
1	5	(United Kingdom) Jaguar	20

- Notes: Only the top five positions are included for both sets of standings.

=== Race two ===
==== Qualifying ====
Qualifying took place at 3:40 PM on January 28

Group draw
Group A	(United Kingdom) DEN	(Switzerland) BUE	(United Kingdom) HUG	(Germany) LOT	(New Zealand) CAS	(Portugal) DAC	(Belgium) VAN	(France) NAT	(United Kingdom) TIC	(Brazil) SET	(South Africa) VDL
Group B	(Germany) WEH	(Brazil) DIG	(United Kingdom) BIR	(Germany) RAS	(France) JEV	(New Zealand) EVA	(Germany) GUE	(United Kingdom) ROW	(Switzerland) MUE	(France) FEN	(Switzerland) MOR

==== Qualifying duels ====
Quarter-finals
A2	(Switzerland) Sébastien Buemi
A3	(Belgium) Stoffel Vandoorne
A1	(United Kingdom) Jake Hughes
A4	(United Kingdom) Jake Dennis
B2	(Germany) René Rast
B3	(Germany) Pascal Wehrlein
B1	(New Zealand) Mitch Evans
B4	(Switzerland) Edoardo Mortara

Semi-finals
(Switzerland) Sébastien Buemi
(United Kingdom) Jake Hughes
(Germany) René Rast
(New Zealand) Mitch Evans

Final
(United Kingdom) Jake Hughes
(New Zealand) Mitch Evans

==== Overall classification ====
Pos.	No.	Driver	Team	A	B	QF	SF	F	Grid
1	5	(United Kingdom) Jake Hughes	McLaren-Nissan	1:09:361	—N/a	1:08:748	1:08.680	1:08:693	1
2	9	(New Zealand) Mitch Evans	Jaguar	—N/a	1:09:401	1:08:909	1:08:690	1:08:797	2
3	58	(Germany) René Rast	McLaren-Nissan	—N/a	1:09:435	1:08:855	1:08:922	—N/a	3
4	16	(Switzerland) Sébastien Buemi	Envision-Jaguar	1:09:422	—N/a	1:08:925	1:08:926	—N/a	4
5	94	(Germany) Pascal Wehrlein	Porsche	—N/a	1:09:576	1:09:028	—N/a	—N/a	5
6	27	(United Kingdom) Jake Dennis	Andretti-Porsche	1:09:572	—N/a	1:09:198	—N/a	—N/a	6
7	48	(Switzerland) Edoardo Mortara	Maserati	—N/a	1:09:623	1:09:279	—N/a	—N/a	7
8	1	(Belgium) Stoffel Vandoorne	DS	1:09:518	—N/a	1:09:282	—N/a	—N/a	8
9	10	(United Kingdom) Sam Bird	Jaguar	1:09:628	—N/a	—N/a	—N/a	—N/a	9
10	7	(Germany) Maximilian Günther	Maserati	—N/a	1:09:643	—N/a	—N/a	—N/a	10
11	33	(United Kingdom) Dan Ticktum	NIO	1:09:698	—N/a	—N/a	—N/a	—N/a	11
12	23	(France) Sacha Fenestraz	Nissan	—N/a	1:09:670	—N/a	—N/a	—N/a	12
13	3	(Brazil) Sérgio Sette Câmara	NIO	1:09:735	—N/a	—N/a	—N/a	—N/a	13
14	8	(United Kingdom) Oliver Rowland	Mahindra	—N/a	1:09:690	—N/a	—N/a	—N/a	14
15	37	(New Zealand) Nick Cassidy	Envision-Jaguar	1:09:761	—N/a	—N/a	—N/a	—N/a	15
16	25	(France) Jean-Éric Vergne	DS	—N/a	1:09:794	—N/a	—N/a	—N/a	16
17	13	(Portugal) António Félix da Costa	Porsche	1:09:832	—N/a	—N/a	—N/a	—N/a	17
18	36	(Germany) André Lotterer	Andretti-Porsche	—N/a	1:09:843	—N/a	—N/a	—N/a	18
19	17	(France) Norman Nato	Nissan	1:10:107	—N/a	—N/a	—N/a	—N/a	19
20	11	(Brazil) Lucas di Grassi	Mahindra	—N/a	1:09:975	—N/a	—N/a	—N/a	20
21	4	(South Africa) Kelvin van der Linde	ABT-Mahindra	1:10.221	—N/a	—N/a	—N/a	—N/a	21
22	51	(Switzerland) Nico Müller	ABT-Mahindra	—N/a	1:10:072	—N/a	—N/a	—N/a	22

==== Race ====
The race took place on January 28 at 8:03 PM.

Pos.	No.	Driver	Team	Laps	Time/Retired	Grid	Points
1	94	(Germany) Pascal Wehrlein	Porsche	40	50:40:304	5	25
2	27	(United Kingdom) Jake Dennis	Andretti-Porsche	40	+1.252	6	18
3	58	(Germany) René Rast	McLaren-Nissan	40	+4.554	3	15
4	10	(United Kingdom) Sam Bird	Jaguar	40	+5.851	9	12+1
5	5	(United Kingdom) Jake Hughes	McLaren-Nissan	40	+10.869	1	10+3
6	16	(Switzerland) Sébastien Buemi	Envision-Jaguar	40	+10.947	4	8
7	9	(New Zealand) Mitch Evans	Jaguar	40	+11.088	2	6
8	23	(France) Sacha Fenestraz	Nissan	40	+12.409	12	4
9	48	(Switzerland) Edoardo Mortara	Maserati	40	+12.753	7	2
10	33	(United Kingdom) Dan Ticktum	NIO	40	+13.275	11	1
11	13	(Portugal) António Félix da Costa	Porsche	40	+15.229	17	
12	36	(Germany) André Lotterer	Andretti-Porsche	40	+15.623	18	
13	37	(New Zealand) Nick Cassidy	Envision-Jaguar	40	+17.038	15	
14	17	(France) Norman Nato	Nissan	40	+19.569	19	
15	11	(Brazil) Lucas di Grassi	Mahindra	40	+20.796	20	
16	25	(France) Jean-Éric Vergne	DS	40	+21.221	16	
17	3	(Brazil) Sérgio Sette Câmara	NIO	40	+22.243	13	
18	4	(South Africa) Kelvin van der Linde	ABT-Mahindra	40	+25.291	21	
19	7	(Germany) Maximilian Günther	Maserati	40	+27.137	10	
20	1	(Belgium) Stoffel Vandoorne	DS	40	+37.572 (Note: Vandoorne received a drive-through penalty, later converted into a 24-second penalty, for failing to activate attack mode for the second time.)	8	
Ret	8	(United Kingdom) Oliver Rowland	Mahindra	30	Puncture	14	
Ret	51	(Switzerland) Nico Müller	ABT-Mahindra	25	Accident	22	

==== Standings after the race ====
Drivers' Championship standings

	Pos	Driver	Points
1	1	(Germany) Pascal Wehrlein	68
1	2	(United Kingdom) Jake Dennis	62
	3	(Switzerland) Sébastien Buemi	31
1	4	(United Kingdom) Sam Bird	28
2	5	(United Kingdom) Jake Hughes	27

Teams' Championship standings

	Pos	Constructor	Points
	1	(United States) Andretti-Porsche	76
	2	(Germany) Porsche	74
1	3	(United Kingdom) McLaren-Nissan	53
1	4	(United Kingdom) Envision-Jaguar	41
	5	(United Kingdom) Jaguar	39

- Notes: Only the top five positions are included for both sets of standings.

== Notes ==
Previous race: 2023 Mexico City ePrix	FIA Formula E World Championship; 2022–23 season	Next race: 2023 Hyderabad ePrix
Previous race: 2022 Diriyah ePrix	Diriyah ePrix	Next race: 2024 Diriyah ePrix
