= 2021 Diriyah ePrix =

Race 1 of 15 of the 2020–21 Formula E season
Next race →
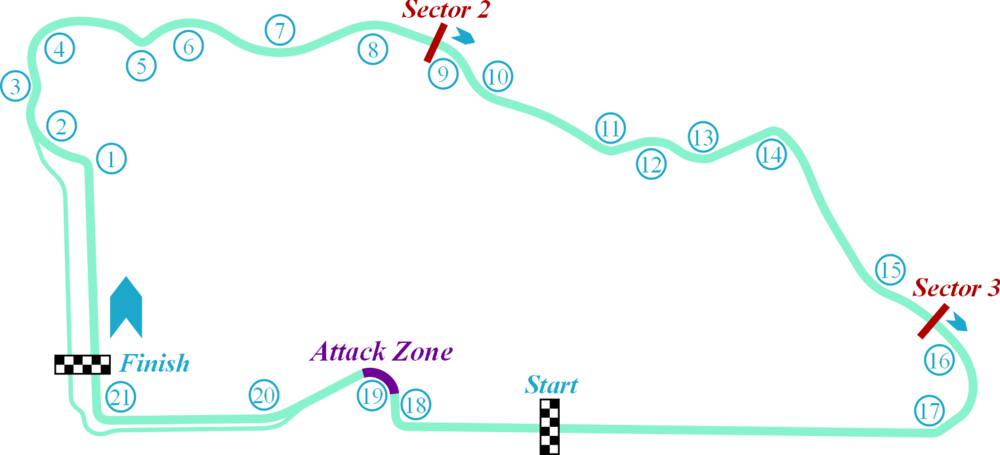

Race details
- Date: 26 February 2021
- Official name: 2021 Diriyah E-Prix
- Location: Riyadh Street Circuit, Diriyah, Riyadh, Saudi Arabia
- Course: Street circuit
- Course length: 2.495 km (1.550 mi)
- Distance: 32 laps, 79.840 km (49.610 mi)

Pole position
Driver	(Netherlands) Nyck de Vries	Mercedes
- Time: 1:08.157

Fastest lap
Driver	(Belgium) Stoffel Vandoorne (Germany) René Rast (Note: Rast received the point for fastest lap as Vandoorne used FanBoost during his fastest lap.)	Mercedes; Audi
- Time: 1:09.583 (1:09.655) on lap 30 (16)

Podium
First	(Netherlands) Nyck de Vries	Mercedes
Second	(Switzerland) Edoardo Mortara	Venturi-Mercedes
Third	(New Zealand) Mitch Evans	Jaguar

2021 Diriyah ePrix
Race 2 of 15 of the 2020–21 Formula E season
Next race →
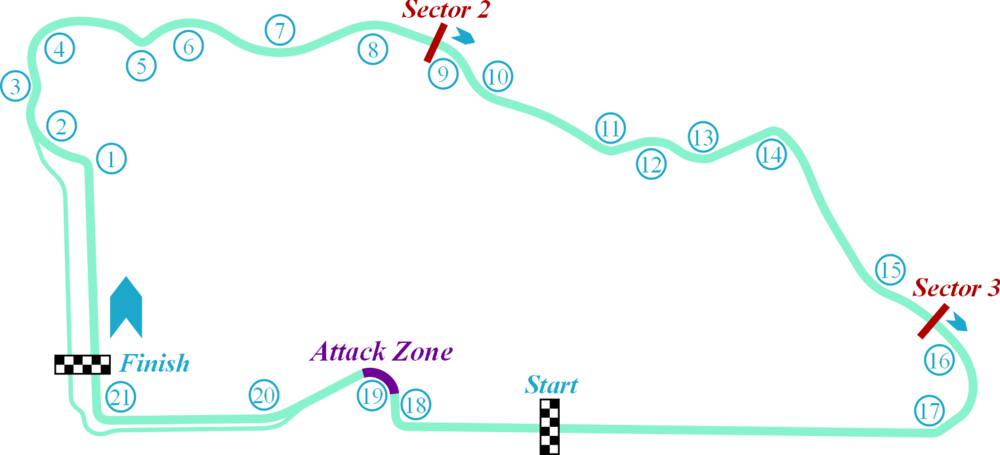

Race details
- Date: 27 February 2021
- Official name: 2021 Diriyah E-Prix
- Location: Riyadh Street Circuit, Diriyah, Riyadh, Saudi Arabia
- Course: Street circuit
- Course length: 2.495 km (1.550 mi)
- Distance: 29 laps, 72.355 km (44.959 mi)

Pole position
Driver	(Netherlands) Robin Frijns	Virgin-Audi
- Time: 1:07.889

Fastest lap
Driver	(Netherlands) Nyck de Vries	Mercedes
- Time: 1:08.811 on lap 20

Podium
First	(United Kingdom) Sam Bird	Jaguar
Second	(Netherlands) Robin Frijns	Virgin-Audi
Third	(Portugal) António Félix da Costa	Techeetah-DS

The 2021 Diriyah ePrix (officially the 2021 ABB FIA Formula E Diriyah ePrix) was a pair of Formula E electric car races held at the Riyadh Street Circuit in the town of Diriyah, north-west of Riyadh, in Saudi Arabia on 26 and 27 February 2021. It was the opening round of the 2020–21 Formula E season and the third edition of the Diriyah ePrix, and marked the first ever Formula E race held at night. The first race was won by Nyck de Vries, with Edoardo Mortara and Mitch Evans rounding out the podium. Sam Bird won the second race, ahead of Robin Frijns and António Félix da Costa.

== Classification ==
=== Race one ===
==== Qualifying ====
Group draw
Group 1	(Portugal) DAC (1)	(Belgium) VAN (2)	(France) JEV (3)	(Switzerland) BUE (4)	(United Kingdom) ROW (5)	(Brazil) DIG (6)
Group 2	(New Zealand) EVA (7)	(Germany) LOT (8)	(Germany) GUE (9)	(United Kingdom) BIR (10)	(Netherlands) DEV (11)	(Netherlands) FRI (12)
Group 3	(United Kingdom) SIM (13)	(Switzerland) MOR (14)	(Germany) RAS (15)	(United Kingdom) LYN (17)	(Germany) WEH (18)	(United Kingdom) TUR (24)
Group 4	(Switzerland) MUL (25)	(United Kingdom) BLO (26)	(Brazil) SET (27)	(United Kingdom) DEN (–)	(New Zealand) CAS (–)	(France) NAT (–)

Pos.	No.	Driver	Team	GS	SP	Grid
1	17	(Netherlands) Nyck de Vries	Mercedes	1:08.786	1:08.157	1
2	99	(Germany) Pascal Wehrlein	Porsche	1:08.885	1:08.821	2
3	33	(Germany) René Rast	Audi	1:08.959	1:08.869	3
4	48	(Switzerland) Edoardo Mortara	Venturi-Mercedes	1:08.798	1:09.317	4
5	94	(United Kingdom) Alex Lynn	Mahindra	1:09.133	1:09.345	5
6	20	(New Zealand) Mitch Evans	Jaguar	1:09.152	1:09.706	6
7	36	(Germany) André Lotterer	Porsche	1:09.157	—N/a	7
8	10	(United Kingdom) Sam Bird	Jaguar	1:09.265	—N/a	8
9	28	(Germany) Maximilian Günther	Andretti-BMW	1:09.277	—N/a	9
10	22	(United Kingdom) Oliver Rowland	e.dams-Nissan	1:09.362	—N/a	10
11	29	(United Kingdom) Alexander Sims	Mahindra	1:09.559	—N/a	11
12	71	(France) Norman Nato	Venturi-Mercedes	1:09.628	—N/a	12
13	8	(United Kingdom) Oliver Turvey	NIO	1:09.631	—N/a	13
14	27	(United Kingdom) Jake Dennis	Andretti-BMW	1:09.723	—N/a	14
15	5	(Belgium) Stoffel Vandoorne	Mercedes	1:10.128	—N/a	15
16	11	(Brazil) Lucas di Grassi	Audi	1:10.474	—N/a	16
17	23	(Switzerland) Sébastien Buemi	e.dams-Nissan	1:10.594	—N/a	17
18	13	(Portugal) António Félix da Costa	Techeetah-DS	1:10.735	—N/a	18
19	25	(France) Jean-Éric Vergne	Techeetah-DS	1:10.804	—N/a	19
20	7	(Brazil) Sérgio Sette Câmara	Dragon-Penske	1:21.445	—N/a	20
21	37	(New Zealand) Nick Cassidy	Virgin-Audi	1:22.020^{1}	—N/a	21
22	88	(United Kingdom) Tom Blomqvist	NIO	1:23.165^{1}	—N/a	22
23	6	(Switzerland) Nico Müller	Dragon-Penske	1:24.955^{1}	—N/a	23
24	4	(Netherlands) Robin Frijns	Virgin-Audi	no time	—N/a	24

Notes:

- ^1 – Nick Cassidy, Tom Blomqvist, and Nico Müller had their fastest qualifying lap times deleted for failing to reduce speed under double yellow flag.

==== Race ====
Pos.	No.	Driver	Team	Laps	Time/Retired	Grid	Points
1	17	(Netherlands) Nyck de Vries	Mercedes	32	46:44.765	1	25+3+1^{1}
2	48	(Switzerland) Edoardo Mortara	Venturi-Mercedes	32	+4.119	4	18
3	20	(New Zealand) Mitch Evans	Jaguar	32	+4.619	6	15
4	33	(Germany) René Rast	Audi	32	+4.852	3	12+1^{2}
5	99	(Germany) Pascal Wehrlein	Porsche	32	+7.962	2	10
6	22	(United Kingdom) Oliver Rowland	e.dams-Nissan	32	+9.318	10	8
7	29	(United Kingdom) Alexander Sims	Mahindra	32	+9.686	11	6
8	5	(Belgium) Stoffel Vandoorne	Mercedes	32	+9.973	15	4
9	11	(Brazil) Lucas di Grassi	Audi	32	+11.089	16	2
10	8	(United Kingdom) Oliver Turvey	NIO	32	+15.518	13	1
11	13	(Portugal) António Félix da Costa	Techeetah-DS	32	+16.225	18	
12	27	(United Kingdom) Jake Dennis	Andretti-BMW	32	+17.025	14	
13	23	(Switzerland) Sébastien Buemi	e.dams-Nissan	32	+17.273	17	
14	71	(France) Norman Nato	Venturi-Mercedes	32	+17.312	12	
15	25	(France) Jean-Éric Vergne	Techeetah-DS	32	+18.402	19	
16	36	(Germany) André Lotterer	Porsche	32	+18.417	7	
17	4	(Netherlands) Robin Frijns	Virgin-Audi	32	+18.822	24	
18	88	(United Kingdom) Tom Blomqvist	NIO	32	+19.072	22	
19	37	(New Zealand) Nick Cassidy	Virgin-Audi	32	+19.951	21	
20	7	(Brazil) Sérgio Sette Câmara	Dragon-Penske	32	+20.174	20	
21	6	(Switzerland) Nico Müller	Dragon-Penske	32	+20.586	PL	
Ret	28	(Germany) Maximilian Günther	Andretti-BMW	23	Accident	9	
Ret	10	(United Kingdom) Sam Bird	Jaguar	22	Collision damage	8	
Ret	94	(United Kingdom) Alex Lynn	Mahindra	16	Collision	5	

Notes:

- ^1 – Pole position; fastest in group stage.
- ^2 – Fastest lap.

==== Standings after the race ====
Drivers' Championship standings

Pos	Driver	Points
1	(Netherlands) Nyck de Vries	29
2	(Switzerland) Edoardo Mortara	18
3	(New Zealand) Mitch Evans	15
4	(Germany) René Rast	13
5	(Germany) Pascal Wehrlein	10

Teams' Championship standings

Pos	Constructor	Points
1	(Germany) Mercedes-EQ Formula E Team	33
2	(Monaco) ROKiT Venturi Racing	18
3	(United Kingdom) Jaguar Racing	15
4	(Germany) Audi Sport ABT Schaeffler Formula E Team	15
5	(Germany) TAG Heuer Porsche Formula E Team	10

- Notes: Only the top five positions are included for both sets of standings.

=== Race two ===
==== Qualifying ====
Group draw
Group 1	(Netherlands) DEV (1)	(Switzerland) MOR (2)	(New Zealand) EVA (3)	(Germany) RAS (4)	(Germany) WEH (5)	(United Kingdom) ROW (6)
Group 2	(United Kingdom) SIM (7)	(Belgium) VAN (8)	(Brazil) DIG (9)	(United Kingdom) TUR (10)	(Portugal) DAC (11)	(United Kingdom) DEN (12)
Group 3	(Switzerland) BUE (13)	(France) NAT (14)	(France) JEV (15)	(Germany) LOT (16)	(Netherlands) FRI (17)	(United Kingdom) BLO (18)
Group 4	(New Zealand) CAS (19)	(Brazil) SET (20)	(Switzerland) MUL (21)	(Germany) GUE (22)	(United Kingdom) BIR (23)	(United Kingdom) LYN (24)

Pos.	No.	Driver	Team	GS	SP	Grid
1	4	(Netherlands) Robin Frijns	Virgin-Audi	1:07.810	1:07.889	1
2	7	(Brazil) Sérgio Sette Câmara	Dragon-Penske	1:08.333	1:08.178	2
3	10	(United Kingdom) Sam Bird	Jaguar	1:08.384	1:08.405	3
4	8	(United Kingdom) Oliver Turvey	NIO	1:08.424	1:08.439	4
5	88	(United Kingdom) Tom Blomqvist	NIO	1:08.367	1:08.732	5
6	6	(Switzerland) Nico Müller	Dragon-Penske	1:08.432	1:09.060	6
7	25	(France) Jean-Éric Vergne	Techeetah-DS	1:08.471	—N/a	7
8	23	(Switzerland) Sébastien Buemi	e.dams-Nissan	1:08.544	—N/a	8
9	94	(United Kingdom) Alex Lynn	Mahindra	1:08.632	—N/a	12^{3}
10	13	(Portugal) António Félix da Costa	Techeetah-DS	1:08.649	—N/a	9
11	37	(New Zealand) Nick Cassidy	Virgin-Audi	1:08.733	—N/a	10
12	28	(Germany) Maximilian Günther	Andretti-BMW	1:08.797	—N/a	11
13	22	(United Kingdom) Oliver Rowland	e.dams-Nissan	1:08.798	—N/a	13
14	29	(United Kingdom) Alexander Sims	Mahindra	1:08.876	—N/a	14
15	11	(Brazil) Lucas Di Grassi	Audi	1:08.970	—N/a	15
16	99	(Germany) Pascal Wehrlein	Porsche	1:09.601	—N/a	16
17	27	(United Kingdom) Jake Dennis	Andretti-BMW	1:11.194	—N/a	17
18	20	(New Zealand) Mitch Evans	Jaguar	1:13.868	—N/a	18
19	33	(Germany) René Rast	Audi	1:13.954	—N/a	19
20	17	(Netherlands) Nyck De Vries	Mercedes	no time^{4}	—N/a	20
21	48	(Switzerland) Edoardo Mortara	Venturi-Mercedes	no time^{4}	—N/a	21
22	5	(Belgium) Stoffel Vandoorne	Mercedes	no time^{4}	—N/a	22
23	71	(France) Norman Nato	Venturi-Mercedes	no time^{4}	—N/a	23
24	36	(Germany) André Lotterer	Porsche	no time	—N/a	24

Notes:

- ^3 – Alex Lynn received a 3-place grid penalty for causing a collision in race one.
- ^4 – Following a brake failure in Edoardo Mortara's car that caused him to crash heavily into the barriers in free practice, all four Mercedes-powered cars were deemed unsafe and therefore not allowed to participate in qualifying.

==== Race ====
Pos.	No.	Driver	Team	Laps	Time/Retired	Grid	Points
1	10	(United Kingdom) Sam Bird	Jaguar	29	39:50.836	3	25
2	4	(Netherlands) Robin Frijns	Virgin-Audi	29	+2.194	1	18+3+1^{5}
3	13	(Portugal) António Félix da Costa	Techeetah-DS	29	+6.900	9	15
4	7	(Brazil) Sérgio Sette Câmara	Dragon-Penske	29	+12.817	2	12
5	6	(Switzerland) Nico Müller	Dragon-Penske	29	+13.924	6	10
6	8	(United Kingdom) Oliver Turvey	NIO	29	+15.523	4	8
7	22	(United Kingdom) Oliver Rowland	e.dams-Nissan	29	+16.389	13	6
8	11	(Brazil) Lucas di Grassi	Audi	29	+20.612	15	4
9	17	(Netherlands) Nyck de Vries	Mercedes	29	+22.482	20	2+1^{6}
10	99	(Germany) Pascal Wehrlein	Porsche	29	+25.395	16	1
11	36	(Germany) André Lotterer	Porsche	29	+27.257	PL	
12	25	(France) Jean-Éric Vergne	Techeetah-DS	29	+28.846^{7}	7	
13	5	(Belgium) Stoffel Vandoorne	Mercedes	29	+29.112	22	
14	37	(New Zealand) Nick Cassidy	Virgin-Audi	29	+33.079^{7}	10	
15	29	(United Kingdom) Alexander Sims	Mahindra	29	+43.885^{7}	14	
16	71	(France) Norman Nato	Venturi-Mercedes	29	+48.192	23	
17	33	(Germany) René Rast	Audi	29	+1:06.254^{7}	19	
18	88	(United Kingdom) Tom Blomqvist	NIO	29	+1:09.508^{7}	5	
Ret	23	(Switzerland) Sébastien Buemi	e.dams-Nissan	26	Retired	8	
Ret	28	(Germany) Maximilian Günther	Andretti-BMW	26	Collision	11	
Ret	20	(New Zealand) Mitch Evans	Jaguar	26	Collision	18	
Ret	94	(United Kingdom) Alex Lynn	Mahindra	26	Collision^{7}	12	
Ret	27	(United Kingdom) Jake Dennis	Andretti-BMW	16	Collision	17	
DNS	48	(Switzerland) Edoardo Mortara	Venturi-Mercedes	0	Did not start	21	

Notes:

- ^5 – Pole position; fastest in group stage.
- ^6 – Fastest lap.
- ^7 – Jean-Éric Vergne, René Rast and Tom Blomqvist received a drive-through penalty apiece for failing to activate the second of the two mandatory attack modes. Rast and Blomqvist also received a further drive-through penalty for speeding under full course yellow, as did Nick Cassidy. Alexander Sims and Alex Lynn received a drive-through penalty each for a technical infringement involving the throttle pedal map. All these penalties were issued after the race and were therefore converted into 24-second time penalties.

==== Standings after the race ====
Drivers' Championship standings

	Pos	Driver	Points
	1	(Netherlands) Nyck de Vries	32
21	2	(United Kingdom) Sam Bird	25
14	3	(Netherlands) Robin Frijns	22
2	4	(Switzerland) Edoardo Mortara	18
6	5	(Portugal) António Félix da Costa	15

Teams' Championship standings

	Pos	Constructor	Points
3	1	(United Kingdom) Jaguar Racing	40
1	2	(Germany) Mercedes-EQ Formula E Team	36
8	3	(United Kingdom) Envision Virgin Racing	22
8	4	(United States) Dragon / Penske Autosport	22
2	5	(Germany) Audi Sport ABT Schaeffler Formula E Team	19

- Notes: Only the top five positions are included for both sets of standings.

== Events ==
=== Major incidents ===
Edoardo Mortara suffered a brake failure in his Venturi-Mercedes car while making practice starts after the end of Saturday's free practice 3, causing him to crash heavily into the barriers at turn one. He was taken to hospital for precautionary checks. Mortara was permitted to race, despite not taking part in qualifying. However, he did not take the start as his mechanics could not repair the damage to his car in time.

Later on in the day, race two ended early following an accident – not shown on the international broadcast, but on one of the track's CCTV cameras – involving Mitch Evans and Alex Lynn in which the latter's car flipped over. It came shortly after Sébastien Buemi had come to a halt and Maximilian Günther and Tom Blomqvist had made contact further up ahead on the same lap. Immediately after Lynn's car stopped, Evans jumped out of his car to check on the Briton. The safety car was called out, and eventually the race was concluded with a red flag. Lynn was taken to hospital for examination, and later the Mahindra team announced on Twitter that he had been cleared from the hospital, and would thus be allowed to take part in the Rome ePrix. The way the crash unfolded looked similar to that of Formula One driver Mark Webber at the 2010 European Grand Prix, with the exception that Lynn's car landed upside down rather than Webber's right side up.

=== Other ===
During the award ceremony, the government of Saudi Arabia, with a Patriot missile, neutralized a missile over Riyadh, near the town of Diriyah, allegedly fired by Yemen's Houthi rebels. There were no injuries, but flights were diverted or cancelled, making some participants go back to their hotels, and a house was damaged. This also raised concerns about the then-upcoming Saudi Arabian Grand Prix, with regards to safety for the staff, teams, and drivers; such a missile attack did occur during the 2022 running of the Formula One event.

== Notes ==
Previous race: 2020 Berlin ePrix	FIA Formula E World Championship; 2020–21 season	Next race: 2021 Rome ePrix
Previous race: 2019 Ad Diriyah ePrix	Diriyah ePrix	Next race: 2022 Diriyah ePrix
