= 2022 Diriyah ePrix =

Race 1 of 16 of the 2021–22 Formula E season
Next race →
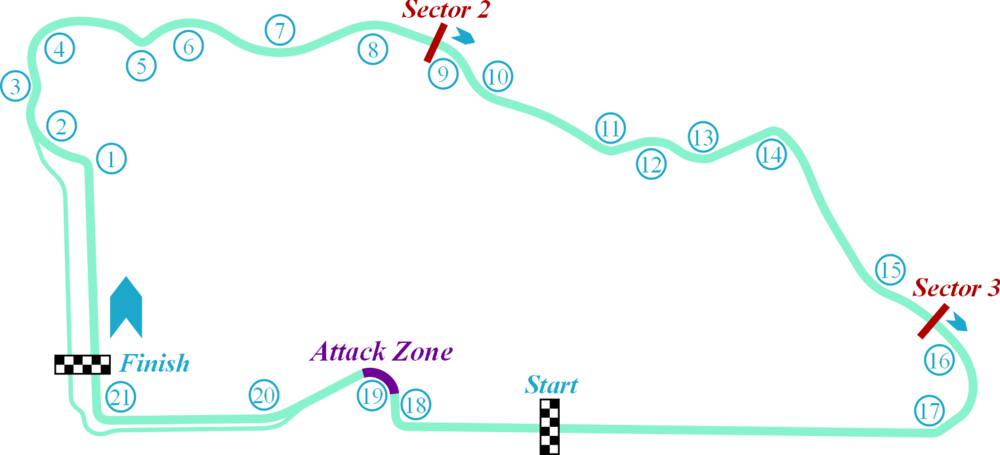

Race details
- Date: 28 January 2022
- Official name: 2022 Diriyah E-Prix
- Location: Riyadh Street Circuit, Diriyah, Riyadh, Saudi Arabia
- Course: Street circuit
- Course length: 2.495 km (1.550 mi)
- Distance: 41 laps, 102.295 km (63.563 mi)
- Weather: Dry

Pole position
Driver	(Belgium) Stoffel Vandoorne	Mercedes
- Time: 1:08.626

Fastest lap
Driver	(New Zealand) Nick Cassidy	Envision-Audi
- Time: 1:09.207 on lap 18

Podium
First	(Netherlands) Nyck de Vries	Mercedes
Second	(Belgium) Stoffel Vandoorne	Mercedes
Third	(United Kingdom) Jake Dennis	Andretti-BMW

2022 Diriyah ePrix
Race 2 of 16 of the 2021–22 Formula E season
Next race →
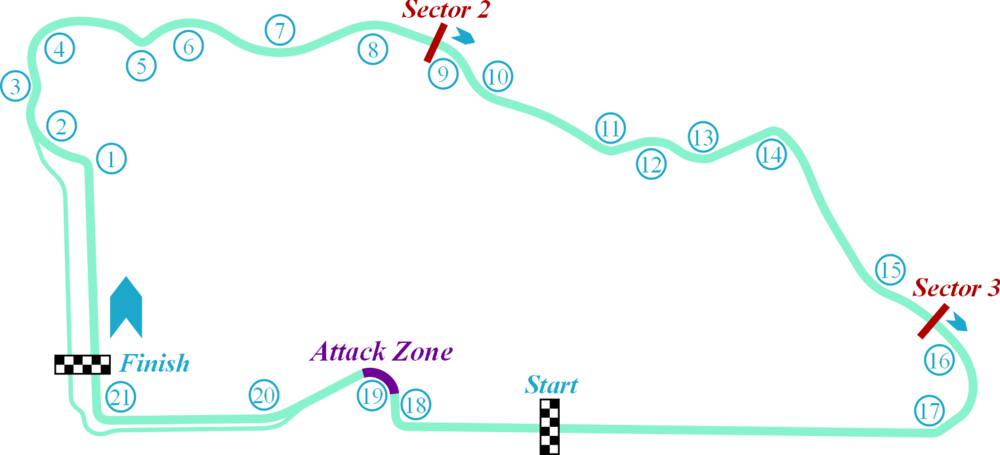

Race details
- Date: 29 January 2022
- Official name: 2022 Diriyah E-Prix
- Location: Riyadh Street Circuit, Diriyah, Riyadh, Saudi Arabia
- Course: Street circuit
- Course length: 2.495 km (1.550 mi)
- Distance: 35 laps, 87.325 km (54.261 mi)
- Weather: Dry

Pole position
Driver	(Netherlands) Nyck de Vries	Mercedes
- Time: 1:07.154

Fastest lap
Driver	(United Kingdom) Sam Bird (Belgium) Stoffel Vandoorne (Note: Vandoorne received the point for fastest lap as Bird failed to finish in the top 10.)	Jaguar; Mercedes
- Time: 1:08.723 (1:08.917) on lap 24 (24)

Podium
First	(Switzerland) Edoardo Mortara	Venturi-Mercedes
Second	(Netherlands) Robin Frijns	Envision-Audi
Third	(Brazil) Lucas di Grassi	Venturi-Mercedes

The 2022 Diriyah ePrix was a pair of Formula E electric car races held at the Riyadh Street Circuit in the town of Diriyah, north-west of Riyadh, in Saudi Arabia on 28 and 29 January 2022. It was the opening round of the 2021–22 Formula E season and the fourth edition of the Diriyah ePrix, and was held at night for the second time. Novelties for the event included the introduction of a knockout-style qualifying format, which replaced the series' long-standing four-group and superpole qualifying.

The first race was won by defending world champion Nyck de Vries, with Stoffel Vandoorne and Jake Dennis rounding out the podium. Edoardo Mortara won the second race, ahead of Robin Frijns and Lucas di Grassi.

== Background ==
Nyck de Vries entered the event as the series' reigning world champion, whilst his team Mercedes-EQ Formula E Team are the defending constructors' champions in what is set to be their last season in Formula E.

=== Regulation changes ===
The races were the first to see the new knockout-style qualifying format introduced for the season. Under the new format, the grid is split into two groups of eleven cars, each of which will have ten minutes to set the fastest time with the cars set to deliver 220kW of power. The fastest four drivers from each group then advance to a knockout-style tournament to decide the top eight, with the drivers being eliminated via quarter-final and semi-final heats to leave a two-car battle for pole position. The cars' usable power is upped to 250kW for the knockout stages.

=== Driver changes ===
Following the withdrawal of Audi from Formula E at the end of the 2020–21 season, former champion Lucas di Grassi moved to ROKiT Venturi, partnering the incumbent Edoardo Mortara and replacing Norman Nato, the series' latest race winner, who moved to Jaguar as a reserve driver. Long-time Nissan e.dams driver Oliver Rowland switched to Mahindra Racing to replace the outgoing Alex Lynn, his space at Nissan being taken by former Andretti driver and three-time race winner Maximilian Günther.

Three drivers made their Formula E debuts at the event. Former Formula One driver Antonio Giovinazzi joined Dragon / Penske Autosport to partner Brazilian Sérgio Sette Câmara. Former Red Bull junior Dan Ticktum joined NIO to replace the outgoing Tom Blomqvist alongside Oliver Turvey. 2019 Indy Lights champion and former IndyCar driver Oliver Askew joined Andretti Autosport, no longer factory-backed by BMW, to partner Jake Dennis, who came third in the 2020–21 season as a rookie.

== Classification ==
=== Race one ===
==== Qualifying ====
Group draw
Group A	(United States) ASK	(Brazil) SET	(France) JEV	(Netherlands) FRI	(United Kingdom) BIR	(United Kingdom) ROW	(Belgium) VAN	(United Kingdom) TUR	(Switzerland) BUE	(Brazil) DIG	(Germany) WEH
Group B	(United Kingdom) DEN	(Italy) GIO	(Portugal) DAC	(New Zealand) CAS	(New Zealand) EVA	(United Kingdom) SIM	(Netherlands) DEV	(United Kingdom) TIC	(Germany) GUE	(Switzerland) MOR	(Germany) LOT

===== Qualifying duels =====
Quarter-finals
B4	(Germany) André Lotterer
A1	(Netherlands) Robin Frijns
B3	(United Kingdom) Jake Dennis
A2	(United Kingdom) Sam Bird
A3	(Belgium) Stoffel Vandoorne
B2	(New Zealand) Nick Cassidy
A4	(United Kingdom) Oliver Rowland
B1	(Netherlands) Nyck de Vries

Semi-finals
(Germany) André Lotterer
(United Kingdom) Jake Dennis
(Belgium) Stoffel Vandoorne
(Netherlands) Nyck de Vries

Final
(United Kingdom) Jake Dennis
(Belgium) Stoffel Vandoorne

===== Overall classification =====
Pos.	No.	Driver	Team	A	B	QF	SF	F	Grid
1	5	(Belgium) Stoffel Vandoorne	Mercedes	1:09.489	—N/a	1:08.873	1:08.407	1:08.626	1
2	27	(United Kingdom) Jake Dennis	Andretti-BMW	—N/a	1:09.284	1:08.749	1:08.379	1:08.926	2
3	17	(Netherlands) Nyck de Vries	Mercedes	—N/a	1:09.164	1:08.600	1:08.813	—N/a	3
4	36	(Germany) André Lotterer	Porsche	—N/a	1:09.313	1:09.018	1:09.014	—N/a	4
5	10	(United Kingdom) Sam Bird	Jaguar	1:09.407	—N/a	1:08.919	—N/a	—N/a	5
6	37	(New Zealand) Nick Cassidy	Envision-Audi	—N/a	1:09.214	1:08.951	—N/a	—N/a	6
7	4	(Netherlands) Robin Frijns	Envision-Audi	1:09.163	—N/a	1:09.109	—N/a	—N/a	7
8	30	(United Kingdom) Oliver Rowland	Mahindra	1:09.549	—N/a	1:09.329	—N/a	—N/a	11^{1}
9	11	(Brazil) Lucas di Grassi	Venturi-Mercedes	1:09.617	—N/a	—N/a	—N/a	—N/a	8
10	22	(Germany) Maximilian Günther	e.dams-Nissan	—N/a	1:09.471	—N/a	—N/a	—N/a	9
11	94	(Germany) Pascal Wehrlein	Porsche	1:09.710	—N/a	—N/a	—N/a	—N/a	10
12	48	(Switzerland) Edoardo Mortara	Venturi-Mercedes	—N/a	1:09.536	—N/a	—N/a	—N/a	12
13	25	(France) Jean-Éric Vergne	Techeetah-DS	1:09.811	—N/a	—N/a	—N/a	—N/a	13
14	9	(New Zealand) Mitch Evans	Jaguar	—N/a	1:09.587	—N/a	—N/a	—N/a	14
15	7	(Brazil) Sérgio Sette Câmara	Dragon-Penske	1:09.867	—N/a	—N/a	—N/a	—N/a	15
16	13	(Portugal) António Félix da Costa	Techeetah-DS	—N/a	1:09.704	—N/a	—N/a	—N/a	16
17	28	(United States) Oliver Askew	Andretti-BMW	1:09.891	—N/a	—N/a	—N/a	—N/a	17
18	29	(United Kingdom) Alexander Sims	Mahindra	—N/a	1:10.039	—N/a	—N/a	—N/a	18
19	3	(United Kingdom) Oliver Turvey	NIO	1:10.129	—N/a	—N/a	—N/a	—N/a	19
20	33	(United Kingdom) Dan Ticktum	NIO	—N/a	1:10.507	—N/a	—N/a	—N/a	20
21	23	(Switzerland) Sébastien Buemi	e.dams-Nissan	1:10.185	—N/a	—N/a	—N/a	—N/a	21
22	99	(Italy) Antonio Giovinazzi	Dragon-Penske	—N/a	1:10.596	—N/a	—N/a	—N/a	22

Notes:

- ^1 – Oliver Rowland received a 3-place grid penalty for impeding another driver in the pit lane.

==== Race ====
Pos.	No.	Driver	Team	Laps	Time/Retired	Grid	Points
1	17	(Netherlands) Nyck de Vries	Mercedes	41	52:14.642	3	25
2	5	(Belgium) Stoffel Vandoorne	Mercedes	41	+0.636	1	18+3^{1}
3	27	(United Kingdom) Jake Dennis	Andretti-BMW	41	+8.802	2	15
4	10	(United Kingdom) Sam Bird	Jaguar	41	+14.925	5	12
5	11	(Brazil) Lucas di Grassi	Venturi-Mercedes	41	+15.152	8	10
6	48	(Switzerland) Edoardo Mortara	Venturi-Mercedes	41	+16.015	12	8
7	37	(New Zealand) Nick Cassidy	Envision-Audi	41	+17.265	6	6+1^{2}
8	25	(France) Jean-Éric Vergne	Techeetah-DS	41	+25.076	13	4
9	28	(United States) Oliver Askew	Andretti-BMW	41	+25.699	17	2
10	9	(New Zealand) Mitch Evans	Jaguar	41	+27.320	14	1
11	94	(Germany) Pascal Wehrlein	Porsche	41	+28.781	10	
12	22	(Germany) Maximilian Günther	e.dams-Nissan	41	+30.536	9	
13	36	(Germany) André Lotterer	Porsche	41	+31.521	4	
14	29	(United Kingdom) Alexander Sims	Mahindra	41	+34.572	18	
15	7	(Brazil) Sérgio Sette Câmara	Dragon-Penske	41	+36.781	15	
16	4	(Netherlands) Robin Frijns	Envision-Audi	41	+39.953	7	
17	23	(Switzerland) Sébastien Buemi	e.dams-Nissan	41	+41.334	21	
18	33	(United Kingdom) Dan Ticktum	NIO	41	+49.222	20	
19	3	(United Kingdom) Oliver Turvey	NIO	41	+50.965	19	
20	99	(Italy) Antonio Giovinazzi	Dragon-Penske	41	+1:16.527	22	
Ret	30	(United Kingdom) Oliver Rowland	Mahindra	7	Collision	11	
Ret	13	(Portugal) António Félix da Costa	Techeetah-DS	0	Collision damage	16	

Notes:

- ^1 – Pole position.
- ^2 – Fastest lap.

==== Standings after the race ====
Drivers' Championship standings

Pos	Driver	Points
1	(Netherlands) Nyck de Vries	25
2	(Belgium) Stoffel Vandoorne	21
3	(United Kingdom) Jake Dennis	15
4	(United Kingdom) Sam Bird	12
5	(Brazil) Lucas di Grassi	10

Teams' Championship standings

Pos	Constructor	Points
1	(Germany) Mercedes	46
2	(Monaco) Venturi-Mercedes	18
3	(United States) Andretti-BMW	17
4	(United Kingdom) Jaguar	13
5	(United Kingdom) Envision-Audi	7

- Notes: Only the top five positions are included for both sets of standings.

=== Race two ===
==== Qualifying ====
Group draw
Group A	(Netherlands) DEV (1)	(United Kingdom) DEN (3)	(Brazil) DIG (5)	(New Zealand) CAS (7)	(United States) ASK (9)	(Germany) WEH (11)	(Germany) LOT (13)	(Brazil) SET (15)	(Switzerland) BUE (17)	(United Kingdom) TUR (19)	(United Kingdom) ROW (21)
Group B	(Belgium) VAN (2)	(United Kingdom) BIR (4)	(Switzerland) MOR (6)	(France) JEV (8)	(New Zealand) EVA (10)	(Germany) GUE (12)	(United Kingdom) SIM (14)	(Netherlands) FRI (16)	(United Kingdom) TIC (18)	(Italy) GIO (20)	(Portugal) DAC (22)

===== Qualifying duels =====
Quarter-finals
B4	(France) Jean-Éric Vergne
A1	(Netherlands) Nyck de Vries
B3	(Portugal) António Félix da Costa
A2	(Brazil) Lucas di Grassi
A3	(United Kingdom) Oliver Rowland
B2	(Netherlands) Robin Frijns
A4	(Germany) André Lotterer
B1	(Switzerland) Edoardo Mortara

Semi-finals
(Netherlands) Nyck de Vries
(Brazil) Lucas di Grassi
(Netherlands) Robin Frijns
(Switzerland) Edoardo Mortara

Final
(Netherlands) Nyck de Vries
(Switzerland) Edoardo Mortara

===== Overall classification =====
Pos.	No.	Driver	Team	A	B	QF	SF	F	Grid
1	17	(Netherlands) Nyck de Vries	Mercedes	1:07.939	—N/a	1:06.871	1:06.835	1:07.154	1
2	48	(Switzerland) Edoardo Mortara	Venturi-Mercedes	—N/a	1:07.724	1:07.014	1:06.987	1:07.159	2
3	4	(Netherlands) Robin Frijns	Envision-Audi	—N/a	1:07.757	1:07.207	1:07.184	—N/a	3
4	11	(Brazil) Lucas di Grassi	Venturi-Mercedes	1:08.083	—N/a	1:07.580	1:07.216	—N/a	4
5	36	(Germany) André Lotterer	Porsche	1:08.224	—N/a	1:07.285	—N/a	—N/a	5
6	25	(France) Jean-Éric Vergne	Techeetah-DS	—N/a	1:07.968	1:07.539	—N/a	—N/a	6
7	30	(United Kingdom) Oliver Rowland	Mahindra	1:08.101	—N/a	1:07.780	—N/a	—N/a	10^{1}
8	13	(Portugal) António Félix da Costa	Techeetah-DS	—N/a	1:07.806	No time^{2}	—N/a	—N/a	7
9	27	(United Kingdom) Jake Dennis	Andretti-BMW	1:08.419	—N/a	—N/a	—N/a	—N/a	8
10	29	(United Kingdom) Alexander Sims	Mahindra	—N/a	1:08.011	—N/a	—N/a	—N/a	9
11	94	(Germany) Pascal Wehrlein	Porsche	1:08.454	—N/a	—N/a	—N/a	—N/a	11
12	5	(Belgium) Stoffel Vandoorne	Mercedes	—N/a	1:08.257	—N/a	—N/a	—N/a	12
13	28	(United States) Oliver Askew	Andretti-BMW	1:08.626	—N/a	—N/a	—N/a	—N/a	13
14	22	(Germany) Maximilian Günther	e.dams-Nissan	—N/a	1:08.339	—N/a	—N/a	—N/a	14
15	23	(Switzerland) Sébastien Buemi	e.dams-Nissan	1:08.829	—N/a	—N/a	—N/a	—N/a	15
16	9	(New Zealand) Mitch Evans	Jaguar	—N/a	1:08.368	—N/a	—N/a	—N/a	16
17	3	(United Kingdom) Oliver Turvey	NIO	1:08.943	—N/a	—N/a	—N/a	—N/a	17
18	33	(United Kingdom) Dan Ticktum	NIO	—N/a	1:08.753	—N/a	—N/a	—N/a	18
19	7	(Brazil) Sérgio Sette Câmara	Dragon-Penske	No time^{3}	—N/a	—N/a	—N/a	—N/a	19
20	99	(Italy) Antonio Giovinazzi	Dragon-Penske	—N/a	1:08.811	—N/a	—N/a	—N/a	20
21	37	(New Zealand) Nick Cassidy	Envision-Audi	No time	—N/a	—N/a	—N/a	—N/a	22^{4}
22	10	(United Kingdom) Sam Bird	Jaguar	—N/a	1:13.910	—N/a	—N/a	—N/a	21

Notes:

- ^1 – Oliver Rowland received a 3-place grid penalty for causing a collision in race one.
- ^2 – António Félix da Costa had his quarter-final duel lap time deleted for missing his slot.
- ^3 – Sérgio Sette Câmara had all his qualifying lap times cancelled for impeding another driver.
- ^4 – Nick Cassidy did not take part in qualifying as his team could not repair his car in time following an accident in free practice. He was allowed to start the race from the back of the grid.

==== Race ====
Pos.	No.	Driver	Team	Laps	Time/Retired	Grid	Points
1	48	(Switzerland) Edoardo Mortara	Venturi-Mercedes	35	47:02.131	2	25
2	4	(Netherlands) Robin Frijns	Envision-Audi	35	+0.451	3	18
3	11	(Brazil) Lucas di Grassi	Venturi-Mercedes	35	+0.912	4	15
4	36	(Germany) André Lotterer	Porsche	35	+1.125	5	12
5	27	(United Kingdom) Jake Dennis	Andretti-BMW	35	+1.646	8	10
6	25	(France) Jean-Éric Vergne	Techeetah-DS	35	+3.166	6	8
7	5	(Belgium) Stoffel Vandoorne	Mercedes	35	+3.568	12	6+1^{1}
8	30	(United Kingdom) Oliver Rowland	Mahindra	35	+4.235	10	4
9	94	(Germany) Pascal Wehrlein	Porsche	35	+4.962	11	2
10	17	(Netherlands) Nyck de Vries	Mercedes	35	+5.294	1	1+3^{2}
11	28	(United States) Oliver Askew	Andretti-BMW	35	+6.732	13	
12	13	(Portugal) António Félix da Costa	Techeetah-DS	35	+8.693	7	
13	23	(Switzerland) Sébastien Buemi	e.dams-Nissan	35	+9.015	15	
14	22	(Germany) Maximilian Günther	e.dams-Nissan	35	+9.464	14	
15	10	(United Kingdom) Sam Bird	Jaguar	35	+11.690	21	
16	37	(New Zealand) Nick Cassidy	Envision-Audi	35	+13.973	22	
17	7	(Brazil) Sérgio Sette Câmara	Dragon-Penske	35	+14.521	19	
18	3	(United Kingdom) Oliver Turvey	NIO	35	+15.005	17	
19	33	(United Kingdom) Dan Ticktum	NIO	35	+16.744	18	
20	99	(Italy) Antonio Giovinazzi	Dragon-Penske	35	+17.681	20	
21	9	(New Zealand) Mitch Evans	Jaguar	35	+29.872^{3}	16	
Ret	29	(United Kingdom) Alexander Sims	Mahindra	29	Accident	9	

Notes:

- ^1 – Fastest lap.
- ^2 – Pole position.
- ^3 – Mitch Evans received a post-race drive-through penalty converted into a 24-second time penalty for failing to activate the second of the two mandatory attack modes.

==== Standings after the race ====
Drivers' Championship standings

	Pos	Driver	Points
5	1	(Switzerland) Edoardo Mortara	33
1	2	(Netherlands) Nyck de Vries	29
1	3	(Belgium) Stoffel Vandoorne	28
1	4	(Brazil) Lucas di Grassi	25
2	5	(United Kingdom) Jake Dennis	25

Teams' Championship standings

	Pos	Constructor	Points
1	1	(Monaco) Venturi-Mercedes	58
1	2	(Germany) Mercedes	57
	3	(United States) Andretti-BMW	27
1	4	(United Kingdom) Envision-Audi	25
2	5	(Germany) Porsche	14

- Notes: Only the top five positions are included for both sets of standings.

== Notes ==
Previous race: 2021 Berlin ePrix	FIA Formula E World Championship; 2021–22 season	Next race: 2022 Mexico City ePrix
Previous race: 2021 Diriyah ePrix	Diriyah ePrix	Next race: 2023 Diriyah ePrix
