= 2021 Berlin ePrix =

Race 14 of 15 of the 2020–21 Formula E season
← Previous race

Race details
- Date: 14 August 2021
- Official name: 2021 BMW i Berlin E-Prix I presented by CBMM Niobium
- Location: Tempelhof Airport Street Circuit, Berlin
- Course: Street circuit
- Course length: 2.355 km (1.463 mi)
- Distance: 38 laps, 89.490 km (55.607 mi)

Pole position
Driver	(France) Jean-Éric Vergne	Techeetah-DS
- Time: 1:06.227

Fastest lap
Driver	(Germany) René Rast	Audi
- Time: 1:08.908 on lap 16

Podium
First	(Brazil) Lucas di Grassi	Audi
Second	(Switzerland) Edoardo Mortara	Venturi-Mercedes
Third	(New Zealand) Mitch Evans	Jaguar

2021 Berlin ePrix
Race 15 of 15 of the 2020–21 Formula E season
← Previous race
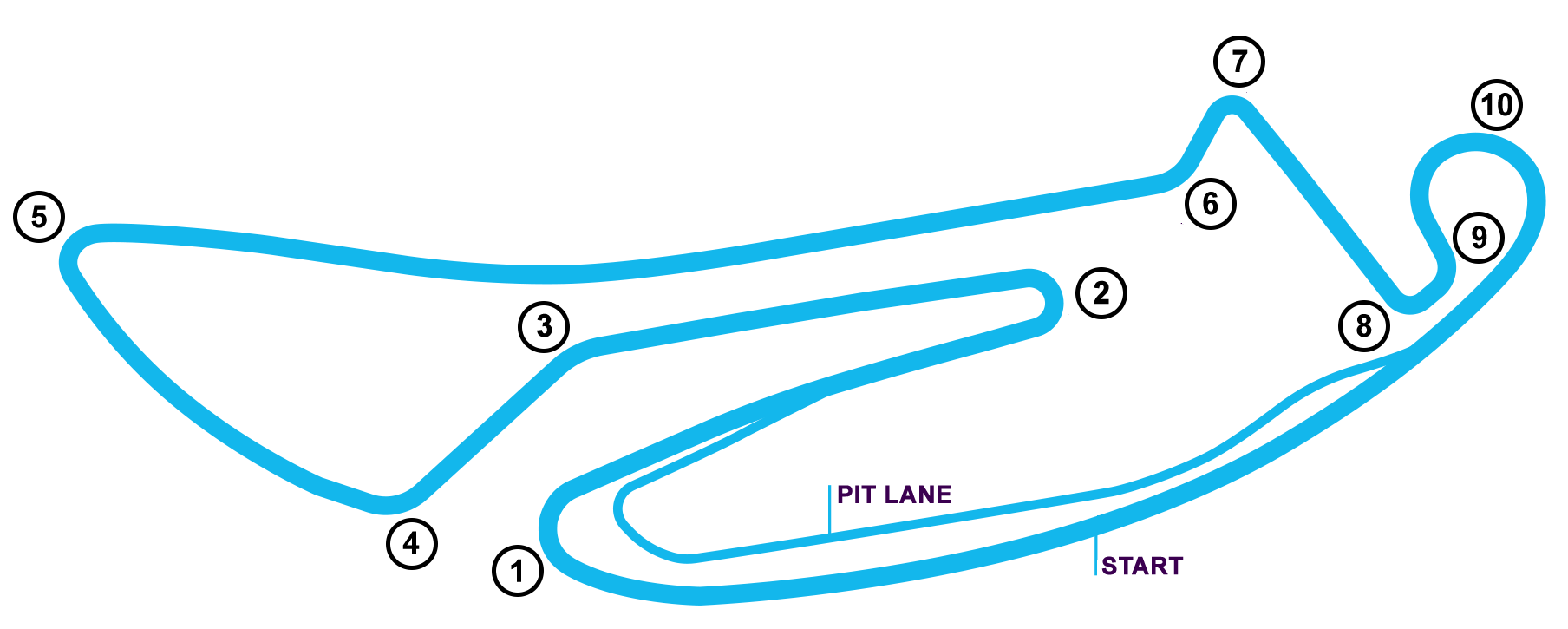

Race details
- Date: 15 August 2021
- Official name: 2021 BMW i Berlin E-Prix II presented by CBMM Niobium
- Location: Tempelhof Airport Street Circuit, Berlin
- Course: Street circuit
- Course length: 2.355 km (1.463 mi)
- Distance: 36 laps, 84.780 km (52.680 mi)

Pole position
Driver	(Belgium) Stoffel Vandoorne	Mercedes
- Time: 1:06.794

Fastest lap
Driver	(Brazil) Lucas di Grassi (Germany) René Rast (Note: Rast received the point for fastest lap as Di Grassi failed to finish in the top 10.)	Audi; Audi
- Time: 1:08.305 (1:08.486) on lap 31 (27)

Podium
First	(France) Norman Nato	Venturi-Mercedes
Second	(United Kingdom) Oliver Rowland	e.dams-Nissan
Third	(Belgium) Stoffel Vandoorne	Mercedes

The 2021 Berlin ePrix (formally the 2021 BMW i Berlin E-Prix presented by CBMM Niobium) was a pair of Formula E electric car races held at the Tempelhof Airport Street Circuit at Tempelhof Airport in the outskirts of Berlin on 14 and 15 August 2021. They were the fourteenth and fifteenth rounds of the 2020–21 championship, marking the series' season finale for the second consecutive year. This was the seventh iteration of the Berlin ePrix, the only event to have featured in all Formula E seasons. Similarly to 2020, race one was run on the traditional track layout, with a reversal thereof being used in race two. This however meant that the event was not a conventional double-header, instead both races were treated separately in official documents.

The first race was won by Lucas di Grassi, with Edoardo Mortara and Mitch Evans rounding out the podium. Norman Nato took his maiden Formula E victory in the second race, finishing ahead of Oliver Rowland and Stoffel Vandoorne. The event saw Nyck de Vries and his Mercedes-EQ Formula E Team crowned first ever Formula E world champions.

== Classification ==
=== Round 14 ===
==== Qualifying ====
Group draw
Group 1	(Netherlands) DEV (1)	(Netherlands) FRI (2)	(United Kingdom) BIR (3)	(United Kingdom) DEN (4)	(Portugal) DAC (5)	(United Kingdom) LYN (6)
Group 2	(New Zealand) CAS (7)	(New Zealand) EVA (8)	(Switzerland) MOR (9)	(Germany) RAS (10)	(Germany) WEH (11)	(France) JEV (12)
Group 3	(Belgium) VAN (13)	(Brazil) DIG (14)	(Germany) GUE (15)	(United Kingdom) ROW (16)	(Germany) LOT (17)	(United Kingdom) SIM (18)
Group 4	(Switzerland) BUE (20)	(France) NAT (21)	(Brazil) SET (22)	(United Kingdom) TUR (23)	(United Kingdom) BLO (24)	(Sweden) ERI (25)

Pos.	No.	Driver	Team	GS	SP	Grid
1	25	(France) Jean-Éric Vergne	Techeetah-DS	**1:06.239**	**1:06.227**	1
2	13	(Portugal) António Félix da Costa	Techeetah-DS	1:06.486	1:06.300	2
3	11	(Brazil) Lucas di Grassi	Audi	1:06.555	1:06.427	3
4	48	(Switzerland) Edoardo Mortara	Venturi-Mercedes	1:06.426	1:06.442	4
5	71	(France) Norman Nato	Venturi-Mercedes	1:06.425	1:06.489	5
6	23	(Switzerland) Sébastien Buemi	e.dams-Nissan	1:06.509	1:07.011	6
7	20	(New Zealand) Mitch Evans	Jaguar	1:06.568	—N/a	7
8	27	(United Kingdom) Jake Dennis	Andretti-BMW	1:06.592	—N/a	8
9	99	(Germany) Pascal Wehrlein	Porsche	1:06.612	—N/a	9
10	28	(Germany) Maximilian Günther	Andretti-BMW	1:06.627	—N/a	10
11	22	(United Kingdom) Oliver Rowland	e.dams-Nissan	1:06.658	—N/a	11
12	10	(United Kingdom) Sam Bird	Jaguar	1:06.713	—N/a	15^{1}
13	33	(Germany) René Rast	Audi	1:06.729	—N/a	12
14	37	(New Zealand) Nick Cassidy	Virgin-Audi	1:06.736	—N/a	13
15	36	(Germany) André Lotterer	Porsche	1:06.789	—N/a	14
16	29	(United Kingdom) Alexander Sims	Mahindra	1:06.814	—N/a	16
17	88	(United Kingdom) Tom Blomqvist	NIO	1:06.837	—N/a	17
18	7	(Brazil) Sérgio Sette Câmara	Dragon-Penske	1:06.852	—N/a	18
19	17	(Netherlands) Nyck de Vries	Mercedes	1:06.902	—N/a	19
20	8	(United Kingdom) Oliver Turvey	NIO	1:06.948	—N/a	20
21	94	(United Kingdom) Alex Lynn	Mahindra	1:06.972	—N/a	21
22	5	(Belgium) Stoffel Vandoorne	Mercedes	1:07.006	—N/a	22
23	4	(Netherlands) Robin Frijns	Virgin-Audi	1:07.156	—N/a	23
24	6	(Sweden) Joel Eriksson	Dragon-Penske	1:07.815	—N/a	24

Notes:

- **^1** – Sam Bird received a 3-place grid penalty for causing a collision in the previous race in London.

==== Race ====
Pos.	No.	Driver	Team	Laps	Time/Retired	Grid	Points
1	**11**	(Brazil) **Lucas di Grassi**	**Audi**	**38**	**46:22.528**	**3**	**25**
2	**48**	(Switzerland) **Edoardo Mortara**	**Venturi-Mercedes**	**38**	**+0.141**	**4**	**18**
3	**20**	(New Zealand) **Mitch Evans**	**Jaguar**	**38**	**+5.499**	**7**	**15**
4	**71**	(France) **Norman Nato**	**Venturi-Mercedes**	**38**	**+5.589**	**5**	**12**
5	**27**	(United Kingdom) **Jake Dennis**	**Andretti-BMW**	**38**	**+5.830**	**8**	**10**
6	**25**	(France) **Jean-Éric Vergne**	**Techeetah-DS**	**38**	**+6.411**	**1**	**8+3+1**^{1}
7	**13**	(Portugal) **António Félix da Costa**	**Techeetah-DS**	**38**	**+6.777**	**2**	**6**
8	**28**	(Germany) **Maximilian Günther**	**Andretti-BMW**	**38**	**+7.562**	**10**	**4**
9	**33**	(Germany) **René Rast**	**Audi**	**38**	**+7.798**	**12**	**2+1**^{2}
10	**36**	(Germany) **André Lotterer**	**Porsche**	**38**	**+14.124**	**14**	**1**
11	23	(Switzerland) Sébastien Buemi	e.dams-Nissan	38	+15.546	6	
12	5	(Belgium) Stoffel Vandoorne	Mercedes	38	+16.214	22	
13	22	(United Kingdom) Oliver Rowland	e.dams-Nissan	38	+16.814	11	
14	37	(New Zealand) Nick Cassidy	Virgin-Audi	38	+16.917	13	
15	4	(Netherlands) Robin Frijns	Virgin-Audi	38	+21.278	23	
16	6	(Sweden) Joel Eriksson	Dragon-Penske	38	+23.666	24	
17	29	(United Kingdom) Alexander Sims	Mahindra	38	+29.019	16	
18	7	(Brazil) Sérgio Sette Câmara	Dragon-Penske	38	+30.962	18	
19	8	(United Kingdom) Oliver Turvey	NIO	38	+33.199	20	
20	94	(United Kingdom) Alex Lynn	Mahindra	38	+33.438	21	
21	99	(Germany) Pascal Wehrlein	Porsche	38	+33.781	9	
22	17	(Netherlands) Nyck de Vries	Mercedes	37	+1 lap	19	
NC	88	(United Kingdom) Tom Blomqvist	NIO	32	+8 laps	17	
Ret	10	(United Kingdom) Sam Bird	Jaguar	8	Technical	15	

Notes:

- **^1** – Pole position; fastest in group stage.
- **^2** – Fastest lap.

==== Standings after the race ====
Drivers' Championship standings

	Pos	Driver	Points
	1	(Netherlands) **Nyck de Vries***	95
7	2	(Switzerland) **Edoardo Mortara***	92
1	3	(United Kingdom) **Jake Dennis***	91
4	4	(New Zealand) **Mitch Evans***	90
3	5	(Netherlands) **Robin Frijns***	89

Teams' Championship standings

	Pos	Constructor	Points
2	1	(United Kingdom) **Jaguar***	171
2	2	(China) **Techeetah-DS***	166
2	3	(United Kingdom) **Virgin-Audi***	165
2	4	(Germany) **Audi***	162
3	5	(Germany) **Mercedes***	158

- Notes: Only the top five positions are included for both sets of standings.

Bold text indicates who still has a theoretical chance of becoming World Champion.

=== Round 15 ===
==== Qualifying ====
Group draw
Group 1	(Netherlands) DEV (1)	(Switzerland) MOR (2)	(United Kingdom) DEN (3)	(New Zealand) EVA (4)	(Netherlands) FRI (5)	(Brazil) DIG (6)
Group 2	(Portugal) DAC (7)	(United Kingdom) BIR (8)	(France) JEV (9)	(United Kingdom) LYN (10)	(New Zealand) CAS (11)	(Germany) RAS (12)
Group 3	(Germany) WEH (13)	(Germany) GUE (14)	(Belgium) VAN (15)	(United Kingdom) ROW (16)	(Germany) LOT (17)	(United Kingdom) SIM (18)
Group 4	(France) NAT (20)	(Switzerland) BUE (21)	(Brazil) SET (22)	(United Kingdom) TUR (23)	(United Kingdom) BLO (24)	(Sweden) ERI (25)

Pos.	No.	Driver	Team	GS	SP	Grid
1	5	(Belgium) Stoffel Vandoorne	Mercedes	**1:06.678**	**1:06.794**	1
2	22	(United Kingdom) Oliver Rowland	e.dams-Nissan	1:06.711	1:06.925	2
3	20	(New Zealand) Mitch Evans	Jaguar	1:07.083	1:07.010	3
4	29	(United Kingdom) Alexander Sims	Mahindra	1:06.887	1:07.041	4
5	88	(United Kingdom) Tom Blomqvist	NIO	1:06.916	1:07.106	5
6	71	(France) Norman Nato	Venturi-Mercedes	1:06.806	no time	6
7	36	(Germany) André Lotterer	Porsche	1:07.088	—N/a	7
8	23	(Switzerland) Sébastien Buemi	e.dams-Nissan	1:07.100	—N/a	8
9	27	(United Kingdom) Jake Dennis	Andretti-BMW	1:07.106	—N/a	9
10	99	(Germany) Pascal Wehrlein	Porsche	1:07.114	—N/a	10
11	48	(Switzerland) Edoardo Mortara	Venturi-Mercedes	1:07.139	—N/a	11
12	7	(Brazil) Sérgio Sette Câmara	Dragon-Penske	1:07.150	—N/a	12
13	17	(Netherlands) Nyck de Vries	Mercedes	1:07.162	—N/a	13
14	94	(United Kingdom) Alex Lynn	Mahindra	1:07.164	—N/a	14
15	13	(Portugal) António Félix da Costa	Techeetah-DS	1:07.177	—N/a	15
16	25	(France) Jean-Éric Vergne	Techeetah-DS	1:07.190	—N/a	16
17	11	(Brazil) Lucas di Grassi	Audi	1:07.209	—N/a	17
18	28	(Germany) Maximilian Günther	Andretti-BMW	1:07.227	—N/a	18
19	33	(Germany) René Rast	Audi	1:07.268	—N/a	19
20	8	(United Kingdom) Oliver Turvey	NIO	1:07.300	—N/a	20
21	4	(Netherlands) Robin Frijns	Virgin-Audi	1:07.325	—N/a	21
22	10	(United Kingdom) Sam Bird	Jaguar	1:07.365	—N/a	22
23	6	(Sweden) Joel Eriksson	Dragon-Penske	1:07.461	—N/a	23
24	37	(New Zealand) Nick Cassidy	Virgin-Audi	1:07.980	—N/a	24

==== Race ====
Pos.	No.	Driver	Team	Laps	Time/Retired	Grid	Points
1	**71**	(France) **Norman Nato**	**Venturi-Mercedes**	**36**	**1:11:57.152**	**6**	**25**
2	**22**	(United Kingdom) **Oliver Rowland**	**e.dams-Nissan**	**36**	**+2.270**	**2**	**18**
3	**5**	(Belgium) **Stoffel Vandoorne**	**Mercedes**	**36**	**+2.837**	**1**	**15+3+1**^{1}
4	**36**	(Germany) **André Lotterer**	**Porsche**	**36**	**+7.105**	**7**	**12**
5	**29**	(United Kingdom) **Alexander Sims**	**Mahindra**	**36**	**+8.453**	**4**	**10**
6	**99**	(Germany) **Pascal Wehrlein**	**Porsche**	**36**	**+8.847**	**10**	**8**
7	**10**	(United Kingdom) **Sam Bird**	**Jaguar**	**36**	**+10.473**	**22**	**6**
8	**17**	(Netherlands) **Nyck de Vries**	**Mercedes**	**36**	**+11.108**	**13**	**4**
9	**33**	(Germany) **René Rast**	**Audi**	**36**	**+12.189**	**19**	**2+1**^{2}
10	**88**	(United Kingdom) **Tom Blomqvist**	**NIO**	**36**	**+12.679**	**5**	**1**
11	25	(France) Jean-Éric Vergne	Techeetah-DS	36	+13.437	16	
12	4	(Netherlands) Robin Frijns	Virgin-Audi	36	+13.748	21	
13	94	(United Kingdom) Alex Lynn	Mahindra	36	+14.366	14	
14	23	(Switzerland) Sébastien Buemi	e.dams-Nissan	36	+14.692	8	
15	28	(Germany) Maximilian Günther	Andretti-BMW	36	+15.528	18	
16	6	(Sweden) Joel Eriksson	Dragon-Penske	36	+15.940	23	
17	37	(New Zealand) Nick Cassidy	Virgin-Audi	36	+16.306	24	
18	7	(Brazil) Sérgio Sette Câmara	Dragon-Penske	36	+16.961	12	
19	8	(United Kingdom) Oliver Turvey	NIO	36	+21.076	20	
20	11	(Brazil) Lucas di Grassi	Audi	36	+35.155	17	
Ret	13	(Portugal) António Félix da Costa	Techeetah-DS	21	Collision	15	
Ret	27	(United Kingdom) Jake Dennis	Andretti-BMW	2	Rear axle/Accident	9	
Ret	20	(New Zealand) Mitch Evans	Jaguar	0	Collision	3	
Ret	48	(Switzerland) Edoardo Mortara	Venturi-Mercedes	0	Collision	11	

Notes:

- **^1** – Pole position; fastest in group stage.
- **^2** – Fastest lap.

==== Standings after the race ====
Drivers' Championship standings

Pos	Driver	Points
1	(Netherlands) **Nyck de Vries***	99
2	(Switzerland) Edoardo Mortara	92
3	(United Kingdom) Jake Dennis	91
4	(New Zealand) Mitch Evans	90
5	(Netherlands) Robin Frijns	89

Teams' Championship standings

	Pos	Constructor	Points
4	1	(Germany) **Mercedes***	181
1	2	(United Kingdom) Jaguar	177
1	3	(China) Techeetah-DS	166
	4	(Germany) Audi	165
2	5	(United Kingdom) Virgin-Audi	165

- Notes: Only the top five positions are included for both sets of standings.
- Bold text indicates the world champions.

== Notes ==
Previous race: 2021 London ePrix	FIA Formula E World Championship; 2020–21 season	Next race: 2022 Diriyah ePrix
Previous race: 2020 Berlin ePrix	Berlin ePrix	Next race: 2022 Berlin ePrix
