= 2019 Diriyah ePrix =

Race 1 of 11 of the 2019–20 Formula E season
Next race →
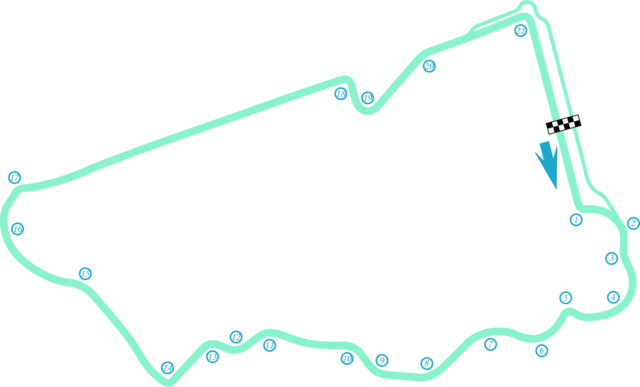

Race details
- Date: 22 November 2019
- Official name: 2019 Saudia Diriyah E-Prix
- Location: Riyadh Street Circuit, Diriyah, Riyadh, Saudi Arabia
- Course: Street circuit
- Course length: 2.495 km (1.550 mi)
- Distance: 34 laps, 77.345 km (48.060 mi)

Pole position
Driver	(United Kingdom) Alexander Sims	Andretti-BMW
- Time: 1:14.563

Fastest lap
Driver	(Germany) Daniel Abt	Audi
- Time: 1:13.742 on lap 22

Podium
First	(United Kingdom) Sam Bird	Virgin-Audi
Second	(Germany) André Lotterer	Porsche
Third	(Belgium) Stoffel Vandoorne	Mercedes

2019 Diriyah ePrix
Race 2 of 11 of the 2019–20 Formula E season
Next race →
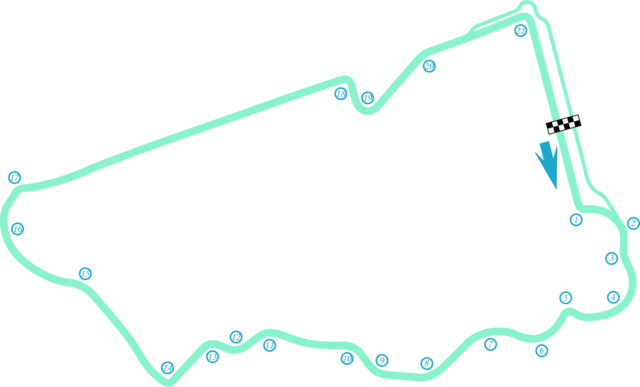

Race details
- Date: 23 November 2019
- Official name: 2019 SAUDIA Diriyah E-Prix
- Location: Riyadh Street Circuit, Diriyah, Riyadh, Saudi Arabia
- Course: Street circuit
- Course length: 2.495 km (1.550 mi)
- Distance: 30 laps, 74.850 km (46.510 mi)

Pole position
Driver	(United Kingdom) Alexander Sims	Andretti-BMW
- Time: 1:11.479

Fastest lap
Driver	(Portugal) António Félix da Costa	Techeetah-DS
- Time: 1:12.481 on lap 30

Podium
First	(United Kingdom) Alexander Sims	Andretti-BMW
Second	(Brazil) Lucas di Grassi	Audi
Third	(Belgium) Stoffel Vandoorne	Mercedes

The 2019 Diriyah ePrix (officially the 2019 ABB FIA Formula E Saudia Diriyah ePrix) was a pair Formula E electric car race held at the Riyadh Street Circuit in the town of Diriyah, north-west of Riyadh, in Saudi Arabia on 22 and 23 November 2019. It formed the first and second rounds of the 2019–20 Formula E season and was the second edition of the Diriyah ePrix. The first race was won by Sam Bird with Andre Lotterer and Stoffel Vandoorne completing the podium. Alexander Sims won the second race.

== Classification ==
=== Race one ===
==== Qualifying ====
Group draw
Group 1	(France) JEV (1)	(Switzerland) BUE (2)	(Brazil) DIG (3)	(Netherlands) FRI (4)	(New Zealand) EVA (5)	(Portugal) DAC (6)
Group 2	(Germany) ABT (7)	(Germany) LOT (8)	(United Kingdom) BIR (9)	(United Kingdom) ROW (10)	(Belgium) DAM (11)	(Germany) WEH (12)
Group 3	(United Kingdom) SIM (13)	(Switzerland) MOR (14)	(Brazil) MAS (15)	(Belgium) VAN (16)	(Germany) GUE (17)	(United Kingdom) TUR (20)
Group 4	(New Zealand) HAR (–)	(Switzerland) MUL (–)	(Netherlands) DEV (–)	(Switzerland) JAN (–)	(United Kingdom) CAL (–)	(China) QMA (–)

Pos.	No.	Driver	Team	GS	SP	Grid
1	27	(United Kingdom) Alexander Sims	Andretti-BMW	1:15.255	1:14.563	1
2	5	(Belgium) Stoffel Vandoorne	Mercedes	1:15.151	1:14.839	2
3	17	(Netherlands) Nyck de Vries	Mercedes	1:15.027	1:14.929	3
4	48	(Switzerland) Edoardo Mortara	Venturi-Mercedes	1:15.254	1:15.131	4
5	2	(United Kingdom) Sam Bird	Virgin-Audi	1:14.946	1:15.350	5
6	64	(Belgium) Jérôme d'Ambrosio	Mahindra	1:15.273	1:15.539	6
7	36	(Germany) André Lotterer	Porsche	1:15.518	—N/a	7
8	22	(United Kingdom) Oliver Rowland	e.dams-Nissan	1:15.653	—N/a	8
9	28	(Germany) Maximilian Günther	Andretti-BMW	1:15.680	—N/a	9
10	3	(United Kingdom) Oliver Turvey	NIO	1:16.018	—N/a	10
11	25	(France) Jean-Éric Vergne	Techeetah-DS	1:16.129	—N/a	11
12	4	(Netherlands) Robin Frijns	Virgin-Audi	1:16.200	—N/a	12
13	94	(Germany) Pascal Wehrlein	Mahindra	1:16.200	—N/a	13
14	23	(Switzerland) Sébastien Buemi	e.dams-Nissan	1:16.243	—N/a	14
15	66	(Germany) Daniel Abt	Audi	1:16.264	—N/a	15
16	20	(New Zealand) Mitch Evans	Jaguar	1:16.532	—N/a	16
17	19	(Brazil) Felipe Massa	Venturi-Mercedes	1:16.583	—N/a	17
18	6	(New Zealand) Brendon Hartley	Dragon-Penske	1:17.074	—N/a	18
19	11	(Brazil) Lucas di Grassi	Audi	1:17.213	—N/a	19
20	18	(Switzerland) Neel Jani	Porsche	1:17.745	—N/a	20
21	13	(Portugal) António Félix da Costa	Techeetah-DS	1:18.613	—N/a	21
22	33	(China) Ma Qinghua	NIO	1:21.701	—N/a	22
DSQ	7	(Switzerland) Nico Müller	Dragon-Penske	1:23.017	—N/a	23^{1}
DSQ	51	(United Kingdom) James Calado	Jaguar	1:23.792	—N/a	24^{1}

Notes:

- ^1 – Nico Müller and James Calado were disqualified from the session after disrespecting Parc fermé regulations in order to allow repairs to their damaged cars. The Stewards allowed Müller and Calado to start from the back of the grid.

==== Race ====
Pos.	No.	Driver	Team	Laps	Time/Retired	Grid	Points
1	2	(United Kingdom) Sam Bird	Virgin-Audi	34	46:17.371	5	25+1^{3}
2	36	(Germany) André Lotterer	Porsche	34	+1.319	7	18
3	5	(Belgium) Stoffel Vandoorne	Mercedes	34	+1.672	2	15
4	22	(United Kingdom) Oliver Rowland	e.dams-Nissan	34	+1.944	8	12
5	4	(Netherlands) Robin Frijns	Virgin-Audi	34	+3.983	12	10
6	17	(Netherlands) Nyck de Vries	Mercedes	34	+4.560	3	8
7	48	(Switzerland) Edoardo Mortara	Venturi-Mercedes	34	+5.122	4	6
8	27	(United Kingdom) Alexander Sims	Andretti-BMW	34	+5.715	1	4+3^{4}
9	64	(Belgium) Jérôme d'Ambrosio	Mahindra	34	+6.628	6	2
10	20	(New Zealand) Mitch Evans	Jaguar	34	+7.048	16	1+1^{5}
11	94	(Germany) Pascal Wehrlein	Mahindra	34	+7.460	13	
12	19	(Brazil) Felipe Massa	Venturi-Mercedes	34	+8.166	17	
13	11	(Brazil) Lucas di Grassi	Audi	34	+8.404	19	
14	13	(Portugal) António Félix da Costa	Techeetah-DS	34	+8.853	21	
15	3	(United Kingdom) Oliver Turvey	NIO	34	+10.172	10	
16	51	(United Kingdom) James Calado	Jaguar	34	+11.572	24	
17	18	(Switzerland) Neel Jani	Porsche	34	+15.429	20	
18	28	(Germany) Maximilian Günther	Andretti-BMW	34	+25.662	8	
19	6	(New Zealand) Brendon Hartley	Dragon-Penske	34	+52.219^{1}	18	
20	33	(China) Ma Qinghua	NIO	33	+1 lap^{2}	22	
Ret	66	(Germany) Daniel Abt	Audi	29	Accident	15	
Ret	25	(France) Jean-Éric Vergne	Techeetah-DS	21	Steering	11	
Ret	23	(Switzerland) Sébastien Buemi	e.dams-Nissan	3	Technical	14	
DNS	7	(Switzerland) Nico Müller	Dragon-Penske	0	Did not start	23	

Notes:

- ^1 – Brendon Hartley received a ten-second time penalty for being unable to fulfill the complete time of the second attack mode.
- ^2 – Ma Qinghua received a drive-through penalty converted into a 24-second time penalty for not respecting the homologated throttle pedal map.
- ^3 – Fastest in group stage.
- ^4 – Pole position.
- ^5 – Fastest lap.

=== Standings after the race ===
Drivers' Championship standings

+/–	Pos	Driver	Points
	1	(United Kingdom) Sam Bird	26
	2	(Germany) André Lotterer	18
	3	(Belgium) Stoffel Vandoorne	15
	4	(United Kingdom) Oliver Rowland	12
	5	(Netherlands) Robin Frijns	10

Teams' Championship standings

+/–	Pos	Constructor	Points
	1	(United Kingdom) Virgin-Audi	36
	2	(Germany) Mercedes	23
	3	(Germany) Porsche	18
	4	(France) e.Dams-Nissan	12
	5	(United States) BMW	7

- Notes: Only the top five positions are included for both sets of standings.

=== Race two ===
==== Qualifying ====
Group draw
Group 1	(United Kingdom) BIR (1)	(Germany) LOT (2)	(Belgium) VAN (3)	(United Kingdom) ROW (4)	(Netherlands) FRI (5)	(Netherlands) DEV (6)
Group 2	(United Kingdom) SIM (7)	(Switzerland) MOR (8)	(Belgium) DAM (9)	(New Zealand) EVA (10)	(Germany) WEH (11)	(Brazil) MAS (12)
Group 3	(Brazil) DIG (13)	(Portugal) DAC (14)	(United Kingdom) TUR (15)	(United Kingdom) CAL (16)	(Switzerland) JAN (17)	(Germany) GUE (18)
Group 4	(New Zealand) HAR (19)	(China) QMA (20)	(Germany) ABT (21)	(France) JEV (22)	(Switzerland) BUE (23)	(Switzerland) MUL (24)

Pos.	No.	Driver	Team	GS	SP	Grid
1	27	(United Kingdom) Alexander Sims	Andretti-BMW	1:11.858	1:11.476	1
2	23	(Switzerland) Sébastien Buemi	e.dams-Nissan	1:11.774	1:11.696	2
3	11	(Brazil) Lucas di Grassi	Audi	1:11.939	1:11.784	3
4	64	(Belgium) Jérôme d'Ambrosio	Mahindra	1:11.835	1:12.093	4
5	13	(Portugal) António Félix da Costa	Techeetah-DS	1:11.418	1:14.134	5
6	20	(New Zealand) Mitch Evans	Jaguar	1:11.972	no time^{1}	6
7	2	(United Kingdom) Sam Bird	Virgin-Audi	1:12.007	—N/a	7
8	48	(Switzerland) Edoardo Mortara	Venturi-Mercedes	1:12.008	—N/a	8
9	28	(Germany) Maximilian Günther	Andretti-BMW	1:12.051	—N/a	9
10	36	(Germany) André Lotterer	Porsche	1:12.153	—N/a	10
11	25	(France) Jean-Éric Vergne	Techeetah-DS	1:12.327	—N/a	24^{2}
12	5	(Belgium) Stoffel Vandoorne	Mercedes	1:12.422	—N/a	11
13	4	(Netherlands) Robin Frijns	Virgin-Audi	1:12.454	—N/a	12
14	94	(Germany) Pascal Wehrlein	Mahindra	1:12.635	—N/a	13
15	66	(Germany) Daniel Abt	Audi	1:12.642	—N/a	14
16	19	(Brazil) Felipe Massa	Venturi-Mercedes	1:12.656	—N/a	15
17	22	(United Kingdom) Oliver Rowland	e.dams-Nissan	1:12.660	—N/a	16
18	3	(United Kingdom) Oliver Turvey	NIO	1:12.671	—N/a	17
19	18	(Switzerland) Neel Jani	Porsche	1:12.732	—N/a	18
20	6	(New Zealand) Brendon Hartley	Dragon-Penske	1:13.182	—N/a	19
21	33	(China) Ma Qinghua	NIO	1:13.205	—N/a	20
22	51	(United Kingdom) James Calado	Jaguar	1:13.430	—N/a	21
23	7	(Switzerland) Nico Müller	Dragon-Penske	1:13.703	—N/a	22
24	17	(Netherlands) Nyck de Vries	Mercedes	1:14.082	—N/a	23

Notes:

- ^1 – Mitch Evans' car was found underweight after Super Pole, and his lap time was deleted.
- ^2 – Jean-Éric Vergne received a twenty-place grid penalty for battery change, forcing him to start from the back of the grid. For being unable to take the full grid drop (by only losing thirteen places on the grid), he also received an additional drive-through penalty at the race.

==== Race ====
Pos.	No.	Driver	Team	Laps	Time/Retired	Grid	Points
1	27	(United Kingdom) Alexander Sims	Andretti-BMW	30	46:48.327	1	25+3^{7}
2	11	(Brazil) Lucas di Grassi	Audi	30	+2.817	3	18
3	5	(Belgium) Stoffel Vandoorne	Mercedes	30	+3.581	11	15
4	48	(Switzerland) Edoardo Mortara	Venturi-Mercedes	30	+4.294	8	12
5	22	(United Kingdom) Oliver Rowland	e.dams-Nissan	30	+5.475	16	10
6	66	(Germany) Daniel Abt	Audi	30	+16.942	14	8
7	51	(United Kingdom) James Calado	Jaguar	30	+17.221	21	6
8	25	(France) Jean-Éric Vergne	Techeetah-DS	30	+19.394	24	4
9	6	(New Zealand) Brendon Hartley	Dragon-Penske	30	+20.702	19	2
10	13	(Portugal) António Félix da Costa	Techeetah-DS	30	+22.634	5	1+1+1^{8}
11	28	(Germany) Maximilian Günther	Andretti-BMW	30	+25.383^{1}	9	
12	23	(Switzerland) Sébastien Buemi	e.dams-Nissan	30	+26.291^{2}	2	
13	18	(Switzerland) Neel Jani	Porsche	30	+27.493	18	
14	36	(Germany) André Lotterer	Porsche	30	+29.046^{1}	10	
15	94	(Germany) Pascal Wehrlein	Mahindra	30	+35.290	13	
16	17	(Netherlands) Nyck de Vries	Mercedes	30	+36.318^{3}	23	
17	19	(Brazil) Felipe Massa	Venturi-Mercedes	30	+45.758^{4}	15	
18	20	(New Zealand) Mitch Evans	Jaguar	30	+1:01.105^{1}	6	
19	33	(China) Ma Qinghua	NIO	30	+1:28.165^{5}	20	
Ret	7	(Switzerland) Nico Müller	Dragon-Penske	28	Puncture	22	
Ret	4	(Netherlands) Robin Frijns	Virgin-Audi	18	Accident	12	
Ret	2	(United Kingdom) Sam Bird	Virgin-Audi	13	Collision damage	7	
DNS	64	(Belgium) Jérôme d'Ambrosio	Mahindra	0	Did not start	4	
DSQ^{6}	3	(United Kingdom) Oliver Turvey	NIO	30	Energy usage	17	

Notes:

- ^1 – Maximilian Günther, André Lotterer and Mitch Evans all received a drive-through penalty converted into 24-second time penalties after overtaking cars under the yellow flag.
- ^2 – Sébastien Buemi received a ten-second time penalty for unsafe rejoin to the track.
- ^3 – Nyck de Vries received a five-second time penalty for a technical infringement. He then received a drive-through penalty converted into a 24-second time penalty after overtaking Oliver Turvey under the yellow flag.
- ^4 – Felipe Massa received a drive-through penalty converted into a 24-second time penalty for speeding in the pit lane.
- ^5 – Ma Qinghua received a drive-through penalty converted into a 24-second time penalty for causing a collision with Nico Müller. He then received a second drive-through penalty converted into a 24-second time penalty after overtaking four cars after the safety car procedure. Ma also received a five-second penalty before the race due to his battery being below 97% on the dummy grid.
- ^6 – Oliver Turvey originally finished eighth and would have gotten promoted to sixth after all penalties having been applied, but was later disqualified as he used 40.06 kWh of total energy, exceeding the 40 kWh maximum.
- ^7 – Pole position.
- ^8 – Fastest in group stage; fastest lap.

=== Standings after the race ===
Drivers' Championship standings

+/–	Pos	Driver	Points
6	1	(United Kingdom) Alexander Sims	35
1	2	(Belgium) Stoffel Vandoorne	30
2	3	(United Kingdom) Sam Bird	26
	4	(United Kingdom) Oliver Rowland	22
8	5	(Brazil) Lucas di Grassi	18

Teams' Championship standings

+/–	Pos	Constructor	Points
1	1	(Germany) Mercedes	38
1	2	(United Kingdom) Virgin-Audi	36
2	3	(United States) BMW	25
5	4	(Germany) Audi	26
1	5	(France) e.Dams-Nissan	22

- Notes: Only the top five positions are included for both sets of standings.

Previous race: 2019 New York City ePrix	FIA Formula E Championship; 2019–20 season	Next race: 2020 Santiago ePrix
Previous race: 2018 Ad Diriyah ePrix	Diriyah ePrix	Next race: 2021 Diriyah ePrix
