= 2022 Berlin ePrix =

Race 7 of 16 of the 2021–22 Formula E season
← Previous race	Next race →

Race details
- Date: 14 May 2022
- Official name: 2022 Shell Recharge Berlin E-Prix I
- Location: Tempelhof Airport Street Circuit, Berlin
- Course: Street circuit
- Course length: 2.355 km (1.463 mi)
- Distance: 40 laps, 94.200 km (58.533 mi)

Pole position
Driver	(Switzerland) Edoardo Mortara	Venturi-Mercedes
- Time: 1:06.093

Fastest lap
Driver	(Brazil) Lucas di Grassi (Germany) Pascal Wehrlein (Note: Wehrlein received the point for fastest lap as di Grassi failed to finish in the top 10.)	Venturi-Mercedes; Porsche
- Time: 1:07.880 (1:07.968) on lap 36 (12)

Podium
First	(Switzerland) Edoardo Mortara	Venturi-Mercedes
Second	(France) Jean-Éric Vergne	Techeetah-DS
Third	(Belgium) Stoffel Vandoorne	Mercedes

2022 Berlin ePrix
← Previous race	Next race →
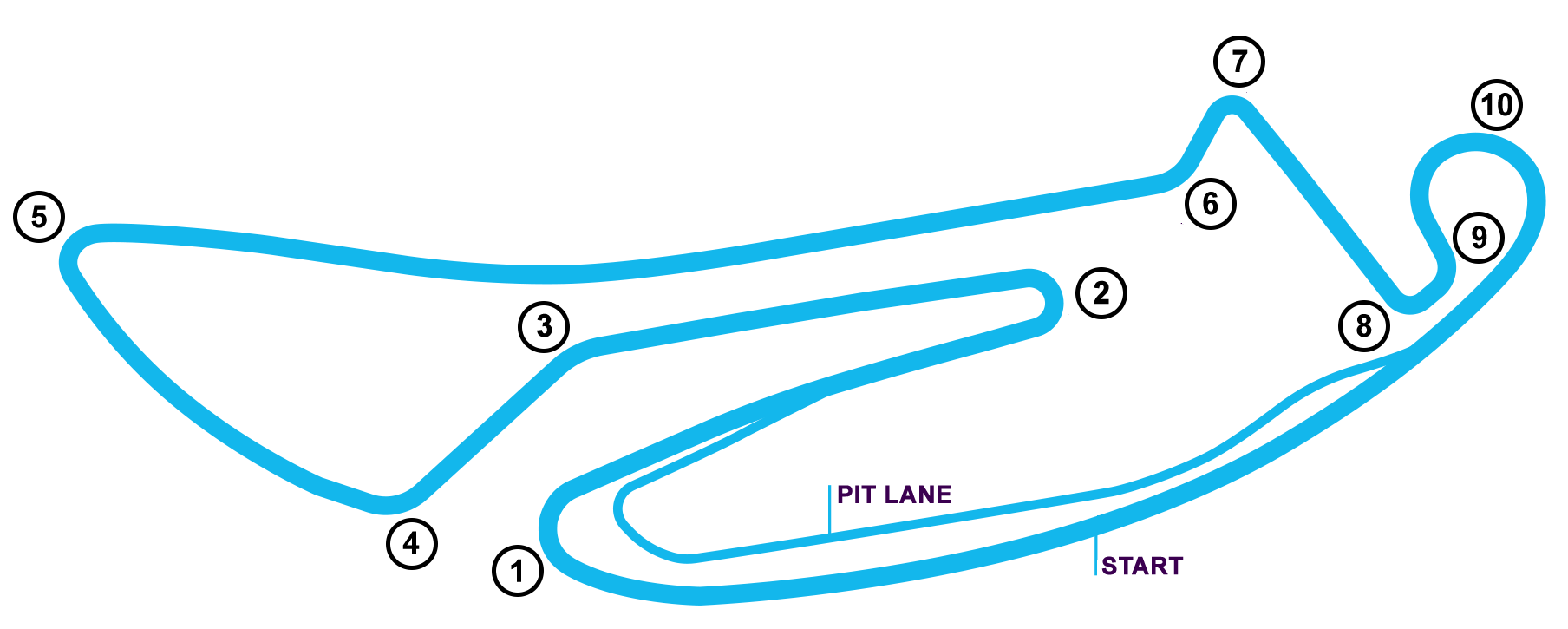

Race details
- Date: 15 May 2022
- Official name: 2022 Shell Recharge Berlin E-Prix II
- Location: Tempelhof Airport Street Circuit, Berlin
- Course: Street circuit
- Course length: 2.355 km (1.463 mi)
- Distance: 40 laps, 94.200 km (58.533 mi)

Pole position
Driver	(Switzerland) Edoardo Mortara	Venturi-Mercedes
- Time: 1:05.972

Fastest lap
Driver	(New Zealand) Nick Cassidy (Switzerland) Edoardo Mortara (Note: Mortara received the point for fastest lap as Cassidy failed to finish in the top 10.)	Envision-Audi; Venturi-Mercedes
- Time: 1:07.849 (1:08.165) on lap 33 (21)

Podium
First	(Netherlands) Nyck de Vries	Mercedes
Second	(Switzerland) Edoardo Mortara	Venturi-Mercedes
Third	(Belgium) Stoffel Vandoorne	Mercedes

The 2022 Berlin ePrix, known for sponsorship reasons as the 2022 Shell Recharge Berlin E-Prix, was a pair of Formula E electric car races held at the Tempelhof Airport Street Circuit at Tempelhof Airport in the outskirts of Berlin, Germany on 14 and 15 May 2022. It served as the seventh and eighth rounds of the 2021–22 Formula E season, and marked the eighth edition of the Berlin ePrix, the only event to have featured in every season of the Formula E championship. The first race was won by Edoardo Mortara for ROKiT Venturi Racing, with Jean-Éric Vergne and Stoffel Vandoorne in second and third place respectively. The second race was won by Nyck de Vries for the Mercedes-EQ team, with Edoardo Mortara and Stoffel Vandoorne completing the podium.

== Classification ==
=== Race one ===
==== Qualifying ====
Group draw
Group A	(Belgium) VAN (1)	(New Zealand) EVA (3)	(Switzerland) MOR (5)	(Germany) WEH (7)	(Brazil) DIG (9)	(United Kingdom) DEN (11)	(New Zealand) CAS (13)	(United Kingdom) TUR (15)	(Germany) GUN (17)	(United Kingdom) TIC (19)	(Brazil) SET (21)
Group B	(France) JEV (2)	(Netherlands) FRI (4)	(Germany) LOT (6)	(Netherlands) DEV (8)	(Portugal) DAC (10)	(United Kingdom) BIR (12)	(Switzerland) BUE (14)	(United Kingdom) ROW (16)	(United States) ASK (18)	(United Kingdom) SIM (20)	(Italy) GIO (22)

===== Qualifying duels =====
Quarter-finals
B4	(United Kingdom) Alexander Sims
A1	(Germany) Pascal Wehrlein
B3	(France) Jean-Éric Vergne
A2	(Belgium) Stoffel Vandoorne
A3	(Switzerland) Edoardo Mortara
B2	(Germany) André Lotterer
A4	(Brazil) Sérgio Sette Câmara
B1	(Portugal) António Félix da Costa

Semi-finals
(United Kingdom) Alexander Sims
(France) Jean-Éric Vergne
(Switzerland) Edoardo Mortara
(Portugal) António Félix da Costa

Final
(United Kingdom) Alexander Sims
(Switzerland) Edoardo Mortara

===== Overall classification =====
Pos.	No.	Driver	Team	A	B	QF	SF	F	Grid
1	48	(Switzerland) Edoardo Mortara	Venturi-Mercedes	1:06.900	—N/a	1:05.954	1:05.914	1:06.093	1
2	29	(United Kingdom) Alexander Sims	Mahindra	—N/a	1:07.243	1:05.939	1:06.050	1:06.230	2
3	13	(Portugal) António Félix da Costa	Techeetah-DS	1:06.739	—N/a	1:06.064	1:05.999	—N/a	3
4	25	(France) Jean-Éric Vergne	Techeetah-DS	—N/a	1:06.908	1:05.893	1:06.050	—N/a	4
5	36	(Germany) André Lotterer	Porsche	—N/a	1:06.767	1:05.962	—N/a	—N/a	5
6	94	(Germany) Pascal Wehrlein	Porsche	1:06.532	—N/a	1:06.157	—N/a	—N/a	6
7	7	(Brazil) Sérgio Sette Câmara	Dragon-Penske	1:06.913	—N/a	1:06.299	—N/a	—N/a	7
8	5	(Belgium) Stoffel Vandoorne	Mercedes	1:06.803	—N/a	1:06.302	—N/a	—N/a	8
9	9	(New Zealand) Mitch Evans	Jaguar	1:07.027	—N/a	—N/a	—N/a	—N/a	9
10	23	(Switzerland) Sébastien Buemi	e.dams-Nissan	—N/a	1:07.320	—N/a	—N/a	—N/a	10
11	27	(United Kingdom) Jake Dennis	Andretti-BMW	1:07.034	—N/a	—N/a	—N/a	—N/a	11
12	17	(Netherlands) Nyck de Vries	Mercedes	—N/a	1:07.333	—N/a	—N/a	—N/a	12
13	11	(Brazil) Lucas di Grassi	Venturi-Mercedes	1:07.132	—N/a	—N/a	—N/a	—N/a	13
14	30	(United Kingdom) Oliver Rowland	Mahindra	—N/a	1:07.358	—N/a	—N/a	—N/a	17
15	3	(United Kingdom) Oliver Turvey	NIO	1:07.229	—N/a	—N/a	—N/a	—N/a	14
16	10	(United Kingdom) Sam Bird	Jaguar	—N/a	1:07.415	—N/a	—N/a	—N/a	15
17	22	(Germany) Maximilian Günther	e.dams-Nissan	1:07.268	—N/a	—N/a	—N/a	—N/a	16
18	99	(Italy) Antonio Giovinazzi	Dragon-Penske	—N/a	1:07.477	—N/a	—N/a	—N/a	18
19	37	(New Zealand) Nick Cassidy	Envision-Audi	1:07.305	—N/a	—N/a	—N/a	—N/a	19
20	4	(Netherlands) Robin Frijns	Envision-Audi	—N/a	1:07.650	—N/a	—N/a	—N/a	20
21	33	(United Kingdom) Dan Ticktum	NIO	1:07.672	—N/a	—N/a	—N/a	—N/a	21
22	28	(United States) Oliver Askew	Andretti-BMW	—N/a	1:07.714	—N/a	—N/a	—N/a	22

==== Race ====
Pos.	No.	Driver	Team	Laps	Time/Retired	Grid	Points
1	48	(Switzerland) Edoardo Mortara	Venturi-Mercedes	40	46:16.175	1	25+3^{1}
2	25	(France) Jean-Éric Vergne	Techeetah-DS	40	+1.782	4	18
3	5	(Belgium) Stoffel Vandoorne	Mercedes	40	+1.987	8	15
4	36	(Germany) André Lotterer	Porsche	40	+2.579	5	12
5	9	(New Zealand) Mitch Evans	Jaguar	40	+3.189	9	10
6	94	(Germany) Pascal Wehrlein	Porsche	40	+5.405	6	8+1^{2}
7	10	(United Kingdom) Sam Bird	Jaguar	40	+5.683	16	6
8	13	(Portugal) António Félix da Costa	Techeetah-DS	40	+6.400	3	4
9	29	(United Kingdom) Alexander Sims	Mahindra	40	+6.569	2	2
10	17	(Netherlands) Nyck de Vries	Mercedes	40	+6.602	12	1
11	30	(United Kingdom) Oliver Rowland	Mahindra	40	+8.141	17	
12	4	(Netherlands) Robin Frijns	Envision-Audi	40	+9.879	20	
13	27	(United Kingdom) Jake Dennis	Andretti-BMW	40	+13.314	11	
14	23	(Switzerland) Sébastien Buemi	e.dams-Nissan	40	+15.275	10	
15	28	(United States) Oliver Askew	Andretti-BMW	40	+22.071	22	
16	3	(United Kingdom) Oliver Turvey	NIO	40	+22.662	14	
17	7	(Brazil) Sérgio Sette Câmara	Dragon-Penske	40	+24.120	7	
18	22	(Germany) Maximilian Günther	e.dams-Nissan	40	+28.716	16	
19	33	(United Kingdom) Dan Ticktum	NIO	40	+30.393	21	
20	99	(Italy) Antonio Giovinazzi	Dragon-Penske	40	+52.025	18	
Ret	11	(Brazil) Lucas di Grassi	Venturi-Mercedes	38	Puncture	13	
Ret	37	(New Zealand) Nick Cassidy	Envision-Audi	31		19	

Notes:

- ^1 – Pole position.
- ^2 – Fastest lap.

==== Standings after the race ====
Drivers' Championship standings

	Pos	Driver	Points
	1	(Belgium) Stoffel Vandoorne	96
	2	(France) Jean-Éric Vergne	93
	3	(New Zealand) Mitch Evans	82
1	4	(Switzerland) Edoardo Mortara	77
1	5	(Netherlands) Robin Frijns	71

Teams' Championship standings

	Pos	Constructor	Points
	1	(Germany) Mercedes	136
	2	(France) Techeetah-DS	127
2	3	(Monaco) Venturi-Mercedes	114
1	4	(United Kingdom) Jaguar	110
1	5	(Germany) Porsche	106

=== Race two ===
Group draw
Group A	(Belgium) VAN (1)	(New Zealand) EVA (3)	(Netherlands) FRI (5)	(Germany) WEH (7)	(Brazil) DIG (9)	(United Kingdom) DEN (11)	(New Zealand) CAS (13)	(United Kingdom) TUR (15)	(United Kingdom) SIM (17)	(United Kingdom) ASK (19)	(Brazil) SET (21)
Group B	(France) JEV (2)	(Switzerland) MOR (4)	(Germany) LOT (6)	(Netherlands) DEV (8)	(Portugal) DAC (10)	(United Kingdom) BIR (12)	(Switzerland) BUE (14)	(United Kingdom) ROW (16)	(Germany) GUN (18)	(United Kingdom) TIC (20)	(Italy) GIO (22)

==== Qualifying duels ====
Quarter-finals
B4	(Germany) André Lotterer
A1	(Belgium) Stoffel Vandoorne
B3	(Portugal) António Félix da Costa
A2	(Netherlands) Robin Frijns
A3	(Brazil) Lucas di Grassi
B2	(Netherlands) Nyck de Vries
A4	(New Zealand) Nick Cassidy
B1	(Switzerland) Edoardo Mortara

Semi-finals
(Germany) André Lotterer
(Netherlands) Robin Frijns
(Netherlands) Nyck de Vries
(Switzerland) Edoardo Mortara

Final
(Netherlands) Robin Frijns
(Switzerland) Edoardo Mortara

==== Overall classification ====
Pos.	No.	Driver	Team	A	B	QF	SF	F	Grid
1	48	(Switzerland) Edoardo Mortara	Venturi-Mercedes	—N/a	1:06.753	1:06.110	1:05.897	1:05.972	1
2	4	(Netherlands) Robin Frijns	Envision-Audi	1:07.327	—N/a	1:06.170	1:06.522	1:06.470	2
3	17	(Netherlands) Nyck de Vries	Mercedes	—N/a	1:07.080	1:06.238	1:06.285	—N/a	3
4	36	(Germany) André Lotterer	Porsche	—N/a	1:07.217	1:06.504	1:06.671	—N/a	4
5	13	(Portugal) António Félix da Costa	Porsche	—N/a	1:07.175	1:06.184	—N/a	—N/a	5
6	37	(New Zealand) Nick Cassidy	Envision-Audi	1:07.370	—N/a	1:06.377	—N/a	—N/a	6
7	7	(Brazil) Lucas di Grassi	Venturi-Mercedes	1:07.356	—N/a	1:06.508	—N/a	—N/a	7
8	5	(Belgium) Stoffel Vandoorne	Mercedes	1:07.115	—N/a	1:06.806	—N/a	—N/a	8
9	25	(France) Jean-Éric Vergne	Techeetah-DS	—N/a	1:07.287	—N/a	—N/a	—N/a	9
10	23	(New Zealand) Mitch Evans	Jaguar	1:07.446	—N/a	—N/a	—N/a	—N/a	22
11	30	(United Kingdom) Oliver Rowland	Mahindra	—N/a	1:07.294	—N/a	—N/a	—N/a	10
12	29	(United Kingdom) Alexander Sims	Mahindra	1:07.450	—N/a	—N/a	—N/a	—N/a	11
13	22	(Germany) Maximilian Günther	e.dams-Nissan	—N/a	1:07.332	—N/a	—N/a	—N/a	12
14	3	(United Kingdom) Oliver Turvey	NIO	1:07.469	—N/a	—N/a	—N/a	—N/a	13
15	10	(United Kingdom) Sam Bird	Jaguar	—N/a	1:07.411	—N/a	—N/a	—N/a	14
16	27	(United Kingdom) Jake Dennis	Andretti-BMW	1:07.525	—N/a	—N/a	—N/a	—N/a	15
17	99	(Italy) Antonio Giovinazzi	Dragon-Penske	—N/a	1:07.437	—N/a	—N/a	—N/a	16
18	7	(Brazil) Sérgio Sette Câmara	Dragon-Penske	1:07.553	—N/a	—N/a	—N/a	—N/a	17
19	23	(Switzerland) Sébastien Buemi	e.dams-Nissan	—N/a	1:07.518	—N/a	—N/a	—N/a	18
20	94	(Germany) Pascal Wehrlein	Porsche	1:07.646	—N/a	—N/a	—N/a	—N/a	19
21	33	(United Kingdom) Dan Ticktum	NIO	—N/a	1:07.601	—N/a	—N/a	—N/a	20
22	28	(United Kingdom) Oliver Askew	Andretti-BMW	1:07.802	—N/a	—N/a	—N/a	—N/a	21

==== Race ====
Pos.	No.	Driver	Team	Laps	Time/Retired	Grid	Points
1	17	(Netherlands) Nyck de Vries	Mercedes	40	46:12.268	3	25
2	48	(Switzerland) Edoardo Mortara	Venturi-Mercedes	40	+2.454	1	18+3^{1}+1^{2}
3	5	(Belgium) Stoffel Vandoorne	Mercedes	40	+6.936	8	15
4	11	(Brazil) Lucas di Grassi	Venturi-Mercedes	40	+8.165	7	12
5	4	(Netherlands) Robin Frijns	Envision-Audi	40	+13.829	2	10
6	13	(Portugal) António Félix da Costa	Techeetah-DS	40	+14.387	5	8
7	30	(United Kingdom) Oliver Rowland	Mahindra	40	+15.518	10	6
8	36	(Germany) André Lotterer	Porsche	40	+15.845	4	4
9	25	(France) Jean-Éric Vergne	Techeetah-DS	40	+18.831	9	2
10	9	(New Zealand) Mitch Evans	Jaguar	40	+21.722	22	1
11	10	(United Kingdom) Sam Bird	Jaguar	40	+22.875	14	
12	94	(Germany) Pascal Wehrlein	Porsche	40	+25.412	19	
13	27	(United Kingdom) Jake Dennis	Andretti-BMW	40	+13.314	15	
14	23	(Switzerland) Sébastien Buemi	e.dams-Nissan	40	+15.275	18	
15	28	(United States) Oliver Askew	Andretti-BMW	40	+22.071	21	
16	22	(Germany) Maximilian Günther	e.dams-Nissan	40	+35.775	12	
17	3	(United Kingdom) Oliver Turvey	NIO	40	+40.044	13	
18	29	(United Kingdom) Alexander Sims	Mahindra	40	+41.542	11	
19	7	(Brazil) Sérgio Sette Câmara	Dragon-Penske	40	+41.860	17	
20	33	(United Kingdom) Dan Ticktum	NIO	40	+51.648	20	
21	37	(New Zealand) Nick Cassidy	Envision-Audi	40	+55.192	6	
22	99	(Italy) Antonio Giovinazzi	Dragon-Penske	40	+1:01.933	16	

Notes:

- ^1 – Pole position.
- ^2 – Fastest lap.

==== Standings after the race ====
Drivers' Championship standings

	Pos	Driver	Points
	1	(Belgium) Stoffel Vandoorne	111
2	2	(Switzerland) Edoardo Mortara	99
1	3	(France) Jean-Éric Vergne	95
1	4	(New Zealand) Mitch Evans	83
	5	(Netherlands) Robin Frijns	81

Teams' Championship standings

	Pos	Constructor	Points
	1	(Germany) Mercedes	176
1	2	(Monaco) Venturi-Mercedes	148
1	3	(France) Techeetah-DS	137
	4	(United Kingdom) Jaguar	111
	5	(Germany) Porsche	110

== Notes ==
Previous race: 2022 Monaco ePrix	FIA Formula E World Championship; 2021–22 season	Next race: 2022 Jakarta ePrix
Previous race: 2021 Berlin ePrix	Berlin ePrix	Next race: 2023 Berlin ePrix
