= Mercedes-EQ Formula E Team =

German racing team which competes in Formula E

(Germany) Mercedes-EQ Formula E Team
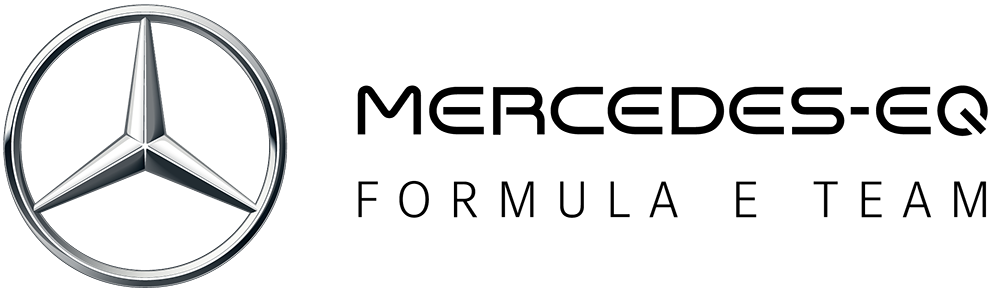
- Founded: 2018 (Note: The team entered the 2018–19 season as HWA Racelab, a customer team using Venturi powertrains. This move was done in order to adapt to the Formula E environment before entering the series as a full-fledged works team.)
- Folded: 2022
- Base: Brixworth, Northamptonshire, United Kingdom (Note: The team shares the Brixworth base with its Formula One counterpart for its powertrain development.); Brackley, Northamptonshire, United Kingdom (Note: HWA continues to run trackside operations of the team, which continues under the Mercedes-Benz banner. Move from Affalterbach to Brackley in 2021.)
- Team principal(s): Ian James
- Former series: Formula E
- Noted drivers: (Belgium) Stoffel Vandoorne (Netherlands) Nyck de Vries
- Races: 42
- Wins: 7
- Podiums: 22
- Poles: 6
- Fastest laps: 5
- Points: 647
- Teams' Championships: FIA Formula E: 2020–21; 2021–22
- Drivers' Championships: FIA Formula E: 2020–21: Nyck de Vries; 2021–22: Stoffel Vandoorne
- First entry: 2019 Diriyah ePrix
- Last entry: 2022 Seoul ePrix
- First win: 2020 Berlin ePrix (R6)
- Last win: 2022 Berlin ePrix (R2)

The Mercedes-EQ Formula E Team was a German racing team that competed in Formula E. The team made its debut at the 2019 Diriyah ePrix as part of the 2019–20 season. Mercedes concluded their involvement at the end of the 2021–22 Formula E World Championship, with the team being taken over by McLaren and returning under new ownership from the 2022–23 season.

== History ==
On 24 July 2017, Mercedes announced that it would enter the FIA Formula E Championship in the 2019–20 season, and that it would leave the Deutsche Tourenwagen Masters (DTM) at the end of the 2018 season. Mercedes also announced that its new venture would be backed by the Mercedes-AMG Petronas Motorsport Formula One team.

=== 2018–19 season ===
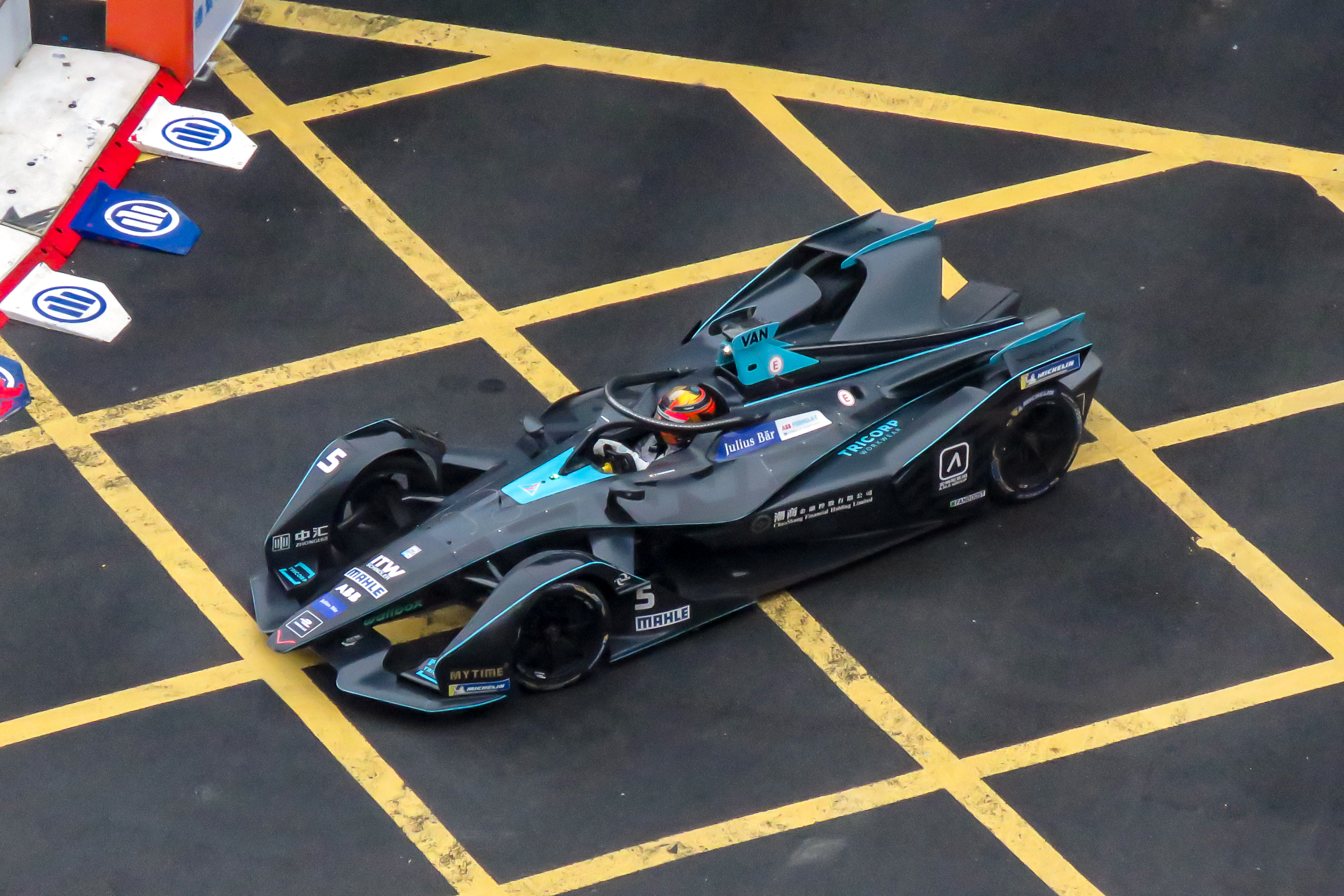
Stoffel Vandoorne qualified on pole at the 2019 Hong Kong ePrix.

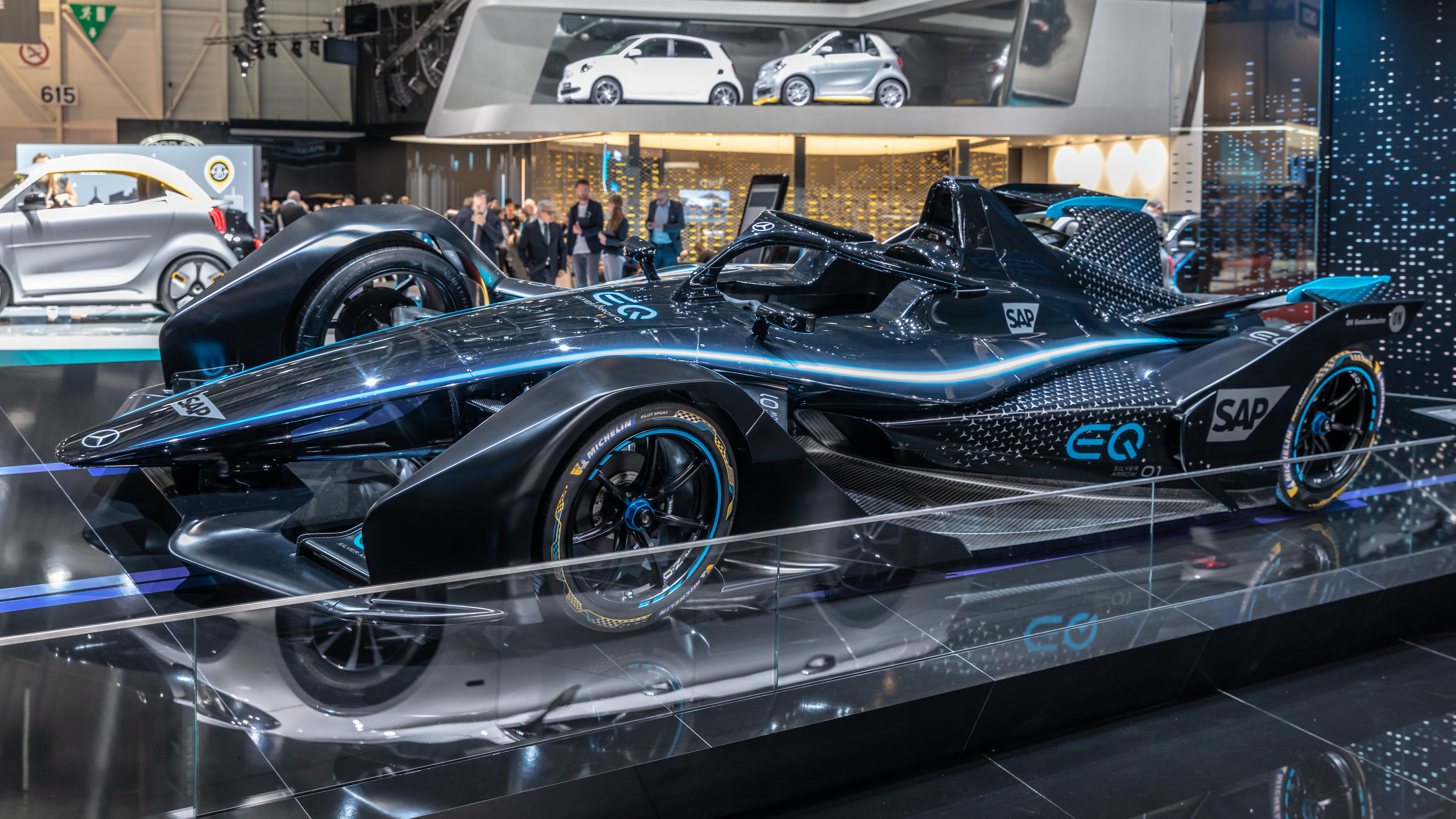
89th Geneva International Motor Show

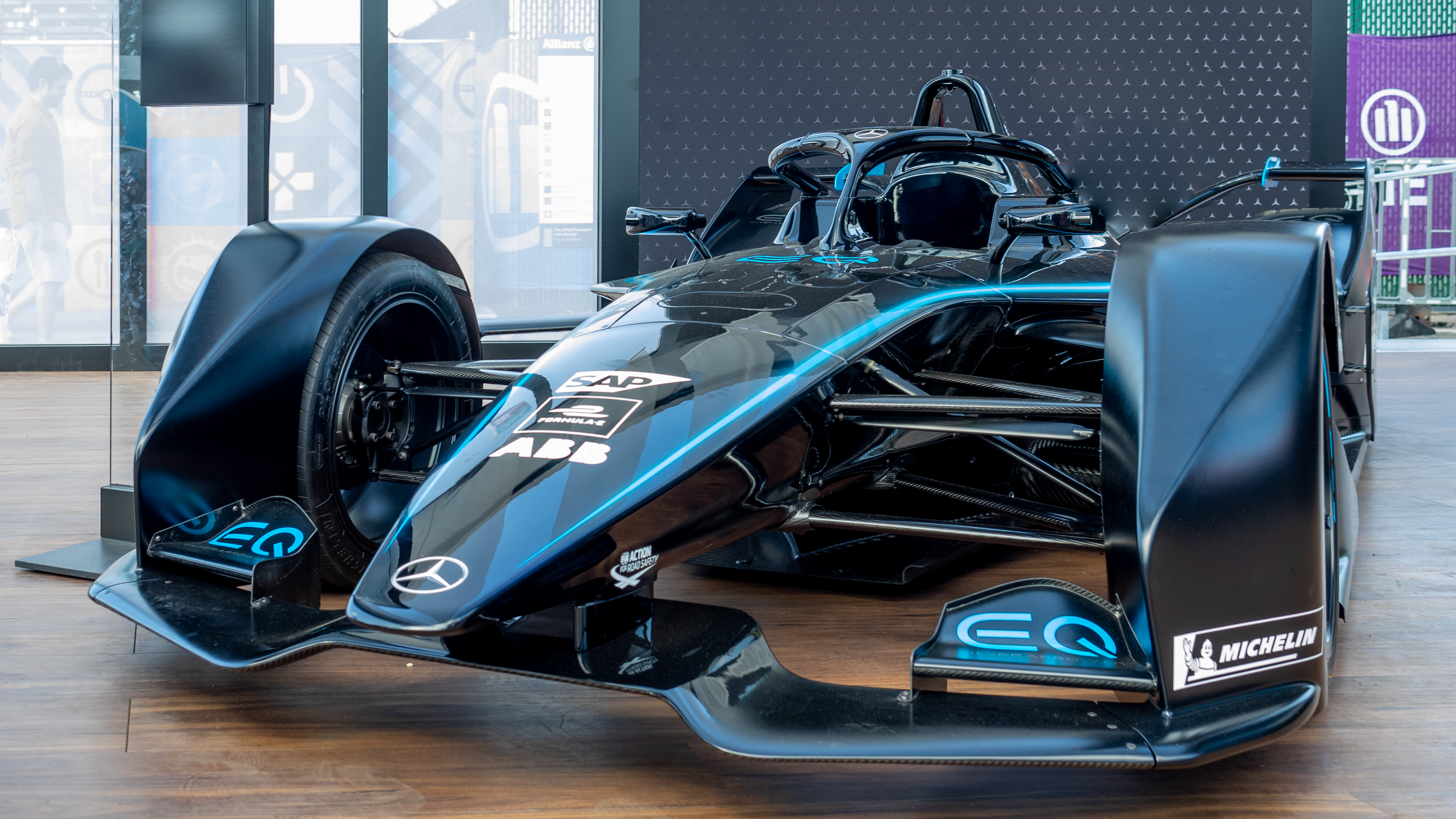
2019 New York City ePrix

Before it was officially launched, the Silver Arrow 01 had visited various promotional events during the 2018–19 season, sporting a 'teaser' black livery.

Mercedes unofficially entered Formula E a season ahead of their debut through their affiliation with HWA. On 9 May 2018, HWA confirmed that it will enter the 2018–19 season as a customer team, using powertrains from Venturi, who HWA had already been in partnership with regarding technical support. On 8 October 2018, the HWA Racelab team has been officially launched, revealing the car along with Gary Paffett as its first driver. Stoffel Vandoorne was later confirmed as Paffett's teammate, moving straight to Formula E from his McLaren F1 drive that was coming to a close.

We have always said that HWA is preparing the entry for Mercedes and we are running as an independent team. We have an independent drivetrain too, but of course we want to take away as much knowledge as we can to Brixworth, Brackley and Affalterbach. So we are trying to achieve the best for this season but mainly get the best platform to be competitive in Season Six.

— Ulrich Fritz, "HWA Racelab Building “Platform” for Mercedes EQ", e-racing365 (27 December 2018)

HWA had a very complicated start to the season, not scoring any points in its first four races. In the season's fifth race in Hong Kong, HWA surprised with their pace in wet conditions during the weekend, with Vandoorne even qualifying on pole, giving HWA its first three points in the championship. Paffett qualified fourth. Vandoorne then retired from the race after a driveshaft failure, while Paffett finished eighth, which was HWA's first points finish. HWA then scored another points and first podium in Rome, where Vandoorne finished third. The car broke down immediately after the race due to another driveshaft failure. Venturi's reliability improved in the second half of the season, giving HWA a better chance at good results. Vandoorne was a regular points scorer, but the car wasn't quick enough in races to compete for podiums.

HWA finished ninth in the Teams' Championship and scored 44 points in their one-off season (35 with Vandoorne, 9 with Paffett).

=== 2019–20 season ===
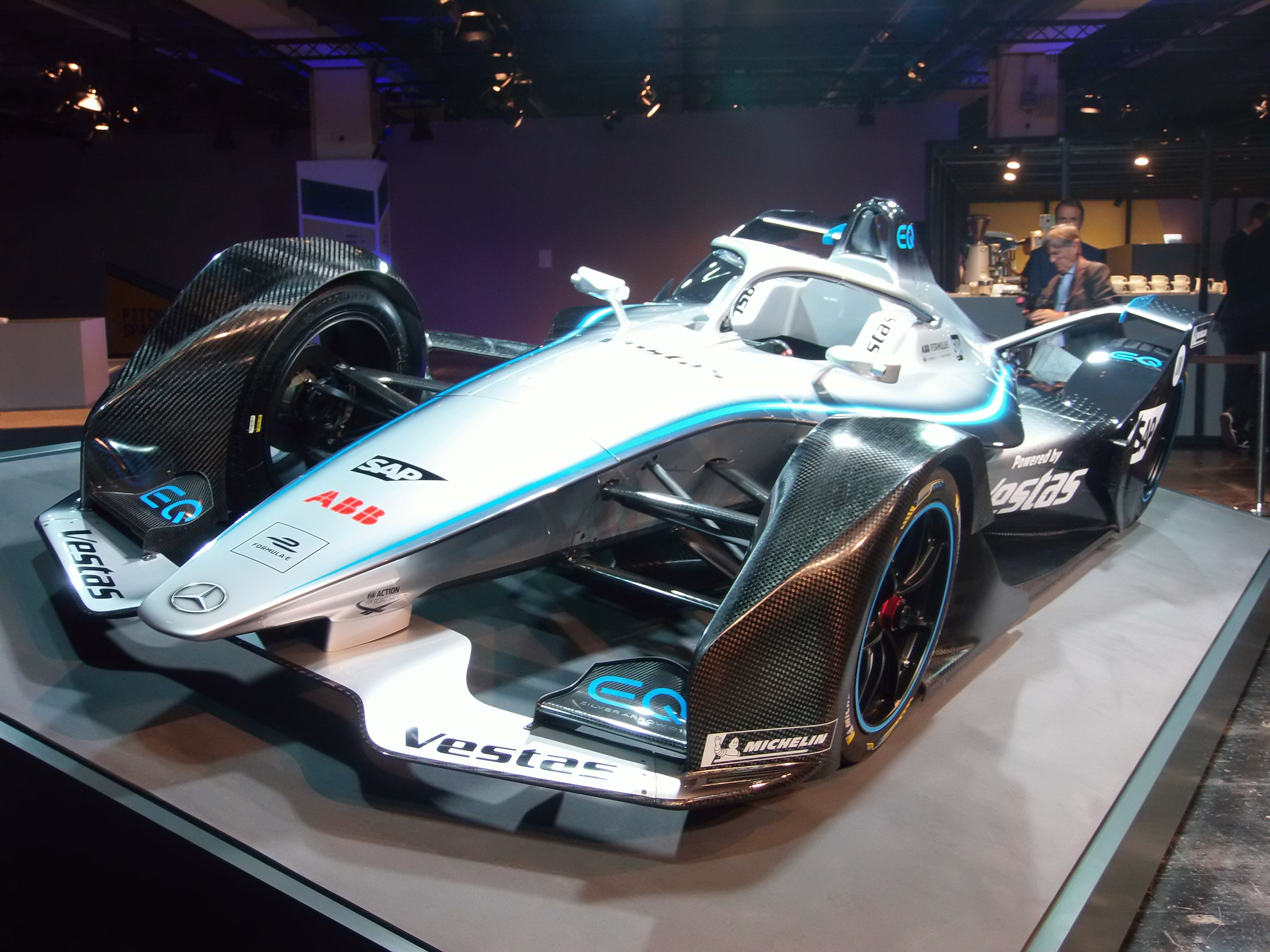
Much like Mercedes' 2020 Formula One car, the Silver Arrow 01 (pictured at IAA 2019) originally sported a silver livery before it was changed to black. Mercedes then brought back this color scheme with the Silver Arrow 02 car.

Mercedes' official debut, under the name of Mercedes-Benz EQ Formula E Team, took place in November 2019 at the Diriyah ePrix, which is a double-header event. In a form of continuity, the team will utilize the groundwork laid by HWA, rather than completely reworking the team structure. In addition to the established pairing of Paffett and Vandoorne, the team has also used Edoardo Mortara, Esteban Gutiérrez and Nyck de Vries in pre-season testing.

Mercedes' first contender, dubbed the Mercedes-Benz EQ Silver Arrow 01, was unveiled in March 2019. It featured a 'teaser' black livery, resembling the HWA car already in competition. The car went on to appear at various events, in promotion of Mercedes' Formula E entry, including the 89th Geneva International Motor Show. In September 2019, the team announced it had signed Danish wind power company Vestas as a principal partner. On 11 September, Mercedes revealed the definitive look of their car (now incorporating metallic silver), along with their new team principal and drivers. Stoffel Vandoorne will continue with team, becoming their 1st driver, but he will be partnering with the 2019 FIA Formula 2 Champion Nyck de Vries. The team will be managed by Ian James. In October, it was announced that the team will supply its new powertrain to Venturi Racing, reversing the manufacturer-customer relationship in the favor of Mercedes.

In pre-season testing, which was held at Circuit Ricardo Tormo, Mercedes were the second slowest team in overall classification, only outpacing NIO 333. Vandoorne, however, won one of the two simulation races that were held during the week. Felipe Massa from Venturi was the fastest Mercedes-powered driver of the week, finishing twelfth in the overall classification. On 15 November, the team confirmed Gutiérrez to join Paffett as a second reserve and development driver.

In July 2020, prior the season resuming after the COVID-19 pandemic, Mercedes brought back and updated the pre-season black livery to unify it with the design used on the F1 W11 EQ Performance car. The drivers also wore black racing overalls.

The team completed the 2019–20 season with their maiden victory in the final race at Berlin with a one-two finish (Vandoorne won the race and De Vries got his first podium in second). Vandoorne finished the season ranking second in the Drivers' Championship, while Mercedes finished third in the Teams' Championship.

=== 2020–21 season ===
On 29 October 2020, Mercedes revealed the new Silver Arrow 02 car, which returned to the traditional silver livery. Vandoorne and de Vries were confirmed as the driver lineup on the same occasion. The development testing was handled in conjunction with Venturi Racing, who enter their second year as a Mercedes customer team. In 2021, the team underwent a slight rebrand, now going by the name Mercedes-EQ Formula E Team. At the 2021 Diriyah ePrix, De Vries took his first Formula E win and the second win for Mercedes. Three races later, at the 2021 Rome ePrix, Stoffel Vandoorne took his second Formula E victory. On 15 August, it was reported that Mercedes would quit the championship after the 2021–22 season.

=== 2021–22 season ===
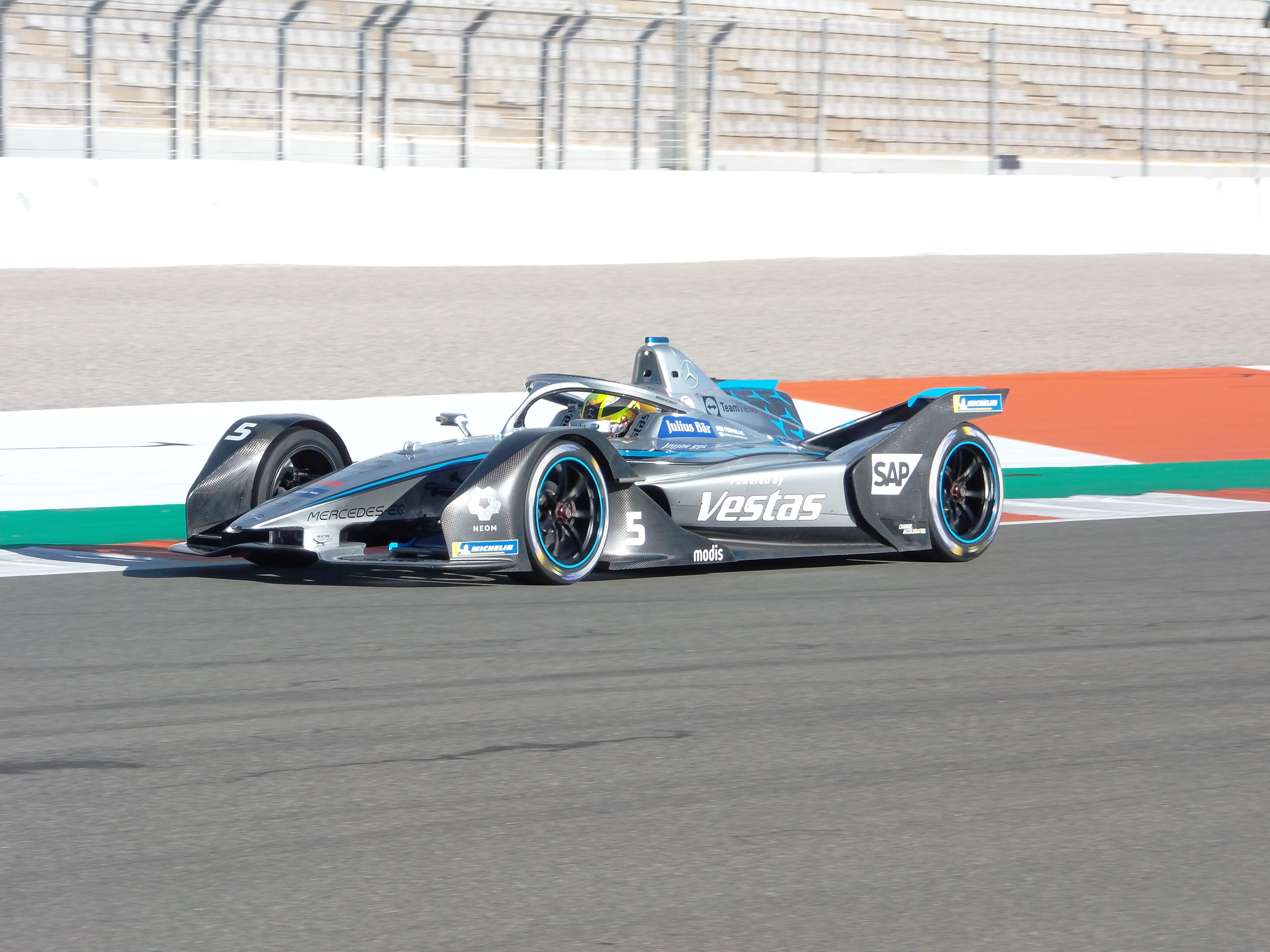
World Champion Vandoorne testing ahead of the 2021-2022 season in Valencia

For their final season in Formula E, Mercedes-EQ retained Vandoorne and De Vries as their drivers. They would win the opening ePrix in Diriyah, with De Vries 1st and Vandoorne 2nd. Vandoorne would go on to win the Monaco ePrix. In Berlin, De Vries won race 2 whilst Vandoorne collected 3rd place in both races.

After securing consistent points throughout the remaining rounds, and suffering no retirements during the entire season, Stoffel Vandoorne would win the 2021-22 Formula E World Championship, finishing 33 points ahead of Mitch Evans' Jaguar. Mercedes-EQ Formula E Team were also crowned 2021-22 Teams Champion.

=== Sponsors ===
Sponsor (Note: This list only includes companies whose logos have appeared on the team's cars. Mandatory logos of series' partners are also excluded from the list.)	2019–20	2020–21	2021–22
Vestas	Yes	Yes	Yes
SAP SE	Yes	Yes	Yes
ON Semiconductor	Yes	Yes	No
Neom	Yes	Yes	Yes
Modis	No	Yes	Yes
TeamViewer	No	Yes	Yes
Kroll	No	No	Yes

Past logos
2019–2021

== Results ==
2018–19: HWA Racelab
Year	Chassis	Powertrain	Tyres	No.	Drivers	1	2	3	4	5	6	7	8	9	10	11	12	13	14	15	16	Points	T.C.
Mercedes-Benz EQ Formula E Team
2019–20	Spark SRT05e	Mercedes-Benz EQ Silver Arrow 01	M			DIR		SCL	MEX	MRK	BER		BER		BER							147	3rd
2019–20	Spark SRT05e	Mercedes-Benz EQ Silver Arrow 01	M	5	(Belgium) Stoffel Vandoorne	3	3	6	NC	15	6	5	Ret	12	9	**1**						147	3rd
2019–20	Spark SRT05e	Mercedes-Benz EQ Silver Arrow 01	M	17	(Netherlands) Nyck de Vries	6	16	5	Ret	11	4	Ret	18	4	14	2						147	3rd
Mercedes-EQ Formula E Team
2020–21	Spark SRT05e	Mercedes-EQ Silver Arrow 02	M			DIR		RME		VLC		MCO	PUE		NYC		LDN		BER	BER		181	1st
2020–21	Spark SRT05e	Mercedes-EQ Silver Arrow 02	M	5	(Belgium) Stoffel Vandoorne	8	13	**Ret**	1	3	Ret	Ret	7	13	Ret	12	7	**15**	12	**3**		181	1st
2020–21	Spark SRT05e	Mercedes-EQ Silver Arrow 02	M	17	(Netherlands) Nyck de Vries	**1**^{G}	9	Ret	Ret	1	16	Ret	9	Ret	13	18	2	2	22	8		181	1st
2021–22	Spark SRT05e	Mercedes-EQ Silver Arrow 02	M			DIR		MEX	RME		MCO	BER		JAK	MRK	NYC		LON		SEO		319	1st
2021–22	Spark SRT05e	Mercedes-EQ Silver Arrow 02	M	5	(Belgium) Stoffel Vandoorne	2	7	11	3	5	1	3	3	5	8	4	2	2	4	5	2	319	1st
2021–22	Spark SRT05e	Mercedes-EQ Silver Arrow 02	M	17	(Netherlands) Nyck de Vries	1	**10**	6	Ret	14	10	10	1	Ret	6	8	7	6	3	Ret	Ret	319	1st
2022–23: NEOM McLaren Formula E Team

Notes

- Result in bold – Driver got pole position
- Result in italics – Driver got fastest lap
- ^{G} – Driver was fastest in group qualifying stage and was given one championship point.
- † – Driver did not finish the race, but was classified as he completed over 90% of the race distance.

=== Other teams supplied by Mercedes ===
Year	Team	Chassis	Powertrain	Tyres	No.	Drivers	Points	T.C.	Source
2019–20	(Monaco) ROKiT Venturi Racing	Spark SRT05e	Mercedes-Benz EQ Silver Arrow 01	M	No.	Drivers	44	10th	
2019–20	(Monaco) ROKiT Venturi Racing	Spark SRT05e	Mercedes-Benz EQ Silver Arrow 01	M	19	(Brazil) Felipe Massa	44	10th	
2019–20	(Monaco) ROKiT Venturi Racing	Spark SRT05e	Mercedes-Benz EQ Silver Arrow 01	M	48	(Switzerland) Edoardo Mortara	44	10th	
2020–21	(Monaco) ROKiT Venturi Racing	Spark SRT05e	Mercedes-EQ Silver Arrow 02	M	48	(Switzerland) Edoardo Mortara	146	7th	
2020–21	(Monaco) ROKiT Venturi Racing	Spark SRT05e	Mercedes-EQ Silver Arrow 02	M	71	(France) Norman Nato	146	7th	
2021–22	(Monaco) ROKiT Venturi Racing	Spark SRT05e	Mercedes-EQ Silver Arrow 02	M	11	(Brazil) Lucas di Grassi	295	2nd	
2021–22	(Monaco) ROKiT Venturi Racing	Spark SRT05e	Mercedes-EQ Silver Arrow 02	M	48	(Switzerland) Edoardo Mortara	295	2nd	
