= Riyadh Street Circuit =

Former street circuit in Saudi Arabia

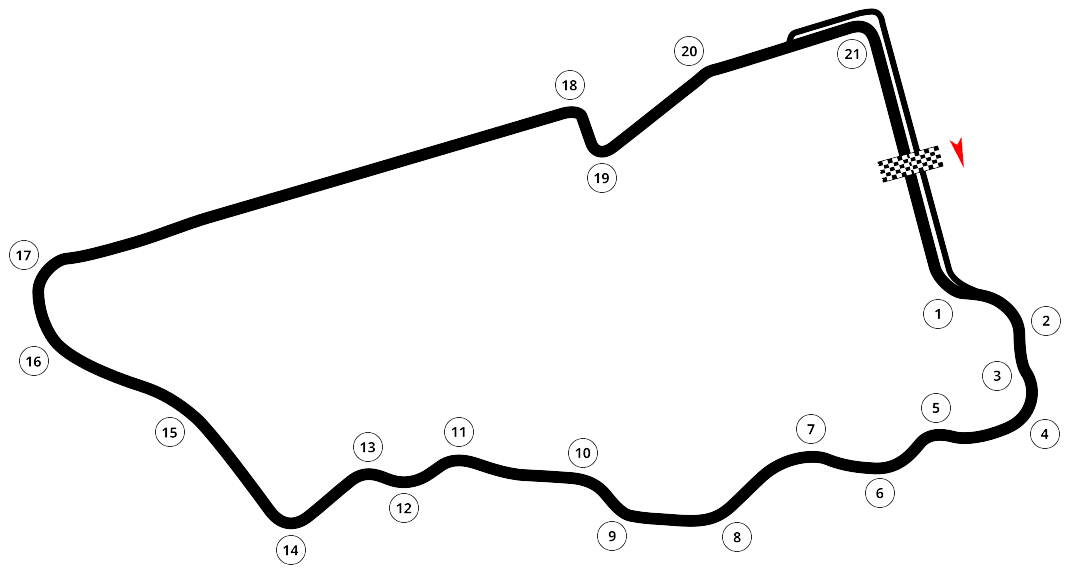
- Formula E Circuit (2018–2024)
- Location: Diriyah, Saudi Arabia
- Coordinates: 24°44′19″N 46°35′02″E
- FIA Grade: 3E
- Opened: 15 December 2018; 7 years ago
- Closed: 27 January 2024; 2 years ago
- Major events: Former: Formula E Diriyah ePrix (2018–2019, 2021–2024); Jaguar I-Pace eTrophy (2018–2019)

Formula E Circuit (2018–2024)
- Length: 2.495 km (1.550 mi)
- Turns: 21
- Race lap record: 1:08.723 ( (United Kingdom) Sam Bird, Jaguar I-Type 5, 2022, F-E)

The Riyadh Street Circuit was a street circuit located in the capital of Saudi Arabia, used for the Diriyah ePrix of the FIA Formula E Championship. It held its first race on 15 December 2018, as the opening race of the 2018-19 FIA Formula E Championship.

== History ==
In May 2018, ahead of the 2018 Berlin ePrix, it was announced that Formula E holdings had signed a deal with the Saudi Arabian government, for a race to be held in the outskirts of the Saudi Arabian capital of Riyadh, in the Ad Diriyah district for 10 years. The design was first unveiled on 25 September 2018 at the Governate of Diriyah, with the design calling for a 2.847 km (1.769 mi) long track.

== Track Layout ==
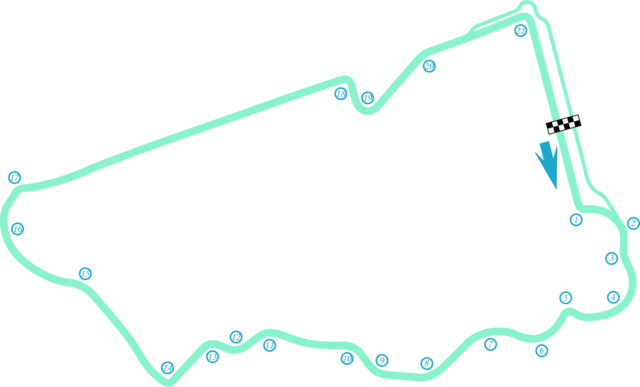
The original layout of Riyadh Street Circuit (2018–2019)

The Final track layout was shortened to 2.495 km (1.550 mi), and it features a distinctive second sector, with its tight corners being unique to the track in the Formula E Championship. Before the 2021 race, the track was revised and resurfaced with reprofiling Turn 9, 13, 18, 19; and moving the start straight before the Turn 18.

== Lap records ==
The fastest official race lap records at the Riyadh Street Circuit are listed as:

Category	Time	Driver	Vehicle	Event
Formula E Circuit (2018–2024): 2.495 km (1.550 mi)
Formula E	1:08.723	Sam Bird	Jaguar I-Type 5	2022 Diriyah ePrix
Jaguar I-Pace eTrophy	1:30.564	Sérgio Jimenez	Jaguar I-Pace eTrophy car	2019 2nd Diriyah Jaguar I-Pace eTrophy round
