= Penske Corporation =

American transportation services company

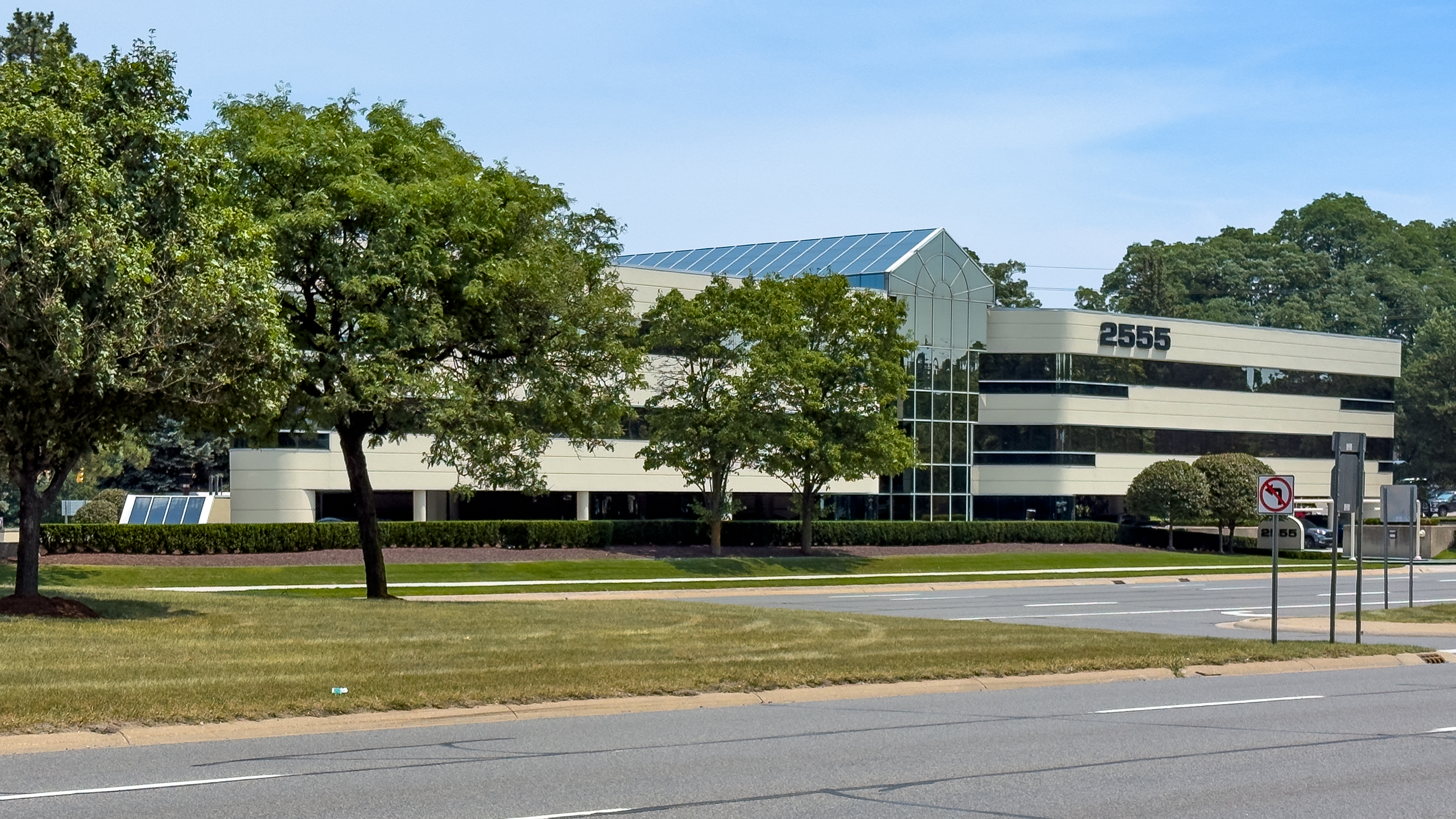
- Headquarters in Bloomfield Township, MI
- Type: Private
- Industry: Transportation
- Founded: 1969; 57 years ago
- Founder: Roger Penske
- Headquarters: Bloomfield Township, Michigan, US
- Key people: Roger Penske (Chairman); Brian Hard (President)
- Products: Auto Racing, Truck Leasing, Retail, Logistics
- Number of employees: 70,000
- Website: www.penske.com

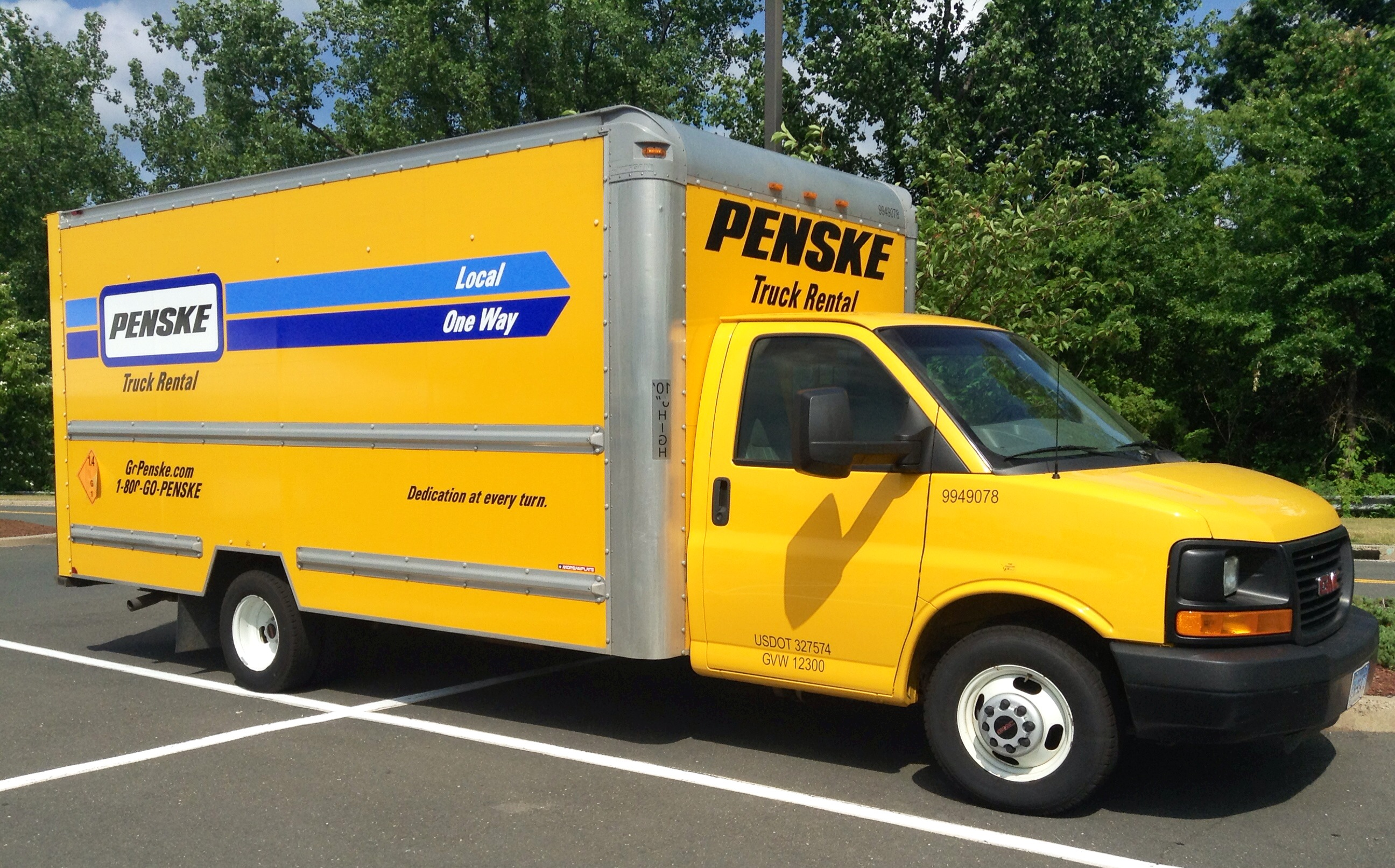
A yellow Penske truck

Penske Corporation, Inc. (/pɛn.skiː/) is an American diversified transportation services company based in Bloomfield Township, Oakland County, Michigan. Roger Penske is the founder and chairman of the privately held company, and Rob Kurnick is the president. Penske operates in the automotive retail, truck leasing, transportation, logistics, and motorsports industries. Penske operates in over 3,200 locations and employs more than 70,000 people globally.

== Holdings ==
=== Current ===
- DAVCO Technology (transportation component manufacturing)
- Ilmor Engineering (high performance motorsport engines)
- Penske Automotive Group (a 40+% stake)
  - CarShop (used vehicle dealerships in Pennsylvania and New Jersey)
  - Premier Truck Group (commercial vehicle dealerships in the United States and Canada)
  - Sytner Group (new and used vehicle dealerships in the UK)
- Penske Entertainment Corporation (67% with Fox Corporation), parent company of:
  - IndyCar (Motorsports sanctioning body; parent company of the IndyCar Series)
  - Indianapolis Motor Speedway (2.5-mile race track in Speedway, Indiana)
    - Indianapolis Motor Speedway Radio Network
  - IMS Productions (broadcast television production company with satellite trucks, TV trucks and audio/visual editing facilities)
  - Grand Prix Association of Long Beach (promoter of the Grand Prix of Long Beach in Long Beach, California)
  - Detroit Grand Prix (promoter of the Detroit Grand Prix in Detroit, Michigan)
- Penske Logistics (supply chain management and logistics service)
- Penske Motor Group (Toyota and Lexus dealerships in California and Texas)
- Penske Racing Shocks (high performance motorsport suspension)
- Penske Truck Leasing (joint venture with Penske Corp. and Mitsui & Co., Ltd)
- Penske Truck Rental (truck rental services)
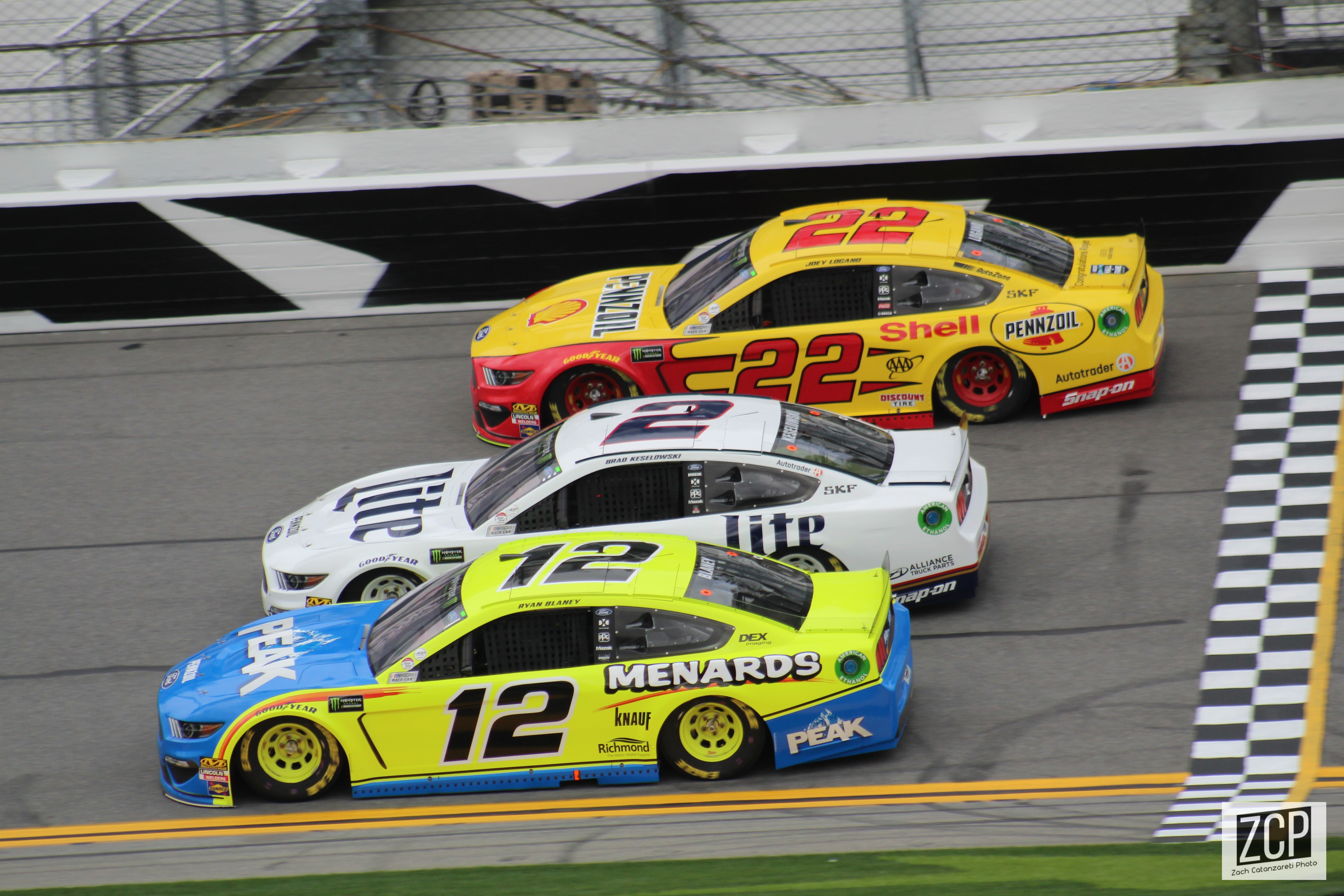
- Penske's 3 NASCAR stock cars in 2019. Top to bottom: Joey Logano, Brad Keselowski and Ryan Blaney.
  Team Penske (Motorsports team that enters teams in the IndyCar Series, IMSA SportsCar Championship, NASCAR and World Endurance Championship)

=== Former ===
- Detroit Diesel – A former GM subsidiary, Penske purchased a portion of the company in 1988 and, together with General Motors, spun the company off into a separate company. - Sold to DaimlerChrysler AG in 2000.
- DJR Team Penske (51% stake) (Australian V8 Supercars team) sold in 2020
- Penske Auto Centers – A former subsidiary that had operated auto repair centers within selected Kmart stores from 1995 until 2002.
- VM Motori – 50% was bought in 2003 and the rest in 2007, but a 51% stake was sold to Fiat S.p.A. in February 2011, and the remainder sold to Fiat in 2013.
- Truck-Lite (transportation component manufacturing) - Penske purchased the company in 1997 and sold majority share in 2015.
