= Venturi Racing =

Monegasque Formula E team

(Monaco) ROKiT Venturi Racing
- Founded: 2013
- Founder(s): Gildo Pallanca Pastor; Leonardo DiCaprio
- Folded: 2022
- Former series: Formula E
- Noted drivers: (Germany) Nick Heidfeld (France) Stéphane Sarrazin (Canada) Jacques Villeneuve (United Kingdom) Mike Conway (Germany) Maro Engel (France) Tom Dillmann (Switzerland) Edoardo Mortara (Brazil) Felipe Massa (France) Norman Nato (Brazil) Lucas di Grassi
- Races: 100
- Wins: 8
- Podiums: 21
- Poles: 2
- Fastest laps: 9
- Points: 811
- First entry: 2014 Beijing ePrix
- Last entry: 2022 Seoul ePrix
- First win: 2019 Hong Kong ePrix
- Last win: 2022 Seoul ePrix (R2)
- Website: www.venturiracing.com

Venturi Racing (formerly Venturi Formula E Team) was a Monégasque motor racing team controlled by Scott Swid (Chairman and principal owner) and José María Aznar Botella. The team competed in the FIA Formula E World Championship. Venturi Racing competed with a single-make chassis built by Spark and initially built its own powertrains, before partnering with Mercedes from the 2019–20 season. The team was renamed to Maserati MSG Racing from the 2022–23 season.

== History ==
=== 2014–15 season ===
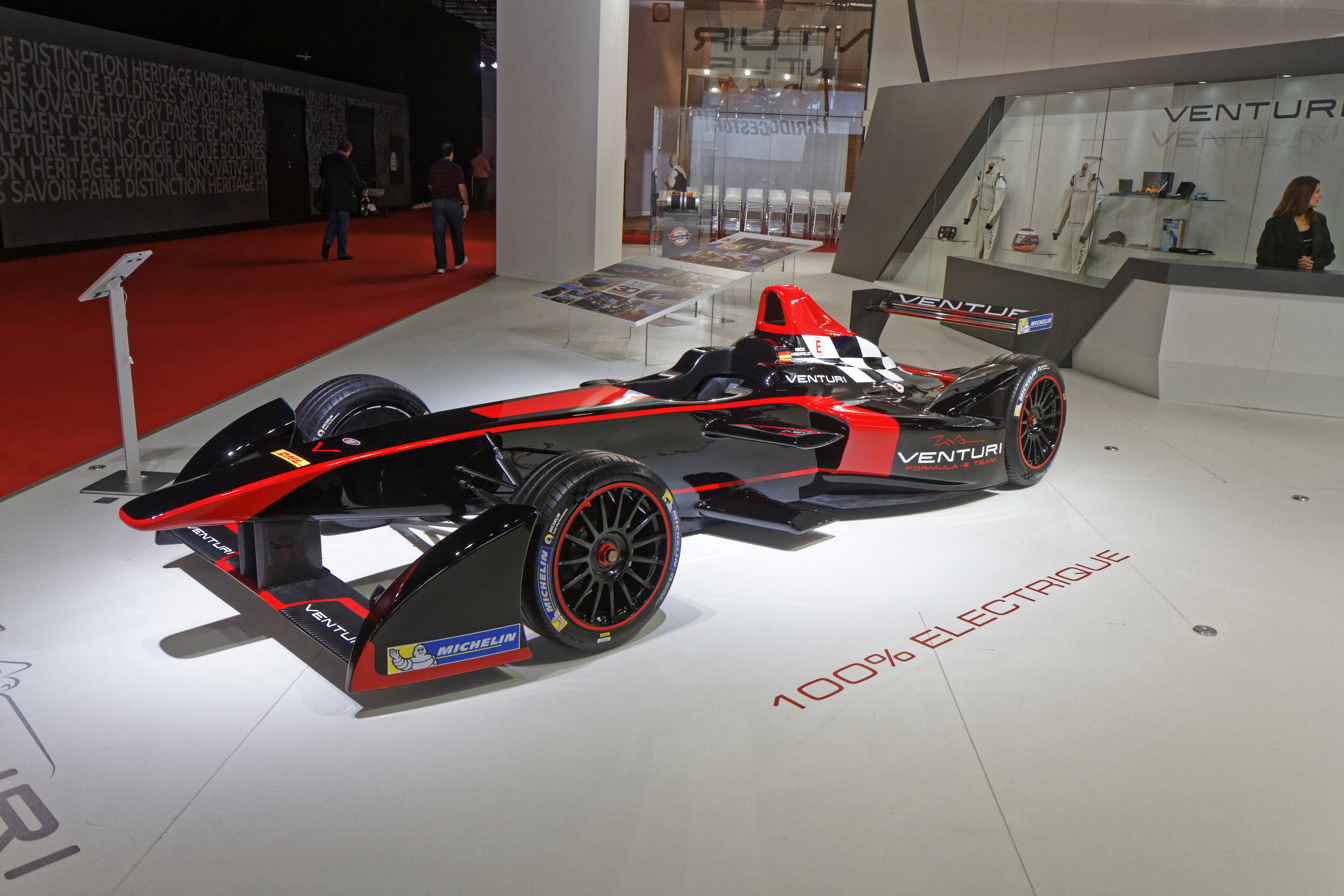
2014 Spark-Renault SRT 01E used by Venturi

Venturi was co-founded by businessman Gildo Pallanca Pastor and actor Leonardo DiCaprio, becoming one of Formula E's founding teams by committing to the championship in December 2013. For the series' inaugural season, it was announced that the team had signed Nick Heidfeld and Stéphane Sarrazin as its drivers, with Franck Baldet as team coordinator.

In Formula E's debut race at the Beijing ePrix, Heidfeld was running in second place and attempted to overtake Nicolas Prost for the lead on the final lap. In the last corner, the pair collided and both failed to finish, with the accident causing Heidfeld's car to alarmingly fly through the air and land on the roll hoop. This handed the win to Lucas di Grassi. Prost was given a 10-place grid penalty for the next round in Putrajaya.

At the Buenos Aires ePrix, Venturi was again in contention for victory with Heidfeld. With three laps to go, Heidfeld received a drive-through penalty for speeding in the pit lane. This handed António Félix da Costa his maiden Formula E victory.

Venturi took its largest points haul of the season at the Berlin ePrix. Heidfeld took the team's only podium finish of the season at the Moscow ePrix, taking third behind eventual champion Nelson Piquet Jr. and di Grassi.

Sarrazin won the final race of the season from pole position but was penalised for exceeding the maximum energy usage, dropping him to 15th. Heidfeld ended the season in 12th position in the Drivers' Championship with 31 points while Sarrazin was 14th on 22 points, leaving the team ninth in the standings. Heidfeld left the team at the end of the season to join Mahindra.

=== 2015–16 season ===
For the 2015-16 season, Venturi supplied powertrains to customer team Dragon Racing and signed 1997 Formula One World Champion Jacques Villeneuve as a teammate to Sarrazin. After the Punta del Este ePrix, however, the Canadian left after 'disagreeing on the direction of the team'. He was replaced by Mike Conway.

Sarrazin outperformed both drivers over the season, scoring points at every race and finishing second behind di Grassi in Long Beach, which was also the scene of Conway's first points finish of the season in 10th place.

Venturi finished in sixth position in the Teams’ Championship with 77 points. Sarrazin claimed 70 of these to also rank sixth in the Drivers’ Standings while Conway claimed the remaining seven points to rank 16th. Villeneuve ranked 20th with zero points.

With a run of 10 points-scoring races, Sarrazin became the first driver in Formula E to record points at every round in one season.

=== 2016–17 season ===
Sarrazin was retained for a third consecutive season by Venturi and was partnered by FIA GT World Cup driver Maro Engel who replaced Conway at the team.

Venturi commenced the campaign with a double points finish at the 2016 Hong Kong ePrix, however, an uncompetitive car resulted in a difficult season. The team's best result came in Monaco, where Engel recorded fifth position.

For the 2017 Paris ePrix, Formula V8 3.5 Series champion Tom Dillmann filled in for Engel who was racing in the 2017 Deutsche Tourenwagen Masters round at the EuroSpeedway Lausitz. One race later in Berlin, Dillmann replaced Sarrazin who moved to Techeetah to replace Esteban Gutiérrez for the final six races.

Venturi recorded 30 points to finish ninth in the Teams’ Championship. Engel recorded 16 of these points to take 17th in the Drivers’ Standings while Dillmann recorded 12 for 19th and Sarrazin, 2.

=== 2017–18 season ===
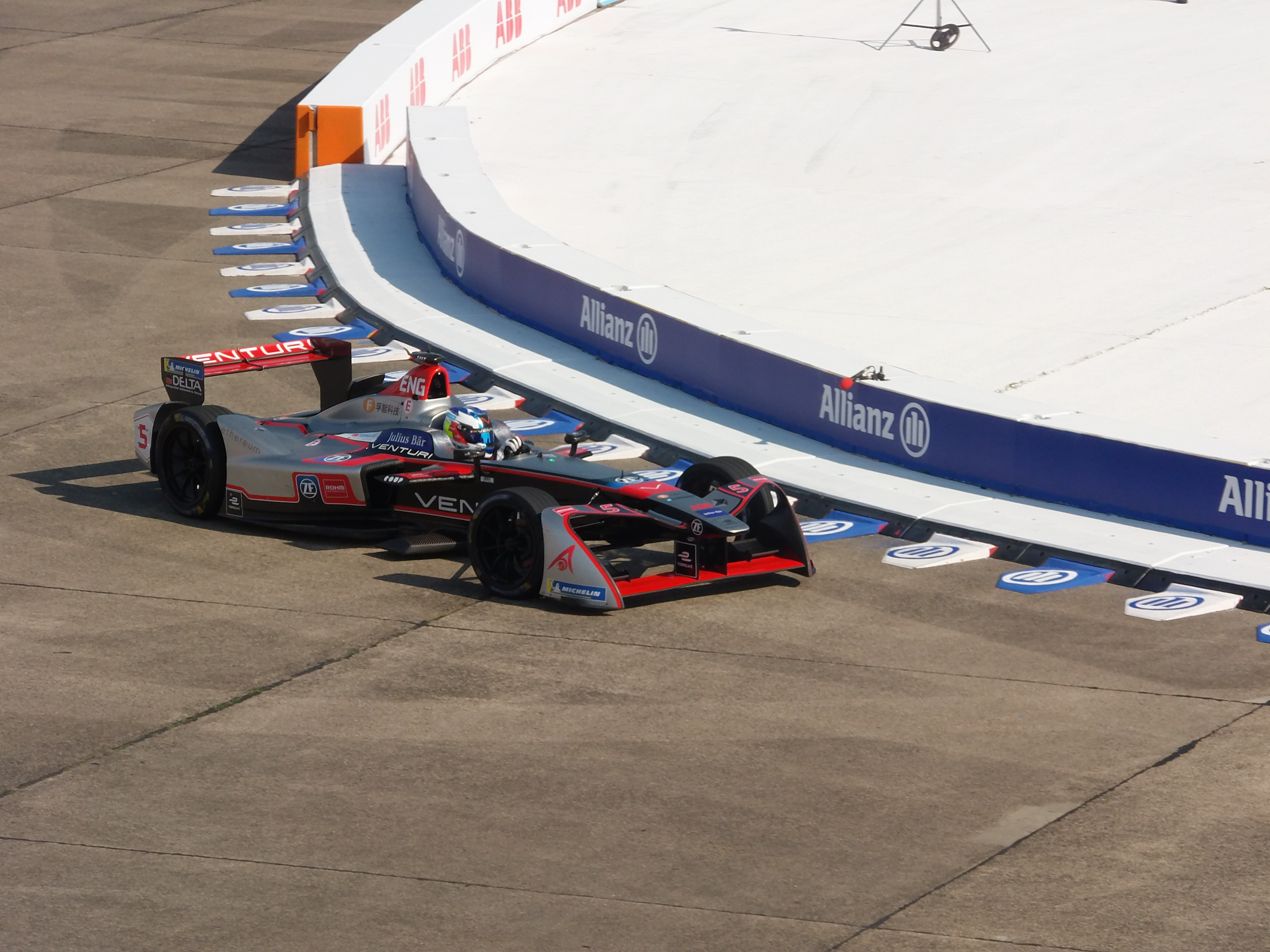
Maro Engel driving for Venturi at the 2018 Berlin E-Prix

For the fourth season of Formula E, Venturi re-signed Engel and hired seven time Macau World Cup winner Edoardo Mortara.

On his debut weekend in Formula E in Hong Kong, Mortara claimed the team's first podium since the 2016 Long Beach ePrix. The Swiss-Italian driver led for most of the race, however, span out of first position with three laps to go when trying to set the fastest lap. Mortara finished third but was promoted to second following the disqualification of race winner Daniel Abt.

Due to commitments in the DTM championship with Mercedes, Dillmann filled in for Mortara at the Berlin and New York City races.

Mortara's podium in the season-opener marked Venturi's highest finish in Formula E's fourth season in which the team recorded 72 points to rank seventh in the Teams’ Championship. Engel finished 12th in the Drivers’ Standings with 31 points while Mortara was 13th with 29. Dillmann notched 12 points in his three race appearances to finish 18th.

=== 2018–19 season ===
In May 2018, Venturi signed a three-year deal with 11-time Formula One race winner Felipe Massa and rehired Mortara for a second season. Norman Nato was named as the team's Reserve Driver. Former professional racing driver Susie Wolff became the Team Principal while Franck Baldet became Technical Director.

Venturi supplied powertrains to the Mercedes-affiliated HWA Racelab team over the 2018–19 season, with the outfit preparing for the official entry of the Mercedes-Benz EQ Formula E Team in the 2019-20 season.

At Formula E's landmark 50th race at the 2019 Hong Kong ePrix, Mortara recorded Venturi's maiden victory.

Venturi took further podiums at the Mexico City E-Prix and Monaco E-Prix which was also the site of Massa's first podium finish in Formula E. With 88 points, the team took eighth in the championship. Mortara finished 14th in the Drivers’ Standings with 52 points while Massa was 15th with 36 points.

=== 2019–20 season ===
In October 2019, Venturi confirmed that Mortara would again partner Massa while the team entered a powertrain partnership with Mercedes-Benz.

On the eve of the 2019-20 season opener, the team announced a three-year title sponsorship with telecommunications company ROKiT, and also confirmed the retention of Norman Nato as reserve driver and the appointment of Arthur Leclerc, brother of Ferrari Formula One driver Charles Leclerc, as test driver.

The team recorded five consecutive points finishes in the first five races, prior to the season's five-month suspension as a result of the COVID-19 pandemic.

After the season resumed in August with six races at the Tempelhof Airport Street Circuit in Berlin, Mortara took 14th in the Drivers' Championship with 41 points while Massa was 22nd with 3 points. Venturi finished in 10th in the Teams' Standings with 44 points. At the final race of the season, it was announced that Massa would be retiring from Formula E.

=== 2020–21 season ===
For Formula E's seventh season and first as a World Championship, Venturi re-signed Mortara and promoted Norman Nato to a full-time race seat, with the Frenchman replacing Massa. Jake Hughes, in turn, joined the team as Reserve Driver while Jérôme d'Ambrosio was appointed as Deputy Team Principal after deciding to retire from professional competition at the end of Season 6.

In December 2020, Venturi announced a take over in ownership, with a US investor group led by Scott Swid and Jose M Aznar Botella purchasing the team. Susie Wolff remained as Team Principal and retained an interest in Venturi alongside Founder Gildo Pallanca Pastor.

Mortara commenced the season with a podium at the 2021 Diriyah ePrix in which he secured second place behind Nyck de Vries. One day later, the Swiss-Italian driver was involved in a high-speed frontal collision during practice for Race 2 when an incorrect software parameter caused a brake failure. Although Mortara was released from hospital, he did not take part in the second leg of the season opener.

Mortara returned to the cockpit one race later in Rome and scored a further three podiums over the remainder of the season, including a second career victory at the inaugural Puebla ePrix – Venturi’s first win since the Season 5 Hong Kong ePrix, 834 days earlier.

Amassing 92 points, Mortara was a key championship protagonist in the season’s finale in Berlin, however, was removed from contention following a collision with Mitch Evans on the opening lap of the final race of the year in which he sustained a microfracture of his fourth vertebra.

Mercedes’ de Vries went on to win the Season 7 championship while Mortara became Formula E’s first vice-World Champion by claiming second place in the Drivers’ Standings.

In his rookie campaign, Nato steadily improved and won the final race of the season in Berlin, standing on the Formula E podium for the first time after being stripped of a second and third-placed finish in Valencia and Rome. With this result, and outside of Formula E's inaugural campaign, Nato became only the third driver to win a race in their rookie season. The Frenchman ended the season as Venturi’s most successful rookie on record, amassing 54 points and finishing 18th in the Drivers’ Championship.

Venturi finished in seventh position in the Teams’ Standings with 146 points, completing its most successful season in Formula E to date in terms of points scored.

=== 2021–22 season ===
In September 2021, Venturi re-signed Mortara for a fifth successive season while Season 3 champion Lucas di Grassi joined the team, replacing Nato who, in turn, joined Jaguar Racing as Reserve Driver. Susie Wolff, meanwhile, was promoted to the position of CEO while Jérôme D'Ambrosio took over as Team Principal.

In Race Two of the 2022 Diriyah ePrix, Venturi scored its first double podium in Formula E, with Mortara taking his third victory while di Grassi secured his first podium for the team. Mortara later secured his first Formula E pole position at the 2022 Berlin ePrix – a result that marked Venturi Racing's first pole position since the 2015 London ePrix, 2,512 days earlier.

Mortara went on to win Race 1 in Berlin to commence a four-race podium run, taking second in Race 2 in Berlin, third in Jakarta and winning in Marrakesh. This stint ended in New York, although di Grassi returned to the podium by finishing third in Race 1. Di Grassi secured his 13th Formula E win at the 2022 London ePrix one weekend later.

Di Grassi became the first driver in Formula E to score his 1,000th point in the series in Race One of the 2022 Seoul ePrix. Mortara secured his fourth win of the season in the final race, which also marked Formula E's landmark 100th race.

As a result, Venturi completed its most successful season to date, amassing 295 points to finish second in the World Teams' Championship behind Mercedes-EQ. Mortara finished third in the World Drivers' Championship with 169 points while di Grassi was fifth with 129 points.

At the close of the season, Venturi confirmed the departure of Wolff and D'Ambrosio from its senior management team, ahead of its transition to Maserati MSG Racing in Season 9.

=== Partners ===
Sponsor (Note: This list only includes companies whose logos have appeared on the team's cars. Mandatory logos of series' partners are also excluded from the list.)	2014–15	2015–16	2016–17	2017–18	2018–19	2019–20	2020–21	2021–22
ROKiT (Note: Including various ROKiT Group subsidiaries in ROKiT Cities (2019–present), Bandero (2019–20) and ABK Beer (2019–20).)	No	No	No	No	No	Yes T	Yes T	Yes T
Prince Albert II of Monaco Foundation	Yes	Yes	Yes	Yes	Yes	Yes	No	No
Brasserie de Monaco	Yes	Yes	No	No	No	No	No	No
SMEG	Yes	No	No	No	No	No	No	No
Ars Technica	Yes	No	No	No	No	No	No	No
Mario Bertulli	No	Yes	Yes	No	No	No	No	No
ROHM Semiconductor	No	Yes	Yes	Yes	Yes	No	No	No
Pix Associates	No	Yes	No	No	No	No	No	No
Monster Energy	No	Yes	No	No	No	No	No	No
ZF Friedrichshafen	No	No	Yes	Yes	Yes	No	No	No
DELTA	No	No	Yes	Yes	No	No	No	No
Farasis Energy	No	No	Yes	Yes	Yes	Yes	No	No
Andbank	No	No	No	Yes	No	No	No	No
Ethereum	No	No	No	Yes	No	No	No	No
COUP Mobility	No	No	No	Yes	No	No	No	No
Hewlett Packard Enterprise	No	No	No	No	Yes	Yes	Yes	Yes
Becker Carbon	No	No	No	No	Yes	No	No	No
Richard Mille	No	No	No	No	Yes	Yes	Yes	No
Julius Baer Group	No	No	No	No	Yes	Yes	Yes	Yes
Acronis	No	No	No	No	Yes	Yes	Yes	No
Ecoalf	No	No	No	No	No	No	Yes	Yes
Dorchester Collection	No	No	No	No	No	No	Yes	Yes
New Era Cap Company	No	No	No	No	No	No	No	Yes
Lukka	No	No	No	No	No	No	No	Yes
elit Vodka	No	No	No	No	No	No	No	Yes
Craft 1861	No	No	No	No	No	No	No	Yes

== Next Gen Programme ==
In March 2018, Venturi became the first Formula E team to establish a junior programme. There were eight drivers in the programme:

Driver	Series	Titles
(France) Dorian Boccolacci	Porsche Supercup	French F4 Junior Champion (2014)
(France) Pierre-Louis Chovet	Formula Regional Asian Championship	n/a
(Monaco) Arthur Leclerc	FIA Formula 3 Championship	Formula Regional Asian Championship Champion (2022)
(France) Benjamin Cartery	Karting	n/a
(France) Louis Iglesias	Karting	n/a
(France) Gaëtan Goarant	E-Sport World Championship	E-Sport World Championship
(France) Kevin Leaune	E-Sport World Championship	E-Sport World Championship
(France) Maxime Pain	E-Sport World Championship	E-Sport World Championship

== Results ==
Year	Chassis	Powertrain	Tyres	No.	Drivers	1	2	3	4	5	6	7	8	9	10	11	12	13	14	15	16	Points	T.C.
Venturi Formula E Team
2014–15	Spark SRT01-e	SRT01-e^{1}	M			BEI	PUT	PDE	BUE	MIA	LBH	MCO	BER	MSC	LDN							53	9th
2014–15	Spark SRT01-e	SRT01-e^{1}	M	23	(Germany) Nick Heidfeld	13†	DSQ	10	8	12	11	10	5	3	13	Ret						53	9th
2014–15	Spark SRT01-e	SRT01-e^{1}	M	30	(France) Stéphane Sarrazin	9	12	Ret	10	Ret	10	7	6	14	10	15						53	9th
2015–16	Spark SRT01-e	Venturi VM200-FE-01	M			BEI	PUT	PDE	BUE	MEX	LBH	PAR	BER	LDN								77	6th
2015–16	Spark SRT01-e	Venturi VM200-FE-01	M	4	(France) Stéphane Sarrazin	9	4	9	4	9	2	5	10	10	5							77	6th
2015–16	Spark SRT01-e	Venturi VM200-FE-01	M	12	(Canada) Jacques Villeneuve	14	11	DNS														77	6th
2015–16	Spark SRT01-e	Venturi VM200-FE-01	M	12	(United Kingdom) Mike Conway				15	12	10	14	8	9	13							77	6th
2016–17	Spark SRT01-e	Venturi VM200-FE-02	M			HKG	MRK	BUE	MEX	MCO	PAR	BER		NYC		MTL						30	9th
2016–17	Spark SRT01-e	Venturi VM200-FE-02	M	4	(France) Stéphane Sarrazin	10	12	12	15	15	10											30	9th
2016–17	Spark SRT01-e	Venturi VM200-FE-02	M	4	(France) Tom Dillmann							18	15	13	7	10	10					30	9th
2016–17	Spark SRT01-e	Venturi VM200-FE-02	M	5	(Germany) Maro Engel	9	Ret	Ret	Ret	5		9	Ret	Ret	Ret	12	18					30	9th
2016–17	Spark SRT01-e	Venturi VM200-FE-02	M	5	(France) Tom Dillmann						8											30	9th
2017–18	Spark SRT01-e	Venturi VM200-FE-03	M			HKG		MRK	SCL	MEX	PDE	RME	PAR	BER	ZUR	NYC						72	7th
2017–18	Spark SRT01-e	Venturi VM200-FE-03	M	4	(Switzerland) Edoardo Mortara	7	2	17†	13	8	17	10	13		Ret							72	7th
2017–18	Spark SRT01-e	Venturi VM200-FE-03	M	4	(France) Tom Dillmann									13		4	Ret					72	7th
2017–18	Spark SRT01-e	Venturi VM200-FE-03	M	5	(Germany) Maro Engel	13	7	12	Ret	16	10	8	4	8	11	8	Ret					72	7th
2018–19	Spark SRT05e	Venturi VFE05	M			ADR	MRK	SCL	MEX	HKG	SYX	RME	PAR	MCO	BER	BRN	NYC					88	8th
2018–19	Spark SRT05e	Venturi VFE05	M	19	(Brazil) Felipe Massa	17	18	Ret	8	5	10	Ret	9	3	15	8	16†	15				88	8th
2018–19	Spark SRT05e	Venturi VFE05	M	48	(Switzerland) Edoardo Mortara	19	13	4	3	1	13	Ret	Ret	Ret	11	Ret	Ret	Ret				88	8th
ROKiT Venturi Racing
2019–20	Spark SRT05e	Mercedes-Benz EQ Silver Arrow 01	M			DIR		SCL	MEX	MRK	BER		BER		BER							44	10th
2019–20	Spark SRT05e	Mercedes-Benz EQ Silver Arrow 01	M	19	(Brazil) Felipe Massa	12	17	9	Ret	17	Ret	Ret	19	10	13	16						44	10th
2019–20	Spark SRT05e	Mercedes-Benz EQ Silver Arrow 01	M	48	(Switzerland) Edoardo Mortara	7	4	Ret	8	5	17	8	14	14	8	10						44	10th
2020–21	Spark SRT05e	Mercedes-EQ Silver Arrow 02	M			DIR		RME		VLC		MCO	MEX		NYC		LDN		BER	BER		146	7th
2020–21	Spark SRT05e	Mercedes-EQ Silver Arrow 02	M	48	(Switzerland) Edoardo Mortara	2	DNS	Ret	4	Ret	9	12	3	1	14	17	9	11	2	Ret		146	7th
2020–21	Spark SRT05e	Mercedes-EQ Silver Arrow 02	M	71	(France) Norman Nato	14	16	11	DSQ^{G}	NC	5	13	14	Ret	15	7	NC	Ret	4	1		146	7th
2021–22	Spark SRT05e	Mercedes-EQ Silver Arrow 02	M			DIR		MEX	RME		MCO	BER		JAK	MRK	NYC		LON		SEO		295	2nd
2021–22	Spark SRT05e	Mercedes-EQ Silver Arrow 02	M	11	(Brazil) Lucas di Grassi	5	3	12	11	8	6	21†	4	7	5	2	Ret	9	1	3	11	295	2nd
2021–22	Spark SRT05e	Mercedes-EQ Silver Arrow 02	M	48	(Switzerland) Edoardo Mortara	6	1	5	7	Ret	Ret	1	2^{FP}	3	1	9	10	18	13	Ret	1	295	2nd
2022–23: Maserati MSG Racing

Notes

- ^1 – In the inaugural season, all teams were supplied with a spec powertrain by McLaren.
- ^{G} – Driver was fastest in group qualifying stage and was given one championship point.
- † – Driver did not finish the race, but was classified as he completed over 90% of the race distance.
- ^{P}– Marks the driver who was given three points for being starting on Pole.
- ^{F}– Marks the driver who was given one point for fastest lap.

=== Other teams supplied by Venturi ===
Year	Team	Chassis	Powertrain	Tyres	No.	Drivers	Points	T.C.	Source
2015–16	(United States) Dragon Racing	Spark SRT01-e	Venturi VM200-FE-01	M	No.	Drivers	143	4th	
2015–16	(United States) Dragon Racing	Spark SRT01-e	Venturi VM200-FE-01	M	6	(France) Loïc Duval	143	4th	
2015–16	(United States) Dragon Racing	Spark SRT01-e	Venturi VM200-FE-01	M	7	(Belgium) Jérôme d'Ambrosio	143	4th	
2018–19	(Germany) HWA Racelab	Spark SRT05e	Venturi VFE05	M	5	(Belgium) Stoffel Vandoorne	44	9th	
2018–19	(Germany) HWA Racelab	Spark SRT05e	Venturi VFE05	M	17	(United Kingdom) Gary Paffett	44	9th	
