= 2020 Berlin ePrix =

The 2020 Berlin ePrix (formally the 2020 Berlin E-Prix presented by CBMM Niobium) was a series of six Formula E races held at the Tempelhof Airport Street Circuit at Tempelhof Airport in the outskirts of Berlin between 5 and 13 August 2020. It formed the final six races of the 2019–20 Formula E season and was the sixth edition of the Berlin ePrix.

The event was promoted as 9 Days, 6 Races, 3 Tracks, 1 Champion; and The Season Six Finale.

== Report ==
=== Background ===
The Berlin ePrix was confirmed as part of Formula E's 2019–20 series schedule by the FIA World Motor Sport Council. It's the final six of twelve scheduled single-seater electric car races of the 2019–20 season, and the sixth running of the event. The ePrix was held using three different layouts at Tempelhof Airport Street Circuit at Berlin Tempelhof Airport between 5 and 13 August 2020.

Entering the race, DS Techeetah driver António Félix da Costa was leading the Drivers' Championship with 67 points, followed by Jaguar's driver Mitch Evans in second 11 points behind, and third placed Andretti-BMW's driver Alexander Sims 21 points behind the championship leader. In the team's standings, Techeetah lead with 98 points, followed behind by Andretti-BMW with 90 and Jaguar down in 3rd with 66 points.

=== Circuit layouts ===
The track layouts for the 9 days event were made available to the drivers and constructors on 21 July 2020.

The 6 races were further split into three 'double headers', each with a different track layout. The first two races (5 and 6 August) were carried out in the reverse layout, with drivers driving the usual Tempelhof circuit in a clockwise direction (the circuit is normally driven in anti-clockwise direction). The second double header (8 and 9 August) were driven in the traditional Tempelhof circuit layout (i.e. anti-clockwise direction). The last double header (12 and 13 August) use an extended circuit layout, with more turns added to the middle and final sectors of the track. Organizers billed this track layout as 'more technical'.

== Classification ==
=== Race 1 ===
2020 Berlin ePrix
Races 6 of 11 of the 2019–20 Formula E season
← Previous race
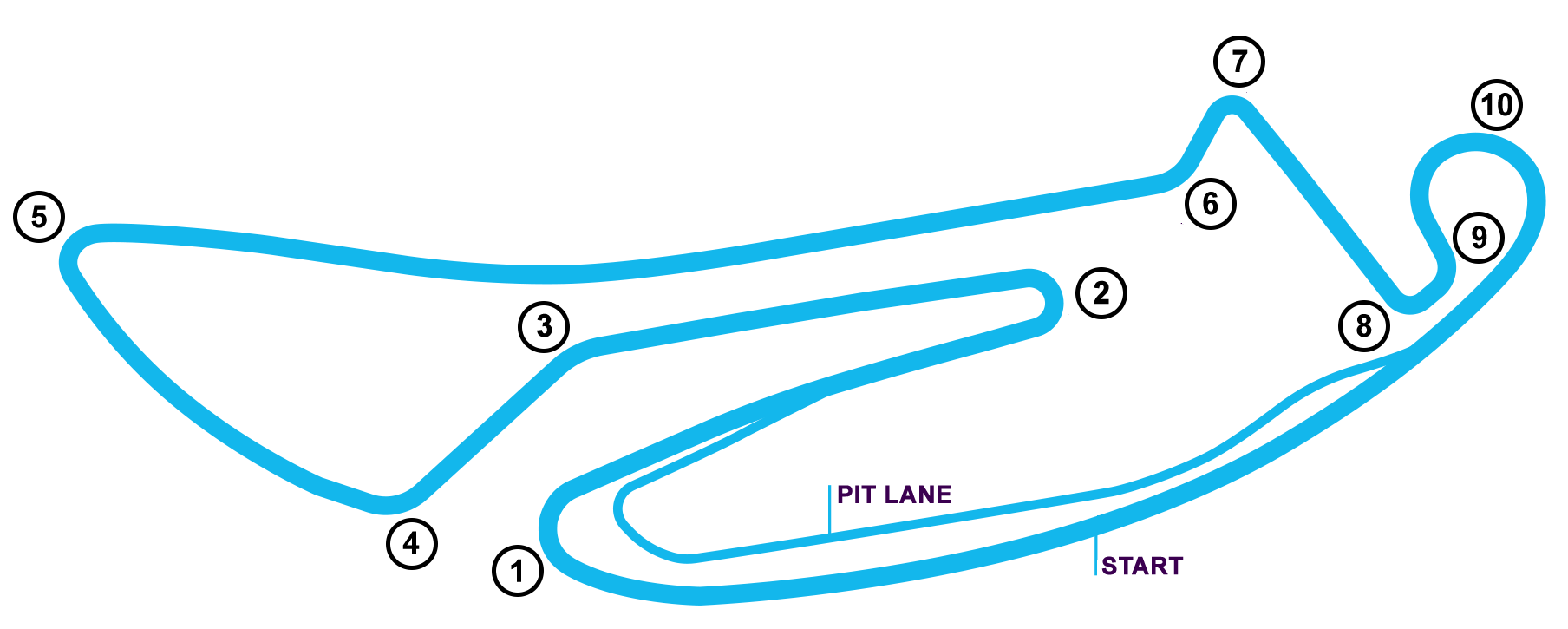

Race details
- Date: 5 August 2020
- Official name: 2020 Berlin E-Prix presented by CBMM Niobium
- Location: Tempelhof Airport Street Circuit, Berlin
- Course: Street circuit
- Course length: 2.355 km (1.463 mi)
- Distance: 36 laps, 84.78 km (52.68 mi)
- Weather: Warm and sunny
- Attendance: 0 (Note: The ePrix was held behind closed doors due to the COVID-19 pandemic in Germany.)

Pole position
Driver	(Portugal) António Félix da Costa	Techeetah-DS
- Time: 1:06.799

Fastest lap
Driver	(Portugal) António Félix da Costa	Techeetah-DS
- Time: 1:08.965 on lap 20

Podium
First	(Portugal) António Félix da Costa	Techeetah-DS
Second	(Germany) André Lotterer	Porsche
Third	(United Kingdom) Sam Bird	Virgin-Audi

==== Qualifying ====
Group draw
Group 1	(Portugal) DAC (1)	(New Zealand) EVA (2)	(United Kingdom) SIM (3)	(Germany) GUE (4)	(Brazil) DIG (5)	(Belgium) VAN (6)
Group 2	(Switzerland) MOR (7)	(France) JEV (8)	(United Kingdom) ROW (9)	(United Kingdom) BIR (10)	(Switzerland) BUE (11)	(Germany) LOT (12)
Group 3	(Netherlands) DEV (13)	(Netherlands) FRI (15)	(United Kingdom) CAL (16)	(Germany) ABT (17)	(Belgium) DAM (18)	(Brazil) MAS (19)
Group 4	(United Kingdom) TUR (21)	(Switzerland) MUL (22)	(Switzerland) JAN (23)	(United Kingdom) LYN (–)	(Brazil) SET (–)	(Germany) RAS (–)

Pos.	No.	Driver	Team	GS	SP	Grid
1	13	(Portugal) António Félix da Costa	Techeetah-DS	1:07.122	1:06.799	1
2	25	(France) Jean-Éric Vergne	Techeetah-DS	1:07.274	1:07.121	2
3	36	(Germany) André Lotterer	Porsche	1:07.454	1:07.235	3
4	23	(Switzerland) Sébastien Buemi	e.dams-Nissan	1:07.267	1:07.248	4
5	17	(Netherlands) Nyck de Vries	Mercedes	1:07.308	1:07.302	5
6	64	(Belgium) Jérôme d'Ambrosio	Mahindra	1:07.488	1:07.371	6
7	2	(United Kingdom) Sam Bird	Virgin-Audi	1:07.492	—N/a	7
8	22	(United Kingdom) Oliver Rowland	e.dams-Nissan	1:07.521	—N/a	PL^{1}
9	20	(New Zealand) Mitch Evans	Jaguar	1:07.555	—N/a	8
10	19	(Brazil) Felipe Massa	Venturi-Mercedes	1:07.563	—N/a	9
11	4	(Netherlands) Robin Frijns	Virgin-Audi	1:07.581	—N/a	10
12	94	(United Kingdom) Alex Lynn	Mahindra	1:07.646	—N/a	11
13	28	(Germany) Maximilian Günther	Andretti-BMW	1:07.685	—N/a	12
14	66	(Germany) René Rast	Audi	1:07.777	—N/a	13
15	48	(Switzerland) Edoardo Mortara	Venturi-Mercedes	1:07.826	—N/a	14
16	5	(Belgium) Stoffel Vandoorne	Mercedes	1:07.993	—N/a	15
17	27	(United Kingdom) Alexander Sims	Andretti-BMW	1:07.996	—N/a	16
18	18	(Switzerland) Neel Jani	Porsche	1:08.014	—N/a	17
19	3	(United Kingdom) Oliver Turvey	NIO	1:08.089	—N/a	18
20	7	(Switzerland) Nico Müller	Dragon-Penske	1:08.118	—N/a	19
21	11	(Brazil) Lucas di Grassi	Audi	1:08.136	—N/a	20
22	33	(Germany) Daniel Abt	NIO	1:08.554	—N/a	21
23	6	(Brazil) Sérgio Sette Câmara	Dragon-Penske	1:08.628	—N/a	22
24	51	(United Kingdom) James Calado	Jaguar	1:10.194	—N/a	24^{2}

Notes:

- ^1 – Oliver Rowland received a twenty-place grid penalty for inverter/MCU change. He also received a forty-place grid penalty for gearbox and inverter change, forcing him to start from the back of the grid For being unable to take the full grid drop (by only losing sixteen places on the grid), he received an additional 10 seconds stop and go penalty at the race.
- ^2 – James Calado received a sixty-place grid penalty for battery, inverter and MGU change, forcing him to start from the back of the grid. For being unable to take the full grid drop, he also received an additional 10 seconds stop and go penalty at the race.

==== Race ====
Pos.	No.	Driver	Team	Laps	Time/Retired	Grid	Points
1	13	(Portugal) António Félix da Costa	Techeetah-DS	36	47:08.261	1	25+3+1+1^{1}
2	36	(Germany) André Lotterer	Porsche	36	+5.445	3	18
3	2	(United Kingdom) Sam Bird	Virgin-Audi	36	+6.526	7	15
4	17	(Netherlands) Nyck de Vries	Mercedes	36	+6.911	5	12
5	64	(Belgium) Jérôme d'Ambrosio	Mahindra	36	+13.212	6	10
6	5	(Belgium) Stoffel Vandoorne	Mercedes	36	+13.654	15	8
7	23	(Switzerland) Sébastien Buemi	e.dams-Nissan	36	+14.926	4	6
8	11	(Brazil) Lucas di Grassi	Audi	36	+17.311	20	4
9	27	(United Kingdom) Alexander Sims	Andretti-BMW	36	+17.673	16	2
10	66	(Germany) René Rast	Audi	36	+18.852	13	1
11	18	(Switzerland) Neel Jani	Porsche	36	+21.039	17	
12	94	(United Kingdom) Alex Lynn	Mahindra	36	+21.603	11	
13	20	(New Zealand) Mitch Evans	Jaguar	36	+22.482	8	
14	22	(United Kingdom) Oliver Rowland	e.dams-Nissan	36	+23.208^{2}	PL	
15	51	(United Kingdom) James Calado	Jaguar	36	+28.906	24	
16	3	(United Kingdom) Oliver Turvey	NIO	36	+31.116	18	
17	48	(Switzerland) Edoardo Mortara	Venturi-Mercedes	36	+38.765^{3}	14	
18	33	(Germany) Daniel Abt	NIO	36	+39.282^{4}	21	
NC	25	(France) Jean-Éric Vergne	Techeetah-DS	36	+36.915	2	
NC	7	(Switzerland) Nico Müller	Dragon-Penske	36	+3:02.455	19	
Ret	19	(Brazil) Felipe Massa	Venturi-Mercedes	22	Accident	9	
Ret	4	(Netherlands) Robin Frijns	Virgin-Audi	8	Accident	10	
DSQ^{5}	28	(Germany) Maximilian Günther	Andretti-BMW	36	Energy usage	12	
DSQ^{5}	6	(Brazil) Sérgio Sette Câmara	Dragon-Penske	36	Energy usage	22	

Notes:

- ^1 – Pole position, fastest in group stage, and fastest lap.
- ^2 – Oliver Rowland received a five-second time penalty for being unable to take the full grid drop at the start.
- ^3 – Edoardo Mortara received a drive-through penalty converted into a 18-second time penalty for causing a collision.
- ^4 – Daniel Abt received a five-second time penalty for speeding under Full Course Yellow.
- ^5 – Maximilian Günther (who originally finished eighth) and Sérgio Sette Câmara (who originally finished twentieth) were both disqualified from the race due to their energy used being over regulatory limit.

==== Standings after the race ====
Drivers' Championship standings

+/–	Pos	Driver	Points
	1	(Portugal) António Félix da Costa	97
	2	(New Zealand) Mitch Evans	56
	3	(United Kingdom) Alexander Sims	48
2	4	(Belgium) Stoffel Vandoorne	46
1	5	(Germany) Maximilian Günther	44

Teams' Championship standings

+/–	Pos	Constructor	Points
	1	(China) Techeetah-DS	128
	2	(United States) Andretti-BMW	92
2	3	(Germany) Mercedes	76
1	4	(United Kingdom) Jaguar	66
1	5	(France) e.dams-Nissan	63

- Notes: Only the top five positions are included for both sets of standings.

2020 Berlin ePrix
- Races 7 of 11 of the 2019–20 Formula E season
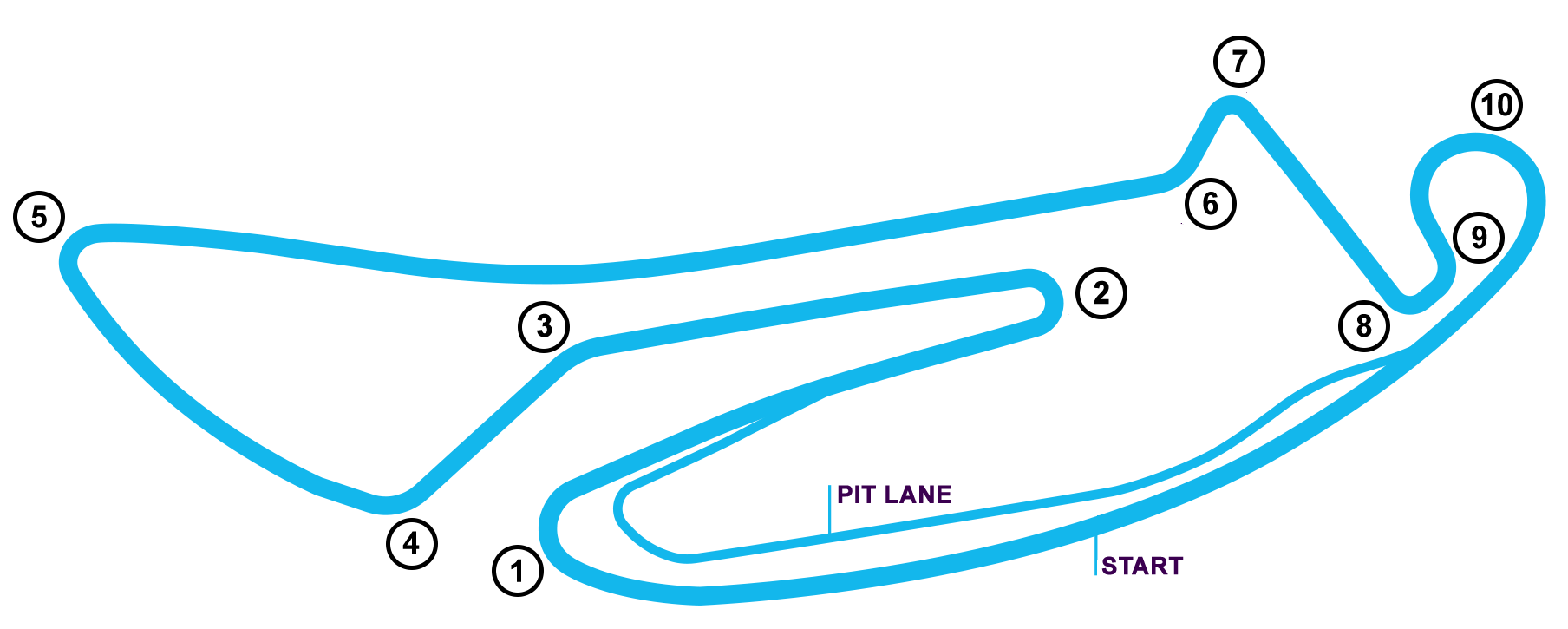

Race details
- Date: 6 August 2020
- Official name: 2020 Berlin E-Prix presented by CBMM Niobium
- Location: Tempelhof Airport Street Circuit, Berlin
- Course: Street circuit
- Course length: 2.355 km (1.463 mi)
- Distance: 38 laps, 89.49 km (55.61 mi)
- Weather: Warm and sunny
- Attendance: 0

Pole position
Driver	(Portugal) António Félix da Costa	Techeetah-DS
- Time: 1:06.442

Fastest lap
Driver	(Belgium) Stoffel Vandoorne	Mercedes
- Time: 1:08.635 on lap 21

Podium
First	(Portugal) António Félix da Costa	Techeetah-DS
Second	(Switzerland) Sébastien Buemi	e.dams-Nissan
Third	(Brazil) Lucas di Grassi	Audi

=== Race 2 ===
==== Qualifying ====
Group draw
Group 1	(Portugal) DAC (1)	(New Zealand) EVA (2)	(United Kingdom) SIM (3)	(Belgium) VAN (4)	(Germany) GUE (5)	(United Kingdom) BIR (6)
Group 2	(Germany) LOT (7)	(Brazil) DIG (8)	(Switzerland) BUE (9)	(Switzerland) MOR (10)	(France) JEV (11)	(Netherlands) DEV (12)
Group 3	(United Kingdom) ROW (13)	(Belgium) DAM (15)	(Netherlands) FRI (16)	(United Kingdom) CAL (17)	(Germany) ABT (18)	(Brazil) MAS (19)
Group 4	(Germany) RAS (21)	(United Kingdom) TUR (22)	(Switzerland) MUL (23)	(Switzerland) JAN (24)	(United Kingdom) LYN (25)	(Brazil) SET (27)

Pos.	No.	Driver	Team	GS	SP	Grid
1	13	(Portugal) António Félix da Costa	Techeetah-DS	1:06.791	1:06.442	1
2	23	(Switzerland) Sébastien Buemi	e.dams-Nissan	1:06.779	1:06.859	2
3	94	(United Kingdom) Alex Lynn	Mahindra	1:06.873	1:06.919	3
4	17	(Netherlands) Nyck de Vries	Mercedes	1:06.951	1:06.921	4
5	4	(Netherlands) Robin Frijns	Virgin-Audi	1:06.924	1:06.974	5
6	11	(Brazil) Lucas di Grassi	Audi	1:06.961	1:07.292	6
7	22	(United Kingdom) Oliver Rowland	e.dams-Nissan	1:07.018	—N/a	7
8	25	(France) Jean-Éric Vergne	Techeetah-DS	1:07.035	—N/a	8
9	2	(United Kingdom) Sam Bird	Virgin-Audi	1:07.148	—N/a	9
10	48	(Switzerland) Edoardo Mortara	Venturi-Mercedes	1:07.218	—N/a	10
11	28	(Germany) Maximilian Günther	Andretti-BMW	1:07.269	—N/a	11
12	36	(Germany) André Lotterer	Porsche	1:07.285	—N/a	12
13	5	(Belgium) Stoffel Vandoorne	Mercedes	1:07.292	—N/a	13
14	64	(Belgium) Jérôme d'Ambrosio	Mahindra	1:07.338	—N/a	14
15	27	(United Kingdom) Alexander Sims	Andretti-BMW	1:07.368	—N/a	PL^{1}
16	3	(United Kingdom) Oliver Turvey	NIO	1:07.451	—N/a	15
17	20	(New Zealand) Mitch Evans	Jaguar	1:07.516	—N/a	16
18	19	(Brazil) Felipe Massa	Venturi-Mercedes	1:07.557	—N/a	17
19	7	(Switzerland) Nico Müller	Dragon-Penske	1:07.581	—N/a	18
20	18	(Switzerland) Neel Jani	Porsche	1:07.640	—N/a	19
21	6	(Brazil) Sérgio Sette Câmara	Dragon-Penske	1:07.846	—N/a	20
22	33	(Germany) Daniel Abt	NIO	1:08.005	—N/a	21
23	51	(United Kingdom) James Calado	Jaguar	1:08.432	—N/a	22
24	66	(Germany) René Rast	Audi	1:08.464	—N/a	PL

Notes:

- ^1 – Alexander Sims received a twenty-place grid penalty for battery change.

==== Race ====
Pos.	No.	Driver	Team	Laps	Time/Retired	Grid	Points
1	13	(Portugal) António Félix da Costa	Techeetah-DS	38	46:19.412	1	25+3^{1}
2	23	(Switzerland) Sébastien Buemi	e.dams-Nissan	38	+3.090	2	18+1^{2}
3	11	(Brazil) Lucas di Grassi	Audi	38	+8.296	6	15
4	4	(Netherlands) Robin Frijns	Virgin-Audi	38	+9.239	5	12
5	5	(Belgium) Stoffel Vandoorne	Mercedes	38	+9.695	13	10+1^{3}
6	2	(United Kingdom) Sam Bird	Virgin-Audi	38	+10.081	9	8
7	22	(United Kingdom) Oliver Rowland	e.dams-Nissan	38	+13.897	7	6
8	48	(Switzerland) Edoardo Mortara	Venturi-Mercedes	38	+16.367	10	4
9	36	(Germany) André Lotterer	Porsche	38	+16.893	12	2
10	25	(France) Jean-Éric Vergne	Techeetah-DS	38	+20.919	8	1
11	94	(United Kingdom) Alex Lynn	Mahindra	38	+21.288	3	
12	20	(New Zealand) Mitch Evans	Jaguar	38	+22.157	16	
13	66	(Germany) René Rast	Audi	38	+22.631	PL	
14	7	(Switzerland) Nico Müller	Dragon-Penske	38	+23.579	18	
15	18	(Switzerland) Neel Jani	Porsche	38	+26.381	19	
16	33	(Germany) Daniel Abt	NIO	38	+35.424	21	
17	6	(Brazil) Sérgio Sette Câmara	Dragon-Penske	38	+35.727	20	
18	3	(United Kingdom) Oliver Turvey	NIO	38	+36.356	15	
19	27	(United Kingdom) Alexander Sims	Andretti-BMW	38	+42.395	PL	
20	51	(United Kingdom) James Calado	Jaguar	38	+52.828	22	
NC	19	(Brazil) Felipe Massa	Venturi-Mercedes	38	+1:21.241	17	
Ret	28	(Germany) Maximilian Günther	Andretti-BMW	27	Accident damage	11	
Ret	17	(Netherlands) Nyck de Vries	Mercedes	15	Electronics	4	
DSQ^{4}	64	(Belgium) Jérôme d'Ambrosio	Mahindra	38	Energy usage	14	

Notes:

- ^1 – Pole position.
- ^2 – Fastest in group stage.
- ^3 – Fastest lap.
- ^4 – Jérôme d'Ambrosio originally finished fifteenth, but was disqualified from the race due to his energy used being over regulatory limit.

==== Standings after the race ====
Drivers' Championship standings

+/–	Pos	Driver	Points
	1	(Portugal) António Félix da Costa	125
6	2	(Brazil) Lucas di Grassi	57
1	3	(Belgium) Stoffel Vandoorne	57
2	4	(New Zealand) Mitch Evans	56
1	5	(United Kingdom) Sam Bird	52

Teams' Championship standings

+/–	Pos	Constructor	Points
	1	(China) Techeetah-DS	157
	2	(United States) Andretti-BMW	92
2	3	(France) e.dams-Nissan	88
1	4	(Germany) Mercedes	87
1	5	(United Kingdom) Virgin-Audi	74

- Notes: Only the top five positions are included for both sets of standings.

2020 Berlin ePrix
- Races 8 of 11 of the 2019–20 Formula E season

Race details
- Date: 8 August 2020
- Official name: 2020 Berlin E-Prix
- Location: Tempelhof Airport Street Circuit, Berlin
- Course: Street circuit
- Course length: 2.355 km (1.463 mi)
- Distance: 35 laps, 82.425 km (51.217 mi)
- Weather: Warm and sunny
- Attendance: 0

Pole position
Driver	(France) Jean-Éric Vergne	Techeetah-DS
- Time: 1:06.277

Fastest lap
Driver	(New Zealand) Mitch Evans	Jaguar
- Time: 1:08.350 on lap 19

Podium
First	(Germany) Maximilian Günther	Andretti-BMW
Second	(Netherlands) Robin Frijns	Virgin-Audi
Third	(France) Jean-Éric Vergne	Techeetah-DS

=== Race 3 ===
==== Qualifying ====
Group draw
Group 1	(Portugal) DAC (1)	(Brazil) DIG (2)	(Belgium) VAN (3)	(New Zealand) EVA (4)	(United Kingdom) BIR (5)	(Switzerland) BUE (6)
Group 2	(United Kingdom) SIM (7)	(Germany) LOT (8)	(Germany) GUE (9)	(United Kingdom) ROW (10)	(Switzerland) MOR (11)	(France) JEV (12)
Group 3	(Netherlands) DEV (13)	(Netherlands) FRI (14)	(Belgium) DAM (16)	(United Kingdom) CAL (17)	(Germany) ABT (18)	(Brazil) MAS (19)
Group 4	(Germany) RAS (21)	(United Kingdom) TUR (22)	(Switzerland) MUL (23)	(Switzerland) JAN (24)	(United Kingdom) LYN (25)	(Brazil) SET (27)

Pos.	No.	Driver	Team	GS	SP	Grid
1	25	(France) Jean-Éric Vergne	Techeetah-DS	1:06.597	1:06.277	1
2	28	(Germany) Maximilian Günther	Andretti-BMW	1:06.856	1:06.772	2
3	64	(Belgium) Jérôme d'Ambrosio	Mahindra	1:06.748	1:06.825	3
4	5	(Belgium) Stoffel Vandoorne	Mercedes	1:06.714	1:06.965	4
5	94	(United Kingdom) Alex Lynn	Mahindra	1:06.731	1:07.177	5
6	4	(Netherlands) Robin Frijns	Virgin-Audi	1:06.740	1:07.180	6
7	36	(Germany) André Lotterer	Porsche	1:06.867	—N/a	7
8	17	(Netherlands) Nyck de Vries	Mercedes	1:06.907	—N/a	13^{1}
9	13	(Portugal) António Félix da Costa	Techeetah-DS	1:06.938	—N/a	8
10	22	(United Kingdom) Oliver Rowland	e.dams-Nissan	1:06.947	—N/a	9
11	11	(Brazil) Lucas di Grassi	Audi	1:06.960	—N/a	10
12	6	(Brazil) Sérgio Sette Câmara	Dragon-Penske	1:07.077	—N/a	11
13	19	(Brazil) Felipe Massa	Venturi-Mercedes	1:07.090	—N/a	12
14	48	(Switzerland) Edoardo Mortara	Venturi-Mercedes	1:07.098	—N/a	14
15	23	(Switzerland) Sébastien Buemi	e.dams-Nissan	1:07.140	—N/a	15
16	27	(United Kingdom) Alexander Sims	Andretti-BMW	1:07.141	—N/a	16
17	51	(United Kingdom) James Calado	Jaguar	1:07.147	—N/a	17
18	18	(Switzerland) Neel Jani	Porsche	1:07.193	—N/a	18
19	20	(New Zealand) Mitch Evans	Jaguar	1:07.197	—N/a	19
20	2	(United Kingdom) Sam Bird	Virgin-Audi	1:07.208	—N/a	20
21	66	(Germany) René Rast	Audi	1:07.261	—N/a	21
22	33	(Germany) Daniel Abt	NIO	1:07.331	—N/a	22
23	7	(Switzerland) Nico Müller	Dragon-Penske	1:07.366	—N/a	23
24	3	(United Kingdom) Oliver Turvey	NIO	1:07.521	—N/a	24

Notes:

- ^1 – Nyck de Vries received a five-place grid penalty for pushing his car on the track without permission from the stewards in the previous race.

==== Race ====
Pos.	No.	Driver	Team	Laps	Time/Retired	Grid	Points
1	28	(Germany) Maximilian Günther	Andretti-BMW	35	46:15.512	2	25
2	4	(Netherlands) Robin Frijns	Virgin-Audi	35	+0.128	6	18
3	25	(France) Jean-Éric Vergne	Techeetah-DS	35	+2.569	1	15+3+1^{1}
4	13	(Portugal) António Félix da Costa	Techeetah-DS	35	+2.743	8	12
5	36	(Germany) André Lotterer	Porsche	35	+3.136	7	10
6	22	(United Kingdom) Oliver Rowland	e.dams-Nissan	35	+5.547	9	8
7	64	(Belgium) Jérôme d'Ambrosio	Mahindra	35	+7.893	3	6
8	11	(Brazil) Lucas di Grassi	Audi	35	+12.672	10	4
9	20	(New Zealand) Mitch Evans	Jaguar	35	+13.511	19	2+1^{2}
10	27	(United Kingdom) Alexander Sims	Andretti-BMW	35	+19.248	16	1
11	23	(Switzerland) Sébastien Buemi	e.dams-Nissan	35	+20.240	15	
12	7	(Switzerland) Nico Müller	Dragon-Penske	35	+20.486	23	
13	2	(United Kingdom) Sam Bird	Virgin-Audi	35	+20.733	20	
14	48	(Switzerland) Edoardo Mortara	Venturi-Mercedes	35	+20.944	14	
15	33	(Germany) Daniel Abt	NIO	35	+21.948	22	
16	3	(United Kingdom) Oliver Turvey	NIO	35	+22.774	24	
17	94	(United Kingdom) Alex Lynn	Mahindra	35	+23.181	5	
18	17	(Netherlands) Nyck de Vries	Mercedes	35	+32.520^{3}	13	
19	19	(Brazil) Felipe Massa	Venturi-Mercedes	35	+36.549	12	
Ret	66	(Germany) René Rast	Audi	30	Electronics	21	
Ret	5	(Belgium) Stoffel Vandoorne	Mercedes	17	Puncture	4	
Ret	51	(United Kingdom) James Calado	Jaguar	13	Collision damage	17	
Ret	6	(Brazil) Sérgio Sette Câmara	Dragon-Penske	10	Collision	11	
Ret	18	(Switzerland) Neel Jani	Porsche	10	Collision	18	

Notes:

- ^1 – Pole position, fastest in group stage.
- ^2 – Fastest Lap.
- ^3 – Nyck de Vries received a ten-second time penalty for causing a collision.

==== Standings after the race ====
Drivers' Championship standings

+/–	Pos	Driver	Points
	1	(Portugal) António Félix da Costa	137
7	2	(Germany) Maximilian Günther	69
1	3	(Brazil) Lucas di Grassi	61
	4	(New Zealand) Mitch Evans	59
2	5	(Belgium) Stoffel Vandoorne	52

Teams' Championship standings

+/–	Pos	Constructor	Points
	1	(China) Techeetah-DS	188
	2	(United States) Andretti-BMW	118
	3	(France) e.dams-Nissan	96
1	4	(United Kingdom) Virgin-Audi	92
1	5	(Germany) Mercedes	87

- Notes: Only the top five positions are included for both sets of standings.

=== Race 4 ===
2020 Berlin ePrix
- Race 9 of 11 of the 2019–20 Formula E season

Race details
- Date: 9 August 2020
- Official name: 2020 Berlin E-Prix
- Location: Tempelhof Airport Street Circuit, Berlin
- Course: Street circuit
- Course length: 2.355 km (1.463 mi)
- Distance: 37 laps, 87.135 km (54.143 mi)
- Weather: Partly cloudy
- Attendance: 0

Pole position
Driver	(France) Jean-Éric Vergne	Techeetah-DS
- Time: 1:06.107

Fastest lap
Driver	(United Kingdom) Sam Bird (Portugal) A. Félix da Costa (Note: Félix da Costa received the point for fastest lap as Bird failed to finish inside the top 10.)	Virgin-Audi; Techeetah-DS
- Time: 1:08.556 (1:08.577) on lap 11 (25)

Podium
First	(France) Jean-Eric Vergne	Techeetah-DS
Second	(Portugal) António Félix da Costa	Techeetah-DS
Third	(Switzerland) Sébastien Buemi	e.dams-Nissan

==== Qualifying ====
Group draw
Group 1	(Portugal) DAC (1)	(Germany) GUE (2)	(Brazil) DIG (3)	(New Zealand) EVA (4)	(Belgium) VAN (5)	(Germany) LOT (6)
Group 2	(United Kingdom) BIR (7)	(Switzerland) BUE (8)	(France) JEV (9)	(United Kingdom) SIM (10)	(United Kingdom) ROW (11)	(Netherlands) FRI (12)
Group 3	(Switzerland) MOR (13)	(Netherlands) DEV (14)	(Belgium) DAM (15)	(United Kingdom) CAL (17)	(Germany) ABT (18)	(Brazil) MAS (19)
Group 4	(Germany) RAS (21)	(United Kingdom) TUR (22)	(Switzerland) MUL (23)	(Switzerland) JAN (24)	(United Kingdom) LYN (25)	(Brazil) SET (27)

Pos.	No.	Driver	Team	GS	SP	Grid
1	25	(France) Jean-Éric Vergne	Techeetah-DS	1:06.107	1:06.484	1
2	13	(Portugal) António Félix da Costa	Techeetah-DS	1:06.856	1:06.772	2
3	22	(United Kingdom) Oliver Rowland	e.dams-Nissan	1:06.484	1:06.552	3
4	23	(Switzerland) Sébastien Buemi	e.dams-Nissan	1:06.700	1:06.564	4
5	17	(Netherlands) Nyck de Vries	Mercedes	1:06.575	1:06.597	5
6	19	(Brazil) Felipe Massa	Venturi-Mercedes	1:06.674	1:06.777	6
7	94	(United Kingdom) Alex Lynn	Mahindra	1:06.741	—N/a	7
8	66	(Germany) René Rast	Audi	1:06.754	—N/a	8
9	64	(Belgium) Jérôme d'Ambrosio	Mahindra	1:06.778	—N/a	9
10	4	(Netherlands) Robin Frijns	Virgin-Audi	1:06.818	—N/a	10
11	20	(New Zealand) Mitch Evans	Jaguar	1:06.859	—N/a	11
12	11	(Brazil) Lucas di Grassi	Audi	1:06.866	—N/a	12
13	48	(Switzerland) Edoardo Mortara	Venturi-Mercedes	1:06.870	—N/a	13
14	51	(United Kingdom) James Calado	Jaguar	1:06.904	—N/a	14
15	7	(Switzerland) Nico Müller	Dragon-Penske	1:06.940	—N/a	15
16	27	(United Kingdom) Alexander Sims	Andretti-BMW	1:06.951	—N/a	16
17	2	(United Kingdom) Sam Bird	Virgin-Audi	1:06.953	—N/a	17
18	36	(Germany) André Lotterer	Porsche	1:07.036	—N/a	18
19	3	(United Kingdom) Oliver Turvey	NIO	1:07.038	—N/a	19
20	5	(Belgium) Stoffel Vandoorne	Mercedes	1:07.064	—N/a	20
21	28	(Germany) Maximilian Günther	Andretti-BMW	1:07.103	—N/a	21
22	18	(Switzerland) Neel Jani	Porsche	1:07.119	—N/a	22
23	33	(Germany) Daniel Abt	NIO	1:07.351	—N/a	23
24	6	(Brazil) Sérgio Sette Câmara	Dragon-Penske	1:07.492	—N/a	24^{1}

Notes:

- ^1 – Sérgio Sette Câmara received a three-place grid penalty for causing a collision in the previous round.

==== Race ====
Pos.	No.	Driver	Team	Laps	Time/Retired	Grid	Points
1	25	(France) Jean-Éric Vergne	Techeetah-DS	37	46:24.803	1	25+3+1^{1}
2	13	(Portugal) António Félix da Costa	Techeetah-DS	37	+0.497	2	18+1^{2}
3	23	(Switzerland) Sébastien Buemi	e.dams-Nissan	37	+1.392	4	15
4	17	(Netherlands) Nyck de Vries	Mercedes	37	+3.791	5	12
5	22	(United Kingdom) Oliver Rowland	e.dams-Nissan	37	+5.018	3	10
6	11	(Brazil) Lucas di Grassi	Audi	37	+9.805	12	8
7	20	(New Zealand) Mitch Evans	Jaguar	37	+14.814	11	6
8	36	(Germany) André Lotterer	Porsche	37	+15.755	18	4
9	94	(United Kingdom) Alex Lynn	Mahindra	37	+21.001	7	2
10	19	(Brazil) Felipe Massa	Venturi-Mercedes	37	+22.809	6	1
11	2	(United Kingdom) Sam Bird	Virgin-Audi	37	+22.911	17	
12	5	(Belgium) Stoffel Vandoorne	Mercedes	37	+23.388	20	
13	27	(United Kingdom) Alexander Sims	Andretti-BMW	37	+23.575	16	
14	48	(Switzerland) Edoardo Mortara	Venturi-Mercedes	37	+23.889	13	
15	64	(Belgium) Jérôme d'Ambrosio	Mahindra	37	+23.914	9	
16	66	(Germany) René Rast	Audi	37	+24.381	8	
17	51	(United Kingdom) James Calado	Jaguar	37	+26.600	14	
18	33	(Germany) Daniel Abt	NIO	37	+29.121	23	
19	18	(Switzerland) Neel Jani	Porsche	37	+29.527	22	
20	7	(Switzerland) Nico Müller	Dragon-Penske	37	+34.431	15	
21	6	(Brazil) Sérgio Sette Câmara	Dragon-Penske	37	+36.315	24	
22	3	(United Kingdom) Oliver Turvey	NIO	37	+1:01.473	19	
Ret	28	(Germany) Maximilian Günther	Andretti-BMW	0	Collision	21	
DNS	4	(Netherlands) Robin Frijns	Virgin-Audi	0	Did not start	10	

Notes:

- ^1 – Pole position, fastest in group stage.
- ^2 – Fastest Lap

==== Standings after the race ====
Drivers' Championship standings

+/–	Pos	Driver	Points
	1	(Portugal) António Félix da Costa	156
7	2	(France) Jean-Éric Vergne	80
1	3	(Germany) Maximilian Günther	69
1	4	(Brazil) Lucas di Grassi	69
3	5	(Switzerland) Sébastien Buemi	67

Teams' Championship standings

+/–	Pos	Constructor	Points
	1	(China) Techeetah-DS	236
1	2	(France) e.dams-Nissan	121
1	3	(United States) Andretti-BMW	118
1	4	(Germany) Mercedes	99
1	5	(United Kingdom) Virgin-Audi	92

- Notes: Only the top five positions are included for both sets of standings.

=== Race 5 ===
2020 Berlin ePrix
- Race 10 of 11 of the 2019–20 Formula E season
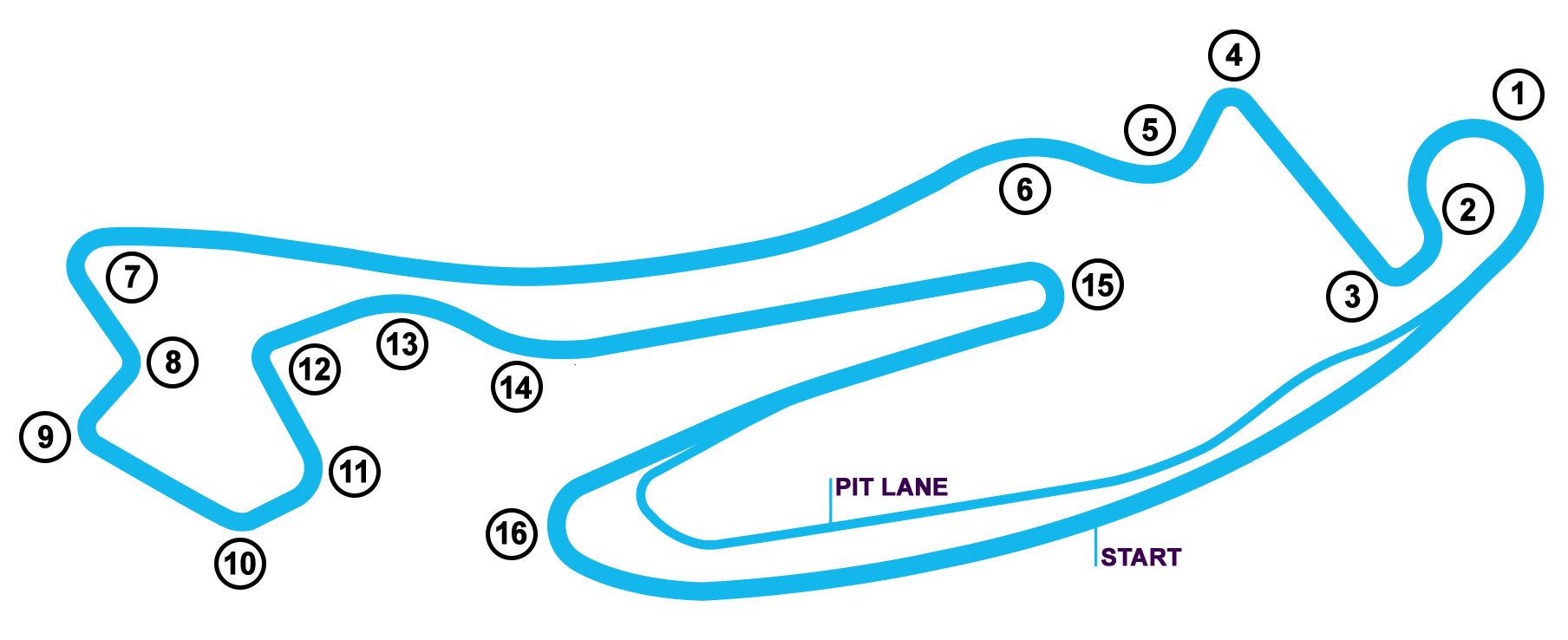

Race details
- Date: 12 August 2020
- Official name: 2020 Berlin E-Prix
- Location: Tempelhof Airport Street Circuit, Berlin
- Course: Street circuit
- Course length: 2.505 km (1.557 mi)
- Distance: 36 laps, 90.18 km (56.04 mi)
- Weather: Partly cloudy
- Attendance: 0

Pole position
Driver	(United Kingdom) Oliver Rowland	e.dams-Nissan
- Time: 1:15.955

Fastest lap
Driver	(Brazil) Lucas di Grassi (United Kingdom) Oliver Rowland (Note: Rowland received the point for fastest lap as di Grassi failed to finish inside the top 10.)	Audi e.dams-Nissan
- Time: 1:17.232 (1:17.886) on lap 31 (10)

Podium
First	(United Kingdom) Oliver Rowland	e.dams-Nissan
Second	(Netherlands) Robin Frijns	Virgin-Audi
Third	(Germany) René Rast	Audi

==== Qualifying ====
Group draw
Group 1	(Portugal) DAC (1)	(France) JEV (2)	(Germany) GUE (3)	(Brazil) DIG (4)	(Switzerland) BUE (5)	(New Zealand) EVA (6)
Group 2	(Germany) LOT (7)	(Belgium) VAN (8)	(United Kingdom) ROW (9)	(United Kingdom) BIR (10)	(United Kingdom) SIM (11)	(Netherlands) DEV (12)
Group 3	(Netherlands) FRI (13)	(Switzerland) MOR (14)	(Belgium) DAM (15)	(Germany) ABT (18)	(Brazil) MAS (19)	(United Kingdom) LYN (20)
Group 4	(Germany) RAS (22)	(United Kingdom) TUR (23)	(Switzerland) MUL (24)	(Switzerland) JAN (25)	(Brazil) SET (27)	(United Kingdom) BLO (–)

Pos.	No.	Driver	Team	GS	SP	Grid
1	22	(United Kingdom) Oliver Rowland	e.dams-Nissan	1:16.191	1:15.955	1
2	4	(Netherlands) Robin Frijns	Virgin-Audi	1:16.187	1:16.004	2
3	18	(Switzerland) Neel Jani	Porsche	1:16.234	1:16.052	3
4	66	(Germany) René Rast	Audi	1:15.993	1:16.127	4
5	94	(United Kingdom) Alex Lynn	Mahindra	1:16.158	1:16.192	5
6	51	(United Kingdom) Tom Blomqvist	Jaguar	1:16.226	1:16.529	6
7	36	(Germany) André Lotterer	Porsche	1:16.241	—N/a	7
8	19	(Brazil) Felipe Massa	Venturi-Mercedes	1:16.251	—N/a	8
9	6	(Brazil) Sérgio Sette Câmara	Dragon-Penske	1:16.292	—N/a	9
10	48	(Switzerland) Edoardo Mortara	Venturi-Mercedes	1:16.296	—N/a	10
11	7	(Switzerland) Nico Müller	Dragon-Penske	1:16.327	—N/a	11
12	3	(United Kingdom) Oliver Turvey	NIO	1:16.328	—N/a	12
13	28	(Germany) Maximilian Günther	Andretti-BMW	1:16.394	—N/a	13
14	20	(New Zealand) Mitch Evans	Jaguar	1:16.395	—N/a	14
15	27	(United Kingdom) Alexander Sims	Andretti-BMW	1:16.449	—N/a	15
16	2	(United Kingdom) Sam Bird	Virgin-Audi	1:16.524	—N/a	16
17	64	(Belgium) Jérôme d'Ambrosio	Mahindra	1:16.539	—N/a	17
18	5	(Belgium) Stoffel Vandoorne	Mercedes	1:16.646	—N/a	18
19	17	(Netherlands) Nyck de Vries	Mercedes	1:16.755	—N/a	19
20	33	(Germany) Daniel Abt	NIO	1:16.868	—N/a	20
DNQ	11	(Brazil) Lucas di Grassi	Audi	no time	—N/a	23
DNQ	13	(Portugal) António Félix da Costa	Techeetah-DS	no time	—N/a	21
DNQ	23	(Switzerland) Sébastien Buemi	e.dams-Nissan	no time	—N/a	22
DNQ	25	(France) Jean-Éric Vergne	Techeetah-DS	no time	—N/a	24

==== Race ====
Pos.	No.	Driver	Team	Laps	Time/Retired	Grid	Points
1	22	(United Kingdom) Oliver Rowland	e.dams-Nissan	36	47:28.880	1	25+3+1^{1}
2	4	(Netherlands) Robin Frijns	Virgin-Audi	36	+1.903	2	18
3	66	(Germany) René Rast	Audi	36	+7.490	4	15+1^{2}
4	36	(Germany) André Lotterer	Porsche	36	+7.863	7	12
5	94	(United Kingdom) Alex Lynn	Mahindra	36	+11.441	5	10
6	18	(Switzerland) Neel Jani	Porsche	36	+12.922	3	8
7	20	(New Zealand) Mitch Evans	Jaguar	36	+14.106	14	6
8	48	(Switzerland) Edoardo Mortara	Venturi-Mercedes	36	+17.134	10	4
9	5	(Belgium) Stoffel Vandoorne	Mercedes	36	+18.949	18	2
10	23	(Switzerland) Sébastien Buemi	e.dams-Nissan	36	+19.731	22	1
11	27	(United Kingdom) Alexander Sims	Andretti-BMW	36	+23.331	15	
12	51	(United Kingdom) Tom Blomqvist	Jaguar	36	+24.807	6	
13	19	(Brazil) Felipe Massa	Venturi-Mercedes	36	+27.775	8	
14	17	(Netherlands) Nyck de Vries	Mercedes	36	+28.723	19	
15	6	(Brazil) Sérgio Sette Câmara	Dragon-Penske	36	+31.132	9	
16	64	(Belgium) Jérôme d'Ambrosio	Mahindra	36	+31.524	17	
17	7	(Switzerland) Nico Müller	Dragon-Penske	36	+34.140	11	
18	25	(France) Jean-Éric Vergne	Techeetah-DS	36	+34.986	24	
19	3	(United Kingdom) Oliver Turvey	NIO	36	+44.377	12	
20	2	(United Kingdom) Sam Bird	Virgin-Audi	36	+46.591	16	
21	11	(Brazil) Lucas di Grassi	Audi	36	+1:15.119	23	
Ret	13	(Portugal) António Félix da Costa	Techeetah-DS	35	Electronics	21	
Ret	33	(Germany) Daniel Abt	NIO	33	Technical	20	
Ret	28	(Germany) Maximilian Günther	Andretti-BMW	4	Puncture	13	

Notes:

- ^1 – Pole position, fastest lap
- ^2 – Fastest in group stage.

==== Standings after the race ====
Drivers' Championship standings

+/–	Pos	Driver	Points
	1	(Portugal) António Félix da Costa	156
7	2	(United Kingdom) Oliver Rowland	83
1	3	(France) Jean-Éric Vergne	80
2	4	(New Zealand) Mitch Evans	71
2	5	(Germany) André Lotterer	71

Teams' Championship standings

+/–	Pos	Constructor	Points
	1	(China) Techeetah-DS	236
	2	(France) e.dams-Nissan	151
	3	(United States) Andretti-BMW	118
1	4	(United Kingdom) Virgin-Audi	110
1	5	(Germany) Mercedes	101

- Notes: Only the top five positions are included for both sets of standings.

=== Race 6 ===
2020 Berlin ePrix
- Race 11 of 11 of the 2019–20 Formula E season
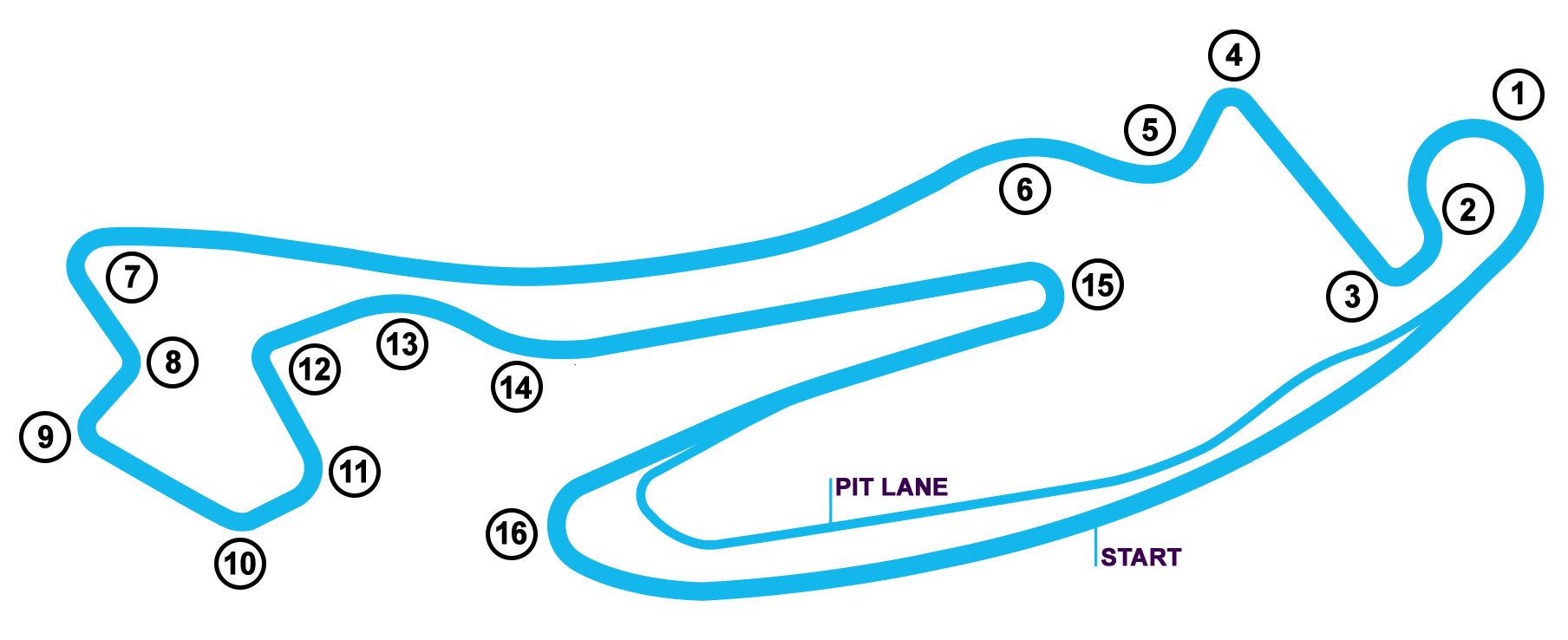

Race details
- Date: 13 August 2020
- Official name: 2020 Berlin E-Prix
- Location: Tempelhof Airport Street Circuit, Berlin
- Course: Street circuit
- Course length: 2.505 km (1.557 mi)
- Distance: 36 laps, 90.18 km (56.04 mi)
- Weather: Partly cloudy
- Attendance: 0

Pole position
Driver	(Belgium) Stoffel Vandoorne	Mercedes
- Time: 1:15.468

Fastest lap
Driver	(Switzerland) Nico Müller (United Kingdom) Sam Bird (Note: Bird received the point for fastest lap as Müller failed to finish inside the top 10.)	Dragon-Penske; Virgin-Audi
- Time: 1:17.469 (1:17.562) on lap 29 (21)

Podium
First	(Belgium) Stoffel Vandoorne	Mercedes
Second	(Netherlands) Nyck de Vries	Mercedes
Third	(Switzerland) Sébastien Buemi	e.dams-Nissan

==== Qualifying ====
Group draw
Group 1	(Portugal) DAC (1)	(United Kingdom) ROW (2)	(France) JEV (3)	(New Zealand) EVA (4)	(Germany) LOT (5)	(Germany) GUE (6)
Group 2	(Brazil) DIG (7)	(Switzerland) BUE (8)	(Belgium) VAN (9)	(Netherlands) FRI (10)	(United Kingdom) BIR (11)	(United Kingdom) SIM (12)
Group 3	(Netherlands) DEV (13)	(Switzerland) MOR (14)	(Belgium) DAM (15)	(Germany) RAS (16)	(United Kingdom) LYN (18)	(Switzerland) JAN (20)
Group 4	(Germany) ABT (21)	(Brazil) MAS (22)	(United Kingdom) TUR (24)	(Switzerland) MUL (25)	(United Kingdom) BLO (26)	(Brazil) SET (27)

Pos.	No.	Driver	Team	GS	SP	Grid
1	5	(Belgium) Stoffel Vandoorne	Mercedes	1:15.717	1:15.468	1
2	23	(Switzerland) Sébastien Buemi	e.dams-Nissan	1:15.660	1:15.527	2
3	66	(Germany) René Rast	Audi	1:15.688	1:15.720	3
4	17	(Netherlands) Nyck de Vries	Mercedes	1:15.729	1:15.738	4
5	4	(Netherlands) Robin Frijns	Virgin-Audi	1:15.793	1:15.867	5
6	48	(Switzerland) Edoardo Mortara	Venturi-Mercedes	1:15.848	1:16.055	6
7	94	(United Kingdom) Alex Lynn	Mahindra	1:15.851	—N/a	7
8	18	(Switzerland) Neel Jani	Porsche	1:15.861	—N/a	8
9	6	(Brazil) Sérgio Sette Câmara	Dragon-Penske	1:15.904	—N/a	9
10	11	(Brazil) Lucas di Grassi	Audi	1:15.915	—N/a	10
11	19	(Brazil) Felipe Massa	Venturi-Mercedes	1:15.937	—N/a	11
12	51	(United Kingdom) Tom Blomqvist	Jaguar	1:15.958	—N/a	12
13	3	(United Kingdom) Oliver Turvey	NIO	1:15.958	—N/a	13
14	2	(United Kingdom) Sam Bird	Virgin-Audi	1:16.002	—N/a	14
15	27	(United Kingdom) Alexander Sims	Andretti-BMW	1:16.028	—N/a	15
16	64	(Belgium) Jérôme d'Ambrosio	Mahindra	1:16.057	—N/a	16
17	33	(Germany) Daniel Abt	NIO	1:16.109	—N/a	17
18	28	(Germany) Maximilian Günther	Andretti-BMW	1:16.134	—N/a	18
19	13	(Portugal) António Félix da Costa	Techeetah-DS	1:16.176	—N/a	19
20	36	(Germany) André Lotterer	Porsche	1:16.317	—N/a	20
21	25	(France) Jean-Éric Vergne	Techeetah-DS	1:16.393	—N/a	21
22	7	(Switzerland) Nico Müller	Dragon-Penske	1:16.409	—N/a	PL
23	20	(New Zealand) Mitch Evans	Jaguar	1:16.449	—N/a	23
24	22	(United Kingdom) Oliver Rowland	e.dams-Nissan	1:16.993	—N/a	24

==== Race ====
Pos.	No.	Driver	Team	Laps	Time/Retired	Grid	Points
1	5	(Belgium) Stoffel Vandoorne	Mercedes	36	47:22.107	1	25+3^{1}
2	17	(Netherlands) Nyck de Vries	Mercedes	36	+1.340	4	18
3	23	(Switzerland) Sébastien Buemi	e.dams-Nissan	36	+2.841	2	15+1^{2}
4	66	(Germany) René Rast	Audi	36	+3.580	3	12
5	2	(United Kingdom) Sam Bird	Virgin-Audi	36	+8.710	14	10+1^{3}
6	11	(Brazil) Lucas di Grassi	Audi	36	+11.593	10	8
7	25	(France) Jean-Éric Vergne	Techeetah-DS	36	+12.895	21	6
8	94	(United Kingdom) Alex Lynn	Mahindra	36	+14.719	7	4
9	13	(Portugal) António Félix da Costa	Techeetah-DS	36	+15.304	19	2
10	48	(Switzerland) Edoardo Mortara	Venturi-Mercedes	36	+16.154	6	1
11	20	(New Zealand) Mitch Evans	Jaguar	36	+16.348	23	
12	28	(Germany) Maximilian Günther	Andretti-BMW	36	+17.798	18	
13	27	(United Kingdom) Alexander Sims	Andretti-BMW	36	+22.229	15	
14	36	(Germany) André Lotterer	Porsche	36	+23.893	20	
15	18	(Switzerland) Neel Jani	Porsche	36	+24.888	8	
16	19	(Brazil) Felipe Massa	Venturi-Mercedes	36	+25.577	11	
17	51	(United Kingdom) Tom Blomqvist	Jaguar	36	+25.992	12	
18	64	(Belgium) Jérôme d'Ambrosio	Mahindra	36	+30.485	16	
19	6	(Brazil) Sérgio Sette Câmara	Dragon-Penske	36	+31.453	9	
20	33	(Germany) Daniel Abt	NIO	36	+38.071	17	
21	3	(United Kingdom) Oliver Turvey	NIO	36	+39.694	13	
22	7	(Switzerland) Nico Müller	Dragon-Penske	36	+1:11.178	PL	
Ret	4	(Netherlands) Robin Frijns	Virgin-Audi	33	Puncture	5	
Ret	22	(United Kingdom) Oliver Rowland	e.dams-Nissan	25	Accident damage	24	

Notes:

- ^1 – Pole position.
- ^2 – Fastest in group stage.
- ^3 – Fastest Lap.

==== Standings after the race ====
Drivers' Championship standings

+/–	Pos	Driver	Points
	1	(Portugal) António Félix da Costa	158
7	2	(Belgium) Stoffel Vandoorne	87
	3	(France) Jean-Éric Vergne	86
4	4	(Switzerland) Sébastien Buemi	84
3	5	(United Kingdom) Oliver Rowland	83

Teams' Championship standings

+/–	Pos	Constructor	Points
	1	(China) Techeetah-DS	244
	2	(France) e.dams-Nissan	167
2	3	(Germany) Mercedes	147
	4	(United Kingdom) Virgin-Audi	121
2	5	(United States) Andretti-BMW	118

- Notes: Only the top five positions are included for both sets of standings.

== Notes ==
Previous race: 2020 Marrakesh ePrix	FIA Formula E Championship; 2019–20 season	Next race: 2021 Diriyah ePrix
Previous race: 2019 Berlin ePrix	Berlin ePrix	Next race: 2021 Berlin ePrix
