= 2019–20 Formula E Championship =

Electric car racing season

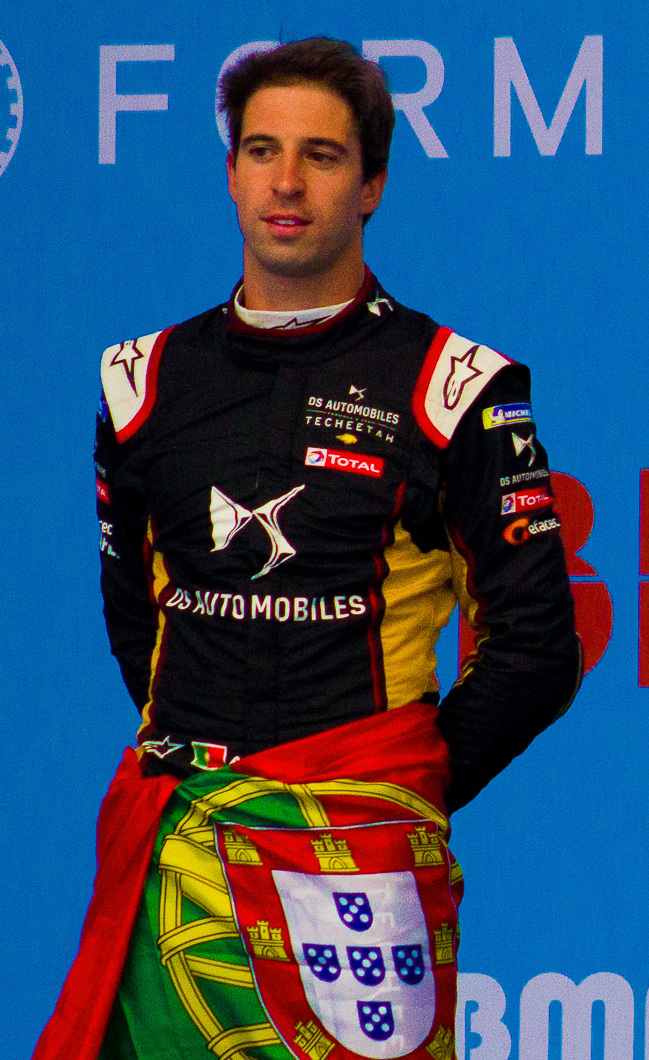
António Félix da Costa, the 2019-20 Champion.

The 2019–20 FIA Formula E Championship was the sixth season of the FIA Formula E championship, a motor racing championship for electrically powered vehicles recognised by motorsport's governing body, the Fédération Internationale de l'Automobile (FIA), as the highest class of competition for electric open-wheel racing cars.

On 13 March, Formula E and the FIA announced a temporary suspension of the season in response to the COVID-19 pandemic. During the suspension, Formula E organised an esports racing series called Formula E Race at Home Challenge. The season resumed and concluded in August with six races within nine days at the Tempelhof Airport Street Circuit.

The season's champion was António Félix da Costa who clinched his first title with two races left. DS Techeetah became team champions for the second time in a row.

== Teams and drivers ==
All teams used the Spark SRT05e chassis and Michelin all-weather tyres.

Team	Powertrain	No.	Drivers	Rounds
(United Kingdom) Envision Virgin Racing	Audi e-tron FE06	2	(United Kingdom) Sam Bird	All
(United Kingdom) Envision Virgin Racing	Audi e-tron FE06	4	(Netherlands) Robin Frijns	All
(China) Nio 333 FE Team	Nio FE-005 (Note: The powertrain is a rebadged Penske EV-3 used by GEOX Dragon in the 2018–19 season.) (Note: NIO keep their manufacturer status due to their new powertrain being homologated as such by the FIA in late August.)	3	(United Kingdom) Oliver Turvey	All
(China) Nio 333 FE Team	Nio FE-005	33	(China) Ma Qinghua	1–5
(China) Nio 333 FE Team	Nio FE-005	33	(Germany) Daniel Abt	6–11
(Germany) Mercedes-Benz EQ Formula E Team	Mercedes-Benz EQ Silver Arrow 01	5	(Belgium) Stoffel Vandoorne	All
(Germany) Mercedes-Benz EQ Formula E Team	Mercedes-Benz EQ Silver Arrow 01	17	(Netherlands) Nyck de Vries	All
(United States) GEOX Dragon	Penske EV-4	6	(New Zealand) Brendon Hartley	1–5
(United States) GEOX Dragon	Penske EV-4	6	(Brazil) Sérgio Sette Câmara	6–11
(United States) GEOX Dragon	Penske EV-4	7	(Switzerland) Nico Müller	All
(Germany) Audi Sport ABT Schaeffler Formula E Team	Audi e-tron FE06	11	(Brazil) Lucas di Grassi	All
(Germany) Audi Sport ABT Schaeffler Formula E Team	Audi e-tron FE06	66	(Germany) Daniel Abt	1–5
(Germany) Audi Sport ABT Schaeffler Formula E Team	Audi e-tron FE06	66	(Germany) René Rast	6–11
(China) DS Techeetah	DS E-TENSE FE20	13	(Portugal) António Félix da Costa	All
(China) DS Techeetah	DS E-TENSE FE20	25	(France) Jean-Éric Vergne	All
(Germany) TAG Heuer Porsche Formula E Team	Porsche 99X Electric	18	(Switzerland) Neel Jani	All
(Germany) TAG Heuer Porsche Formula E Team	Porsche 99X Electric	36	(Germany) André Lotterer	All
(Monaco) ROKiT Venturi Racing	Mercedes-Benz EQ Silver Arrow 01	19	(Brazil) Felipe Massa	All
(Monaco) ROKiT Venturi Racing	Mercedes-Benz EQ Silver Arrow 01	48	(Switzerland) Edoardo Mortara	All
(United Kingdom) Panasonic Jaguar Racing	Jaguar I-Type 4	20	(New Zealand) Mitch Evans	All
(United Kingdom) Panasonic Jaguar Racing	Jaguar I-Type 4	51	(United Kingdom) James Calado	1–9
(United Kingdom) Panasonic Jaguar Racing	Jaguar I-Type 4	51	(United Kingdom) Tom Blomqvist	10–11
(France) Nissan e.dams	Nissan IM02	22	(United Kingdom) Oliver Rowland	All
(France) Nissan e.dams	Nissan IM02	23	(Switzerland) Sébastien Buemi	All
(United States) BMW i Andretti Motorsport	BMW iFE.20	27	(United Kingdom) Alexander Sims	All
(United States) BMW i Andretti Motorsport	BMW iFE.20	28	(Germany) Maximilian Günther	All
(India) Mahindra Racing	Mahindra M6Electro	64	(Belgium) Jérôme d'Ambrosio	All
(India) Mahindra Racing	Mahindra M6Electro	94	(Germany) Pascal Wehrlein	1–5
(India) Mahindra Racing	Mahindra M6Electro	94	(United Kingdom) Alex Lynn	6–11

=== Free practice drivers ===
- James Rossiter replaced Jean-Éric Vergne in the first practice session of the Marrakesh ePrix after Vergne fell ill.

=== Team changes ===
- Porsche joined the grid as a new entry.
- The Mercedes-Benz EQ Formula E Team entered the championship while HWA, which had run customer Venturi powertrains as HWA Racelab in the previous season, are running Mercedes' trackside operations.
- Venturi switched to Mercedes powertrains, effectively ending their run as manufacturers.
- The Nio team was sold to Lisheng Racing, but will continue under the NIO brand. The team is not using its own powertrains and it instead acquired last year's powertrain from GEOX Dragon.

=== Driver changes ===
- Neel Jani returned to Formula E as a Porsche driver.
- André Lotterer moved from DS Techeetah to Porsche.
- Maximilian Günther moved from GEOX Dragon to BMW i Andretti Motorsport, replacing António Félix da Costa.
- António Félix da Costa moved from BMW i Andretti Motorsport to DS Techeetah, replacing Lotterer.
- 2019 Formula 2 Champion Nyck de Vries made his Formula E debut with the Mercedes-Benz EQ Formula E Team.
- GEOX Dragon signed two rookies, with 2015 and 2017 World Endurance Champion Brendon Hartley partnering Nico Müller.
- 2017 GT World Endurance champion James Calado made his debut with Jaguar, replacing Alex Lynn.
- Ma Qinghua returned to Formula E as a NIO 333 driver, replacing Tom Dillmann.

==== Mid-season changes ====
- Daniel Abt was suspended from Audi after the "Race At Home" eSports series race during the lockdown caused by the COVID-19 pandemic when it was discovered professional video gamer Lorenz Hörzing had taken his place. He was replaced by René Rast.
- Pascal Wehrlein left Mahindra Racing with immediate effect in June 2020. He was replaced by Alex Lynn.
- Ma Qinghua was unable to attend the final six races in Berlin due to COVID-19 travel restrictions. He was replaced by Abt.
- Brendon Hartley left GEOX Dragon team with immediate effect in July 2020. He was replaced by Sérgio Sette Câmara.
- James Calado missed the final two rounds with Jaguar and was replaced by Tom Blomqvist. Calado was already set to leave Jaguar Racing at the end of the season, having Sam Bird take his place.

== Calendar ==
The 2019–20 championship was due to be contested over fourteen rounds in Europe, Africa, Asia, the Middle East, North America, and South America. The layouts are on street circuits, except for the Mexico City ePrix - held on a permanent road course and the Berlin ePrix - held on the access roads of Tempelhof Airport.

Round	ePrix	Country	Circuit	Date
1	Diriyah ePrix	Saudi Arabia	Riyadh Street Circuit	22 November 2019
2	Diriyah ePrix	Saudi Arabia	Riyadh Street Circuit	23 November 2019
3	Santiago ePrix	Chile	Parque O'Higgins Circuit	18 January 2020
4	Mexico City ePrix	Mexico	Autódromo Hermanos Rodríguez	15 February 2020
5	Marrakesh ePrix	Morocco	Circuit International Automobile Moulay El Hassan	29 February 2020
6	Berlin ePrix	Germany	Tempelhof Airport Street Circuit (Note: Each pair of races used a different track configuration.)	5 August 2020
7	Berlin ePrix	Germany	Tempelhof Airport Street Circuit	6 August 2020
8	Berlin ePrix	Germany	Tempelhof Airport Street Circuit	8 August 2020
9	Berlin ePrix	Germany	Tempelhof Airport Street Circuit	9 August 2020
10	Berlin ePrix	Germany	Tempelhof Airport Street Circuit	12 August 2020
11	Berlin ePrix	Germany	Tempelhof Airport Street Circuit	13 August 2020
CAN	Sanya ePrix	China	Sanya Street Circuit	21 March 2020 (Note: The Sanya, Rome, Paris, Seoul, Jakarta, New York and London ePrix's were cancelled due to the COVID-19 pandemic.)
CAN	Rome ePrix	Italy	Circuito Cittadino dell'EUR	4 April 2020
CAN	Paris ePrix	France	Paris Street Circuit	18 April 2020
CAN	Seoul ePrix	South Korea	Seoul Street Circuit	3 May 2020
CAN	Jakarta ePrix	Indonesia	Jakarta National Monument Street Circuit	6 June 2020
CAN	New York City ePrix	United States	Brooklyn Street Circuit	11 July 2020
CAN	London ePrix	United Kingdom	ExCeL London (Note: The circuit was designed as an indoor-outdoor venue, combining the ExCeL facilities and the surrounding public roads at Royal Docks.)	25 July 2020
CAN	London ePrix	United Kingdom	ExCeL London	26 July 2020

=== ePrix locations ===
Location of non-European ePrix in season 6.
(held ePrix: cancelled ePrix)
Location of European ePrix in 2020.
(held ePrix: cancelled ePrix)

=== Calendar changes ===
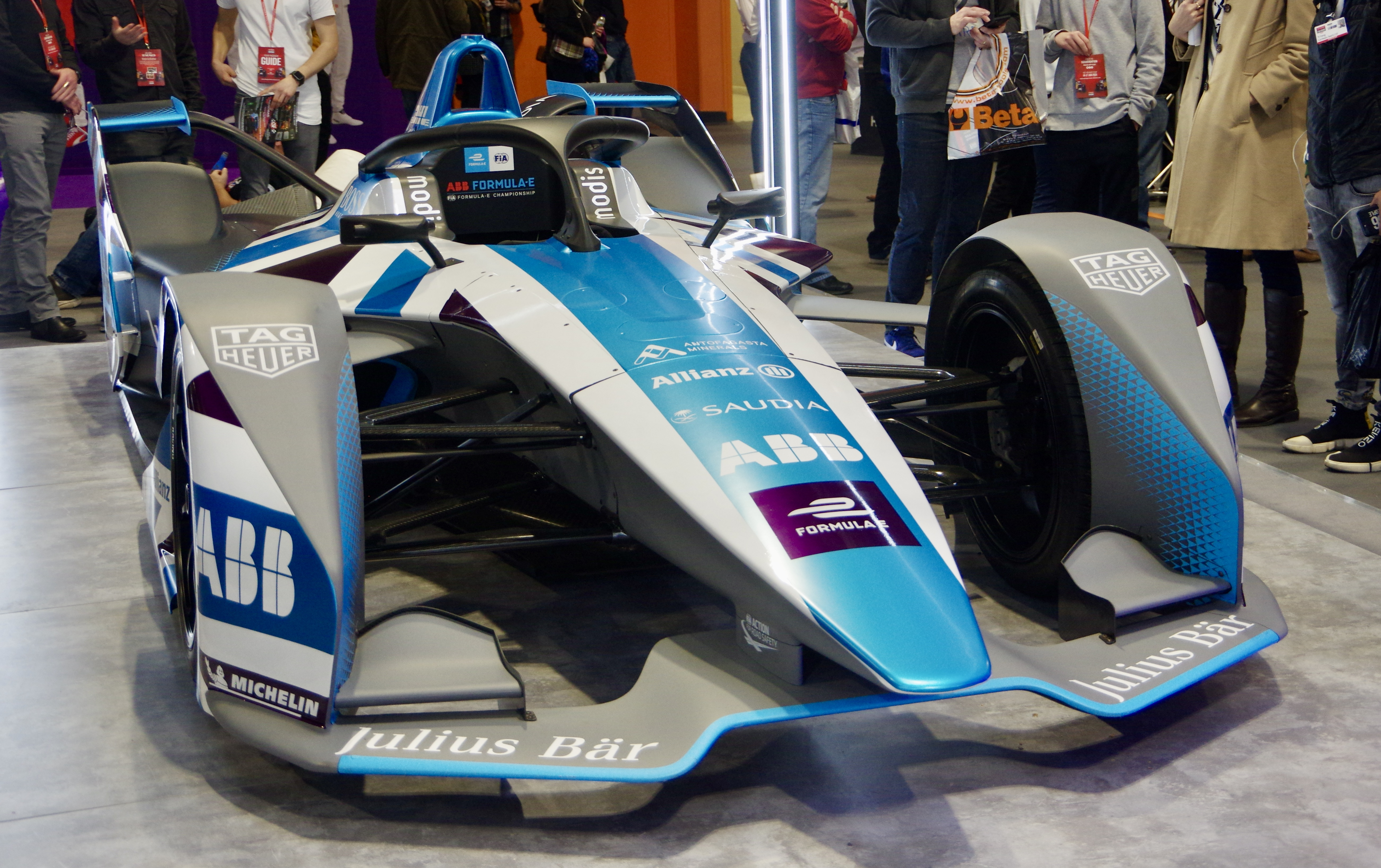
The Spark SRT05e demo car at the 2020 Autosport International promoting the returning London ePrix by sporting a modified, Union Jack-inspired livery.

Three ePrix were taken off of the calendar. The Swiss ePrix was taken off as the 2019 Swiss ePrix was run as a one-time event. The Monaco ePrix was removed from the calendar as the race only happens every other year. The Hong Kong ePrix was originally due to take place but it was replaced with the Marrakesh ePrix due to the 2019–20 Hong Kong protests. The season started a month earlier than the 2018–19 season - November instead of December - with the opening round, the Diriyah ePrix, taking place as a double-header with one race on the Friday and another on the Saturday.

The New York City, Paris, Rome, Sanya, London and the inaugural Jakarta and Seoul ePrix had been due to take place but were cancelled due to the COVID-19 pandemic. In their place six ePrix were scheduled across three different layouts at the Tempelhof Airport Street Circuit between 5–13 August.

== Regulation changes ==
=== Technical regulations ===
- The usage of twin motors was banned.
- The Attack Mode power was increased by 10 kW, from 225 kW to 235 kW.
- Drivers are no longer allowed to activate the Attack Mode during Full-Course Yellow and Safety Car periods.
- For each minute spent under Full Course Yellow or Safety Car conditions, 1 kWh is subtracted from the total available energy measured from the point at which the race was neutralised.

=== Sporting regulations ===
- During a race suspension, the countdown clock now stops, unless otherwise announced by the Race Director, with the aim of completing the full race time.
- The fastest driver in the group qualifying stage is awarded one championship point.

== Results and standings ==
=== ePrix ===
Round	Race	Qualifying		Race			Report
Round	Race	Group stage	Pole position	Fastest lap	Winning driver	Winning team	Report
1	(Saudi Arabia) Diriyah	(United Kingdom) Sam Bird	(United Kingdom) Alexander Sims	(Germany) Daniel Abt (Note: Daniel Abt set the fastest lap, but did not finish in the top 10, so was ineligible to be the point-scorer for the fastest lap. Mitch Evans was the point-scorer instead for setting the fastest lap of those finishing in the top 10.)	(United Kingdom) Sam Bird	(United Kingdom) Envision Virgin Racing	Report
2	(Saudi Arabia) Diriyah	(Portugal) António Félix da Costa	(United Kingdom) Alexander Sims	(Portugal) António Félix da Costa	(United Kingdom) Alexander Sims	(United States) BMW i Andretti Motorsport	Report
3	(Chile) Santiago	(New Zealand) Mitch Evans	(New Zealand) Mitch Evans	(United Kingdom) Oliver Rowland (Note: Oliver Rowland set the fastest lap, but did not finish in the top 10, so was ineligible to be the point-scorer for the fastest lap. Sam Bird was the point-scorer instead for setting the fastest lap of those finishing in the top 10.)	(Germany) Maximilian Günther	(United States) BMW i Andretti Motorsport	Report
4	Mexico City	(New Zealand) Mitch Evans	(Germany) André Lotterer	(United Kingdom) Alexander Sims	(New Zealand) Mitch Evans	(United Kingdom) Panasonic Jaguar Racing	Report
5	(Morocco) Marrakesh	(Germany) Maximilian Günther	(Portugal) António Félix da Costa	(Germany) Pascal Wehrlein (Note: Pascal Wehrlein set the fastest lap, but did not finish in the top 10, so was ineligible to be the point-scorer for the fastest lap. Mitch Evans was the point-scorer instead for setting the fastest lap of those finishing in the top 10.)	(Portugal) António Félix da Costa	(China) DS Techeetah	Report
6	(Germany) Berlin	(Portugal) António Félix da Costa	(Portugal) António Félix da Costa	(Portugal) António Félix da Costa	(Portugal) António Félix da Costa	(China) DS Techeetah	Report
7	(Germany) Berlin	(Switzerland) Sébastien Buemi	(Portugal) António Félix da Costa	(Belgium) Stoffel Vandoorne	(Portugal) António Félix da Costa	(China) DS Techeetah	Report
8	(Germany) Berlin	(France) Jean-Éric Vergne	(France) Jean-Éric Vergne	(New Zealand) Mitch Evans	(Germany) Maximilian Günther	(United States) BMW i Andretti Motorsport	Report
9	(Germany) Berlin	(France) Jean-Éric Vergne	(France) Jean-Éric Vergne	(United Kingdom) Sam Bird (Note: Sam Bird set the fastest lap, but did not finish in the top 10, so was ineligible to be the point-scorer for the fastest lap. António Félix da Costa was the point-scorer instead for setting the fastest lap of those finishing in the top 10.)	(France) Jean-Éric Vergne	(China) DS Techeetah	Report
10	(Germany) Berlin	(Germany) René Rast	(United Kingdom) Oliver Rowland	(Brazil) Lucas di Grassi (Note: Lucas di Grassi set the fastest lap, but did not finish in the top 10, so was ineligible to be the point-scorer for the fastest lap. Oliver Rowland was the point-scorer instead for setting the fastest lap of those finishing in the top 10.)	(United Kingdom) Oliver Rowland	(France) Nissan e.dams	Report
11	(Germany) Berlin	(Switzerland) Sébastien Buemi	(Belgium) Stoffel Vandoorne	(Switzerland) Nico Müller (Note: Nico Müller set the fastest lap, but did not finish in the top 10, so was ineligible to be the point-scorer for the fastest lap. Sam Bird was the point-scorer instead for setting the fastest lap of those finishing in the top 10.)	(Belgium) Stoffel Vandoorne	(Germany) Mercedes-Benz EQ Formula E Team	Report

=== Drivers' Championship ===
Points were awarded using the following structure:

Position	1st	2nd	3rd	4th	5th	6th	7th	8th	9th	10th	GS	Pole	FL
Points	25	18	15	12	10	8	6	4	2	1	1	3	1

Pos.	Driver	DIR (Saudi Arabia)		SCL (Chile)	MEX (Mexico)	MRK (Morocco)	BER (Germany)		BER (Germany)		BER (Germany)		Pts
1	(Portugal) António Félix da Costa	14*	10^{G}*	2*	2*	**1***	**1**^{G}*	**1***	4*	2*	Ret*	9*	158
2	(Belgium) Stoffel Vandoorne	3*	3*	6*	NC*	15*	6*	5*	Ret*	12*	9*	**1***	87
3	(France) Jean-Éric Vergne	Ret	8	Ret	4	3	NC	10	**3**^{G}	**1**^{G}	18	7	86
4	(Switzerland) Sébastien Buemi	Ret*	12*	13	3	4	7	2^{G}	11	3	10	3^{G}	84
5	(United Kingdom) Oliver Rowland	4	5	17	7	9	14	7	6	5	**1**	Ret	83
6	(Brazil) Lucas di Grassi	13	2	7*	6*	7*	8	3	8*	6*	21	6*	77
7	(New Zealand) Mitch Evans	10	18	**3**^{G}	1^{G}	6	13	12*	9	7	7*	11	71
8	(Germany) André Lotterer	2*	14*	DSQ	**Ret***	8	2	9	5*	8	4*	14	71
9	(Germany) Maximilian Günther	18	11	1	11	2^{G}	DSQ	Ret*	1	Ret*	Ret	12	69
10	(United Kingdom) Sam Bird	1^{G}	Ret	10	Ret	10	3	6	13	11	20	5	63
11	(Netherlands) Nyck de Vries	6*	16*	5*	Ret*	11	4	Ret*	18	4	14	2*	60
12	(Netherlands) Robin Frijns	5	Ret	15	DSQ	12	Ret	4	2	DNS	2	Ret	58
13	(United Kingdom) Alexander Sims	**8**	**1**	Ret	5	Ret	9	19	10	13	11	13	49
14	(Switzerland) Edoardo Mortara	7	4	Ret	8	5	17	8	14	14	8	10	41
15	(Germany) René Rast						10*	13	Ret	16	3^{G}	4	29
16	(Belgium) Jérôme d'Ambrosio	9	DNS	NC	10	13*	5	DSQ	7	15	16	18	19
17	(United Kingdom) Alex Lynn						12	11	17	9	5	8	16
18	(Germany) Pascal Wehrlein	11	15	4	9	22*							14
19	(United Kingdom) James Calado	16	7	8	DSQ	16	15	20	Ret	17			10
20	(Switzerland) Neel Jani	17	13	Ret	14	18	11	15	Ret	19	6	15	8
21	(Germany) Daniel Abt	Ret	6	14*	Ret	14	18*	16*	15*	18*	Ret*	20*	8
22	(Brazil) Felipe Massa	12	17	9	Ret	17	Ret	NC	19	10	13	16	3
23	(New Zealand) Brendon Hartley	19	9	Ret	12	19							2
24	(United Kingdom) Oliver Turvey	15	DSQ	11	13	21	16	18	16	22	19	21	0
25	(Switzerland) Nico Müller	DNS	Ret	12	Ret	20	NC	14	12	20	17	22	0
26	(United Kingdom) Tom Blomqvist										12	17	0
27	(Brazil) Sérgio Sette Câmara						DSQ*	17	Ret	21	15	19	0
28	(China) Ma Qinghua	20	19	16	Ret	23							0
Pos.	Driver	DIR (Saudi Arabia)		SCL (Chile)	MEX (Mexico)	MRK (Morocco)	BER (Germany)		BER (Germany)		BER (Germany)		Pts

Colour	Result
Gold	Winner
Silver	Second place
Bronze	Third place
Green	Points classification
Blue	Non-points classification
Blue	Non-classified finish (NC)
Purple	Retired, not classified (Ret)
Red	Did not qualify (DNQ)
Red	Did not pre-qualify (DNPQ)
Black	Disqualified (DSQ)
White	Did not start (DNS)
White	Withdrew (WD)
White	Race cancelled (C)
Blank	Did not practice (DNP)
Blank	Did not arrive (DNA)
Blank	Excluded (EX)

**Bold** – Pole
Italics – Fastest lap
^{G} – Fastest in group stage
* – FanBoost

=== Teams' Championship ===
Pos.	Team	No.	DIR (Saudi Arabia)		SCL (Chile)	MEX (Mexico)	MRK (Morocco)	BER (Germany)		BER (Germany)		BER (Germany)		Pts
1	(China) DS Techeetah	13	14	10^{G}	2	2	**1**	**1**^{G}	**1**	4	2	Ret	9	244
1	(China) DS Techeetah	25	Ret	8	Ret	4	3	NC	10	**3**^{G}	**1**^{G}	18	7	244
2	(France) Nissan e.dams	22	4	5	17	7	9	14	7	6	5	**1**	Ret	167
2	(France) Nissan e.dams	23	Ret	12	13	3	4	7	2^{G}	11	3	10	3^{G}	167
3	(Germany) Mercedes-Benz EQ Formula E Team	5	3	3	6	NC	15	6	5	Ret	12	9	**1**	147
3	(Germany) Mercedes-Benz EQ Formula E Team	17	6	16	5	Ret	11	4	Ret	18	4	14	2	147
4	(United Kingdom) Envision Virgin Racing	2	1^{G}	Ret	10	Ret	10	3	6	13	11	20	5	121
4	(United Kingdom) Envision Virgin Racing	4	5	Ret	15	DSQ	12	Ret	4	2	DNS	2	Ret	121
5	(United States) BMW i Andretti Motorsport	27	**8**	**1**	Ret	5	Ret	9	19	10	13	11	13	118
5	(United States) BMW i Andretti Motorsport	28	18	11	1	11	2^{G}	DSQ	Ret	1	Ret	Ret	12	118
6	(Germany) Audi Sport ABT Schaeffler	11	13	2	7	6	7	8	3	8	6	21	6	114
6	(Germany) Audi Sport ABT Schaeffler	66	Ret	6	14	Ret	14	10	13	Ret	16	3^{G}	4	114
7	(United Kingdom) Panasonic Jaguar Racing	20	10	18	**3**^{G}	1^{G}	6	13	12	9	7	7	11	81
7	(United Kingdom) Panasonic Jaguar Racing	51	16	7	8	DSQ	16	15	20	Ret	17	12	17	81
8	(Germany) TAG Heuer Porsche Formula E Team	18	17	13	Ret	14	18	11	15	Ret	19	6	15	79
8	(Germany) TAG Heuer Porsche Formula E Team	36	2	14	DSQ	**Ret**	8	2	9	5	8	4	14	79
9	(India) Mahindra Racing	64	9	DNS	NC	10	13	5	DSQ	7	15	16	18	49
9	(India) Mahindra Racing	94	11	15	4	9	22	12	11	17	9	5	8	49
10	(Monaco) ROKiT Venturi Racing	19	12	17	9	Ret	17	Ret	NC	19	10	13	16	44
10	(Monaco) ROKiT Venturi Racing	48	7	4	Ret	8	5	17	8	14	14	8	10	44
11	(United States) GEOX Dragon	6	19	9	Ret	12	19	DSQ	17	Ret	21	15	19	2
11	(United States) GEOX Dragon	7	DNS	Ret	12	Ret	20	NC	14	12	20	17	22	2
12	(China) Nio 333 FE Team	3	15	DSQ	11	13	21	16	18	16	22	19	21	0
12	(China) Nio 333 FE Team	33	20	19	16	Ret	23	18	16	15	18	Ret	20	0
Pos.	Team	No.	DIR (Saudi Arabia)		SCL (Chile)	MEX (Mexico)	MRK (Morocco)	BER (Germany)		BER (Germany)		BER (Germany)		Pts
