= 2020 Mexico City ePrix =

Race 4 of 11 of the 2019–20 Formula E season
← Previous race	Next race →

Race details
- Date: 15 February 2020
- Official name: 2020 CBMM Niobium Mexico City E-Prix
- Location: Autódromo Hermanos Rodríguez, Mexico City
- Course: Permanent racing facility
- Course length: 2.606 km (1.619 mi)
- Distance: 36 laps, 93.816 km (58.295 mi)
- Weather: Dry
- Attendance: 41,000 (Foro Sol)

Pole position
Driver	(Germany) André Lotterer	Porsche
- Time: 1:07.922

Fastest lap
Driver	(United Kingdom) Alexander Sims	Andretti-BMW
- Time: 1:10.520 on lap 31

Podium
First	(New Zealand) Mitch Evans	Jaguar
Second	(Portugal) António Félix da Costa	Techeetah-DS
Third	(Switzerland) Sébastien Buemi	e.dams-Nissan

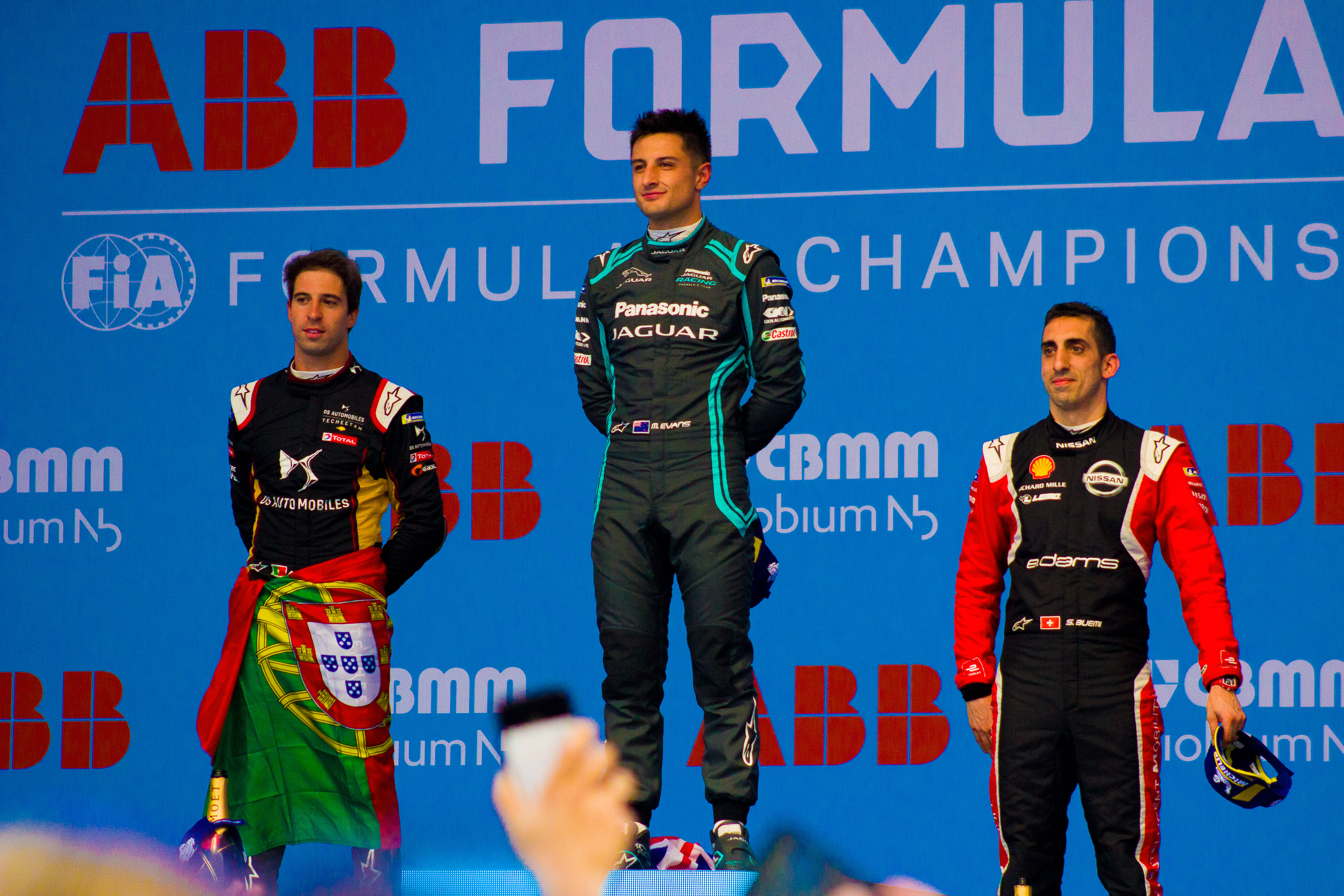
Mitch Evans (center) scored his second Formula E victory, António Félix da Costa (left) finished second and Sébastien Buemi (right) scored his first podium finish of the season.

The 2020 Mexico City ePrix (formally the 2020 CBMM Niobium Mexico City E-Prix) was a Formula E electric car race held at the Autódromo Hermanos Rodríguez in the center of Mexico City on 15 February 2020. It served as the fourth round of the 2019–20 Formula E season and was the fifth edition of the event as part of the championship. The race was won by Mitch Evans, who had started from second on the grid, with António Félix da Costa coming in second behind him, while Sébastien Buemi came in third.

Following his race win, Mitch Evans took the lead of the driver's championship, with 47 points, to edge out Alexander Sims by 1 point in the standings, while da Costa's second consecutive podium brought him up to third in the standings, with 39 points. Owing to him crashing out of the race, then-championship leader Stoffel Vandoorne fell to fourth in the standings, with 38 points. Lucas di Grassi's 6th place finish was sufficient to keep him in the top 5, with 32 points.

== Report ==
=== Background ===
On 15 June 2019, Formula E announced the provisional calendar for the 2019–20 Formula E season, which would be the sixth season of the championship, with 14 races to be held across 12 cities globally. On this provisional calendar, the Mexico City ePrix was planned as the 5th round of the championship.

On 5 October 2019, Formula E announced the finalised calendar for the season, which would see 14 races to be held across 12 cities globally. This finalised calendar would see the race bumped up to the 4th round of the championship, with the TBA round in December being cancelled.

Ahead of the start of the race weekend, it was revealed that Mahindra Racing's drivers, Pascal Wehrlein and Jérôme d'Ambrosio had both been given 40 place grid-penalties, after the team opted to introduce new gearboxes for both cars, breaching Articles 28.4 and 28.5 of the 2019/2020 FIA Formula E Championship Sporting Regulations, relegating both drivers to the back of the grid. Owing to the size of this penalty, an additional punishment during the race will be enforced, although the severity of the added penalty will be dependent on the amount of grid positions conceded. Should both drivers qualify inside the top four, they would only receive a drive-through penalty, while anything lower would result in a 10-second stop-go penalty.

==== Track changes ====
On 18 January 2020, Autosport published an article that revealed changes to the Mexico City track for the 2020 Mexico City ePrix, the change having previously been hinted at, due to the event being marked as "subject to circuit homologation" from the FIA when Formula E's 2019–20 calendar was first announced in June 2019. This was understood to be due to the length of the circuit needing to be increased as grid increased to 24 cars from the start of this season, following Porsche's entry into the electric championship. On January 28 2020, this change was confirmed, with it being announced that the race was to take place on a lengthened, 2.592km layout without chicanes.

A new section, consisting of five new corners, would be added after Turn 2, including a sweeping right-hander, before the cars would enter the back straight, with the chicane eliminated, giving drivers a clear run into Foro Sol stadium section, which had been left unaltered, following which, the cars would enter the final corner of the track, the Peraltada, now a sweeping 180 degree turn, with the chicane being removed.

=== Qualifying ===
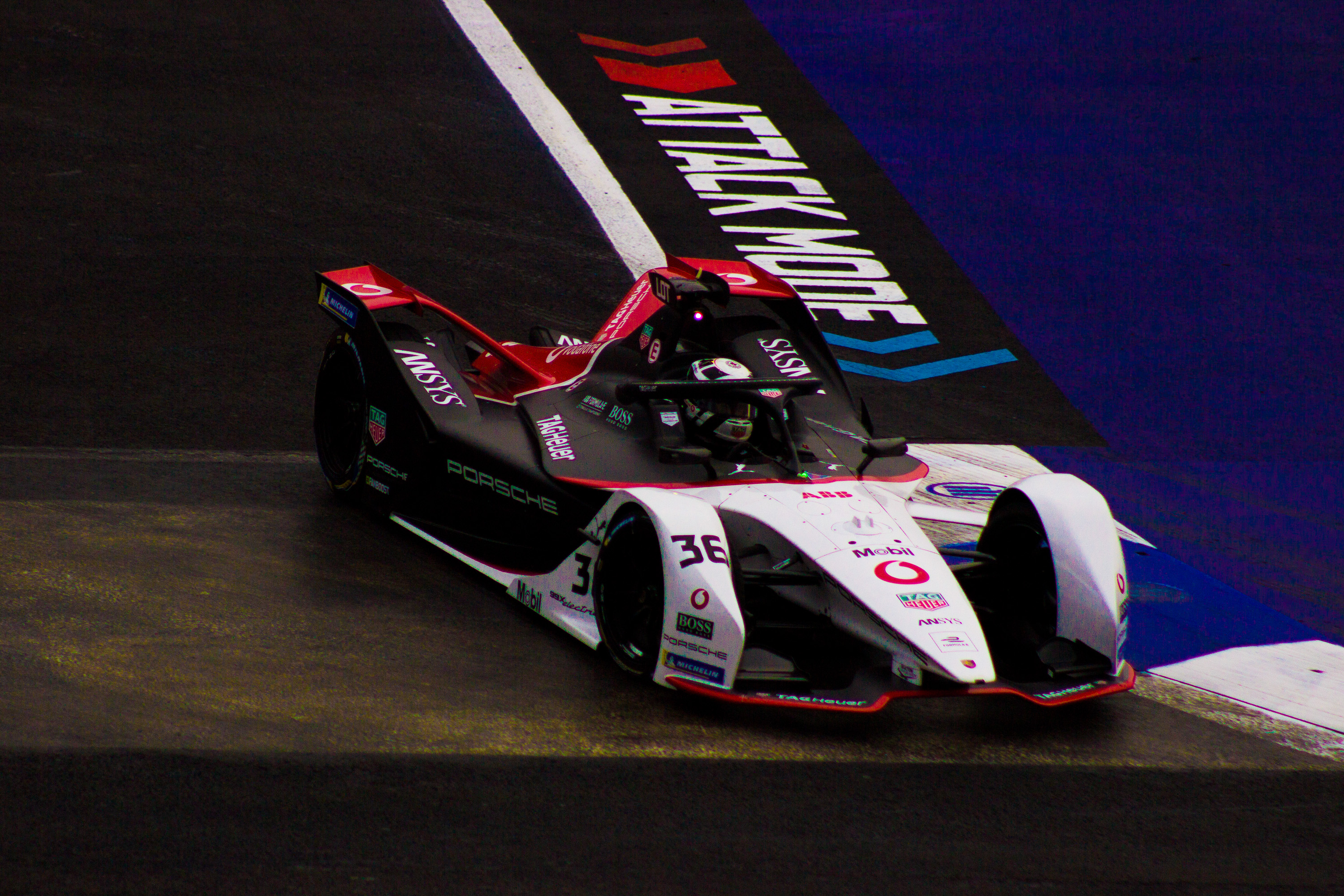
André Lotterer scored his second and Porsche's first pole position.

Sam Bird dominated Group 1 with the time of 1:08.346, which allowed him to qualify for Superpole from sixth place. Group 2 saw Mitch Evans post a time of 1:08.174, which was the fastest time of group stage, earning Evans one championship point. Nyck de Vries, Pascal Wehrlein and André Lotterer have also qualified for Superpole, making it four drivers out of six from Group 2 to have made it to Superpole. Group 3 only featured five drivers as Daniel Abt did not take part in it due to a crash in Free Practice 1. Robin Frijns was the fastest driver in the group, but did not make it into Superpole, his time was only seventh best. Sébastien Buemi from Group 4 was the final Superpole qualifier, posting a time of 1:08.363 which was enough for a fifth place in group stage. Oliver Turvey had a technical issue, which prevented him from posting a representative lap time.

Bird was the first to go on track in Superpole as he qualified from sixth place. Bird posted a slower time compared to the one he posted in group stage, his time of 1:08.444 was also the slowest in Superpole, making him start from third row on the grid. Buemi went on next, posting a nearly identical time compared to his group stage outing, which was once again enough for fifth place. Wehrlein then posted a lap time of 1:08.200, taking the provisional lead. Lotterer then followed with a lap of 1:07.922, beating Wehrlein's time. This time would later prove to be the best one as de Vries and Evans both failed to improve on it.

The final starting grid would see some changes. De Vries would move to second row after Wehrlein was moved the back of the grid (along with the other Mahindra driver Jérôme d'Ambrosio), making almost the entire grid move up a position. Abt and Turvey also had to start from the back of the grid, though ahead of Mahindra drivers.

=== Race ===
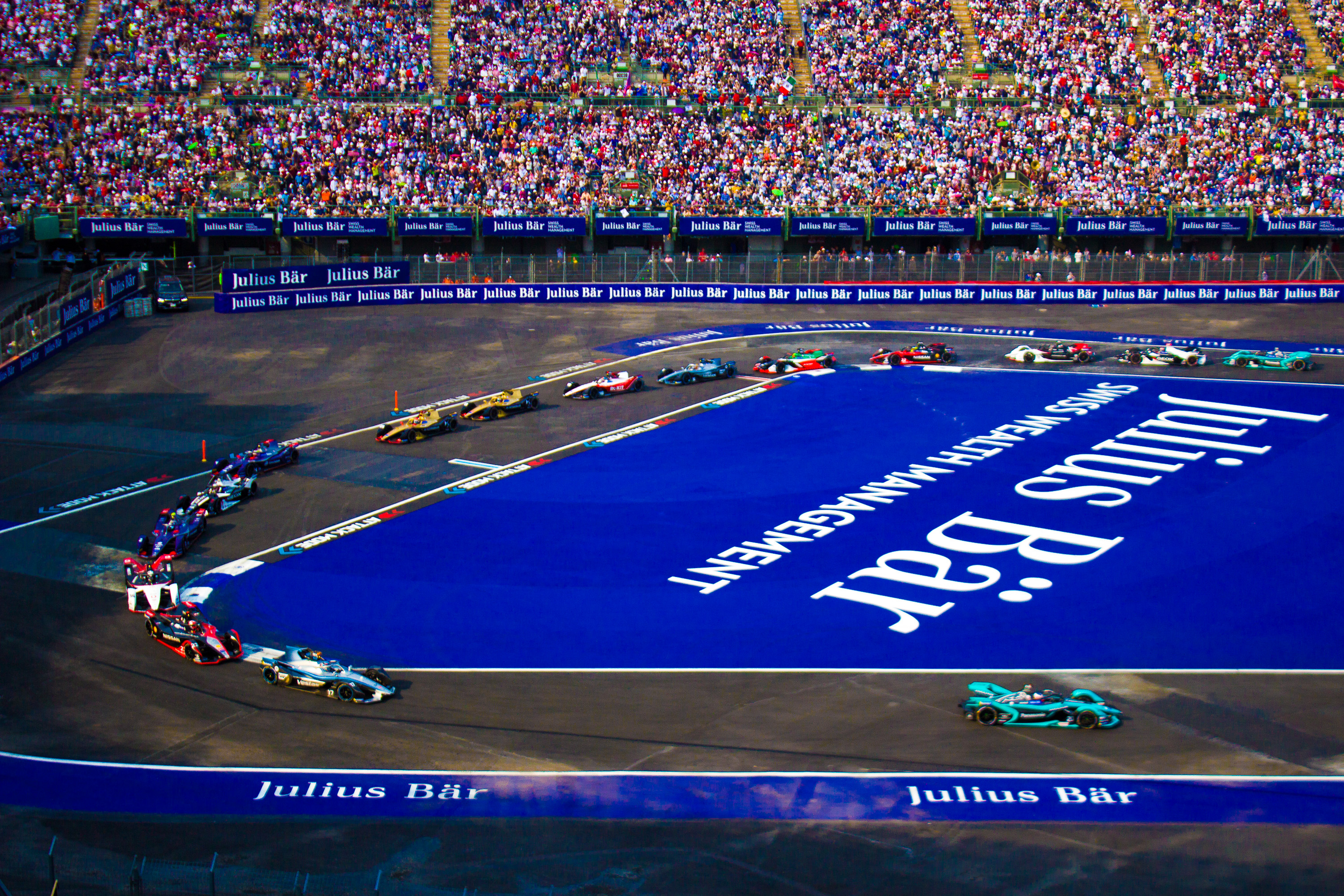
The opening lap saw Evans getting into the lead and creating a gap that would last for the entire race.

Lotterer started the race from pole alongside Evans, who locked up into the first corner. This pushed Lotterer wide as Evans was on the inside. Lotterer fell back into fourth place, but would quickly grab a place to move up to third. On lap 3, Nico Müller brought out the safety car after he hit the outside wall surrounding the first corner. This allowed both Mahindra drivers to get back in contention after they were given additional penalties (stop-and-go for D'Ambrosio and a drive-through for Wehrlein). The safety car phase ended at the end of lap 5. Evans, Buemi, Lotterer, Bird and Frijns made up the top 5 at the restart, though Lotterer would soon lose three places to Bird, Frijns and de Vries.

On lap 7, Felipe Massa hit the same wall as Müller, but was able to park the car in a safe spot and his retirement did not affect the race. Few laps later, Lotterer clipped a wall on the exit of turn 3, which stuck an advertising banner into the bodywork of his car, which created a cloud of smoke behind him. The bodywork eventually fell off, but the car was already damaged, which forced Lotterer to pit and subsequently retire from the race. Another incident happened on lap 19 and it involved Nyck de Vries, who tried to defend from António Félix da Costa. De Vries used FanBoost on the main straight and could not brake into the first corner, hitting Frijns in the process. Frijns was able to continue, de Vries was not.

Ma Qinghua would be the next one to retire, crashing at turn 3. Meanwhile in the front, Jean-Éric Vergne would battle his teammate da Costa, in an attempt to overtake Buemi, which was the goal Techeetah were trying to accomplish. Da Costa would eventually stay ahead of Vergne and would soon overtake Buemi himself, moving up to third place. Daniel Abt would retire in pits after he spun at turn 1 on lap 29. Da Costa would then go on to chase Bird, who would later crash while in attack mode phase at turn 3 during lap 32. Bird got back going, but crashed again in Foro Sol, where he stayed parked for the rest of the race. Stoffel Vandoorne would also hit the barriers on the penultimate lap, eventually finishing the race a lap down with a severely damaged car. Vandoorne was not classified in the results, despite crossing the finish line while pitting.

Evans won the 36-lap race, followed by da Costa and Buemi. Vergne, Alexander Sims (who also had the fastest lap of the race), Lucas di Grassi, Oliver Rowland, Edoardo Mortara, Werhlein and d'Ambrosio completed the list of points finishers. James Calado originally finished ninth, but was later disqualified, so was Frijns, who finished twelfth.

== Classification ==
=== Qualifying ===
Group draw
Group 1	(Belgium) VAN (1)	(United Kingdom) SIM (2)	(United Kingdom) BIR (3)	(Germany) GUE (4)	(Brazil) DIG (5)	(United Kingdom) ROW (6)
Group 2	(Portugal) DAC (7)	(New Zealand) EVA (8)	(Germany) LOT (9)	(Switzerland) MOR (10)	(Netherlands) DEV (11)	(Germany) WEH (12)
Group 3	(Netherlands) FRI (13)	(United Kingdom) CAL (14)	(Germany) ABT (15)	(France) JEV (16)	(Brazil) MAS (17)	(Belgium) DAM (18)
Group 4	(New Zealand) HAR (19)	(United Kingdom) TUR (20)	(Switzerland) BUE (21)	(Switzerland) MUL (22)	(Switzerland) JAN (23)	(China) QMA (24)

Pos.	No.	Driver	Team	GS	SP	Grid
1	36	(Germany) André Lotterer	Porsche	1:08.346	**1:07.922**	1
2	20	(New Zealand) Mitch Evans	Jaguar	**1:08.174**	1:07.985	2
3	94	(Germany) Pascal Wehrlein	Mahindra	1:08.362	1:08.200	24^{1}
4	17	(Netherlands) Nyck de Vries	Mercedes	1:08.294	1:08.214	3
5	23	(Switzerland) Sébastien Buemi	e.dams-Nissan	1:08.363	1:08.364	4
6	2	(United Kingdom) Sam Bird	Virgin-Audi	1:08.394	1:08.444	5
7	4	(Netherlands) Robin Frijns	Virgin-Audi	1:08.435	—N/a	6
8	7	(Switzerland) Nico Müller	Dragon-Penske	1:08.479	—N/a	7
9	25	(France) Jean-Éric Vergne	Techeetah-DS	1:08.496	—N/a	8
10	13	(Portugal) António Félix da Costa	Techeetah-DS	1:08.540	—N/a	9
11	5	(Belgium) Stoffel Vandoorne	Mercedes	1:08.636	—N/a	10
12	48	(Switzerland) Edoardo Mortara	Venturi-Mercedes	1:08.661	—N/a	11
13	22	(United Kingdom) Oliver Rowland	e.dams-Nissan	1:08.726	—N/a	12
14	64	(Belgium) Jérôme d'Ambrosio	Mahindra	1:08.788	—N/a	23^{1}
15	6	(New Zealand) Brendon Hartley	Dragon-Penske	1:08.878	—N/a	13
16	18	(Switzerland) Neel Jani	Porsche	1:08.880	—N/a	14
17	11	(Brazil) Lucas di Grassi	Audi	1:08.998	—N/a	15
18	28	(Germany) Maximilian Günther	Andretti-BMW	1:09.098	—N/a	16
19	51	(United Kingdom) James Calado	Jaguar	1:09.331	—N/a	17
20	27	(United Kingdom) Alexander Sims	Andretti-BMW	1:09.376	—N/a	18
21	19	(Brazil) Felipe Massa	Venturi-Mercedes	1:09.450	—N/a	19
22	33	(China) Ma Qinghua	NIO	1:10.176	—N/a	20
NC	3	(United Kingdom) Oliver Turvey	NIO	2:10.061	—N/a	21^{2}
NC	66	(Germany) Daniel Abt	Audi	no time	—N/a	22^{3}

Notes:

- **^1** – Both Mahindra drivers received 40-place grid penalties for changing gearboxes twice. As the drivers could not fulfill the full drop of 40 positions, Jérôme d'Ambrosio was handed an additional ten-second stop-and-go penalty at the start of the race, while Pascal Wehrlein only received a drive-through penalty, as he could be dropped by at least the minimum of 20 positions, which he accomplished by qualifying third.
- **^2** – Oliver Turvey's car suffered a technical failure during the qualifying session. The Stewards gave him the permission to start the race from the back of the grid.
- **^3** – Daniel Abt did not take part in the session due to ongoing repairs to his car following a crash in Free Practice 1. The Stewards gave him the permission to start the race from the back of the grid.

=== Race ===
Drivers who scored points are denoted in bold.

Pos.	No.	Driver	Team	Laps	Time/Retired	Grid	Points
1	**20**	**(New Zealand) Mitch Evans**	**Jaguar**	**36**	**46:42.093**	**2**	25+1^{2}
2	**13**	**(Portugal) António Félix da Costa**	**Techeetah-DS**	**36**	**+4.271**	**9**	18
3	**23**	**(Switzerland) Sébastien Buemi**	**e.dams-Nissan**	**36**	**+6.181**	**4**	15
4	**25**	**(France) Jean-Éric Vergne**	**Techeetah-DS**	**36**	**+14.331**	**8**	12
5	**27**	**(United Kingdom) Alexander Sims**	**Andretti-BMW**	**36**	**+19.244**	**18**	10+1^{3}
6	**11**	**(Brazil) Lucas di Grassi**	**Audi**	**36**	**+28.346**	**15**	8
7	**22**	**(United Kingdom) Oliver Rowland**	**e.dams-Nissan**	**36**	**+29.750**	**12**	6
8	**48**	**(Switzerland) Edoardo Mortara**	**Venturi-Mercedes**	**36**	**+30.204**	**11**	4
9	**94**	**(Germany) Pascal Wehrlein**	**Mahindra**	**36**	**+31.132**	**24**	2
10	**64**	**(Belgium) Jérôme d'Ambrosio**	**Mahindra**	**36**	**+32.818**	**23**	1
11	28	(Germany) Maximilian Günther	Andretti-BMW	36	+35.512	16	
12	6	(New Zealand) Brendon Hartley	Dragon-Penske	36	+36.399	13	
13	3	(United Kingdom) Oliver Turvey	NIO	36	+50.888	21	
14	18	(Switzerland) Neel Jani	Porsche	36	+1:04.891	14	
NC	5	(Belgium) Stoffel Vandoorne	Mercedes	35	+1 lap	10	
Ret	2	(United Kingdom) Sam Bird	Virgin-Audi	31	Accident	5	
Ret	66	(Germany) Daniel Abt	Audi	30	Retired in pits	22	
Ret	33	(China) Ma Qinghua	NIO	25	Accident	20	
Ret	17	(Netherlands) Nyck de Vries	Mercedes	18	Brakes	3	
Ret	**36**	**(Germany) André Lotterer**	**Porsche**	**11**	**Collision damage**	**1**	3^{4}
Ret	19	(Brazil) Felipe Massa	Venturi-Mercedes	6	Accident	19	
Ret	7	(Switzerland) Nico Müller	Dragon-Penske	2	Accident	7	
DSQ^{1}	51	(United Kingdom) James Calado	Jaguar	36	Energy usage	17	
DSQ^{1}	4	(Netherlands) Robin Frijns	Virgin-Audi	36	Energy usage	6	

Notes:

- **^1** – James Calado (who originally finished ninth) and Robin Frijns (who finished twelfth) were both disqualified from the race due to their energy used being over regulatory limit.
- **^2** – Fastest in group stage.
- **^3** – Fastest lap.
- **^4** – Pole position.

== Standings after the race ==
Drivers' Championship standings

+/–	Pos	Driver	Points
7	1	(New Zealand) Mitch Evans	47
	2	(United Kingdom) Alexander Sims	46 (–1)
4	3	(Portugal) António Félix da Costa	39 (–8)
3	4	(Belgium) Stoffel Vandoorne	38 (–9)
	5	(Brazil) Lucas di Grassi	32 (–15)

Teams' Championship standings

+/–	Pos	Constructor	Points
	1	(United States) Andretti-BMW	71
3	2	(United Kingdom) Jaguar	57 (–14)
1	3	(Germany) Mercedes	56 (–15)
2	4	(China) Techeetah-DS	55 (–16)
2	5	(France) e.dams-Nissan	43 (–28)

- Notes: Only the top five positions are included for both sets of standings.

Previous race: 2020 Santiago ePrix	FIA Formula E Championship; 2019–20 season	Next race: 2020 Marrakesh ePrix
Previous race: 2019 Mexico City ePrix	Mexico City ePrix	Next race: 2022 Mexico City ePrix
