= 2020 Marrakesh ePrix =

Race 5 of 11 of the 2019–20 Formula E season
← Previous race	Next race →

Race details
- Date: 29 February 2020
- Official name: 2020 ABB Formula E Marrakesh E-Prix
- Location: Circuit International Automobile Moulay El Hassan, Marrakesh
- Course: Semi-permanent street circuit
- Course length: 2.971 km (1.846 mi)
- Distance: 34 laps, 101.014 km (62.767 mi)
- Weather: Sunny

Pole position
Driver	(Portugal) António Félix da Costa	Techeetah-DS
- Time: 1:17.158

Fastest lap
Driver	(Germany) Pascal Wehrlein (New Zealand) Mitch Evans (Note: Evans received the point for fastest lap as Wehrlein failed to finish inside the top 10.)	Mahindra; Jaguar
- Time: 1:20.345 (1:20.737) on lap 29 (27)

Podium
First	(Portugal) António Félix da Costa	Techeetah-DS
Second	(Germany) Maximilian Günther	Andretti-BMW
Third	(France) Jean-Éric Vergne	Techeetah-DS

The 2020 Marrakesh ePrix was a Formula E electric car race held at Circuit International Automobile Moulay El Hassan in Marrakesh on 29 February 2020. The race was a replacement for the 2020 Hong Kong ePrix, which was cancelled due to pro-democracy protests.

== Report ==
=== Background ===
On 15 June 2019, Formula E announced the provisional calendar for the 2019–20 season, in which Marrakesh was not included. The final calendar, which was revealed in October, saw multiple date changes with Marrakesh coming in to replace Hong Kong. Marrakesh would also host the third annual rookie test a day after the event, where each team got to nominate two drivers who have not officially competed in the series.

=== Schedule changes ===
Free Practice 1 was moved to Friday afternoon due low visibility issues from sunrise during the first practice session in last year's event. The 2020 race held 47 days later on the calendar (February 29) compared to the 2019 race (January 12), an earlier sunrise and later sunset in late February compared to early January.

=== Rookie Test ===
The traditional rookie test took place the day after the race.

== Classification ==
=== Qualifying ===
Group draw
Group 1	(New Zealand) EVA (1)	(United Kingdom) SIM (2)	(Portugal) DAC (3)	(Belgium) VAN (4)	(Brazil) DIG (5)	(United Kingdom) BIR (6)
Group 2	(United Kingdom) ROW (7)	(Germany) GUE (8)	(Switzerland) MOR (9)	(Germany) LOT (10)	(Netherlands) DEV (11)	(France) JEV (12)
Group 3	(Switzerland) BUE (13)	(Germany) WEH (14)	(Netherlands) FRI (15)	(United Kingdom) CAL (16)	(Germany) ABT (17)	(Belgium) DAM (18)
Group 4	(Brazil) MAS (19)	(New Zealand) HAR (20)	(United Kingdom) TUR (21)	(Switzerland) MUL (22)	(Switzerland) JAN (23)	(China) QMA (24)

Pos.	No.	Driver	Team	GS	SP	Grid
1	13	(Portugal) António Félix da Costa	Techeetah-DS	1:17.640	**1:17.158**	1
2	28	(Germany) Maximilian Günther	Andretti-BMW	**1:17.562**	1:17.227	2
3	36	(Germany) André Lotterer	Porsche	1:17.582	1:17.253	3
4	17	(Netherlands) Nyck de Vries	Mercedes	1:17.743	1:17.590	4
5	48	(Switzerland) Edoardo Mortara	Venturi-Mercedes	1:17.631	1:17.803	5
6	23	(Switzerland) Sébastien Buemi	e.dams-Nissan	1:17.779	1:17.811	6
7	64	(Belgium) Jérôme d'Ambrosio	Mahindra	1:17.798	—N/a	7
8	27	(United Kingdom) Alexander Sims	Andretti-BMW	1:17.830	—N/a	8
9	22	(United Kingdom) Oliver Rowland	e.dams-Nissan	1:17.839	—N/a	9
10	51	(United Kingdom) James Calado	Jaguar	1:17.867	—N/a	10
11	25	(France) Jean-Éric Vergne	Techeetah-DS	1:17.928	—N/a	11
12	6	(New Zealand) Brendon Hartley	Dragon-Penske	1:17.944	—N/a	12
13	11	(Brazil) Lucas di Grassi	Audi	1:17.958	—N/a	13
14	2	(United Kingdom) Sam Bird	Virgin-Audi	1:18.064	—N/a	14
15	94	(Germany) Pascal Wehrlein	Mahindra	1:18.069	—N/a	15
16	7	(Switzerland) Nico Müller	Dragon-Penske	1:18.203	—N/a	16
17	5	(Belgium) Stoffel Vandoorne	Mercedes	1:18.218	—N/a	17
18	66	(Germany) Daniel Abt	Audi	1:18.229	—N/a	18
19	3	(United Kingdom) Oliver Turvey	NIO	1:18.313	—N/a	19
20	19	(Brazil) Felipe Massa	Venturi-Mercedes	1:18.675	—N/a	20
21	33	(China) Ma Qinghua	NIO	1:19.359	—N/a	21
NC	4	(Netherlands) Robin Frijns	Virgin-Audi	1:27.444^{1}	—N/a	22
NC	18	(Switzerland) Neel Jani	Porsche	1:32.690^{1}	—N/a	23
NC	20	(New Zealand) Mitch Evans	Jaguar	no time	—N/a	24^{2}

Notes:

- **^1** – Robin Frijns and Neel Jani broke the 110% rule as their qualifying laps were cancelled due to them not respecting the homologated throttle pedal map. The Stewards gave them permission to start the race from the back of the grid.
- **^2** – Mitch Evans did not enter his qualifying lap before the time had run out. The Stewards gave him permission to start the race from the back of the grid.

=== Race ===
Drivers who scored points are denoted in bold.

Pos.	No.	Driver	Team	Laps	Time/Retired	Grid	Points
1	**13**	**(Portugal) António Félix da Costa**	**Techeetah-DS**	**34**	**46:52.757**	**1**	25+3^{1}
2	**28**	**(Germany) Maximilian Günther**	**Andretti-BMW**	**34**	**+11.427**	**2**	18+1^{2}
3	**25**	**(France) Jean-Éric Vergne**	**Techeetah-DS**	**34**	**+12.034**	**11**	15
4	**23**	**(Switzerland) Sébastien Buemi**	**e.dams-Nissan**	**34**	**+12.282**	**6**	12
5	**48**	**(Switzerland) Edoardo Mortara**	**Venturi-Mercedes**	**34**	**+15.657**	**5**	10
6	**20**	**(New Zealand) Mitch Evans**	**Jaguar**	**34**	**+16.335**	**24**	8+1^{3}
7	**11**	**(Brazil) Lucas di Grassi**	**Audi**	**34**	**+18.706**	**13**	6
8	**36**	**(Germany) André Lotterer**	**Porsche**	**34**	**+19.498**	**3**	4
9	**22**	**(United Kingdom) Oliver Rowland**	**e.dams-Nissan**	**34**	**+20.126**	**9**	2
10	**2**	**(United Kingdom) Sam Bird**	**Virgin-Audi**	**34**	**+20.295**	**14**	1
11	17	(Netherlands) Nyck de Vries	Mercedes	34	+20.557	4	
12	4	(Netherlands) Robin Frijns	Virgin-Audi	34	+22.373	22	
13	64	(Belgium) Jérôme d'Ambrosio	Mahindra	34	+22.785	7	
14	66	(Germany) Daniel Abt	Audi	34	+25.080	18	
15	5	(Belgium) Stoffel Vandoorne	Mercedes	34	+25.969	17	
16	51	(United Kingdom) James Calado	Jaguar	34	+26.528	10	
17	19	(Brazil) Felipe Massa	Venturi-Mercedes	34	+27.476	20	
18	18	(Switzerland) Neel Jani	Porsche	34	+44.476	23	
19	6	(New Zealand) Brendon Hartley	Dragon-Penske	34	+49.002	12	
20	7	(Switzerland) Nico Müller	Dragon-Penske	34	+53.075	16	
21	3	(United Kingdom) Oliver Turvey	NIO	34	+59.969	19	
22	94	(Germany) Pascal Wehrlein	Mahindra	34	+1:13.414	15	
23	33	(China) Ma Qinghua	NIO	33	+1 lap	21	
Ret	27	(United Kingdom) Alexander Sims	Andretti-BMW	33	Driveshaft	8	

Notes:

- **^1** – Pole position.
- **^2** – Fastest in group stage.
- **^3** – Fastest lap.

== Standings after the race ==
Drivers' Championship standings

+/–	Pos	Driver	Points
2	1	(Portugal) António Félix da Costa	67
1	2	(New Zealand) Mitch Evans	56 (–11)
1	3	(United Kingdom) Alexander Sims	46 (–21)
4	4	(Germany) Maximilian Günther	44 (–23)
	5	(Brazil) Lucas di Grassi	38 (–29)

Teams' Championship standings

+/–	Pos	Constructor	Points
3	1	(China) Techeetah-DS	98
1	2	(United States) Andretti-BMW	90 (–8)
1	3	(United Kingdom) Jaguar	66 (–32)
1	4	(France) e.dams-Nissan	57 (–41)
2	5	(Germany) Mercedes	56 (–42)

- Notes: Only the top five positions are included for both sets of standings.

== Footnotes ==
Previous race: 2020 Mexico City ePrix	FIA Formula E Championship; 2019–20 season	Next race: 2020 Berlin ePrix; Several ePrixs cancelled
Previous race: 2019 Marrakesh ePrix	Marrakesh ePrix	Next race: 2022 Marrakesh ePrix
