= 2022 Rome ePrix =

Race 4 of 16 of the 2021–22 Formula E season
← Previous race	Next race →
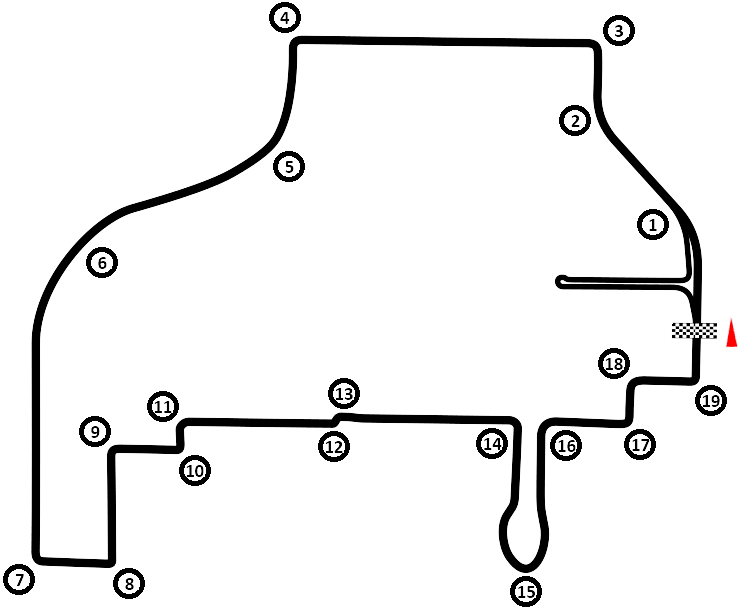

Race details
- Date: 9 April 2022
- Official name: 2022 Rome E-Prix
- Location: Circuto Cittadino dell'EUR, EUR, Rome
- Course: Street circuit
- Course length: 3.380 km (2.100 mi)
- Distance: 27 laps, 91.260 km (56.706 mi)

Pole position
Driver	(Belgium) Stoffel Vandoorne	Mercedes
- Time: 1:39.151

Fastest lap
Driver	(Brazil) Lucas Di Grassi (New Zealand) Nick Cassidy (Note: Cassidy received the point for fastest lap as Di Grassi failed to finish in the top 10.)	Venturi-Mercedes; Envision-Audi
- Time: 1:41.653 (1:41.729) on lap 21 (19)

Podium
First	(New Zealand) Mitch Evans	Jaguar
Second	(Netherlands) Robin Frijns	Envision-Audi
Third	(Belgium) Stoffel Vandoorne	Mercedes

2022 Rome ePrix
Race 5 of 16 of the 2021–22 Formula E season
← Previous race	Next race →
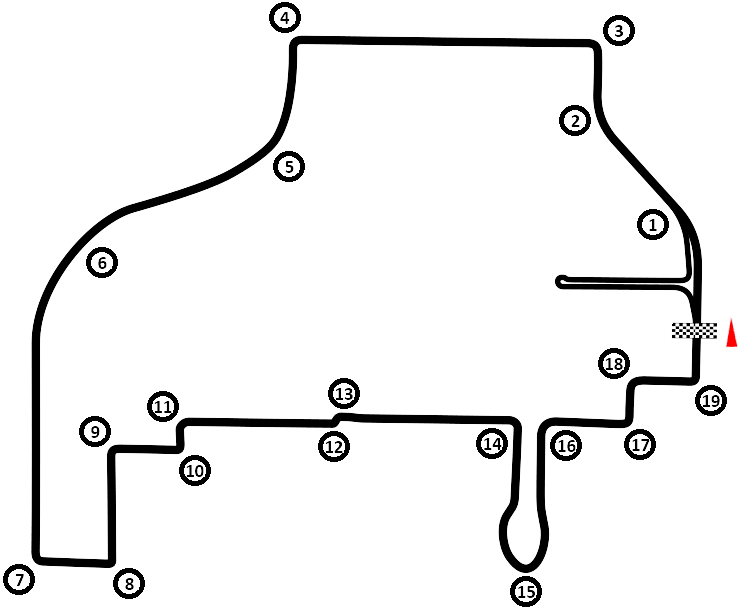

Race details
- Date: 10 April 2022
- Official name: 2022 Rome E-Prix
- Location: Circuto Cittadino dell'EUR, EUR, Rome
- Course: Street circuit
- Course length: 3.380 km (2.100 mi)
- Distance: 27 laps, 91.260 km (56.706 mi)

Pole position
Driver	(France) Jean-Éric Vergne	Techeetah-DS
- Time: 1:38.268

Fastest lap
Driver	(Netherlands) Robin Frijns	Envision-Audi
- Time: 1:41.256 on lap 13

Podium
First	(New Zealand) Mitch Evans	Jaguar
Second	(France) Jean-Éric Vergne	Techeetah-DS
Third	(Netherlands) Robin Frijns	Envision-Audi

The 2022 Rome ePrix was a pair of Formula E electric car races held at the Circuito Cittadino dell'EUR in the EUR residential and business district of the Italian capital of Rome on 9 and 10 April 2022. It served as the fourth and fifth rounds of the 2021–22 Formula E season, and marked the fourth edition of the event. Mitch Evans gained a total of 11 positions across the two races to claim double victory, with Robin Frijns and Stoffel Vandoorne following through in race one and Jean-Éric Vergne and Frijns completing the podium in race two.

== Classification ==
=== Race one ===
==== Qualifying ====
Group draw
Group A	(Switzerland) MOR (1)	(Germany) WEH (3)	(Belgium) VAN (5)	(United Kingdom) DEN (7)	(Netherlands) FRI (9)	(United Kingdom) BIR (11)	(Switzerland) BUE (13)	(United States) ASK (15)	(New Zealand) EVA (17)	(United Kingdom) SIM (19)	(United Kingdom) TIC (21)
Group B	(Netherlands) DEV (2)	(Germany) LOT (4)	(France) JEV (6)	(Brazil) DIG (8)	(Portugal) DAC (10)	(New Zealand) CAS (12)	(United Kingdom) ROW (14)	(Germany) GUE (16)	(United Kingdom) TUR (18)	(Brazil) SET (20)	(Italy) GIO (22)

===== Qualifying duels =====
Quarter-finals
B4	(Netherlands) Nyck de Vries
A1	(United Kingdom) Jake Dennis
B3	(Germany) André Lotterer
A2	(Netherlands) Robin Frijns
A3	(Belgium) Stoffel Vandoorne
B2	(France) Jean-Éric Vergne
A4	(Germany) Pascal Wehrlein
B1	(Portugal) António Félix da Costa

Semi-finals
(Netherlands) Nyck de Vries
(Netherlands) Robin Frijns
(Belgium) Stoffel Vandoorne
(Portugal) António Félix da Costa

Final
(Netherlands) Robin Frijns
(Belgium) Stoffel Vandoorne

===== Overall classification =====
Pos.	No.	Driver	Team	A	B	QF	SF	F	Grid
1	5	(Belgium) Stoffel Vandoorne	Mercedes	1:40.128	—N/a	1:38.596	1:38.971	1:39.151	1
2	4	(Netherlands) Robin Frijns	Envision-Audi	1:40.128	—N/a	1:38.764	1:38.836	1:39.500	2
3	17	(Netherlands) Nyck de Vries	Mercedes	—N/a	1:40.458	1:38.980	1:38.949	—N/a	3
4	13	(Portugal) António Félix da Costa	Techeetah-DS	—N/a	1:40.227	1:39.038	1:38.986	—N/a	4
5	25	(France) Jean-Éric Vergne	Techeetah-DS	—N/a	1:40.309	1:39.105	—N/a	—N/a	5
6	27	(United Kingdom) Jake Dennis	Andretti-BMW	1:40.069	—N/a	1:39.288	—N/a	—N/a	6
7	94	(Germany) Pascal Wehrlein	Porsche	1:40.270	—N/a	1:39.363	—N/a	—N/a	7
8	36	(Germany) André Lotterer	Porsche	—N/a	1:40.357	1:39.482	—N/a	—N/a	8
9	9	(New Zealand) Mitch Evans	Jaguar	1:40.375	—N/a	—N/a	—N/a	—N/a	9
10	30	(United Kingdom) Oliver Rowland	Mahindra	—N/a	1:40.748	—N/a	—N/a	—N/a	10
11	48	(Switzerland) Edoardo Mortara	Venturi-Mercedes	1:40.554	—N/a	—N/a	—N/a	—N/a	11
12	11	(Brazil) Lucas di Grassi	Venturi-Mercedes	—N/a	1:40.770	—N/a	—N/a	—N/a	12
13	10	(United Kingdom) Sam Bird	Jaguar	1:40.836	—N/a	—N/a	—N/a	—N/a	13
14	37	(New Zealand) Nick Cassidy	Envision-Audi	—N/a	1:40.833	—N/a	—N/a	—N/a	14
15	29	(United Kingdom) Alexander Sims	Mahindra	1:40.930	—N/a	—N/a	—N/a	—N/a	15
16	22	(Germany) Maximilian Günther	e.dams-Nissan	—N/a	1:40.999	—N/a	—N/a	—N/a	16
17	23	(Switzerland) Sébastien Buemi	e.dams-Nissan	1:40.945	—N/a	—N/a	—N/a	—N/a	17
18	3	(United Kingdom) Oliver Turvey	NIO	—N/a	1:41.304	—N/a	—N/a	—N/a	18
19	28	(United States) Oliver Askew	Andretti-BMW	1:40.950	—N/a	—N/a	—N/a	—N/a	19
20	7	(Brazil) Sérgio Sette Câmara	Dragon-Penske	—N/a	1:41.570	—N/a	—N/a	—N/a	22^{1}
21	33	(United Kingdom) Dan Ticktum	NIO	1:41.410	—N/a	—N/a	—N/a	—N/a	20
22	99	(Italy) Antonio Giovinazzi	Dragon-Penske	—N/a	1:41.756	—N/a	—N/a	—N/a	21

Notes:

- ^1 – Sérgio Sette Câmara received a 3-place grid penalty for speeding under red flag.

==== Race ====
Pos.	No.	Driver	Team	Laps	Time/Retired	Grid	Points
1	9	(New Zealand) Mitch Evans	Jaguar	27	51:59.632	9	25
2	4	(Netherlands) Robin Frijns	Envision-Audi	27	+5.703	2	18
3	5	(Belgium) Stoffel Vandoorne	Mercedes	27	+6.966	1	15+3^{1}
4	25	(France) Jean-Éric Vergne	Techeetah-DS	27	+7.553	5	12
5	10	(United Kingdom) Sam Bird	Jaguar	27	+7.877	13	10
6	13	(Portugal) António Félix da Costa	Techeetah-DS	27	+8.971	4	8
7	48	(Switzerland) Edoardo Mortara	Venturi-Mercedes	27	+13.356^{3}	11	6
8	94	(Germany) Pascal Wehrlein	Porsche	27	+14.216	7	4
9	37	(New Zealand) Nick Cassidy	Envision-Audi	27	+14.543	14	2+1^{2}
10	36	(Germany) André Lotterer	Porsche	27	+19.339	8	1
11	11	(Brazil) Lucas di Grassi	Venturi-Mercedes	27	+19.731	12	
12	29	(United Kingdom) Alexander Sims	Mahindra	27	+24.758	15	
13	27	(United Kingdom) Jake Dennis	Andretti-BMW	27	+25.029^{3}	6	
14	28	(United States) Oliver Askew	Andretti-BMW	27	+28.039	19	
15	7	(Brazil) Sérgio Sette Câmara	Dragon-Penske	27	+28.645^{4}	22	
16	23	(Switzerland) Sébastien Buemi	e.dams-Nissan	27	+28.865	17	
17	3	(United Kingdom) Oliver Turvey	NIO	27	+58.372	18	
18	33	(United Kingdom) Dan Ticktum	NIO	27	+1:19.306^{4}	20	
19	99	(Italy) Antonio Giovinazzi	Dragon-Penske	27	+1:37.231^{4}	21	
Ret	17	(Netherlands) Nyck de Vries	Mercedes	25	Collision damage	3	
Ret	30	(United Kingdom) Oliver Rowland	Mahindra	17	Retired in pits	10	
Ret	22	(Germany) Maximilian Günther	e.dams-Nissan	0	Accident	16	

Notes:

- ^1 – Pole position.
- ^2 – Fastest lap.
- ^3 – Edoardo Mortara and Jake Dennis received a 5-second time penalty each for causing a collision.
- ^4 – Sérgio Sette Câmara, Antonio Giovinazzi and Dan Ticktum all received a 5-second time penalty for a safety car infringement. Giovinazzi also received a post-race drive-through penalty converted into a 30-second time penalty for exceeding the full course yellow speed and gaining an advantage.

==== Standings after the race ====
Drivers' Championship standings

	Pos	Driver	Points
	1	(Switzerland) Edoardo Mortara	49
3	2	(Belgium) Stoffel Vandoorne	46
6	3	(Netherlands) Robin Frijns	42
2	4	(France) Jean-Éric Vergne	39
3	5	(Netherlands) Nyck de Vries	38

Teams' Championship standings

	Pos	Constructor	Points
1	1	(Germany) Mercedes	84
1	2	(Monaco) Venturi-Mercedes	74
	3	(Germany) Porsche	65
	4	(France) Techeetah-DS	59
	5	(United Kingdom) Envision-Audi	52

=== Race two ===
==== Qualifying ====
Group draw
Group A	(Switzerland) MOR (1)	(Netherlands) FRI (3)	(Netherlands) DEV (5)	(Germany) LOT (7)	(United Kingdom) DEN (9)	(United Kingdom) BIR (11)	(New Zealand) CAS (13)	(United Kingdom) ROW (15)	(Germany) GUE (17)	(United Kingdom) TUR (19)	(United Kingdom) TIC (21)
Group B	(Belgium) VAN (2)	(France) JEV (4)	(Germany) WEH (6)	(New Zealand) EVA (8)	(Brazil) DIG (10)	(Portugal) DAC (12)	(Switzerland) BUE (14)	(United States) ASK (16)	(United Kingdom) SIM (18)	(Brazil) SET (20)	(Italy) GIO (22)

===== Qualifying duels =====
Quarter-finals
B4	(France) Jean-Éric Vergne
A1	(Netherlands) Robin Frijns
B3	(Belgium) Stoffel Vandoorne
A2	(Germany) André Lotterer
A3	(United Kingdom) Jake Dennis
B2	(Germany) Pascal Wehrlein
A4	(United Kingdom) Sam Bird
B1	(New Zealand) Mitch Evans

Semi-finals
(France) Jean-Éric Vergne
(Germany) André Lotterer
(United Kingdom) Jake Dennis
(New Zealand) Mitch Evans

Final
(France) Jean-Éric Vergne
(United Kingdom) Jake Dennis

===== Overall classification =====
Pos.	No.	Driver	Team	A	B	QF	SF	F	Grid
1	25	(France) Jean-Éric Vergne	Techeetah-DS	—N/a	1:39.744	1:38.348	1:38.149	1:38.268	1
2	27	(United Kingdom) Jake Dennis	Andretti-BMW	1:39.790	—N/a	1:38.225	1:37.997	1:38.489	2
3	36	(Germany) André Lotterer	Porsche	1:39.614	—N/a	1:38.422	1:38.361	—N/a	3
4	9	(New Zealand) Mitch Evans	Jaguar	—N/a	1:39.612	1:38.127	1:38.499	—N/a	4
5	10	(United Kingdom) Sam Bird	Jaguar	1:39.847	—N/a	1:38.425	—N/a	—N/a	5
6	4	(Netherlands) Robin Frijns	Envision-Audi	1:39.416	—N/a	1:38.433	—N/a	—N/a	6
7	94	(Germany) Pascal Wehrlein	Porsche	—N/a	1:39.669	1:38.566	—N/a	—N/a	7
8	5	(Belgium) Stoffel Vandoorne	Mercedes	—N/a	1:39.703	1:38.776	—N/a	—N/a	8
9	13	(Portugal) António Félix da Costa	Techeetah-DS	—N/a	1:39.765	—N/a	—N/a	—N/a	9
10	17	(Netherlands) Nyck de Vries	Mercedes	1:39.852	—N/a	—N/a	—N/a	—N/a	13^{1}
11	7	(Brazil) Sérgio Sette Câmara	Dragon-Penske	—N/a	1:40.012	—N/a	—N/a	—N/a	10
12	48	(Switzerland) Edoardo Mortara	Venturi-Mercedes	1:39.880	—N/a	—N/a	—N/a	—N/a	11
13	11	(Brazil) Lucas di Grassi	Venturi-Mercedes	—N/a	1:40.065	—N/a	—N/a	—N/a	12
14	30	(United Kingdom) Oliver Rowland	Mahindra	1:40.068	—N/a	—N/a	—N/a	—N/a	14
15	23	(Switzerland) Sébastien Buemi	e.dams-Nissan	—N/a	1:40.114	—N/a	—N/a	—N/a	15
16	22	(Germany) Maximilian Günther	e.dams-Nissan	1:40.328	—N/a	—N/a	—N/a	—N/a	16
17	28	(United States) Oliver Askew	Andretti-BMW	—N/a	1:40.165	—N/a	—N/a	—N/a	17
18	37	(New Zealand) Nick Cassidy	Envision-Audi	1:40.375	—N/a	—N/a	—N/a	—N/a	18
19	29	(United Kingdom) Alexander Sims	Mahindra	—N/a	1:40.469	—N/a	—N/a	—N/a	19
20	33	(United Kingdom) Dan Ticktum	NIO	1:40.565	—N/a	—N/a	—N/a	—N/a	20
21	99	(Italy) Antonio Giovinazzi	Dragon-Penske	—N/a	1:40.574	—N/a	—N/a	—N/a	21
22	3	(United Kingdom) Oliver Turvey	NIO	1:40.749	—N/a	—N/a	—N/a	—N/a	22

Notes:

- ^1 – Nyck de Vries received a 3-place grid penalty for causing a collision in race one.

==== Race ====
Pos.	No.	Driver	Team	Laps	Time/Retired	Grid	Points
1	9	(New Zealand) Mitch Evans	Jaguar	27	52:55.224	4	25
2	25	(France) Jean-Éric Vergne	Techeetah-DS	27	+0.584	1	18+3^{1}
3	4	(Netherlands) Robin Frijns	Envision-Audi	27	+1.606	6	15+1^{2}
4	36	(Germany) André Lotterer	Porsche	27	+2.093	3	12
5	5	(Belgium) Stoffel Vandoorne	Mercedes	27	+2.756	8	10
6	94	(Germany) Pascal Wehrlein	Porsche	27	+4.655	7	8
7	3	(United Kingdom) Oliver Turvey	NIO	27	+7.097	22	6
8	11	(Brazil) Lucas di Grassi	Venturi-Mercedes	27	+8.680^{3}	12	4
9	23	(Switzerland) Sébastien Buemi	e.dams-Nissan	27	+8.796	15	2
10	33	(United Kingdom) Dan Ticktum	NIO	27	+11.130	20	1
11	22	(Germany) Maximilian Günther	e.dams-Nissan	27	+11.221	16	
12	7	(Brazil) Sérgio Sette Câmara	Dragon-Penske	27	+12.309	10	
13	13	(Portugal) António Félix da Costa	Techeetah-DS	27	+13.134^{4}	9	
14	17	(Netherlands) Nyck de Vries	Mercedes	27	+14.207^{5}	13	
15	28	(United States) Oliver Askew	Andretti-BMW	27	+20.429^{6}	17	
Ret	10	(United Kingdom) Sam Bird	Jaguar	26	Collision damage	5	
Ret	37	(New Zealand) Nick Cassidy	Envision-Audi	25	Collision damage	18	
Ret	27	(United Kingdom) Jake Dennis	Andretti-BMW	21	Collision damage	2	
Ret	30	(United Kingdom) Alexander Sims	Mahindra	16	Accident	19	
Ret	29	(United Kingdom) Oliver Rowland	Mahindra	14	Retired	14	
Ret	48	(Switzerland) Edoardo Mortara	Venturi-Mercedes	7	Collision damage	11	
Ret	99	(Italy) Antonio Giovinazzi	Dragon-Penske	7	Technical	21	

Notes:

- ^1 – Pole position.
- ^2 – Fastest lap.
- ^3 – Lucas di Grassi received a 5-second time penalty for causing a collision.
- ^4 – António Félix da Costa received a 5-second time penalty for forcing another driver off the track and causing a collision.
- ^5 – Nyck de Vries received a 10-second time penalty for causing a collision.
- ^6 – Oliver Askew received two 5-second time penalties, one for overtaking under the safety car and the other for causing a collision.

==== Standings after the race ====
Drivers' Championship standings

	Pos	Driver	Points
3	1	(France) Jean-Éric Vergne	60
1	2	(Netherlands) Robin Frijns	58
1	3	(Belgium) Stoffel Vandoorne	56
4	4	(New Zealand) Mitch Evans	51
4	5	(Switzerland) Edoardo Mortara	49

Teams' Championship standings

	Pos	Constructor	Points
	1	(Germany) Mercedes	94
1	2	(Germany) Porsche	85
1	3	(France) Techeetah-DS	80
2	4	(Monaco) Venturi-Mercedes	78
1	5	(United Kingdom) Jaguar	73

== Notes ==
Previous race: 2022 Mexico City ePrix	FIA Formula E World Championship; 2021–22 season	Next race: 2022 Monaco ePrix
Previous race: 2021 Rome ePrix	Rome ePrix	Next race: 2023 Rome ePrix
