= Rome Street Circuit =

Proposed motorsport circuit in Rome, Italy

- Location: Rome, Lazio, Italy

The Rome Street Circuit was a proposed motorsport circuit, to be on the streets of Rome. An initial agreement to host Formula One races starting in 2012 was announced in December 2009, but after a lack of support from residents and no agreement to share the Italian Grand Prix with Monza, the project was abandoned in early 2011.

== Layout ==
The proposed layout depicted a track in the southern outskirts of the city, in the Esposizione Universale Roma area, an area built by Benito Mussolini to host the World Expo in 1942, before it was cancelled by the outbreak of World War II. Bernie Ecclestone said that the track could have had a close proximity to the Vatican, joking that, "every time there is an overtaking manoeuvre, we’re going to put the black smoke up."

The proposed circuit ran over roads near Tre Fontane Abbey, using a route that partially followed the circuit used for the Rome Grand Prix between 1928 and 1930.

== History ==
The history of this project can be traced back to 1984, when the idea was first floated by former Formula Two driver and World Superbike promoter Maurizio Flammini, who then revived the idea in January 2009. Flammini, now the course planner, then gained the support of mayor Gianni Alemanno. Alemanno said that the race would bring €1 billion to the city, and would be a part of the a plan to renew the city's tourist appeal into the future. However, Luca di Montezemolo, president of Ferrari, suggested the idea was unthinkable, and it should only be a one-off event, due to the large number of world-class permanent circuits in Italy, citing Monza, Imola, Mugello, Misano and Vallelunga as examples. In May 2009, Rome launched their plans, beginning a Roma Formula Futuro campaign.

== Legacy ==
In 2018 a street circuit in the EUR district, known as the Circuto Cittadino dell'EUR, hosted the inaugural Rome ePrix for Formula E.

== See also ==
- Rome Grand Prix
