= 2021 Rome ePrix =

Third round of the 2020-21 Formula E Championship

Race 3 of 15 of the 2020–21 Formula E season
| ← Previous race | Next race → |
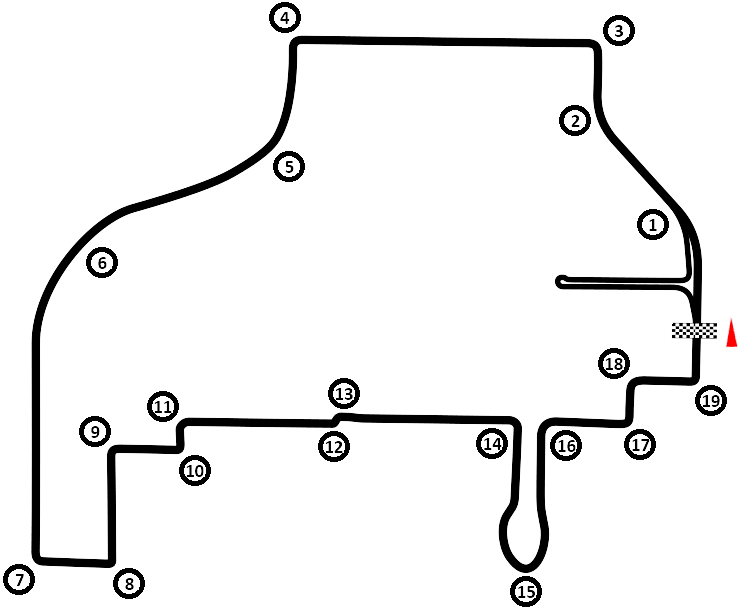

Race details
- Date: 10 April 2021
- Official name: 2021 Rome E-Prix
- Location: Circuto Cittadino dell'EUR, EUR, Rome
- Course: Street circuit
- Course length: 3.380 km (2.100 mi)
- Distance: 24 laps, 81.120 km (50.406 mi)

Pole position
| Driver | (Belgium) Stoffel Vandoorne | Mercedes |
- Time: 1:38.484

Fastest lap
| Driver | (New Zealand) Mitch Evans | Jaguar |
- Time: 1:42.387 on lap 20

Podium
| First | (France) Jean-Éric Vergne | Techeetah-DS |
| Second | (United Kingdom) Sam Bird | Jaguar |
| Third | (New Zealand) Mitch Evans | Jaguar |

2021 Rome ePrix
Race 4 of 15 of the 2020–21 Formula E season
| ← Previous race | Next race → |
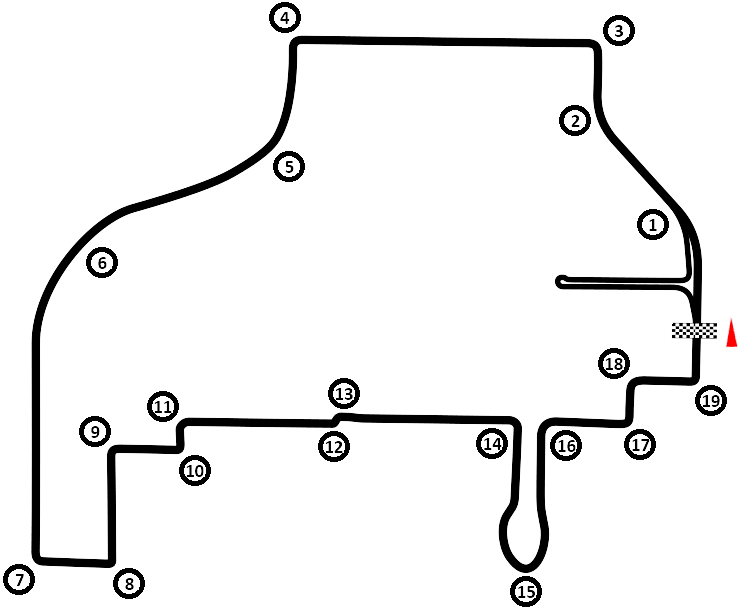

Race details
- Date: 11 April 2021
- Official name: 2021 Rome E-Prix
- Location: Circuto Cittadino dell'EUR, EUR, Rome
- Course: Street circuit
- Course length: 3.380 km (2.100 mi)
- Distance: 23 laps, 77.740 km (48.305 mi)

Pole position
| Driver | (New Zealand) Nick Cassidy | Virgin-Audi |
- Time: 1:52.011

Fastest lap
| Driver | (Netherlands) Nyck de Vries (Belgium) Stoffel Vandoorne (Note: Vandoorne received the point for fastest lap as De Vries failed to finish in the top 10.) | Mercedes; Mercedes |
- Time: 1:40.771 (1:41.820) on lap 11 (12)

Podium
| First | (Belgium) Stoffel Vandoorne | Mercedes |
| Second | (United Kingdom) Alexander Sims | Mahindra |
| Third | (Germany) Pascal Wehrlein | Porsche |

The 2021 Rome ePrix was a pair of Formula E electric car races held at the Circuito Cittadino dell'EUR in the EUR residential and business district of the Italian capital of Rome on 10 and 11 April 2021. It marked the third and fourth rounds of the 2020–21 Formula E season, as well as the third running of the event. The first race was won by Jean-Éric Vergne, with Sam Bird and Mitch Evans rounding out the podium. Stoffel Vandoorne won the second race, ahead of Alexander Sims and Pascal Wehrlein.

== Classification ==
=== Race one ===
==== Qualifying ====
Group draw
| Group 1 | (Netherlands) DEV (1) | (United Kingdom) BIR (2) | (Netherlands) FRI (3) | (Switzerland) MOR (4) | (Portugal) DAC (5) | (New Zealand) EVA (6) |
| Group 2 | (United Kingdom) ROW (7) | (Germany) RAS (8) | (Brazil) SET (9) | (Germany) WEH (10) | (Switzerland) MUL (11) | (United Kingdom) TUR (12) |
| Group 3 | (United Kingdom) SIM (13) | (Brazil) DIG (14) | (Belgium) VAN (15) | (Germany) LOT (16) | (France) JEV (17) | (United Kingdom) DEN (18) |
| Group 4 | (Switzerland) BUE (19) | (France) NAT (20) | (New Zealand) CAS (21) | (United Kingdom) BLO (22) | (Germany) GUE (23) | (United Kingdom) LYN (24) |

| Pos. | No. | Driver | Team | GS | SP | Grid |
|---|---|---|---|---|---|---|
| 1 | 5 | (Belgium) Stoffel Vandoorne | Mercedes | 1:38.963 | 1:38.484 | 1 |
| 2 | 36 | (Germany) André Lotterer | Porsche | 1:38.627 | 1:38.651 | 2 |
| 3 | 22 | (United Kingdom) Oliver Rowland | e.dams-Nissan | 1:38.491 | 1:38.889 | 3 |
| 4 | 11 | (Brazil) Lucas di Grassi | Audi | 1:39.050 | 1:38.903 | 4 |
| 5 | 25 | (France) Jean-Éric Vergne | Techeetah-DS | 1:39.066 | 1:38.947 | 5 |
| 6 | 28 | (Germany) Maximilian Günther | Andretti-BMW | 1:39.068 | 1:39.751 | 11^{1} |
| 7 | 4 | (Netherlands) Robin Frijns | Virgin-Audi | 1:39.081 | —N/a | 6 |
| 8 | 17 | (Netherlands) Nyck de Vries | Mercedes | 1:39.162 | —N/a | 7 |
| 9 | 99 | (Germany) Pascal Wehrlein | Porsche | 1:39.241 | —N/a | 8 |
| 10 | 23 | (Switzerland) Sébastien Buemi | e.dams-Nissan | 1:39.348 | —N/a | 9 |
| 11 | 10 | (United Kingdom) Sam Bird | Jaguar | 1:39.443 | —N/a | 10 |
| 12 | 20 | (New Zealand) Mitch Evans | Jaguar | 1:39.654 | —N/a | 12 |
| 13 | 94 | (United Kingdom) Alex Lynn | Mahindra | 1:39.743 | —N/a | 13 |
| 14 | 71 | (France) Norman Nato | Venturi-Mercedes | 1:39.762 | —N/a | 14 |
| 15 | 29 | (United Kingdom) Alexander Sims | Mahindra | 1:39.829 | —N/a | 15 |
| 16 | 7 | (Brazil) Sérgio Sette Câmara | Dragon-Penske | 1:39.943 | —N/a | 16 |
| 17 | 6 | (Switzerland) Nico Müller | Dragon-Penske | 1:40.057 | —N/a | 17 |
| 18 | 13 | (Portugal) António Félix da Costa | Techeetah-DS | 1:40.079 | —N/a | 18 |
| 19 | 88 | (United Kingdom) Tom Blomqvist | NIO | 1:40.120 | —N/a | 21^{2} |
| 20 | 27 | (United Kingdom) Jake Dennis | Andretti-BMW | 1:40.456 | —N/a | 19 |
| 21 | 33 | (Germany) René Rast | Audi | 1:48.022 | —N/a | 20 |
| 22 | 37 | (New Zealand) Nick Cassidy | Virgin-Audi | 1:51.081 | —N/a | 22 |
| 23 | 48 | (Switzerland) Edoardo Mortara | Venturi-Mercedes | no time | —N/a | 23 |
| 24 | 8 | (United Kingdom) Oliver Turvey | NIO | no time | —N/a | PL^{3} |

Notes:

- ^1 – Maximilian Günther received a 5-place grid penalty for causing a collision in the previous race at Diriyah.
- ^2 – Tom Blomqvist received a 3-place grid penalty for entering the fast lane too early during qualifying.
- ^3 – Oliver Turvey was penalised with a pit lane start for causing a collision dangerously at the end of free practice 1.

==== Race ====
| Pos. | No. | Driver | Team | Laps | Time/Retired | Grid | Points |
|---|---|---|---|---|---|---|---|
| 1 | 25 | (France) Jean-Éric Vergne | Techeetah-DS | 24 | 48:47.177 | 5 | 25 |
| 2 | 10 | (United Kingdom) Sam Bird | Jaguar | 24 | +0.461 | 10 | 18 |
| 3 | 20 | (New Zealand) Mitch Evans | Jaguar | 24 | +0.756 | 12 | 15+1^{1} |
| 4 | 4 | (Netherlands) Robin Frijns | Virgin-Audi | 24 | +1.034 | 6 | 12 |
| 5 | 23 | (Switzerland) Sébastien Buemi | e.dams-Nissan | 24 | +3.142 | 9 | 10 |
| 6 | 33 | (Germany) René Rast | Audi | 24 | +3.534 | 20 | 8 |
| 7 | 99 | (Germany) Pascal Wehrlein | Porsche | 24 | +3.918 | 8 | 6 |
| 8 | 94 | (United Kingdom) Alex Lynn | Mahindra | 24 | +5.720 | 13 | 4 |
| 9 | 28 | (Germany) Maximilian Günther | Andretti-BMW | 24 | +18.296 | 11 | 2 |
| 10 | 88 | (United Kingdom) Tom Blomqvist | NIO | 24 | +19.089 | 21 | 1 |
| 11 | 71 | (France) Norman Nato | Venturi-Mercedes | 24 | +20.045 | 14 | |
| 12 | 22 | (United Kingdom) Oliver Rowland | e.dams-Nissan | 24 | +20.270 | 3 | 1^{2} |
| 13 | 6 | (Switzerland) Nico Müller | Dragon-Penske | 24 | +21.155 | 17 | |
| 14 | 36 | (Germany) André Lotterer | Porsche | 24 | +22.987^{4} | 2 | |
| 15 | 37 | (New Zealand) Nick Cassidy | Virgin-Audi | 24 | +23.763^{4} | 22 | |
| 16 | 7 | (Brazil) Sérgio Sette Câmara | Dragon-Penske | 24 | +26.415^{5} | 16 | |
| Ret | 11 | (Brazil) Lucas di Grassi | Audi | 21 | Driveshaft | 4 | |
| Ret | 17 | (Netherlands) Nyck de Vries | Mercedes | 21 | Collision damage | 7 | |
| Ret | 5 | (Belgium) Stoffel Vandoorne | Mercedes | 21 | Collision | 1 | 3^{3} |
| Ret | 13 | (Portugal) António Félix da Costa | Techeetah-DS | 20 | Puncture | 18 | |
| Ret | 27 | (United Kingdom) Jake Dennis | Andretti-BMW | 17 | Collision damage | 19 | |
| Ret | 48 | (Switzerland) Edoardo Mortara | Venturi-Mercedes | 10 | Collision damage | 23 | |
| Ret | 29 | (United Kingdom) Alexander Sims | Mahindra | 2 | Collision damage | 15 | |
| DNS | 8 | (United Kingdom) Oliver Turvey | NIO | 0 | Did not start^{6} | PL | |

Notes:

- ^1 – Fastest lap.
- ^2 – Fastest in group stage.
- ^3 – Pole position.
- ^4 – André Lotterer and Nick Cassidy received a 5-second time penalty each for causing a collision.
- ^5 – Sérgio Sette Câmara received a post-race 5-second time penalty for speeding under full course yellow.
- ^6 – Oliver Turvey did not start the race as his team could not rebuild his car in time following his free practice shunt.

==== Standings after the race ====
Drivers' Championship standings

| +/– | Pos | Driver | Points |
|---|---|---|---|
| 1 | 1 | (United Kingdom) Sam Bird | 43 |
| 1 | 2 | (Netherlands) Robin Frijns | 34 |
| 2 | 3 | (Netherlands) Nyck de Vries | 32 |
| 2 | 4 | (New Zealand) Mitch Evans | 31 |
| 12 | 5 | (France) Jean-Éric Vergne | 25 |

Teams' Championship standings

| +/– | Pos | Constructor | Points |
|---|---|---|---|
| | 1 | (United Kingdom) Jaguar | 74 |
| 5 | 2 | (China) Techeetah-DS | 40 |
| 1 | 3 | (Germany) Mercedes | 39 |
| 1 | 4 | (United Kingdom) Virgin-Audi | 34 |
| | 5 | (Germany) Audi | 27 |

- Notes: Only the top five positions are included for both sets of standings.

=== Race two ===
==== Qualifying ====
Group draw
| Group 1 | (United Kingdom) BIR (1) | (Netherlands) FRI (2) | (Netherlands) DEV (3) | (New Zealand) EVA (4) | (France) JEV (5) | (Germany) RAS (6) |
| Group 2 | (Switzerland) MOR (7) | (Germany) WEH (8) | (Portugal) DAC (9) | (United Kingdom) ROW (10) | (Brazil) SET (11) | (Switzerland) BUE (12) |
| Group 3 | (Switzerland) MUL (13) | (United Kingdom) TUR (14) | (Belgium) VAN (15) | (United Kingdom) SIM (16) | (Brazil) DIG (17) | (United Kingdom) LYN (18) |
| Group 4 | (Germany) GUE (19) | (United Kingdom) BLO (20) | (France) NAT (21) | (Germany) LOT (22) | (United Kingdom) DEN (23) | (New Zealand) CAS (24) |

| Pos. | No. | Driver | Team | GS | SP | Grid |
|---|---|---|---|---|---|---|
| 1 | 37 | (New Zealand) Nick Cassidy | Virgin-Audi | 1:56.860 | 1:52.011 | 1 |
| 2 | 71 | (France) Norman Nato | Venturi-Mercedes | 1:56.006 | 1:52.343 | 2 |
| 3 | 99 | (Germany) Pascal Wehrlein | Porsche | 1:58.777 | 1:52.630 | 3 |
| 4 | 5 | (Belgium) Stoffel Vandoorne | Mercedes | 1:59.105 | 1:54.359 | 4 |
| 5 | 28 | (Germany) Maximilian Günther | Andretti-BMW | 1:58.274 | 1:54.701 | 5 |
| 6 | 29 | (United Kingdom) Alexander Sims | Mahindra | 1:58.500 | 1:55.598 | 6 |
| 7 | 48 | (Switzerland) Edoardo Mortara | Venturi-Mercedes | 1:59.497 | —N/a | 7 |
| 8 | 22 | (United Kingdom) Oliver Rowland | e.dams-Nissan | 1:59.512 | —N/a | 8 |
| 9 | 6 | (Switzerland) Nico Müller | Dragon-Penske | 1:59.630 | —N/a | 9 |
| 10 | 23 | (Switzerland) Sébastien Buemi | e.dams-Nissan | 1:59.701 | —N/a | 10 |
| 11 | 10 | (United Kingdom) Sam Bird | Jaguar | 1:59.739 | —N/a | 11 |
| 12 | 20 | (New Zealand) Mitch Evans | Jaguar | 2:00.128 | —N/a | 12 |
| 13 | 11 | (Brazil) Lucas di Grassi | Audi | 2:00.150 | —N/a | 13 |
| 14 | 88 | (United Kingdom) Tom Blomqvist | NIO | 2:00.205 | —N/a | 14 |
| 15 | 13 | (Portugal) António Félix da Costa | Techeetah-DS | 2:00.557 | —N/a | 15 |
| 16 | 94 | (United Kingdom) Alex Lynn | Mahindra | 2:00.943 | —N/a | 16 |
| 17 | 8 | (United Kingdom) Oliver Turvey | NIO | 2:01.197 | —N/a | PL^{1} |
| 18 | 17 | (Netherlands) Nyck de Vries | Mercedes | 2:01.229 | —N/a | 17 |
| 19 | 4 | (Netherlands) Robin Frijns | Virgin-Audi | 2:02.038 | —N/a | 18 |
| 20 | 33 | (Germany) René Rast | Audi | 2:02.061 | —N/a | 19 |
| 21 | 25 | (France) Jean-Éric Vergne | Techeetah-DS | 2:04.864 | —N/a | 20 |
| 22 | 36 | (Germany) André Lotterer | Porsche | no time | —N/a | 21 |
| 23 | 7 | (Brazil) Sérgio Sette Câmara | Dragon-Penske | no time | —N/a | 22 |
| 24 | 27 | (United Kingdom) Jake Dennis | Andretti-BMW | no time | —N/a | 23 |

Notes:

- ^1 – As Oliver Turvey did not start race one, his pit lane start penalty was applied in race two.

==== Race ====
| Pos. | No. | Driver | Team | Laps | Time/Retired | Grid | Points |
|---|---|---|---|---|---|---|---|
| 1 | 5 | (Belgium) Stoffel Vandoorne | Mercedes | 23 | 46:52.603 | 4 | 25+1^{1} |
| 2 | 29 | (United Kingdom) Alexander Sims | Mahindra | 23 | +0.666 | 6 | 18 |
| 3 | 99 | (Germany) Pascal Wehrlein | Porsche | 23 | +2.346 | 3 | 15 |
| 4 | 48 | (Switzerland) Edoardo Mortara | Venturi-Mercedes | 23 | +5.018 | 7 | 12 |
| 5 | 28 | (Germany) Maximilian Günther | Andretti-BMW | 23 | +5.305 | 5 | 10 |
| 6 | 20 | (New Zealand) Mitch Evans | Jaguar | 23 | +5.671 | 12 | 8 |
| 7 | 13 | (Portugal) António Félix da Costa | Techeetah-DS | 23 | +6.133 | 15 | 6 |
| 8 | 88 | (United Kingdom) Tom Blomqvist | NIO | 23 | +12.032 | 14 | 4 |
| 9 | 6 | (Switzerland) Nico Müller | Dragon-Penske | 23 | +12.872 | 9 | 2 |
| 10 | 23 | (Switzerland) Sébastien Buemi | e.dams-Nissan | 23 | +14.795^{4} | 10 | 1 |
| 11 | 25 | (France) Jean-Éric Vergne | Techeetah-DS | 23 | +15.676 | 20 | |
| 12 | 7 | (Brazil) Sérgio Sette Câmara | Dragon-Penske | 23 | +16.009 | 22 | |
| 13 | 27 | (United Kingdom) Jake Dennis | Andretti-BMW | 23 | +16.352 | 23 | |
| 14 | 8 | (United Kingdom) Oliver Turvey | NIO | 23 | +17.134 | PL | |
| 15 | 36 | (Germany) André Lotterer | Porsche | 23 | +17.838 | 21 | |
| 16 | 22 | (United Kingdom) Oliver Rowland | e.dams-Nissan | 23 | +21.140^{5} | 8 | |
| 17 | 94 | (United Kingdom) Alex Lynn | Mahindra | 23 | +37.697^{6} | 16 | |
| 18 | 4 | (Netherlands) Robin Frijns | Virgin-Audi | 23 | +43.103^{6} | 18 | |
| Ret | 10 | (United Kingdom) Sam Bird | Jaguar | 22 | Collision | 11 | |
| Ret | 17 | (Netherlands) Nyck de Vries | Mercedes | 22 | Collision | 17 | |
| Ret | 37 | (New Zealand) Nick Cassidy | Virgin-Audi | 21 | Collision damage^{6} | 1 | 3^{2} |
| Ret | 33 | (Germany) René Rast | Audi | 19 | Suspension/Accident | 19 | |
| Ret | 11 | (Brazil) Lucas di Grassi | Audi | 7 | Collision | 13 | |
| DSQ^{7} | 71 | (France) Norman Nato | Venturi-Mercedes | 23 | Energy usage | 2 | 1^{3} |

Notes:

- ^1 – Fastest lap.
- ^2 – Pole position.
- ^3 – Fastest in group stage.
- ^4 – Sébastien Buemi received a 5-second time penalty for causing a collision.
- ^5 – Oliver Rowland received a 10-second time penalty for causing a collision.
- ^6 – Lynn, Frijns and Cassidy all received a post-race drive-through penalty converted into a 30-second time penalty for failing to activate the third of the three mandatory attack modes. Frijns also received a further 5-second time penalty for a safety car infringement.
- ^7 – Norman Nato originally finished third, but was disqualified from the race due to his energy used being over the regulatory limit.

==== Standings after the race ====
Drivers' Championship standings

| +/– | Pos | Driver | Points |
|---|---|---|---|
| | 1 | (United Kingdom) Sam Bird | 43 |
| 2 | 2 | (New Zealand) Mitch Evans | 39 |
| 1 | 3 | (Netherlands) Robin Frijns | 34 |
| 11 | 4 | (Belgium) Stoffel Vandoorne | 33 |
| 2 | 5 | (Netherlands) Nyck de Vries | 32 |

Teams' Championship standings

| +/– | Pos | Constructor | Points |
|---|---|---|---|
| | 1 | (United Kingdom) Jaguar | 82 |
| 1 | 2 | (Germany) Mercedes | 65 |
| 1 | 3 | (China) Techeetah-DS | 46 |
| | 4 | (United Kingdom) Virgin-Audi | 37 |
| | 5 | (Germany) Porsche | 32 |

- Notes: Only the top five positions are included for both sets of standings.

== Notes ==
| Previous race: 2021 Diriyah ePrix | FIA Formula E World Championship; 2020–21 season | Next race: 2021 Valencia ePrix |
| Previous race: 2019 Rome ePrix | Rome ePrix | Next race: 2022 Rome ePrix |
