= 2023 Rome ePrix =

Race 13 of 16 of the 2022–23 Formula E season
← Previous race	Next race →
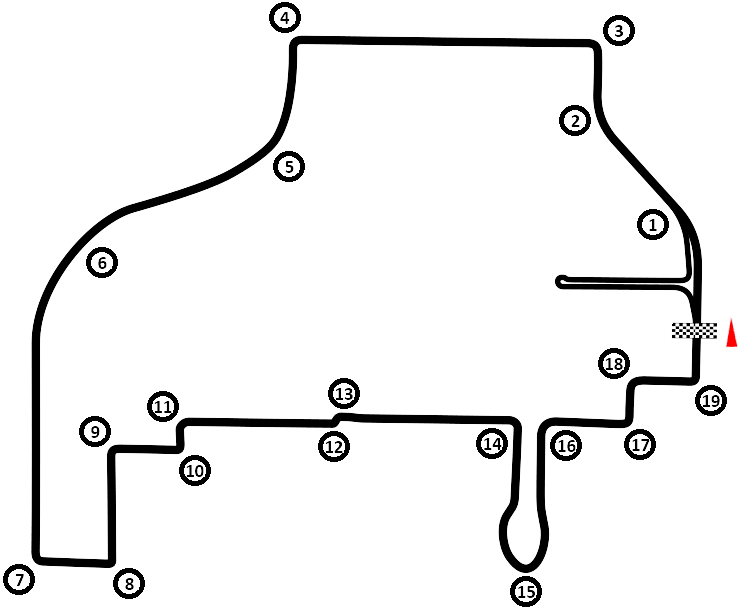

Race details
- Date: 15 July 2023
- Official name: 2023 Hankook Rome E-Prix
- Location: Circuito Cittadino dell'EUR, EUR, Rome, Italy
- Course: Street circuit
- Course length: 3.385 km (2.103 mi)
- Distance: 27 (Note: 25 planned laps and 2 extra laps) laps, 91.395 km (56.790 mi)
- Scheduled distance: 25 laps, 84.625 km (52.584 mi)

Pole position
Driver	(New Zealand) Mitch Evans	Jaguar
- Time: 1:39.089

Fastest lap
Driver	(New Zealand) Mitch Evans	Jaguar
- Time: 1:41.694 on lap 19

Podium
First	(New Zealand) Mitch Evans	Jaguar
Second	(New Zealand) Nick Cassidy	Envision Racing
Third	(Germany) Maximilian Günther	Maserati

2023 Rome ePrix
Race 14 of 16 of the 2022–23 Formula E season
← Previous race	Next race →
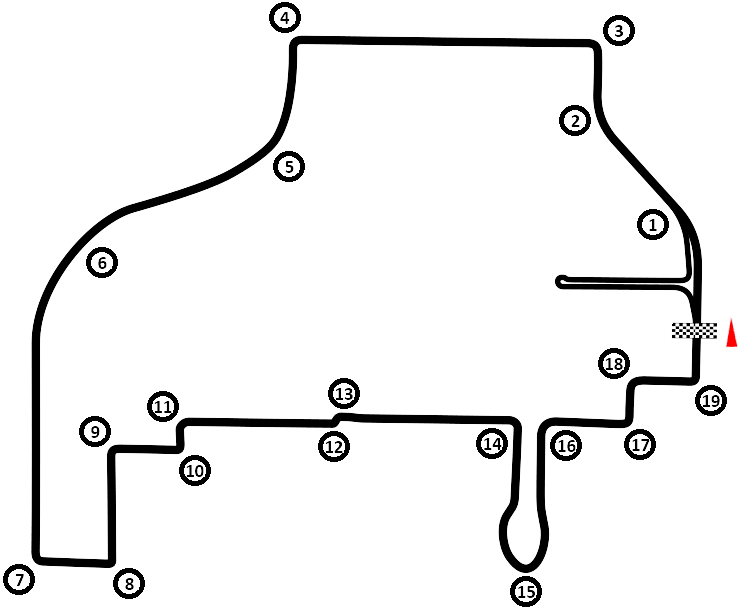

Race details
- Date: 16 July 2023
- Official name: 2023 Hankook Rome E-Prix
- Location: Circuito Cittadino dell'EUR, EUR, Rome, Italy
- Course: Street circuit
- Course length: 3.385 km (2.103 mi)
- Distance: 24 laps, 81.240 km (50.480 mi)

Pole position
Driver	(United Kingdom) Jake Dennis	Andretti-Porsche
- Time: 1:37.986

Fastest lap
Driver	(France) Jean-Éric Vergne	DS
- Time: 1:40.264 on lap 19

Podium
First	(United Kingdom) Jake Dennis	Andretti
Second	(France) Norman Nato	Nissan
Third	(United Kingdom) Sam Bird	Jaguar

The 2023 Rome ePrix, known for sponsorship reasons as the 2023 Hankook Rome E-Prix was a pair of Formula E electric car race held at the Circuito Cittadino dell'EUR in the EUR neighbourhood of Rome, Italy on the 15 and 16 July 2023. They served as the 13th and 14th rounds of the 2022-23 Formula E season and the fifth and final running of the Rome ePrix.

The first race was won by Mitch Evans for Jaguar Racing, who also took pole position and the fastest lap. Nick Cassidy and Maximilian Günther completed the podium. The second race was won from pole by Jake Dennis for Andretti, with Norman Nato and Sam Bird in second and third.

== Background ==
Jake Dennis entered the Rome ePrix in the lead of the championship, just one point ahead of Nick Cassidy. Pascal Wehrlein was third in the standings, 16 points behind Dennis.

== Classification ==
(All times in CEST)

=== Race 1 ===
==== Qualifying ====
Qualifying for race 1 took place at 10:40 AM on 15 July.

Group draw
Group A	(United Kingdom) DEN	(Germany) WEH	(France) JEV	(Germany) GUE	(United Kingdom) BIR	(Belgium) VAN	(France) FEN	(Germany) LOT	(United Kingdom) TIC	(Brazil) SET	(Switzerland) MUE
Group B	(New Zealand) CAS	(New Zealand) EVA	(Portugal) DAC	(Switzerland) BUE	(United Kingdom) HUG	(Germany) RAS	(Brazil) DIG	(France) NAT	(Switzerland) MOR	(Netherlands) FRI	(Spain) MER

Qualifying duels

Quarter-finals
A3	(United Kingdom) Jake Dennis
A2	(United Kingdom) Sam Bird
A4	(Germany) Maximilian Günther
A1	(France) Sacha Fenestraz
B3	(Germany) René Rast
B2	(Switzerland) Sébastien Buemi
B4	(Switzerland) Edoardo Mortara
B1	(New Zealand) Mitch Evans

Semi-finals
(France) Sacha Fenestraz
(United Kingdom) Sam Bird
(Switzerland) Sébastien Buemi
(New Zealand) Mitch Evans

Final
(United Kingdom) Sam Bird
(New Zealand) Mitch Evans

===== Overall classification =====
Pos.	No.	Driver	Team	A	B	QF	SF	F	Grid
1	9	(New Zealand) Mitch Evans	Jaguar	—N/a	1:39.300	1:38.460	1:38.461	1:39.089	1
2	10	(United Kingdom) Sam Bird	Jaguar	1:39.024	—N/a	1:38.816	1:38.761	1:40.985	2
3	23	(France) Sacha Fenestraz	Nissan	1:38.912	—N/a	1:38.872	1:39.807	—N/a	3
4	16	(Switzerland) Sébastien Buemi	Envision-Jaguar	—N/a	1:39.459	1:38.822	1:40.470	—N/a	4
5	58	(Germany) René Rast	McLaren-Nissan	—N/a	1:39.554	1:38.861	—N/a	—N/a	5
6	48	(Switzerland) Edoardo Mortara	Maserati	—N/a	1:39.562	1:38.900	—N/a	—N/a	6
7	27	(United Kingdom) Jake Dennis	Andretti-Porsche	1:39.214	—N/a	1:39.266	—N/a	—N/a	7
8	7	(Germany) Maximilian Günther	Maserati	1:39.413	—N/a	1:39.315	—N/a	—N/a	8
9	37	(New Zealand) Nick Cassidy	Envision	—N/a	1:39.630	—N/a	—N/a	—N/a	9
10	94	(Germany) Pascal Wehrlein	Porsche	1:39.447	—N/a	—N/a	—N/a	—N/a	10
11	17	(France) Norman Nato	Nissan	—N/a	1:39.968	—N/a	—N/a	—N/a	11
12	1	(Belgium) Stoffel Vandoorne	DS	1:39.601	—N/a	—N/a	—N/a	—N/a	12
13	13	(Portugal) António Félix da Costa	Porsche	—N/a	1:40.149	—N/a	—N/a	—N/a	13
14	51	(Switzerland) Nico Müller	ABT-Mahindra	1:39.664	—N/a	—N/a	—N/a	—N/a	14
15	11	(Brazil) Lucas di Grassi	Mahindra	—N/a	1:40.424	—N/a	—N/a	—N/a	15
16	25	(France) Jean-Éric Vergne	DS	1:39.701	—N/a	—N/a	—N/a	—N/a	16
17	4	(Netherlands) Robin Frijns	ABT-Mahindra	—N/a	1:40.485	—N/a	—N/a	—N/a	17
18	33	(United Kingdom) Dan Ticktum	NIO	1:39.729	—N/a	—N/a	—N/a	—N/a	18
19	8	(Spain) Roberto Merhi	Mahindra	—N/a	1:41.956	—N/a	—N/a	—N/a	19
20	36	(Germany) André Lotterer	Andretti-Porsche	1:39.931	—N/a	—N/a	—N/a	—N/a	20
21	3	(Brazil) Sérgio Sette Câmara	NIO	1:41.159	—N/a	—N/a	—N/a	—N/a	21
22	5	(United Kingdom) Jake Hughes	McLaren-Nissan	—N/a	No time (Note: All of Hughes' times were deleted for not setting a lap within the first six minutes of qualifying. He later withdrew from the race due to a crash.)	—N/a	—N/a	—N/a	

==== Race ====
Race 1 took place at 3:03 PM on 15 July. The race was red-flagged on lap 9 after a multi-car collision, and was resumed at 4:05 PM.

Pos.	No.	Driver	Team	Laps	Time/Retired	Grid	Points
1	9	(New Zealand) Mitch Evans	Jaguar	27	1:37:02.976	1	25+3^{1}+1^{2}
2	37	(New Zealand) Nick Cassidy	Envision-Jaguar	27	+1.639	9	18
3	7	(Germany) Maximilian Günther	Maserati	27	+9.126	8	15
4	27	(United Kingdom) Jake Dennis	Andretti-Porsche	27	+21.010	7	12
5	25	(France) Jean-Éric Vergne	DS	27	+21.482	16	10
6	51	(Switzerland) Nico Müller	ABT-Mahindra	27	+21.858	14	8
7	17	(France) Norman Nato	Nissan	27	+24.071	11	6
8	3	(Brazil) Sérgio Sette Câmara	NIO	27	+25.427	21	4
9	94	(Germany) Pascal Wehrlein	Porsche	27	+28.582	10	2
10	23	(France) Sacha Fenestraz	Nissan	27	+30.342	3	1
11	1	(Belgium) Stoffel Vandoorne	DS	27	+44.961	12	
12	8	(Spain) Roberto Merhi	Mahindra	27	+1:05.048	19	
13	33	(United Kingdom) Dan Ticktum	NIO	27	+1:34.800	18	
Ret	58	(Germany) René Rast	McLaren-Nissan	15	Mechanical	5	
Ret	10	(United Kingdom) Sam Bird	Jaguar	8	Collision	2	
Ret	16	(Switzerland) Sébastien Buemi	Envision-Jaguar	8	Collision	4	
Ret	13	(Portugal) António Félix da Costa	Porsche	8	Collision	13	
Ret	48	(Switzerland) Edoardo Mortara	Maserati	8	Collision	6	
Ret	11	(Brazil) Lucas di Grassi	Mahindra	8	Collision	15	
Ret	4	(Netherlands) Robin Frijns	ABT-Mahindra	8	Collision	17	
Ret	36	(Germany) André Lotterer	Andretti-Porsche	2	Accident	20	
DNS	5	(United Kingdom) Jake Hughes	McLaren-Nissan	0	Did not start		

Notes:

- ^1 – Pole position.
- ^2 – Fastest lap.

==== Standings after the race ====
Drivers' Championship standings

	Pos	Driver	Points
1	1	(New Zealand) Nick Cassidy	171
1	2	(United Kingdom) Jake Dennis	166
1	3	(New Zealand) Mitch Evans	151
1	4	(Germany) Pascal Wehrlein	140
	5	(France) Jean-Éric Vergne	107

Teams' Championship standings

	Pos	Constructor	Points
1	1	(United Kingdom) Envision-Jaguar	243
1	2	(Germany) Porsche	237
	3	(United Kingdom) Jaguar	213
	4	(United States) Andretti-Porsche	189
	5	(France) DS	149

- Notes: Only the top five positions are included for both sets of standings.

=== Race 2 ===
==== Qualifying ====
Qualifying for race 2 took place at 10:40 AM on 16 July.

Group draw
Group A	(New Zealand) CAS	(New Zealand) EVA	(France) JEV	(Portugal) DAC	(United Kingdom) BIR	(Belgium) VAN	(France) FEN	(Brazil) DIG	(United Kingdom) TIC	(Brazil) SET	(Netherlands) FRI
Group B	(United Kingdom) DEN	(Germany) WEH	(Germany) GUE	(Switzerland) BUE	(United Kingdom) HUG	(Germany) RAS	(France) NAT	(Germany) LOT	(Switzerland) MOR	(Switzerland) MUE	(Spain) MER

===== Qualifying duels =====
Quarter-finals
A3	(United Kingdom) Dan Ticktum
A2	(New Zealand) Nick Cassidy
A4	(New Zealand) Mitch Evans
A1	(United Kingdom) Sam Bird
B3	(France) Norman Nato
B2	(Switzerland) Sébastien Buemi
B4	(Germany) Maximilian Günther
B1	(United Kingdom) Jake Dennis

Semi-finals
(New Zealand) Nick Cassidy
(New Zealand) Mitch Evans
(France) Norman Nato
(United Kingdom) Jake Dennis

Final
(New Zealand) Nick Cassidy
(United Kingdom) Jake Dennis

===== Overall classification =====
Pos.	No.	Driver	Team	A	B	QF	SF	F	Grid
1	27	(United Kingdom) Jake Dennis	Andretti-Porsche	—N/a	1:38.214	1:38.179	1:38.087	1:37.986	1
2	37	(New Zealand) Nick Cassidy	Envision-Jaguar	1:38.547	—N/a	1:37.536	1:38.056	1:38.057	2
3	17	(France) Norman Nato	Nissan	—N/a	1:38.538	1:38.613	1:38.203	—N/a	3
4	9	(New Zealand) Mitch Evans	Jaguar	1:38.701	—N/a	1:37.946	1:38.322	—N/a	4
5	10	(United Kingdom) Sam Bird	Jaguar	1:38.434	—N/a	1:38.445	—N/a	—N/a	5
6	7	(Germany) Maximilian Günther	Maserati	—N/a	1:38.575	1:38.655	—N/a	—N/a	6
7	33	(United Kingdom) Dan Ticktum	NIO	1:38.697	—N/a	1:38.720	—N/a	—N/a	7
8	16	(Switzerland) Sébastien Buemi	Envision-Jaguar	—N/a	1:38.471	1:51.464	—N/a	—N/a	8
9	48	(Switzerland) Edoardo Mortara	Maserati	—N/a	1:38.598	—N/a	—N/a	—N/a	9
10	13	(Portugal) António Félix da Costa	Porsche	1:38.976	—N/a	—N/a	—N/a	—N/a	10
11	5	(United Kingdom) Jake Hughes	McLaren-Nissan	—N/a	1:38.677	—N/a	—N/a	—N/a	11
12	25	(France) Jean-Éric Vergne	DS	1:39.128	—N/a	—N/a	—N/a	—N/a	12
13	58	(Germany) René Rast	McLaren-Nissan	—N/a	1:38.825	—N/a	—N/a	—N/a	13
14	11	(Brazil) Lucas di Grassi	Mahindra	1:39.318	—N/a	—N/a	—N/a	—N/a	14
15	94	(Germany) Pascal Wehrlein	Porsche	—N/a	1:38.842	—N/a	—N/a	—N/a	15
16	3	(Brazil) Sérgio Sette Câmara	NIO	1:39.365	—N/a	—N/a	—N/a	—N/a	16
17	36	(Germany) André Lotterer	Andretti-Porsche	—N/a	1:38.932	—N/a	—N/a	—N/a	17
18	1	(Belgium) Stoffel Vandoorne	DS	1:39.366	—N/a	—N/a	—N/a	—N/a	18
19	51	(Switzerland) Nico Müller	ABT-Mahindra	—N/a	1:39.125	—N/a	—N/a	—N/a	19
20	4	(Netherlands) Robin Frijns	ABT-Mahindra	1:39.536	—N/a	—N/a	—N/a	—N/a	20
21	8	(Spain) Roberto Merhi	Mahindra	—N/a	1:40.289	—N/a	—N/a	—N/a	21
22	23	(France) Sacha Fenestraz	Nissan	No time (Note: Although Fenestraz failed to set a time in qualifying, he was permitted to race at the stewards' discretion.)	—N/a	—N/a	—N/a	—N/a	22

==== Race ====
Race 2 took place at 3:03 PM on 16 July.

Pos.	No.	Driver	Team	Laps	Time/Retired	Grid	Points
1	27	(United Kingdom) Jake Dennis	Andretti-Porsche	24	45:04.323	1	25+3^{1}+1^{2}
2	17	(France) Norman Nato	Nissan	24	+3.105	3	18
3	10	(United Kingdom) Sam Bird	Jaguar	24	+3.633	5	15
4	48	(Switzerland) Edoardo Mortara	Maserati	24	+4.357	9	12
5	16	(Switzerland) Sébastien Buemi	Envision-Jaguar	24	+5.004	8	10
6	7	(Germany) Maximilian Günther	Maserati	24	+5.403	6	8
7	94	(Germany) Pascal Wehrlein	Porsche	24	+11.586	15	6
8	1	(Belgium) Stoffel Vandoorne	DS	24	+11.951	18	4
9	33	(United Kingdom) Dan Ticktum	NIO	24	+12.563	7	2
10	51	(Switzerland) Nico Müller	ABT-Mahindra	24	+13.313	19	1
11	5	(United Kingdom) Jake Hughes	McLaren-Nissan	24	+14.507	11	
12	13	(Portugal) António Félix da Costa	Porsche	24	+18.034 (Note: da Costa received a 5-second time penalty for causing a collision with di Grassi.)	10	
13	58	(Germany) René Rast	McLaren-Nissan	24	+21.029	13	
14	37	(New Zealand) Nick Cassidy	Envision-Jaguar	24	+23.475 (Note: Cassidy received a 5-second time penalty for causing a collision with Lotterer.)	2	
15	25	(France) Jean-Éric Vergne	DS	24	+1:26.623	12	
16	23	(France) Sacha Fenestraz	Nissan	23	+1 Lap	22	
Ret	36	(Germany) André Lotterer	Andretti-Porsche	23	Collision	17	
Ret	3	(Brazil) Sérgio Sette Câmara	NIO	23	Battery voltage alert	16	
Ret	4	(Netherlands) Robin Frijns	ABT-Mahindra	18	Power loss	20	
Ret	8	(Spain) Roberto Merhi	Mahindra	12	Retired in pits	21	
Ret	11	(Brazil) Lucas di Grassi	Mahindra	12	Accident damage	14	
Ret	9	(New Zealand) Mitch Evans	Jaguar	4	Collision damage	4	

Notes:

- ^1 – Pole position.
- ^2 – Fastest lap.

==== Standings after the race ====
Drivers' Championship standings

	Pos	Driver	Points
1	1	(United Kingdom) Jake Dennis	195
1	2	(New Zealand) Nick Cassidy	171
	3	(New Zealand) Mitch Evans	151
	4	(Germany) Pascal Wehrlein	146
	5	(France) Jean-Éric Vergne	107

Teams' Championship standings

Pos	Constructor	Points
1	(United Kingdom) Envision-Jaguar	253
2	(Germany) Porsche	239
3	(United Kingdom) Jaguar	231
4	(United States) Andretti-Porsche	218
5	(France) DS	153

- Notes: Only the top five positions are included for both sets of standings.

== Notes ==
Previous race: 2023 Portland ePrix	FIA Formula E World Championship; 2022–23 season	Next race: 2023 London ePrix
Previous race: 2022 Rome ePrix	Rome ePrix	Next race: N/A
