= 2018 Rome ePrix =

Race 7 of 12 of the 2017–18 Formula E Championship
← Previous race	Next race →

Race details
- Date: 14 April 2018
- Official name: 2018 CBMM Niobium Rome E-Prix Presented By Mercedes EQ
- Location: Circuto Cittadino dell'EUR, Rome, Italy
- Course: Street circuit
- Course length: 2.860 km (1.777 mi)
- Distance: 33 laps, 94.38 km (58.65 mi)
- Weather: Dry but cloudy
- Attendance: 45,000

Pole position
Driver	(Sweden) Felix Rosenqvist	Mahindra
- Time: 1:36.311

Fastest lap
Driver	(Germany) Daniel Abt	Audi
- Time: 1:37.910 on lap 30

Podium
First	(United Kingdom) Sam Bird	Virgin-Citroën
Second	(Brazil) Lucas di Grassi	Audi
Third	(Germany) André Lotterer	Techeetah-Renault

The 2018 Rome ePrix (formally the 2018 CBMM Niobium Rome E-Prix Presented By Mercedes EQ) was a Formula E electric car race held at the Circuito Cittadino dell'EUR in the EUR residential and business district of the Italian capital of Rome on 14 April 2018 before a crowd of 45,000 people. It was the seventh round of the 2017–18 Formula E Championship and the inaugural running of the event. The 33-lap race was won by Virgin driver Sam Bird from a second position start. Lucas di Grassi finished second for Audi and Techeetah driver André Lotterer took third.

Felix Rosenqvist of Mahindra won the pole position by recording the fastest lap in qualifying and maintained the lead through the mandatory pit stops for the change into a second car until he hit a kerb on the 22nd lap and retired with a broken rear-left suspension. That allowed Bird into the lead but he was challenged by Jaguar's Mitch Evans, who had made a pit stop one lap later and had more electrical energy, with four laps left but he could not get ahead. Evans was then passed by di Grassi and Lotterer in the final laps as his energy depleted and Bird held off di Grassi to take his second victory of the season and the seventh of his career.

The result allowed Jean-Éric Vergne of Techeetah to retain his lead in the Drivers' Championship but his points advantage was reduced to 18 as Bird's victory put him ahead of Rosenqvist. e.Dams-Renault driver Sébastien Buemi maintained fourth and di Grassi's teammate Daniel Abt moved into fifth after coming fourth. Techeetah extended their advantage in the Teams' Championship to thirty-eight points over Virgin. Mahindra scored no points and fell to third with five races left in the season.

== Background ==
=== Preview ===
Coming into the race from Punta del Este four weeks earlier, Techeetah driver Jean-Éric Vergne led the Drivers' Championship with 109 points and was 30 points ahead of Felix Rosenqvist of Mahindra in second. Virgin's Sam Bird was a further three points behind in third and Sébastien Buemi of e.Dams-Renault was fourth with a total of 52 points accrued. Jaguar driver Nelson Piquet Jr. was fifth with 45 points. Techeetah led the Teams' Championship with 127 points; Mahindra followed 27 points behind in second position. Virgin (93 points) and Jaguar (86) were third and fourth and e.Dams-Renault were fifth with 59 points. There were ten teams fielding two drivers each for a total of 20 participants for the event.

After the world governing body of motorsport, the Fédération Internationale de l'Automobile (FIA), abolished the minimum pit stop time at the Santiago ePrix three races ago, Techeetah and Dragon were fined for modifying their seat felts and André Lotterer (Techeetah) clipped one of his mechanics in Mexico. These events prompted the FIA to hand all teams two cameras to aid the stewards in analysing footage after the race and were instructed to install them above the second car of their respective drivers and be positioned in an unobstructed area of the garage effective from the Rome ePrix. Jean Todt, the FIA president, reiterated his position that the responsibility of ensuring safe pit stops laid solely with teams and drivers and revealed that the decision to discard the minimum pit stop time was made following two years of research, "If you want to try and save time and to be unbuckled before you stop, [or] to buckle after you have started – you will be reported to the stewards to make some strong decisions. But if you follow the rules and the procedure, I feel that there is no problem of safety. I hope that every driver and every team will be responsible and we shouldn't have any problems."

=== Preparations ===
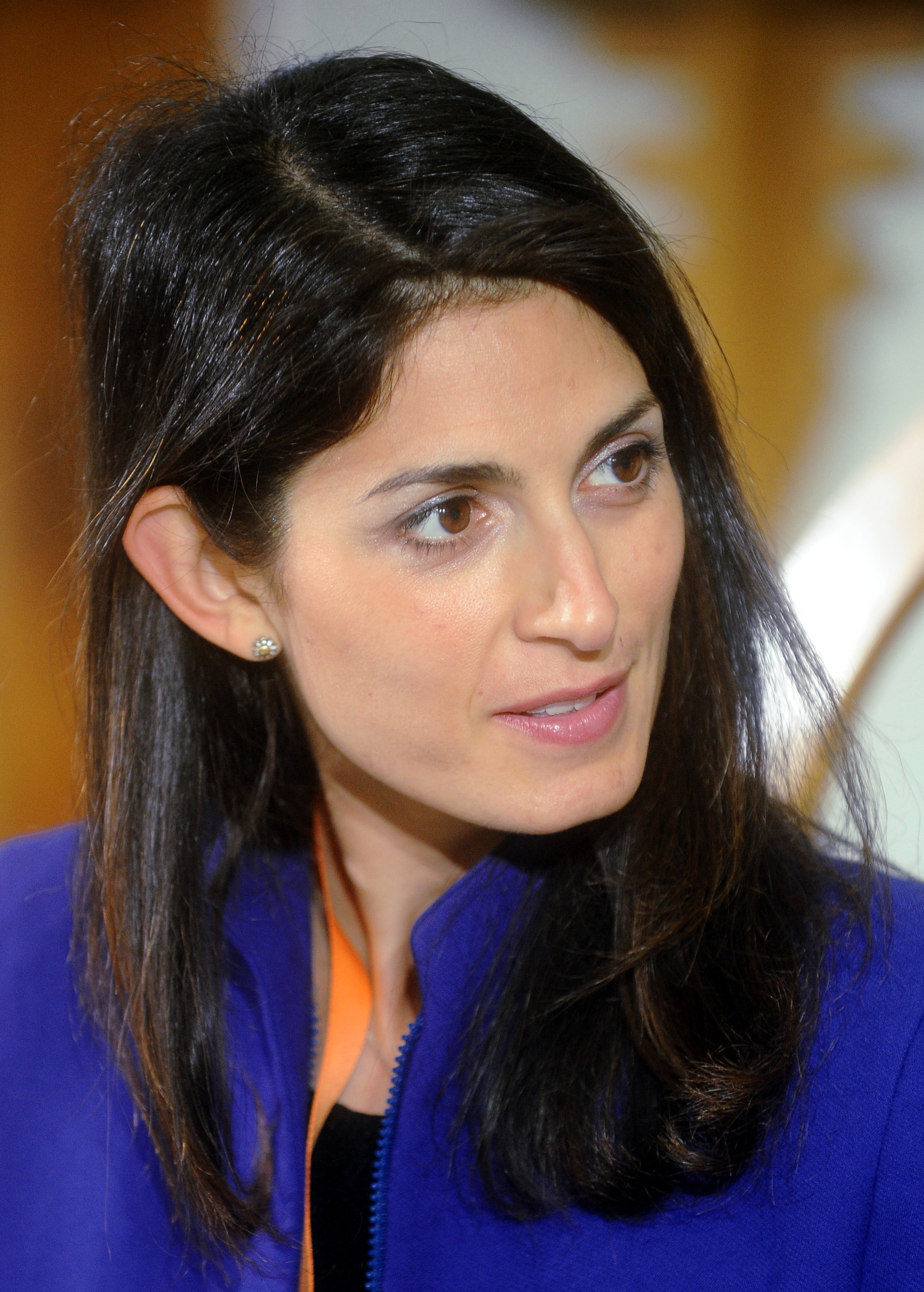
Virginia Raggi (pictured in 2016) was instrumental in getting Rome onto the Formula E calendar after the city's previous administration abandoned the plan.

Plans for a Formula E race around the streets of the Italian capital of Rome were discussed on 1 December 2012 by Todt, and series founder and CEO Alejandro Agag with Gianni Alemanno, the mayor. They agreed to hold a race in the city in the 2014–15 Championship. On 1 October 2013 however, these plans changed when the initial season calendar was released, dropping the Rome race with Hong Kong. A new administration had been elected in the intervening period of time and it decided against taking further action in restoring the ePrix to the calendar. But, the project was revitalised when in November 2016, Rome's councillor for sports Daniele Frongia told news agency Agenzia Nazionale Stampa Associata that the recently elected administration of Virginia Raggi was in the process of planning for major events slated for 2017 and 2018. Raggi maintained written correspondence with the FIA concerning the restoration of Rome to the Formula E calendar.

After a meeting of councillors at Rome City Hall, Agag met Raggi and a congregation of city officials in February 2017 to discuss a series of requests and evaluated a potential circuit. The group held another meeting a few weeks later for further negotiation. Two months later on 20 April, the proposal for a motor race on the streets of Rome was put forward to authorities from the local assembly who voted unanimously in favour to approve permits to allow racing in the city's EUR residential and business district for the next five years. The ePrix was added to the FIA's provisional 2017–18 calendar on 19 June, and was officially confirmed as part of the series by the FIA World Motor Sport Council three months later. It was the seventh of twelve scheduled single seater electric car rounds of the 2017–18 Championship and occurred at the Circuito Cittadino dell'EUR street circuit on 18 April 2018. Prior to the ePrix, Rome last hosted a street circuit race at the Baths of Caracalla in 1951. Organisers expected 30,000 people to attend the ePrix.

The layout of the 21-turn 2.86 km (1.78 mi) street circuit was unveiled to the public on 19 October 2017. It was the second longest track on the Formula E calendar after the Circuit International Automobile Moulay El Hassan in Marrakesh. The start line was positioned on the Via Cristoforo Colombo and the finish line was positioned near the Marconi Obelisk. The circuit negotiated past major city buildings such as the Rome Convection Center and the Palazzo dei Congressi. Construction of the track began on 3 April, eleven days before the ePrix, and was completed on 12 April. It was dismantled two days after the race. The circuit received a mixed response. Lucas di Grassi (Audi) disliked the chicane while Nick Heidfeld (Mahindra) believed the turn would be more challenging than it appeared. Nico Prost of e.Dams-Renault felt that turns four and five would provide a great amount of challenge and it reminded him of the Montreal Street Circuit. However, several drivers raised concerns over the position of the starting grid. Di Grassi argued it should have been placed after turn two while Heidfeld doubted that moving the start line would make any significant difference.

== Practice ==
Two practice sessions—both on Saturday morning—were held before the late afternoon race. The first session ran for 45 minutes and the second lasted half an hour. A half an hour untimed shakedown session was held on Friday afternoon to enable teams to check the reliability of their cars and electronic systems. Piquet incurred a suspended three place grid penalty for exceeding the maximum amount of permitted laps (six) during shakedown and a repeat transgression before the session ended would require him to serve it. In the first practice session, held in relatively cold weather, Piquet set the fastest time of 1 minute, 36.134 seconds lap, followed by Bird, Mitch Evans (Jaguar), Vergne, Buemi, Lotterer, Rosenqvist, Jérôme d'Ambrosio (Dragon), di Grassi and Alex Lynn (Virgin). During the session, several drivers were caught out by the track and some including Lotterer ventured onto its run-off areas as they learnt the limits of the track and finding a rhythm they liked. José María López (Dragon) glanced the turn five barrier and damaged his car's rear-right corner. Lynn ended the session five minutes prematurely with a slide at a 45-degree angle into the turn one barrier, deranging his front-left suspension. Rosenqvist led for most of the second session and recorded a 200 kW (270 hp) lap late on of 1 minute, 35.467 seconds. He was three-tenths of a second faster than the second-placed Bird. Di Grassi, López, Prost, Buemi, d'Ambrosio, Piquet, Tom Blomqvist (Andretti) and Evans were in third to tenth. With five minutes left, Lynn crashed for the second time when he lost control of the rear of his car approaching the turn sixteen/seventeen chicane because of an overspeed that sent him into an outside barrier sideways with the left hand side of his vehicle. Lynn was unhurt but the crash significantly damaged his car and ended the session early due to the limited amount of available time.

== Qualifying ==
Saturday's afternoon one hour qualifying session was divided into four groups of five cars. Each group was determined by a lottery system and was permitted six minutes of on-track activity. All drivers were limited to two timed laps with one at maximum power. The fastest five overall competitors in all four groups participated in a "Super Pole" session with one driver on the track at any time going out in reverse order from fifth to first. Each of the five drivers was limited to one timed lap and the starting order was determined by the competitor's fastest times (Super Pole from first to fifth, and group qualifying from sixth to twentieth). The driver and team who recorded the fastest time were awarded three points towards their respective championships.

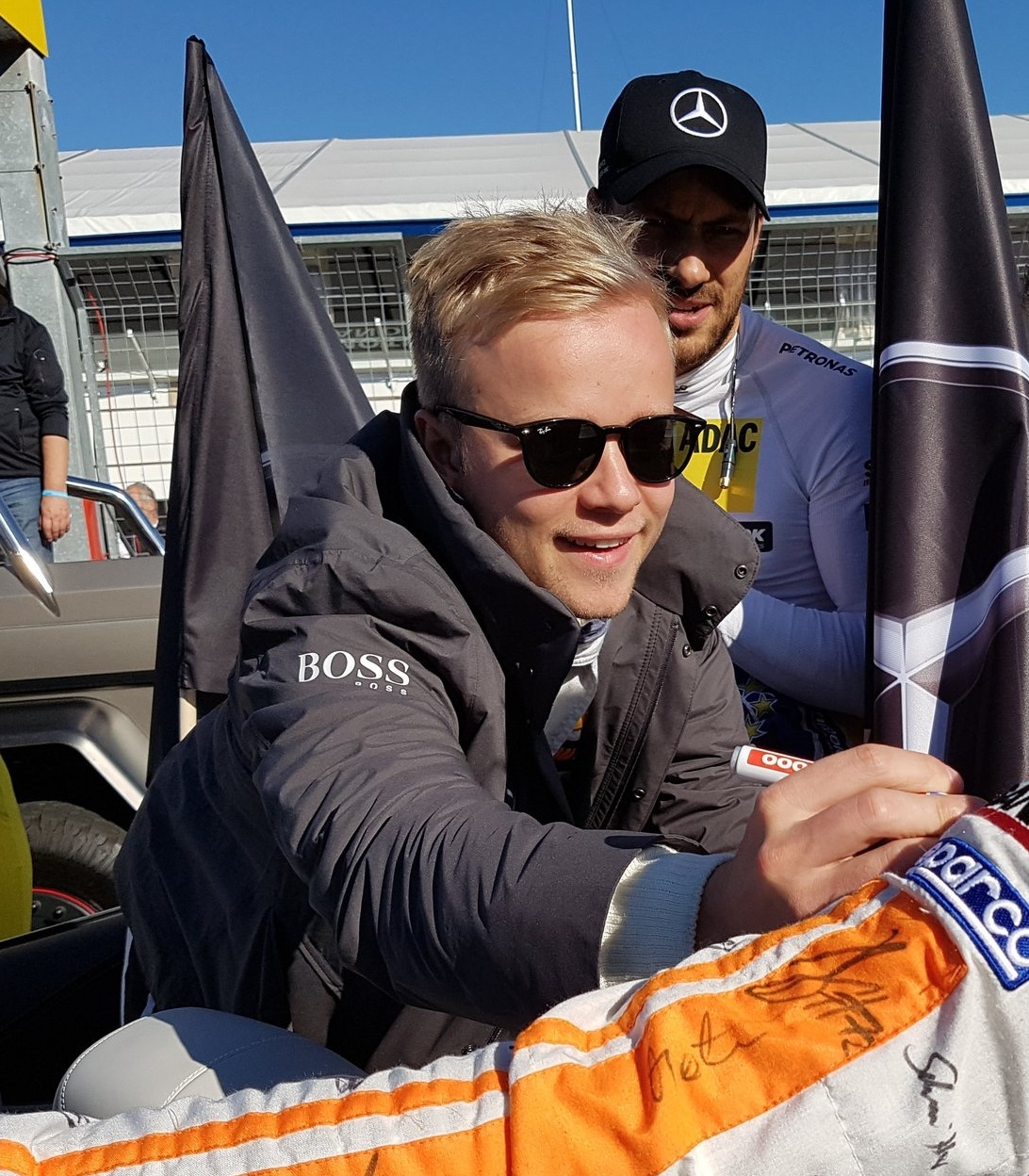
Felix Rosenqvist (pictured in 2016) took his third pole position of the season and the sixth of his career.

In the first group of five drivers, Blomqvist was the early pace setter and was followed by Maro Engel (Venturi) and Prost. Both Luca Filippi (NIO) and d'Ambrosio set one timed warm-up lap as the duo crossed the timing team after the first group ended due to a mistimed run that prevented them from recording a lap at maximum power. Rosenqvist immediately went the fastest of anyone in the track's first sector and topped group two. Buemi followed in second with Bird third and Vergne fourth. Piquet struggled with the tight track and was the second group's slowest driver. In the third group, Evans was the fastest competitor and put himself amongst the top five overall runners as he eliminated Vergne from super pole. Di Grassi was second-quickest with Oliver Turvey (NIO) third and Daniel Abt (Audi) fourth. The third group's slowest driver Edoardo Mortara (Venturi) made contact with a wall leaving the Obelisk chicane and broke his rear-left suspension and steering arm, causing him to fight for control of his car for the rest of his lap.

Before the final group commenced, a miscommunication caused López to be released from his garage at the wrong time and hit the sidepod of António Félix da Costa's Andretti car at low speed. López was consequently pushed into a wall because he could not steer away from Félix da Costa. Both cars sustained suspension damage and neither López nor Félix da Costa set a lap time as Formula E regulations obliged teams to nominate one of the driver's two cars for use in qualifying. Lotterer surprised all by setting the fastest overall group stage lap of 1 minute, 36.593 seconds by gaining four-tenths of a second in the circuit's final sector after two previous average sector times on its last lap. Heidfeld drove tidily on his lap to place second and Lynn was third. At the end of group qualifying, the lap times set by Lotterer, Rosenqvist, Buemi, Bird and Evans qualified them into super pole. Although Rosenqvist glanced a barrier with his right-rear wheel leaving the Obelisk chicane, he took his third pole position of the season and the sixth of his career with a time of 1 minute, 36.311 seconds. He was joined on the grid's front row by Bird who had the pole until Rosenqvist's lap. Evans, third, locked his tyres at turn nine, battled for control of his car over the bumps while braking for the turn 13 hairpin. Lotterer could not replicate his group qualifying performance due to a lack of tyre cooling and was fourth after losing four-tenths of a second in the first sector. Buemi appeared to win pole by going fastest early on but an error with the retardation of his regenerative system entering turn 13 put him deep after missing his braking point on the bumpy track and started fifth.

=== Post-qualifying ===
Andretti were issued a €10,000 fine as the stewards deemed them to have released Félix da Costa's car "in an unsafe manner and [da Costa] then collided with car number six that was approaching in the fast lane.” Félix da Costa (penalised ten grid positions for the afternoon's race), López, Filippi and d'Ambrosio (also dropped two places on the grid for passing the chequered flag twice) were granted permission by the stewards to start the race. After the application of penalties, the rest of the order consisted of di Grassi, Turvey, Vergne, Abt, Heidfeld, Lynn, Blomqvist, Piquet, Engel, Prost, Mortara, Filippi, d'Ambrosio, López and Félix da Costa

=== Qualifying classification ===
Final qualifying classification
Pos.	No.	Driver	Team	GS	SP	Grid
1	19	(Sweden) Felix Rosenqvist	Mahindra	1:36.683	1:36.311	1
2	2	(United Kingdom) Sam Bird	Virgin-Citroën	1:36.901	1:36.987	2
3	20	(New Zealand) Mitch Evans	Jaguar	1:36.911	1.37.199	3
4	18	(Germany) André Lotterer	Techeetah-Renault	1:36.593	1:37.235	4
5	9	(Switzerland) Sébastien Buemi	e.Dams-Renault	1:36.732	1:37.817	5
6	1	(Brazil) Lucas di Grassi	Audi	1:36.973	—N/a	6
7	16	(United Kingdom) Oliver Turvey	NIO	1:37.045	—N/a	7
8	25	(France) Jean-Éric Vergne	Techeetah-Renault	1:37.055	—N/a	8
9	66	(Germany) Daniel Abt	Audi	1:37.117	—N/a	9
10	23	(Germany) Nick Heidfeld	Mahindra	1:37.365	—N/a	10
11	36	(United Kingdom) Alex Lynn	Virgin-Citroën	1:37.546	—N/a	11
12	27	(United Kingdom) Tom Blomqvist	Andretti-BMW	1:37.561	—N/a	12
13	3	(Brazil) Nelson Piquet Jr.	Jaguar	1:38.066	—N/a	13
14	5	(Germany) Maro Engel	Venturi	1:38.212	—N/a	14
15	8	(France) Nico Prost	e.Dams-Renault	1:38.410	—N/a	15
16	7	(Belgium) Jérôme d'Ambrosio	Dragon-Penske	1:42.003	—N/a	18^{1}
17	4	(Switzerland) Edoardo Mortara	Venturi	1:47.802	—N/a	16
18	68	(Italy) Luca Filippi	NIO	2:09.829	—N/a	17^{2}
19	6	(Argentina) José María López	Dragon-Penske	—	—N/a	19^{2}
20	28	(Portugal) António Félix da Costa	Andretti-BMW	—	—N/a	20^{1}^{2}

Notes:

- ^1— Jérôme d'Ambrosio was demoted two places on the grid for passing the chequered flag twice while António Félix da Costa was penalised ten positions for causing a collision in the pit lane.
- ^2— Luca Filippi, José María López and António Félix da Costa were granted dispensation to start the race.

== Race ==
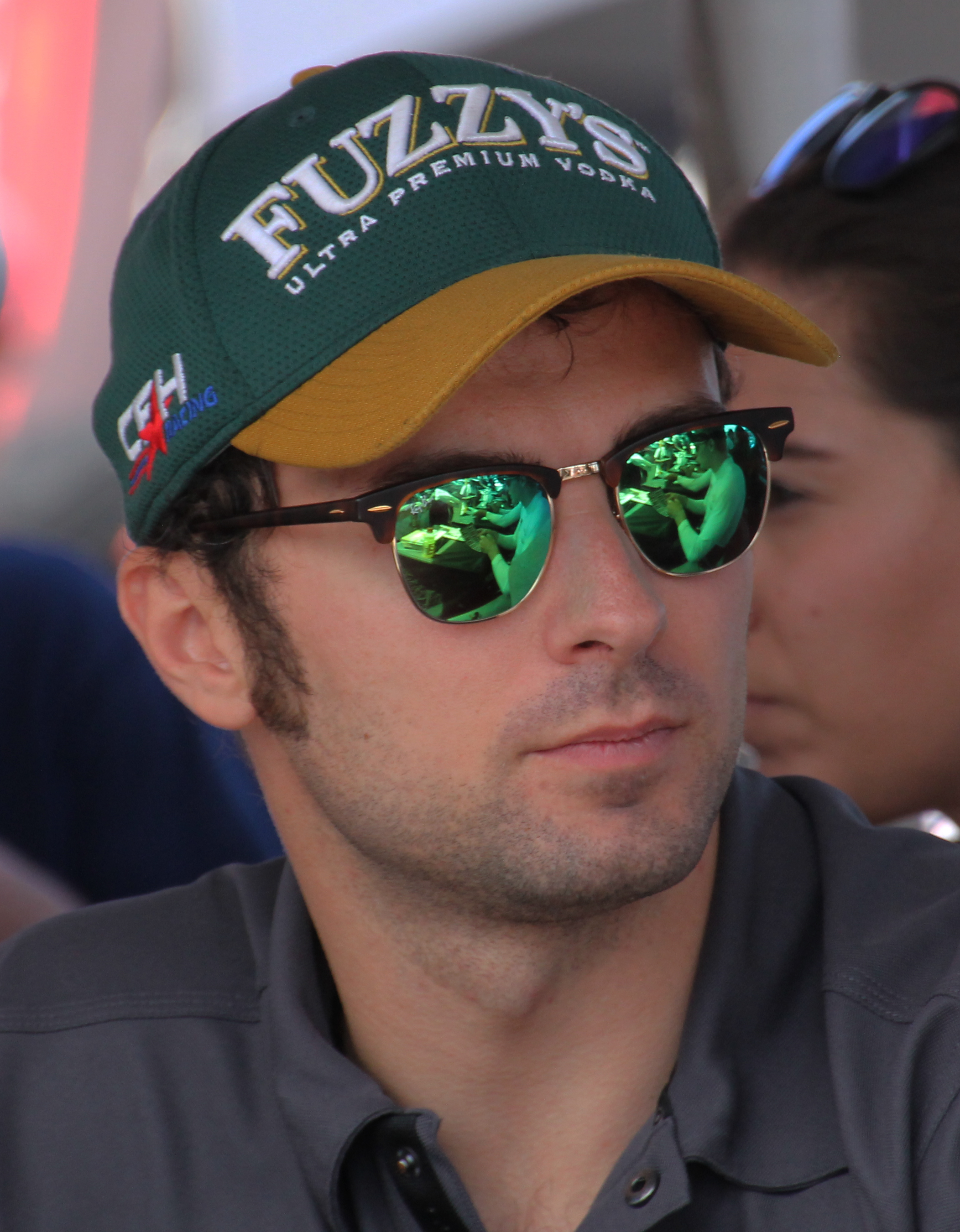
Local driver Luca Filippi (pictured in 2015) was one of the three winners of the FanBoost vote and got caught up in a four-car pile-up on lap sixteen.

The race began before a crowd of 45,000 people at 16;00 Central European Summer Time (UTC−02:00). The weather at the start was dry but cloudy with the air temperature between 25.05 to 26.25 °C (77.09 to 79.25 °F) and the track temperature ranged from 24 and 26 °C (75 and 79 °F). A special feature of Formula E is the "Fan Boost" feature, an additional 100 kW (130 hp) of power to use in the driver's second car. The three drivers who were allowed to use the boost were determined by a fan vote. On the grid, Rosenqvist spun his tyres and turned left to stop Bird from passing him. That allowed Evans to try and pass the pair on the inside, only to slide wide and return to third. Meanwhile, Turvey made a brisk start from seventh to pass di Grassi and Buemi on the outside for fifth. As the field approached the second turn, Lynn mounted the rear of Vergne's car, damaging both cars' bodywork with Lynn shown a black flag with an orange disc to dictate he enter the pit lane for repairs. Engel and Félix da Costa gained three places by the end of the first lap, while Blomqvist lost the same amount of positions over the same distance.

The gaps in the top ten stabilised as Rosenqvist began to build a small advantage over Bird. Further back, Félix da Costa continued to move up the order by getting ahead of Filippi and Mortara followed through. Yet, Mortara abandoned his attempt at steering back onto the racing line as López occupiee the space and the former was briefly sideways. López could not find any room to overtake him but untangled with Mortara before entering the hairpin. Buemi, di Grassi and Filippi were announced as the winners of the FanBoost vote on the fourth lap. Soon after, López almost completed a double overtake on Filippi and Prost which saw his axle interconnect as he moved past Filippi but reached the apex of the corner, allowing Prost to keep fourteenth for the time being. At the front, Rosenqvist had extended his lead over Bird to three seconds, which remained about the same until the former responded to set consecutive fastest laps and close the gap before the mandatory pit stops to change into a second car. Buemi pressured Turvey and got past him for fifth on lap 15. He then began drawing closer to the fourth-placed Lotterer and was right behind him within one lap. An overtaking attempt by Buemi on Lotterer resulted in minor contact but both sustained no damage.

Entering the pit stop window, Evans and Lotterer had seven per cent more electrical energy than the top two and fell back so they could remain on track for one extra lap while di Grassi and Vergne also conserved energy. As the pit stops drew nearer, localised yellow flags were necessitated for a four-car pileup at the turn 13 hairpin on lap 16. Heidfeld was close to Turvey; the two collided into the hairpin and the former hit a barrier. López on the inside pushed Turvey into Heidfeld. Then, Turvey's teammate Filippi attempted to pass Mortara and rammed into the rear of his car with Mortara following suit. All four drivers were able to continue. Meanwhile, Félix da Costa made the first pit stop of the race on the lap. Rosenqvist and Bird came in simultaneously with the former retaining the lead. After the pit stops, Buemi moved past Evans for third and di Grassi was close behind Lotterer in fifth as the full course yellow procedure was activated for Lynn who was stranded in the turn ten run-off area after a crash on lap 18. Then, Piquet became the second retiree after stopping his car with an unrectifiable seat belt problem.

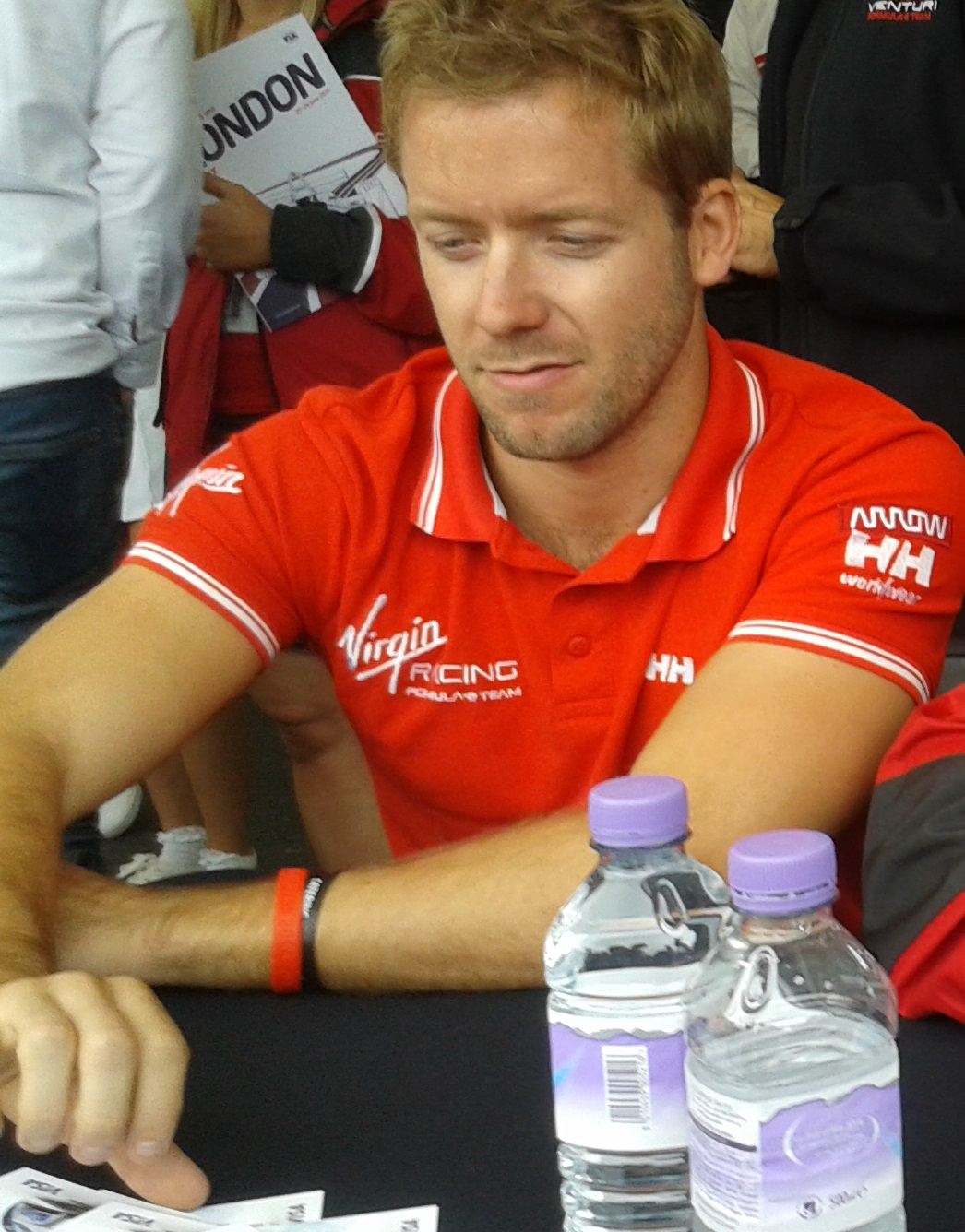
Sam Bird (pictured in 2015) took his second victory of the season and the seventh of his career after Rosenqvist retired with suspension failure.

Once racing resumed, Bird in second was still close behind Rosenqvist in the lead and Evans passed Buemi for third place. On lap 22 Bird took the lead as Rosenqvist drove over the turn 17 kerbs and broke his car's rear-left suspension assembly and drive shaft. It was initially attributed to an aggressive driving style but it was later traced to a loose bolt. Rosenqvist pulled up at the side of the track to retire. Race control activated the second full course yellow procedure to allow marshals to move Rosenqvist's car to a safe location. Meanwhile, di Grassi passed Lotterer, and soon after, used his FanBoost to overtake Buemi on the inside cresting a hill for third on lap 24. He began to gain on Evans, who in turn, was drawing nearer to Bird by having more electrical energy. As the battle for the lead commenced, Buemi defended from Lotterer, allowing Abt and Vergne to duel them. Although Lotterer was conscious over conserving electrical energy, he overtook Buemi at turn five on lap 26.

Abt lacked access to energy readouts due to a radio failure in his second car, but made a similar overtaking attempt on the outside of Buemi entering the hairpin on the lap. Vergne temporarily took sixth and fifth away from Abt and Buemi two laps later before going deep at the hairpin. Evans used his electrical energy advantage to challenge Bird into turn nine for the lead on lap 29 but Bird defended by steering right. Abt earned one point for setting the race's fastest lap of 1 minute and 37.910 seconds on lap 30, and passed Buemi at turn nine soon after. Vergne then overtook Buemi on the inside heading towards turn three. Evans used his extra electrical energy to close up to Bird and had neither slowed nor regenerated for energy conservation purposes, leaving him vulnerable to di Grassi and Lotterer. This enabled Bird to open up a small lead and di Grassi got by Evans for second place at turn nine with three laps left. Lotterer then tried to pass Evans driving towards turn nine. Evans held third as Lotterer was alongside him going into the Obelisk chicane but Evans kept the place by out-braking him.

With two laps left, López tagged the rear of Mortara's car, damaging the latter's rear wing and causing the former to retire with suspension damage. The full course yellow was not activated on the final lap because López stopped his car in a place where he would not obstruct anyone. This proved detrimental to Evans as he had five per cent of electrical energy left while Lotterer had two per cent more. Lotterer turned left to pass Evans at turn ten for third. Evans then slowed due to electrical energy depletion. Di Grassi's conservative strategy drew him nearer to Bird but was not close enough to affect an overtake and Bird earned his second victory of the season and the seventh of his career by 0.970 seconds. Lotterer was third and Abt fourth. Fifth-placed Vergne sprained his thumb at his pit stop which left him unable to attack the left-hand turns for fear of oversteering into a barrier. Buemi, d'Ambrosio, Engel, Evans, Mortara, Félix da Costa, Turvey, Filippi, Prost, Blomqvist, Heidfeld and López were the final classified finishers.

=== Post-race ===
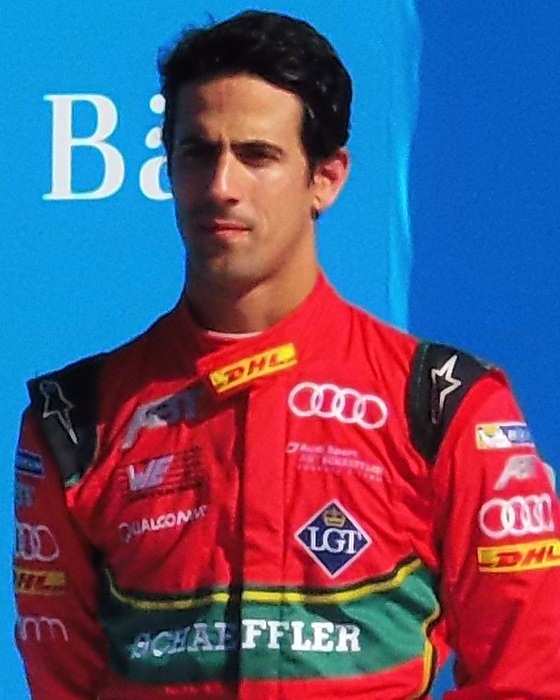
Second-placed Lucas di Grassi (pictured in 2017) was cleared of wrongdoing during an investigation into his pit stop.

The top three drivers appeared on the podium to collect their trophies and spoke to the media in a later press conference. Bird admitted that he may have not won the race had Rosenqvist retired with suspension damage and stated a driving error on his part allowed Evans and di Grassi to close up on him, "I knew they'd be hunting on the last lap but I tried to give myself the best scenario and held on." He stated he would take a race-by-race approach until New York City when he would read into the points standings, "I’ve just got to do the best job I can and then we’ll see when we get to New York where we were strong last year." Di Grassi called the race "extraordinary", and although he did not expect to draw close to Buemi at the start, he was delighted to finish second. He hoped to contend for the win in every race until the season ended. Third-place finisher Lotterer admitted that he was still learning Formula E and on how luck changes hands in the series, "I saved a bit too much energy and the performance was good, but I learned a lot again today and I'm happy to be on the podium... I'm getting it bit by bit."

Rosenqvist's retirement from the lead was his second in three races after a battery failure lost him the Mexico City ePrix. He described the race as a "perfect day in every sense" and vowed to return to contention, "We're all quite tired and I think the guys deserved a win today – that's going to be hard for everyone but we're going to come back." Evans said the second full course yellow stopped him from securing his second podium finish of the season and was aware his sole opportunity to pass Bird was missed, "It spiralled out of control very, very quick. I’ll take it on the chin. The guys did a great job, and I feel bad for the team. We could have easily got a podium. Maybe we were just a little bit impatient, but it's my first time racing for the win in this championship." Concerning the lap 16 four-car pileup at the hairpin, Turvey called it "unfortunate" and said he could not avoid it from occurring. Heidfeld argued since Turvey depleted electrical energy, possibly due to excess frontal brake bias, he was rendered unable to steer. Heidfeld said he would discuss the crash with Turvey.

Towards the end of the race, di Grassi was investigated by the stewards for the placement of his mechanics' hands at his mid-race car change pit stop. Di Grassi was later summoned to the stewards where footage of his pit stop was re-examined for clarification and Audi were cleared of any wrongdoing when they demonstrated their procedure was legal. Di Grassi subsequently called for technology to have a greater involvement to allow for consistent instructions and decisions could be enforced and lower the stewards' workload. e.Dams-Renault team principal Jean-Paul Driot explained Buemi had Bird's strategy but his battle with Turvey obliged him to attack too much. Driot believed an alternative strategy of one extra lap could have been adopted had Buemi began on the grid's front row. The unbuckling of Piquet's seat belt in his second car was one of several incidents involving the safety device and a similar issue affected Abt in Punta del Este. He revealed that his team decided to retire him because the problem took too long to rectify and they wanted to conserve equipment, "It's pretty clear, these cars are not made for quick pit stops and everyone is taking risks as there's no minimum time.”

The result kept Vergne the lead of the Drivers' Championship but his advantage was reduced to 18 points. Bird's victory moved him to second place and Rosenqvist's retirement demoted him to third. Buemi maintained fourth position while Abt took over fifth position by finishing sixth. In the Teams' Championship, Techeetah extended their advantage over Virgin (who gained second place from Mahindra) at the top to 34 points. Mahindra scored no points and dropped to third while Audi's strong result moved them from sixth to fourth. Jaguar scored two points courtesy of Evans but fell to fifth with five races left in the season.

=== Race classification ===
Drivers who scored championship points are denoted in bold.

Final race classification
Pos.	No.	Driver	Team	Laps	Time/Retired	Grid	Points
1	**2**	**(United Kingdom) Sam Bird**	**Virgin-Citroën**	**33**	**58:20.656**	**2**	25
2	**1**	**(Brazil) Lucas di Grassi**	**Audi**	**33**	**+0.970**	**6**	18
3	**18**	**(Germany) André Lotterer**	**Techeetah-Renault**	**33**	**+9.518**	**4**	15
4	**66**	**(Germany) Daniel Abt**	**Audi**	**33**	**+10.167**	**9**	12+1^{3}
5	**25**	**(France) Jean-Éric Vergne**	**Techeetah-Renault**	**33**	**+17.444**	**8**	10
6	**9**	**(Switzerland) Sébastien Buemi**	**e.Dams-Renault**	**33**	**+19.835**	**5**	8
7	**7**	**(Belgium) Jérôme d'Ambrosio**	**Dragon-Penske**	**33**	**+24.379**	**18**	6
8	**5**	**(Germany) Maro Engel**	**Venturi**	**33**	**+26.350**	**14**	4
9	**20**	**(New Zealand) Mitch Evans**	**Jaguar**	**33**	**+37.709**	**3**	2
10	**4**	**(Switzerland) Edoardo Mortara**	**Venturi**	**33**	**+40.739**	**16**	1
**11**	28	(Portugal) António Félix da Costa	Andretti-BMW	33	+42.680	20	
**12**	16	(United Kingdom) Oliver Turvey	NIO	33	+48.833	7	
**13**	68	(Italy) Luca Filippi	NIO	33	+49.331	17	
**14**	8	(France) Nico Prost	e.Dams-Renault	33	+1.13.880	15	
**15**	27	(United Kingdom) Tom Blomqvist	Andretti-BMW	33	+1.31.382	12	
**16**	23	(Germany) Nick Heidfeld	Mahindra	33	+1:44.774	10	
**17**	6	(Argentina) José María López	Dragon-Penske	29	Throttle/Suspension	19	
Ret	**19**	**(Sweden) Felix Rosenqvist**	**Mahindra**	**22**	**Suspension**	**1**	3^{4}
Ret	3	(Brazil) Nelson Piquet Jr.	Jaguar	18	Seat belt	13	
Ret	36	(United Kingdom) Alex Lynn	Virgin-Citroën	15	Accident	11	

Notes:

- **^3** — One point for fastest lap.
- **^4** — Three points for pole position.

== Standings after the race ==
Drivers' Championship standings

+/–	Pos	Driver	Points
	1	(France) Jean-Éric Vergne	119
1	2	(United Kingdom) Sam Bird	101 (−18)
1	3	(Sweden) Felix Rosenqvist	82 (−37)
	4	(Switzerland) Sébastien Buemi	60 (−59)
2	5	(Germany) Daniel Abt	50 (−69)

Teams' Championship standings

+/–	Pos	Constructor	Points
	1	(China) Techeetah-Renault	152
1	2	(United Kingdom) Virgin-Citroën	118 (−34)
1	3	(India) Mahindra	103 (−49)
2	4	(Germany) Audi	89 (−63)
1	5	(United Kingdom) Jaguar	88 (−64)

- Notes: Only the top five positions are included for both sets of standings.

Previous race: 2018 Punta del Este ePrix	FIA Formula E Championship; 2017–18 season	Next race: 2018 Paris ePrix
Previous race: N/A	Rome ePrix	Next race: 2019 Rome ePrix
