= 2022 Mexico City ePrix =

Race 3 of 16 of the 2021–22 Formula E season
← Previous race	Next race →

Race details
- Date: 12 February 2022
- Official name: 2022 Mexico City E-Prix
- Location: Autódromo Hermanos Rodríguez, Mexico City
- Course: Permanent racing facility
- Course length: 2.606 km (1.619 mi)
- Distance: 40 laps, 104.240 km (64.772 mi)
- Weather: Dry

Pole position
Driver	(Germany) Pascal Wehrlein	Porsche
- Time: 1:07.100

Fastest lap
Driver	(Brazil) Lucas di Grassi (Netherlands) Nyck de Vries (Note: De Vries received the point for fastest lap as Di Grassi failed to finish in the top 10.)	Venturi-Mercedes; Mercedes
- Time: 1:09.487 (1:09.877) on lap 12 (21)

Podium
First	(Germany) Pascal Wehrlein	Porsche
Second	(Germany) André Lotterer	Porsche
Third	(France) Jean-Éric Vergne	Techeetah-DS

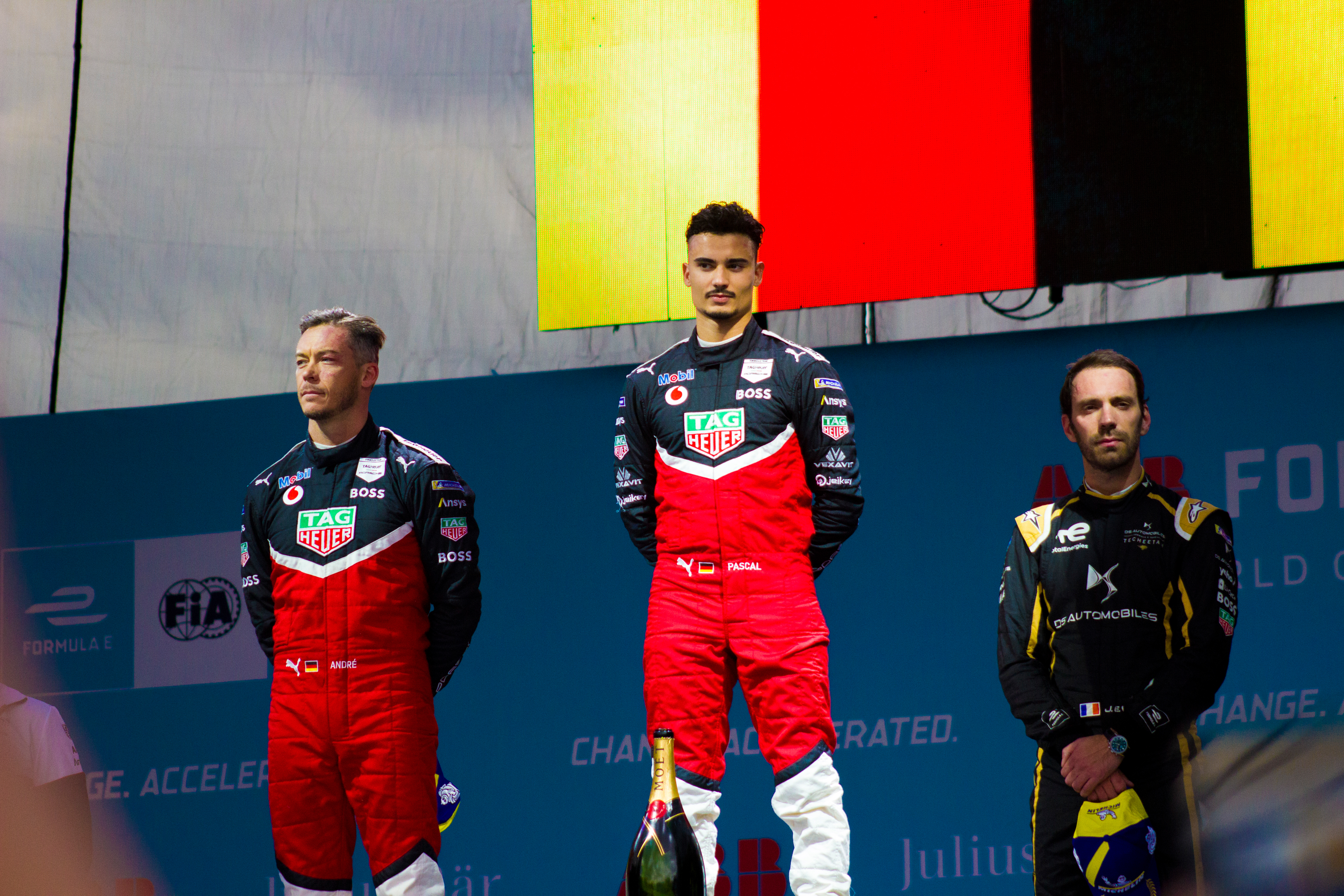
Pascal Wehrlein (center) scored his first official Formula E race win. His teammate André Lotterer (left) finished in second place, while Jean-Éric Vergne (right) finished third.

The 2022 Mexico City ePrix was a Formula E electric car race held at the Autódromo Hermanos Rodríguez in the centre of Mexico City on 12 February 2022. It served as the third round of the 2021–22 Formula E season and the sixth edition of the event, and marked a return to the venue after it was used as a field hospital for COVID-19 patients, and subsequently replaced by the Puebla ePrix in 2021.

Pascal Wehrlein won the race from pole to claim his and his team's first ever Formula E victory, leading a Porsche 1-2 from teammate André Lotterer and Jean-Éric Vergne.

== Classification ==
=== Qualifying ===
Group draw
Group A	(Switzerland) MOR (1)	(Belgium) VAN (3)	(Brazil) DIG (5)	(Germany) LOT (7)	(France) JEV (9)	(United Kingdom) ROW (11)	(United States) ASK (13)	(Germany) GUE (15)	(Switzerland) BUE (17)	(Brazil) SET (19)	(United Kingdom) TUR (21)
Group B	(Netherlands) DEV (2)	(United Kingdom) DEN (4)	(Netherlands) FRI (6)	(United Kingdom) BIR (8)	(New Zealand) CAS (10)	(Germany) WEH (12)	(New Zealand) EVA (14)	(Portugal) DAC (16)	(United Kingdom) SIM (18)	(United Kingdom) TIC (20)	(Italy) GIO (22)

==== Qualifying duels ====
Quarter-finals
B4	(Netherlands) Nyck de Vries
A1	(Germany) André Lotterer
B3	(Netherlands) Robin Frijns
A2	(Switzerland) Edoardo Mortara
A3	(France) Jean-Éric Vergne
B2	(Portugal) António Félix da Costa
A4	(Belgium) Stoffel Vandoorne
B1	(Germany) Pascal Wehrlein

Semi-finals
(Germany) André Lotterer
(Switzerland) Edoardo Mortara
(France) Jean-Éric Vergne
(Germany) Pascal Wehrlein

Final
(Switzerland) Edoardo Mortara
(Germany) Pascal Wehrlein

==== Overall classification ====
Pos.	No.	Driver	Team	A	B	QF	SF	F	Grid
1	94	(Germany) Pascal Wehrlein	Porsche	—N/a	1:07.780	1:07.299	1:07.035	1:07.100	1
2	48	(Switzerland) Edoardo Mortara	Venturi-Mercedes	1:07.784	—N/a	1:07.263	1:07.228	1:07.373	2
3	36	(Germany) André Lotterer	Porsche	1:07.675	—N/a	1:07.103	1:07.295	—N/a	3
4	25	(France) Jean-Éric Vergne	Techeetah-DS	1:07.955	—N/a	1:07.347	1:07.366	—N/a	4
5	13	(Portugal) António Félix da Costa	Techeetah-DS	—N/a	1:07.801	1:07.358	—N/a	—N/a	5
6	17	(Netherlands) Nyck de Vries	Mercedes	—N/a	1:07.900	1:07.367	—N/a	—N/a	6
7	4	(Netherlands) Robin Frijns	Envision-Audi	—N/a	1:07.811	1:07.672	—N/a	—N/a	7
8	5	(Belgium) Stoffel Vandoorne	Mercedes	1:08.001	—N/a	1:07.719	—N/a	—N/a	8
9	37	(New Zealand) Nick Cassidy	Envision-Audi	—N/a	1:07.904	—N/a	—N/a	—N/a	9
10	22	(Germany) Maximilian Günther	e.dams-Nissan	1:08.087	—N/a	—N/a	—N/a	—N/a	10
11	9	(New Zealand) Mitch Evans	Jaguar	—N/a	1:07.914	—N/a	—N/a	—N/a	11
12	28	(United States) Oliver Askew	Andretti-BMW	1:08.110	—N/a	—N/a	—N/a	—N/a	12
13	29	(United Kingdom) Alexander Sims	Mahindra	—N/a	1:07.938	—N/a	—N/a	—N/a	13
14	11	(Brazil) Lucas di Grassi	Venturi-Mercedes	1:08.129	—N/a	—N/a	—N/a	—N/a	14
15	27	(United Kingdom) Jake Dennis	Andretti-BMW	—N/a	1:08.042	—N/a	—N/a	—N/a	15
16	30	(United Kingdom) Oliver Rowland	Mahindra	1:08.139	—N/a	—N/a	—N/a	—N/a	16
17	10	(United Kingdom) Sam Bird	Jaguar	—N/a	1:08.174	—N/a	—N/a	—N/a	17
18	23	(Switzerland) Sébastien Buemi	e.dams-Nissan	1:08.230	—N/a	—N/a	—N/a	—N/a	18
19	99	(Italy) Antonio Giovinazzi	Dragon-Penske	—N/a	1:08.343	—N/a	—N/a	—N/a	19
20	7	(Brazil) Sérgio Sette Câmara	Dragon-Penske	1:08.256	—N/a	—N/a	—N/a	—N/a	20
21	33	(United Kingdom) Dan Ticktum	NIO	—N/a	1:08.561	—N/a	—N/a	—N/a	21
22	3	(United Kingdom) Oliver Turvey	NIO	1:08.691	—N/a	—N/a	—N/a	—N/a	22

=== Race ===
Pos.	No.	Driver	Team	Laps	Time/Retired	Grid	Points
1	94	(Germany) Pascal Wehrlein	Porsche	40	47:20.404	1	25+3^{1}
2	36	(Germany) André Lotterer	Porsche	40	+0.302	3	18
3	25	(France) Jean-Éric Vergne	Techeetah-DS	40	+9.051	4	15
4	13	(Portugal) António Félix da Costa	Techeetah-DS	40	+9.975	5	12
5	48	(Switzerland) Edoardo Mortara	Venturi-Mercedes	40	+18.356	2	10
6	17	(Netherlands) Nyck de Vries	Mercedes	40	+19.020	6	8+1^{2}
7	4	(Netherlands) Robin Frijns	Envision-Audi	40	+20.232	7	6
8	23	(Switzerland) Sébastien Buemi	e.dams-Nissan	40	+23.394	18	4
9	22	(Germany) Maximilian Günther	e.dams-Nissan	40	+26.497	10	2
10	27	(United Kingdom) Jake Dennis	Andretti-BMW	40	+26.829	15	1
11	5	(Belgium) Stoffel Vandoorne	Mercedes	40	+27.086	8	
12	11	(Brazil) Lucas di Grassi	Venturi-Mercedes	40	+27.525^{3}	14	
13	37	(New Zealand) Nick Cassidy	Envision-Audi	40	+28.794	9	
14	3	(United Kingdom) Oliver Turvey	NIO	40	+32.978	22	
15	10	(United Kingdom) Sam Bird	Jaguar	40	+35.677	17	
16	30	(United Kingdom) Oliver Rowland	Mahindra	40	+36.047	16	
17	28	(United States) Oliver Askew	Andretti-BMW	40	+36.395	12	
18	33	(United Kingdom) Dan Ticktum	NIO	40	+44.607	21	
19	9	(New Zealand) Mitch Evans	Jaguar	40	+1:02.458	11	
20	7	(Brazil) Sérgio Sette Câmara	Dragon-Penske	40	+1:21.406	20	
Ret	99	(Italy) Antonio Giovinazzi	Dragon-Penske	21	Retired in pits	19	
Ret	29	(United Kingdom) Alexander Sims	Mahindra	1	Technical	13	

Notes:

- ^1 – Pole position.
- ^2 – Fastest lap.
- ^3 – Lucas di Grassi received a 5-second time penalty for causing a collision.

==== Standings after the race ====
Drivers' Championship standings

	Pos	Driver	Points
	1	(Switzerland) Edoardo Mortara	43
	2	(Netherlands) Nyck de Vries	38
9	3	(Germany) Pascal Wehrlein	30
3	4	(Germany) André Lotterer	30
2	5	(Belgium) Stoffel Vandoorne	28

Teams' Championship standings

	Pos	Constructor	Points
	1	(Monaco) Venturi-Mercedes	68
	2	(Germany) Mercedes	66
2	3	(Germany) Porsche	60
2	4	(France) Techeetah-DS	39
1	5	(United Kingdom) Envision-Audi	31

- Notes: Only the top five positions are included for both sets of standings.

== Notes ==
Previous race: 2022 Diriyah ePrix	FIA Formula E World Championship; 2021–22 season	Next race: 2022 Rome ePrix
Previous race: 2020 Mexico City ePrix	Mexico City ePrix	Next race: 2023 Mexico City ePrix
