= 2022 Monaco ePrix =

Race 6 of 16 of the 2021–22 Formula E season
← Previous race	Next race →

Race details
- Date: 30 April 2022
- Official name: 2022 Monaco E-Prix
- Location: Circuit de Monaco, Monte Carlo, Monaco
- Course: Street circuit
- Course length: 3.337 km (2.074 mi)
- Distance: 30 laps, 100.110 km (62.205 mi)

Pole position
Driver	(New Zealand) Mitch Evans	Jaguar
- Time: 1:29.839

Fastest lap
Driver	(Netherlands) Robin Frijns	Envision-Audi
- Time: 1:32.707 on lap 22

Podium
First	(Belgium) Stoffel Vandoorne	Mercedes
Second	(New Zealand) Mitch Evans	Jaguar
Third	(France) Jean-Éric Vergne	Techeetah-DS

The 2022 Monaco ePrix was a Formula E electric car race held at the Circuit de Monaco on 30 April 2022. It served as the sixth round of the 2021–22 Formula E season, and marked the fifth edition of the event. The track was slightly revised, with the reprofiled Nouvelle Chicane used in 2021 being scrapped, making this the first time the traditional Monaco Grand Prix layout was used in Formula E. Stoffel Vandoorne won the race to claim the lead of the championship, while pole-sitter Mitch Evans and previous championship leader Jean-Éric Vergne rounded out the podium.

== Classification ==
=== Qualifying ===
Group draw
Group A	(France) JEV (1)	(Belgium) VAN (3)	(Switzerland) MOR (5)	(Germany) WEH (7)	(Brazil) DIG (9)	(United Kingdom) BIR (11)	(New Zealand) CAS (13)	(Switzerland) BUE (15)	(Germany) GUE (17)	(United Kingdom) TIC (19)	(Brazil) SET (21)
Group B	(Netherlands) FRI (2)	(New Zealand) EVA (4)	(Germany) LOT (6)	(Netherlands) DEV (8)	(United Kingdom) DEN (10)	(Portugal) DAC (12)	(United Kingdom) TUR (14)	(United Kingdom) ROW (16)	(United States) ASK (18)	(United Kingdom) SIM (20)	(Italy) GIO (22)

==== Qualifying duels ====
Quarter-finals
B4	(Netherlands) Robin Frijns
A1	(Belgium) Stoffel Vandoorne
B3	(Germany) André Lotterer
A2	(Germany) Pascal Wehrlein
A3	(France) Jean-Éric Vergne
B2	(Netherlands) Nyck de Vries
A4	(Brazil) Lucas di Grassi
B1	(New Zealand) Mitch Evans

Semi-finals
(Belgium) Stoffel Vandoorne
(Germany) Pascal Wehrlein
(France) Jean-Éric Vergne
(New Zealand) Mitch Evans

Final
(Germany) Pascal Wehrlein
(New Zealand) Mitch Evans

==== Overall classification ====
Pos.	No.	Driver	Team	A	B	QF	SF	F	Grid
1	9	(New Zealand) Mitch Evans	Jaguar	—N/a	1:31.245	1:30.053	1:30.001	1:29.839	1
2	94	(Germany) Pascal Wehrlein	Porsche	1:31.411	—N/a	1:30.098	1:30.065	1:30.096	2
3	25	(France) Jean-Éric Vergne	Techeetah-DS	1:31.533	—N/a	1:30.421	1:30.118	—N/a	3
4	5	(Belgium) Stoffel Vandoorne	Mercedes	1:31.326	—N/a	1:30.293	1:30.243	—N/a	4
5	11	(Brazil) Lucas di Grassi	Venturi-Mercedes	1:31.681	—N/a	1:30.338	—N/a	—N/a	5
6	36	(Germany) André Lotterer	Porsche	—N/a	1:31.313	1:30.366	—N/a	—N/a	6
7	4	(Netherlands) Robin Frijns	Envision-Audi	—N/a	1:31.405	1:30.451	—N/a	—N/a	7
8	17	(Netherlands) Nyck de Vries	Mercedes	—N/a	1:31.271	1:30.938	—N/a	—N/a	8
9	30	(United Kingdom) Oliver Rowland	Mahindra	—N/a	1:31.499	—N/a	—N/a	—N/a	9
10	10	(United Kingdom) Sam Bird	Jaguar	1:31.694	—N/a	—N/a	—N/a	—N/a	13^{1}
11	13	(Portugal) António Félix da Costa	Techeetah-DS	—N/a	1:31.510	—N/a	—N/a	—N/a	10
12	22	(Germany) Maximilian Günther	e.dams-Nissan	1:31.899	—N/a	—N/a	—N/a	—N/a	11
13	28	(United States) Oliver Askew	Andretti-BMW	—N/a	1:31.614	—N/a	—N/a	—N/a	12
14	33	(United Kingdom) Dan Ticktum	NIO	1:31.931	—N/a	—N/a	—N/a	—N/a	14
15	27	(United Kingdom) Jake Dennis	Andretti-BMW	—N/a	1:31.830	—N/a	—N/a	—N/a	15
16	48	(Switzerland) Edoardo Mortara	Venturi-Mercedes	1:31.975	—N/a	—N/a	—N/a	—N/a	16
17	29	(United Kingdom) Alexander Sims	Mahindra	—N/a	1:31.933	—N/a	—N/a	—N/a	17
18	37	(New Zealand) Nick Cassidy	Envision-Audi	1:32.009	—N/a	—N/a	—N/a	—N/a	18
19	99	(Italy) Antonio Giovinazzi	Dragon-Penske	—N/a	1:32.091	—N/a	—N/a	—N/a	19
20	7	(Brazil) Sérgio Sette Câmara	Dragon-Penske	1:32.137	—N/a	—N/a	—N/a	—N/a	20
21	3	(United Kingdom) Oliver Turvey	NIO	—N/a	1:32.497	—N/a	—N/a	—N/a	21
22	23	(Switzerland) Sébastien Buemi	e.dams-Nissan	1:32.185	—N/a	—N/a	—N/a	—N/a	22

Notes:

- ^1 – Sam Bird received a 3-place grid penalty for causing a collision in the previous race in Rome.

=== Race ===
Pos.	No.	Driver	Team	Laps	Time/Retired	Grid	Points
1	5	(Belgium) Stoffel Vandoorne	Mercedes	30	51:12.473	4	25
2	9	(New Zealand) Mitch Evans	Jaguar	30	+1.285	1	18+3^{1}
3	25	(France) Jean-Éric Vergne	Techeetah-DS	30	+3.293	3	15
4	4	(Netherlands) Robin Frijns	Envision-Audi	30	+3.467	7	12+1^{2}
5	13	(Portugal) António Félix da Costa	Techeetah-DS	30	+3.952	10	10
6	11	(Brazil) Lucas di Grassi	Venturi-Mercedes	30	+8.133	5	8
7	37	(New Zealand) Nick Cassidy	Envision-Audi	30	+15.273	18	6
8	23	(Switzerland) Sébastien Buemi	e.dams-Nissan	30	+17.773	22	4
9	27	(United Kingdom) Jake Dennis	Andretti-BMW	30	+17.820	15	2
10	17	(Netherlands) Nyck de Vries	Mercedes	30	+18.283	8	1
11	29	(United Kingdom) Alexander Sims	Mahindra	30	+19.350	17	
12	33	(United Kingdom) Dan Ticktum	NIO	30	+19.756	14	
13	7	(Brazil) Sérgio Sette Câmara	Dragon-Penske	30	+22.894	20	
14	3	(United Kingdom) Oliver Turvey	NIO	30	+23.198	21	
15	28	(United States) Oliver Askew	Andretti-BMW	30	+23.432	12	
16	99	(Italy) Antonio Giovinazzi	Dragon-Penske	30	+27.987^{3}	19	
17	22	(Germany) Maximilian Günther	e.dams-Nissan	30	+39.668	11	
Ret	48	(Switzerland) Edoardo Mortara	Venturi-Mercedes	23	Collision damage	16	
Ret	36	(Germany) André Lotterer	Porsche	18	Collision	6	
Ret	30	(United Kingdom) Oliver Rowland	Mahindra	18	Collision	9	
Ret	94	(Germany) Pascal Wehrlein	Porsche	15	Electrics	2	
Ret	10	(United Kingdom) Sam Bird	Jaguar	7	Collision damage	13	

Notes:

- ^1 – Pole position.
- ^2 – Fastest lap.
- ^3 – Antonio Giovinazzi received a 5-second time penalty for leaving the track and gaining an advantage.

==== Standings after the race ====
Drivers' Championship standings

	Pos	Driver	Points
2	1	(Belgium) Stoffel Vandoorne	81
1	2	(France) Jean-Éric Vergne	75
1	3	(New Zealand) Mitch Evans	72
2	4	(Netherlands) Robin Frijns	71
	5	(Switzerland) Edoardo Mortara	49

Teams' Championship standings

	Pos	Constructor	Points
	1	(Germany) Mercedes	120
1	2	(France) Techeetah-DS	105
2	3	(United Kingdom) Jaguar	94
2	4	(United Kingdom) Envision-Audi	87
1	5	(Monaco) Venturi-Mercedes	86

Previous race: 2022 Rome ePrix	FIA Formula E World Championship; 2021–22 season	Next race: 2022 Berlin ePrix
Previous race: 2021 Monaco ePrix	Monaco ePrix	Next race: 2023 Monaco ePrix
