= 2019 Rome ePrix =

Race 7 of 12 of the 2018–19 Formula E season
← Previous race	Next race →

Race details
- Date: 13 April 2019
- Official name: 2019 GEOX Rome E-Prix
- Location: Circuto Cittadino dell'EUR, EUR, Rome
- Course: Street circuit
- Course length: 2.860 km (1.777 mi)
- Distance: 29 laps, 82.94 km (51.54 mi)
- Weather: Cloudy

Pole position
Driver	(Germany) André Lotterer	Techeetah−DS
- Time: 1:32.123

Fastest lap
Driver	(France) Jean-Éric Vergne	Techeetah−DS
- Time: 1:31.016 on lap 27

Podium
First	(New Zealand) Mitch Evans	Jaguar
Second	(Germany) André Lotterer	Techeetah−DS
Third	(Belgium) Stoffel Vandoorne	HWA-Venturi

The 2019 Rome ePrix (formally the 2019 GEOX Rome E-Prix) was a Formula E electric car race held at the Circuto Cittadino dell'EUR in the EUR residential and business district of the Italian capital of Rome on 13 April 2019. It was the seventh round of the 2018–19 Formula E season and the second running of the event. The 29-lap race was won by Jaguar driver Mitch Evans from a second position start. Andre Lotterer finished second for Techeetah and HWA Racelab driver Stoffel Vandoorne came third.

Andre Lotterer of DS Techeetah won the pole position by recording the fastest lap in qualifying and maintained his start line advantage heading into the first corner. He kept the lead until he was overtaken by Evans on the 18th lap. That allowed Evans into the lead. Despite being challenged by Lotterer, Evans takes his first victory of his career and for the Jaguar team.

== Report ==
=== Background ===
Coming into the race from Sanya three weeks earlier, BMW Andretti driver António Félix da Costa was in the lead of the Drivers' Championship with 62 points and was only 1 point ahead of Jérôme d'Ambrosio of Mahindra in second. DS Techeetah's Jean-Éric Vergne was a further seven points behind in third and Sam Bird of Virgin Racing placed fourth on tie with Vergne. Audi Sport Abt Schaeffler driver Lucas Di Grassi rounded out the top five with 52 points scored. In the Teams' Championship, Virgin Racing were leading with 97 points; tie on points with Mahindra behind in second position. Audi in third with a point behind, and DS Techeetah were 2 points behind in forth. BMW Andretti completing the top five with 80 points.

=== Qualifying ===
During qualifying, Andre Lotterer took his first pole position of the season with Mitch Evans placed at second place and Lopez finishing in third place

=== Race ===
At the start, Lopez caused a huge pileup at the back causing the race to be stopped. The race was restarted behind the safety car, but drivers struggled to maintain control of their cars. At the last lap, Mitch Evans won the race with Andre Lotterer finishing second

== Classification ==
=== Qualifying ===
Pos.	No.	Driver	Team	Time	Gap	Grid
1	36	(Germany) André Lotterer	Techeetah-DS	1:32.123	-	1
2	20	(New Zealand) Mitch Evans	Jaguar	1:32.483	+0.360	2
3	7	(Argentina) José María López	Dragon-Penske	1:32.906	+0.783	3
4	5	(Belgium) Stoffel Vandoorne	HWA-Venturi	1:33.233	+1.110	4
5	6	(Germany) Maximilian Günther	Dragon-Penske	1:35.640	+3.517	5
6	23	(Switzerland) Sébastien Buemi	e.Dams-Nissan	1:07.670	+4.208	6
7	48	(Switzerland) Edoardo Mortara	Venturi	1:30.397	−	7
8	4	(Netherlands) Robin Frijns	Virgin-Audi	1:30.422	+0.025	8
9	94	(Germany) Pascal Wehrlein	Mahindra	1:30.609	+0.212	14^{1}
10	19	(Brazil) Felipe Massa	Venturi	1:30.623	+0.226	9
11	22	(United Kingdom) Oliver Rowland	e.Dams-Nissan	1:30.723	+0.326	10
12	28	(Portugal) Antonio Felix da Costa	Andretti-BMW	1:30.804	+0.407	11
13	2	(United Kingdom) Sam Bird	Virgin-Audi	1:30.880	+0.483	12
14	11	(Brazil) Lucas Di Grassi	Audi	1:30.977	+0.580	13
15	17	(United Kingdom) Gary Paffett	HWA-Venturi	1:30.980	+0.583	15
16	25	(France) Jean Eric Vergne	Techeetah-DS	1:31.016	+0.619	16
17	66	(Germany) Daniel Abt	Audi	1:31.043	+0.646	17
18	16	(United Kingdom) Oliver Turvey	NIO	1:31.043	+0.646	18
19	64	(Belgium) Jérôme d'Ambrosio	Mahindra	1:31.192	+0.795	19
20	8	(France) Tom Dillmann	NIO	1:31.220	+0.823	20
21	3	(United Kingdom) Alex Lynn	Jaguar	1:39.657^{2}	+9.260	21
22	27	(United Kingdom) Alexander Sims	Andretti-BMW	no time	no time	22^{3}

Notes

- ^1 — Pascal Wehrlein received five-place grid penalty for overspeeding under red flag.
- ^2 — Alex Lynn's best lap times were deleted for exceeding 250 kW (340 hp) of power
- ^3 — Alexander Sims received 60-place grid penalty converted into a 10-second stop and go penalty during the race for changing E-motor, gearbox and inverter

=== Race ===
Pos.	No.	Driver	Team	Laps	Time/Retired	Grid	Points
1	20	(New Zealand) Mitch Evans	Jaguar	29	1:33:51.140	2	25
2	36	(Germany) André Lotterer	Techeetah-DS	29	+0.979	1	18+3^{6}
3	5	(Belgium) Stoffel Vandoorne	HWA-Venturi	29	+6.399	4	15
4	4	(Netherlands) Robin Frijns	Virgin-Audi	29	+9.181	8	12
5	23	(Switzerland) Sébastien Buemi	e.Dams-Nissan	29	+9.778	6	10+1^{7}
6	22	(United Kingdom) Oliver Rowland	e.Dams-Nissan	29	+11.262	10	8
7	11	(Brazil) Lucas di Grassi	Audi	29	+24.340	13	6
8	64	(Belgium) Jérôme d'Ambrosio	Mahindra	29	+28.633	19	4
9	28	(Portugal) António Félix da Costa	Andretti-BMW	29	+30.651^{3}	11	2
10	94	(Germany) Pascal Wehrlein	Mahindra	29	+30.735	14	1
11	2	(United Kingdom) Sam Bird	Virgin-Audi	29	+32.272	12	0
12	3	(United Kingdom) Alex Lynn	Jaguar	29	+42.238	21	0
13	16	(United Kingdom) Oliver Turvey	NIO	29	+48.616	18	0
14	25	(France) Jean Eric Vergne	Techeetah-DS	29	+49.732^{4}	16	0
15	8	(France) Tom Dillmann	NIO	29	+52.253	20	0
16	7	(Argentina) José María López	Dragon-Penske	29	+1:10.373	3	0
17	27	(United Kingdom) Alexander Sims	Andretti-BMW	29	+1:11.373	22	0
18	66	(Germany) Daniel Abt	Audi	28	Technical	17	0
19	6	(Germany) Maximilian Günther	Dragon-Penske	28	Energy^{5}	5	0
Ret	19	(Brazil) Felipe Massa	Venturi	11	Driveshaft	9	0
Ret	48	(Switzerland) Edoardo Mortara	Venturi	8	Driveshaft	7	0
Ret	17	(United Kingdom) Gary Paffett	HWA-Venturi	1	Collision	15	0

Notes

- ^3 — António Félix da Costa received 5-second time penalty for an undercharged battery.
- ^4 — Jean Eric Vergne received a drive through penalty converted into a 37-second time penalty for overtaking under Full Course Yellow.
- ^5 — Maximilian Günther received a 5-second time penalty for overspeeding under Full Course Yellow and a drive through penalty converted into a 37-second time penalty for attack mode infringement.
- ^6 — Pole position.
- ^7 — Fastest lap.

== Standings after the race ==
Drivers' Championship standings

+/–	Pos	Driver	Points
1	1	(Belgium) Jérôme d'Ambrosio	65
1	2	(Portugal) António Félix da Costa	64
6	3	(Germany) André Lotterer	62
7	4	(New Zealand) Mitch Evans	61
	5	(Brazil) Lucas di Grassi	58

Teams' Championship standings

+/–	Pos	Constructor	Points
3	1	(China) DS Techeetah	116
1	2	(United Kingdom) Virgin-Audi	109
1	3	(India) Mahindra	102
1	4	(Germany) Audi Sport ABT Schaeffler	102
	5	(United States) BMW i Andretti Motorsport	82

Previous race: 2019 Sanya ePrix	FIA Formula E Championship; 2018–19 season	Next race: 2019 Paris ePrix
Previous race: 2018 Rome ePrix	Rome ePrix	Next race: 2021 Rome ePrix
