= Rome ePrix =

Formula E race in Rome, Italy

- Circuito Cittadino dell'EUR (2021–2023)
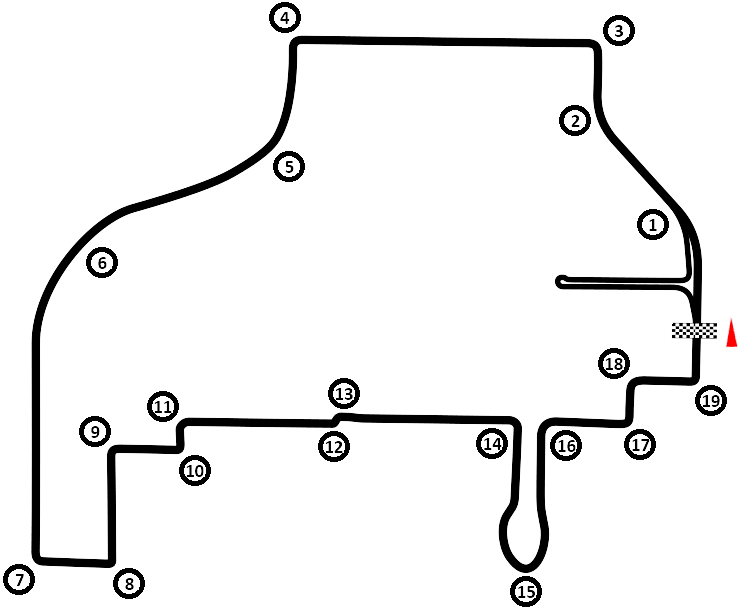

Race information
- Number of times held: 5
- First held: 2018
- Last held: 2023
- Most wins (drivers): (New Zealand) Mitch Evans (4)
- Most wins (constructors): Jaguar (4)
- Circuit length: 3.380 km (2.100 miles)

Last race (2023 Race 2)

Pole position
- (United Kingdom) Jake Dennis; Andretti-Porsche; 1:37.986

Podium
- 1. (United Kingdom) Jake Dennis; Andretti-Porsche; 45:04.323; 2. (France) Norman Nato; Nissan; +3.105; 3. (United Kingdom) Sam Bird; Jaguar; +3.633

Fastest lap
- (France) Jean-Éric Vergne; DS; 1:40.264

Original layout of the Circuito Cittadino dell'EUR, which was used for the Rome ePrix in the 2017–18 and 2018–19 seasons.

The Rome ePrix was an annual race of the single-seater, electrically powered Formula E championship held at the Circuito Cittadino dell'EUR in Rome, Italy. The race became official when local government unanimously approved of the race. It featured the second longest lap of the season, behind the Marrakesh ePrix, until 2019. A longer circuit was presented for the 2021 double-header, making it the longest circuit of the calendar, just above the Valencia ePrix and Monaco ePrix, the latter was extended similarly to its usual Grand Prix layout. The race was dropped since the 2023–24 season and was replaced by the Misano ePrix in 2024.

== Results ==
Edition		Track	Winner	Second	Third	Pole position	Fastest lap	Ref
2018		Circuito Cittadino dell'EUR	(United Kingdom) Sam Bird; DS Virgin Racing	(Brazil) Lucas di Grassi; Audi Sport ABT Schaeffler	(Germany) André Lotterer; Techeetah	(Sweden) Felix Rosenqvist; Mahindra Racing	(Germany) Daniel Abt; Audi Sport ABT Schaeffler	
2019		Circuito Cittadino dell'EUR	(New Zealand) Mitch Evans; Jaguar	(Germany) André Lotterer; Techeetah	(Belgium) Stoffel Vandoorne; HWA	(Germany) André Lotterer; Techeetah	(France) Jean-Éric Vergne; Techeetah	
2021	Race 1	Circuito Cittadino dell'EUR	(France) Jean-Éric Vergne; Techeetah	(United Kingdom) Sam Bird; Jaguar	(New Zealand) Mitch Evans; Jaguar	(Belgium) Stoffel Vandoorne; Mercedes	(New Zealand) Mitch Evans; Jaguar	
2021	Race 2	Circuito Cittadino dell'EUR	(Belgium) Stoffel Vandoorne; Mercedes	(United Kingdom) Alexander Sims; Mahindra Racing	(Germany) Pascal Wehrlein; Porsche	(New Zealand) Nick Cassidy; Envision Virgin Racing	(Netherlands) Nyck de Vries; Mercedes	
2022	Race 1	Circuito Cittadino dell'EUR	(New Zealand) Mitch Evans; Jaguar	(Netherlands) Robin Frijns; Envision Racing	(Belgium) Stoffel Vandoorne; Mercedes	(Belgium) Stoffel Vandoorne; Mercedes	(Brazil) Lucas di Grassi; Venturi	
2022	Race 2	Circuito Cittadino dell'EUR	(New Zealand) Mitch Evans; Jaguar	(France) Jean-Éric Vergne; Techeetah	(Netherlands) Robin Frijns; Envision Racing	(France) Jean-Éric Vergne; Techeetah	(Netherlands) Robin Frijns; Envision Racing	
2023	Race 1	Circuito Cittadino dell'EUR	(New Zealand) Mitch Evans; Jaguar	(New Zealand) Nick Cassidy; Envision Racing	(Germany) Maximilian Günther; Maserati	(New Zealand) Mitch Evans; Jaguar	(New Zealand) Mitch Evans; Jaguar	
2023	Race 2	Circuito Cittadino dell'EUR	(United Kingdom) Jake Dennis; Andretti-Porsche	(France) Norman Nato; Nissan	(United Kingdom) Sam Bird; Jaguar	(United Kingdom) Jake Dennis; Andretti-Porsche	(France) Jean-Éric Vergne; DS	

=== Repeat winners (drivers) ===
Wins	Driver	Years won
4	(New Zealand) Mitch Evans	2019, 2022 (Race 1), 2022 (Race 2), 2023 (Race 1)
