= Circuito Cittadino dell'EUR =

Circuit

Circuito cittadino dell'EUR
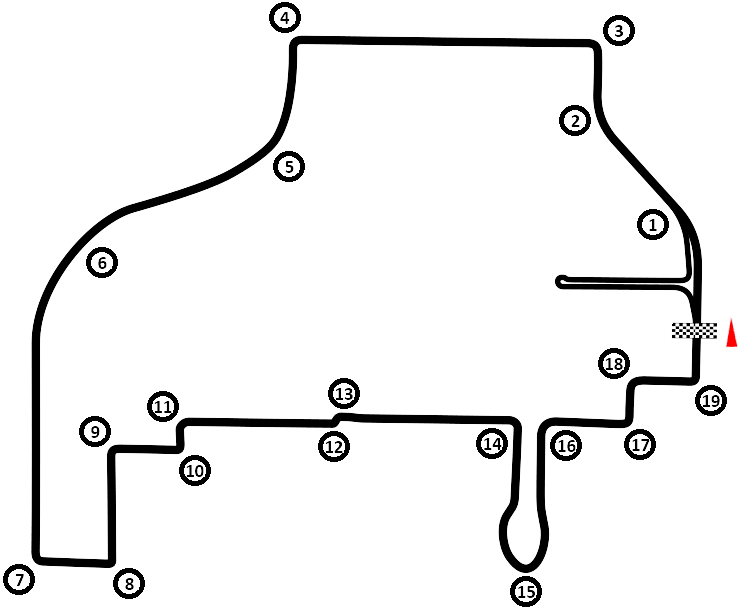
- The modified layout of Rome EUR street circuit (2021–2023)

- The original layout of Rome EUR street circuit (2018–2019)
- Location: EUR, Rome, Italy
- Coordinates: 41°50′04″N 12°28′23″E
- Opened: 18 April 2018; 8 years ago
- Closed: 16 July 2023; 3 years ago
- Major events: Formula E Rome ePrix (2018–2019, 2021–2023); Jaguar I-Pace eTrophy (2019)

Modified Formula E Circuit (2021–2023)
- Length: 3.385 km (2.103 mi)
- Turns: 19
- Race lap record: 1:40.264 ( (France) Jean-Éric Vergne, DS E-Tense FE23, 2023, F-E)

Original Formula E Circuit (2018–2019)
- Length: 2.849 km (1.770 mi)
- Turns: 21
- Race lap record: 1:31.016 ( (France) Jean-Éric Vergne, DS E-Tense FE 19, 2019, F-E)

The Circuito cittadino dell'EUR was a street circuit located in the EUR neighborhood in Rome, Italy. It was used for the Rome ePrix of the single-seater, electrically powered Formula E championship. It was first used on 14 April 2018 for the 2018 Rome ePrix.

== Layout ==
The track was firstly 2.849 km (1.770 mi) in length and features 21 turns. It started at Via Cristoforo Colombo and finished at the Marconi Obelisk, passing by the Rome Convention Center and the Palazzo dei Congressi. A circuit around the EUR district was previously proposed to host a Formula One Grand Prix in both 1985 and 2009.

On 3 February 2021, a new and longer layout was announced for the circuit, which is 3.385 km (2.103 mi) in length and features 19 turns. Also, both the start straight and finish straight were changed. This layout provided longer and faster straights in order to improve opportunities for overtaking.

== Lap records ==
The fastest official race lap records at the Circuito Cittadino dell'EUR are listed as:

Category	Time	Driver	Vehicle	Event
Modified Formula E Circuit (2021–2023): 3.385 km (2.103 mi)
Formula E	1:40.264	Jean-Éric Vergne	DS E-Tense FE23	2023 Rome ePrix
Original Formula E Circuit (2018–2019): 2.849 km (1.770 mi)
Formula E	1:31.016	Jean-Éric Vergne	DS E-Tense FE 19	2019 Rome ePrix
Jaguar I-Pace eTrophy	1:54.883	Cacá Bueno	Jaguar I-Pace eTrophy car	2019 Rome Jaguar I-Pace eTrophy round
