= BMW i3 =

Automotive nameplate by BMW

BMW i3 may refer to:

- BMW i3 (NA0), an electric car produced since 2026, based on the Neue Klasse platform
- BMW i3 (G28 BEV), an electric car produced between 2022 and 2026 for the Chinese market, based on the BMW 3 Series (G20)
- BMW i3 (hatchback), an electric car produced between 2013 and 2022 with battery electric and range extender electric powertrain options
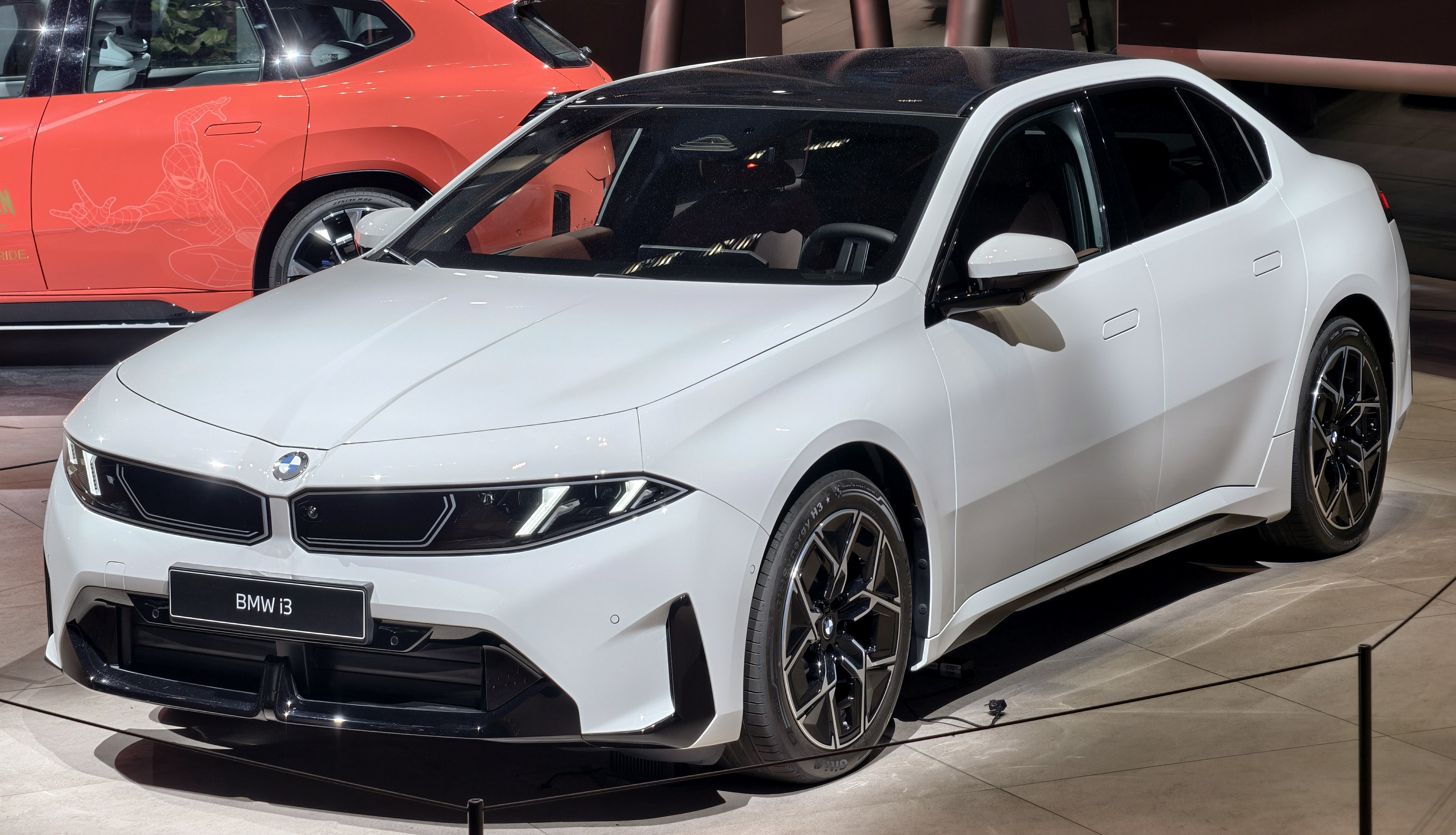
BMW i3 (NA0)

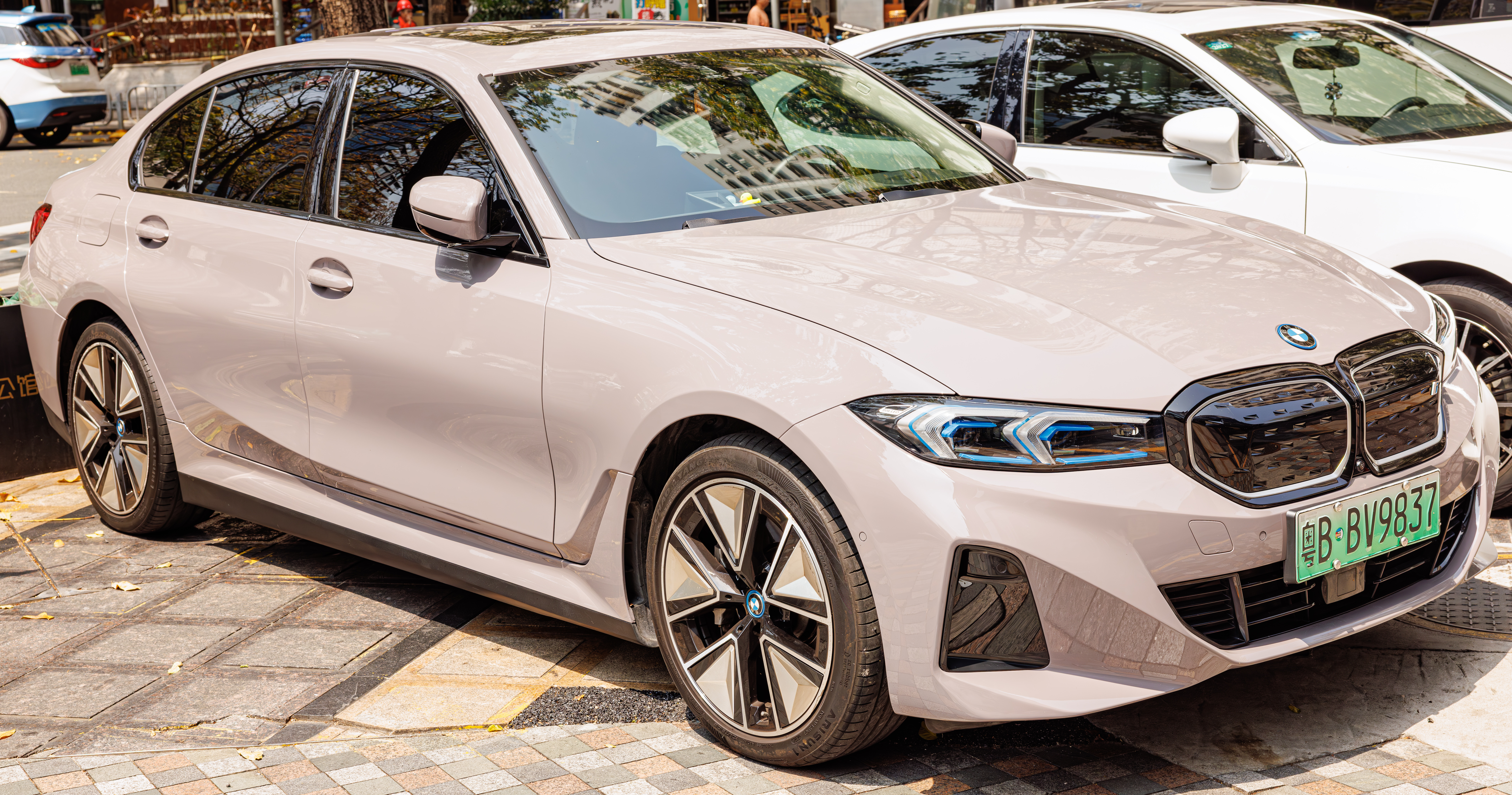
BMW i3 (G28 BEV)

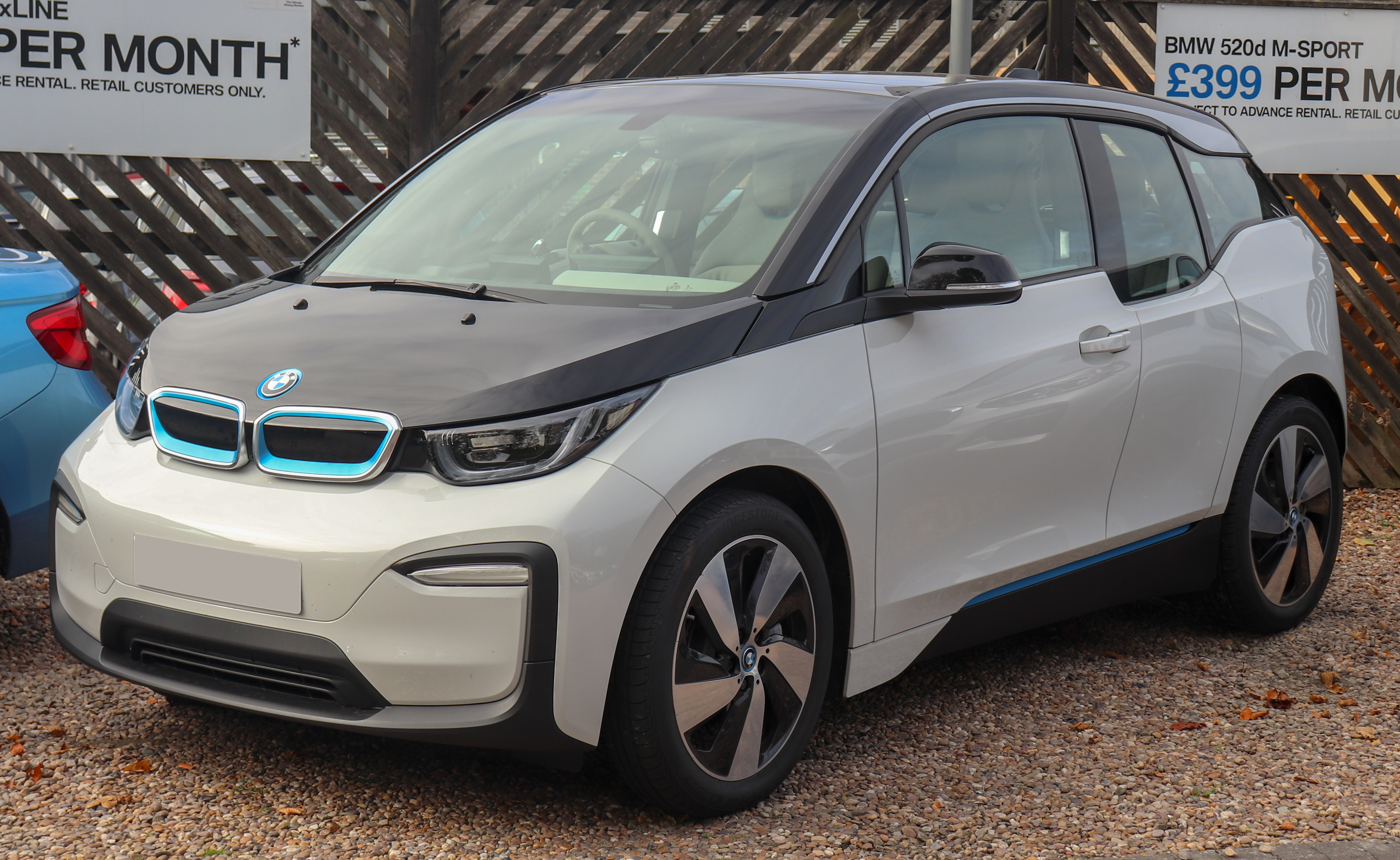
BMW i3 (hatchback)

== See also ==
- BMW i
- BMW 3 Series
