= BMW i =

Sub-brand of BMW

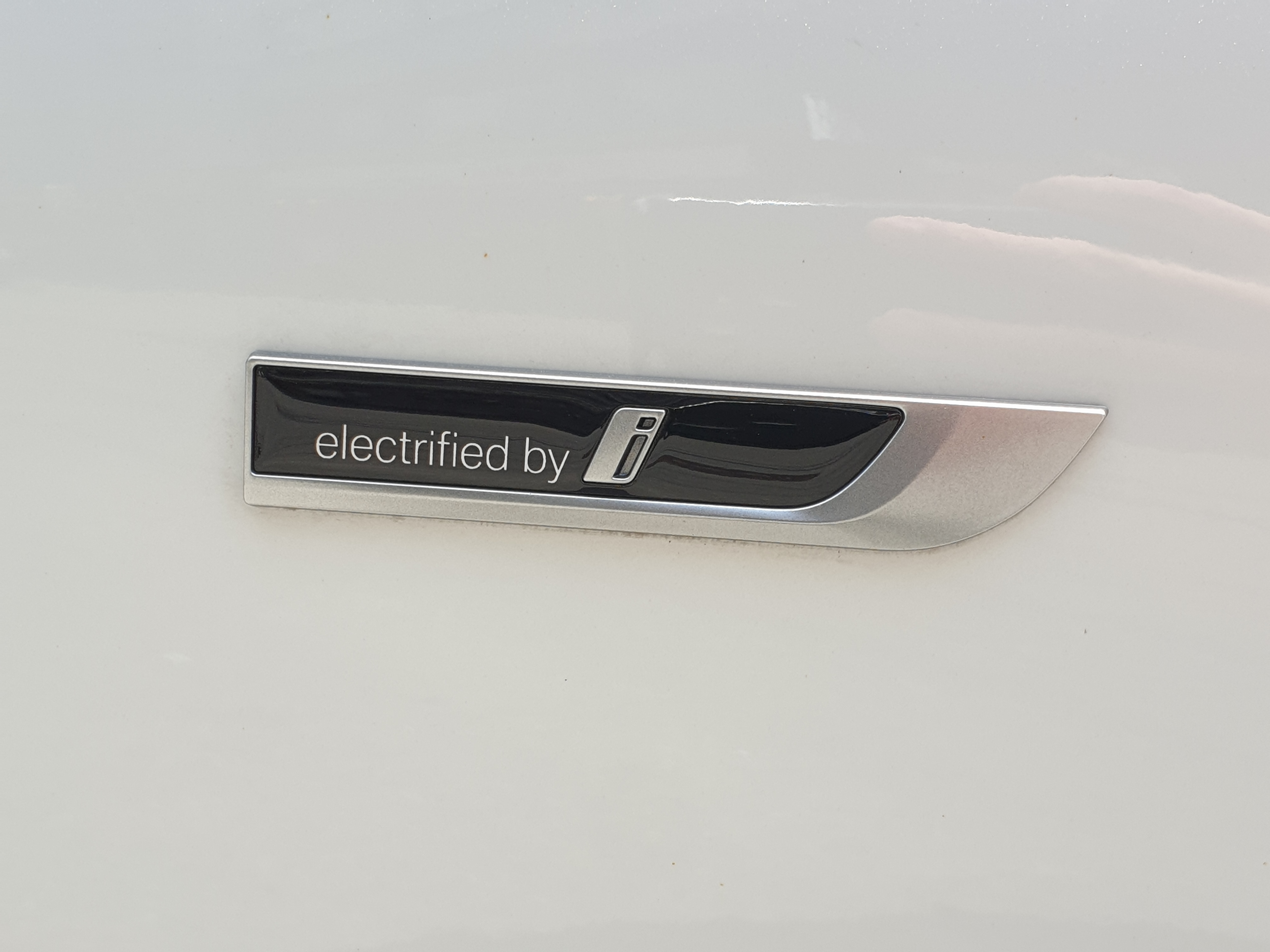
- Type: Division
- Industry: Automotive industry
- Founded: 2011
- Products: Plug-in electric vehicles
- Parent: BMW
- Website: www.bmw-i.de

BMW i is a sub-brand of BMW founded in 2011 to design and manufacture plug-in electric vehicles. The company initially released two vehicles: the i3 all-electric car and the i8 plug-in hybrid. From 2020, BMW began electrifying models in the mainstream BMW range with the iX3, while the iX was the only purpose-built electric vehicle.

Concept versions of both the i3 and i8 were shown at the 2009 Frankfurt Motor Show. It was also featured during a BMW World event, where the company's top automobiles were showcased. The company announced their commitment to build it by 2013. Series production of the BMW i3 for retail customers began in September of that year, and the European market launch took place in November 2013, with the first retail deliveries in Germany. The BMW i8 was launched in Germany in June 2014. The United States, Norway, Germany, and the UK are the main markets for both models. During the launch, Tesla has been on sale for just over a year in the US market.

In February 2016, BMW announced the introduction of the "iPerformance" model designation, which is being given to all BMW plug-in hybrid vehicles from July 2016. The aim is to provide a visible indicator of the transfer of technology from BMW i to the BMW core brand. As of June 2021, seven BMW electrified models have been released using BMW i technology, the X1 xDrive25e, X3 xDrive30e, X5 xDrive45e, 225xe Active Tourer, 320e/330e iPerformance, 520e/530e/545e iPerformance, and 745e/745Le iPerformance. The Mini Cooper S E Countryman ALL4 plug-in hybrid also shares the i technology.

Combined global sales of BMW Group electrified vehicles achieved the 500,000th unit milestone in December 2019, including BMW i, iPerformance, xDrive, and MINI brand electrified cars. Global sales of all variants of the BMW i3 reached over 165,000 units delivered at the beginning of 2020. Production of the BMW i8 ended in June 2020, with worldwide sales of more than 20,000 units.

== History ==
=== Project i: BMW i3 and BMW i8 ===
BMW's "Project i" is a program created to develop lightweight eco-friendly urban electric car concepts designed to address the mobility and sustainability needs for people who live in megacities. According to BMW, "Project i" has three phases. The Mini E demonstration was the first phase of this project, and it was followed by a similar field testing that began in January 2012 with the BMW ActiveE all-electric vehicle. The ActiveE was based on the BMW 1 Series Coupe and built considering the lessons learned from the Mini E trial. The last phase of "Project i" was the development of the i3 and i8 electric cars.

The automaker expected that its first series production all-electric drive vehicle would help it achieve an overall fleet fuel economy average of 6.63 L/100 km (35.5 mpg) by 2016, as mandated by U.S. federal regulations. BMW expected high volume sales of the i3 to allow the company to continue selling several of its high-performance cars with low fuel economy in the U.S.

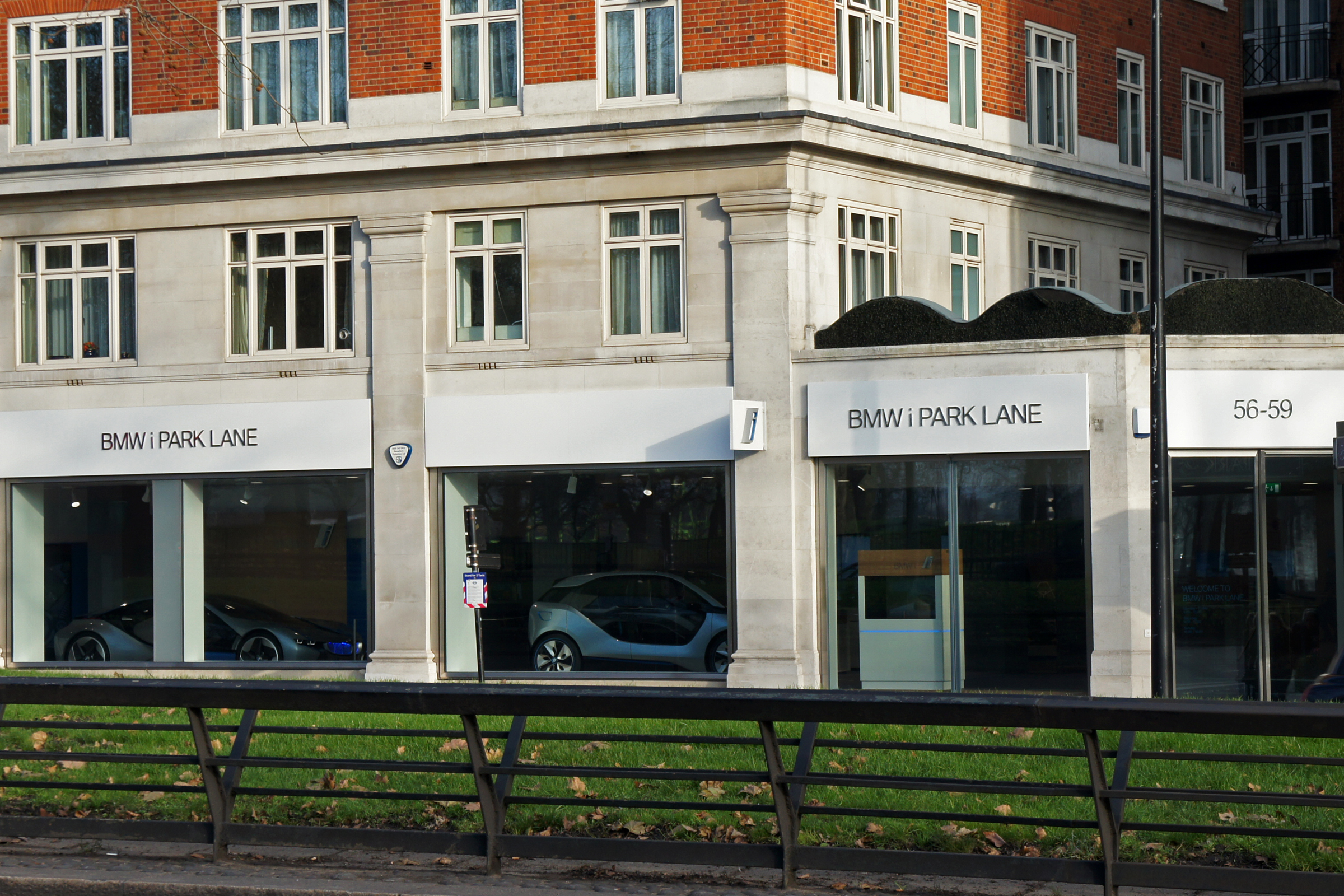
BMW i Park Lane showroom in London

In February 2011, BMW announced a new sub-brand, BMW i, to market the vehicles produced under Project i. BMW i vehicles are to be sold separately from BMW or Mini. The first two production models are the BEV (battery electric) Mega City Vehicle, now called BMW i3, and a plug-in hybrid called BMW i8, which is the production version of the Vision Efficient Dynamics concept unveiled at the 2009 Frankfurt Motor Show and has an all-electric range of 50 kilometres (31 mi). Production of both plug-in electric cars was scheduled to start in Leipzig in 2013.

Global i3 sales passed the 25,000 unit milestone in May 2015. Combined global sales of the BMW i brand models passed the 30,000 mark in June 2015, and the 50,000 unit milestone in January 2016. Global sales of the BMW i3 achieved the 50,000 unit milestone in July 2016.

As of December 2016, BMW expects a stable development in the plug-in electric market with low profits the next 5-7 years, until batteries have doubled their capacity, with the goal to expand the share of its electrified models to between 15% and 25% of sales by 2025.

By 2017, there were reports of Project i team members leaving BMW. Its CFO, Stefan Krause left to assume the global finance officer position at Faraday Future and he was joined there by Ulrich Kranz, the Project i's former manager. Krauze was also able to recruit an i-model designer, Karl Thomas Neuman while Carsten Breitfeld, the i8 development manager, left to join Byton as CEO.

=== Project i 2.0: BMW iX and flexible architectures ===
In 2017, BMW cancelled development of the third distinct model for the BMW i range with the company focusing on electrifying models in the mainstream BMW range and the iNext. Referred as "Project i 2.0", the iNext was developed to address key questions for the future of motoring, with a focus on electrification, connectivity and autonomy. The BMW iX was unveiled as fully production-ready in November 2020.

The electric models of the "Power of Choice" sustainability plan are based on the modular FAAR and CLAR architectures, where up to four different powertrain variants in each of its main model lines can be built on the same production line. These models use the fifth-generation eDrive system that incorporates the electric motor, transmission and power electronics into a single compact central housing. The BMW iX3 was the first model to be electrified and was unveiled in July 2020. The BMW i4 was revealed in March 2021 and is sold in several variants at different performance levels. The China-exclusive BMW i3, based on the long-wheelbase G28 3 Series, was revealed in March 2022. The BMW i7 and BMW iX1 were unveiled in April 2022 and June 2022, respectively. The BMW i5, in both sedan and wagon body style, were announced in March 2023 and unveiled in May 2023 and February 2024, respectively. The BMW iX2 was revealed in October 2023.

In 2019, BMW contracted Contemporary Amperex Technology and Samsung SDI to deliver lithium-ion cells for $10 billion over a decade, and BMW intends to supply them with cobalt and lithium to increase transparency.

BMW presented the BMW i Hydrogen Next SUV, a hydrogen fuel cell vehicle based on the G05 X5, at the 2019 Frankfurt Motor Show. BMW was testing the fuel cell technology with a road test fleet of F07 5 Series Gran Turismo in 2015. Production of the hydrogen fuel cells for the iX5 Hydrogen began in September 2022, and fewer than 100 vehicles were produced as part the pilot fleet. In September 2024, BMW and Toyota announced that they are cooperating for a BMW hydrogen fuel-cell vehicle coming in 2028.

=== Project i 3.0: electric-only Neue Klasse platform ===
There had been hints to a future electric-only platform; BMW announced the Neue Klasse platform designed for electric powertrains arriving in 2025. The new platform will switch to 46mm diameter cylindrical batteries (available in two heights of 95mm and 125mm) and use an 800V electrical architecture. The battery cells themselves will continue to use NMC chemistry and will be manufactured by existing partners CATL and EVE. BMW has stated that the technologies of the Neue Klasse will be incorporated into a total of 40 new models and model updates across its product range by 2027. The variants of the Neue Klasse platform include:

- NAx for smaller models with rear wheel and all wheel drive
- NBx for front wheel and all wheel drive
- NDx for premium class models with rear wheel and all wheel drive
- ZAx for performance models in the BMW M series

The first production model on the Neue Klasse platform, the BMW iX3 (NA5) SUV, was unveiled at IAA Mobility in Munich on 5 September 2025 and entered production from autumn 2025 at the newly constructed BMW Group Plant Debrecen in Hungary. European customer deliveries commenced in late January 2026, with US deliveries scheduled to begin in the summer of 2026. The second Neue Klasse model, the fully electric BMW i3 (NA0) sedan, had its design premiere on 18 March 2026; production at BMW Group Plant Munich is scheduled to begin in August 2026, with customer deliveries from autumn 2026. Models with NBx will be available in 2027 and 2028, including new types like BMW i1 and BMW i2.

The goal of the NMC battery line of the Neue Klasse over its predecessor is to get 30 % more range, 30 % faster charging, and cost reduction by 50 %. The BMW iX3, the first series-produced Neue Klasse model, had its world premiere in Munich on 5 September 2025. It represents the first application of BMW's sixth-generation eDrive technology in a production vehicle, featuring an 800V architecture and a peak charging rate of 400 kW. BMW describes the Neue Klasse as the company's "biggest future project," with Chairman Oliver Zipse stating that the entire BMW product range will benefit from the platform's innovations regardless of drive technology.

=== Stores ===
The first BMW i store opened in June 2012 at BMW's London Park Lane showroom. The carmaker premiered an updated version of the BMW i3 concept electric car and unveiled its i Pedelec electric bicycle concept. On 15 November 2013, retail deliveries for the i3 began with a special ceremony in Munich.

=== Using eDrive in core-brand BMW models ===
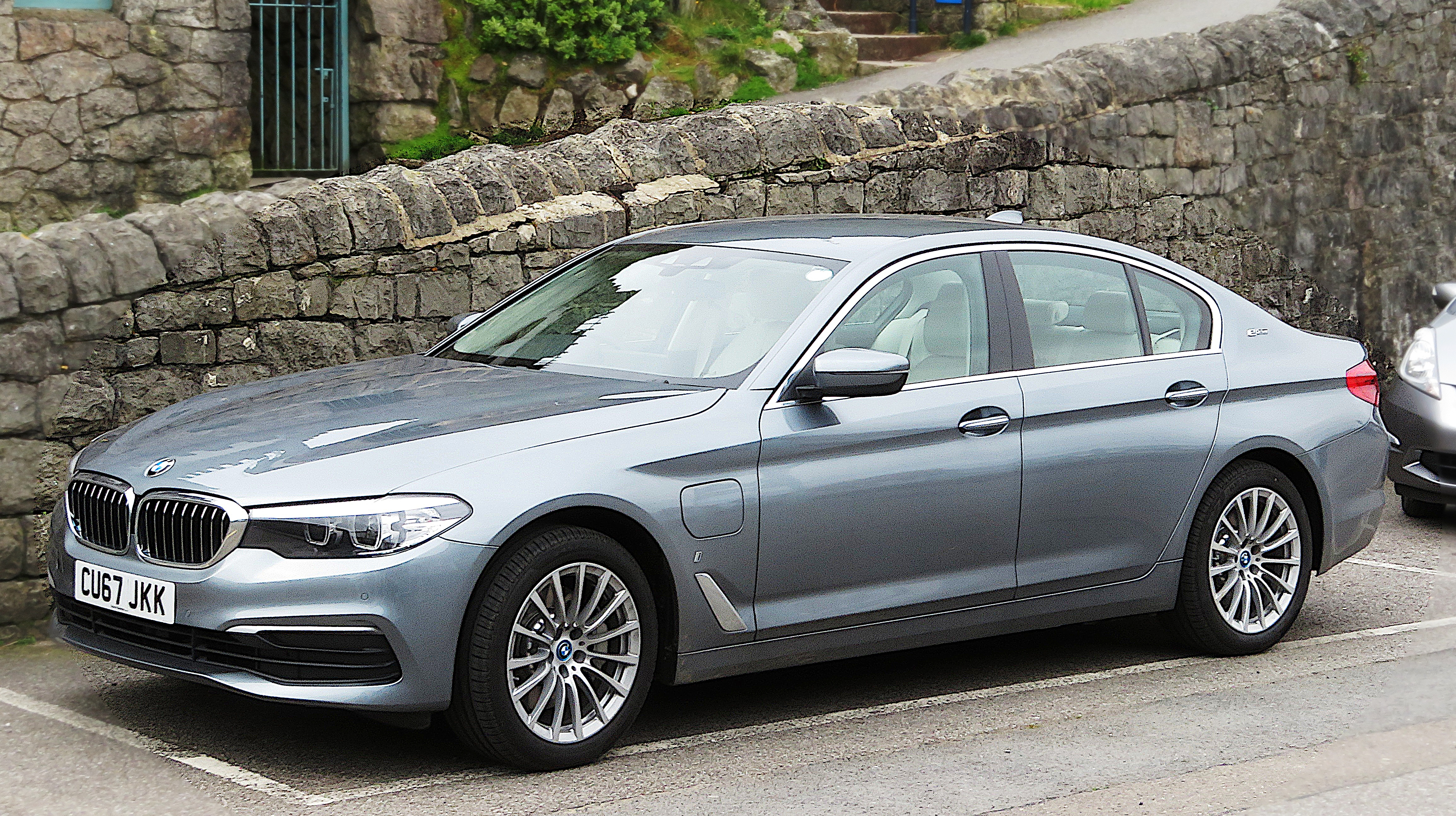
BMW 530e iPerformance

On 1 December 2014, BMW announced the group is planning to offer plug-in hybrid versions of all its core-brand models using eDrive technology developed for its BMW i brand plug-in vehicles. The goal of the company is to use plug-in technology to continue offering high performance vehicles while reducing CO_{2} emissions below 100g/km. In February 2016, BMW announced the introduction of the "iPerformance" model designation, which will be given to all BMW plug-in hybrid vehicles from July 2016. The aim is to provide a visible indicator of the transfer of technology from BMW i to the BMW core brand.

Sales of BMW i and iPerformance designated plug-in hybrid drive models have grown strongly in Europe, accounting for 4% of all BMW vehicles sold in Western Europe in June 2016. The percentage is significantly higher in markets with strong incentives and infrastructural measures, such as Netherlands, with 14.9% of all BMW vehicles sold in June were BMW i or BMW iPerformance models, and Scandinavia with 13.2%. Combined global sales of BMW i or BMW iPerformance models totalled 23,675 units during the first half of 2016. This is the result of the expanded range of electrified models, which includes seven electrified models including plug-in hybrids. Sales of this type of vehicle during the first half of 2016 were just under 87% higher than the same period in 2015. Combined global sales of BMW i and iPerformance plug-in hybrid models achieved the 100,000 unit milestone in early November 2016, three years after the inception of the BMW i3.

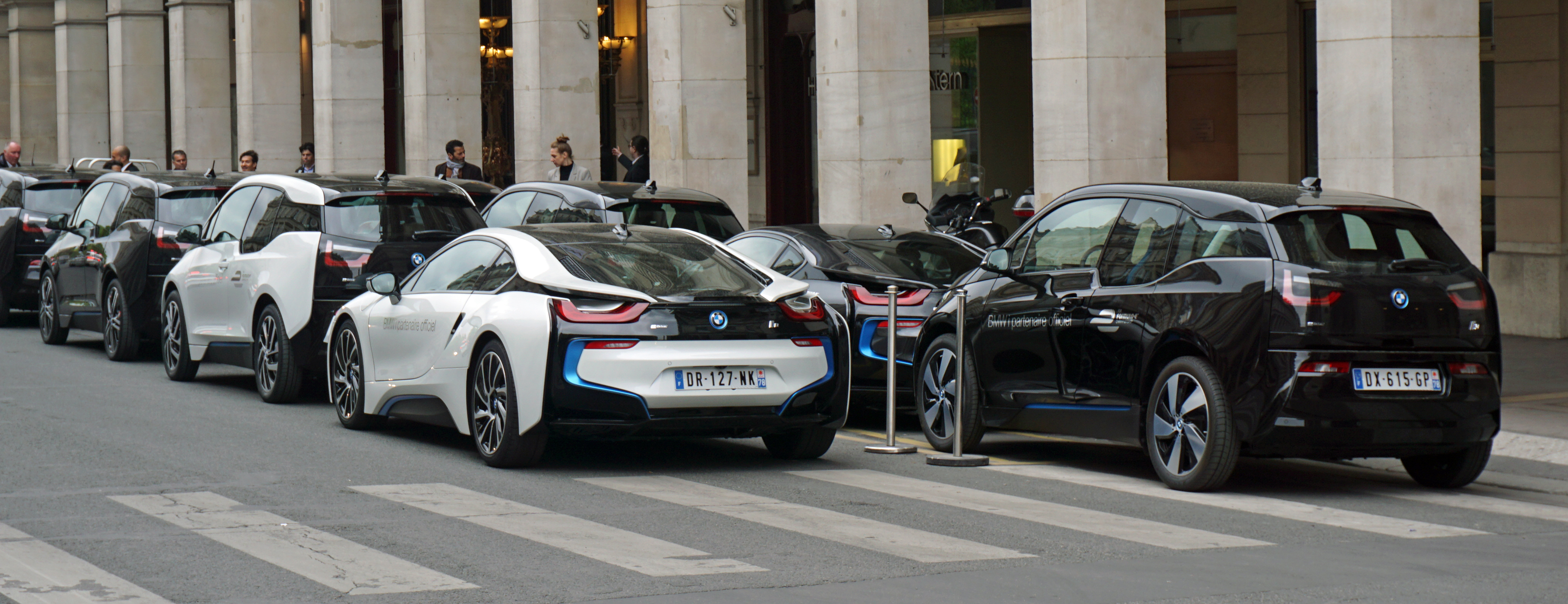
Official fleet of BMW i3s and BMW i8s on duty at the 2016 Paris ePrix, France

== Products ==
As of 2022, around 7 BMW i models are offered, the BMW i3 all-electric car with optional range-extender (REx), and the BMW i8 plug-in hybrid. As of March 2018, BMW i vehicles are sold in 74 countries. In November 2016, BMW announced the company expected to deliver 60,000 of its electrified i and iPerformance models in 2016, and set a sales target of 100,000 units for 2017. BMW set the goal to expand the share of its electrified models to between 15% and 25% of sales by 2025.

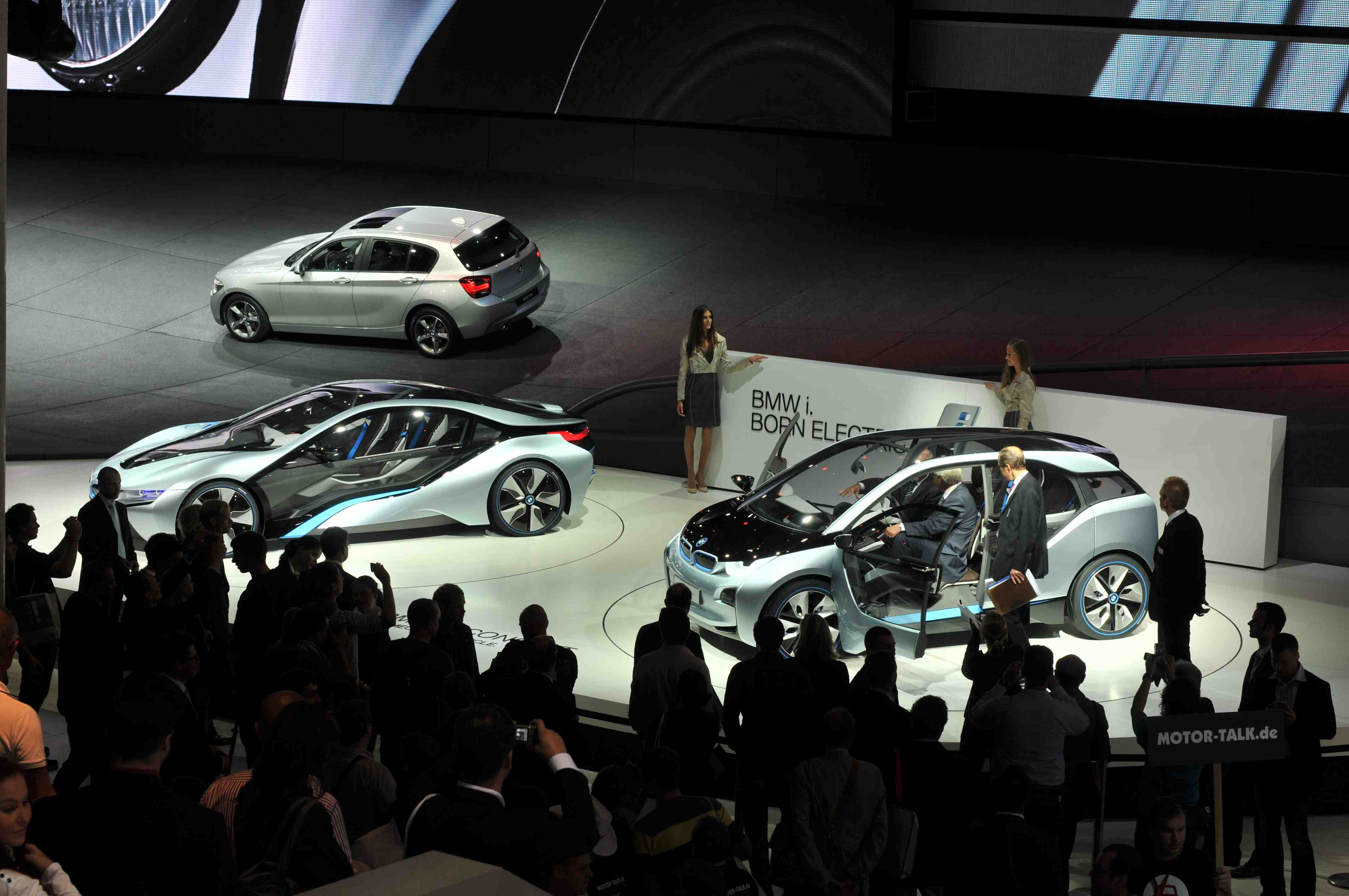
BMW i8 (left) and i3 (right) concept cars unveiled at the 2011 Frankfurt International Motor Show

The demand for BMW i and iPerformance vehicles increased significantly during the first half of 2016. In June 2016, 4% of all BMW sales in Western Europe were electrified cars, and again in July 2016, the electrified models captured 4% of all BMW sales in the region.

Global sales of all plug-in electrified models achieved the 100,000 unit milestone in early November 2016, consisting of more than 60,000 i3s, over 10,000 i8s, and about 30,000 from combined sales of all BMW iPerformance plug-in hybrid models. Combined global sales of BMW's electrified models totalled more than 62,000 units in 2016, and 103,080 in 2017, including MINI brand electrified vehicles.

Global sales of BMW Group's electrified vehicles passed the 250,000 unit milestone in April 2018, and the 300,000 mark in September 2018. A total of 142,617 electrified vehicles were delivered worldwide in 2018, and 145,815 in 2019. Since inception of the BMW i3, BMW Group cumulative global sales totalled 500,000 BMW and MINI electrified vehicles by mid December 2019.

=== BMW i3 ===
==== Design and technology ====
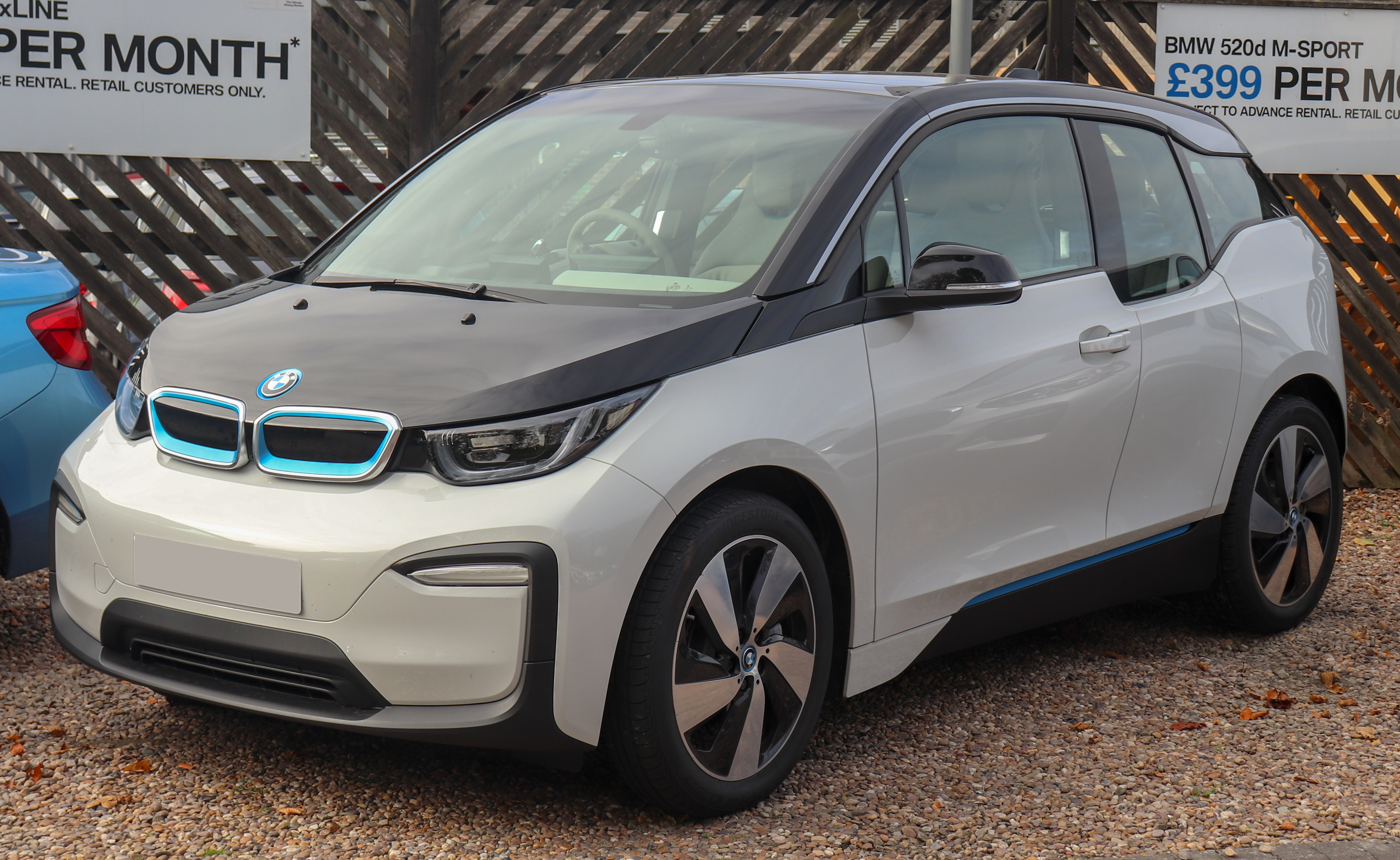
2017 BMW i3

The BMW i3 is an electric car, BMW's first zero emissions mass-produced vehicle. The i3 is the first volume production vehicle on the market featuring carbon-fiber reinforced plastic. This vehicle gets its power from an electric motor powered by lithium-ion batteries. The i3 is built for everyday use, with an all-electric range of 130 to 160 km (81 to 99 mi). BMW is offering a range extender ("REx") option powered by a 647 cc two-cylinder gasoline engine with a 9 L (2.0 imp gal; 2.4 US gal) fuel tank that engages when the battery level drops to a pre-specified point, acting purely as a generator to produce electricity to extend the range to about 240 to 300 km (150 to 190 mi).

According to BMW, at the beginning of the i3 release, the use of range-extender was much more than the carmaker expected, more than 60%. Over time it has decreased significantly, with some people almost never using it, and by early 2016 it is being regularly used in fewer than 5% of i3s.

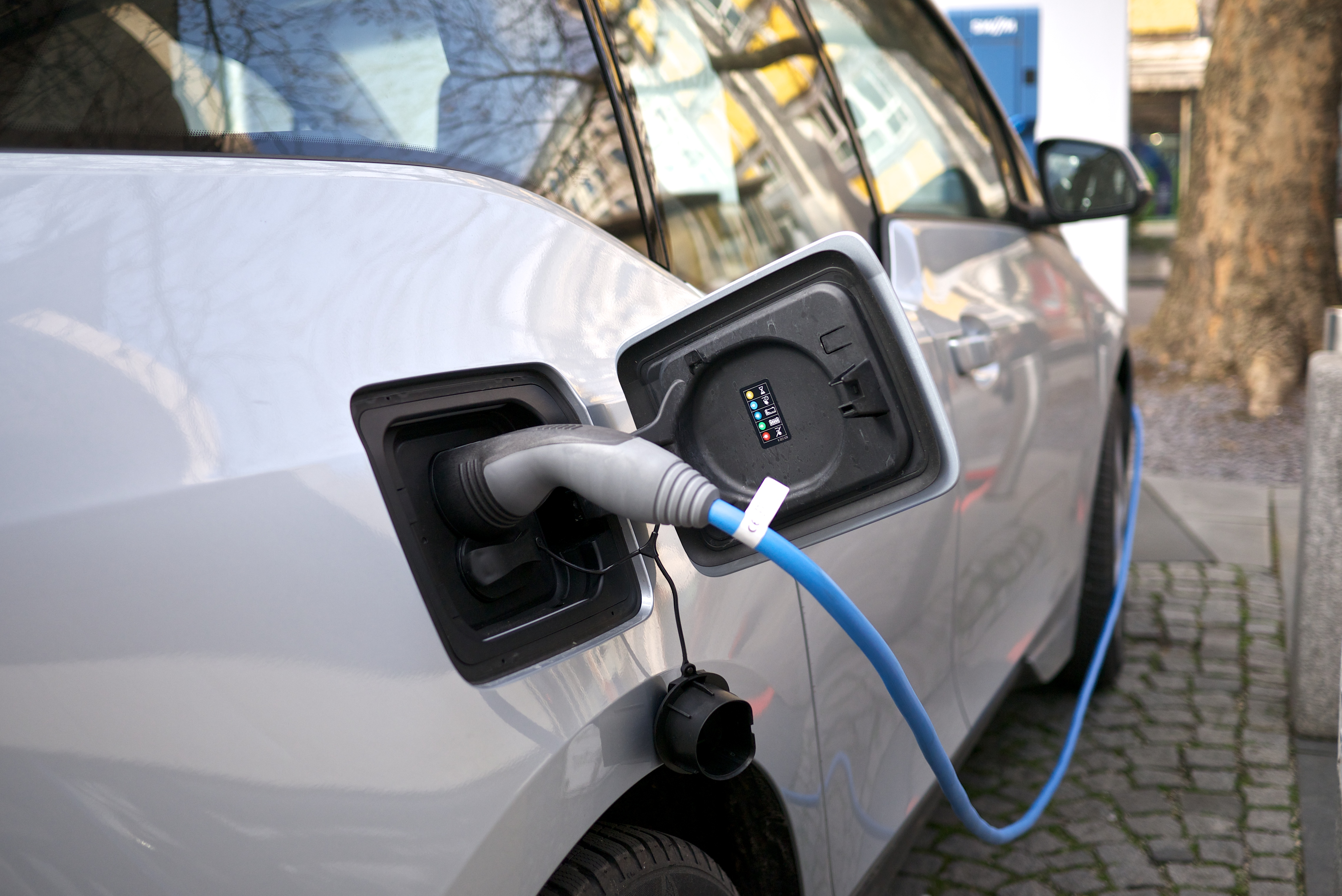
BMW i3 charging

In May 2016, BMW announced that the 2017 model year (MY) BMW i3 will come with an improved battery pack with 50% more capacity (33 kWh) than the previous model with a corresponding range increase expected to achieve 114 mi (183 km) under the EPA cycle, and 195 mi (314 km) under the New European Driving Cycle. The Range Extender (REx) variant features the same higher capacity battery as the all-electric model, with a corresponding all-electric range increase. Deliveries of the 2017 MY i3 in the U.S. market began in the third quarter of 2016. Both variants with the improved battery are available in the UK starting in July 2016.

==== Production ====
BMW invested US$100 million to build a plant in Moses Lake, Washington to manufacture the carbon-fiber reinforced plastic used on the vehicles' body panels. The plant is located in an area that has large access to hydroelectric power. The carbon fibre is then shipped to Germany, where it first gets fabricated and is then shipped to the automotive production plant in Leipzig. In October 2017 the BMW Group reported that the 100,000th BMW i3 had been built. BMW sold its stake in the Moses Lake plant in 2017, but continues to receive fibre from the plant. As of December 2019, BMW plans to continue i3 production until 2024, and there are no plans for an i3 successor. The 200,000th i3 was produced in the Leipzig plant on 15 October 2020.

==== Markets and sales ====
The first i3 deliveries to retail customers in Europe took place at the official market launch ceremony held in Munich on 15 November 2013. The i3 was also launched in the UK in November 2013. The release in the American market took place in May 2014. As of November 2015, the core phase of the market introduction of the i3 was finished, with only some smaller markets are still to follow.

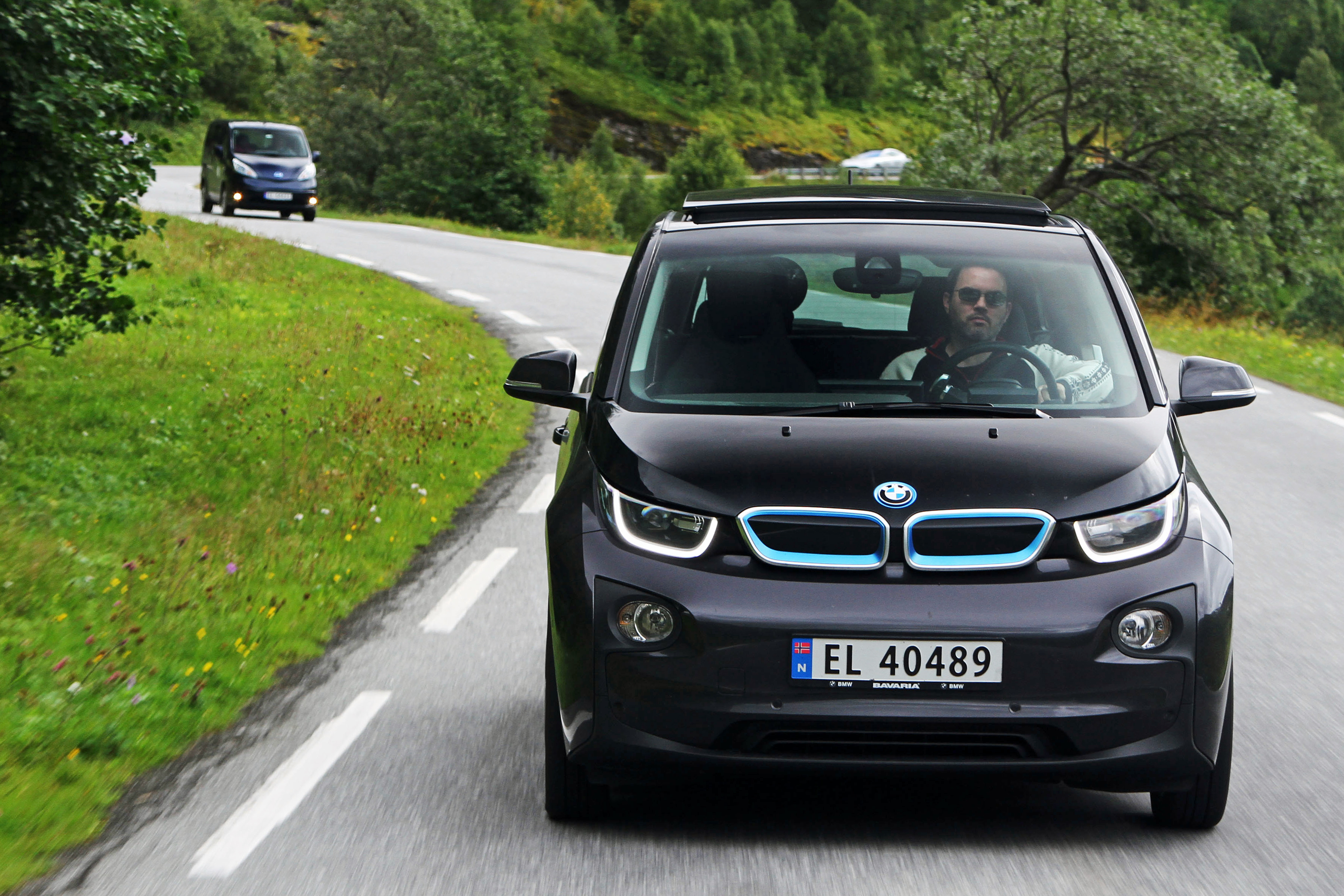
Norway has the largest BMW i3 market penetration per capita in the world.

The i3 ranked third among all-electric cars sold worldwide in 2014. By mid-2014, Norway had the world's largest i3 market penetration per capita due to its population size, BMW i3 sales grew from 16,052 units in 2014 to 24,057 in 2015, allowing the i3 to rank for the second year in a row as the world's third best selling all-electric car. Also in 2015 the i3 ranked fifth among the world's top selling plug-in electric cars. About 25,500 units were delivered worldwide in 2016, up 6% from 2015, allowing the BMW i3 to rank in 2016 for the third year running as the world's third best-selling all-electric car. In 2016 the i3 also ranked as the fifth top selling plug-in electric car. Global sales totalled 31,482 i3s in 2017, and 34,829 in 2018. All sales figures include the REx variant.

Since its introduction, global cumulative sales totalled about 65,500 units through December 2016, making the i3 the world's all-time third best-selling all-electric car after the Nissan Leaf and the Tesla Model S. These figure includes REx sales. The BMW i3 ranked as the top selling new passenger car model in Norway in November 2016, capturing a market share of 7.7% of total monthly new car sales. As of November 2016, the i3 continued as the top selling BMW electrified model, and accounted for 60% of combined BMW i and BMW iPerformance models.

BMW i3 sales since inception totalled more than 165,000 units delivered worldwide as of 2 January 2020. The United States is the largest market with 41,988 units delivered through December 2019. Norway is also a top market with 25,156 new units registered through mid-June 2020. Sales in the UK 10,000 units in March 2018.

=== BMW i8 ===
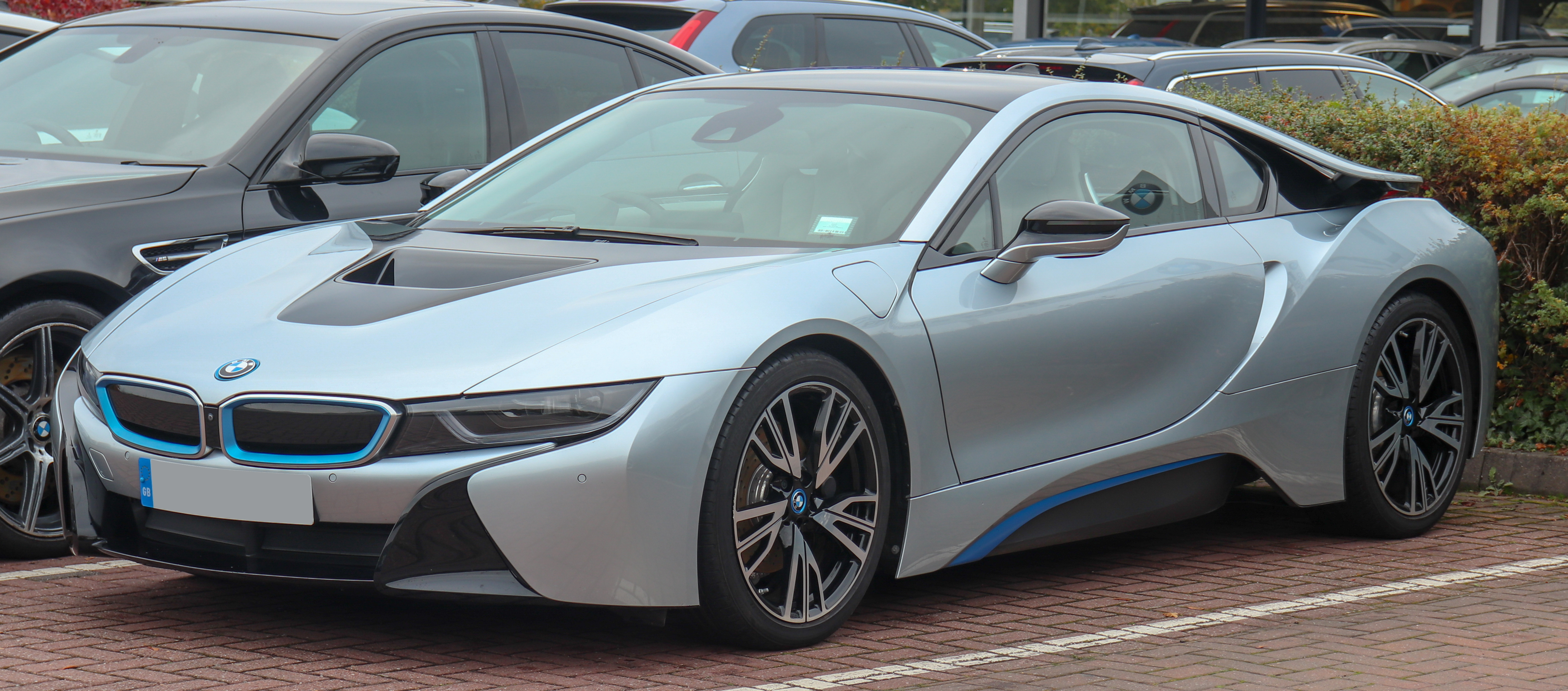
BMW i8 plug-in hybrid coupé

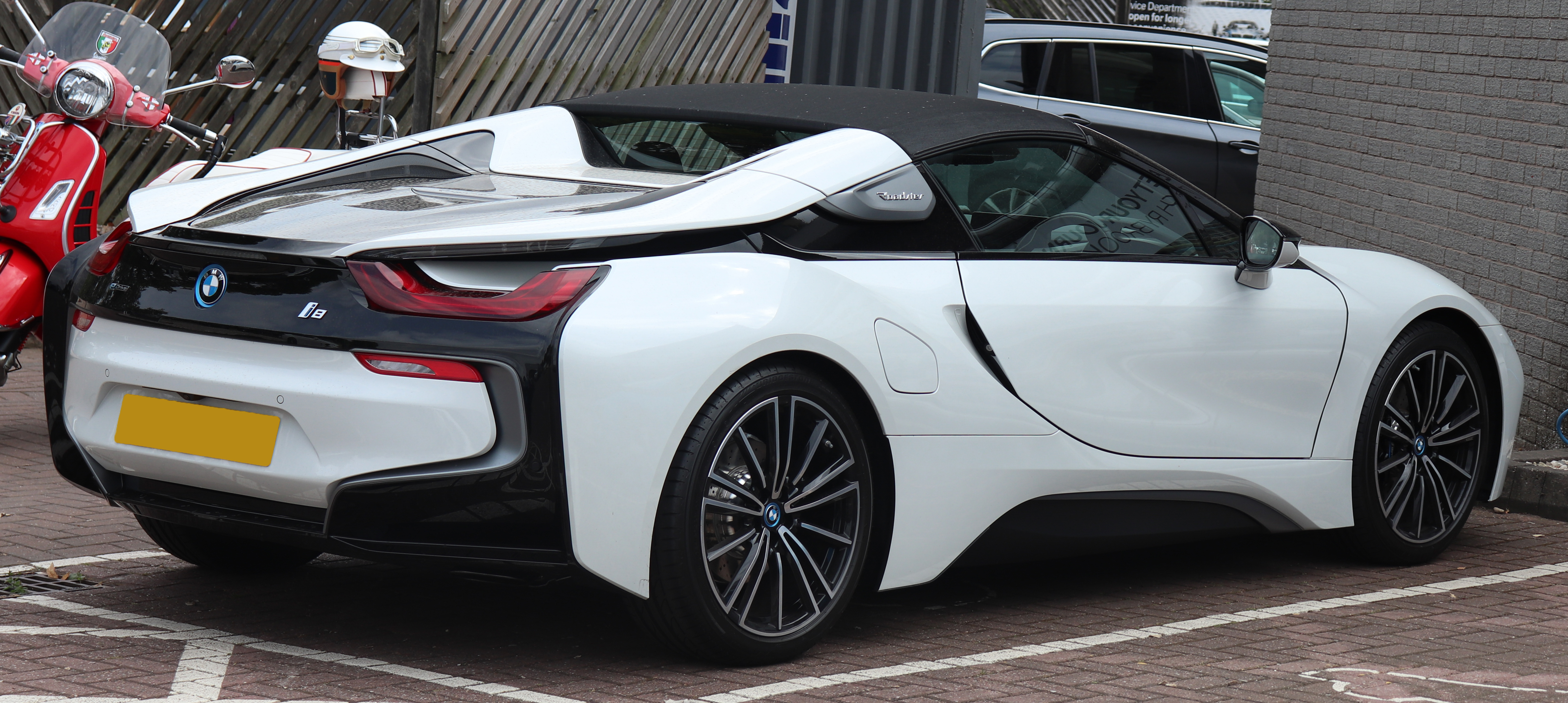
2018 BMW i8 Roadster

The BMW i8 plug-in hybrid was the production version of the BMW Vision Efficient Dynamics concept unveiled at the 2009 Frankfurt Motor Show. The i8 had an all-electric range of 35 km (22 mi). The front wheels were powered by an electric motor (131 hp). The rear wheels were powered by a 1.5-litre 3-cylinder gasoline engine (231 hp). 0-60mph sprint timings were estimated to be less than 4.5 seconds using both power sources. The positioning of the electric motor and engine over the axles, made the i8 benefit from a 50/50 weight distribution.

The production version of the i8 was unveiled at the 2013 Frankfurt Motor Show, together with the all electric BMW i3. Since 2014 through 2019, the BMW i8 has been the safety car in the FIA Formula E Championship.

The BMW i8 Roadster concept was unveiled at the 2012 Beijing Auto Show. The production version of the BMW i8 Roadster was premiered in late 2017, and delivery of the first 18 exclusive first edition units took place in May 2018.

The battery capacity of both models, coupé and roadster, was increased to a gross energy content of 11.6 kWh. This, and other improvements, made it possible to rise the all-electric range to 55 km (34 mi) for the BMW i8 Coupé, and 53 km (33 mi) for the BMW i8 Roadster, both under the NEDC.

The 20,000th i8 was produced in December 2019, one of the limited Ultimate Sophisto Edition models. The production cycle ended with the last remaining units of the 200 Ultimate Sophisto Edition vehicles in June 2020.

==== Markets and sales ====
BMW expected the U.S. to be the largest sales market. In Europe, the UK, Germany and France are expected to be the top markets. Retail deliveries began in Germany in June 2014. Deliveries to retail customers in the U.S. started in August 2014.

As of December 2015, global sales totalled 7,197 i8s, of which, 1,741 units were sold in 2014, and 5,456 in 2015. In 2015 global sales of the BMW i8 exceeded the combined figure of all other hybrid sports cars produced by other manufacturers. Global cumulative sales reached more than 10,000 BMW i8s by early November 2016. The U.S. was the top i8 market with 6,776 units sold through December 2019. By March 2020, worldwide sales since inception totalled more than 20,000 units, making the i8 the world's top selling plug-in electric sports cars, and exceeding sales of all competitors in its segment combined.

=== Life-Drive ===
Both the i3 and i8 will benefit from BMW's Life-Drive platform which makes use of light-weight materials. Both cars will come with an aluminium chassis, and in the case of the i8, the windshield, top, doors and fenders are made from polycarbonate glass, with the body having a drag coefficient of 0.26.

=== EPA ratings ===
The following are the BMW i3 (both 60 and 94 ampere hour per hour batteries) and i8 U.S. Environmental Protection Agency (EPA) ratings for all-electric range and fuel economy.

BMW i3 EPA ratings
Model	Year model	Fuel/EV range	Combined	City/Highway	Notes
i3 / i3s (120 A·h)	2019; 2020	153 mi (246 km)	113 mpg‑e 30 kWh/100 mi; 19 kWh/100 km	124 / 102 mpg‑e 27 / 33 kWh/100 mi; 17 / 21 kWh/100 km	
i3s (94 A·h)	2018	107 miles (172 km)	112 mpg‑e 30 kWh/100 mi; 19 kWh/100 km	126 / 99 mpg‑e 27 / 34 kWh/100 mi; 17 / 21 kWh/100 km	
i3 BEV (94 A·h)	2017; 2018	114 mi (183 km)	118 mpg‑e 29 kWh/100 mi; 18 kWh/100 km	129 / 106 mpg‑e 26 / 32 kWh/100 mi; 16 / 20 kWh/100 km	
i3 BEV (60 A·h)	2014; 2015; 2016; 2017	81 mi (130 km)	124 mpg‑e 27 kWh/100 mi; 17 kWh/100 km	137 / 111 mpg‑e 25 / 30 kWh/100 mi; 15 / 19 kWh/100 km	(Note: Between May 2014 and October 2016 the all-electric BMW i3 60 A·h was the most fuel efficient EPA-certified vehicle of all years regardless of fuel type.)
i3 / i3s REx (120 A·h)	2019; 2020	Electricity only: 126 mi (203 km)	100 mpg‑e 34 kWh/100 mi; 21 kWh/100 km	107 / 93 mpg‑e 32 / 36 kWh/100 mi; 20 / 23 kWh/100 km	(Note: The EPA classifies the i3 REx as a series plug-in hybrid or EREV while CARB as a range-extended battery-electric vehicle (BEVx). Since June 2014 the BMW i3 REx is the most fuel efficient EPA-certified vehicle current year vehicle with a gasoline engine in terms of its MPG-e combined gasoline/electricity rating.)
i3 / i3s REx (120 A·h)	2019; 2020	Gasoline only 72 mi (116 km)	31 mpg_{‑US} 7.6 L/100 km	30 / 31 mpg_{‑US} 7.8 / 7.6 L/100 km	(Note: The EPA classifies the i3 REx as a series plug-in hybrid or EREV while CARB as a range-extended battery-electric vehicle (BEVx). Since June 2014 the BMW i3 REx is the most fuel efficient EPA-certified vehicle current year vehicle with a gasoline engine in terms of its MPG-e combined gasoline/electricity rating.)
i3 REx (94 A·h)	2017; 2018	Electricity only 97 mi (156 km)	111 mpg‑e 30 kWh/100 mi; 19 kWh/100 km	—	(Note: The EPA classifies the i3 REx as a series plug-in hybrid or EREV while CARB as a range-extended battery-electric vehicle (BEVx). Since June 2014 the BMW i3 REx is the most fuel efficient EPA-certified vehicle current year vehicle with a gasoline engine in terms of its MPG-e combined gasoline/electricity rating.)
i3 REx (94 A·h)	2017; 2018	Gasoline only 83 mi (134 km)	35 mpg_{‑US} (6.7 L/100 km)	-	(Note: The EPA classifies the i3 REx as a series plug-in hybrid or EREV while CARB as a range-extended battery-electric vehicle (BEVx). Since June 2014 the BMW i3 REx is the most fuel efficient EPA-certified vehicle current year vehicle with a gasoline engine in terms of its MPG-e combined gasoline/electricity rating.)
i3 REx (60 A·h)	2014; 2015; 2016	Electricity only 72 mi (116 km)	117 mpg‑e 29 kWh/100 mi; 18 kWh/100 km	97 / 79 mpg‑e 35 / 43 kWh/100 mi; 22 / 27 kWh/100 km	(Note: The EPA classifies the i3 REx as a series plug-in hybrid or EREV while CARB as a range-extended battery-electric vehicle (BEVx). Since June 2014 the BMW i3 REx is the most fuel efficient EPA-certified vehicle current year vehicle with a gasoline engine in terms of its MPG-e combined gasoline/electricity rating.)
i3 REx (60 A·h)	2014; 2015; 2016	Gasoline only 78 mi (126 km)	39 mpg_{‑US} 6.0 L/100 km	41 / 37 mpg_{‑US} 5.7 / 6.4 L/100 km	(Note: The EPA classifies the i3 REx as a series plug-in hybrid or EREV while CARB as a range-extended battery-electric vehicle (BEVx). Since June 2014 the BMW i3 REx is the most fuel efficient EPA-certified vehicle current year vehicle with a gasoline engine in terms of its MPG-e combined gasoline/electricity rating.)
BMW i8 EPA ratings
BMW i8 Coupé; BMW i8 Roadster	2019; 2020	Electricity only 18 mi (29 km)	69 mpg‑e 49 kWh/100 mi; 30 kWh/100 km	—	(Note: The i8 did not use any gasoline for the first 18 miles in EPA tests. It may use gasoline depending on how you drive.)
BMW i8 Coupé; BMW i8 Roadster	2019; 2020	Gasoline only 303 mi (488 km)	27 mpg_{‑US} 8.7 L/100 km	26 / 29 mpg_{‑US} 9.0 / 8.1 L/100 km	(Note: The i8 did not use any gasoline for the first 18 miles in EPA tests. It may use gasoline depending on how you drive.)
BMW i8	2014; 2015; 2016; 2017	Electricity only 15 mi (24 km)	76 mpg‑e 44 kWh/100 mi; 28 kWh/100 km	—	(Note: The i8 did not use any gasoline for the first 15 miles in EPA tests. It may use gasoline depending on how you drive. There is no 2018 model year rated.)
BMW i8	2014; 2015; 2016; 2017	Gasoline only 315 mi (507 km)	28 mpg_{‑US} 8.4 L/100 km	28 / 29 mpg_{‑US} 8.4 / 8.1 L/100 km	(Note: The i8 did not use any gasoline for the first 15 miles in EPA tests. It may use gasoline depending on how you drive. There is no 2018 model year rated.)

=== BMW iX ===
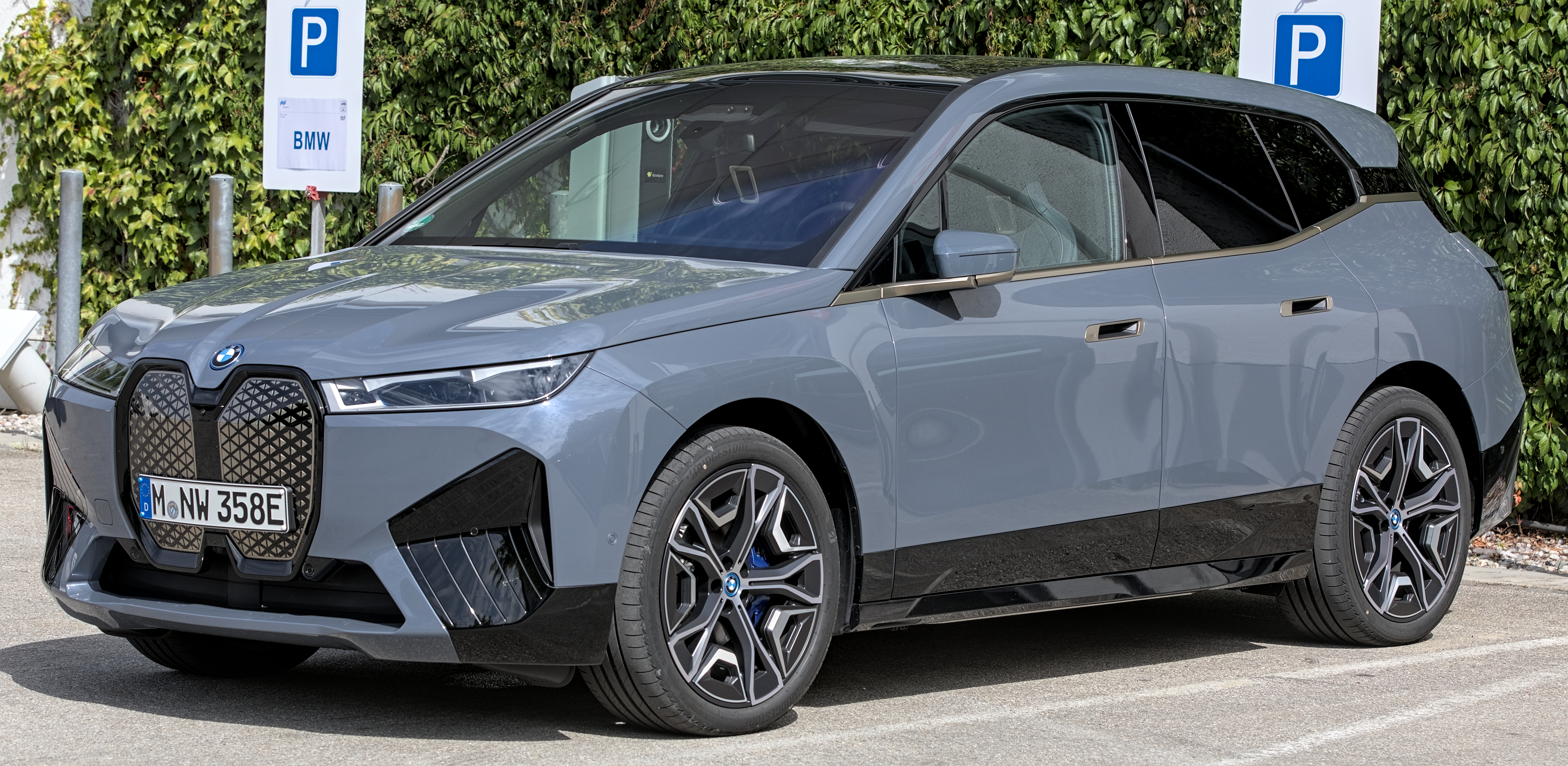
BMW iX

The BMW iX is the first purpose-built electric vehicle by BMW since the i3 from 2013. The iX nameplate was chosen to signify the model's position at the top of the electric BMW i line-up and its role in showcasing technology. The electric platform is a "totally new development", though it is "highly compatible" with the modular CLAR platform. BMW plans the iX to become the basis for fleets of fully autonomous vehicles for highway use, and eventually to be available as robotaxis in cities.

== BMW iPerformance ==
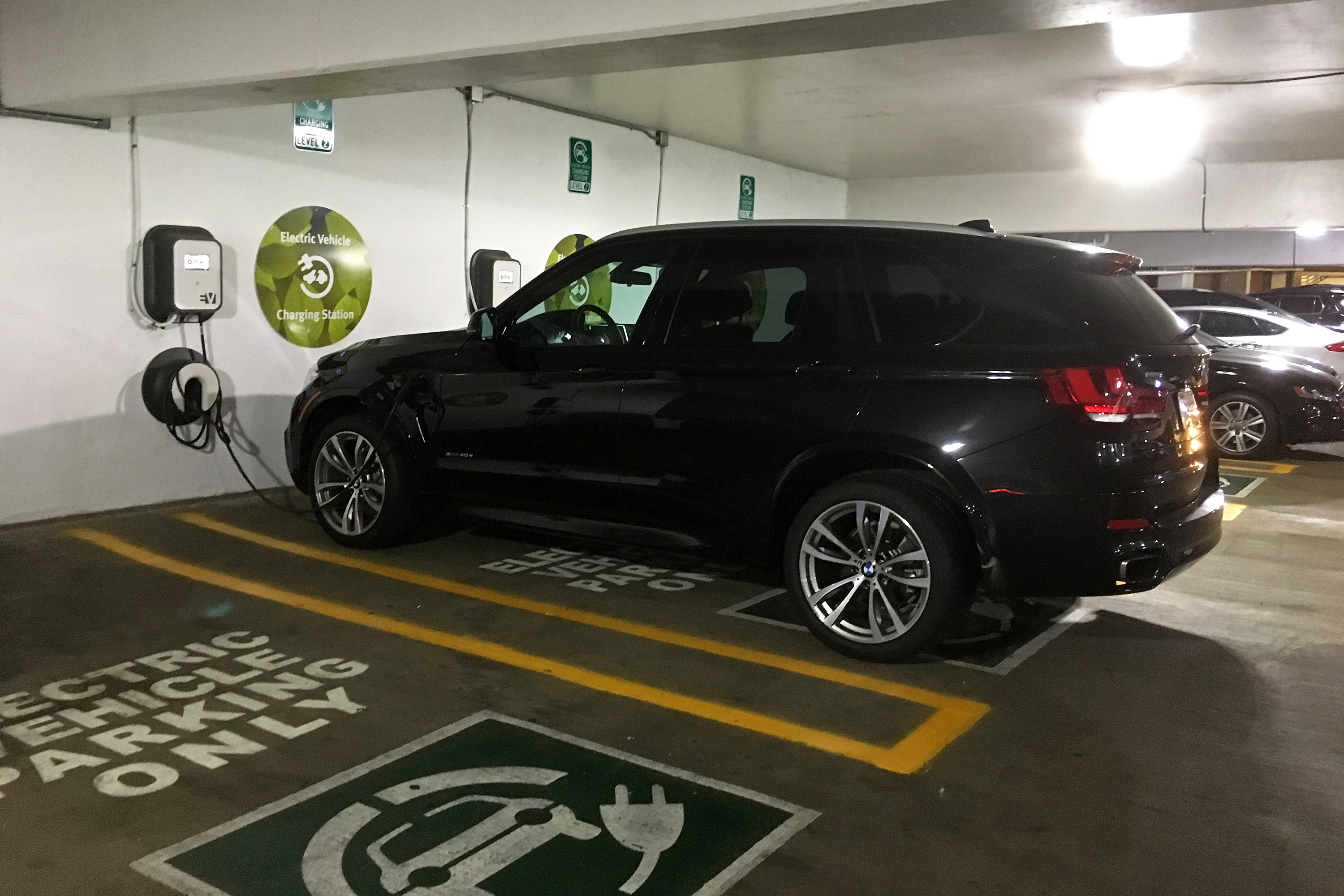
The BMW X5 xDrive40e is a plug-in hybrid with an all-electric range of 23 km (14 mi) that uses BMW i cars technology.

Launched in Europe and the U.S. in 2015, the BMW X5 xDrive40e is the first plug-in hybrid released under the core BMW brand. The use of BMW's eDrive technology on the established X5 platform is a direct technology transfer from the BMW i cars, in particular, from the BMW i8 technology.

In February 2016, BMW announced the introduction of the "iPerformance" model designation, which was given to all BMW plug-in hybrid vehicles from July 2016. The aim is to provide a visible indicator of the transfer of technology from BMW i to the BMW core brand. The first BMW car launched to the market with the "iPerformance" model designation was the BMW 330e iPerformance, initially named the 330e. Deliveries in the American market began in the second quarter of 2016. The new designation was also used on the plug-in hybrid variants of the new BMW 7 Series, the BMW 740e iPerformance. The iPerformance models have a BMW i logo on the front side panel, BMW i-style blue elements in the kidney grille and wheel hubs, and an eDrive logo on the C-pillar.

As of November 2016, four BMW electrified models had been released, the BMW X5 xDrive40e, BMW 225xe Active Tourer, BMW 330e iPerformance, and the BMW 740e iPerformance. The BMW 530e iPerformance was released in Europe March 2017 as part of the seventh generation BMW 5 Series line-up. The Mini Cooper S E Countryman ALL4 plug-in hybrid was released in June 2017. The BMW X1 xDrive25e crossover was introduced in January 2020. The BMW X3 xDrive30e was released in Europe in the first quarter of 2020. Sales of the BMW X2 xDrive25e crossover are slated to begin in Europe in July 2020.

== Gallery ==
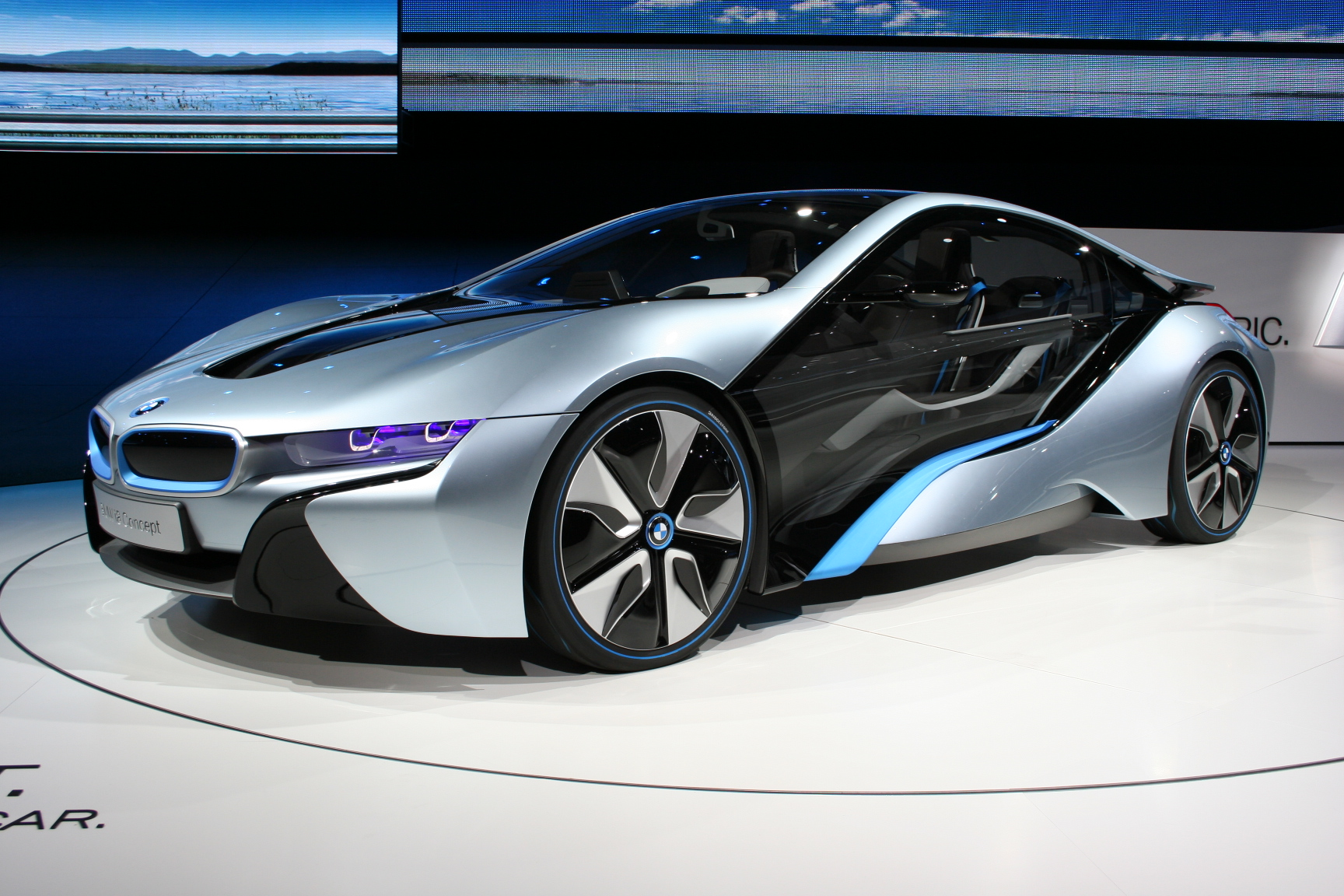
BMW i8 concept plug-in hybrid

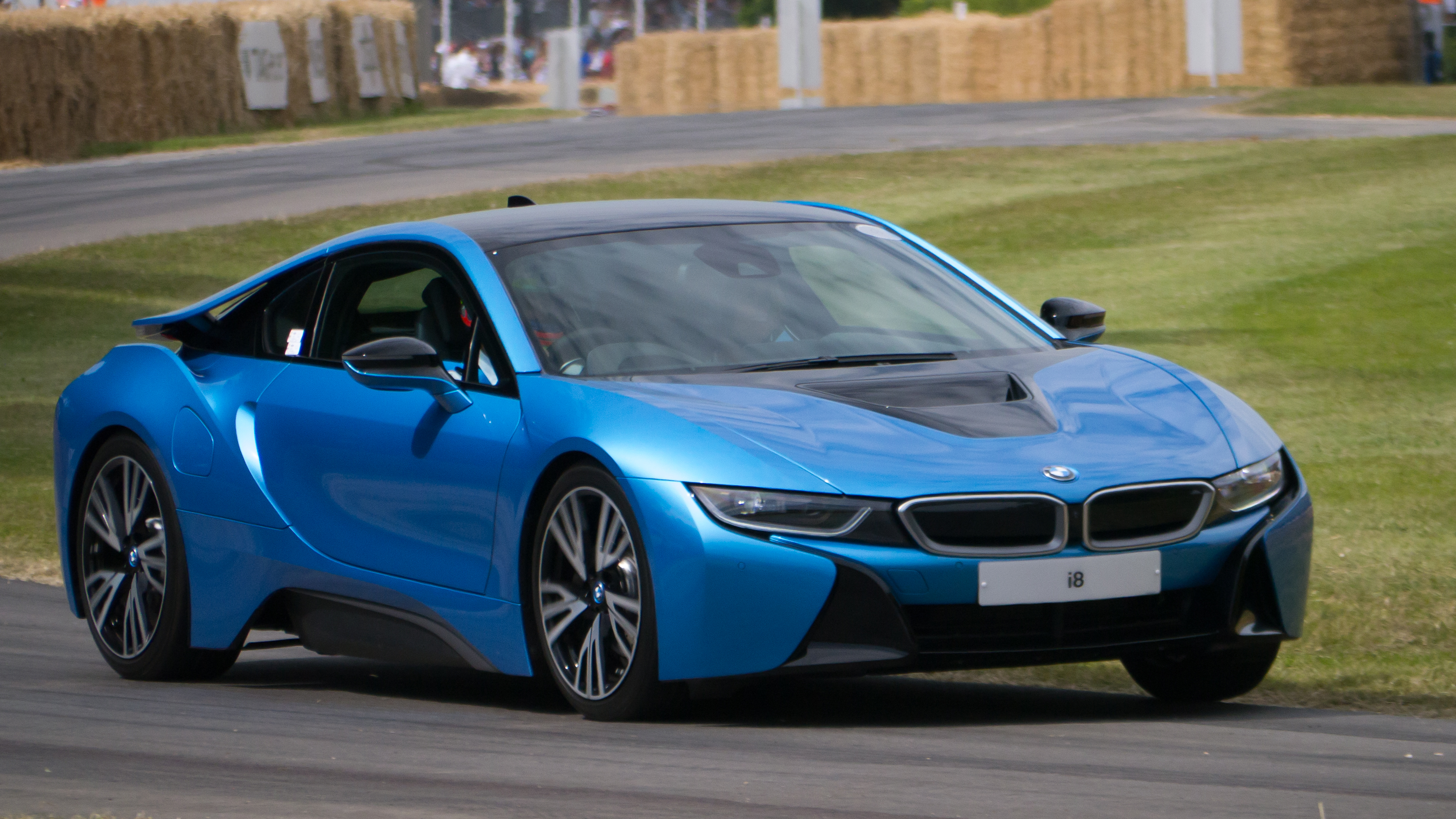
Production BMW i8 plug-in hybrid

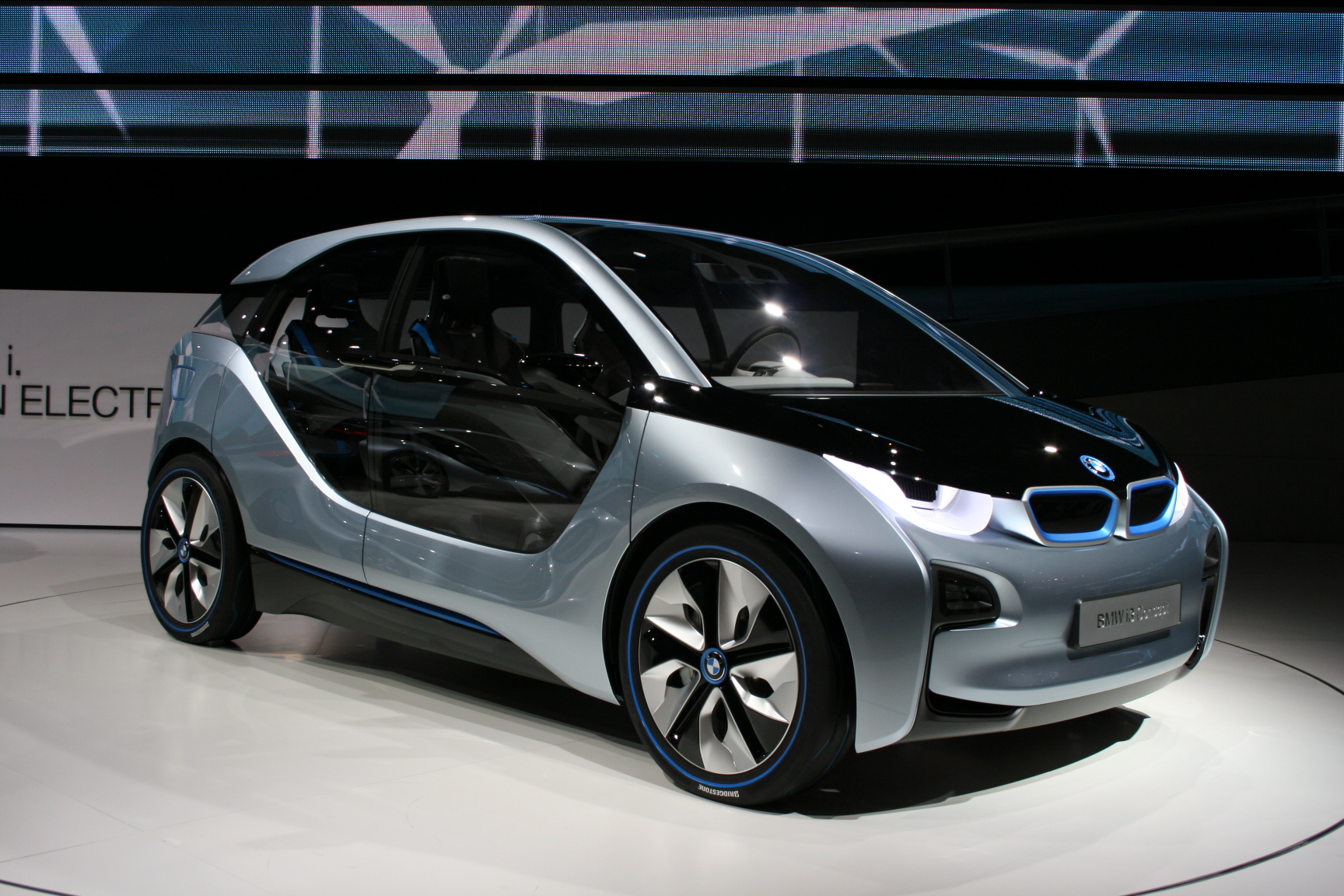
BMW i3 concept electric car

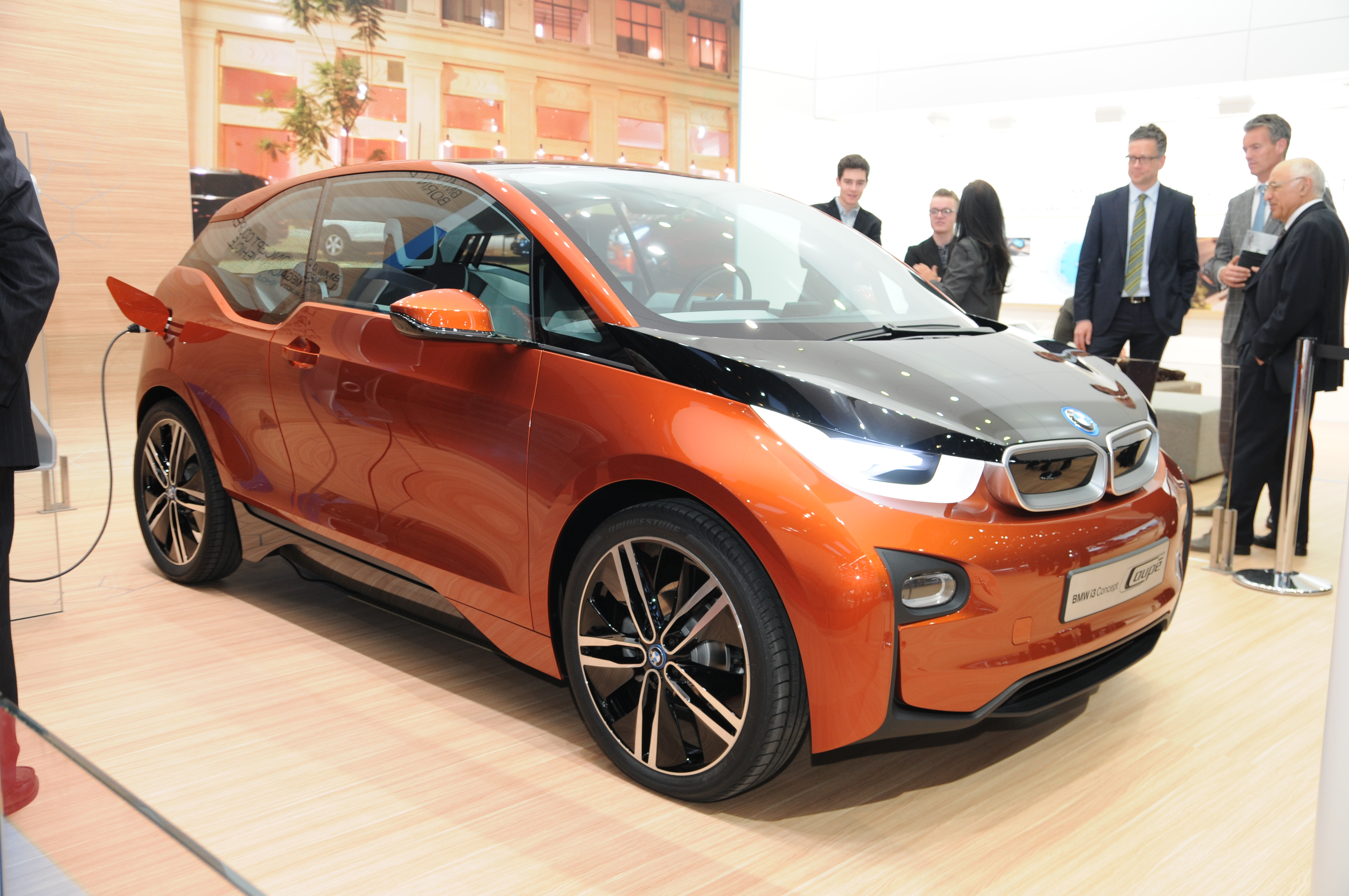
The BMW i3 Concept Coupé exhibited at the 2013 Geneva Motor Show.

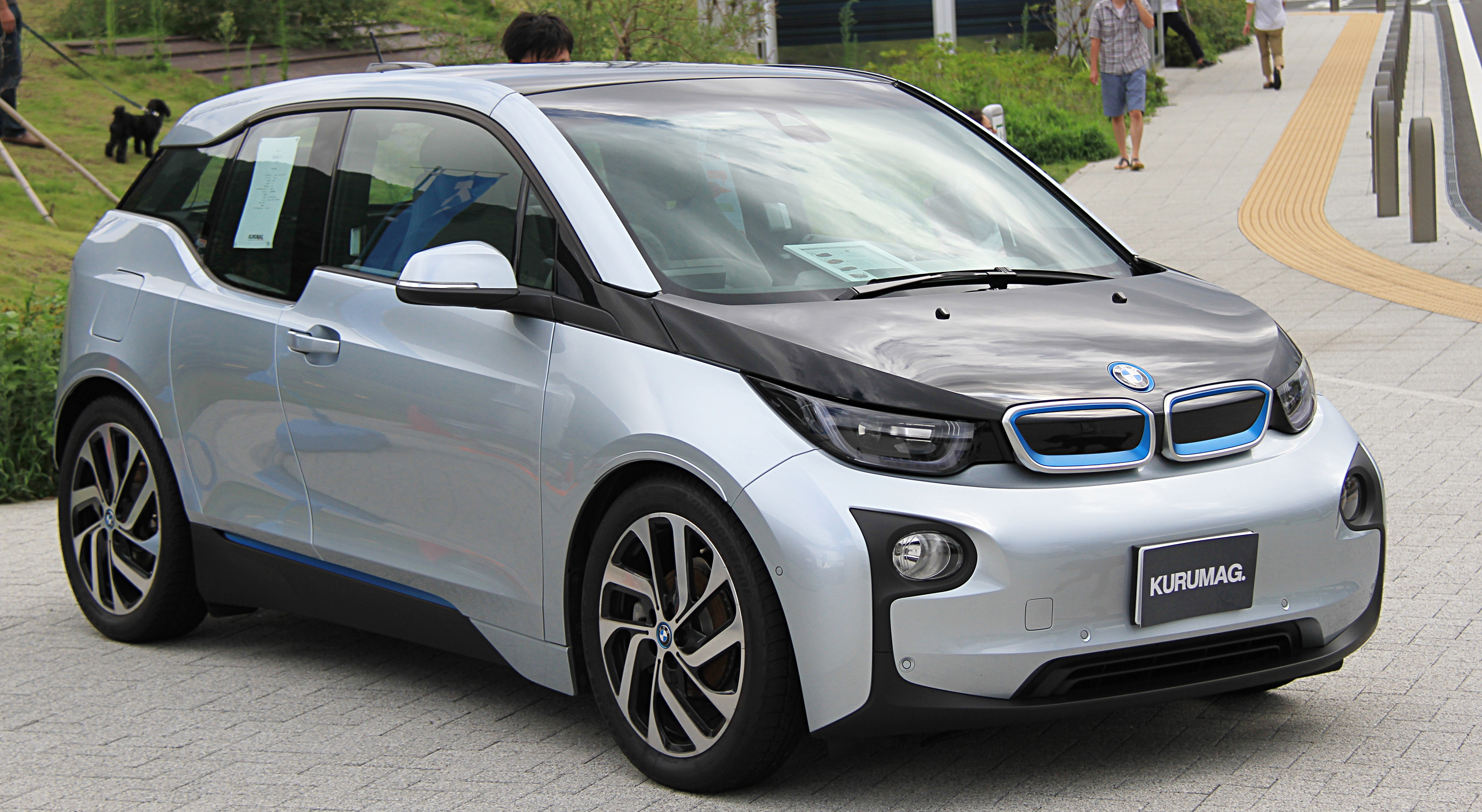
Production BMW i3 all-electric car

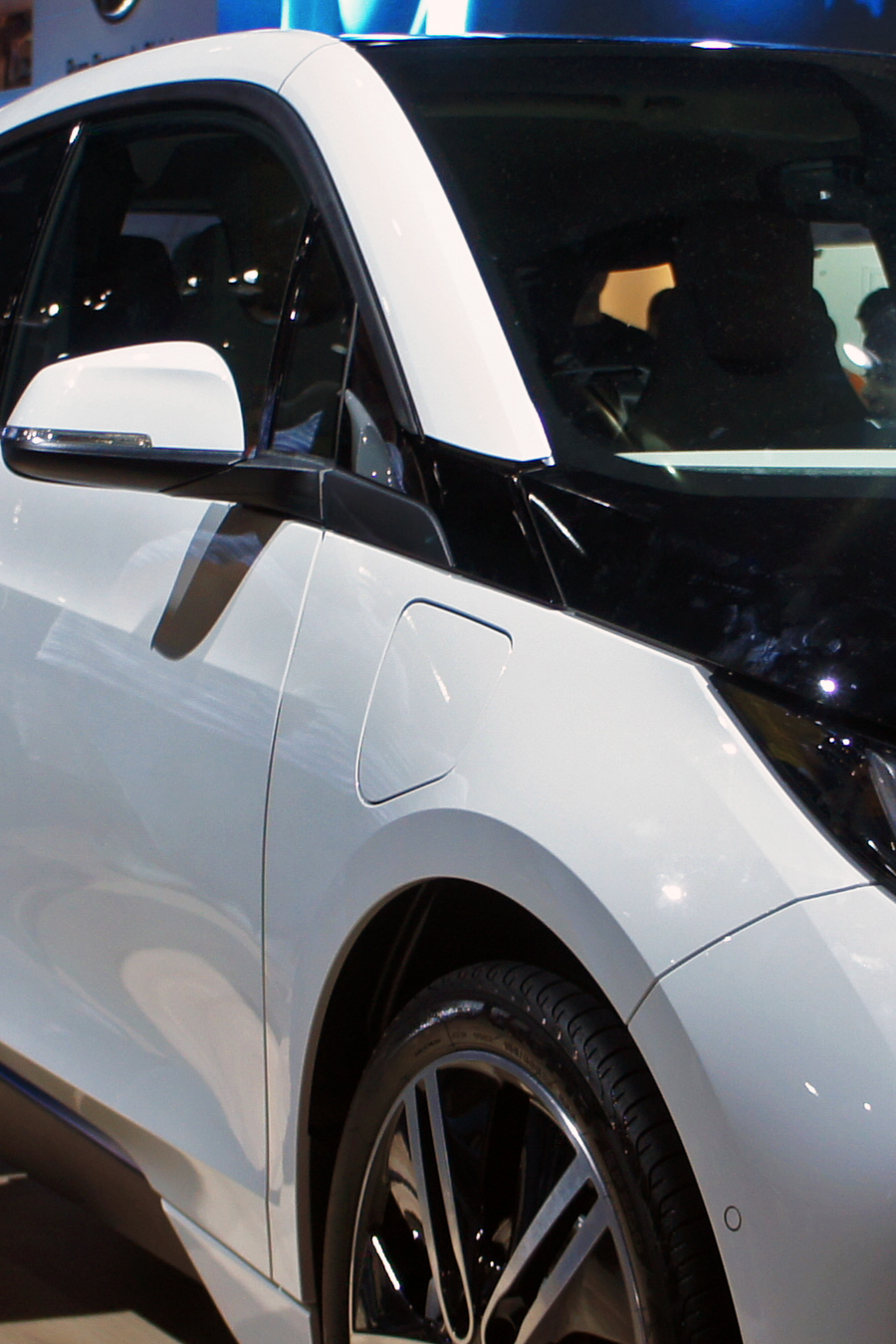
Production BMW i3 with range-extender (REx) option

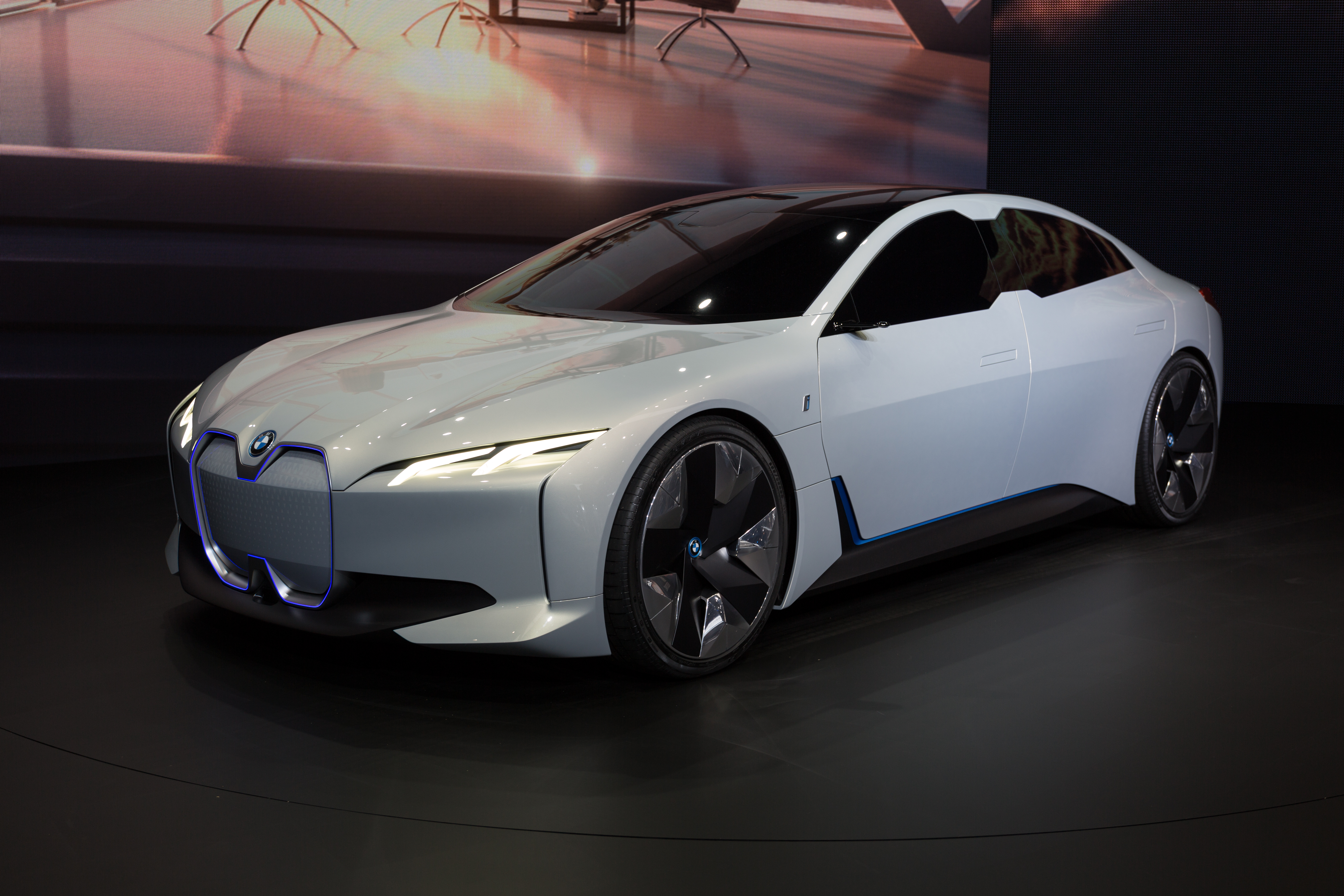
BMW i Vision Dynamics concept electric car (2017)

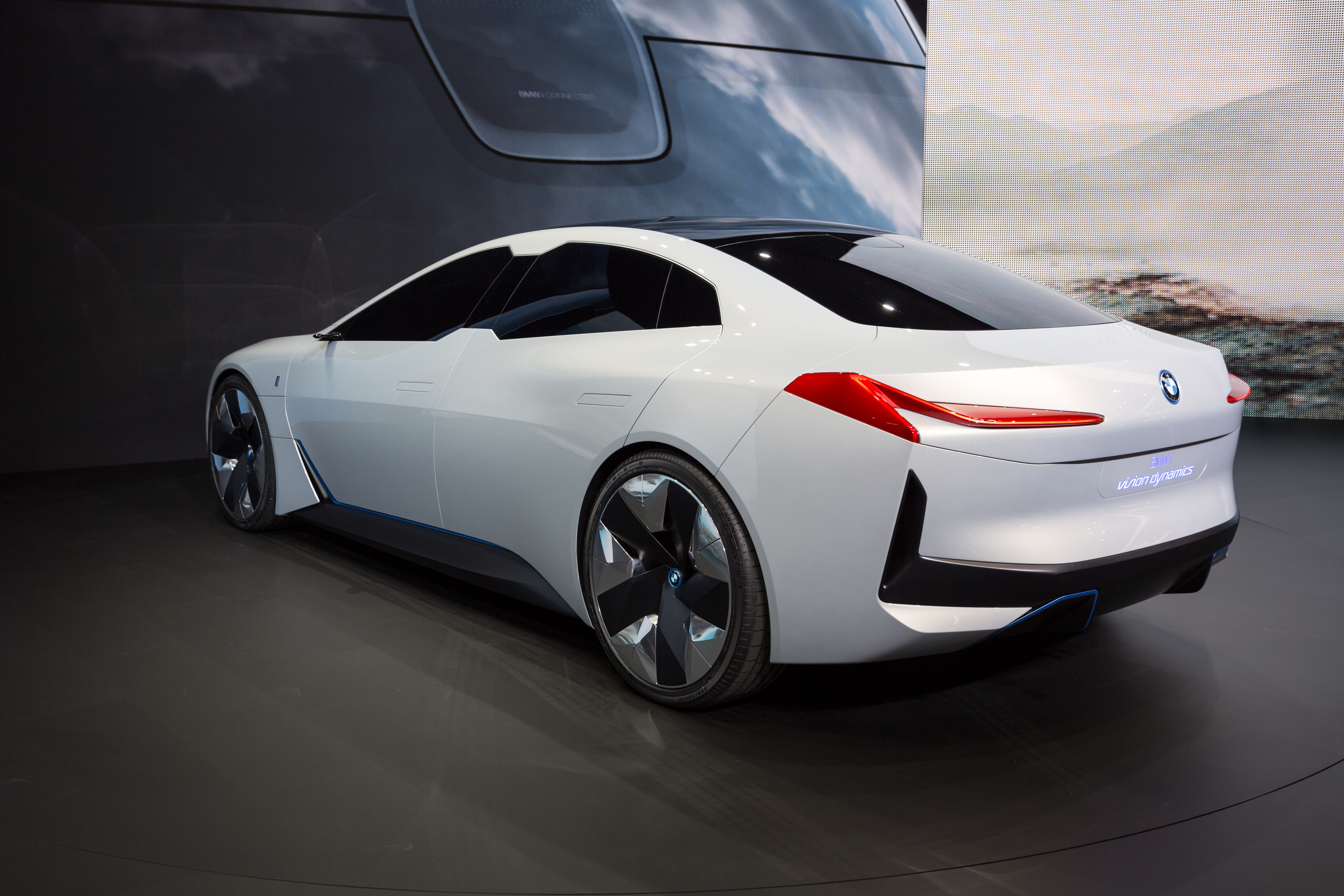
BMW i Vision Dynamics concept electric car (2017)

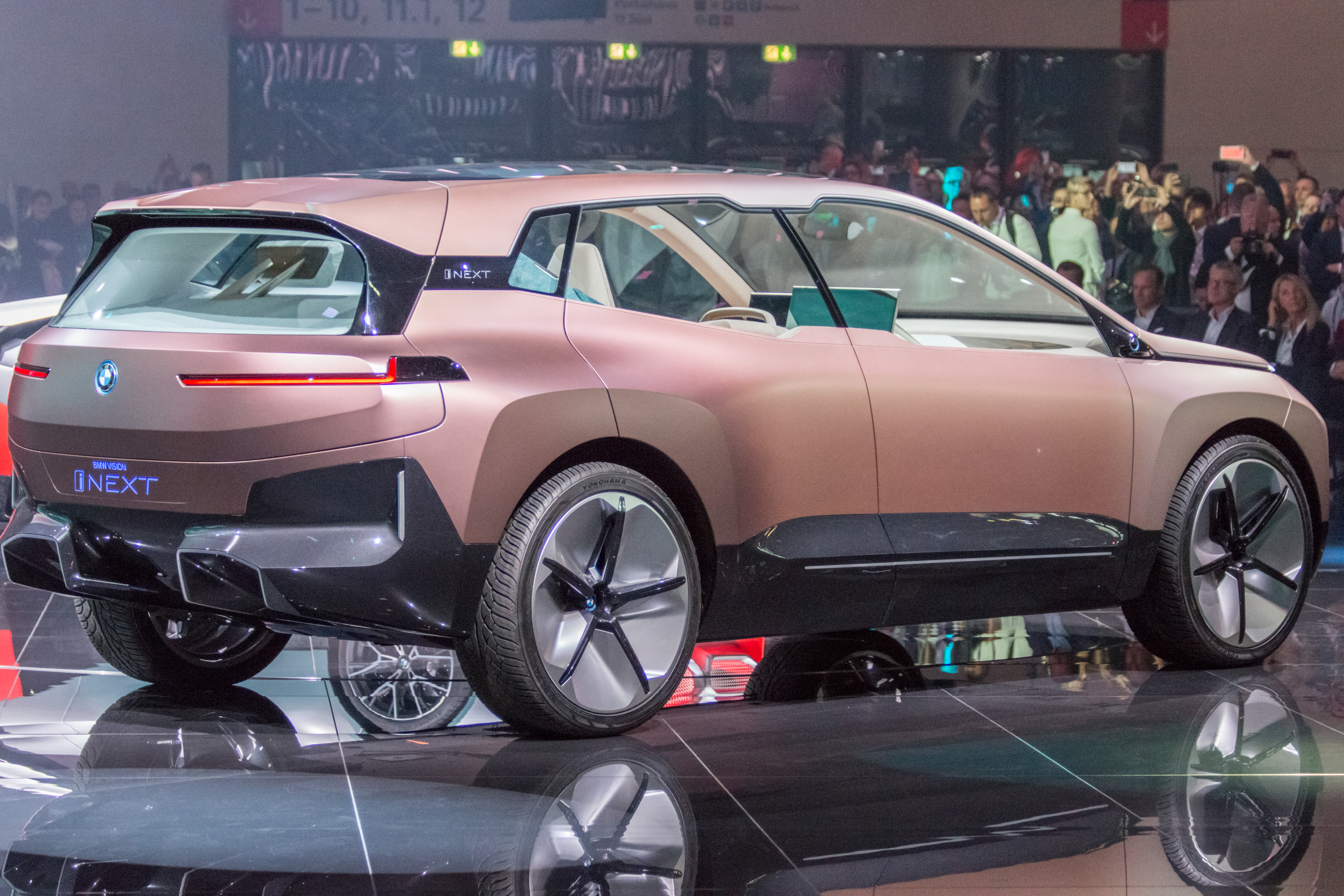
BMW i Next concept

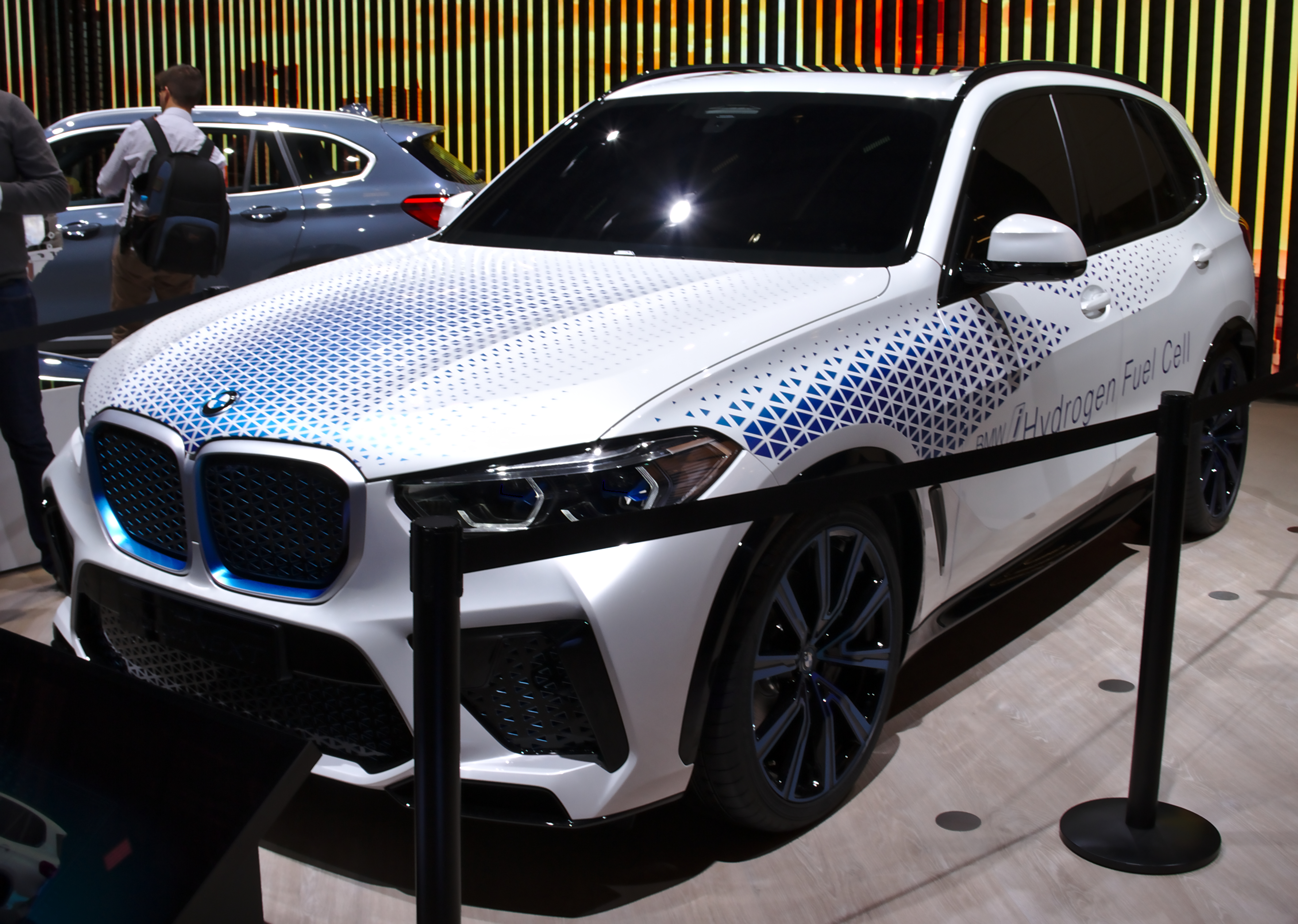
BMW i Hydrogen Next concept

== See also ==
- Electric car
- Electric car use by country
- Government incentives for plug-in electric vehicles
- List of production battery electric vehicles
- Plug-in electric vehicle
- Plug-in hybrid
- BMW Group
- Range extender
