= 2022 Jakarta ePrix =

Race 9 of 16 of the 2021–22 Formula E season
← Previous race	Next race →
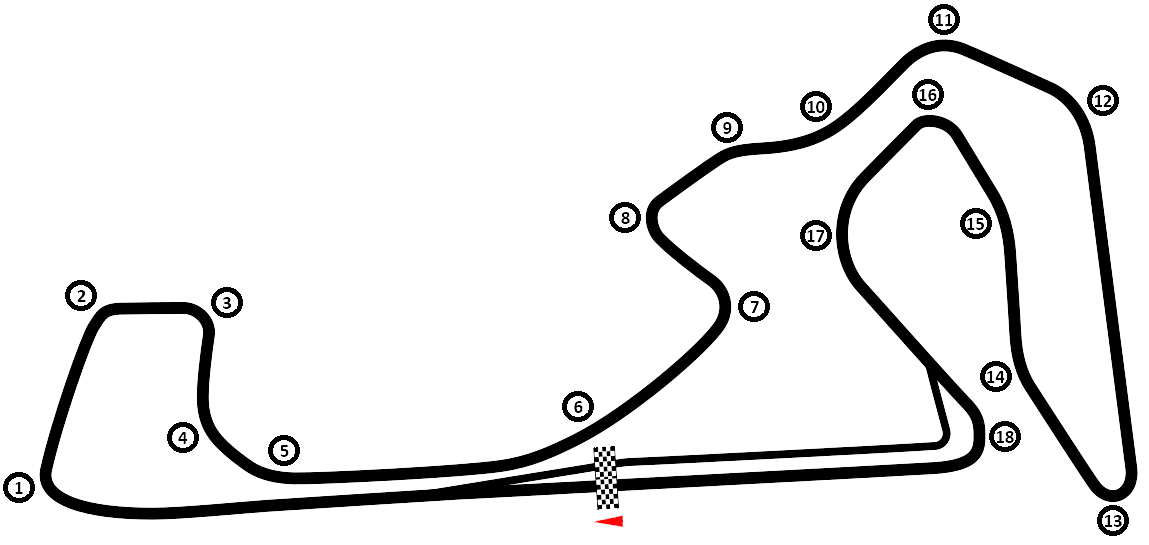

Race details
- Date: 4 June 2022
- Official name: 2022 Jakarta E-Prix
- Location: Jakarta International e-Prix Circuit, Ancol, Jakarta, Indonesia
- Course: Street circuit
- Course length: 2.370 km (1.473 mi)
- Distance: 40 laps, 94.800 km (58.906 mi)

Pole position
Driver	(France) Jean-Éric Vergne	DS Techeetah
- Time: 1:08:523

Fastest lap
Driver	(New Zealand) Mitch Evans	Jaguar
- Time: 1:09:786 on lap 26

Podium
First	(New Zealand) Mitch Evans	Jaguar
Second	(France) Jean-Éric Vergne	DS Techeetah
Third	(Switzerland) Edoardo Mortara	Venturi

The 2022 Jakarta ePrix was a Formula E electric car races held at the Jakarta International e-Prix Circuit in Ancol, northern Jakarta on 4 June 2022. It served as the 9th rounds of the 2021-22 Formula E season and the inaugural running of the Jakarta ePrix. The race was won by Mitch Evans for Jaguar, with Jean-Éric Vergne and Edoardo Mortara in second and third place respectively.

== Background ==
Following the 2022 Berlin ePrix, Stoffel Vandoorne leads the driver's championship with a 12 point gap to Edoardo Mortara. Jean-Éric Vergne enters the round in 3rd, ahead of Mitch Evans.

== Classification ==
=== Qualifying ===
Group draw
Group A	(Belgium) VAN	(France) JEV	(Netherlands) FRI	(Germany) LOT	(Brazil) DIG	(United Kingdom) DEN	(New Zealand) CAS	(Switzerland) BUE	(Germany) GUE	(United States) ASK	(Brazil) SET
Group B	(Switzerland) MOR	(New Zealand) EVA	(Netherlands) DEV	(Germany) WEH	(Portugal) DAC	(United Kingdom) BIR	(United Kingdom) ROW	(United Kingdom) TUR	(United Kingdom) SIM	(United Kingdom) TIC	(Italy) GIO

Qualifying duels

Quarter-finals
B4	(New Zealand) Mitch Evans
A1	(Belgium) Stoffel Vandoorne
B3	(Germany) Pascal Wehrlein
A2	(France) Jean-Éric Vergne
A3	(United Kingdom) Jake Dennis
B2	(Switzerland) Edoardo Mortara
A4	(Switzerland) Sébastien Buemi
B1	(Portugal) António Félix da Costa

Semi-finals
(New Zealand) Mitch Evans
(France) Jean-Éric Vergne
(Switzerland) Edoardo Mortara
(Portugal) António Félix da Costa

Final
(France) Jean-Éric Vergne
(Portugal) António Félix da Costa

Overall Classification

Pos.	No.	Driver	Team	A	B	QF	SF	F	Grid
1	25	(France) Jean-Éric Vergne	DS Techeetah	1:08:898	—N/a	1:08:917	1:08:358	1:08:523	1
2	13	(Portugal) António Félix da Costa	DS Techeetah	—N/a	1:08:715	1:08:336	1:08:281	1:09:340	2
3	20	(New Zealand) Mitch Evans	Jaguar	—N/a	1:09:045	1:08:935	1:08:6458	—N/a	3
4	48	(Switzerland) Edoardo Mortara	Venturi-Mercedes	—N/a	1:08:716	1:08:419	1:08:693	—N/a	4
5	27	(United Kingdom) Jake Dennis	Andretti-BMW	1:08.988	—N/a	1:08:653	—N/a	—N/a	5
6	94	(Germany) Pascal Wehrlein	Porsche	—N/a	1:08:974	1:09:029	—N/a	—N/a	11^{1}
7	23	(Switzerland) Sébastien Buemi	e.dams-Nissan	1:09:098	—N/a	1:09:188	—N/a	—N/a	6
8	5	(Belgium) Stoffel Vandoorne	Mercedes	1:08:829	—N/a	1:09:268	—N/a	—N/a	7
9	36	(Germany) André Lotterer	Porsche	1:09:101	—N/a	—N/a	—N/a	—N/a	8
10	17	(Netherlands) Nyck de Vries	Mercedes	—N/a	1:09:078	—N/a	—N/a	—N/a	9
11	11	(Brazil) Lucas di Grassi	Venturi-Mercedes	1:09:118	—N/a	—N/a	—N/a	—N/a	10
12	30	(United Kingdom) Oliver Rowland	Mahindra	—N/a	1:09:134	—N/a	—N/a	—N/a	12
13	37	(New Zealand) Nick Cassidy	Envision-Audi	1:09:157	—N/a	—N/a	—N/a	—N/a	13
14	10	(United Kingdom) Sam Bird	Jaguar	—N/a	1:09:148	—N/a	—N/a	—N/a	14
15	22	(Germany) Maximilian Günther	e.dams-Nissan	1:09:266	—N/a	—N/a	—N/a	—N/a	15
16	3	(United Kingdom) Oliver Turvey	NIO	—N/a	1:09:413	—N/a	—N/a	—N/a	16
17	7	(Brazil) Sérgio Sette Câmara	Dragon-Penske	1:09:406	—N/a	—N/a	—N/a	—N/a	17
18	33	(United Kingdom) Dan Ticktum	NIO	—N/a	1:09:688	—N/a	—N/a	—N/a	18
19	28	(United States) Oliver Askew	Andretti-BMW	1:09:524	—N/a	—N/a	—N/a	—N/a	19
20	29	(United Kingdom) Alexander Sims	Mahindra	—N/a	1:09:723	—N/a	—N/a	—N/a	20
21	4	(Netherlands) Robin Frijns	Envision-Audi	—N/a	—N/a	—N/a	—N/a	—N/a	21
22	99	(Italy) Antonio Giovinazzi	Dragon-Penske	—N/a	1:18.034	—N/a	—N/a	—N/a	22

Notes:

- ^1 – Wehrlein received a 5-place grid penalty for a technical infringement.

=== Race ===
Pos.	No.	Driver	Team	Laps	Time/Retired	Grid	Points
1	20	(New Zealand) Mitch Evans	Jaguar	40	48:28:424	3	25+1^{2}
2	25	(France) Jean-Éric Vergne	DS Techeetah	40	+0.733	1	18+3^{1}
3	48	(Switzerland) Edoardo Mortara	Venturi-Mercedes	40	+0.967	4	15
4	13	(Portugal) António Félix da Costa	DS Techeetah	40	+3.350	2	12
5	5	(Belgium) Stoffel Vandoorne	Mercedes	40	+4.038	7	10
6	27	(United Kingdom) Jake Dennis	Andretti-BMW	40	+4.635	5	8
7	11	(Brazil) Lucas di Grassi	Venturi-Mercedes	40	+5.253	10	6
8	94	(Germany) Pascal Wehrlein	Porsche	40	+8.191	11	4
9	36	(Germany) André Lotterer	Porsche	40	+11.089	8	2
10	10	(United Kingdom) Sam Bird	Jaguar	40	+13.348	14	1
11	23	(Switzerland) Sébastien Buemi	e.dams-Nissan	40	+14.766	6	
12	3	(United Kingdom) Oliver Turvey	NIO	40	+20.922	16	
13	28	(United States) Oliver Askew	Andretti-BMW	40	+23.020	19	
14	22	(Germany) Maximilian Günther	e.dams-Nissan	40	+25.184	15	
15	29	(United Kingdom) Alexander Sims	Mahindra	40	+29.520	20	
16	37	(New Zealand) Nick Cassidy	Envision-Audi	40	+29.873	13	
17	4	(Netherlands) Robin Frijns	Envision-Audi	40	+30.854	21	
18	33	(United Kingdom) Dan Ticktum	NIO	40	+31.827	22	
19	7	(Brazil) Sérgio Sette Câmara	Dragon-Penske	40	+38.218	17	
Ret	99	(Italy) Antonio Giovinazzi	Dragon-Penske	37	Out of Energy	22	
Ret	17	(Netherlands) Nyck de Vries	Mercedes	29	Puncture	9	
Ret	30	(United Kingdom) Oliver Rowland	Mahindra	1	Lost Wheel	12	

Notes:

- ^1 – Pole position.
- ^2 – Fastest lap.

=== Standings after the race ===
Drivers' Championship standings

	Pos	Driver	Points
	1	(Belgium) Stoffel Vandoorne	121
1	2	(France) Jean-Éric Vergne	116
1	3	(Switzerland) Edoardo Mortara	114
	4	(New Zealand) Mitch Evans	109
	5	(Netherlands) Robin Frijns	81

Teams' Championship standings

	Pos	Constructor	Points
	1	(Germany) Mercedes	186
1	2	(France) DS Techeetah	170
1	3	(Monaco) Venturi-Mercedes	169
	4	(United Kingdom) Jaguar	139
	5	(Germany) Porsche	114

- Notes: Only the top five positions are included for both sets of standings.

Previous race: 2022 Berlin ePrix	FIA Formula E World Championship; 2021–22 season	Next race: 2022 Marrakesh ePrix
Previous race: N/A	Jakarta ePrix	Next race: 2023 Jakarta ePrix
