= 2021–22 Formula E World Championship =

Electric car racing season

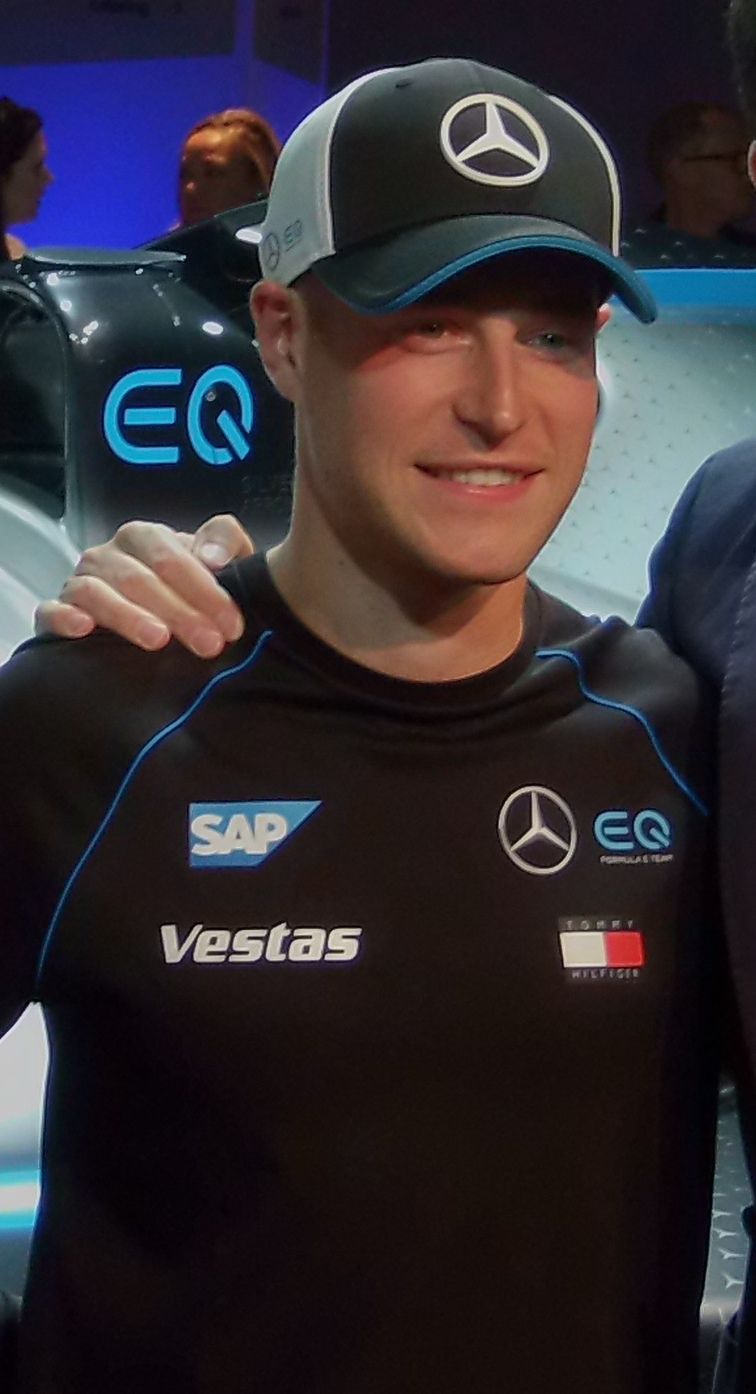
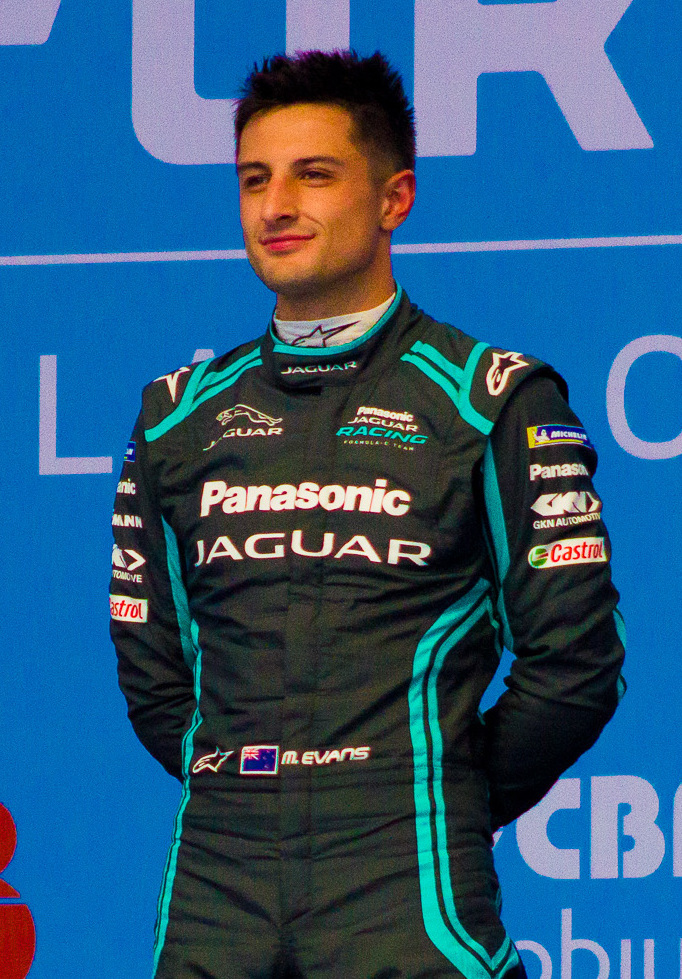
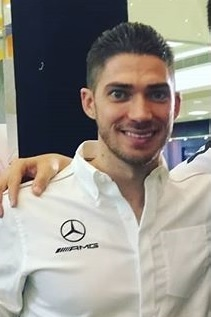
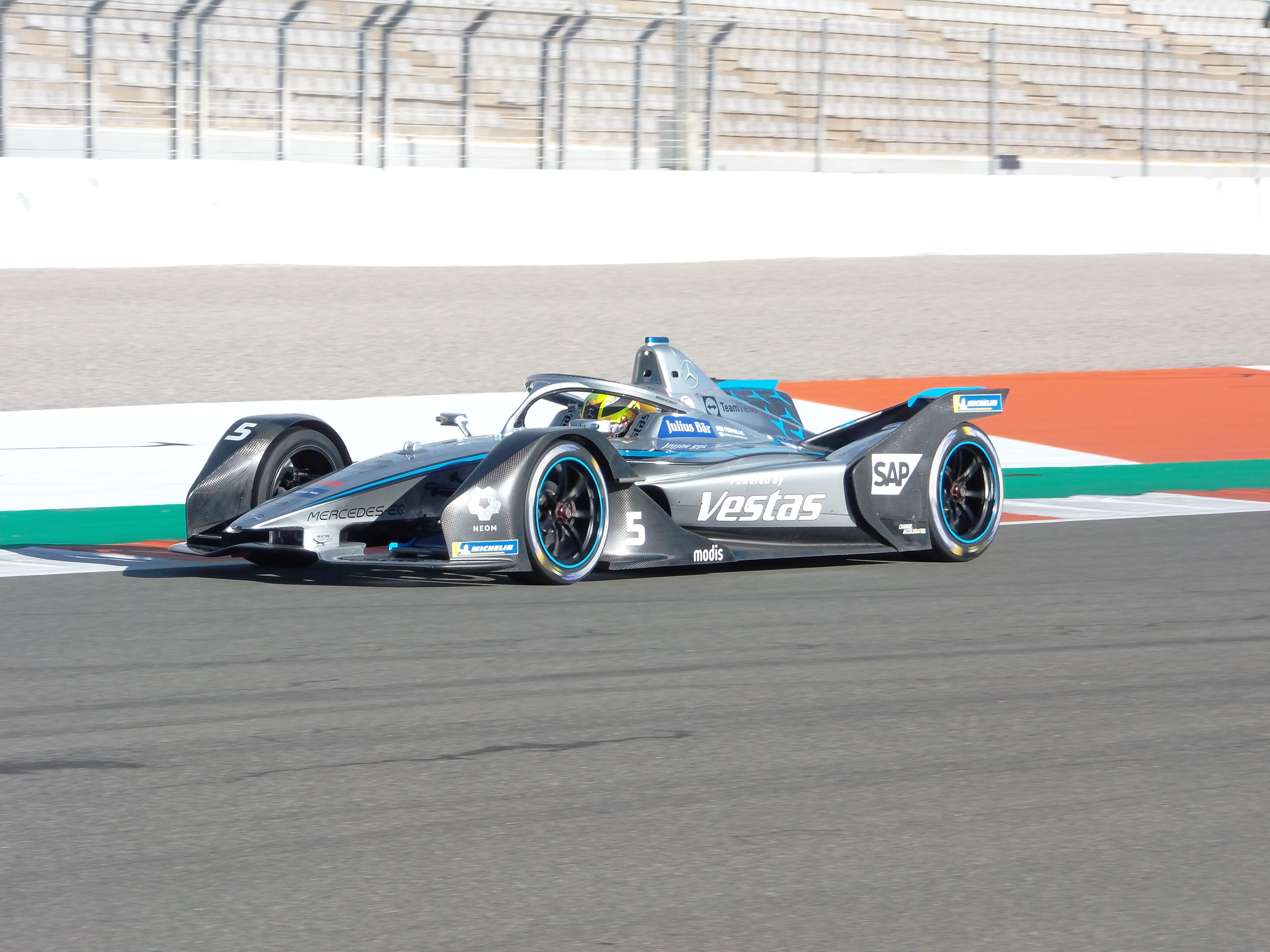
Stoffel Vandoorne (top) won his first world championship, driving for Mercedes-EQ. Mitch Evans (left) was runner up, driving for Jaguar. Edoardo Mortara (right) was third, driving for Venturi. Mercedes-EQ (bottom) successfully defended their Teams' Championship.

The 2021–22 ABB FIA Formula E World Championship was the eighth season of the FIA Formula E championship, a motor racing championship for electrically powered vehicles recognised by motorsport's governing body, the Fédération Internationale de l'Automobile (FIA), as the highest class of competition for electric open-wheel racing cars.

It was the final season of the Formula E Gen2 era, with the Formula E Gen3 being used from the 2022–23 season onwards.

== Teams and drivers ==
All teams used a spec Spark SRT05e chassis and Michelin tyres.

Team	Powertrain	No.	Drivers	Rounds
(China) NIO 333 Formula E Team	NIO 333 001	3	(United Kingdom) Oliver Turvey	All
(China) NIO 333 Formula E Team	NIO 333 001	33	(United Kingdom) Dan Ticktum	All
(United Kingdom) Envision Racing	Audi e-tron FE07	4	(Netherlands) Robin Frijns	All
(United Kingdom) Envision Racing	Audi e-tron FE07	37	(New Zealand) Nick Cassidy	All
(Germany) Mercedes-EQ Formula E Team	Mercedes-EQ Silver Arrow 02	5	(Belgium) Stoffel Vandoorne	All
(Germany) Mercedes-EQ Formula E Team	Mercedes-EQ Silver Arrow 02	17	(Netherlands) Nyck de Vries	All
(United States) Dragon / Penske Autosport	Penske EV-5	7	(Brazil) Sérgio Sette Câmara	All
(United States) Dragon / Penske Autosport	Penske EV-5	99	(Italy) Antonio Giovinazzi	All
(United States) Dragon / Penske Autosport	Penske EV-5	99	(France) Sacha Fenestraz	16
(United Kingdom) Jaguar TCS Racing	Jaguar I-Type 5	9	(New Zealand) Mitch Evans	All
(United Kingdom) Jaguar TCS Racing	Jaguar I-Type 5	10	(United Kingdom) Sam Bird	1–14
(United Kingdom) Jaguar TCS Racing	Jaguar I-Type 5	10	(France) Norman Nato	15–16
(Monaco) ROKiT Venturi Racing	Mercedes-EQ Silver Arrow 02	11	(Brazil) Lucas di Grassi	All
(Monaco) ROKiT Venturi Racing	Mercedes-EQ Silver Arrow 02	48	(Switzerland) Edoardo Mortara	All
(France) DS Techeetah	DS E-Tense FE21	13	(Portugal) António Félix da Costa	All
(France) DS Techeetah	DS E-Tense FE21	25	(France) Jean-Éric Vergne	All
(France) Nissan e.dams	Nissan IM03	22	(Germany) Maximilian Günther	All
(France) Nissan e.dams	Nissan IM03	23	(Switzerland) Sébastien Buemi	All
(United States) Avalanche Andretti Formula E	BMW i FE.21	27	(United Kingdom) Jake Dennis	All
(United States) Avalanche Andretti Formula E	BMW i FE.21	28	(United States) Oliver Askew	All
(India) Mahindra Racing	Mahindra M8Electro	29	(United Kingdom) Alexander Sims	All
(India) Mahindra Racing	Mahindra M8Electro	30	(United Kingdom) Oliver Rowland	All
(Germany) TAG Heuer Porsche Formula E Team	Porsche 99X Electric (Note: The 99X Electric branding has been used for every Formula E powertrain developed by Porsche ever since their debut season. This was the second powertrain.)	36	(Germany) André Lotterer	All
(Germany) TAG Heuer Porsche Formula E Team	Porsche 99X Electric	94	(Germany) Pascal Wehrlein	All

=== Team changes ===
- As announced on 30 November 2020, Audi Sport and their team Abt Sportsline have left Formula E at the end of the 2020–21 season. However, Audi remained in the sport until the end of the 2021–22 season as powertrain supplier for Envision Racing.
- As announced on 2 December 2020, BMW have left Formula E at the end of the 2020–21 season. However, they remained in the sport as a powertrain supplier for the 2021–22 season as Andretti Autosport, having been in a partnership with them.
- On 18 August 2021, Mercedes-Benz announced that this would be their last season in Formula E.
- On 1 November 2021, Envision Virgin Racing announced that the team would be rebranded as Envision Racing for the 2021–22 season as the Envision Group had taken complete ownership of the race team.
- On 2 November 2021, Jaguar Racing announced that the team would be rebranded as Jaguar TCS Racing for the 2021–22 season as a result of a title sponsorship deal with Tata Consultancy Services.

=== Driver changes ===
- On 23 June 2021, Oliver Rowland announced his switch from Nissan e.dams to Mahindra Racing.
- On 2 September 2021, Maximilian Günther announced his switch from Andretti Autosport to Nissan e.dams.
- On 15 September 2021, former Audi Sport driver Lucas di Grassi announced his signing for Venturi Racing, replacing Norman Nato and joining Edoardo Mortara.
- On 10 October 2021, René Rast announced he would be unable to return for the 2022 Formula E season as he returned to the DTM series instead, citing the commitment requirement for DTM.
- On 13 November 2021, Alex Lynn announced that he had signed to race in the IMSA SportsCar Championship and was not going to be returning to Formula E.
- On 16 November 2021, it was announced that former Formula One driver Antonio Giovinazzi would switch to Formula E with Dragon / Penske Autosport, replacing Joel Eriksson.
- On 17 November 2021, Tom Blomqvist announced that he would not be returning to Formula E for he would be racing in the IMSA SportsCar Championship instead.
- On 24 November 2021, 2019 Indy Lights champion and former IndyCar driver Oliver Askew joined Andretti Autosport. He is the first American to compete full-time in the series.
- On 25 November 2021, two-time Macau Grand Prix winner Dan Ticktum announced he would partner Oliver Turvey in the NIO 333 FE Team, making the switch from Formula 2.

=== Mid-season changes ===
Following the London ePrix, Jaguar driver Sam Bird sustained a wrist fracture, with the team declaring him unable to participate in the Seoul ePrix. Jaguar's reserve driver Norman Nato was announced to be replacing Bird in the season-ending event. Sacha Fenestraz, having been a reserve driver for Jaguar in 2021, replaced Antonio Giovinazzi for the second Seoul ePrix after the latter suffered a hand injury during the first event.

== Calendar ==
The following ePrix were contracted to form a part of the 2021–22 Formula E World Championship:

The Seoul ePrix was first scheduled for the 2019–20 season, but was cancelled twice because of the COVID-19 pandemic. The Mexico City ePrix made a return for 2022, once again at Autódromo Hermanos Rodríguez, after the race relocated to Autódromo Miguel E. Abed in Puebla in 2021. A new event, the Vancouver ePrix, was scheduled to be held on the site of the former Champ Car and IndyCar race, the Molson Indy Vancouver, utilising a different layout to those used previously.

On 15 October 2021, the calendar was updated, with the planned Cape Town ePrix cancelled for unknown reasons in favor of the Jakarta ePrix.

On 15 December 2021, the calendar was updated again, in which the Rome ePrix and the Berlin ePrix were once again made into double-header events, as was the previous season.

On 23 April 2022, the Vancouver ePrix was cancelled by the race organizers. On 11 May 2022, the Marrakesh ePrix was announced in its place for the same 2 July date slot.

Round	ePrix	Country	Circuit	Date
1	Diriyah ePrix	Saudi Arabia	Riyadh Street Circuit	28 January 2022
2	Diriyah ePrix	Saudi Arabia	Riyadh Street Circuit	29 January 2022
3	Mexico City ePrix	Mexico	Autódromo Hermanos Rodríguez	12 February 2022
4	Rome ePrix	Italy	Circuito Cittadino dell'EUR	9 April 2022
5	Rome ePrix	Italy	Circuito Cittadino dell'EUR	10 April 2022
6	Monaco ePrix	Monaco	Circuit de Monaco	30 April 2022
7	Berlin ePrix I	Germany	Tempelhof Airport Street Circuit (Note: Round 8 used a reversed track layout from round 7.)	14 May 2022
8	Berlin ePrix II	Germany	Tempelhof Airport Street Circuit	15 May 2022
9	Jakarta ePrix	Indonesia	Jakarta International e-Prix Circuit	4 June 2022
10	Marrakesh ePrix	Morocco	Circuit International Automobile Moulay El Hassan	2 July 2022
11	New York City ePrix	United States	Brooklyn Street Circuit	16 July 2022
12	New York City ePrix	United States	Brooklyn Street Circuit	17 July 2022
13	London ePrix	United Kingdom	ExCeL London	30 July 2022
14	London ePrix	United Kingdom	ExCeL London	31 July 2022
15	Seoul ePrix	South Korea	Seoul Street Circuit	13 August 2022
16	Seoul ePrix	South Korea	Seoul Street Circuit	14 August 2022

=== ePrix locations ===
Location of ePrix in 2022.
(ePrix - Single Race)
(ePrix - Double Header)

== Regulation changes ==
=== Qualifying format ===
A new qualifying format was introduced, where the drivers were split into two groups based on their position in the championship, those in odd-numbered places went into group A, whilst those in even-numbered places went into group B. The exception was in the first race of the season, where each team could nominate one driver into each group. Each group got a 10-minute session to set a fastest lap at 220 kW, of which the top 4 of each group advanced to the duels stage, where drivers face off head-to-head at 250 kW over a quarter-final, semi-final and final. The winner of the final then lined up in position 1, the loser of the final in position 2, the losers of the semi-final in positions 3 and 4, and the losers of the quarter-final in positions 5 through 8, in order of time set in their respective sessions. The rest of the drivers from the group stage then formed alternately from position 9, with the polesitter's group in the odd places, and the other group in the even places.

== Season report ==
=== Opening rounds ===
For the fourth time, the championship kicked off at the Riyadh Street Circuit in Diriyah. Stoffel Vandoorne took pole position and led from the start, as António Félix da Costa retired in a four-way fight through the first corner of the race. Vandoorne controlled the first half of the race, surviving a safety car and the subsequent restart as Oliver Rowland was pushed into the wall in turn 16 ten minutes into the race. When he attempted to activate his second attack mode, he missed the sensors and was overtaken by his teammate Nyck de Vries, who started third and overtook Jake Dennis at the start. The latter was then also overtaken by André Lotterer, but managed to get by him again to keep a podium position. De Vries remained largely unchallenged in the second half of the race and led Vandoorne home in a Mercedes 1–2. Rookie Oliver Askew ended his debut race in eighth place and scored four points.

The second part of the Diriyah double-header again saw a Mercedes take pole, this time it was de Vries. He held the lead during the early stages of the race, but was later passed by Lucas di Grassi around the outside in turn 18, with the latter's team-mate Edoardo Mortara also coming through one lap later. Mortara was then able to also overtake di Grassi, as de Vries lost his momentum and slid down the order, eventually ending up in tenth. Robin Frijns passed di Grassi for second with ten minutes remaining, but a battle for the lead was disrupted as a safety car was called to recover Alexander Sims, who lost control of his Mahindra through turn 5. A relatively slow recovery meant the race ended under yellow flag conditions. Mortara left Diriyah leading the standings, four points ahead of de Vries.

Two weeks later, Formula E returned to the Autódromo Hermanos Rodríguez in Mexico City. Pascal Wehrlein put his Porsche on pole and covered Mortara at the start of the race. He was then overtaken by Mortara after he took his first attack mode, and later also by Jean-Éric Vergne, who passed both Porsches in two laps. After the second round of attack modes, the Porsche pair in third and fourth had the most energy remaining and capitalized on that: both overtook Vergne on lap 25 and two laps later Wehrlein regained the race lead, with his teammate Lotterer in second place. Mortara dropped back behind both Techeetahs, as Porsche used team orders to seal their 1-2 finish. Wehrlein's win promoted him to third in the standings, behind de Vries and Mortara.

A one-month break followed before the next round at the Circuito Cittadino dell'EUR in Rome. Mercedes seemed to be back on form, with Vandoorne taking pole and de Vries third on the grid. Vandoorne held the lead from Frijns, as both Rowland and Maximilian Günther hit the barriers on the first lap, bringing out a safety car. Frijns and Vandoorne continued to battle for the lead, overtaking each other multiple times as both used their attack mode activations, while de Vries was forced to retire with a technical issue. Mitch Evans, who started ninth, had made his way up past six cars and overtook both leaders to claim first place. Frijns dropped back to fourth, but overtook both Vergne and Vandoorne in the last two minutes of the race to regain second place.

The double-header in Rome continued with Vergne claiming his 14th pole position. He pulled away from the start, while Dennis started dropping back behind him, allowing Lotterer and Evans through. Championship leader Mortara had to retire after clipping the wall and ruining his suspension. The safety car was then deployed as Antonio Giovinazzi's car stopped on track, with Evans capitalizing on his Jaguar's speed on the restart and overtaking Vergne for the lead. He was then overtaken by Frijns and Lotterer, who both led for short stints, before a second safety car was brought out for the retired Sims. Evans took his attack mode late in the race and managed to regain the lead, holding onto it until the end to seal a double win in Rome, ahead of Vergne and Frijns. Vergne took the championship lead after Rome, albeit only by two points, while de Vries' pointless weekend saw him slipping back.

=== Mid-season rounds ===
The sixth round of the season was held on the historic Circuit de Monaco. Evans built upon his recent form, dominating qualifying and sealing pole position. He led away from Wehrlein and Vergne, controlling the pace in the early stages. Wehrlein passed Evans as the latter took his attack mode, but had to defend from Vergne and sustained damage to his car, forcing him to retire and bringing out a full course yellow. This hurt race leader Vergne, who had just taken his attack mode, and allowed Vandoorne and Evans to pull away in first and second place. Vandoorne befell the same bad luck, as shortly after his second attack mode activation, a safety car was called to recover Lotterer's Porsche at Sainte Devote. Vandoorne managed to control the restart and led until the chequered flag, ahead of Evans and Vergne. This promoted him to the championship lead, six points clear of Vergne.

The championship went to Berlin next, setting up camp at Tempelhof Airport Street Circuit. The first half of the double-header, held on the traditional layout, began with Mortara claiming his maiden pole position. He held position at the start, while championship leader Vandoorne dropped down to twelfth. Mortara controlled the race, only dropping back to second for half a lap after picking up his attack mode. Behind him, multiple drivers fought for the podium positions, including a resurging Vandoorne. Mortara dropped behind Vandoorne and Lotterer for his second attack mode, but once again he retook the lead shortly after. Vergne had overtaken Lotterer and Vandoorne for second, but an attack on Mortara didn't work out. Mortara was then able to draw out a gap and win in front of Vergne and Vandoorne.

For the second race in Berlin, the reverse track layout was used, but that didn't stop Mortara getting pole once again. At the race start however, it was de Vries who shone, getting away brilliantly from third and making quick work of Frijns in second and Mortara in first. Like Mortara the day before, de Vries lost the lead to take attack mode, but got back into first place quickly. Mortara, who had briefly dropped to fourth, overtook Vandoorne and then da Costa to slot back into second place. The top ten mostly sat as they were for the last part of the race, de Vries from Mortara, di Grassi and Vandoorne. At the end, di Grassi had to save energy, allowing Vandoorne to take his second third place in a row. This meant he solidified his championship lead, now twelve points ahead of Mortara and 16 ahead of Vergne.

Next up was the inaugural Jakarta ePrix, held on the streets around the Ancol area. Vergne claimed his 15th pole position, a new record, and led his teammate da Costa at the start, with Evans in third. A safety car was deployed after only a lap to recover Rowland's car, and Evans took second place at the restart when da Costa made a mistake at turn 7. The leading pair remained the same after the first attack mode activation, while Mortara used the boost to gain third place. Vergne used fanboost and attack mode to draw out a gap to Evans, who managed to keep second place through his second attack mode and set off after Vergne. On lap 31, Evans caught Vergne unaware and made his move into turn 7, to gain a lead he didn't relinquish again. Mortara came third, having closed up to the pair in the final stages of the race. Vandoorne's fifth place meant the standings closed up: his lead was now only five points ahead of Vergne, with the top four within twelve points.

The cancelled Vancouver ePrix was replaced by a scorching hot Marrakesh, with da Costa claiming pole around the Circuit International Automobile Moulay El Hassan, while championship leader Vandoorne struggled with brake problems and only managed 20th on the grid. In the race, the lead trio of both Techeetahs and Mortara were unchallenged at the start. Mortara took the lead from da Costa after the first round of attack modes, while Rowland was on a mission through both attack modes, overtaking four cars to slot into second place, behind Mortara. The two Techeetahs later flew back by Rowland, who then dropped back into the field. They took turns attacking Mortara in the final stages of the race, but no one managed to overtake him. Mortara held on to his third win of the season, ahead of da Costa and Evans, who snuck by Vergne on the final lap. Vandoorne crucially managed an eighth-place finish, but Mortara now led the standings by eleven points.

=== Closing rounds ===
New York City welcomed the teams and drivers with fickle weather conditions around the Brooklyn Street Circuit. Nick Cassidy took pole position, after rain hit during group B running. The race began in dry conditions, with Cassidy defending from Vandoorne, while title contender Vergne had a spin during the opening lap. Cassidy managed to regain his lead after losing it to di Grassi during the first round of attack mode, and continued to lead the pack. Vandoorne, who had momentarily dropped back to fifth, climbed back up the order, eventually rising up to second place. This was short-lived, however, as di Grassi quickly retook that position, also allowing Frijns to gain third place. With ten minutes left, heavy rain hit the circuit. The leaders hit the wet parts first and Cassidy, di Grassi and Vandoorne all slid off into the barriers at turn 6. A red flag was thrown, and after a restart was ruled out, Cassidy was awarded his maiden win on countback, ahead of di Grassi and Frijns.

Cassidy was fastest once again in qualifying for the second New York City ePrix, but received a hefty penalty following the repairs after his crash the day before. Da Costa inherited pole and was unchallenged at the start, leading Sims and Vandoorne, while Lotterer stalled on the grid. After the leading group all took their single attack mode, the top six remained unchallenged, before Vandoorne took second place from Sims. The latter was then also overtaken by Evans, who slot into third. Da Costa remained on top, bringing home a first win of the season both for him and for his team. Vandoorne's second place meant he overtook Mortara for the championship lead, eleven points now splitting the pair, as the latter had a horrible day, being forced to start at the back and only managing tenth place.

The penultimate location of the championship was the ExCeL exhibition centre in London. Dennis took pole on home soil, immediately having to defend from Vandoorne at the start. He prevailed, while Sam Bird and Mortara collided, the former retiring and the latter having to pit and dropping to the back. Sérgio Sette Câmara was the big surprise in the early stages of the race, overtaking de Vries for third place. He fell away later in the race, though, as de Vries got back by. Dennis remained first until the end, winning on home soil like last season, with Vandoorne coming home second and de Vries in third on the road, though he got a penalty after the race, promoting Cassidy to the podium.

No one seemed to be able to stop Dennis in London, as the Englishman took his second pole around the ExCeL. He led di Grassi and Giovinazzi at the start, while Askew had to retire after contact with Rowland during the first lap. Vergne ended his race - and pretty much his title challenge - after contact, bringing out the safety car. During the first round of attack mode, de Vries was able to get past Giovinazzi for third, the latter then having to serve a drive-through penalty for overpower. Da Costa was shortly able to gain third place, but de Vries soon retook the place. Di Grassi started pressuring Dennis in the later stages of the race, gaining the lead through the final attack mode activation and Dennis unable to re-pass him. Evans had to retire with a technical problem and Mortara finished in 13th. This, together with Vandoorne finishing fourth, meant he now had a 36-point lead heading into the season finale.

Seoul was the host of said finale, with a circuit around the olympic village and through the olympic stadium. Inclement weather was forecast for the whole weekend, and the first qualifying session was very wet throughout. Rowland mastered the conditions to take pole. The race started in damp conditions, and Evans had the perfect start, shooting from third up into the lead. An eight-car pileup into a wet penultimate corner caused a red flag, with Evans continuing to lead through the restart, from Rowland and di Grassi. Mortara's championship challenge came to an end as he retired with a puncture on lap 20. Evans was largely unchallenged through the rest of the race, with a full course yellow at the end to recover Sims' car cutting short any action. Evans' win meant the championship went down to the wire at the last race, even though a 21-point lead looked all but impossible to overcome.

Da Costa ended the last qualifying of the Gen2 era on pole, holding the lead on a now dry track. Mortara overtook him on lap 3, with Dennis following him through. Vandoorne sat comfortably in fourth, more than enough to seal the title. After a safety car was brought out to recover Günther's car, da Costa tried to make a move on Dennis for third, with the latter spinning the former around and then sustaining a penalty for the contact. This meant Vandoorne got second place over the line, with Dennis slipping back to third. Vandoorne took a deserved world championship, only winning once but being the most consistent among his rivals, scoring points in 15 of the 16 races. Mercedes ended the second generation of the championship and their Formula E commitment with back-to-back driver and team championships.

== Results and standings ==
=== ePrix ===
Round	Race	Pole position	Fastest lap	Winning driver	Winning team	Report
1	(Saudi Arabia) Diriyah	(Belgium) Stoffel Vandoorne	(New Zealand) Nick Cassidy	(Netherlands) Nyck de Vries	(Germany) Mercedes-EQ Formula E Team	Report
2	(Saudi Arabia) Diriyah	(Netherlands) Nyck de Vries	(United Kingdom) Sam Bird (Note: Sam Bird set the fastest lap, but did not finish in the top 10, so was ineligible to be the point-scorer for the fastest lap. Stoffel Vandoorne was the point-scorer instead for setting the fastest lap of those finishing in the top 10.)	(Switzerland) Edoardo Mortara	(Monaco) ROKiT Venturi Racing	Report
3	Mexico City	(Germany) Pascal Wehrlein	(Brazil) Lucas di Grassi (Note: Lucas di Grassi set the fastest lap, but did not finish in the top 10, so was ineligible to be the point-scorer for the fastest lap. Nyck de Vries was the point-scorer instead for setting the fastest lap of those finishing in the top 10.)	(Germany) Pascal Wehrlein	(Germany) TAG Heuer Porsche Formula E Team	Report
4	(Italy) Rome	(Belgium) Stoffel Vandoorne	(Brazil) Lucas di Grassi (Note: Lucas di Grassi set the fastest lap, but did not finish in the top 10, so was ineligible to be the point-scorer for the fastest lap. Nick Cassidy was the point-scorer instead for setting the fastest lap of those finishing in the top 10.)	(New Zealand) Mitch Evans	(United Kingdom) Jaguar TCS Racing	Report
5	(Italy) Rome	(France) Jean-Éric Vergne	(Netherlands) Robin Frijns	(New Zealand) Mitch Evans	(United Kingdom) Jaguar TCS Racing	Report
6	Monaco	(New Zealand) Mitch Evans	(Netherlands) Robin Frijns	(Belgium) Stoffel Vandoorne	(Germany) Mercedes-EQ Formula E Team	Report
7	(Germany) Berlin I	(Switzerland) Edoardo Mortara	(Brazil) Lucas di Grassi (Note: Lucas di Grassi set the fastest lap, but did not finish in the top 10, so was ineligible to be the point-scorer for the fastest lap. Pascal Wehrlein was the point-scorer instead for setting the fastest lap of those finishing in the top 10.)	(Switzerland) Edoardo Mortara	(Monaco) ROKiT Venturi Racing	Report
8	(Germany) Berlin II	(Switzerland) Edoardo Mortara	(New Zealand) Nick Cassidy (Note: Nick Cassidy set the fastest lap, but did not finish in the top 10, so was ineligible to be the point-scorer for the fastest lap. Edoardo Mortara was the point-scorer instead for setting the fastest lap of those finishing in the top 10.)	(Netherlands) Nyck de Vries	(Germany) Mercedes-EQ Formula E Team	Report
9	(Indonesia) Jakarta	(France) Jean-Éric Vergne	(New Zealand) Mitch Evans	(New Zealand) Mitch Evans	(United Kingdom) Jaguar TCS Racing	Report
10	(Morocco) Marrakesh	(Portugal) António Félix da Costa	(Brazil) Lucas di Grassi	(Switzerland) Edoardo Mortara	(Monaco) ROKiT Venturi Racing	Report
11	(United States) New York City	(New Zealand) Nick Cassidy	(Switzerland) Edoardo Mortara	(New Zealand) Nick Cassidy	(United Kingdom) Envision Racing	Report
12	(United States) New York City	(New Zealand) Nick Cassidy (Note: Nick Cassidy set the fastest time and received three points for pole position and the award, but had a 30-place grid penalty for using his fifth RESS radiator. Therefore, he started from last place while António Félix da Costa started from pole position.)	(Switzerland) Edoardo Mortara	(Portugal) António Félix da Costa	(France) DS Techeetah	Report
13	(United Kingdom) London	(United Kingdom) Jake Dennis	(United Kingdom) Jake Dennis	(United Kingdom) Jake Dennis	(United States) Avalanche Andretti Formula E	Report
14	(United Kingdom) London	(United Kingdom) Jake Dennis	(New Zealand) Nick Cassidy (Note: Nick Cassidy set the fastest lap, but did not finish in the top 10, so was ineligible to be the point-scorer for the fastest lap. Jake Dennis was the point-scorer instead for setting the fastest lap of those finishing in the top 10.)	(Brazil) Lucas di Grassi	(Monaco) ROKiT Venturi Racing	Report
15	(South Korea) Seoul	(United Kingdom) Oliver Rowland	(United Kingdom) Jake Dennis	(New Zealand) Mitch Evans	(United Kingdom) Jaguar TCS Racing	Report
16	(South Korea) Seoul	(Portugal) António Félix da Costa	(New Zealand) Nick Cassidy	(Switzerland) Edoardo Mortara	(Monaco) ROKiT Venturi Racing	Report

=== Drivers' Championship ===
Points were awarded using the following structure:

Position	1st	2nd	3rd	4th	5th	6th	7th	8th	9th	10th	Pole	FL
Points	25	18	15	12	10	8	6	4	2	1	3	1

Pos.	Driver	DRH (Saudi Arabia)		MEX (Mexico)	RME (Italy)		MCO (Monaco)	BER (Germany)		JAK (Indonesia)	MRK (Morocco)	NYC (United States)		LDN (United Kingdom)		SEO (South Korea)		Pts
1	(Belgium) Stoffel Vandoorne	**2***	7*	11*	**3***	5*	1*	3*	3*	5*	8*	4*	2*	2*	4*	5*	2*	213
2	(New Zealand) Mitch Evans	10*	21	19	1	1	**2**	5*	10	1*	3	11	3	5*	Ret*	1*	7*	180
3	(Switzerland) Edoardo Mortara	6	1	5	7	Ret	Ret	**1**	**2**	3	1*	9*	10*	18*	13*	Ret*	1*	169
4	(France) Jean-Éric Vergne	8	6*	3	4*	**2***	3*	2*	9*	**2***	4*	18*	Ret*	14	Ret*	6	6	144
5	(Brazil) Lucas di Grassi	5	3	12*	11	8	6	Ret	4	7	5*	2*	Ret	9*	1*	3*	11*	126
6	(United Kingdom) Jake Dennis	3	5	10	13	Ret	9	13	13	6	7	10	8	**1**	**2**	4	3	126
7	(Netherlands) Robin Frijns	16	2	7	2	3	4	12	5	17	18	3	6	16	7	8	4	126
8	(Portugal) António Félix da Costa	Ret*	12*	4*	6*	13*	5*	8*	6*	4*	**2***	Ret*	1*	7*	5	9*	**10***	122
9	(Netherlands) Nyck de Vries	1*	**10***	6*	Ret*	14	10*	10*	1*	Ret*	6	8	7*	6	3	Ret	Ret	106
10	(Germany) Pascal Wehrlein	11	9	**1**	8	6	Ret	6	12	8	12	6	11	10	10	7	Ret	71
11	(New Zealand) Nick Cassidy	7	16	13	9	Ret	7	Ret	21	16	13	**1**	**15**	3	Ret	10	8	68
12	(Germany) André Lotterer	13	4	2	10	4	Ret	4	8*	9	15	16	9	12	12	Ret	Ret	63
13	(United Kingdom) Sam Bird	4	15	15	5	Ret	Ret	7	11	10	9	7	5	Ret	8			51
14	(United Kingdom) Oliver Rowland	Ret	8	16	Ret	Ret*	Ret	11	7	Ret	10	13	14	Ret	Ret	**2**	Ret	32
15	(Switzerland) Sébastien Buemi	17	13	8	16	9	8	14	14	11	16	5	13	11	6	Ret	9	30
16	(United States) Oliver Askew	9	11	17	14	15	15	15	15	13	11	19	Ret	4	Ret	Ret	5	24
17	(United Kingdom) Alexander Sims	14	Ret	Ret	12	Ret	11	9	18	15	14	14	4	13	11	Ret	12	14
18	(United Kingdom) Oliver Turvey	19	18	14	17	7	14	16	17	12	17	15	16	15	14	Ret	15	6
19	(Germany) Maximilian Günther	12	14	9	Ret	11	17	18	16	14	Ret	12	DSQ	8	15	11	Ret	6
20	(Brazil) Sérgio Sette Câmara	15	17	20	15	12	13	17	19	19	20	DNS	17	NC	9	12	13	2
21	(United Kingdom) Dan Ticktum	18	19	18	18	10	12	19	20	18	Ret	17	12	17	Ret	Ret	Ret	1
22	(France) Norman Nato															13	14	0
23	(Italy) Antonio Giovinazzi	20*	20*	Ret*	19*	Ret*	16*	20	22	Ret	19	Ret	Ret	Ret	Ret	Ret	WD	0
24	(France) Sacha Fenestraz																16	0
Pos.	Driver	DRH (Saudi Arabia)		MEX (Mexico)	RME (Italy)		MCO (Monaco)	BER (Germany)		JAK (Indonesia)	MRK (Morocco)	NYC (United States)		LDN (United Kingdom)		SEO (South Korea)		Pts

Colour	Result
Gold	Winner
Silver	Second place
Bronze	Third place
Green	Points classification
Blue	Non-points classification
Blue	Non-classified finish (NC)
Purple	Retired, not classified (Ret)
Red	Did not qualify (DNQ)
Red	Did not pre-qualify (DNPQ)
Black	Disqualified (DSQ)
White	Did not start (DNS)
White	Withdrew (WD)
White	Race cancelled (C)
Blank	Did not practice (DNP)
Blank	Did not arrive (DNA)
Blank	Excluded (EX)

**Bold** – Pole

Italics – Fastest lap

* – FanBoost

=== Teams' Championship ===
Pos.	Team	No.	DRH (Saudi Arabia)		MEX (Mexico)	RME (Italy)		MCO (Monaco)	BER (Germany)		JAK (Indonesia)	MRK (Morocco)	NYC (United States)		LDN (United Kingdom)		SEO (South Korea)		Pts
1	(Germany) Mercedes-EQ Formula E Team	5	**2**	7	11	**3**	5	1	3	3	5	8	4	2	2	4	5	2	319
1	(Germany) Mercedes-EQ Formula E Team	17	1	**10**	6	Ret	14	10	10	1	Ret	6	8	7	6	3	Ret	Ret	319
2	(Monaco) ROKiT Venturi Racing	11	5	3	12	11	8	6	Ret	4	7	5	2	Ret	9	1	3	11	295
2	(Monaco) ROKiT Venturi Racing	48	6	1	5	7	Ret	Ret	**1**	**2**	3	1	9	10	18	13	Ret	1	295
3	(France) DS Techeetah	13	Ret	12	4	6	13	5	8	6	4	**2**	Ret	1	7	5	9	**10**	266
3	(France) DS Techeetah	25	8	6	3	4	**2**	3	2	9	**2**	4	18	Ret	14	Ret	6	6	266
4	(United Kingdom) Jaguar TCS Racing	9	10	21	19	1	1	**2**	5	10	1	3	11	3	5	Ret	1	7	231
4	(United Kingdom) Jaguar TCS Racing	10	4	15	15	5	Ret	Ret	7	11	10	9	7	5	Ret	8	13	14	231
5	(United Kingdom) Envision Racing	4	16	2	7	2	3	4	12	5	17	18	3	6	16	7	8	4	194
5	(United Kingdom) Envision Racing	37	7	16	13	9	Ret	7	Ret	21	16	13	**1**	**15**	3	Ret	10	8	194
6	(United States) Avalanche Andretti Formula E	27	3	5	10	13	Ret	9	13	13	6	7	10	8	**1**	**2**	4	3	150
6	(United States) Avalanche Andretti Formula E	28	9	11	17	14	15	15	15	15	13	11	19	Ret	4	Ret	Ret	5	150
7	(Germany) TAG Heuer Porsche Formula E Team	36	13	4	2	10	4	Ret	4	8	9	15	16	9	12	12	Ret	Ret	134
7	(Germany) TAG Heuer Porsche Formula E Team	94	11	9	**1**	8	6	Ret	6	12	8	12	6	11	10	10	7	Ret	134
8	(India) Mahindra Racing	29	14	Ret	Ret	12	Ret	11	9	18	15	14	14	4	13	11	Ret	12	46
8	(India) Mahindra Racing	30	Ret	8	16	Ret	Ret	Ret	11	7	Ret	10	13	14	Ret	Ret	**2**	Ret	46
9	(France) Nissan e.dams	22	12	14	9	Ret	11	17	18	16	14	Ret	12	DSQ	8	15	11	Ret	36
9	(France) Nissan e.dams	23	17	13	8	16	9	8	14	14	11	16	5	13	11	6	Ret	9	36
10	(China) NIO 333 Formula E Team	3	19	18	14	17	7	14	16	17	12	17	15	16	15	14	Ret	15	7
10	(China) NIO 333 Formula E Team	33	18	19	18	18	10	12	19	20	18	Ret	17	12	17	Ret	Ret	Ret	7
11	(United States) Dragon / Penske Autosport	7	15	17	20	15	12	13	17	19	19	20	DNS	17	NC	9	12	13	2
11	(United States) Dragon / Penske Autosport	99	20	20	Ret	19	Ret	16	20	22	Ret	19	Ret	Ret	Ret	Ret	Ret	16	2
Pos.	Team	No.	DRH (Saudi Arabia)		MEX (Mexico)	RME (Italy)		MCO (Monaco)	BER (Germany)		JAK (Indonesia)	MRK (Morocco)	NYC (United States)		LDN (United Kingdom)		SEO (South Korea)		Pts
