= Scream Or Dance =

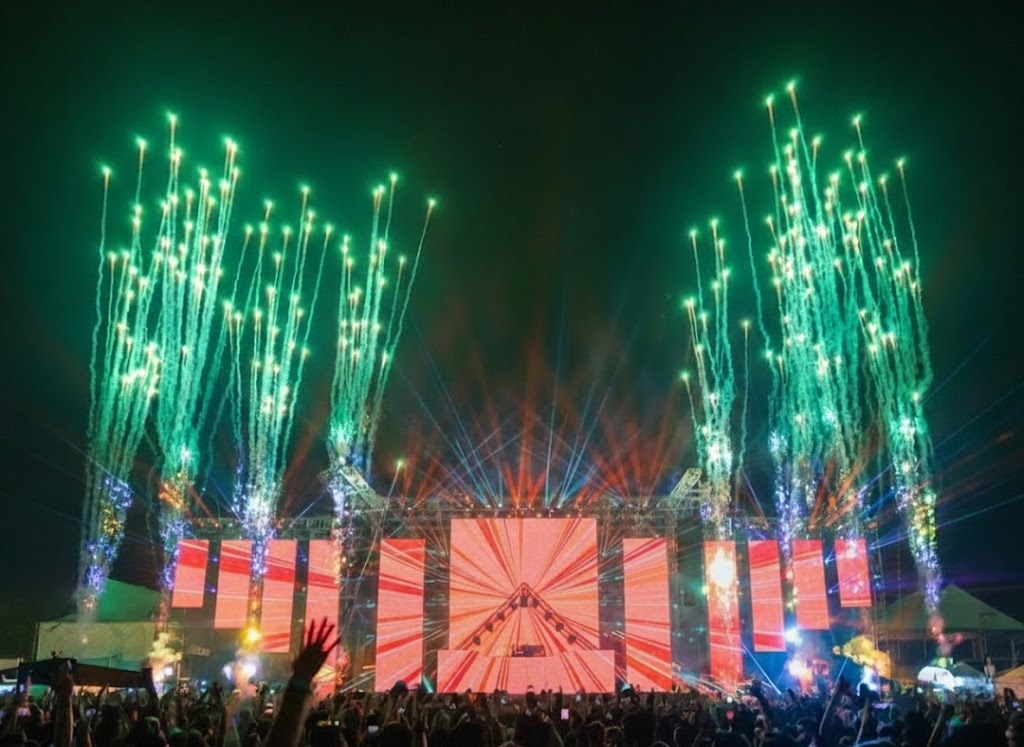
- Scream Or Dance mainstage (in 2023 edition)
- Status: Active
- Genre: Electronic dance music, pop, indie, Halloween festival
- Date: Late October to Early November Weekend
- Frequency: Annually
- Location: Ancol Beach City International Stadium, North Jakarta (2022, 2025); Phantom PIK 2, North Jakarta (2023); Carnaval Ancol, North Jakarta, (2024)
- Years active: 2022–Present
- Inaugurated: 2022
- Founder: Shaheen Alkubaysi
- Most recent: October 31th – November 1st, 2025 (Forbidden Wonderland)
- Next event: Late October - Early November Weekend 2026
- Attendance: (not officially published)
- Capacity: depending on venue
- Major events: Electronic Music Dance Party
- Organiser: Shafari Live, Prestige Promotions, Rumah Minum
- Member: Rumah Minum
- Website: screamordance.com

Scream Or Dance (often abbreviated as SOD) is an annual Halloween-themed electronic dance music festival held in Jakarta, Indonesia. The festival combines DJ performances, immersive horror attractions, theatrical installations, and cosplay culture, creating a hybrid Halloween–music festival experience. It is currently considered as the biggest annual Halloween electronic music festival in the country, and also considered as one of the largest annual Halloween music festivals in South East Asia.

== History ==
=== Origins (2022) ===
The inaugural edition of Scream Or Dance was held on 28–29 October 2022 at Ancol Beach City International Stadium, North Jakarta. The event featured horror installations including a haunted house, wax museum, “crow house”, food bazaar, and themed interactive zones.

The Festival founder Shaheen Alkubaysi described SOD as a creative space where young people could freely express themselves through costume, performance, and dance.

=== 2023: The Lost Pyramids ===
The 2023 edition was held on 27–28 October 2023 at Phantom PIK 2 with the theme "The Lost Pyramids".

=== 2024: The Undiscovered Universe ===
The 2024 edition adopted the theme "The Undiscovered Universe" and returned to Carnaval Ancol, North Jakarta incorporating sci-fi and cosmic-horror visual elements.

This edition featured:

- Multiple festival stages across the Carnaval beachfront area.
- An extravagant lasershow through a Massive Mainstage edition.
- An audience turnout expected to reach several thousand attendees per day.

The 2024 edition was officially sponsored by VIBE.

=== 2025: Forbidden Wonderland ===
The 2025 edition returned to Ancol Beach City International Stadium, taking place on 31 October – 1 November 2025 under the theme "Forbidden Wonderland".

This edition featured:

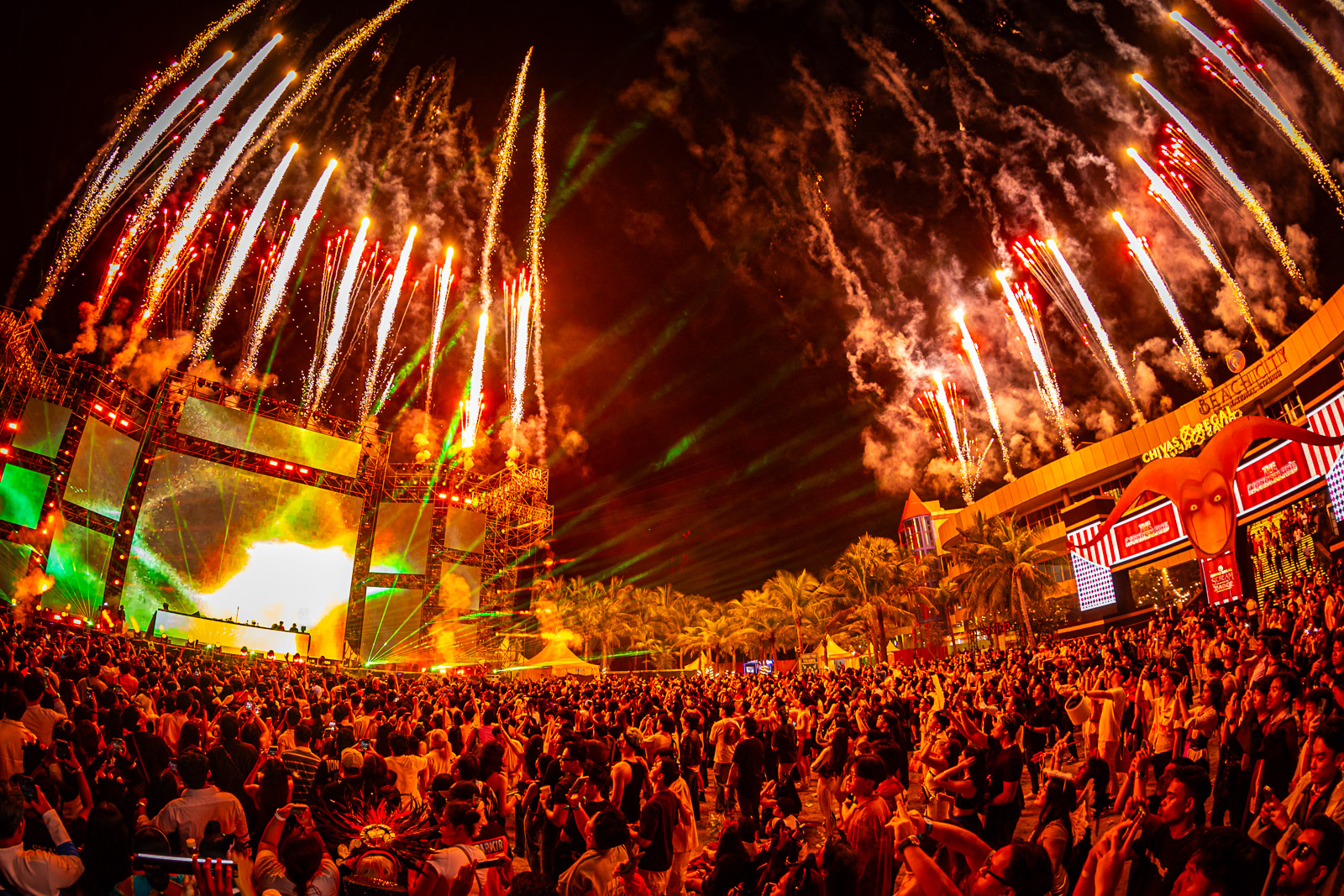
Scream or Dance mainstage 2025

- Five themed stages: The Wonderland, Inferno Cage, Hatchi Area, Red Misfit Arena, and 999
- Large-scale cosplay & costume parade
- A projected target attendance of 10,000 per day

2025 also included major sponsorship from Chivas Regal.

== Incident ==
=== 2022 Police Shut Down ===
The inaugural edition (Vol. 1) was originally scheduled as a two-day event, but the festival ultimately took place only on 28 October 2022. According to contemporaneous reports and later recollections, local police intervened and attempted to shut down the event. However, definitive public documentation explaining the intervention has not been located and the precise reason for the early termination remains unclear, with permit issues frequently cited as a possible cause.

== Concept and Production ==
Scream Or Dance is known for integrating theatrical horror design with electronic dance music, setting it apart from conventional EDM festivals. Each edition includes scare zones, horror mazes, artistic installations, and interactive characters.

The festival emphasizes creative freedom and encourages attendees to participate in full Halloween or fantasy costumes, contributing to its immersive identity.

== Reception ==
Scream Or Dance has been covered widely by Indonesian media and is recognized as one of the largest Halloween music festivals in the country.

Its 2025 edition particularly drew attention for attracting large youth audiences, extensive cosplay participation, and multi-stage expansion.

== See also ==
- Electronic dance music festivals
- Music festivals
- Halloween
