= 2023 Jakarta ePrix =

Race 10 of 16 of the 2022–23 Formula E season
← Previous race	Next race →
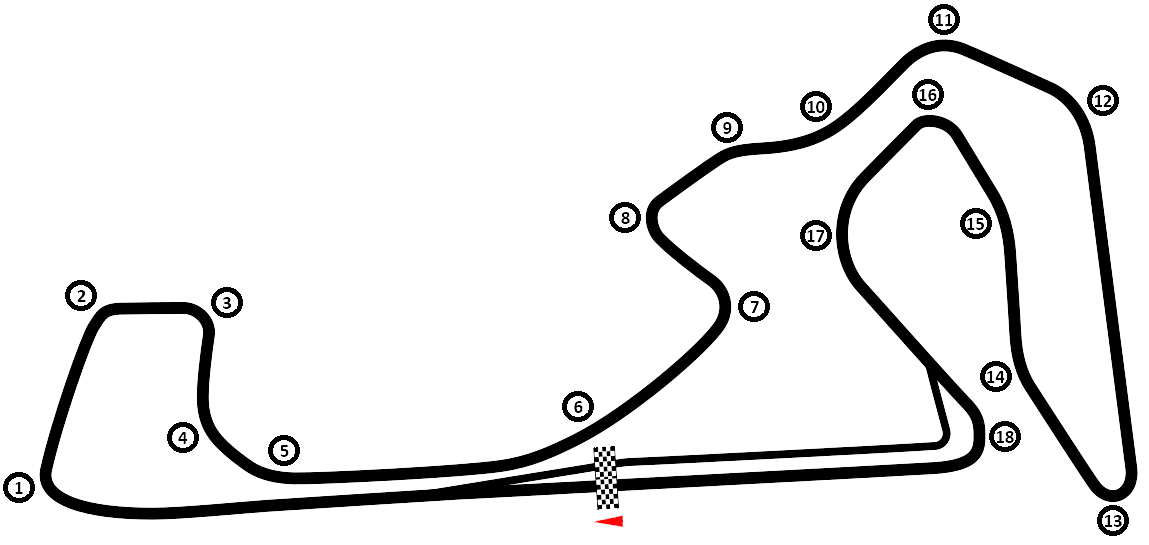

Race details
- Date: 3 June 2023
- Official name: 2023 Gulavit Jakarta E-Prix
- Location: Jakarta International e-Prix Circuit, Ancol, Jakarta, Indonesia
- Course: Street circuit
- Course length: 2.370 km (1.473 mi)
- Distance: 36 laps, 85.320 km (53.015 mi)

Pole position
Driver	(Germany) Maximilian Günther	Maserati
- Time: 1:08.141

Fastest lap
Driver	(Switzerland) Sébastien Buemi	Envision-Jaguar
- Time: 1:09.755 on lap 35

Podium
First	(Germany) Pascal Wehrlein	Porsche
Second	(United Kingdom) Jake Dennis	Andretti-Porsche
Third	(Germany) Maximilian Günther	Maserati

2023 Jakarta ePrix
Race 11 of 16 of the 2022–23 Formula E season
← Previous race	Next race →
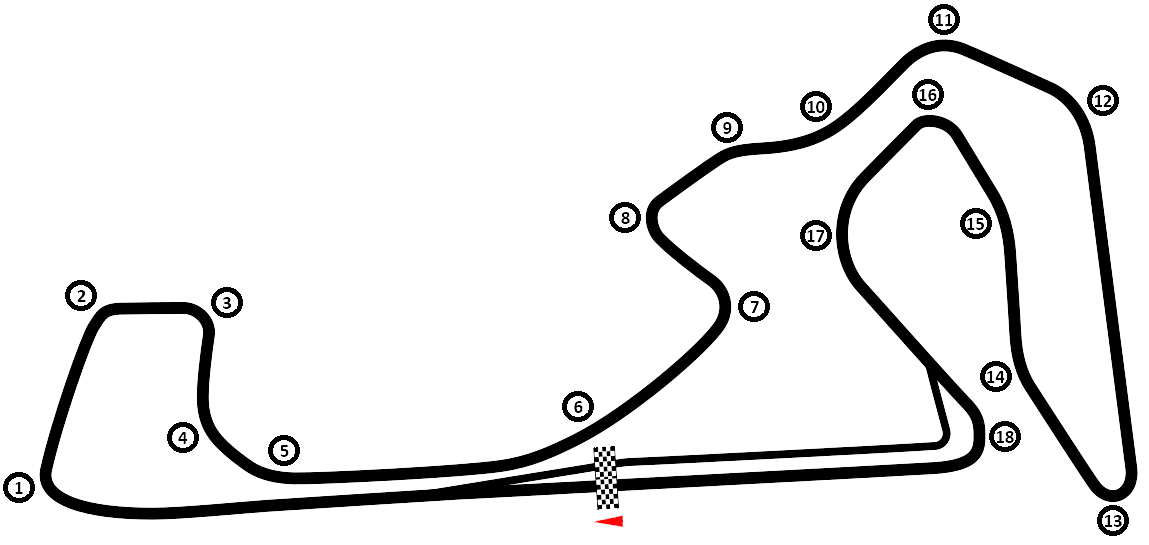

Race details
- Date: 4 June 2023
- Official name: 2023 Gulavit Jakarta E-Prix
- Location: Jakarta International e-Prix Circuit, Ancol, Jakarta, Indonesia
- Course: Street circuit
- Course length: 2.370 km (1.473 mi)
- Distance: 38 laps, 90.060 km (55.961 mi)

Pole position
Driver	(Germany) Maximilian Günther	Maserati
- Time: 1:07.753

Fastest lap
Driver	(United Kingdom) Jake Dennis	Andretti-Porsche
- Time: 1:09.171 on lap 33

Podium
First	(Germany) Maximilian Günther	Maserati
Second	(United Kingdom) Jake Dennis	Andretti-Porsche
Third	(New Zealand) Mitch Evans	Jaguar

The 2023 Jakarta ePrix, known for sponsorship reasons as the 2023 Gulavit Jakarta E-Prix was a pair of Formula E electric car races held at the Jakarta International e-Prix Circuit in Ancol, northern Jakarta on 3 and 4 June 2023. They served as the 10th and 11th rounds of the 2022-23 Formula E season and the second running of the Jakarta ePrix. The first race was won by Pascal Wehrlein for Porsche, with Jake Dennis and Maximilian Günther in second and third place respectively. The second race was won by Maximilian Günther for Maserati's maiden Formula E victory, with Jake Dennis and Mitch Evans completing the podium.

== Background ==
Following his win at Monaco, Nick Cassidy took the lead of the driver's championship from Pascal Wehrlein with a 20 point gap between the two. Jake Dennis enters the tenth round in 3rd, overtaking Jean-Éric Vergne, 25 points behind Cassidy.

=== Driver changes ===
Due to the 24 Hours of Le Mans test day, André Lotterer missed the Jakarta ePrix, being replaced by David Beckmann, Formula Two and Porsche reserve driver, making his Formula E debut.

On 28 May, Mahindra Racing announced that Oliver Rowland would leave the team with immediate effect. Former Formula One driver Roberto Merhi was announced as his replacement, also making his debut in the series.

== Classification ==
(All times are in WIB)

=== Race 1 ===
==== Qualifying ====
Qualifying for race 1 took place at 10:40 AM on 3 June.

Group draw
Group A	(New Zealand) CAS	(United Kingdom) DEN	(France) JEV	(United Kingdom) BIR	(United Kingdom) HUG	(Belgium) VAN	(France) FEN	(United Kingdom) TIC	(Brazil) SET	(Netherlands) FRI	(Spain) MER
Group B	(Germany) WEH	(New Zealand) EVA	(Portugal) DAC	(Switzerland) BUE	(Germany) RAS	(Germany) GUE	(Brazil) DIG	(France) NAT	(Switzerland) MOR	(Switzerland) MUE	(Germany) BEC

Qualifying 1 duels

Quarter-finals
A3	(France) Jean-Éric Vergne
A2	(Belgium) Stoffel Vandoorne
A1	(United Kingdom) Jake Dennis
A4	(Netherlands) Robin Frijns
B3	(Germany) Rene Rast
B2	(Germany) Pascal Wehrlein
B4	(Switzerland) Edoardo Mortara
B1	(Germany) Maximilian Günther

Semi-finals
(France) Jean-Éric Vergne
(United Kingdom) Jake Dennis
(Germany) Pascal Wehrlein
(Germany) Maximilian Günther

Final
(United Kingdom) Jake Dennis
(Germany) Maximilian Günther

Overall Classification

Pos.	No.	Driver	Team	A	B	QF	SF	F	Grid
1	7	(Germany) Maximilian Günther	Maserati	—N/a	1:08:837	1:08:402	1:08:271	1:08:141	1
2	27	(United Kingdom) Jake Dennis	Andretti-Porsche	1:09:013	—N/a	1:08:477	1:08:381	1:08:482	2
3	94	(Germany) Pascal Wehrlein	Porsche	—N/a	1:08:866	1:08:549	1:08:646	—N/a	3
4	25	(France) Jean-Éric Vergne	DS	1:09:205	—N/a	1:08:510	1:08:740	—N/a	4
5	1	(Belgium) Stoffel Vandoorne	DS	1:09:108	—N/a	1:08:588	—N/a	—N/a	5
6	48	(Switzerland) Edoardo Mortara	Maserati	—N/a	1:09:135	1:08:704	—N/a	—N/a	6
7	4	(Netherlands) Robin Frijns	ABT-Mahindra	1:09:271	—N/a	1:08:957	—N/a	—N/a	7
8	58	(Germany) René Rast	McLaren-Nissan	—N/a	1:09:025	1:09:205	—N/a	—N/a	8
9	51	(Switzerland) Nico Müller	ABT-Mahindra	—N/a	1:09:191	—N/a	—N/a	—N/a	9
10	37	(New Zealand) Nick Cassidy	Envision-Jaguar	1:09:273	—N/a	—N/a	—N/a	—N/a	10
11	9	(New Zealand) Mitch Evans	Jaguar	—N/a	1:09:202	—N/a	—N/a	—N/a	11
12	23	(France) Sacha Fenestraz	Nissan	1:09:333	—N/a	—N/a	—N/a	—N/a	12
13	16	(Switzerland) Sébastien Buemi	Envision-Jaguar	—N/a	1:09:216	—N/a	—N/a	—N/a	13
14	33	(United Kingdom) Dan Ticktum	NIO	1:09:339	—N/a	—N/a	—N/a	—N/a	14
15	13	(Portugal) António Félix da Costa	Porsche	—N/a	1:09:280	—N/a	—N/a	—N/a	15
16	10	(United Kingdom) Sam Bird	Jaguar	1:09:410	—N/a	—N/a	—N/a	—N/a	16
17	17	(France) Norman Nato	Nissan	—N/a	1:09:405	—N/a	—N/a	—N/a	17
18	3	(Brazil) Sérgio Sette Câmara	NIO	1:09:645	—N/a	—N/a	—N/a	—N/a	18
19	36	(Germany) David Beckmann	Andretti-Porsche	—N/a	1:09:470	—N/a	—N/a	—N/a	19
20	5	(United Kingdom) Jake Hughes	McLaren-Nissan	1:09:933	—N/a	—N/a	—N/a	—N/a	20
21	11	(Brazil) Lucas di Grassi	Mahindra	—N/a	1:09:562	—N/a	—N/a	—N/a	21
22	8	(Spain) Roberto Merhi	Mahindra	1:10:560	—N/a	—N/a	—N/a	—N/a	22

==== Race ====
Race 1 took place at 3:03 PM on 3 June.

Pos.	No.	Driver	Team	Laps	Time/Retired	Grid	Points
1	94	(Germany) Pascal Wehrlein	Porsche	36	42:21.995	3	25
2	27	(United Kingdom) Jake Dennis	Andretti-Porsche	36	+0.477	2	18
3	7	(Germany) Maximilian Günther	Maserati	36	+1.413	1	15+3^{1}
4	1	(Belgium) Stoffel Vandoorne	DS	36	+3.871	5	12
5	25	(France) Jean-Éric Vergne	DS	36	+4.986	4	10
6	48	(Switzerland) Edoardo Mortara	Maserati	36	+5.587	6	8
7	37	(New Zealand) Nick Cassidy	Envision-Jaguar	36	+5.982	10	6+1^{2}
8	13	(Portugal) António Félix da Costa	Porsche	36	+20.136	15	4
9	4	(Netherlands) Robin Frijns	ABT-Mahindra	36	+21.687	7	2
10	5	(United Kingdom) Jake Hughes	McLaren-Nissan	36	+23.356	20	1
11	51	(Switzerland) Nico Müller	ABT-Mahindra	36	+23.792	9	
12	17	(France) Norman Nato	Nissan	36	+25.162	17	
13	33	(United Kingdom) Dan Ticktum	NIO	36	+28.824	14	
14	11	(Brazil) Lucas di Grassi	Mahindra	36	+29.495	21	
15	58	(Germany) René Rast	McLaren-Nissan	36	+30.002 (Note: Rast received a 5-second time penalty for causing a collision with Bird.)	8	
16	36	(Germany) David Beckmann	Andretti-Porsche	36	+31.079	19	
17	3	(Brazil) Sérgio Sette Câmara	NIO	36	+32.102	18	
18	8	(Spain) Roberto Merhi	Mahindra	36	+46.662	22	
19	23	(France) Sacha Fenestraz	Nissan	36	+48.822 (Note: Fenestraz received a drive-through penalty, later converted to an 18-second time penalty, for overpower.)	12	
20	10	(United Kingdom) Sam Bird	Jaguar	36	+1:14:072 (Note: Bird received a 5-second time penalty for causing a collision with Evans.)	16	
21	16	(Switzerland) Sébastien Buemi	Envision-Jaguar	36	+1:18:081 (Note: Buemi received a drive-through penalty, converted to an 18-second time penalty, for activating attack mode too early.)	13	
Ret	9	(New Zealand) Mitch Evans	Jaguar	33	Collision	11	

Notes:

- ^1 – Pole position.
- ^2 – Fastest lap.

==== Standings after the race ====
Drivers' Championship standings

	Pos	Driver	Points
	1	(New Zealand) Nick Cassidy	128
	2	(Germany) Pascal Wehrlein	126
	3	(United Kingdom) Jake Dennis	114
1	4	(France) Jean-Éric Vergne	97
1	5	(New Zealand) Mitch Evans	94

Teams' Championship standings

	Pos	Constructor	Points
1	1	(Germany) Porsche	198
1	2	(United Kingdom) Envision-Jaguar	189
	3	(United Kingdom) Jaguar	156
	4	(United States) Andretti-Porsche	137
	5	(France) DS	137

- Notes: Only the top five positions are included for both sets of standings.

=== Race 2 ===
==== Qualifying ====
Qualifying for race 2 took place at 10:40 AM on 4 June.

Group draw
Group A	(New Zealand) CAS	(United Kingdom) DEN	(New Zealand) EVA	(United Kingdom) BIR	(United Kingdom) HUG	(Germany) RAS	(France) FEN	(United Kingdom) TIC	(France) NAT	(Netherlands) FRI	(Germany) BEC
Group B	(Germany) WEH	(France) JEV	(Portugal) DAC	(Switzerland) BUE	(Germany) GUE	(Belgium) VAN	(Brazil) DIG	(Switzerland) MOR	(Brazil) SET	(Switzerland) MUE	(Spain) MER

Qualifying 2 duels

Quarter-finals
A3	(New Zealand) Mitch Evans
A2	(France) Sacha Fenestraz
A1	(United Kingdom) Jake Dennis
A4	(United Kingdom) Jake Hughes
B3	(Germany) Pascal Wehrlein
B2	(Switzerland) Edoardo Mortara
B4	(Belgium) Stoffel Vandoorne
B1	(Germany) Maximilian Günther

Semi-finals
(New Zealand) Mitch Evans
(United Kingdom) Jake Dennis
(Switzerland) Edoardo Mortara
(Germany) Maximilian Günther

Final
(United Kingdom) Jake Dennis
(Germany) Maximilian Günther

==== Overall classification ====
Pos.	No.	Driver	Team	A	B	QF	SF	F	Grid
1	7	(Germany) Maximilian Günther	Maserati	—N/a	1:08.416	1:07.939	1:08.101	1:07.753	1
2	27	(United Kingdom) Jake Dennis	Andretti-Porsche	1:08.434	—N/a	1:08.313	1:08.076	1:08.338	2
3	9	(New Zealand) Mitch Evans	Jaguar	1:08.521	—N/a	1:08.229	1:08.077	—N/a	3
4	48	(Switzerland) Edoardo Mortara	Maserati	—N/a	1:08.424	1:08.245	1:08.443	—N/a	4
5	1	(Belgium) Stoffel Vandoorne	DS	—N/a	1:08.602	1:08.289	—N/a	—N/a	5
6	94	(Germany) Pascal Wehrlein	Porsche	—N/a	1:08.516	1:08.450	—N/a	—N/a	6
7	23	(France) Sacha Fenestraz	Nissan	1:08.472	—N/a	1:08.664	—N/a	—N/a	7
8	5	(United Kingdom) Jake Hughes	McLaren-Nissan	1:08.600	—N/a	1:08.962	—N/a	—N/a	8
9	25	(France) Jean-Éric Vergne	DS	—N/a	1:08.603	—N/a	—N/a	—N/a	9
10	37	(New Zealand) Nick Cassidy	Envision-Jaguar	1:08.603	—N/a	—N/a	—N/a	—N/a	10
11	13	(Portugal) António Félix da Costa	Porsche	—N/a	1:08.609	—N/a	—N/a	—N/a	11
12	17	(France) Norman Nato	Nissan	1:08.681	—N/a	—N/a	—N/a	—N/a	12
13	16	(Switzerland) Sébastien Buemi	Envision-Jaguar	—N/a	1:08.733	—N/a	—N/a	—N/a	13
14	10	(United Kingdom) Sam Bird	Jaguar	1:08.792	—N/a	—N/a	—N/a	—N/a	14
15	3	(Brazil) Sérgio Sette Câmara	NIO	—N/a	1:08.796	—N/a	—N/a	—N/a	15
16	58	(Germany) René Rast	McLaren-Nissan	1:08.805	—N/a	—N/a	—N/a	—N/a	16
17	51	(Switzerland) Nico Müller	ABT-Mahindra	—N/a	1:08.924	—N/a	—N/a	—N/a	17
18	36	(Germany) David Beckmann	Andretti-Porsche	1:08.840	—N/a	—N/a	—N/a	—N/a	18
19	11	(Brazil) Lucas di Grassi	Mahindra	—N/a	1:09.048	—N/a	—N/a	—N/a	19
20	33	(United Kingdom) Dan Ticktum	NIO	1:08.904	—N/a	—N/a	—N/a	—N/a	20
21	8	(Spain) Roberto Merhi	Mahindra	—N/a	1:09.489	—N/a	—N/a	—N/a	21
22	4	(Netherlands) Robin Frijns	ABT-Mahindra	1:08.937	—N/a	—N/a	—N/a	—N/a	22

==== Race ====
Race 2 took place at 3:03 PM on 4 June.

Pos.	No.	Driver	Team	Laps	Time/Retired	Grid	Points
1	7	(Germany) Maximilian Günther	Maserati	38	44:57.285	1	25+3^{1}
2	27	(United Kingdom) Jake Dennis	Andretti-Porsche	38	+2.822	2	18+1^{2}
3	9	(New Zealand) Mitch Evans	Jaguar	38	+18.498	3	15
4	23	(France) Sacha Fenestraz	Nissan	38	+19.307	7	12
5	17	(France) Norman Nato	Nissan	38	+19.924	12	10
6	94	(Germany) Pascal Wehrlein	Porsche	38	+20.108	6	8
7	13	(Portugal) António Félix da Costa	Porsche	38	+20.521	11	6
8	48	(Switzerland) Edoardo Mortara	Maserati	38	+20.996	4	4
9	1	(Belgium) Stoffel Vandoorne	DS	38	+26.630	5	2
10	16	(Switzerland) Sébastien Buemi	Envision-Jaguar	38	+27.273	13	1
11	33	(United Kingdom) Dan Ticktum	NIO	38	+28.614	20	
12	51	(Switzerland) Nico Müller	ABT-Mahindra	38	+28.787	17	
13	4	(Netherlands) Robin Frijns	ABT-Mahindra	38	+29.125	22	
14	11	(Brazil) Lucas di Grassi	Mahindra	38	+29.530	19	
15	58	(Germany) René Rast	McLaren-Nissan	38	+30.670	16	
16	25	(France) Jean-Éric Vergne	DS	38	+56.598	9	
17	8	(Spain) Roberto Merhi	Mahindra	38	+1:06.645	21	
18	37	(New Zealand) Nick Cassidy	Envision-Jaguar	38	+1:06.879	10	
Ret	5	(United Kingdom) Jake Hughes	McLaren-Nissan	36		8	
Ret	36	(Germany) David Beckmann	Andretti-Porsche	5		18	
DNS	10	(United Kingdom) Sam Bird	Jaguar	0	Did not start	14	
DNS	3	(Brazil) Sérgio Sette Câmara	NIO	0	Did not start	15	

Notes:

- ^1 – Pole position.
- ^2 – Fastest lap.

==== Standings after the race ====
Drivers' Championship standings

	Pos	Driver	Points
1	1	(Germany) Pascal Wehrlein	134
1	2	(United Kingdom) Jake Dennis	133
2	3	(New Zealand) Nick Cassidy	128
1	4	(New Zealand) Mitch Evans	109
1	5	(France) Jean-Éric Vergne	97

Teams' Championship standings

Pos	Constructor	Points
1	(Germany) Porsche	212
2	(United Kingdom) Envision-Jaguar	190
3	(United Kingdom) Jaguar	171
4	(United States) Andretti-Porsche	156
5	(France) DS	139

- Notes: Only the top five positions are included for both sets of standings.

== Notes ==
Previous race: 2023 Monaco ePrix	FIA Formula E World Championship; 2022–23 season	Next race: 2023 Portland ePrix
Previous race: 2022 Jakarta ePrix	Jakarta ePrix	Next race: 2025 Jakarta ePrix
