= Jakarta ePrix =

Annual race of the Formula E championship held in Jakarta

- Jakarta International e-Prix Circuit (2022–2023, 2025)
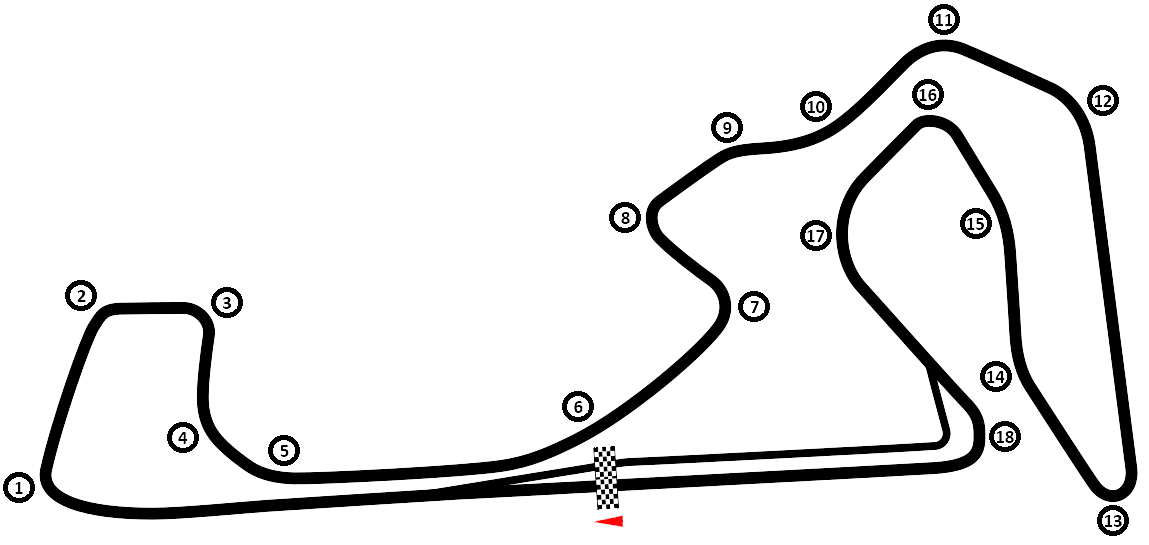

Race information
- Number of times held: 3
- First held: 2022 (Note: The event was originally planned for 2020 but was postponed for two years because of the COVID-19 pandemic.)
- Last held: 2025
- Most wins (drivers): None (each race was won by a different driver)
- Most wins (constructors): None (each race was won by a different team)
- Circuit length: 2.370 km (1.473 miles)
- Laps: 38

Last race (2025)

Pole position
- (United Kingdom) Jake Dennis; Andretti-Porsche; 1:06.713

Podium
- 1. (United Kingdom) Dan Ticktum; Cupra Kiro-Porsche; 48:33.418; 2. (Switzerland) Edoardo Mortara; Mahindra; +0.371; 3. (Switzerland) Sébastien Buemi; Envision-Jaguar; +2.513

Fastest lap
- (France) Norman Nato; Nissan; 1:07.453

The Jakarta ePrix was a race of the single-seater, electrically powered Formula E championship, held in Jakarta, Indonesia, in 2022, 2023 and 2025. Formula E calls each of its race events an ePrix. It was the first FIA-sanctioned race in Indonesia since the A1 GP Grand Prix of Nations race in Sentul in 2006 and the first motor racing event in the country to be administered directly by the FIA.

Jakarta was announced as a host in 2019, with an agreement intended to run for five consecutive years from 2020 and a street circuit planned around the National Monument. The 2020 race was cancelled because of the COVID-19 pandemic, and the National Monument plan was later abandoned. In October 2021 the event was added to the 2021–22 Formula E World Championship, and every edition was held at the purpose-built Jakarta International e-Prix Circuit in Ancol, a 2.4 km (1.5 mi) layout with 18 corners. Preparations were accompanied by political and public debate over the commitment fees, the choice of venue and the construction tender. The 2022 edition included the Allianz E-Village fan festival, and the 2023 and 2025 editions had title sponsors.

Mitch Evans won the first race in 2022. The 2023 edition consisted of two races, won by Pascal Wehrlein and Maximilian Günther, and Dan Ticktum won in 2025. The event was not held in 2024 because of the 2024 Indonesian presidential election. No driver or team won more than once in Jakarta, and the 2025 race was the most recent edition as of 2026.

== History ==
=== Original plans (2019–2020) ===
The plan to include Jakarta in the 2020 Formula E Championship was conceived in Monaco in April 2019. In July 2019 in New York City, the Governor of Jakarta, Anies Baswedan, met with the FIA to discuss hosting Formula E from the 2019–20 season. The decision was made in August and the event was announced in September 2019, with Jakarta intended to host the race for five consecutive years from 2020.

The first race was scheduled for 6 June 2020 as part of the 2019–20 season. The circuit was initially to run around the National Monument (Monas) and Merdeka Square, both in Central Jakarta. Early reports described a route of 2.7 to 3 km with 12 to 13 corners. The layout was finalised in February 2020 at 2.588 km (1.608 mi) long, with 11 corners and a width of 5 to 12 m. It started in front of Jakarta's city hall and held an FIA Grade 3E circuit licence.

The race was cancelled shortly afterwards because of the COVID-19 pandemic, and track paving around Monas was halted in March 2020. The Monas plan was later abandoned because of permit issues and the circuit's proximity to vital state buildings within the capital's restricted Ring 1 security zone.

=== Preparations (2021–2022) ===
In August 2021, the Indonesian Democratic Party of Struggle (PDI-P) and the Indonesian Solidarity Party sought an interpellation (a formal council inquiry) against Anies Baswedan over the inclusion of the Jakarta ePrix in his 2021–22 regional priorities; the attempt was unsuccessful. According to Prasetio, the event could burden future governors after Anies left office.

On 15 October 2021, it was announced that the race would be the ninth round of the 2021–22 Formula E World Championship. It was the first ePrix in Indonesia, and Indonesia became the fourth Asian country to host one, following China (including Hong Kong), Malaysia and Saudi Arabia.

The Corruption Eradication Commission (KPK) examined the commitment fees paid for hosting the event. The fee rose each season, as shown below. Under Government Regulation No. 19 of 2019 on Regional Finance Management (Article 98, paragraph 6), funding of multi-year activities may not extend beyond the end of a governor's term, except for national priorities and strategic affairs, and Anies Baswedan was due to leave office in 2022. In January 2022, Hardiyanto Kenneth, a member of the Regional People's Representative Council (DPRD) in Jakarta, requested that the commitment fee be returned.

Commitment fee of the Jakarta ePrix by season
Season	Fee (£ million)
2019–20	20
2020–21	22
2021–22	24
2022–23	26.62
2023–24	29.282

The announcement of the race's location was delayed to January 2022 from the original schedule of December 2021. Dedek Prayudi, executive director of the Center of Youth and Population Research (CYPR), commented that the uncertainty could lead to the 2022 race being delayed or cancelled. As of December 2021, five sites were under consideration: Jalan Jenderal Sudirman, Pantai Indah Kapuk (PIK), JIEXPO Kemayoran, Jakarta International Stadium (JIS) and Ancol. The main director of PT Jakarta Propertindo (Jakpro), a company owned by the Jakarta provincial government, Widi Amanasto, said the location would be announced on 23 December, and the event's chief organizer, Ahmad Sahroni, said that only two options remained, Ancol or JIEXPO Kemayoran. On 22 December, after several postponements, Ancol was selected.

The Ancol site drew objections because the circuit was to be built on a mud dump used during the governorships of Joko Widodo and Basuki Tjahaja Purnama. PDI-P opposed the logging of trees at the location; Widi Amanasto said the trees would not be cut down but relocated. Jakarta's vice governor, Ahmad Riza Patria, said the race could not be held on swampland.

As of 24 January 2022, the tender to construct the circuit was declared failed on the e-procurement site of PT Jakpro. Jakarta Regional People's Representative Council member Gembong Warsono alleged that the failure was intentional, so that PT Jakpro could select contractors directly. On 5 February 2022, it was announced that PT Jaya Konstruksi Manggala Pratama had won the tender. Construction of the circuit began in February 2022, track paving was finished in April 2022, and all supporting infrastructure was declared complete by 1 June 2022, days before the first race.

=== 2022 ===
On 27 May 2022, a grandstand roof at the Ancol circuit collapsed in strong winds.

The inaugural race was held in hot and humid conditions. After first practice, Jaguar driver Mitch Evans said that the track had good grip that dropped away sharply off the racing line, and that several corners required drivers to lift off the throttle earlier than usual. He added that he enjoyed the layout. Jean-Éric Vergne took pole position, but Evans won the race after passing Vergne for the lead at Turn 7 on lap 31. Energy management then became critical for the two front-runners in the heat, which allowed Edoardo Mortara to close on the lead group. Evans held off both rivals in the closing stages despite fading rear tyres and finished ahead of Vergne and Mortara, with all three separated by less than a second. Evans also set the fastest lap. On 4 June 2022, a portion of the circuit caught fire.

=== 2023 ===
The 2023 edition was run as two races. Pascal Wehrlein won Race 1 for Porsche, ahead of Jake Dennis and Maximilian Günther, who had taken pole position. Günther won Race 2 from pole position, again ahead of Dennis, with Mitch Evans third.

=== 2024 hiatus and 2025 ===
The Jakarta ePrix was not held in 2024, as the date would have coincided with the 2024 Indonesian presidential election. The event returned in 2025, when Dan Ticktum won for Cupra Kiro-Porsche, 0.371 seconds ahead of Mortara (Mahindra) and 2.513 seconds ahead of Sébastien Buemi (Envision-Jaguar). Jake Dennis took pole position in 1:06.713, and Norman Nato set the fastest lap in 1:07.453.

== Official names and sponsors ==
Edition	Sponsor(s)	Official name	Ref.
2022	No sponsor	2022 Jakarta ePrix	
2023	Gulavit	2023 Gulavit Jakarta ePrix	
2025	Sarinah	2025 Sarinah Jakarta ePrix	

== Circuit ==
The Jakarta International e-Prix Circuit, which hosted every edition, is 2.4 km (1.5 mi) long and 12 m wide, with 18 corners. It runs clockwise and has a 600 m main straight. The circuit has an FIA Grade 3E licence, semi-permanent pit garages and nine semi-permanent enclosed grandstands with a combined capacity of 50,000 spectators.

=== Access ===
The circuit is located near Ancol Beach on Jakarta Bay, roughly a 30-minute drive west of Soekarno–Hatta International Airport. For the 2022 race, public transport was recommended, and private vehicles were permitted inside the circuit grounds only for holders of Jakarta Royal Suite 1A tickets. Free shuttle buses ran from JIEXPO Kemayoran on race day for holders of Grandstand, Hospitality and Circuit Festival tickets, while holders of Ancol Festival tickets could enter via the PGU South and West gates, Busway and Marina, without dedicated parking.

== Fan festival ==
The 2022 ePrix included the Allianz E-Village fan festival, which offered simulator rigs, driver autograph sessions, displays of electric and hybrid vehicles from manufacturers including Audi, Jaguar and BMW, sponsor stands, food and drink vendors, a children's area, and live music from Indonesian acts including Kotak, Gigi and D'Masiv.

== Results ==
No driver or team won more than once in Jakarta. Porsche-powered cars won two of the four races (2023 Race 1 and 2025). Günther's win in 2023 Race 2 was the only win from pole position, and Dennis finished second in both 2023 races and took pole position in 2025 without winning in Jakarta.

Edition	Track	Winner	Second	Third	Pole position	Fastest lap	Ref
2022	Jakarta International e-Prix Circuit	(New Zealand) Mitch Evans; Jaguar	(France) Jean-Éric Vergne; Techeetah-DS	(Switzerland) Edoardo Mortara; Venturi-Mercedes	(France) Jean-Éric Vergne; Techeetah-DS	(New Zealand) Mitch Evans; Jaguar	
2023 Race 1	Jakarta International e-Prix Circuit	(Germany) Pascal Wehrlein; Porsche	(United Kingdom) Jake Dennis; Andretti-Porsche	(Germany) Maximilian Günther; Maserati	(Germany) Maximilian Günther; Maserati	(Switzerland) Sébastien Buemi; Envision-Jaguar	
2023 Race 2	Jakarta International e-Prix Circuit	(Germany) Maximilian Günther; Maserati	(United Kingdom) Jake Dennis; Andretti-Porsche	(New Zealand) Mitch Evans; Jaguar	(Germany) Maximilian Günther; Maserati	(United Kingdom) Jake Dennis; Andretti-Porsche	
2025	Jakarta International e-Prix Circuit	(United Kingdom) Dan Ticktum; Cupra Kiro-Porsche	(Switzerland) Edoardo Mortara; Mahindra	(Switzerland) Sébastien Buemi; Envision-Jaguar	(United Kingdom) Jake Dennis; Andretti-Porsche	(France) Norman Nato; Nissan	

== See also ==
- Electric motorsport
- List of Formula E ePrix
