= 2025 Jakarta ePrix =

Race 12 of 16 of the 2024–25 Formula E season
← Previous race	Next race →
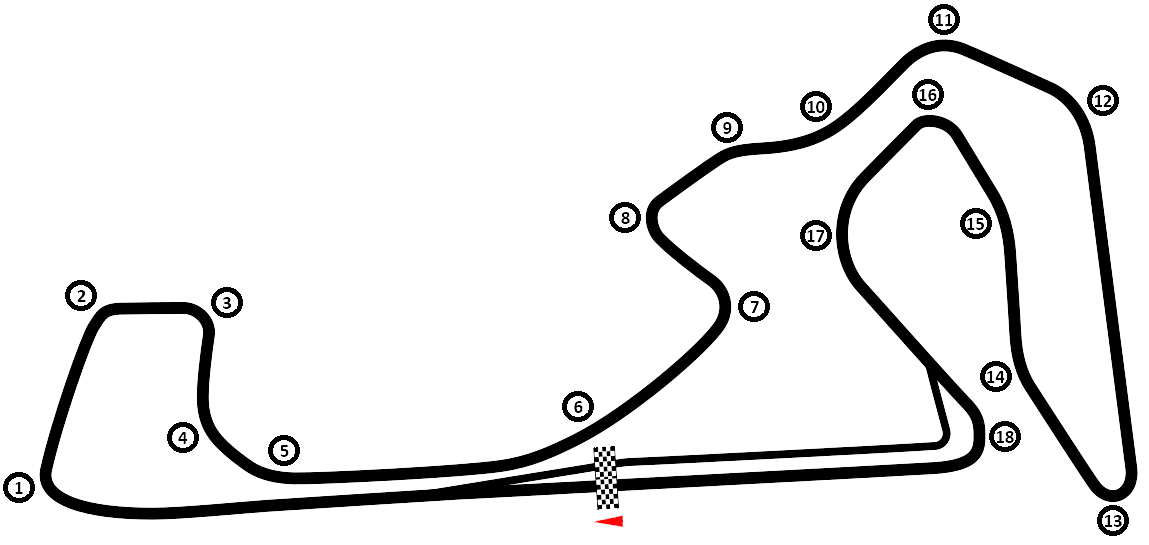

Race details
- Date: 21 June 2025
- Official name: 2025 Sarinah Jakarta E-Prix
- Location: Jakarta International e-Prix Circuit, Ancol, Jakarta, Indonesia
- Course: Street circuit
- Course length: 2.370 km (1.473 mi)
- Distance: 38 laps, 90.081 km (55.974 mi)
- Weather: Cloudy

Pole position
Driver	(United Kingdom) Jake Dennis	Andretti-Porsche
- Time: 1:06:713

Fastest lap
Driver	(France) Norman Nato	Nissan
- Time: 1:07:453 on lap 35

Podium
First	(United Kingdom) Dan Ticktum	Cupra Kiro-Porsche
Second	(Switzerland) Edoardo Mortara	Mahindra
Third	(Switzerland) Sébastien Buemi	Envision-Jaguar

The 2025 Jakarta ePrix, known officially as the 2025 Sarinah Jakarta E-Prix was a Formula E electric car race held at the Jakarta International e-Prix Circuit in Ancol, northern Jakarta on 21 June 2025. It served as the 12th round of the 2024-25 Formula E season and the third edition of the Jakarta ePrix after the 2023 event, returning after its cancellation in 2024 due to the country's general election.

== Background ==
Following the 2025 Shanghai ePrix, Oliver Rowland led the driver's championship from Pascal Wehrlein with a 68 point gap. António Félix da Costa entered the tenth round in 3rd, with 83 points behind Rowland.

== Classification ==
(All times are in WIB)

=== Qualifying ===
Qualifying took place at 10:20 AM on 21 June.

Group draw
Group A	(United Kingdom) ROW	(Portugal) DAC	(France) JEV	(New Zealand) CAS	(United Kingdom) DEN	(Belgium) VAN	(Switzerland) MOR	(Switzerland) MUE	(United Kingdom) BIR	(France) NAT	(Barbados) MAL
Group B	(Germany) WEH	(United Kingdom) BAR	(Germany) GUE	(Netherlands) DEV	(United Kingdom) TIC	(Switzerland) BUE	(United Kingdom) HUG	(Brazil) DIG	(New Zealand) EVA	(Netherlands) FRI	(Germany) BEC

==== Qualifying duels ====
Quarter-finals
A3	(Switzerland) Edoardo Mortara
A2	(United Kingdom) Jake Dennis
A4	(New Zealand) Nick Cassidy
A1	(France) Jean-Éric Vergne
B3	(Switzerland) Sébastien Buemi
B2	(Netherlands) Nyck de Vries
B4	(United Kingdom) Dan Ticktum
B1	(United Kingdom) Taylor Barnard

Semi-finals
(United Kingdom) Jake Dennis
(New Zealand) Nick Cassidy
(Netherlands) Nyck de Vries
(United Kingdom) Taylor Barnard

Final
(United Kingdom) Jake Dennis
(United Kingdom) Taylor Barnard

==== Overall classification ====
Pos.	No.	Driver	Team	A	B	QF	SF	F	Grid
1	27	(United Kingdom) Jake Dennis	Andretti-Porsche	1:09:922	—N/a	1:07:249	1:06:765	1:06:713	1
2	5	(United Kingdom) Taylor Barnard	McLaren-Nissan	—N/a	1:08:968	1:06:953	1:06:759	1:07:715	2
3	21	(Netherlands) Nyck de Vries	Mahindra	—N/a	1:08:968	1:07:170	1:07:041	—N/a	3
4	37	(New Zealand) Nick Cassidy	Jaguar	1:10.014	—N/a	1:07:141	1:09:126	—N/a	4
5	33	(United Kingdom) Dan Ticktum	Cupra Kiro-Porsche	—N/a	1:09:113	1:06:958	—N/a	—N/a	5
6	48	(Switzerland) Edoardo Mortara	Mahindra	1:09:944	—N/a	1:07:289	—N/a	—N/a	6
7	16	(Switzerland) Sébastien Buemi	Envision-Jaguar	—N/a	1:09:024	1:07:601	—N/a	—N/a	7
8	25	(France) Jean-Éric Vergne	DS Penske	1:09:460	—N/a	1:08:033	—N/a	—N/a	8
9	13	(Portugal) António Félix da Costa	Porsche	1:10:082	—N/a	—N/a	—N/a	—N/a	9
10	9	(New Zealand) Mitch Evans	Jaguar	—N/a	1:09:128	—N/a	—N/a	—N/a	10
11	8	(United Kingdom) Sam Bird	McLaren-Nissan	1:10:285	—N/a	—N/a	—N/a	—N/a	11
12	7	(Germany) Maximilian Günther	DS Penske	—N/a	1:09:188	—N/a	—N/a	—N/a	12
13	51	(Switzerland) Nico Müller	Andretti-Porsche	1:10:304	—N/a	—N/a	—N/a	—N/a	13
14	1	(Germany) Pascal Wehrlein	Porsche	—N/a	1:09:330	—N/a	—N/a	—N/a	14
15	2	(Belgium) Stoffel Vandoorne	Maserati	1:10:402	—N/a	—N/a	—N/a	—N/a	15
16	3	(Germany) David Beckmann	Cupra Kiro-Porsche	—N/a	1:09:383	—N/a	—N/a	—N/a	16
17	23	(United Kingdom) Oliver Rowland	Nissan	1:10:451	—N/a	—N/a	—N/a	—N/a	17
18	55	(United Kingdom) Jake Hughes	Maserati	—N/a	1:09:649	—N/a	—N/a	—N/a	18
19	22	(Barbados) Zane Maloney	Lola Yamaha ABT	1:10:503	—N/a	—N/a	—N/a	—N/a	19
20	11	(Brazil) Lucas di Grassi	Lola Yamaha ABT	—N/a	1:09:878	—N/a	—N/a	—N/a	20
21	17	(France) Norman Nato	Nissan	1:10:693	—N/a	—N/a	—N/a	—N/a	21
22	4	(Netherlands) Robin Frijns	Envision-Jaguar	—N/a	1:10:799	—N/a	—N/a	—N/a	22

=== Race ===
Race took place at 3:05 PM on 21 June.

Pos.	No.	Driver	Team	Laps	Time/Retired	Grid	Points
1	33	(United Kingdom) Dan Ticktum	Cupra Kiro-Porsche	38	48:33.418	5	25
2	48	(Switzerland) Edoardo Mortara	Mahindra	38	+0.371	6	18
3	16	(Switzerland) Sébastien Buemi	Envision-Jaguar	38	+2.513	7	15+1^{2} (Note: Nato had taken the fastest lap in the race, but was ineligible to receive the point due to being outside the Top 10.)
4	51	(Switzerland) Nico Müller	Andretti-Porsche	38	+2.936	13	12
5	13	(Portugal) António Félix da Costa	Porsche	38	+4.316	9	10
6	37	(New Zealand) Nick Cassidy	Jaguar	38	+4.833	4	8
7	5	(United Kingdom) Taylor Barnard	McLaren-Nissan	38	+5.741	2	6
8	8	(United Kingdom) Sam Bird	McLaren-Nissan	38	+6.060	11	4
9	4	(Netherlands) Robin Frijns	Envision-Jaguar	38	+7.745	22	2
10	23	(United Kingdom) Oliver Rowland	Nissan	38	+10.142 (Note: Rowland received a 5-second time penalty for causing a collision with Günther.)	16	1
11	1	(Germany) Pascal Wehrlein	Porsche	38	+13.128	17	
12	9	(New Zealand) Mitch Evans	Jaguar	38	+14.387	10	
13	11	(Brazil) Lucas di Grassi	Lola Yamaha ABT	38	+14.965	20	
14	17	(France) Norman Nato	Nissan	38	+15.241	21	
15	25	(France) Jean-Eric Vergne	DS Penske	38	+20.541 (Note: Vergne received a 5-second time penalty for causing a collision with Evans.)	8	
16	3	(Germany) David Beckmann	Cupra Kiro-Porsche	38	+21.011 (Note: Beckmann received a 5-second time penalty for failing to follow procedures under safety car conditions.)	15	
17	27	(United Kingdom) Jake Dennis	Andretti-Porsche	38	+33.034	1	3^{1}
18	22	(Barbados) Zane Maloney	Lola Yamaha ABT	38	+34.737	19	
Ret	21	(Netherlands) Nyck De Vries	Mahindra	31	Technical Issue (Note: De Vries had received a 10-second time penalty for causing a collision with Jake Dennis prior to retiring from the race.)	3	
Ret	2	(Belgium) Stoffel Vandoorne	Maserati	30	Accident - Brake Issue	14	
Ret	55	(United Kingdom) Jake Hughes	Maserati	29	Overheating	18	
Ret	7	(Germany) Maximilian Günther	DS Penske	8	Collision damage	12	

Notes:

- ^1 – Pole position.
- ^2 – Fastest lap.

=== Standings after the race ===
Drivers' Championship standings

	Pos	Driver	Points
	1	(United Kingdom) Oliver Rowland	172
	2	(Germany) Pascal Wehrlein	103
	3	(Portugal) António Félix da Costa	98
	4	(United Kingdom) Taylor Barnard	92
5	5	(United Kingdom) Dan Ticktum	80

Teams' Championship standings

Pos	Team	Points
1	(Germany) Porsche	201
2	(Japan) Nissan	191
3	(United States) DS Penske	145
4	(United Kingdom) McLaren	123
5	(India) Mahindra	121

Manufacturers' Championship standings

Pos	Manufacturer	Points
1	(Japan) Nissan	299
2	(Germany) Porsche	296
3	(Netherlands) Stellantis	215
4	(United Kingdom) Jaguar	209
5	(India) Mahindra	147

- Notes: Only the top five positions are included for all three sets of standings.

== Notes ==
Previous race: 2025 Shanghai ePrix	FIA Formula E World Championship; 2024–25 season	Next race: 2025 Berlin ePrix
Previous race: 2023 Jakarta ePrix	Jakarta ePrix	Next race: N/A
