= 2022 Marrakesh ePrix =

Race 10 of 16 of the 2021–22 Formula E season
← Previous race	Next race →

Race details
- Date: 2 July 2022
- Official name: 2022 Marrakesh E-Prix
- Location: Circuit International Automobile Moulay El Hassan, Marrakesh
- Course: Permanent racing facility
- Course length: 2.971 km (1.846 mi)
- Distance: 34 laps, 101.014 km (62.767 mi)
- Weather: Mostly sunny

Pole position
Driver	(Portugal) António Félix da Costa	DS Techeetah
- Time: 1:17.010

Fastest lap
Driver	(Brazil) Lucas di Grassi	ROKiT Venturi Racing
- Time: 1:20.909 on lap 14

Podium
First	(Switzerland) Edoardo Mortara	ROKiT Venturi Racing
Second	(Portugal) António Félix da Costa	DS Techeetah
Third	(New Zealand) Mitch Evans	Jaguar TCS Racing

The 2022 Marrakesh ePrix was a Formula E electric car race held at Circuit International Automobile Moulay El Hassan in Marrakesh. The race was held on 2 July 2022. It was the 10th round of the 2021-22 Formula E World Championship. The race was a replacement for the previously scheduled Vancouver ePrix and made its first appearance since 2020. Edoardo Mortara won the race to claim the lead of the championship, while pole-sitter António Félix da Costa and Mitch Evans rounded out the podium.

== Classification ==
=== Qualifying ===
Group draw
Group A	(Belgium) VAN	(Switzerland) MOR	(Netherlands) FRI	(Germany) LOT	(Brazil) DIG	(United Kingdom) DEN	(New Zealand) CAS	(Switzerland) BUE	(Germany) GUE	(United States) ASK	(Brazil) SET
Group B	(France) JEV	(New Zealand) EVA	(Netherlands) DEV	(Germany) WEH	(Portugal) DAC	(United Kingdom) BIR	(United Kingdom) ROW	(United Kingdom) TUR	(United Kingdom) SIM	(United Kingdom) TIC	(Italy) GIO

==== Qualifying duels ====
Quarter-finals
B4	(New Zealand) Mitch Evans
A1	(Switzerland) Edoardo Mortara
B3	(Germany) Pascal Wehrlein
A2	(New Zealand) Nick Cassidy
A3	(United Kingdom) Jake Dennis
B2	(France) Jean-Éric Vergne
A4	(United States) Oliver Askew
B1	(Portugal) António Félix da Costa

Semi-finals
(Switzerland) Edoardo Mortara
(Germany) Pascal Wehrlein
(France) Jean-Éric Vergne
(Portugal) António Félix da Costa

Final
(Switzerland) Edoardo Mortara
(Portugal) António Félix da Costa

===== Overall classification =====
Pos.	No.	Driver	Team	A	B	QF	SF	F	Grid
1	13	(Portugal) António Félix da Costa	Techeetah-DS	—N/a	1:18.150	1:17.202	1:17.091	1:17.070	1
2	48	(Switzerland) Edoardo Mortara	Venturi-Mercedes	1:18.386	—N/a	1:17.002	1:17.129	1:17.151	2
3	25	(France) Jean-Éric Vergne	Techeetah-DS	—N/a	1:18.222	1:16.982	1:17.115	—N/a	3
4	94	(Germany) Pascal Wehrlein	Porsche	—N/a	1:18.249	1:17.291	1:17.305	—N/a	4
5	27	(United Kingdom) Jake Dennis	Andretti-BMW	1:18.496	—N/a	1:17.348	—N/a	—N/a	5
6	9	(New Zealand) Mitch Evans	Jaguar	—N/a	1:18.318	1:17.476	—N/a	—N/a	6
7	28	(United States) Oliver Askew	Andretti-BMW	1:18.540	—N/a	1:17.575	—N/a	—N/a	7
8	37	(New Zealand) Nick Cassidy	Envision-Audi	1:18.452	—N/a	1:17.578	—N/a	—N/a	8
9	17	(Netherlands) Nyck de Vries	Mercedes	—N/a	1:18.393	—N/a	—N/a	—N/a	9
10	11	(Brazil) Lucas di Grassi	Venturi-Mercedes	1:18.564	—N/a	—N/a	—N/a	—N/a	10
11	30	(United Kingdom) Oliver Rowland	Mahindra	—N/a	1:18.401	—N/a	—N/a	—N/a	11
12	7	(Brazil) Sérgio Sette Câmara	Dragon-Penske	1:18.608	—N/a	—N/a	—N/a	—N/a	12
13	10	(United Kingdom) Sam Bird	Jaguar	—N/a	1:18.523	—N/a	—N/a	—N/a	13
14	23	(Switzerland) Sébastien Buemi	e.dams-Nissan	1:18.654	—N/a	—N/a	—N/a	—N/a	17^{1}
15	3	(United Kingdom) Oliver Turvey	NIO	—N/a	1:18.765	—N/a	—N/a	—N/a	14
16	4	(Netherlands) Robin Frijns	Envision-Audi	1:18.663	—N/a	—N/a	—N/a	—N/a	15
17	33	(United Kingdom) Dan Ticktum	NIO	—N/a	1:18.805	—N/a	—N/a	—N/a	16
18	22	(Germany) Maximilian Günther	e.dams-Nissan	1:18.855	—N/a	—N/a	—N/a	—N/a	18
19	29	(United Kingdom) Alexander Sims	Mahindra	—N/a	1:19.089	—N/a	—N/a	—N/a	19
20	5	(Belgium) Stoffel Vandoorne	Mercedes	1:18.896	—N/a	—N/a	—N/a	—N/a	20
21	99	(Italy) Antonio Giovinazzi	Dragon-Penske	—N/a	—N/a	—N/a	—N/a	—N/a	21
22	36	(Germany) André Lotterer	Porsche	—N/a	—N/a	—N/a	—N/a	—N/a	22

Notes:

- ^1 – Sébastien Buemi received a 3-place grid penalty for speeding under red flag.

=== Race ===
Pos.	No.	Driver	Team	Laps	Time/Retired	Grid	Points
1	48	(Switzerland) Edoardo Mortara	Venturi-Mercedes	34	46:45.410	2	25
2	13	(Portugal) António Félix da Costa	Techeetah-DS	34	+2.297	1	21+3^{1}
3	9	(New Zealand) Mitch Evans	Jaguar	34	+6.270	6	18
4	25	(France) Jean-Éric Vergne	Techeetah-DS	34	+6.965	3	12
5	11	(Brazil) Lucas di Grassi	Venturi-Mercedes	34	+7.787	10	10+1^{2}
6	17	(Netherlands) Nyck de Vries	Mercedes	34	+8.394	9	8
7	27	(United Kingdom) Jake Dennis	Andretti-BMW	34	+12.084	5	6
8	5	(Belgium) Stoffel Vandoorne	Mercedes	34	+14.541	20	4
9	10	(United Kingdom) Sam Bird	Jaguar	34	+15.048	13	2
10	30	(United Kingdom) Oliver Rowland	Mahindra	34	+15.270	11	1
11	28	(United States) Oliver Askew	Andretti-BMW	34	+16.336	7	
12	94	(Germany) Pascal Wehrlein	Porsche	34	+30.043	4	
13	37	(New Zealand) Nick Cassidy	Envision-Audi	34	+31.970	8	
14	29	(United Kingdom) Alexander Sims	Mahindra	34	+32.332	19	
15	36	(Germany) André Lotterer	Porsche	34	+32.364	22	
16	23	(Switzerland) Sébastien Buemi	e.dams-Nissan	34	+33.707	17	
17	3	(United Kingdom) Oliver Turvey	NIO	34	+35.018	14	
18	4	(Netherlands) Robin Frijns	Envision-Audi	34	+35.686	15	
19	99	(Italy) Antonio Giovinazzi	Dragon-Penske	34	+40.887	21	
20	7	(Brazil) Sérgio Sette Câmara	Dragon-Penske	34	+42.764	12	
Ret	22	(Germany) Maximilian Günther	e.dams-Nissan	32	Battery	18	
Ret	33	(United Kingdom) Dan Ticktum	NIO	28	Battery	16	

Notes:

- ^1 – Pole position.
- ^2 – Fastest lap.

==== Standings after the race ====
Drivers' Championship standings

	Pos	Driver	Points
2	1	(Switzerland) Edoardo Mortara	139
	2	(France) Jean-Éric Vergne	128
2	3	(Belgium) Stoffel Vandoorne	125
	4	(New Zealand) Mitch Evans	124
	5	(Netherlands) Robin Frijns	81

Teams' Championship standings

	Pos	Constructor	Points
2	1	(Monaco) Venturi-Mercedes	205
	2	(France) Techeetah-DS	203
2	3	(Germany) Mercedes	198
	4	(United Kingdom) Jaguar	155
	5	(Germany) Porsche	116

Previous race: 2022 Jakarta ePrix	FIA Formula E World Championship; 2021–22 season	Next race: 2022 New York City ePrix
Previous race: 2020 Marrakesh ePrix	Marrakesh ePrix	Next race: N/A
