= Jakarta International e-Prix Circuit =

Race track in Jakarta, Indonesia

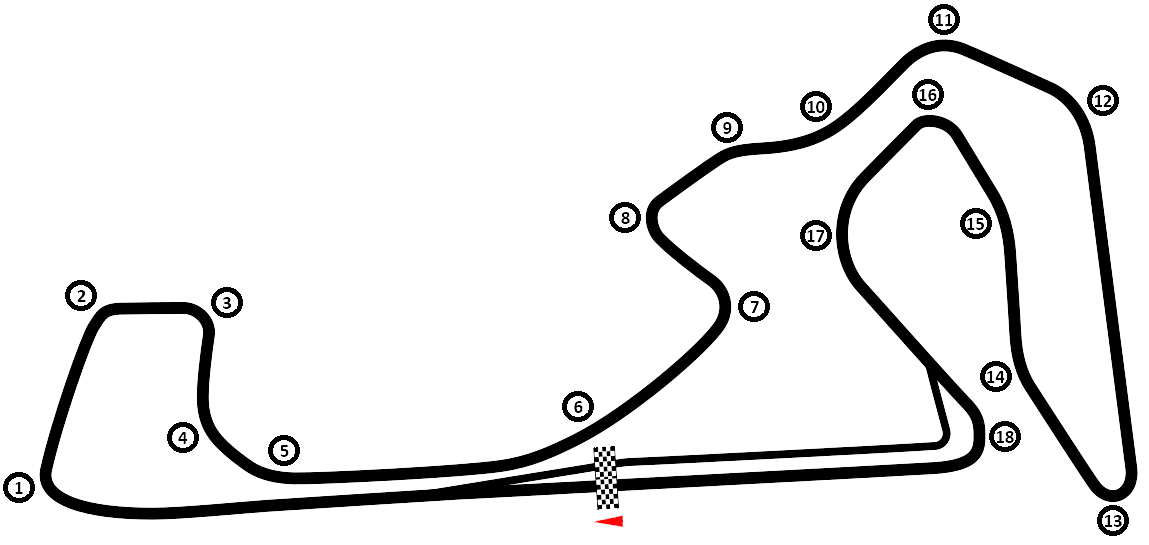
- Formula E Circuit (2022–2025)
- Location: Ancol, North Jakarta, Indonesia
- Coordinates: 6°7′6″S 106°51′31.4″E
- Capacity: 50,000
- FIA Grade: 3E
- Broke ground: January 2022; 4 years ago
- Opened: 4 June 2022; 4 years ago
- Construction cost: Rp 60 billion
- Architect: Irawan Sucahyono
- Major events: Future: FIA Rallycross World Cup (2026); Former: Formula E Jakarta ePrix (2022–2023, 2025)

Formula E Circuit (2022–2025)
- Surface: Asphalt
- Length: 2.370 km (1.473 mi)
- Turns: 18
- Race lap record: 1:07.453 ( (United Kingdom) Norman Nato, Nissan e-4ORCE 05, 2025, F-E)

Rallycross Circuit (2026)

The Jakarta International e-Prix Circuit (JIEC) is a 2.370 km (1.473 mi) racing circuit in Ancol, Jakarta, Indonesia. It was built for the Jakarta ePrix of the single-seater, electrically powered Formula E championship. The first edition of the Jakarta ePrix was held there on 4 June 2022, and the circuit's Formula E layout hosted the event in 2022, 2023 and 2025. After conversion to a mixed asphalt-and-gravel track, the circuit is scheduled to host the inaugural FIA Rallycross World Cup on 5–6 December 2026.

The circuit was designed by architect Irawan Sucahyono at a construction cost of around Rp 60 billion, and had a spectator capacity of about 50,000. It was largely purpose-built, combining two existing roads outside the Ancol Beach City mall with newly laid asphalt, but its layout was designed to evoke the feel of the street circuits used elsewhere on the Formula E calendar. The Formula E layout had 18 corners and was driven clockwise.

The circuit is on Ancol Beach, on Jakarta Bay, within an urban leisure park that normally draws tens of thousands of visitors a day. The circuit's development was intended to leave a lasting legacy for the city, help revive the Ancol Beach area, and support Jakarta's tourism recovery after the COVID-19 pandemic; city authorities also positioned the site as a potential hub for innovation as part of Indonesia's plan for a full transition to electric vehicles by 2050.

== History ==
=== Background ===
The proposal of the Jakarta ePrix was first announced in July 2019, with mid-2020 announced as the target date for an inaugural race. The originally intended location, the National Monument and the Merdeka Square, was rejected along with a proposal for the use of the Gelora Bung Karno Stadium. Five options were then proposed: Jenderal Sudirman Street, Indah Kapuk Beach, Jakarta International Expo, Jakarta International Stadium, and the Ancol region. The Ancol region was announced as the location on 22 December 2021, after approval from the FIA and Formula E Operations.

In January 2022, the Governor of Jakarta, Anies Baswedan, inaugurated the Jakarta International e-Prix Circuit, marking the start of construction. By March 2022, work was under way and had reached the track-paving stage; paving was completed the following month, and the circuit's supporting infrastructure, including fencing and boundary walls, was finished a week before the ePrix. All of the venue's supporting facilities were declared complete on 1 June 2022.

The circuit was built by the contractor PT Jaya Konstruksi Manggala Pratama and funded by PT Jakarta Propertindo (Jakpro), the regional government-owned company responsible for organising the Jakarta ePrix. Jakpro leased the land from PT Pembangunan Jaya Ancol on a business-to-business basis. On 27 May 2022, a week before the inaugural race, the roof of one of the circuit's nine grandstands collapsed during heavy rain and strong wind, which the organising committee chairman Ahmad Sahroni attributed to the storm. Formula E Operations said the roof would be rebuilt by 2 June.

=== Jakarta ePrix (2022–2023, 2025) ===
The inaugural Jakarta ePrix, held on 4 June 2022, was attended by Indonesian President Joko Widodo and Governor Anies Baswedan, and drew a combined crowd of more than 60,000 across the race and the surrounding festival. The race was won by Jaguar driver Mitch Evans after passing long-time leader Jean-Éric Vergne while Edoardo Mortara closed in from third.

The 2023 edition of the Jakarta ePrix was held as a doubleheader, in which German driver Pascal Wehrlein won Race 1 and Maximilian Günther won Race 2.

The Jakarta ePrix was not held in 2024, as the date would have coincided with the 2024 Indonesian presidential election. The event returned to the calendar on 21 June 2025 as a single race, won by Dan Ticktum of Cupra Kiro, ahead of Edoardo Mortara and Nico Müller. Norman Nato, who finished 14th, set the race's fastest lap, 1:07.453 on lap 35, which stands as the circuit's race lap record.

=== FIA Rallycross World Cup (2026) ===
On 10 March 2026, the FIA announced that Jakarta would host the inaugural FIA Rallycross World Cup on 5–6 December 2026. The event was created after the FIA discontinued the FIA World Rallycross Championship, and is the first time the discipline will be held in Southeast Asia. The event is organised in partnership with the Indonesian sports and entertainment company SARGA.CO.

To stage it, SARGA.CO and the Jakarta provincial administration are adapting the Formula E circuit into a rallycross track that combines asphalt with gravel sections. Construction was scheduled to run through November 2026.

== Layout ==
=== Formula E layout (2022–2025) ===
The Formula E layout had 18 corners and was driven clockwise. Its design was inspired by the Kuda lumping horse, and it featured a start/finish straight of 600 m (2,000 ft). Turn 1 was a wide right-hander with multiple racing lines that created overtaking opportunities, followed by two right-handers and two fast left-handers approaching the mall straight. The double left-right 90-degree turns after the mall straight were followed by a fast S-section leading into a straight. The Turn 13 hairpin was the hardest braking zone on the track, followed by a right-left kink. Turn 16 had widening and banking on the outside line to accommodate the attack-mode activation zone. The lap ended with a fast left-hander and a sharp right-hander. Formula E driver Lucas di Grassi described the track as "having a good mixture of low, medium and high-speed corners and will test every aspect of car performance."

Before the inaugural race, teams expected the track to be bumpy in places, with some undulation around Turn 7. After the race, several drivers praised the layout and the newly laid surface, and Stoffel Vandoorne said the asphalt did not break up in the heat. Tyre supplier Michelin said the surface was more abrasive than it had expected, in conditions of 33 °C (91 °F) and 70% humidity.

=== Rallycross layout (2026) ===
For the FIA Rallycross World Cup, the Formula E layout was adapted into a mixed-surface rallycross track made up of 60% tarmac and 40% gravel, which the FIA unveiled on 21 August 2026. The track includes a jump on the back straight, a banked second corner and a Joker Lap, an alternative route that drivers must take twice in every race at the World Cup.

== Access ==
The circuit is next to Ancol Beach on Jakarta Bay, with Soekarno–Hatta International Airport around a 30-minute drive to the west. As with most Formula E events, public transport was the recommended way to reach the venue for the Jakarta ePrix; private vehicles were permitted inside the circuit grounds only for holders of the Jakarta Royal Suite 1A ticket. Spectators holding Grandstand, Hospitality or Circuit Festival tickets could use free shuttle buses that ran to the circuit on race day from JIExpo Kemayoran. Holders of Festival Ancol tickets could enter through the south, west, Busway and Marina gates, though no parking was provided for them.

== Facilities ==
For the Jakarta ePrix, the venue included nine grandstands, five VIP suites, lodging and dining facilities, a recreation area, a media and press centre, and five semi-permanent pedestrian bridges.

Grandstands 2A–2E stood between Turns 14 and 16, overlooking a winding section of the track; Grandstand 2F was at Turn 17, Grandstand 2G at Turn 9, and Grandstand 2I at Turn 1. The five VIP suites comprised VIP 1A, on the straight leading into Turn 1; VIP 1B, between Turns 1 and 5; and VIP 1C, 1D and 1E, along the Ancol beachfront. Spectators entered through one of two gates: a western entrance for grandstand ticket holders and a southern entrance for VIP ticket holders. Five semi-permanent pedestrian bridges, located on the main straight and at Turns 4, 7, 8 and 17, allowed spectators to cross the track and move between vantage points.

== Lap records ==
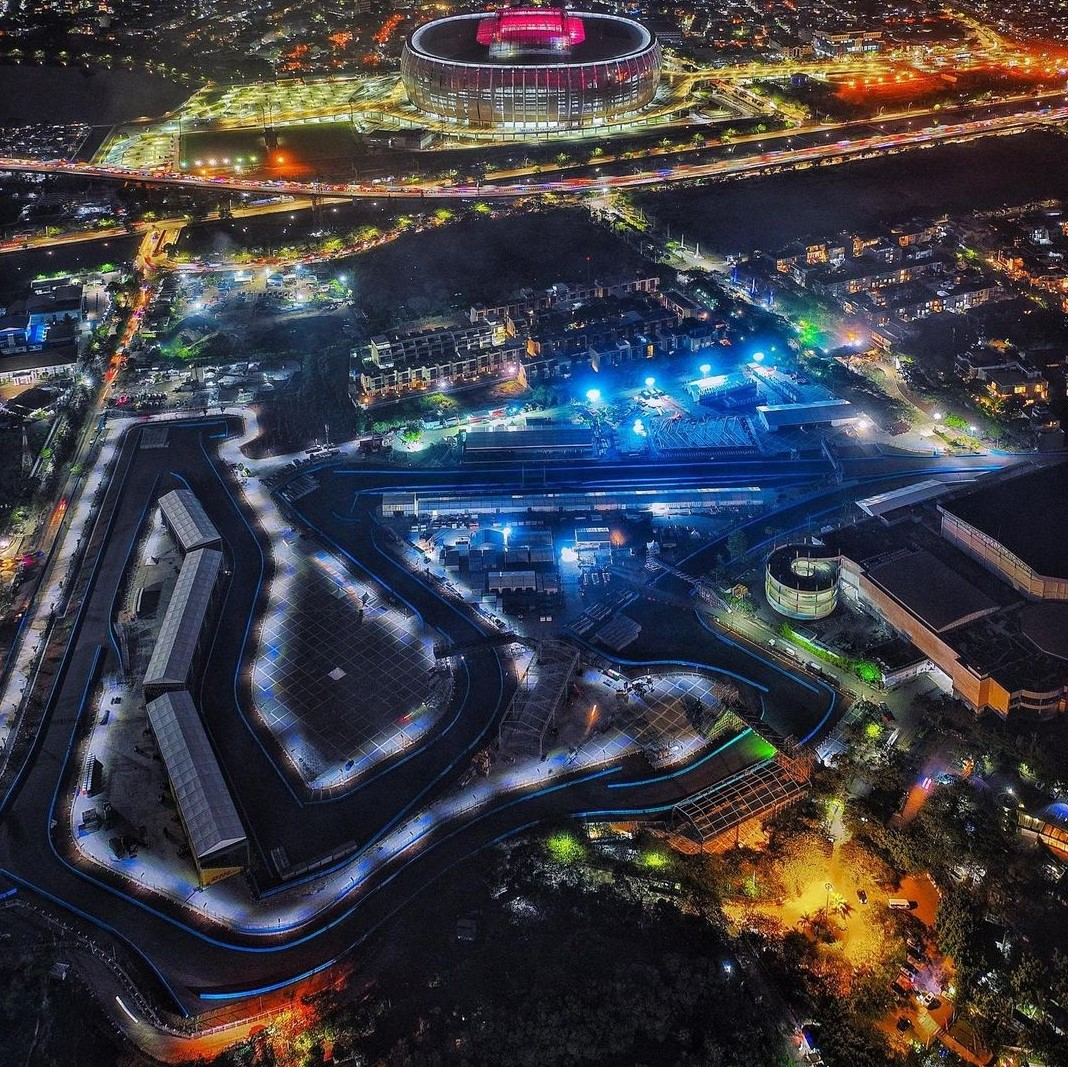
Night birdview of Jakarta International e-Prix circuit

Official lap records are set in a race, although qualifying laps are typically faster. The fastest qualifying lap of the 2025 Jakarta ePrix, 1:06.713, was set by Jake Dennis. As of October 2026, the fastest official race lap record at the Jakarta International e-Prix Circuit is listed as:

Category	Time	Driver	Vehicle	Event
Formula E Circuit: 2.370 km (2022–2025)
Formula E	1:07.453	Norman Nato	Nissan e-4ORCE 05	2025 Jakarta ePrix

== See also ==
- Jaya Ancol Circuit (Indonesia's first motor racing circuit, located adjacent to the e-Prix circuit)
- Mandalika International Street Circuit
- Sentul International Circuit
