= Ancol =

Administrative village in Jakarta, Indonesia

Coordinates: 6.129121°S 106.833350°E

Ancol Administrative Village Kelurahan Ancol
- Administrative village
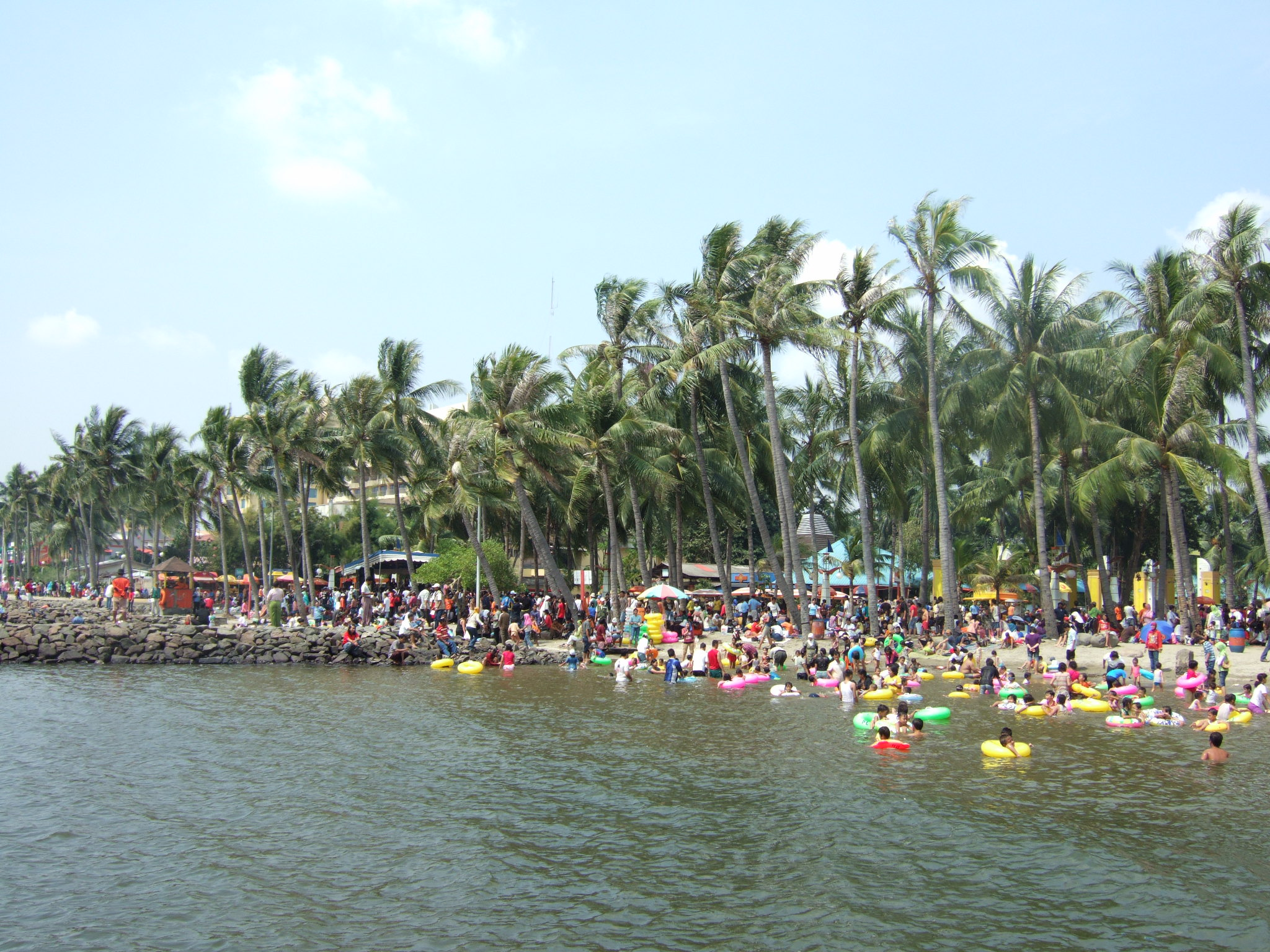
- Ancol Carnival Beach
- Interactive map of Ancol Administrative Village
- Country: Indonesia
- Province: Special Capital City District of Jakarta
- City: North Jakarta
- District: Pademangan

Area
  - Total: 5.77 km^{2} (2.23 sq mi)
- Postal code: 14430

Ancol (Old spelling: Antjol, Chinese: 安恤) is a coastal lowland area located to the east of Kota Tua Jakarta in northern Jakarta, in Indonesia. The coastal lowland stretched from Kota Tua Jakarta to the west and Tanjung Priok to the east. Today, Ancol contains the main beach resort of Jakarta. Taman Impian Jaya Ancol, the largest integrated tourism area in Southeast Asia, is located in Ancol.

Following the independence of Indonesia, Ancol was made one of the administrative village (kelurahan) of Pademangan Subdistrict in North Jakarta. The administrative village Ancol is bounded by Jakarta Bay to the north, Sunda Kelapa harbour to the west and Kali Japat canal to the east.

== Government ==
The Administrative Village of Ancol has a postal code of 14430.

== History ==
=== Pre-colonial period ===
The name Ancol refers to a river located around 3 km east of Sunda Kelapa harbour, and the area surrounding it. The mouth of the Ancol river was located where the area of Putri Duyung Cottage now located. The area surrounding the Ancol river was a coastal lowland, characterized with brackish bodies of water, mangrove forests and swamps.

The earliest mention of Ancol was in Koropak 406, a palm leaf manuscript written in the 16th century. It stated the attempt of the Sultanate of Banten, Cirebon, and Demak to siege Sunda Kelapa, and that the area of Ancol is considered one of the strategic place to attack the Sunda Kelapa harbour:

…Disilihan inya ku prebu Surawisesa, iny nu surup ka padaren, kasuran, kadiran, kuwamen. Prangrang lima welas kali hanteu eleh, ngalakukeun bala sariwu. Prangrang ka Kalapa deung Aaria burah. Prangrang ka Tanjung. Prangrang ka Ancol kiyi….

=== Arrival of the Europeans ===
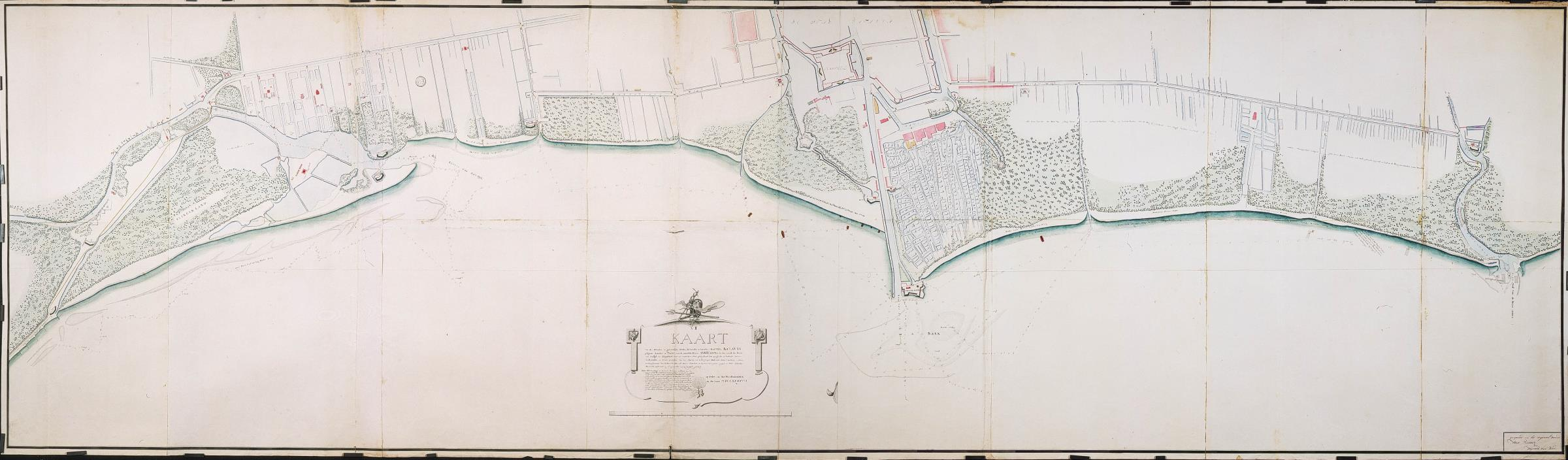
Coastal area of Batavia showing the River Ancol to the east (left of this image). Several villas were found along the Ancol Canal, which was built to connect the canals of Batavia to the River Ancol.

When the Portuguese arrived in the late 16th century, the Hindu Sunda Kingdom of Pakuan Pajajaran welcomed their arrival and hoped that the Portuguese would protect them from the attack by the Islamic Sultanate of Banten, Demak, and Cirebon. Despite their alliance, the three sultanates, under the leadership of Fatahillah, managed to defeat both the kingdom of Pakuan Pajajaran and the Portuguese by attacking the port from the east area coastal area of Ancol. Sunda Kelapa was renamed into Jayakarta.

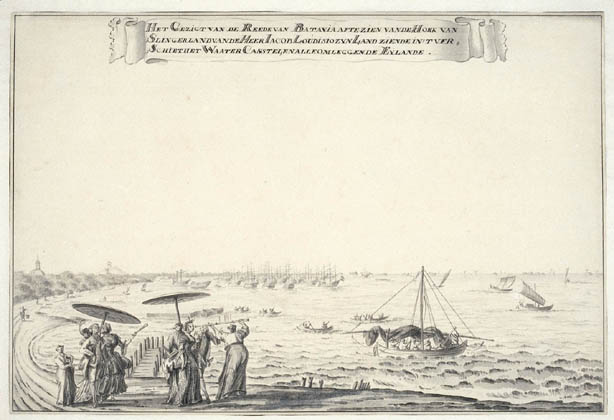
The Slingerland, to the east bank of the Ancol River, was a popular beach resort of the 18th century.

Later in the 17th century, the ruler of Jayakarta was defeated by the Dutch. The town was completely eradicated and a new fortified city, Batavia, was developed on the east bank of the Ciliwung. To control the water of Batavia, a system of canals were constructed to connect the canals of Batavia with nearby river: the Angke and the Ancol. The canal which connects Batavia with Ancol was named Antjolschevaart (Dutch "Ancol Canal"), has been established by 1650. Several forts and batteries were established to protect these canals, such as the Sconce Zouteland (Dutch "saline water") guarding the point where Ancol Canal meet River Ancol, which would later be upgraded into Fort Ancol in the 18th century. By the end of the 18th century, two batteries guarded the mouth of River Ancol, Slingerland to the east, Zeelucht to the west. Resort houses, such as the house of Adriaan Valckenier, were built along the Ancol Canal as a beach resort. The coastal area to the east bank of Ancol River, named Slingerland or Sanggerlang (now Ancol residential area), was a popular destination for the elites. The Chinese temple Da Bo Gong, built in 1650, was among the first building constructed in Ancol.

During the course of the 19th century, the old Batavia was gradually abandoned in favour of the much healthier and cleaner Weltevreden. During the period, Ancol remained undeveloped.

With the construction of a new port in Tanjung Priok in the late 19th century, the 200-year-old Ancol Canal was extended to reach Tanjung Priok. A new railway line was established along the Ancol Canal, connecting Batavia N.I.S. station with Tanjung Priok station. Despite the introduction of these new infrastructure, the area of Ancol remained devoid of any urban development.

=== World War II ===
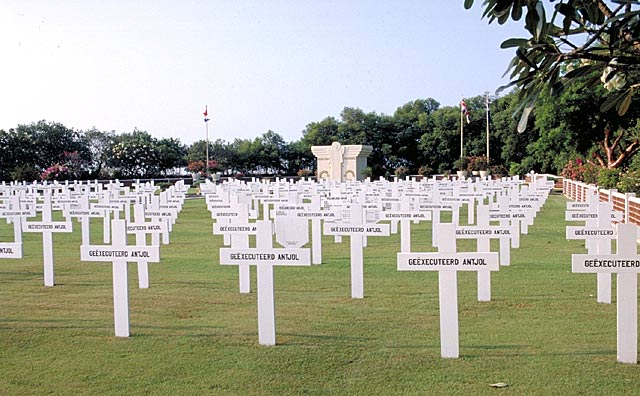
Dutch War Cemetery Ancol was created to bury the executed people during the Japanese occupation.

During the Japanese occupation, the swampy area of Ancol was used as a field of execution and mass grave for those who opposed the Japanese troops, mainly the Dutch. These victims were later reburied in a new cemetery on the coast of Ancol, Ancol War Cemetery, inaugurated on September 14, 1946. The cemetery, also known as the "cemetery of the executed", contains more than 2,000 victims of execution during the Japanese occupation, many of whom are unknown. Because of its proximity to the coast, the cemetery is threatened by seawater flooding.

=== Modern period ===
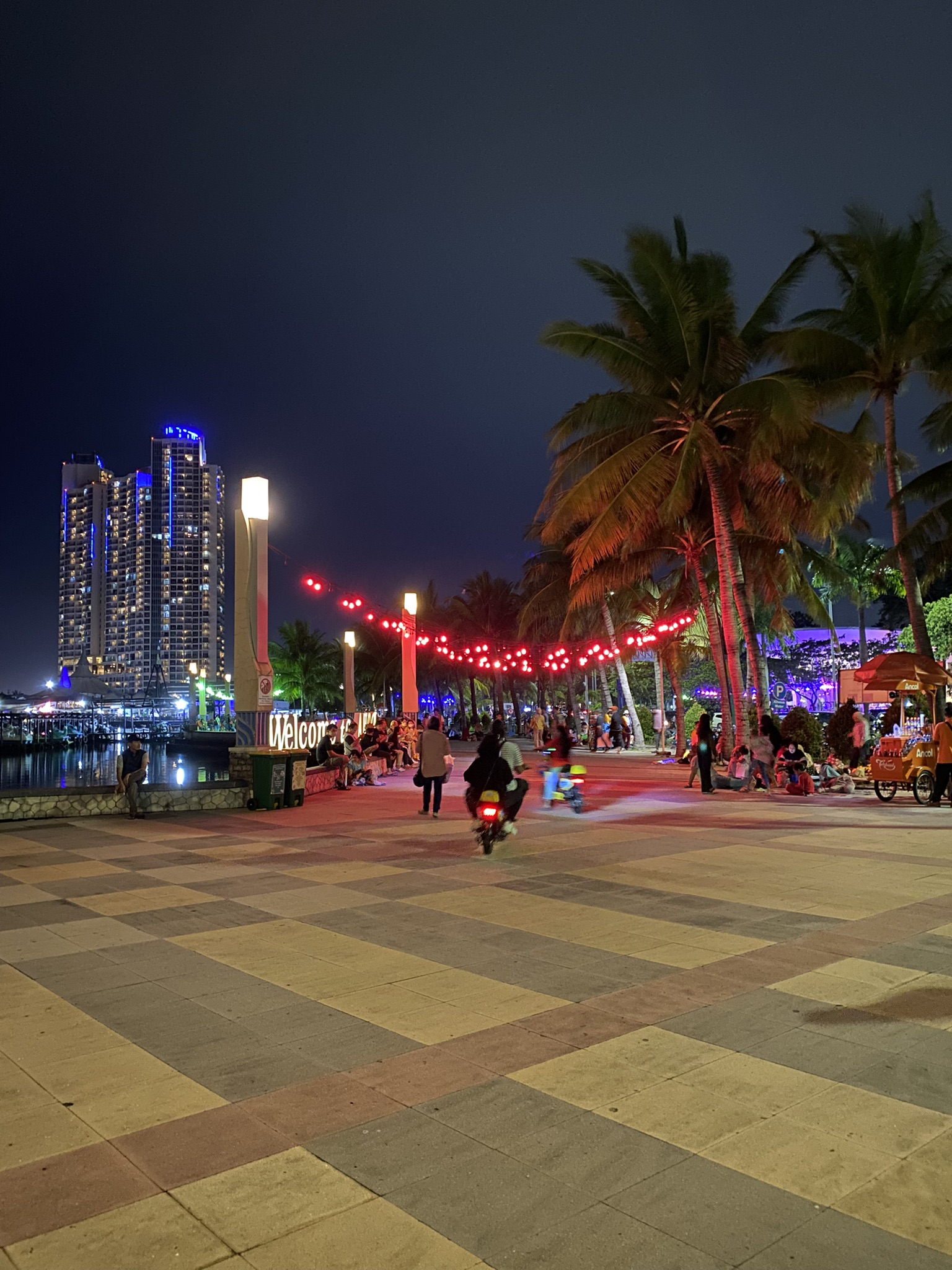
Ancol beach promenade at night

In 1960, Ancol remained undeveloped, mosquito-infested swamps and fish ponds. President Sukarno, known for initiating many monumental projects in Jakarta, would propose the idea of reclaiming the swamps and converting them into Jakarta's largest recreation and entertainment centre. This idea was finally initiated in 1965, an idea that opposed the first idea of developing Ancol into an industrial area.

The development was started during the governance of Ali Sadikin, the governor of Jakarta in 1966. The entertainment complex was named Taman Impian Jaya Ancol. The first facility was the Bina Ria Ancol beach, best known for its drive-in theater especially during the 1970s. The Dunia Fantasi theme park was built in 1984. Today, the 552 hectare recreation area is known as the Ancol Jakarta Bay City, contains hotels, cottages, beaches, a theme park, traditional market places, an oceanarium, a golf field and a marina, and Jakarta International e-Prix Circuit.

== Cited works ==
- Aca (1968). Carita Parahiyangan: naskah titilar karuhun urang Sunda abad ka-16 Maséhi. Yayasan Kabudayaan Nusalarang, Bandung.
- Merrillees, Scott (2015). Jakarta: Portraits of a Capital 1950-1980. Jakarta: Equinox Publishing. ISBN 9786028397308.
- Soekmono, R. (1988). Pengantar Sejarah Kebudayaan Indonesia 2, 2nd ed. Yogyakarta: Penerbit Kanisius.
