= 2021 Puebla ePrix =

Pair of Formula E electric car races

Race 8 of 15 of the 2020–21 Formula E season
← Previous race	Next race →

Race details
- Date: 19 June 2021
- Official name: 2021 CBMM Niobium Puebla E-Prix
- Location: Autódromo Miguel E. Abed, Amozoc, Puebla
- Course: Permanent racing facility
- Course length: 2.982 km (1.853 mi)
- Distance: 28 laps, 82.040 km (50.977 mi)

Pole position
Driver	(Germany) Pascal Wehrlein	Porsche
- Time: 1:23.780

Fastest lap
Driver	(United Kingdom) Oliver Rowland (Germany) René Rast (Note: Rast received the point for fastest lap as Rowland failed to finish in the top 10.)	e.dams-Nissan; Audi
- Time: 1:25.172 (1:25.531) on lap 23 (25)

Podium
First	(Brazil) Lucas di Grassi	Audi
Second	(Germany) René Rast	Audi
Third	(Switzerland) Edoardo Mortara	Venturi-Mercedes

2021 Puebla ePrix
Race 9 of 15 of the 2020–21 Formula E season
← Previous race	Next race →

Race details
- Date: 20 June 2021
- Official name: 2021 CBMM Niobium Puebla E-Prix
- Location: Autódromo Miguel E. Abed, Amozoc, Puebla
- Course: Permanent racing facility
- Course length: 2.982 km (1.853 mi)
- Distance: 32 laps, 93.760 km (58.260 mi)

Pole position
Driver	(United Kingdom) Oliver Rowland	e.dams-Nissan
- Time: 1:23.579

Fastest lap
Driver	(Germany) René Rast	Audi
- Time: 1:25.370 on lap 22

Podium
First	(Switzerland) Edoardo Mortara	Venturi-Mercedes
Second	(New Zealand) Nick Cassidy	Virgin-Audi
Third	(United Kingdom) Oliver Rowland	e.dams-Nissan

The 2021 Puebla ePrix (formally the 2021 CBMM Niobium Puebla E-Prix) was a pair of Formula E electric car races held at the Autódromo Miguel E. Abed in the town of Amozoc near Puebla, Mexico on 19 and 20 June 2021. With usual Mexico City ePrix venue Autódromo Hermanos Rodríguez being used as a temporary hospital for COVID-19 patients, a replacement had to be found, making this the inaugural running of a competitive Formula E event at the track, and the sixth in the country. It marked the eighth and ninth rounds of the 2020–21 Formula E season.

The first race was won by Lucas di Grassi ahead of his teammate René Rast and Edoardo Mortara, after pole-sitter and original race winner Pascal Wehrlein was disqualified due to a technical infraction. Edoardo Mortara won the second race to claim the championship lead, with Nick Cassidy and Oliver Rowland rounding out the podium.

== Classification ==
=== Race one ===
==== Qualifying ====
Group draw
Group 1	(Netherlands) FRI (1)	(Netherlands) DEV (2)	(New Zealand) EVA (3)	(Portugal) DAC (4)	(United Kingdom) BIR (5)	(Belgium) VAN (6)
Group 2	(France) JEV (7)	(Germany) RAS (8)	(United Kingdom) ROW (9)	(United Kingdom) DEN (10)	(Switzerland) MOR (11)	(Germany) WEH (12)
Group 3	(United Kingdom) SIM (14)	(United Kingdom) LYN (15)	(Germany) GUE (16)	(New Zealand) CAS (17)	(Germany) LOT (18)	(Brazil) DIG (19)
Group 4	(United Kingdom) TUR (20)	(Brazil) SET (21)	(Switzerland) BUE (22)	(France) NAT (23)	(United Kingdom) BLO (24)	(Sweden) ERI (–)

Pos.	No.	Driver	Team	GS	SP	Grid
1	99	(Germany) Pascal Wehrlein	Porsche	1:23.505	1:23.780	1
2	22	(United Kingdom) Oliver Rowland	e.dams-Nissan	1:23.808	1:23.838	2
3	27	(United Kingdom) Jake Dennis	Andretti-BMW	1:23.886	1:23.879	3
4	25	(France) Jean-Éric Vergne	Techeetah-DS	1:23.996	1:24.282	4
5	28	(Germany) Maximilian Günther	Andretti-BMW	1:24.072	1:25.095	5
6	48	(Switzerland) Edoardo Mortara	Venturi-Mercedes	1:24.286	1:27.217	6
7	29	(United Kingdom) Alexander Sims	Mahindra	1:24.425	—N/a	7
8	11	(Brazil) Lucas di Grassi	Audi	1:24.489	—N/a	8
9	7	(Brazil) Sérgio Sette Câmara	Dragon-Penske	1:24.706	—N/a	24^{1}
10	33	(Germany) René Rast	Audi	1:24.818	—N/a	9
11	36	(Germany) André Lotterer	Porsche	1:24.832	—N/a	10
12	13	(Portugal) António Félix da Costa	Techeetah-DS	1:24.881	—N/a	11
13	20	(New Zealand) Mitch Evans	Jaguar	1:24.934	—N/a	12
14	6	(Sweden) Joel Eriksson	Dragon-Penske	1:24.992	—N/a	23^{1}
15	37	(New Zealand) Nick Cassidy	Virgin-Audi	1:25.352	—N/a	13
16	17	(Netherlands) Nyck de Vries	Mercedes	1:25.387	—N/a	14
17	8	(United Kingdom) Oliver Turvey	NIO	1:25.404	—N/a	15
18	94	(United Kingdom) Alex Lynn	Mahindra	1:25.593	—N/a	16
19	71	(France) Norman Nato	Venturi-Mercedes	1:25.730	—N/a	17
20	10	(United Kingdom) Sam Bird	Jaguar	1:25.788	—N/a	18
21	23	(Switzerland) Sébastien Buemi	e.dams-Nissan	1:25.809	—N/a	19
22	4	(Netherlands) Robin Frijns	Virgin-Audi	1:26.146	—N/a	20
23	5	(Belgium) Stoffel Vandoorne	Mercedes	1:26.413	—N/a	21
24	88	(United Kingdom) Tom Blomqvist	NIO	1:30.568	—N/a	22

Notes:

- ^1 – Joel Eriksson and Sérgio Sette Câmara received a 20-place grid penalty each for changing the inverters in their Dragon / Penske Autosport cars. As they didn't qualify high enough to drop all 20 positions, they had to serve a drive-through penalty at the start of the race.

==== Race ====
Pos.	No.	Driver	Team	Laps	Time/Retired	Grid	Points
1	11	(Brazil) Lucas di Grassi	Audi	28	47:40.772	8	25
2	33	(Germany) René Rast	Audi	28	+0.497	9	18+1^{1}
3	48	(Switzerland) Edoardo Mortara	Venturi-Mercedes	28	+2.774	6	15
4	29	(United Kingdom) Alexander Sims	Mahindra	28	+10.443	7	12
5	27	(United Kingdom) Jake Dennis	Andretti-BMW	28	+11.473	3	10
6	13	(Portugal) António Félix da Costa	Techeetah-DS	28	+11.624	11	8
7	5	(Belgium) Stoffel Vandoorne	Mercedes	28	+12.022	21	6
8	20	(New Zealand) Mitch Evans	Jaguar	28	+12.351	12	4
9	17	(Netherlands) Nyck de Vries	Mercedes	28	+12.936	14	2
10	94	(United Kingdom) Alex Lynn	Mahindra	28	+13.154	16	1
11	8	(United Kingdom) Oliver Turvey	NIO	28	+14.548	15	
12	28	(Germany) Maximilian Günther	Andretti-BMW	28	+15.257	5	
13	88	(United Kingdom) Tom Blomqvist	NIO	28	+15.442	22	
14	71	(France) Norman Nato	Venturi-Mercedes	28	+15.756	17	
15	7	(Brazil) Sérgio Sette Câmara	Dragon-Penske	28	+16.971	24	
16	4	(Netherlands) Robin Frijns	Virgin-Audi	28	+17.942	20	
17	6	(Sweden) Joel Eriksson	Dragon-Penske	28	+18.285	23	
Ret	10	(United Kingdom) Sam Bird	Jaguar	15	Collision damage	18	
Ret	25	(France) Jean-Éric Vergne	Techeetah-DS	12	Collision damage	4	
Ret	37	(New Zealand) Nick Cassidy	Virgin-Audi	0	Accident	13	
DSQ	99	(Germany) Pascal Wehrlein	Porsche	28	Disqualified^{3}	1	3+1^{2}
DSQ	36	(Germany) André Lotterer	Porsche	28	Disqualified^{3}	10	
DSQ	23	(Switzerland) Sébastien Buemi	e.dams-Nissan	28	Disqualified^{3}	19	
DSQ	22	(United Kingdom) Oliver Rowland	e.dams-Nissan	24	Disqualified^{3}	2	

Notes:

- ^1 – Fastest lap.
- ^2 – Pole position; fastest in group stage.
- ^3 – Both Porsche and both Nissan e.dams cars were disqualified due to a technical infraction. Wehrlein, Lotterer and Buemi originally finished 1st, 16th and 18th, while Rowland had retired in the pits. Wehrlein retained points earned for pole position and for fastest in the group stage.

==== Standings after the race ====
Drivers' Championship standings

+/–	Pos	Driver	Points
	1	(Netherlands) Robin Frijns	62
2	2	(Portugal) António Félix da Costa	60
1	3	(Netherlands) Nyck de Vries	59
4	4	(Germany) René Rast	58
2	5	(New Zealand) Mitch Evans	58

Teams' Championship standings

+/–	Pos	Constructor	Points
	1	(Germany) Mercedes	113
	2	(United Kingdom) Jaguar	107
	3	(China) Techeetah-DS	106
2	4	(Germany) Audi	97
1	5	(United Kingdom) Virgin-Audi	81

- Notes: Only the top five positions are included for both sets of standings.

=== Race two ===
==== Qualifying ====
Group draw
Group 1	(Netherlands) FRI (1)	(Portugal) DAC (2)	(Netherlands) DEV (3)	(Germany) RAS (4)	(New Zealand) EVA (5)	(Belgium) VAN (6)
Group 2	(United Kingdom) BIR (7)	(Switzerland) MOR (8)	(France) JEV (9)	(United Kingdom) DEN (10)	(Brazil) DIG (11)	(United Kingdom) SIM (12)
Group 3	(Germany) WEH (13)	(United Kingdom) ROW (14)	(United Kingdom) LYN (16)	(Germany) GUE (17)	(New Zealand) CAS (18)	(Germany) LOT (19)
Group 4	(United Kingdom) TUR (20)	(Brazil) SET (21)	(Switzerland) BUE (22)	(France) NAT (23)	(United Kingdom) BLO (24)	(Sweden) ERI (25)

Pos.	No.	Driver	Team	GS	SP	Grid
1	22	(United Kingdom) Oliver Rowland	e.dams-Nissan	1:23.052	1:23.579	1
2	99	(Germany) Pascal Wehrlein	Porsche	1:23.227	1:23.771	2
3	48	(Switzerland) Edoardo Mortara	Venturi-Mercedes	1:23.235	1:23.886	3
4	25	(France) Jean-Éric Vergne	Techeetah-DS	1:23.204	1:23.950	4
5	27	(United Kingdom) Jake Dennis	Andretti-BMW	1:22.816	1:24.154	5
6	94	(United Kingdom) Alex Lynn	Mahindra	1:23.212	no time	6
7	23	(Switzerland) Sébastien Buemi	e.dams-Nissan	1:23.455	—N/a	7
8	37	(New Zealand) Nick Cassidy	Virgin-Audi	1:23.499	—N/a	8
9	88	(United Kingdom) Tom Blomqvist	NIO	1:23.583	—N/a	9
10	36	(Germany) André Lotterer	Porsche	1:23.636	—N/a	10
11	28	(Germany) Maximilian Günther	Andretti-BMW	1:23.640	—N/a	11
12	71	(France) Norman Nato	Venturi-Mercedes	1:23.789	—N/a	12
13	11	(Brazil) Lucas di Grassi	Audi	1:23.984	—N/a	13
14	29	(United Kingdom) Alexander Sims	Mahindra	1:24.179	—N/a	14
15	10	(United Kingdom) Sam Bird	Jaguar	1:24.292	—N/a	15
16	7	(Brazil) Sérgio Sette Câmara	Dragon-Penske	1:24.445	—N/a	16
17	5	(Belgium) Stoffel Vandoorne	Mercedes	1:24.736	—N/a	17
18	20	(New Zealand) Mitch Evans	Jaguar	1:24.756	—N/a	18
19	17	(Netherlands) Nyck de Vries	Mercedes	1:24.811	—N/a	19
20	8	(United Kingdom) Oliver Turvey	NIO	1:24.840	—N/a	20
21	4	(Netherlands) Robin Frijns	Virgin-Audi	1:24.907	—N/a	21
22	13	(Portugal) António Félix da Costa	Techeetah-DS	1:24.911	—N/a	22
23	6	(Sweden) Joel Eriksson	Dragon-Penske	1:25.203	—N/a	23
24	33	(Germany) René Rast	Audi	no time	—N/a	24

==== Race ====
Pos.	No.	Driver	Team	Laps	Time/Retired	Grid	Points
1	48	(Switzerland) Edoardo Mortara	Venturi-Mercedes	32	46:41.685	3	25
2	37	(New Zealand) Nick Cassidy	Virgin-Audi	32	+4.169	8	18
3	22	(United Kingdom) Oliver Rowland	e.dams-Nissan	32	+6.912	1	15+3^{1}
4	99	(Germany) Pascal Wehrlein	Porsche	32	+7.296^{4}	2	12
5	27	(United Kingdom) Jake Dennis	Andretti-BMW	32	+9.986	5	10+1^{2}
6	94	(United Kingdom) Alex Lynn	Mahindra	32	+10.630	6	8
7	28	(Germany) Maximilian Günther	Andretti-BMW	32	+10.968	11	6
8	25	(France) Jean-Éric Vergne	Techeetah-DS	32	+21.111	4	4
9	20	(New Zealand) Mitch Evans	Jaguar	32	+21.261	18	2
10	33	(Germany) René Rast	Audi	32	+21.896	24	1+1^{3}
11	4	(Netherlands) Robin Frijns	Virgin-Audi	32	+22.216	21	
12	10	(United Kingdom) Sam Bird	Jaguar	32	+27.945	15	
13	5	(Belgium) Stoffel Vandoorne	Mercedes	32	+28.578	17	
14	23	(Switzerland) Sébastien Buemi	e.dams-Nissan	32	+35.720	7	
15	6	(Sweden) Joel Eriksson	Dragon-Penske	32	+41.027	23	
16	7	(Brazil) Sérgio Sette Câmara	Dragon-Penske	32	+41.029^{5}	16	
17	36	(Germany) André Lotterer	Porsche	32	+46.250	10	
18	11	(Brazil) Lucas di Grassi	Audi	32	+1:26.473	13	
Ret	88	(United Kingdom) Tom Blomqvist	NIO	29	Suspension/Accident	9	
Ret	13	(Portugal) António Félix da Costa	Techeetah-DS	25	Accident	22	
Ret	29	(United Kingdom) Alexander Sims	Mahindra	21	Collision damage	14	
Ret	8	(United Kingdom) Oliver Turvey	NIO	16	Technical	20	
Ret	71	(France) Norman Nato	Venturi-Mercedes	12	Collision damage	12	
Ret	17	(Netherlands) Nyck de Vries	Mercedes	8	Collision damage	19	

Notes:

- ^1 – Pole position.
- ^2 – Fastest in group stage.
- ^3 – Fastest lap.
- ^4 – Pascal Wehrlein received a post-race 5-second time penalty for an improper use of the Fanboost.
- ^5 – Sérgio Sette Câmara received a 5-second time penalty for causing a collision.

==== Standings after the race ====
Drivers' Championship standings

+/–	Pos	Driver	Points
7	1	(Switzerland) Edoardo Mortara	72
1	2	(Netherlands) Robin Frijns	62
1	3	(Portugal) António Félix da Costa	60
	4	(Germany) René Rast	60
	5	(New Zealand) Mitch Evans	60

Teams' Championship standings

+/–	Pos	Constructor	Points
	1	(Germany) Mercedes	113
1	2	(China) Techeetah-DS	110
1	3	(United Kingdom) Jaguar	109
	4	(Germany) Audi	99
	5	(United Kingdom) Virgin-Audi	99

- Notes: Only the top five positions are included for both sets of standings.

== Notes ==
Previous race: 2021 Monaco ePrix	FIA Formula E World Championship; 2020–21 season	Next race: 2021 New York City ePrix
Previous race: N/A	Puebla ePrix	Next race: N/A
