= 2020–21 Formula E World Championship =

Electric car racing season

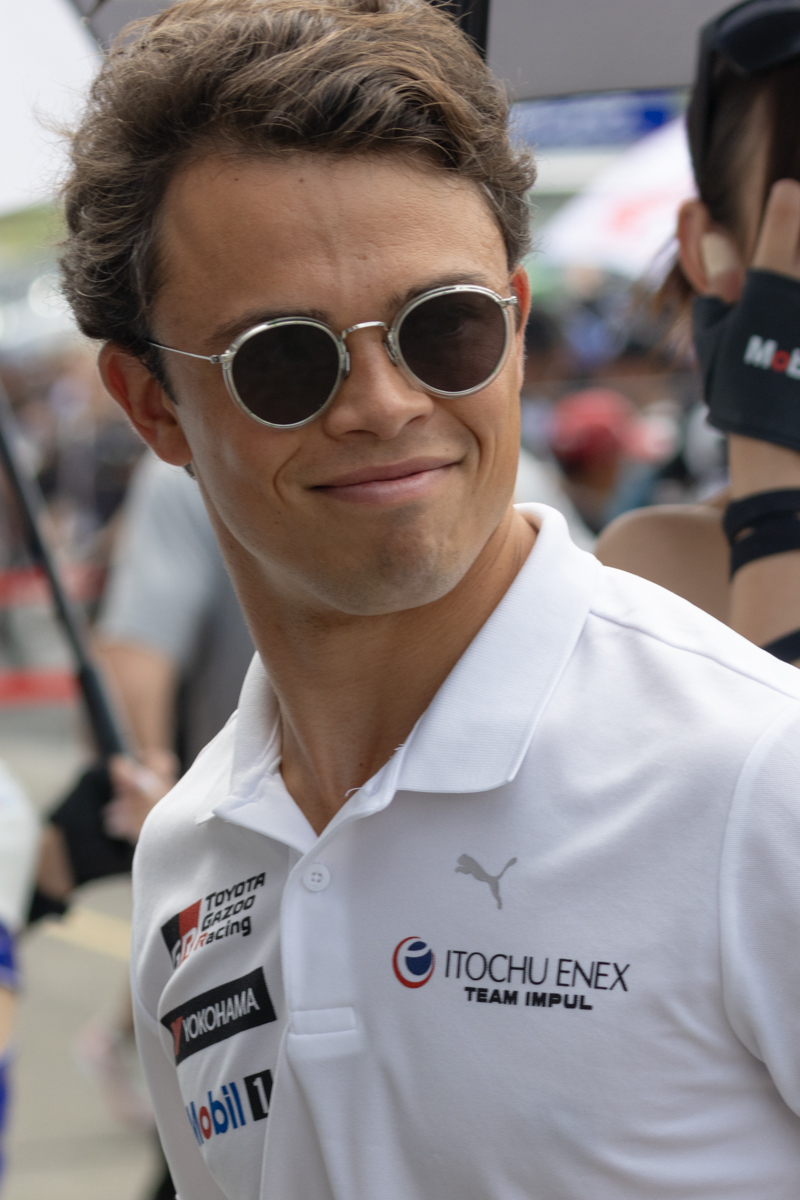
Nyck de Vries (pictured in 2024) secured his first Drivers' Championship at the Berlin ePrix.

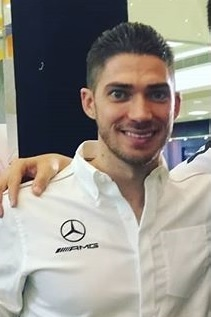
Edoardo Mortara was runner-up, driving for Venturi Racing.

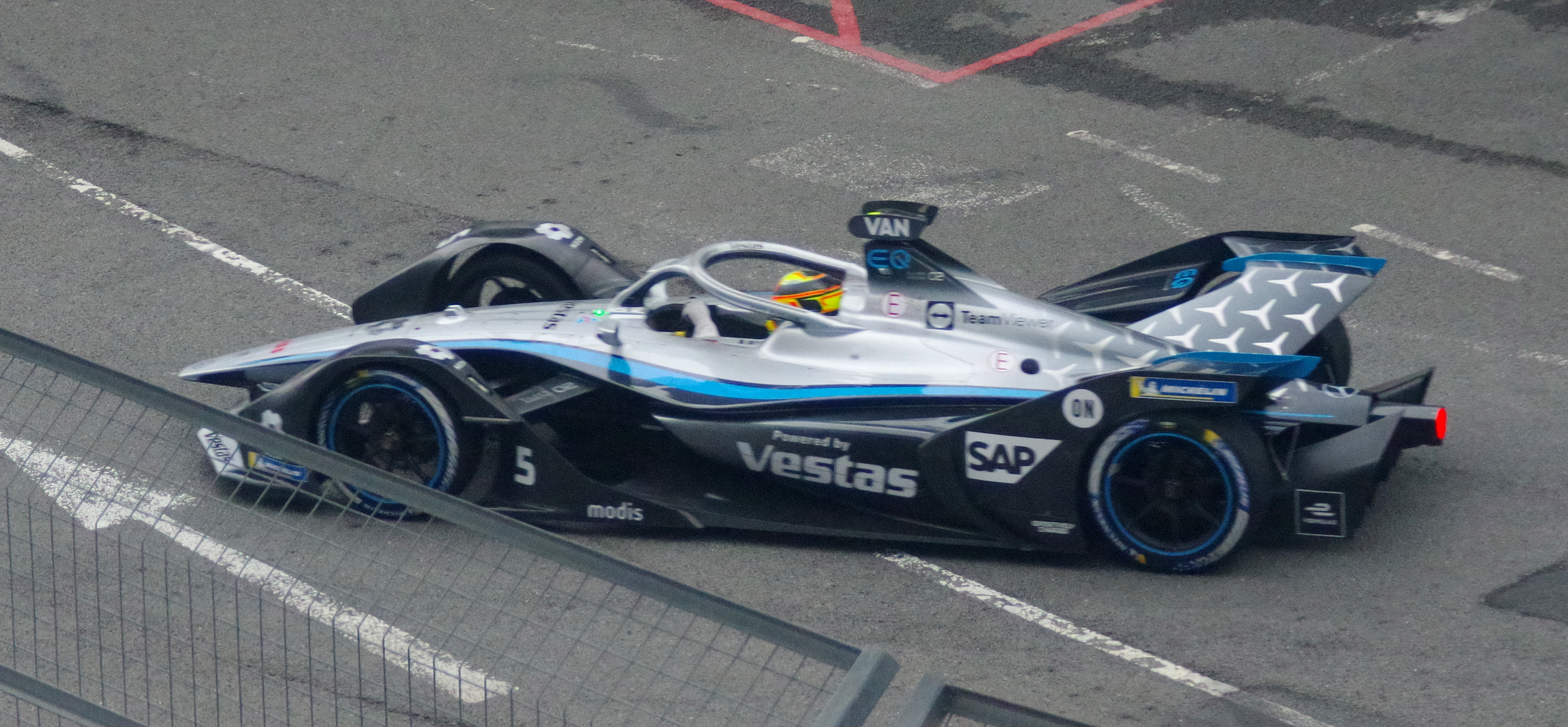
Mercedes secured their first Teams' Championship.

The 2020–21 ABB FIA Formula E World Championship was the seventh season of the FIA Formula E championship, a motor racing championship for battery-electric cars recognised by motorsport's governing body, the Fédération Internationale de l'Automobile (FIA), as the highest class of competition for electric open-wheel racing cars.

With the 2020–21 season, the championship officially became a FIA World Championship, joining Formula One, the World Endurance Championship, the World Rally Championship, and the World Rallycross Championship.

The facelift of the Spark Gen2 car, called the Gen2 EVO, was supposed to debut in this season, but was delayed due to the COVID-19 pandemic, and eventually cancelled in favor of the Gen3 car.

The drivers' championship was won by Nyck de Vries, driving for Mercedes-EQ, while Mercedes won their first teams' championship.

== Teams and drivers ==
Team	Powertrain	No.	Drivers	Rounds
(United Kingdom) Envision Virgin Racing	Audi e-tron FE07	4	(Netherlands) Robin Frijns	All
(United Kingdom) Envision Virgin Racing	Audi e-tron FE07	37	(New Zealand) Nick Cassidy	All
(Germany) Mercedes-EQ Formula E Team	Mercedes-EQ Silver Arrow 02	5	(Belgium) Stoffel Vandoorne	All
(Germany) Mercedes-EQ Formula E Team	Mercedes-EQ Silver Arrow 02	17	(Netherlands) Nyck de Vries	All
(United States) Dragon / Penske Autosport	Penske EV-4 (Note: Dragon / Penske Autosport, (Note: Dragon / Penske Autosport switched to a new powertrain at the 2021 Monaco ePrix.) DS Techeetah (Note: DS Techeetah switched to a new powertrain at the 2021 Rome ePrix.) and Nissan e.dams (Note: Nissan e.dams switched to a new powertrain at the 2021 Monaco ePrix.) opted to start the season with their 2019–20 powertrains and would introduce new models later into the season.); Penske EV-5	6	(Switzerland) Nico Müller	1–7
(United States) Dragon / Penske Autosport	Penske EV-4; Penske EV-5	6	(Sweden) Joel Eriksson	8–15
(United States) Dragon / Penske Autosport	Penske EV-4; Penske EV-5	7	(Brazil) Sérgio Sette Câmara	All
(China) Nio 333 FE Team	NIO 333 001 (Note: NIO 333 refers to the powertrain manufacturer, not to confused with NIO, the car company.)	8	(United Kingdom) Oliver Turvey	All
(China) Nio 333 FE Team	NIO 333 001	88	(United Kingdom) Tom Blomqvist	All
(United Kingdom) Jaguar Racing	Jaguar I-Type 5	10	(United Kingdom) Sam Bird	All
(United Kingdom) Jaguar Racing	Jaguar I-Type 5	20	(New Zealand) Mitch Evans	All
(Germany) Audi Sport ABT Schaeffler Formula E Team	Audi e-tron FE07	11	(Brazil) Lucas di Grassi	All
(Germany) Audi Sport ABT Schaeffler Formula E Team	Audi e-tron FE07	33	(Germany) René Rast	All
(China) DS Techeetah	DS E-Tense FE20; DS E-Tense FE21	13	(Portugal) António Félix da Costa	All
(China) DS Techeetah	DS E-Tense FE20; DS E-Tense FE21	25	(France) Jean-Éric Vergne	All
(France) Nissan e.dams	Nissan IM02; Nissan IM03	22	(United Kingdom) Oliver Rowland	All
(France) Nissan e.dams	Nissan IM02; Nissan IM03	23	(Switzerland) Sébastien Buemi	All
(United States) BMW i Andretti Motorsport	BMW iFE.21	27	(United Kingdom) Jake Dennis	All
(United States) BMW i Andretti Motorsport	BMW iFE.21	28	(Germany) Maximilian Günther	All
(India) Mahindra Racing	Mahindra M7Electro	29	(United Kingdom) Alexander Sims	All
(India) Mahindra Racing	Mahindra M7Electro	94	(United Kingdom) Alex Lynn	All
(Germany) TAG Heuer Porsche Formula E Team	Porsche 99X Electric (Note: Porsche started the season with a new powertrain, but decided to carry over the name from the previous model.)	36	(Germany) André Lotterer	All
(Germany) TAG Heuer Porsche Formula E Team	Porsche 99X Electric	99	(Germany) Pascal Wehrlein	All
(Monaco) ROKiT Venturi Racing	Mercedes-EQ Silver Arrow 02	48	(Switzerland) Edoardo Mortara	All
(Monaco) ROKiT Venturi Racing	Mercedes-EQ Silver Arrow 02	71	(France) Norman Nato	All

=== Driver changes ===
- Sam Bird and Virgin chose to part ways at the end of season six. He moved to Jaguar, replacing James Calado.
- Nick Cassidy joined Virgin to replace Sam Bird, after driving for them in the 2020 Rookie Test in Marrakesh.
- Felipe Massa left Venturi after two seasons with the team.
- René Rast was promoted to permanent driver for Audi. He had competed in the previous season's final six races in Berlin, replacing a dismissed Daniel Abt.
- Pascal Wehrlein joined TAG Heuer Porsche, replacing Neel Jani.
- Alexander Sims left BMW i Andretti Motorsport to join Mahindra Racing, replacing Jérôme d'Ambrosio, who left after 2 years with the team. Sims was joined at the team by fellow Brit Alex Lynn.
- Norman Nato joined ROKiT Venturi Racing, replacing Felipe Massa.
- Jake Dennis joined BMW i Andretti Motorsport, replacing Alexander Sims.
- Jérôme d'Ambrosio left Mahindra Racing and retired from competitive racing to become Venturi deputy team principal.
- Sérgio Sette Câmara was signed by Dragon / Penske Autosport on a permanent basis, after competing in the final six races of 2020 for the team.
- Tom Blomqvist replaced Daniel Abt at NIO 333.

=== Mid-season changes ===
- Nico Müller left the series due to several clashing commitments. Joel Eriksson took his place for the remainder of the season.

== Calendar ==
A first provisional calendar for the 2020–21 season was announced in June 2020. In October, the calendar was altered with the races in Mexico City and Sanya postponed from their original dates in February and March respectively, while a second race was added to the season opener in Santiago in January. No reason was given for the change. On 28 January FIA Formula E published a revised calendar for the first part of the season with the addition of an event at the Circuit Ricardo Tormo in Valencia, the return to the calendar of the Marrakesh ePrix, which was originally set to be discontinued, and the cancellation of the Season 7 running of the Paris ePrix due to the COVID-19 pandemic. Formula E also confirmed the events scheduled for Sanya and Seoul were unable to take place as originally scheduled, and both were eventually cancelled along with Marrakesh and Santiago.

Round	ePrix	Country	Circuit	Date
1	Diriyah ePrix	Saudi Arabia	Riyadh Street Circuit	26 February 2021
2	Diriyah ePrix	Saudi Arabia	Riyadh Street Circuit	27 February 2021
3	Rome ePrix	Italy	Circuito Cittadino dell'EUR	10 April 2021
4	Rome ePrix	Italy	Circuito Cittadino dell'EUR	11 April 2021
5	Valencia ePrix	Spain	Circuit Ricardo Tormo	24 April 2021
6	Valencia ePrix	Spain	Circuit Ricardo Tormo	25 April 2021
7	Monaco ePrix	Monaco	Circuit de Monaco	8 May 2021
8	Puebla ePrix	Mexico	Autódromo Miguel E. Abed	19 June 2021
9	Puebla ePrix	Mexico	Autódromo Miguel E. Abed	20 June 2021
10	New York City ePrix	United States	Brooklyn Street Circuit	10 July 2021
11	New York City ePrix	United States	Brooklyn Street Circuit	11 July 2021
12	London ePrix	United Kingdom	ExCeL London (Note: The circuit is designed as an indoor-outdoor venue, combining the ExCeL facilities and the surrounding public roads at Royal Docks.)	24 July 2021
13	London ePrix	United Kingdom	ExCeL London	25 July 2021
14	Berlin ePrix I	Germany	Tempelhof Airport Street Circuit (Note: Round 15 used a reversed track layout from round 14.)	14 August 2021
15	Berlin ePrix II	Germany	Tempelhof Airport Street Circuit	15 August 2021

=== ePrix locations ===
Location of non-European ePrix in 2021.
(held ePrix)
Location of European ePrix in 2021.
(held ePrix)

=== Calendar changes ===
- The Diriyah ePrix was moved from November to February. It became the first Formula E race held at night.
- The Rome and Sanya ePrix were expected to return to the calendar, as their 2020 races were cancelled due to the COVID-19 pandemic. Only Rome was actually held, this time as a double-header, while Sanya was once again cancelled, as was the Paris ePrix.
- The Monaco ePrix returned to the calendar, as it is held every 2 years. For the first time, the Grand Prix Circuit was used.
- The Santiago ePrix was to become the first round of the season as a double-header, being held behind closed doors. However, the round was later postponed in December 2020 owing to increased COVID-19 restrictions in the United Kingdom. It was rescheduled to June, still a double-header. The race was eventually cancelled on 22 April 2021.
- The Valencia ePrix made its debut on the calendar, taking place at the Circuit Ricardo Tormo, which had previously hosted pre-season testing for Formula E.
- The Seoul ePrix was due to make its debut on the calendar. The race had been included on the provisional 2019–20 calendar, but was cancelled in response to the COVID-19 pandemic. The event was cancelled again on 22 April 2021.
- The Mexico City ePrix was cancelled in favor of the brand new Puebla ePrix. The event was a double race event at a permanent circuit, the Autódromo Miguel E. Abed in Amozoc de Mota, Puebla, 120 km southeast of Mexico City, as the Autódromo Hermanos Rodríguez (also a permanent circuit) was still being used as a field hospital.
- The New York City ePrix was confirmed to return as it would become a double-header once more. It was meant to become a single race event in 2020, but the race was cancelled due to the COVID-19 pandemic.
- The London ePrix returned to the calendar after a 5-year absence, using a new track layout based in the ExCeL arena. It was originally included on the 2019–20 calendar, but was cancelled due to the COVID-19 pandemic. It also became a double race event.
- The Berlin ePrix was confirmed to return and was to be a double-header once more after holding the final 6 races of the 2019–20 season due to the effects of the COVID-19 pandemic. Before the event, the format was changed so that the event would use two different layouts, making it two separate events in the process.

== Regulation changes ==
=== Technical regulations ===
Manufacturers will now only be able to modify powertrain components once over the next two seasons as part of an extended homologation period, with teams having the option to either introduce a new powertrain for the 2020–21 season for a two-year runout or continue with their current systems for next season before homologating a new set-up for a single season the year after.

== Results and standings ==
=== ePrix ===
Round	Race	Qualifying		Race			Report
Round	Race	Group stage	Pole position	Fastest lap	Winning driver	Winning team	Report
1	(Saudi Arabia) Diriyah	(Netherlands) Nyck de Vries	(Netherlands) Nyck de Vries	(Belgium) Stoffel Vandoorne (Note: Stoffel Vandoorne set the fastest lap, but had done so while in Fanboost, so was ineligible to be the point-scorer for the fastest lap. René Rast was the point-scorer instead for setting the fastest lap of those finishing in the top 10.)	(Netherlands) Nyck de Vries	(Germany) Mercedes-EQ Formula E Team	Report
2	(Saudi Arabia) Diriyah	(Netherlands) Robin Frijns	(Netherlands) Robin Frijns	(Netherlands) Nyck de Vries	(United Kingdom) Sam Bird	(United Kingdom) Jaguar Racing	Report
3	(Italy) Rome	(United Kingdom) Oliver Rowland	(Belgium) Stoffel Vandoorne	(New Zealand) Mitch Evans	(France) Jean-Éric Vergne	(China) DS Techeetah	Report
4	(Italy) Rome	(France) Norman Nato	(New Zealand) Nick Cassidy	(Netherlands) Nyck de Vries (Note: Nyck de Vries set the fastest lap, but did not finish in the top 10, so was ineligible to be the point-scorer for the fastest lap. Stoffel Vandoorne was the point-scorer instead for setting the fastest lap of those finishing in the top 10.)	(Belgium) Stoffel Vandoorne	(Germany) Mercedes-EQ Formula E Team	Report
5	(Spain) Valencia	(United Kingdom) Alex Lynn	(Portugal) António Félix da Costa	(Netherlands) Robin Frijns	(Netherlands) Nyck de Vries	(Germany) Mercedes-EQ Formula E Team	Report
6	(Spain) Valencia	(United Kingdom) Jake Dennis	(United Kingdom) Jake Dennis	(United Kingdom) Alexander Sims (Note: Alexander Sims set the fastest lap, but did not finish in the top 10, so was ineligible to be the point-scorer for the fastest lap. Alex Lynn was the point-scorer instead for setting the fastest lap of those finishing in the top 10.)	(United Kingdom) Jake Dennis	(United States) BMW i Andretti Motorsport	Report
7	Monaco	(Netherlands) Robin Frijns	(Portugal) António Félix da Costa	(Belgium) Stoffel Vandoorne (Note: Stoffel Vandoorne set the fastest lap, but did not finish in the top 10, so was ineligible to be the point-scorer for the fastest lap. Jean-Éric Vergne was the point-scorer instead for setting the fastest lap of those finishing in the top 10.)	(Portugal) António Félix da Costa	(China) DS Techeetah	Report
8	(Mexico) Puebla	(Germany) Pascal Wehrlein	(Germany) Pascal Wehrlein	(United Kingdom) Oliver Rowland (Note: Oliver Rowland set the fastest lap, but did not finish in the top 10, so was ineligible to be the point-scorer for the fastest lap. René Rast was the point-scorer instead for setting the fastest lap of those finishing in the top 10.)	(Brazil) Lucas di Grassi (Note: Pascal Wehrlein and TAG Heuer Porsche Formula E Team were the initial winners but were disqualified for a technical infraction.)	(Germany) Audi Sport ABT Schaeffler Formula E Team	Report
9	(Mexico) Puebla	(United Kingdom) Jake Dennis	(United Kingdom) Oliver Rowland	(Germany) René Rast	(Switzerland) Edoardo Mortara	(Monaco) ROKiT Venturi Racing	Report
10	(United States) New York City	(Switzerland) Sébastien Buemi	(New Zealand) Nick Cassidy	(France) Norman Nato (Note: Norman Nato set the fastest lap, but did not finish in the top 10, so was ineligible to be the point-scorer for the fastest lap. Sam Bird was the point-scorer instead for setting the fastest lap of those finishing in the top 10.)	(Germany) Maximilian Günther	(United States) BMW i Andretti Motorsport	Report
11	(United States) New York City	(United Kingdom) Sam Bird	(United Kingdom) Sam Bird	(New Zealand) Mitch Evans (Note: Mitch Evans set the fastest lap, but did not finish in the top 10, so was ineligible to be the point-scorer for the fastest lap. António Félix da Costa was the point-scorer instead for setting the fastest lap of those finishing in the top 10.)	(United Kingdom) Sam Bird	(United Kingdom) Jaguar Racing	Report
12	(United Kingdom) London	(Germany) André Lotterer	(United Kingdom) Alex Lynn	(New Zealand) Mitch Evans (Note: Mitch Evans set the fastest lap, but did not finish in the top 10, so was ineligible to be the point-scorer for the fastest lap. René Rast was the point-scorer instead for setting the fastest lap of those finishing in the top 10.)	(United Kingdom) Jake Dennis	(United States) BMW i Andretti Motorsport	Report
13	(United Kingdom) London	(United Kingdom) Alex Lynn	(Belgium) Stoffel Vandoorne	(Netherlands) Robin Frijns	(United Kingdom) Alex Lynn	(India) Mahindra Racing	Report
14	(Germany) Berlin I	(France) Jean-Éric Vergne	(France) Jean-Éric Vergne	(Germany) René Rast	(Brazil) Lucas di Grassi	(Germany) Audi Sport ABT Schaeffler Formula E Team	Report
15	(Germany) Berlin II	(Belgium) Stoffel Vandoorne	(Belgium) Stoffel Vandoorne	(Brazil) Lucas di Grassi (Note: Lucas di Grassi set the fastest lap, but did not finish in the top 10, so was ineligible to be the point-scorer for the fastest lap. René Rast was the point-scorer instead for setting the fastest lap of those finishing in the top 10.)	(France) Norman Nato	(Monaco) ROKiT Venturi Racing	Report

=== Drivers' Championship ===
Points were awarded using the following structure:

Position	1st	2nd	3rd	4th	5th	6th	7th	8th	9th	10th	GS	Pole	FL
Points	25	18	15	12	10	8	6	4	2	1	1	3	1

Pos.	Driver	DIR (Saudi Arabia)		RME (Italy)		VLC (Spain)		MCO (Monaco)	PUE (Mexico)		NYC (United States)		LDN (United Kingdom)		BER (Germany)	BER (Germany)	Pts
1	(Netherlands) Nyck de Vries	**1**^{G}*	9*	Ret*	Ret*	1	16*	Ret*	9*	Ret*	13*	18*	2*	2*	22*	8*	99
2	(Switzerland) Edoardo Mortara	2	DNS	Ret	4	Ret	9	12	3	1	14	17	9	11	2	Ret	92
3	(United Kingdom) Jake Dennis	12*	Ret	Ret	13	8	**1**^{G}	16	5	5^{G}	Ret	16	1	9	5	Ret	91
4	(New Zealand) Mitch Evans	3	Ret	3	6	Ret	15	3	8	9	Ret	13	14	3	3	Ret*	90
5	(Netherlands) Robin Frijns	17	**2**^{G}	4	18	6	19	2^{G}	16	11	5	8	13	4	15	12	89
6	(United Kingdom) Sam Bird	Ret	1	2*	Ret*	DSQ*	14	7*	Ret*	12	9*	**1**^{G}*	Ret*	Ret*	Ret*	7	87
7	(Brazil) Lucas di Grassi	9*	8*	Ret	Ret	7*	10*	10	1*	18*	3	14*	6	DSQ	1	20*	87
8	(Portugal) António Félix da Costa	11*	3*	Ret*	7*	**DSQ***	22*	**1***	6*	Ret*	12*	3*	8*	Ret*	7	Ret*	86
9	(Belgium) Stoffel Vandoorne	8*	13*	**Ret***	1*	3*	Ret*	Ret*	7*	13*	Ret*	12*	7*	**15***	12*	**3**^{G}*	82
10	(France) Jean-Éric Vergne	15	12	1	11	9	7	4*	Ret	8	2*	Ret	12*	12	**6**^{G}	11	80
11	(Germany) Pascal Wehrlein	5	10	7	3	Ret	18	Ret	**DSQ**^{G}	4*	Ret	4	10	5	21	6	79
12	(United Kingdom) Alex Lynn	Ret	Ret	8	17	DSQ^{G}	3	9	10	6	11	9	**3**	1^{G}*	20*	13	78
13	(Germany) René Rast	4	17	6	Ret	5	6	Ret	2	10	10	20	5	Ret	9	9	78
14	(United Kingdom) Oliver Rowland	6	7	12^{G}	16	DSQ	4	6	DSQ	**3**	7	19	DSQ	18	13	2	77
15	(New Zealand) Nick Cassidy	19	14	15	**Ret**	4*	13*	8	Ret	2	**4**	2	11	7	14	17	76
16	(Germany) Maximilian Günther	Ret	Ret	9	5	Ret	12	5	12	7	1	10	18	6	8	15	66
17	(Germany) André Lotterer	16	11	14	15	Ret	2	17	DSQ	17	8	5	4^{G}	17	10	4	58
18	(France) Norman Nato	14	16	11	DSQ^{G}	NC	5	13	14	Ret	15	7	NC	Ret	4	1	54
19	(United Kingdom) Alexander Sims	7	15	Ret	2	DSQ	23	Ret	4	Ret	Ret	6	Ret	16	17*	5	54
20	(Switzerland) Nico Müller	21	5	13	9	2	20	18									30
21	(Switzerland) Sébastien Buemi	13	Ret	5	10	Ret	11	11	DSQ	14	6^{G}	15	DSQ	13	11	14	20
22	(Brazil) Sérgio Sette Câmara	20	4*	16*	12*	Ret	21	15	15	16	18	11	17	8	18	18	16
23	(United Kingdom) Oliver Turvey	10	6	DNS	14	NC	8	19	11	Ret	Ret	Ret	15	14	19	19	13
24	(United Kingdom) Tom Blomqvist	18	18	10	8	NC	17	14	13	Ret	16	21	NC	19	NC	10	6
25	(Sweden) Joel Eriksson								17	15	17	22	16	10	16	16	1
Pos.	Driver	DIR (Saudi Arabia)		RME (Italy)		VLC (Spain)		MCO (Monaco)	PUE (Mexico)		NYC (United States)		LDN (United Kingdom)		BER (Germany)	BER (Germany)	Pts

Colour	Result
Gold	Winner
Silver	Second place
Bronze	Third place
Green	Points classification
Blue	Non-points classification
Blue	Non-classified finish (NC)
Purple	Retired, not classified (Ret)
Red	Did not qualify (DNQ)
Red	Did not pre-qualify (DNPQ)
Black	Disqualified (DSQ)
White	Did not start (DNS)
White	Withdrew (WD)
White	Race cancelled (C)
Blank	Did not practice (DNP)
Blank	Did not arrive (DNA)
Blank	Excluded (EX)

**Bold** – Pole
Italics – Fastest lap
^{G} – Fastest in group stage
* – FanBoost

=== Teams' Championship ===
Pos.	Team	No.	DIR (Saudi Arabia)		RME (Italy)		VLC (Spain)		MCO (Monaco)	PUE (Mexico)		NYC (United States)		LDN (United Kingdom)		BER (Germany)	BER (Germany)	Pts
1	(Germany) Mercedes-EQ Formula E Team	5	8	13	**Ret**	1	3	Ret	Ret	7	13	Ret	12	7	**15**	12	**3**^{G}	181
1	(Germany) Mercedes-EQ Formula E Team	17	**1**^{G}	9	Ret	Ret	1	16	Ret	9	Ret	13	18	2	2	22	8	181
2	(United Kingdom) Jaguar Racing	10	Ret	1	2	Ret	DSQ	14	7	Ret	12	9	**1**^{G}	Ret	Ret	Ret	7	177
2	(United Kingdom) Jaguar Racing	20	3	Ret	3	6	Ret	15	3	8	9	Ret	13	14	3	3	Ret	177
3	(China) DS Techeetah	13	11	3	Ret	7	**DSQ**	22	**1**	6	Ret	12	3	8	Ret	7	Ret	166
3	(China) DS Techeetah	25	15	12	1	11	9	7	4	Ret	8	2	Ret	12	12	**6**^{G}	11	166
4	(Germany) Audi Sport ABT Schaeffler Formula E Team	11	9	8	Ret	Ret	7	10	10	1	18	3	14	6	DSQ	1	20	165
4	(Germany) Audi Sport ABT Schaeffler Formula E Team	33	4	17	6	Ret	5	6	Ret	2	10	10	20	5	Ret	9	9	165
5	(United Kingdom) Envision Virgin Racing	4	17	**2**^{G}	4	18	6	19	2^{G}	16	11	5	8	13	4	15	12	165
5	(United Kingdom) Envision Virgin Racing	37	19	14	15	**Ret**	4	13	8	Ret	2	**4**	2	11	7	14	17	165
6	(United States) BMW i Andretti Motorsport	27	12	Ret	Ret	13	8	**1**^{G}	16	5	5^{G}	Ret	16	1	9	5	Ret	157
6	(United States) BMW i Andretti Motorsport	28	Ret	Ret	9	5	Ret	12	5	12	7	1	10	18	6	8	15	157
7	(Monaco) ROKiT Venturi Racing	48	2	DNS	Ret	4	Ret	9	12	3	1	14	17	9	11	2	Ret	146
7	(Monaco) ROKiT Venturi Racing	71	14	16	11	DSQ^{G}	NC	5	13	14	Ret	15	7	NC	Ret	4	1	146
8	(Germany) TAG Heuer Porsche Formula E Team	36	16	11	14	15	Ret	2	17	DSQ	17	8	5	4^{G}	17	10	4	137
8	(Germany) TAG Heuer Porsche Formula E Team	99	5	10	7	3	Ret	18	Ret	**DSQ**^{G}	4	Ret	4	10	5	21	6	137
9	(India) Mahindra Racing	29	7	15	Ret	2	DSQ	23	Ret	4	Ret	Ret	6	Ret	16	17	5	132
9	(India) Mahindra Racing	94	Ret	Ret	8	17	DSQ^{G}	3	9	10	6	11	9	**3**	1^{G}	20	13	132
10	(France) Nissan e.dams	22	6	7	12^{G}	16	DSQ	4	6	DSQ	**3**	7	19	DSQ	18	13	2	97
10	(France) Nissan e.dams	23	13	Ret	5	10	Ret	11	11	DSQ	14	6^{G}	15	DSQ	13	11	14	97
11	(United States) Dragon / Penske Autosport	6	21	5	13	9	2	20	18	17	15	17	22	16	10	16	16	47
11	(United States) Dragon / Penske Autosport	7	20	4	16	12	Ret	21	15	15	16	18	11	17	8	18	18	47
12	(China) Nio 333 FE Team	8	10	6	DNS	14	NC	8	19	11	Ret	Ret	Ret	15	14	19	19	19
12	(China) Nio 333 FE Team	88	18	18	10	8	NC	17	14	13	Ret	16	21	NC	19	NC	10	19
Pos.	Team	No.	DIR (Saudi Arabia)		RME (Italy)		VLC (Spain)		MCO (Monaco)	PUE (Mexico)		NYC (United States)		LDN (United Kingdom)		BER (Germany)	BER (Germany)	Pts
