= 2021 Monaco ePrix =

Race 7 of 15 of the 2020–21 Formula E season
← Previous race	Next race →
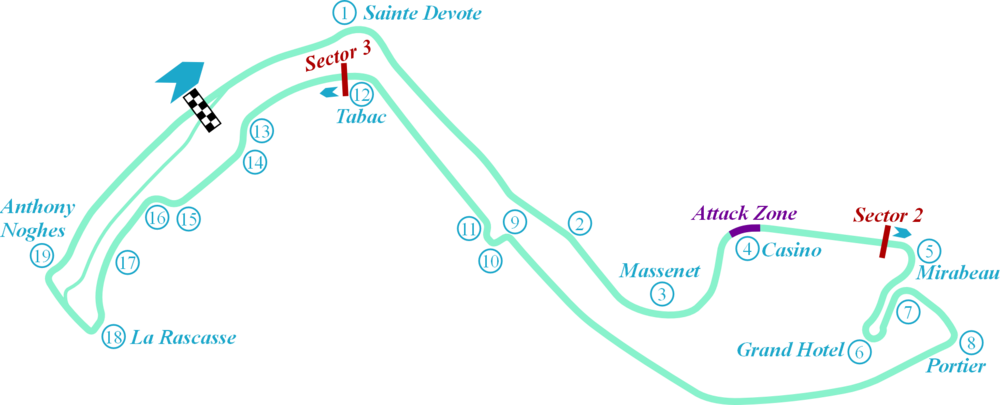

Race details
- Date: 8 May 2021
- Official name: 2021 Monaco E-Prix
- Location: Circuit de Monaco, Monte Carlo, Monaco
- Course: Street circuit
- Course length: 3.318 km (2.062 mi)
- Distance: 26 laps, 86.268 km (53.604 mi)

Pole position
Driver	(Portugal) António Félix da Costa	Techeetah-DS
- Time: 1:31.317

Fastest lap
Driver	(Belgium) Stoffel Vandoorne (France) Jean-Éric Vergne (Note: Vergne received the point for fastest lap as Vandoorne failed to finish in the top 10.)	Mercedes; Techeetah-DS
- Time: 1:34.428 (1:34.697) on lap 17 (13)

Podium
First	(Portugal) António Félix da Costa	Techeetah-DS
Second	(Netherlands) Robin Frijns	Virgin-Audi
Third	(New Zealand) Mitch Evans	Jaguar

The 2021 Monaco ePrix was a Formula E electric car race held at the Circuit de Monaco on 8 May 2021. It marked the seventh round of the 2020–21 Formula E season, as well as the fourth edition of the biennial event, albeit with a significantly modified layout resembling the one used in Formula One. António Félix da Costa won the race from pole, with Robin Frijns and Mitch Evans rounding out the podium.

== Classification ==
=== Qualifying ===
Group draw
Group 1	(Netherlands) DEV (1)	(Belgium) VAN (2)	(United Kingdom) BIR (3)	(Netherlands) FRI (4)	(New Zealand) EVA (5)	(Germany) RAS (6)
Group 2	(France) JEV (7)	(United Kingdom) DEN (8)	(Switzerland) MOR (9)	(Germany) WEH (10)	(Switzerland) MUL (11)	(United Kingdom) ROW (12)
Group 3	(United Kingdom) SIM (13)	(Portugal) DAC (14)	(United Kingdom) LYN (15)	(Germany) LOT (16)	(New Zealand) CAS (17)	(United Kingdom) TUR (18)
Group 4	(Brazil) DIG (19)	(Brazil) SET (20)	(Germany) GUE (21)	(Switzerland) BUE (22)	(France) NAT (23)	(United Kingdom) BLO (24)

Pos.	No.	Driver	Team	GS	SP	Grid
1	13	(Portugal) António Félix da Costa	Techeetah-DS	1:31.832	1:31.317	1
2	4	(Netherlands) Robin Frijns	Virgin-Audi	1:31.638	1:31.329	2
3	20	(New Zealand) Mitch Evans	Jaguar	1:31.772	1:31.368	3
4	25	(France) Jean-Éric Vergne	Techeetah-DS	1:31.839	1:31.376	4
5	28	(Germany) Maximilian Günther	Andretti-BMW	1:31.817	1:32.039	5
6	22	(United Kingdom) Oliver Rowland	e.dams-Nissan	1:31.850	no time	6
7	37	(New Zealand) Nick Cassidy	Virgin-Audi	1:31.853	—N/a	7
8	99	(Germany) Pascal Wehrlein	Porsche	1:31.900	—N/a	8
9	94	(United Kingdom) Alex Lynn	Mahindra	1:31.952	—N/a	9
10	71	(France) Norman Nato	Venturi-Mercedes	1:31.964	—N/a	12^{1}
11	33	(Germany) René Rast	Audi	1:32.125	—N/a	10
12	29	(United Kingdom) Alexander Sims	Mahindra	1:32.146	—N/a	11
13	23	(Switzerland) Sébastien Buemi	e.dams-Nissan	1:32.209	—N/a	13
14	27	(United Kingdom) Jake Dennis	Andretti-BMW	1:32.247	—N/a	14
15	5	(Belgium) Stoffel Vandoorne	Mercedes	1:32.277	—N/a	15
16	10	(United Kingdom) Sam Bird	Jaguar	1:32.281	—N/a	16
17	11	(Brazil) Lucas di Grassi	Audi	1:32.303	—N/a	17
18	48	(Switzerland) Edoardo Mortara	Venturi-Mercedes	1:32.329	—N/a	18
19	36	(Germany) André Lotterer	Porsche	1:32.339	—N/a	19
20	6	(Switzerland) Nico Müller	Dragon-Penske	1:32.344	—N/a	20
21	88	(United Kingdom) Tom Blomqvist	NIO	1:32.630	—N/a	21
22	8	(United Kingdom) Oliver Turvey	NIO	1:32.633	—N/a	22
23	17	(Netherlands) Nyck de Vries	Mercedes	1:33.070	—N/a	24^{2}
24	7	(Brazil) Sérgio Sette Câmara	Dragon-Penske	no time	—N/a	23

Notes:

- ^1 – Norman Nato received a two-place grid penalty for failing to respect a double-waved yellow flag in free practice 1.
- ^2 – Nyck de Vries received a 40-place grid penalty for changing the powerbox and the gearbox. As he qualified 23rd and could only drop one position, he had to serve a 10-second stop-go penalty at the start of the race.

=== Race ===
Pos.	No.	Driver	Team	Laps	Time/Retired	Grid	Points
1	13	(Portugal) António Félix da Costa	Techeetah-DS	26	47:20.697	1	25+3^{1}
2	4	(Netherlands) Robin Frijns	Virgin-Audi	26	+2.848	2	18+1^{2}
3	20	(New Zealand) Mitch Evans	Jaguar	26	+2.872	3	15
4	25	(France) Jean-Éric Vergne	Techeetah-DS	26	+3.120	4	12+1^{3}
5	28	(Germany) Maximilian Günther	Andretti-BMW	26	+3.270	5	10
6	22	(United Kingdom) Oliver Rowland	e.dams-Nissan	26	+3.865	6	8
7	10	(United Kingdom) Sam Bird	Jaguar	26	+4.150	16	6
8	37	(New Zealand) Nick Cassidy	Virgin-Audi	26	+4.752	7	4
9	94	(United Kingdom) Alex Lynn	Mahindra	26	+5.759	9	2
10	11	(Brazil) Lucas di Grassi	Audi	26	+6.225	17	1
11	23	(Switzerland) Sébastien Buemi	e.dams-Nissan	26	+6.567	13	
12	48	(Switzerland) Edoardo Mortara	Venturi-Mercedes	26	+7.097	18	
13	71	(France) Norman Nato	Venturi-Mercedes	26	+8.507	12	
14	88	(United Kingdom) Tom Blomqvist	NIO	26	+9.240	21	
15	7	(Brazil) Sérgio Sette Câmara	Dragon-Penske	26	+9.499	23	
16	27	(United Kingdom) Jake Dennis	Andretti-BMW	26	+9.822	14	
17	36	(Germany) André Lotterer	Porsche	26	+10.503^{4}	19	
18	6	(Switzerland) Nico Müller	Dragon-Penske	26	+11.450	20	
19	8	(United Kingdom) Oliver Turvey	NIO	26	+12.067	22	
Ret	17	(Netherlands) Nyck de Vries	Mercedes	23	Electrical	24	
Ret	5	(Belgium) Stoffel Vandoorne	Mercedes	21	Collision damage	15	
Ret	99	(Germany) Pascal Wehrlein	Porsche	21	Collision damage	8	
Ret	33	(Germany) René Rast	Audi	18	Accident	10	
Ret	29	(United Kingdom) Alexander Sims	Mahindra	0	Collision damage	11	

Notes:

- ^1 – Pole position.
- ^2 – Fastest in group stage.
- ^3 – Fastest lap.
- ^4 – André Lotterer received a post-race 5-second time penalty for causing a collision.

==== Standings after the race ====
Drivers' Championship standings

+/–	Pos	Driver	Points
3	1	(Netherlands) Robin Frijns	62
1	2	(Netherlands) Nyck de Vries	57
2	3	(New Zealand) Mitch Evans	54
10	4	(Portugal) António Félix da Costa	52
2	5	(United Kingdom) Sam Bird	49

Teams' Championship standings

+/–	Pos	Constructor	Points
	1	(Germany) Mercedes	105
	2	(United Kingdom) Jaguar	103
1	3	(China) Techeetah-DS	98
1	4	(United Kingdom) Virgin-Audi	81
3	5	(United States) BMW i Andretti	55

- Notes: Only the top five positions are included for both sets of standings.

== Notes ==
Previous race: 2021 Valencia ePrix	FIA Formula E World Championship; 2020–21 season	Next race: 2021 Puebla ePrix
Previous race: 2019 Monaco ePrix	Monaco ePrix	Next race: 2022 Monaco ePrix
