= 2021 Valencia ePrix =

Race 5 of 15 of the 2020–21 Formula E season
← Previous race	Next race →

Race details
- Date: 24 April 2021
- Official name: 2021 DHL Valencia E-Prix
- Location: Circuit Ricardo Tormo, Cheste, Valencia
- Course: Permanent racing facility
- Course length: 3.376 km (2.098 mi)
- Distance: 24 laps, 81.024 km (50.346 mi)
- Weather: Wet, 15 °C (59 °F). Humidity: 84%.

Pole position
Driver	(Portugal) António Félix da Costa	Techeetah-DS
- Time: 1:26.522

Fastest lap
Driver	(Netherlands) Robin Frijns	Virgin-Audi
- Time: 1:39.611 on lap 14

Podium
First	(Netherlands) Nyck de Vries	Mercedes
Second	(Switzerland) Nico Müller	Dragon-Penske
Third	(Belgium) Stoffel Vandoorne	Mercedes

2021 Valencia ePrix
Race 6 of 15 of the 2020–21 Formula E season
← Previous race	Next race →

Race details
- Date: 25 April 2021
- Official name: 2021 DHL Valencia E-Prix
- Location: Circuit Ricardo Tormo, Cheste, Valencia
- Course: Permanent racing facility
- Course length: 3.376 km (2.098 mi)
- Distance: 30 laps, 101.280 km (62.932 mi)

Pole position
Driver	(United Kingdom) Jake Dennis	Andretti-BMW
- Time: 1:28.548

Fastest lap
Driver	(United Kingdom) Alexander Sims (United Kingdom) Alex Lynn (Note: Lynn received the point for fastest lap as Sims failed to finish in the top 10.)	Mahindra; Mahindra
- Time: 1:30.081 (1:30.263) on lap 26 (22)

Podium
First	(United Kingdom) Jake Dennis	Andretti-BMW
Second	(Germany) André Lotterer	Porsche
Third	(United Kingdom) Alex Lynn	Mahindra

The 2021 Valencia ePrix (formally the 2021 DHL Valencia E-Prix) was a pair of Formula E electric car races held at the Circuit Ricardo Tormo in the town of Cheste near Valencia, Spain on 24 and 25 April 2021. Having previously hosted numerous pre-season tests, this was the inaugural running of a competitive Formula E event at the track, as well as the first time an ePrix was held in Spain. It marked the fifth and sixth rounds of the 2020–21 Formula E season. The first race was won by Nyck de Vries, with Nico Müller and Stoffel Vandoorne rounding out the podium. Jake Dennis took his first Formula E victory in the second race, finishing ahead of André Lotterer and Alex Lynn.

The first race on 24 April was notable for the significant number of disqualifications and non-finishers. Of the field of twenty-four, only nine drivers would end up being awarded points.

== ePrix ==
=== Race one ===
Conditions on the track were wet, requiring a safety car start instead of the traditional standing start. This would lead to the race's first of five energy reductions, with this being a reduction of 2 KWH.

Following the restart with 10 minutes left, Da Costa would use his Fan Boost to gain enough distance over De Vries to then activate his second attack mode while retaining the lead. With six minutes to go before the extra lap, Lotterer would end up beached in Turn 1 after a collision with Edoardo Mortara while Mortara was in attack mode. De Vries still in second had just been asked by his team to push to keep up with Da Costa in first, but was unable to do so before the safety car came out with five minutes left. The green flag would waive again with 22 seconds left in the session and Da Costa would cross the line with 9 seconds left before the extra lap. The fifth energy reduction would be announced, this time for another 5 KWH for a total reduction of 19 KWH. De Vries would easily drive past Da Costa as Da Costa was struggling with the remaining energy. De Vries would finish in first with Rowland and Sims behind him, though both of the latter would be disqualified for exceed the energy limits. Müller and Vandoorne would be elevated to second and third respectively. Da Costa, Lynn, and Bird would all join Rowland and Sims in exceeding the energy limits and be subsequently disqualified. This left only nine drivers total to be classified and received points for the finish.

== Classification ==
=== Race one ===
==== Qualifying ====
Group draw
Group 1	(United Kingdom) BIR (1)	(New Zealand) EVA (2)	(Netherlands) FRI (3)	(Belgium) VAN (4)	(Netherlands) DEV (5)	(Germany) WEH (6)
Group 2	(Switzerland) MOR (7)	(France) JEV (8)	(United Kingdom) SIM (9)	(Portugal) DAC (10)	(Germany) RAS (11)	(United Kingdom) ROW (12)
Group 3	(Brazil) SET (13)	(Switzerland) MUL (14)	(Germany) GUE (15)	(Switzerland) BUE (16)	(United Kingdom) TUR (17)	(Brazil) DIG (18)
Group 4	(United Kingdom) BLO (19)	(United Kingdom) LYN (20)	(New Zealand) CAS (21)	(France) NAT (22)	(United Kingdom) DEN (23)	(Germany) LOT (24)

Pos.	No.	Driver	Team	GS	SP	Grid
1	13	(Portugal) António Félix da Costa	Techeetah-DS	1:26.870	1:26.522	1
2	17	(Netherlands) Nyck de Vries	Mercedes	1:26.914	1:26.730	7^{1}
3	28	(Germany) Maximilian Günther	Andretti-BMW	1:26.868	1:26.943	2
4	94	(United Kingdom) Alex Lynn	Mahindra	1:26.799	1:27.022	3
5	23	(Switzerland) Sébastien Buemi	e.dams-Nissan	1:26.876	1:27.053	4
6	36	(Germany) André Lotterer	Porsche	1:26.933	—N/a	5
7	71	(France) Norman Nato	Venturi-Mercedes	1:26.979	—N/a	6
8	22	(United Kingdom) Oliver Rowland	e.dams-Nissan	1:27.002	—N/a	8
9	99	(Germany) Pascal Wehrlein	Porsche	1:27.008	—N/a	9
10	37	(New Zealand) Nick Cassidy	Virgin-Audi	1:27.072	—N/a	10
11	29	(United Kingdom) Alexander Sims	Mahindra	1:27.109	—N/a	11
12	25	(France) Jean-Éric Vergne	Techeetah-DS	1:27.157	—N/a	12
13	27	(United Kingdom) Jake Dennis	Andretti-BMW	1:27.177	—N/a	13
14	33	(Germany) René Rast	Audi	1:27.290	—N/a	14
15	4	(Netherlands) Robin Frijns	Virgin-Audi	1:27.317	—N/a	15
16	48	(Switzerland) Edoardo Mortara	Venturi-Mercedes	1:27.338	—N/a	16
17	20	(New Zealand) Mitch Evans	Jaguar	1:27.442	—N/a	17
18	7	(Brazil) Sérgio Sette Câmara	Dragon-Penske	1:27.456	—N/a	18
19	88	(United Kingdom) Tom Blomqvist	NIO	1:27.481	—N/a	19
20	10	(United Kingdom) Sam Bird	Jaguar	1:27.619	—N/a	20
21	11	(Brazil) Lucas di Grassi	Audi	1:27.634	—N/a	21
22	6	(Switzerland) Nico Müller	Dragon-Penske	1:27.644	—N/a	22
23	8	(United Kingdom) Oliver Turvey	NIO	1:28.524	—N/a	23
24	5	(Belgium) Stoffel Vandoorne	Mercedes	no time^{2}	no time^{2}	24

Notes:

- ^1 – Nyck de Vries received a 5-place grid penalty for causing a collision in the previous race in Rome.
- ^2 – Stoffel Vandoorne originally qualified first with a 1:26.839 in the group stage and a 1:26.494 in the superpole, but later had all his lap times cancelled due to a tyre infringement.

==== Race ====
Pos.	No.	Driver	Team	Laps	Time/Retired	Grid	Points
1	17	(Netherlands) Nyck de Vries	Mercedes	24	48:20.547	7	25
2	6	(Switzerland) Nico Müller	Dragon-Penske	24	+13.128	22	18
3	5	(Belgium) Stoffel Vandoorne	Mercedes	24	+34.886^{4}	24	15
4	37	(New Zealand) Nick Cassidy	Virgin-Audi	24	+36.903	10	12
5	33	(Germany) René Rast	Audi	24	+51.650	14	10
6	4	(Netherlands) Robin Frijns	Virgin-Audi	24	+52.985	15	8+1^{1}
7	11	(Brazil) Lucas di Grassi	Audi	24	+2:41.946^{5}	21	6
8	27	(United Kingdom) Jake Dennis	Andretti-BMW	24	+3:07.061	13	4
9	25	(France) Jean-Éric Vergne	Techeetah-DS	24	+4:19.582	12	2
NC	8	(United Kingdom) Oliver Turvey	NIO	24	Retired in pits^{6}	23	
NC	88	(United Kingdom) Tom Blomqvist	NIO	24	Retired in pits^{6}	19	
NC	71	(France) Norman Nato	Venturi-Mercedes	23	+1 lap	6	
Ret	48	(Switzerland) Edoardo Mortara	Venturi-Mercedes	20	Collision damage	16	
Ret	99	(Germany) Pascal Wehrlein	Porsche	19	Brakes	9	
Ret	36	(Germany) André Lotterer	Porsche	19	Collision/Brakes	5	
Ret	20	(New Zealand) Mitch Evans	Jaguar	15	Collision damage	17	
Ret	7	(Brazil) Sérgio Sette Câmara	Dragon-Penske	14	Collision	18	
Ret	28	(Germany) Maximilian Günther	Andretti-BMW	10	Spun off	2	
Ret	23	(Switzerland) Sébastien Buemi	e.dams-Nissan	1	Collision	4	
DSQ^{7}	22	(United Kingdom) Oliver Rowland	e.dams-Nissan	24	Energy usage	8	
DSQ^{7}	29	(United Kingdom) Alexander Sims	Mahindra	24	Energy usage	11	
DSQ^{7}	13	(Portugal) António Félix da Costa	Techeetah-DS	24	Energy usage	1	3^{2}
DSQ^{7}	94	(United Kingdom) Alex Lynn	Mahindra	24	Energy usage	3	1^{3}
DSQ^{7}	10	(United Kingdom) Sam Bird	Jaguar	24	Energy usage	20	

Notes:

- ^1 – Fastest lap.
- ^2 – Pole position.
- ^3 – Fastest in group stage.
- ^4 – Stoffel Vandoorne received a 5-second time penalty for forcing another car off the track, and a further post-race 10-second time penalty for failing to fulfil the total amount of time of his second attack mode.
- ^5 – Lucas di Grassi received a post-race drive-through penalty converted into a 30-second time penalty for failing to activate the second of the two mandatory attack modes.
- ^6 – Both NIO drivers pulled into the pit lane at the end of the final lap after exceeding the maximum energy usage. As they did not cross the chequered flag, they were not classified.
- ^7 – Rowland, Sims, da Costa, Lynn and Bird originally finished 2nd, 3rd, 9th, 10th and 11th respectively, but were disqualified from the race due to their energy used being over the regulatory limit.

==== Standings after the race ====
Drivers' Championship standings

+/–	Pos	Driver	Points
4	1	(Netherlands) Nyck de Vries	57
2	2	(Belgium) Stoffel Vandoorne	48
2	3	(United Kingdom) Sam Bird	43
1	4	(Netherlands) Robin Frijns	43
3	5	(New Zealand) Mitch Evans	39

Teams' Championship standings

+/–	Pos	Constructor	Points
1	1	(Germany) Mercedes	105
1	2	(United Kingdom) Jaguar	82
1	3	(United Kingdom) Virgin-Audi	58
1	4	(China) Techeetah-DS	51
3	5	(Germany) Audi	43

- Notes: Only the top five positions are included for both sets of standings.

=== Race two ===
==== Qualifying ====
Group draw
Group 1	(Netherlands) DEV (1)	(Belgium) VAN (2)	(United Kingdom) BIR (3)	(Netherlands) FRI (4)	(New Zealand) EVA (5)	(Germany) WEH (6)
Group 2	(Germany) RAS (7)	(Switzerland) MUL (8)	(Switzerland) MOR (9)	(France) JEV (10)	(United Kingdom) SIM (11)	(Portugal) DAC (12)
Group 3	(New Zealand) CAS (13)	(United Kingdom) ROW (14)	(Brazil) SET (15)	(Germany) GUE (16)	(Brazil) DIG (17)	(Switzerland) BUE (18)
Group 4	(United Kingdom) TUR (19)	(United Kingdom) BLO (20)	(United Kingdom) LYN (21)	(United Kingdom) DEN (22)	(France) NAT (23)	(Germany) LOT (24)

Pos.	No.	Driver	Team	GS	SP	Grid
1	27	(United Kingdom) Jake Dennis	Andretti-BMW	1:31.855	1:28.548	1
2	36	(Germany) André Lotterer	Porsche	1:31.958	1:29.411	5^{1}
3	94	(United Kingdom) Alex Lynn	Mahindra	1:32.585	1:29.737	2
4	88	(United Kingdom) Tom Blomqvist	NIO	1:32.727	1:30.202	3
5	8	(United Kingdom) Oliver Turvey	NIO	1:32.950	1:30.403	4
6	71	(France) Norman Nato	Venturi-Mercedes	1:33.155	1:30.489	6
7	25	(France) Jean-Éric Vergne	Techeetah-DS	1:33.198	—N/a	7
8	22	(United Kingdom) Oliver Rowland	e.dams-Nissan	1:33.336	—N/a	8
9	23	(Switzerland) Sébastien Buemi	e.dams-Nissan	1:33.390	—N/a	9
10	7	(Brazil) Sérgio Sette Câmara	Dragon-Penske	1:33.452	—N/a	10
11	29	(United Kingdom) Alexander Sims	Mahindra	1:33.479	—N/a	11
12	13	(Portugal) António Félix da Costa	Techeetah-DS	1:33.604	—N/a	12
13	99	(Germany) Pascal Wehrlein	Porsche	1:33.745	—N/a	13
14	33	(Germany) René Rast	Audi	1:33.879	—N/a	14
15	48	(Switzerland) Edoardo Mortara	Venturi-Mercedes	1:33.898	—N/a	15
16	20	(New Zealand) Mitch Evans	Jaguar	1:34.115	—N/a	19^{1}
17	4	(Netherlands) Robin Frijns	Virgin-Audi	1:34.166	—N/a	16
18	5	(Belgium) Stoffel Vandoorne	Mercedes	1:34.416	—N/a	17
19	17	(Netherlands) Nyck de Vries	Mercedes	1:34.419	—N/a	18
20	10	(United Kingdom) Sam Bird	Jaguar	1:34.480	—N/a	20
21	6	(Switzerland) Nico Müller	Dragon-Penske	1:34.588	—N/a	21
22	11	(Brazil) Lucas di Grassi	Audi	1:34.610	—N/a	22
23	37	(New Zealand) Nick Cassidy	Virgin-Audi	1:37.838	—N/a	23
24	28	(Germany) Maximilian Günther	Andretti-BMW	1:41.980	—N/a	24

Notes:

- ^1 – André Lotterer and Mitch Evans received a 3-place grid penalty each for causing a collision in race one.

==== Race ====
Pos.	No.	Driver	Team	Laps	Time/Retired	Grid	Points
1	27	(United Kingdom) Jake Dennis	Andretti-BMW	30	46:32.002	1	25+3+1^{1}
2	36	(Germany) André Lotterer	Porsche	30	+1.483	5	18
3	94	(United Kingdom) Alex Lynn	Mahindra	30	+2.428	2	15+1^{2}
4	22	(United Kingdom) Oliver Rowland	e.dams-Nissan	30	+2.870	8	12
5	71	(France) Norman Nato	Venturi-Mercedes	30	+5.811^{3}	6	10
6	33	(Germany) René Rast	Audi	30	+8.122	14	8
7	25	(France) Jean-Éric Vergne	Techeetah-DS	30	+8.782	7	6
8	8	(United Kingdom) Oliver Turvey	NIO	30	+11.292	4	4
9	48	(Switzerland) Edoardo Mortara	Venturi-Mercedes	30	+12.014	15	2
10	11	(Brazil) Lucas di Grassi	Audi	30	+12.405	22	1
11	23	(Switzerland) Sébastien Buemi	e.dams-Nissan	30	+13.295	9	
12	28	(Germany) Maximilian Günther	Andretti-BMW	30	+13.594	24	
13	37	(New Zealand) Nick Cassidy	Virgin-Audi	30	+14.329	23	
14	10	(United Kingdom) Sam Bird	Jaguar	30	+15.151	20	
15	20	(New Zealand) Mitch Evans	Jaguar	30	+17.213	19	
16	17	(Netherlands) Nyck de Vries	Mercedes	30	+18.444	18	
17	88	(United Kingdom) Tom Blomqvist	NIO	30	+18.885	3	
18	99	(Germany) Pascal Wehrlein	Porsche	30	+19.274	13	
19	4	(Netherlands) Robin Frijns	Virgin-Audi	30	+19.756	16	
20	6	(Switzerland) Nico Müller	Dragon-Penske	30	+21.069	21	
21	7	(Brazil) Sérgio Sette Câmara	Dragon-Penske	30	+32.079	10	
22	13	(Portugal) António Félix da Costa	Techeetah-DS	30	+59.698	12	
23	29	(United Kingdom) Alexander Sims	Mahindra	30	+1:04.277	11	
Ret	5	(Belgium) Stoffel Vandoorne	Mercedes	20	Collision damage	17	

Notes:

- ^1 – Pole position; fastest in group stage.
- ^2 – Fastest lap.
- ^3 – Norman Nato received a 5-second time penalty for causing a collision.

==== Standings after the race ====
Drivers' Championship standings

+/–	Pos	Driver	Points
	1	(Netherlands) Nyck de Vries	57
	2	(Belgium) Stoffel Vandoorne	48
	3	(United Kingdom) Sam Bird	43
	4	(Netherlands) Robin Frijns	43
	5	(New Zealand) Mitch Evans	39

Teams' Championship standings

+/–	Pos	Constructor	Points
	1	(Germany) Mercedes	105
	2	(United Kingdom) Jaguar	82
	3	(United Kingdom) Virgin-Audi	58
	4	(China) Techeetah-DS	57
	5	(Germany) Audi	52

- Notes: Only the top five positions are included for both sets of standings.

== Controversy ==
The ending of the first race caused controversy after roughly half of the field ran out of power at the end of the 50-mile distance, with five cars being disqualified and two retiring for this reason. Frédéric Bertrand, circuit championships director of the FIA, said after the race that the finish of the race "demonstrated how difficult it was to win in Formula E", yet conceded that it should "never happen again". His comments were blasted by da Costa, one of the drivers disqualified for energy use, who stated that Formula E would become the "joke of the week" following that finish. Despite this the FIA stood by its energy management rules and race winner Nyck de Vries said that Formula E is "not necessarily" at fault.

== Notes ==
Previous race: 2021 Rome ePrix	FIA Formula E World Championship; 2020–21 season	Next race: 2021 Monaco ePrix
Previous race: N/A	Valencia ePrix	Next race: N/A
