= Abt Sportsline =

German auto racing company

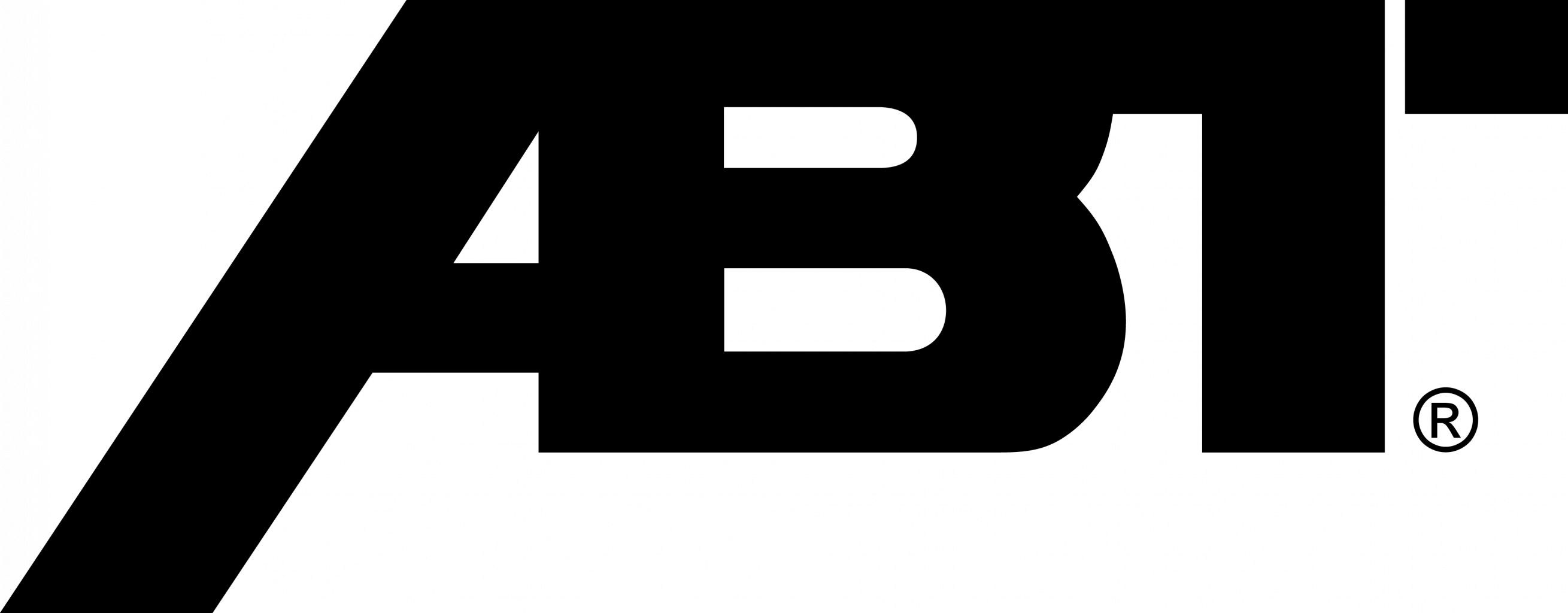
- Type: Privately held company
- Industry: Automotive industry, Motorsport
- Founded: 1896; 130 years ago as Auto-Abt; 1991; 35 years ago as Abt Sportsline GmbH
- Founder: Johann Abt
- Headquarters: Kempten im Allgäu, Germany
- Area served: Worldwide, with European main emphasis
- Key people: Hans-Jürgen Abt (managing director); Thomas Biermaier (managing director); Daniel Abt (managing director of Abt Lifestyle)
- Products: Specialist car body styling parts, engine tuning
- Services: Auto racing
- Website: Abt-Sportsline.de

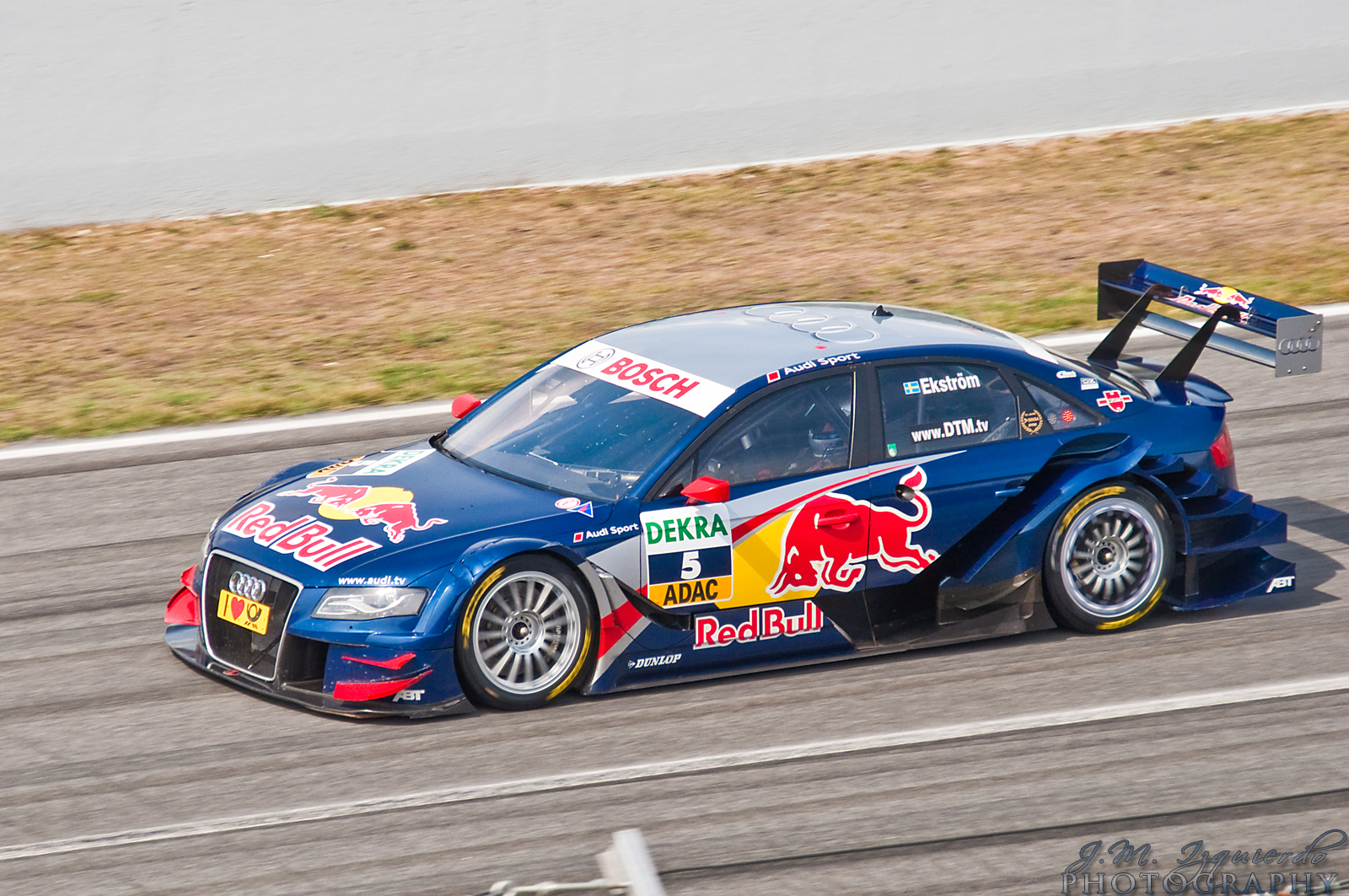
An Audi A4 DTM entered by Abt Sportsline team. Mattias Ekström is pictured driving the car in the 2009 Deutsche Tourenwagen Masters

Abt Sportsline is an auto racing and auto tuning company based in Kempten im Allgäu, Germany. Abt mainly deals with Audi and the related primary Volkswagen Group brands—Volkswagen, Škoda, and SEAT—modifying them by using sports-type suspensions, engine power upgrades, lightweight wheels, aerodynamic components and more. It has been active in DTM for more than a decade. After the death of their father Johann in 2003, the company with 170 employees in their headquarters in Kempten was run by the brothers Hans-Jürgen Abt (born 1962, Managing Director) and Christian Abt. Since 2011, Hans-Jürgen Abt has run the company.

From 2014 to 2021, they ran a team under the Audi Sport banner in the FIA Formula E World Championship for drivers Lucas di Grassi, Daniel Abt and René Rast. At the 2014 Beijing ePrix, di Grassi became the first driver to win an open-wheel motorsport race in an all-electric car. Ultimately, the team finished third in the first teams' championship. After leaving the championship in 2022, they returned without the Audi partnership for the 2022–23 season.

== History ==
Johann Abt (20 December 1935 – 11 October 2003) continued a horseshoeing and blacksmithing tradition of his family, started by his father Johann Baptist Abt, with motor cars. He was a motorcycling and hillclimbing racer for the Abarth factory team until 1970. He is the father of Hans-Jürgen Abt and Christian Abt. He later entered cars with his own team, winning the "Trophée de l'Avenir" and many other series. Johann Abt's father founded the first Abt company in 1896.

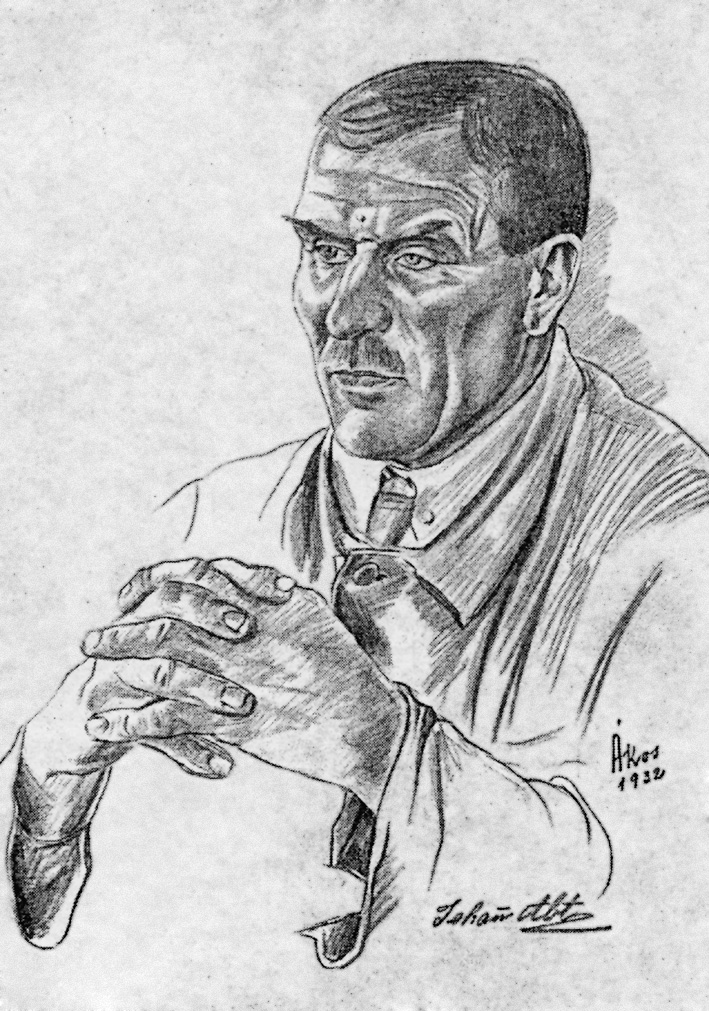
Company founder Johann Baptist Abt, 1932

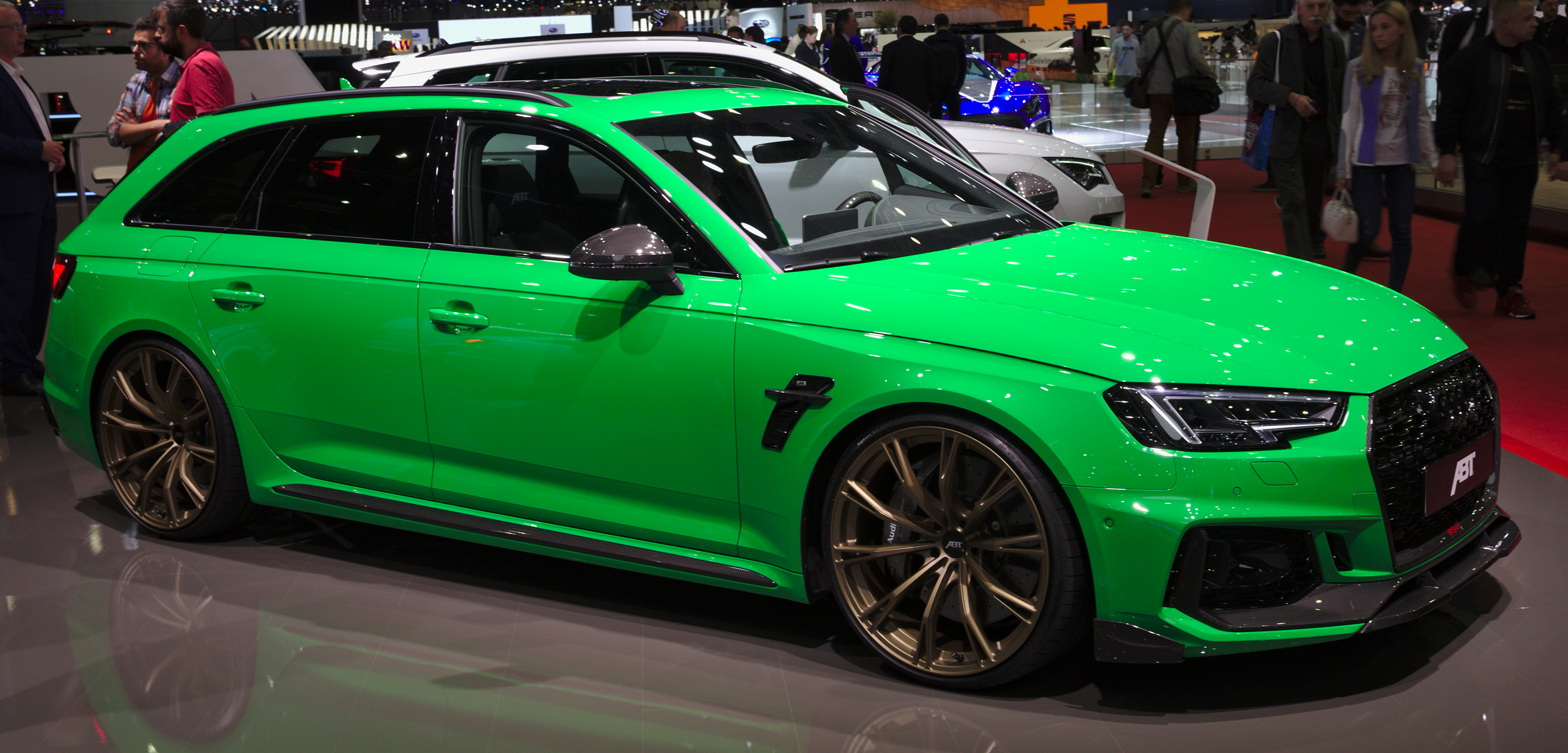
Abt Audi RS4-R Avant

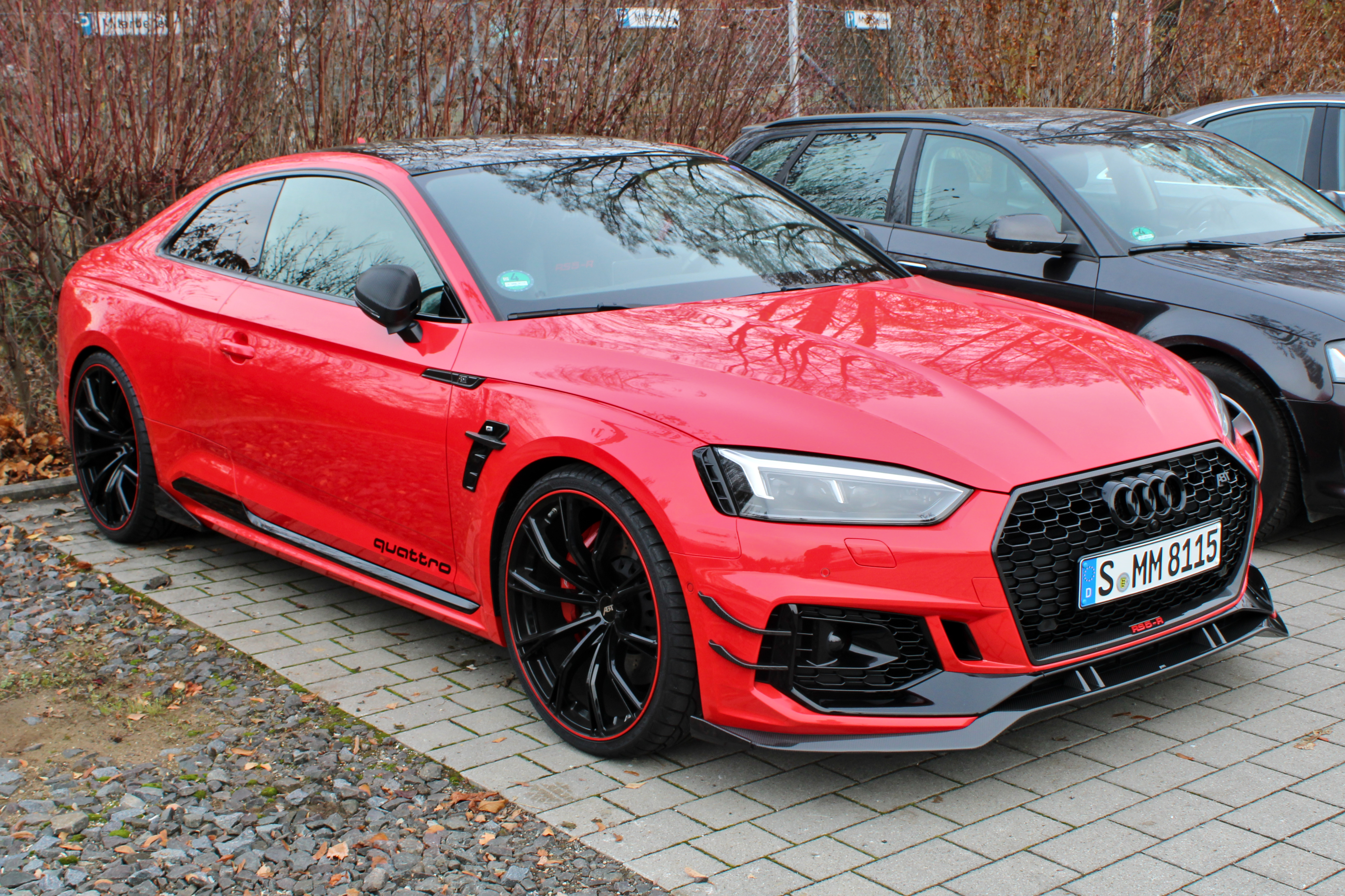
Abt Audi RS5-R

In 1991, Abt Sportsline GmbH was founded following "Auto-Abt". The headquarters moved to Daimlerstrasse in Kempten-Leubas and first offered about 3,500 square metres (38,000 sq ft) of space. In October 2002 an extension building was opened offering about 3,000 square metres (32,000 sq ft) extra of work space. Since November 2013 there is a third building giving the Abt Motorsports Department a new home.

In summer of 2011, Abt celebrated their 115th anniversary since the first formation of the company in 1896. About 170 employees are working in the company's headquarters in Kempten, Germany, the products are sold in more than 50 countries worldwide. Since 2011, the Abt Lifestyle GmbH, run by Daniel Abt, organizes events for private or business customers.

== Motorsport ==
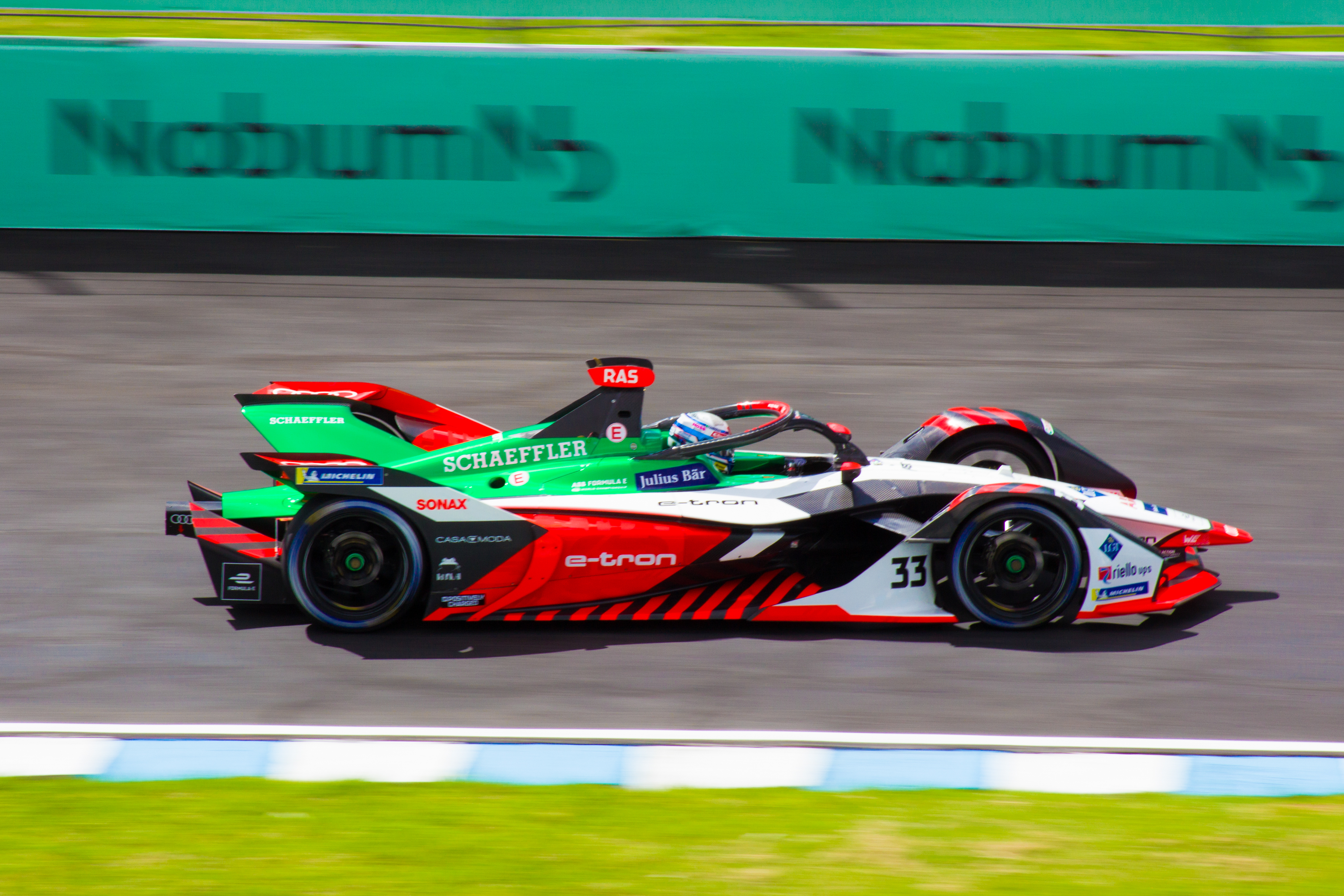
René Rast driving the Audi e-tron FE07 at the 2021 Puebla ePrix, the final Audi Sport ABT Formula E car.

After participating in a motorcycle race the company's founder Johann Abt started his racing career and the motorsports career of the company in general. Today Abt Sportsline is one of the most successful motorsports teams and has won several championships in the most important German racing series, like the Super Touring Car Cup (1999), the Deutsche Tourenwagen Masters (DTM; titles in 2002, 2004, 2007, 2008, and 2009) and the ADAC GT Masters (titles in 2009 and 2010). Since 2004, Abt Sportsline is one of the official factory teams of Audi under the name of Audi Sport Team Abt Sportsline.

The most successful year in motorsports for Abt Sportsline was 2009, receiving honors in three racing series at once: the DTM with Timo Scheider, the ADAC GT Masters with Christian Abt and the ADAC Formel Masters with Daniel Abt. In 2013, Daniel Abt was active in the GP2 Series and – beginning in September 2014 – he joined Lucas di Grassi as the second driver in the FIA Formula E Championship, where Abt participated.

The German squad left Formula E after the 2020–21 season. In May 2022, Abt announced they would be returning to Formula E for the 2022–23 season with Cupra as Abt Cupra Formula E Team after a season away, sourcing powertrains from Mahindra Racing. In April 2024, it was reported that Abt Cupra's powertrain deal with Mahindra will end at the conclusion of the 2023–24 season and will be using Lola-Yamaha powertrains for the 2024–25 season onward. The team entered the season as Lola Yamaha Abt Formula E Team with Lola taking over Abt's Formula E entrants' licence. Abt ran the team operationally until the 2025–26 season.

Abt partnered with Cupra to enter the electric off-road racing series Extreme E as Abt Cupra XE in 2021. The team left the sport at the end of 2023 but are open to entering the new hydrogen-based off-road racing series Extreme H in 2025.

== Aftermarket ==
Abt has taken much of their racing knowledge and adapted it for the street, making the company a tuner for the full Volkswagen Group line of products.

Abt Sportsline has announced in 2015 that they are going to introduce their new tuning program for the European Volkswagen Passat at the Geneva Motor Show. While hosting the new Passat, their goal is to showcase a more aggressive kit that includes a front lip spoiler, revised side skirts, a tailgate-mounted spoiler, Abt-branded floor mats, 20- or 21-inch alloy wheels with Continental "sport-type" tires, optional mirror caps, sport springs and sports exhaust system, and a body kit that is more aerodynamic than the standard model.

Aesthetics aside, changes in the Passat's performance include limited yet different 2.0-liter TDI four-cylinder engine with the capacity to be tuned to produce 280 PS (206 kW; 276 hp) – an increase of 40 PS (29 kW; 39 hp) over the previous model.

== Notable cars ==
- AS4-R – A highly modified B7 A4 Avant, the ASR-R makes use of the bi-turbo 2.7L V6 to produce 480 hp (358 kW) at 6800 rpm, and 417 lb⋅ft (565 N⋅m) of torque at 3300 rpm. Modified Luxury & Exotics magazine called the AS4-R, "a grocery getter that delivers," and said it, "handles like a toy..."
- TT-R – A supercharged second generation V6 Audi TT.
- R8-R – Not yet released, Abt's R8 will feature a supercharger mated to Audi's 4.2L V8 for a total horsepower output of 530 hp (395 kW; 537 PS).
- R8 GT R – A highly modified version of the Audi R8 V10 turning it into what Abt Sportsline calls a "motorsport champion for the road." The Abt R8 GT R features a tuned version of the 5.2-liter V10 engine, boosting the power from 525 hp (391 kW; 532 PS) to 620 hp (462 kW; 629 PS). Many new exterior parts are made from carbon fiber, dropping the car's weight by 220 lb (100 kg). The interior features many modifications to make it more like a race car, including racing seats, a fire extinguisher, a 4-point seat belt, a rollover bar, and new steering wheel. Various other modifications make this a high performance road-legal race car.

== Racing results ==
=== Formula E ===
Year	Chassis	Powertrain	Tyres	No.	Drivers	1	2	3	4	5	6	7	8	9	10	11	12	13	14	15	16	17	Points	T.C.
Audi Sport Abt Formula E Team
2014–15	Spark SRT01-e	SRT01-e^{1}	M			BEI	PUT	PDE	BUE	MIA	LBH	MCO	BER	MSC	LDN								165	3rd
2014–15	Spark SRT01-e	SRT01-e^{1}	M	11	(Brazil) Lucas di Grassi	1	2	3	Ret	9	3	2	DSQ	2	4	6							165	3rd
2014–15	Spark SRT01-e	SRT01-e^{1}	M	66	(Germany) Daniel Abt	10	10	15	13†	3	**15**	Ret	14	5	Ret	11							165	3rd
Abt Schaeffler Audi Sport
2015–16	Spark SRT01-e	ABT Schaeffler FE01	M			BEI	PUT	PDE	BUE	MEX	LBH	PAR	BER	LDN									221	2nd
2015–16	Spark SRT01-e	ABT Schaeffler FE01	M	11	(Brazil) Lucas di Grassi	2	1	2	3	DSQ	1	1	3	4	Ret								221	2nd
2015–16	Spark SRT01-e	ABT Schaeffler FE01	M	66	(Germany) Daniel Abt	11	7	8	13	7	3	10	2	Ret	2								221	2nd
2016–17	Spark SRT01-e	ABT Schaeffler FE02	M			HKG	MRK	BUE	MEX	MCO	PAR	BER		NYC		MTL							248	2nd
2016–17	Spark SRT01-e	ABT Schaeffler FE02	M	11	(Brazil) Lucas di Grassi	2	5	**3**	1	2	Ret	**2**	3	4	5	**1**	7						248	2nd
2016–17	Spark SRT01-e	ABT Schaeffler FE02	M	66	(Germany) Daniel Abt	Ret	6	7	7	7	13	6	4	14	Ret	4	6						248	2nd
Audi Sport Abt Schaeffler
2017–18	Spark SRT01-e	Audi e-tron FE04	M			HKG		MRK	SCL	MEX	PDE	RME	PAR	BER	ZUR	NYC							264	1st
2017–18	Spark SRT01-e	Audi e-tron FE04	M	1	(Brazil) Lucas di Grassi	17	14	Ret	Ret	9	2	2	2	2	1	1	2						264	1st
2017–18	Spark SRT01-e	Audi e-tron FE04	M	66	(Germany) Daniel Abt	5	DSQ	10	Ret	1	14	4	7	**1**	13	2	3						264	1st
2018–19	Spark SRT05e	Audi e-tron FE05	M			ADR	MRK	SCL	MEX	HKG	SYX	RME	PAR	MCO	BER	BRN	NYC						203	2nd
2018–19	Spark SRT05e	Audi e-tron FE05	M	11	(Brazil) Lucas di Grassi	9	7	12	1	2	15†	7	4	Ret	1	9	5	18†					203	2nd
2018–19	Spark SRT05e	Audi e-tron FE05	M	66	(Germany) Daniel Abt	8	10	3	10	4	5	18†	3	15	6	6	6	5					203	2nd
2019–20	Spark SRT05e	Audi e-tron FE06	M			DIR		SCL	MEX	MRK	BER		BER		BER								114	6th
2019–20	Spark SRT05e	Audi e-tron FE06	M	11	(Brazil) Lucas di Grassi	13	2	7	6	7	8	3	8	6	21	6							114	6th
2019–20	Spark SRT05e	Audi e-tron FE06	M	66	(Germany) Daniel Abt	Ret	6	14	Ret	14													114	6th
2019–20	Spark SRT05e	Audi e-tron FE06	M	66	(Germany) René Rast						10	13	Ret	16	3^{G}	4							114	6th
2020–21	Spark SRT05e	Audi e-tron FE07	M			DIR		RME		VLC		MCO	PUE		NYC		LDN		BER	BER			165	4th
2020–21	Spark SRT05e	Audi e-tron FE07	M	11	(Brazil) Lucas di Grassi	9	8	Ret	Ret	7	10	10	1	18	3	14	6	DSQ	1	20			165	4th
2020–21	Spark SRT05e	Audi e-tron FE07	M	33	(Germany) René Rast	4	17	6	Ret	5	6	Ret	2	10	10	20	5	Ret	9	9			165	4th
Abt Cupra Formula E Team
2022–23	Formula E Gen3	Mahindra M9Electro	H			MEX	DRH		HYD	CAP	SAP	BER		MCO	JAK		POR	RME		LDN			21	11th
2022–23	Formula E Gen3	Mahindra M9Electro	H	4	(Netherlands) Robin Frijns	Ret					14	14	**17**	13	9	13	10	Ret	Ret	Ret	17		21	11th
2022–23	Formula E Gen3	Mahindra M9Electro	H	4	(South Africa) Kelvin van der Linde		16	18	Ret	WD													21	11th
2022–23	Formula E Gen3	Mahindra M9Electro	H	51	(Switzerland) Nico Müller	14	Ret	Ret	11	WD	Ret	15	9	Ret	11	12	Ret	6	10	Ret	8		21	11th
2023–24	Formula E Gen3	Mahindra M9Electro	H			MEX	DIR		SAP	TKO	MIS		MCO	BER		SHA		POR		LDN			56	9th
2023–24	Formula E Gen3	Mahindra M9Electro	H	11	(Brazil) Lucas di Grassi	Ret	19	18	13	Ret	10	11	11	Ret	11	10	19	11	17	11	9		56	9th
2023–24	Formula E Gen3	Mahindra M9Electro	H	51	(Switzerland) Nico Müller	17	18	13	Ret	7	11	4	Ret			15	15	5	6	6	6		56	9th
2023–24	Formula E Gen3	Mahindra M9Electro	H	51	(South Africa) Kelvin van der Linde									11	15								56	9th
Lola Yamaha Abt Formula E Team
2024–25	Formula E Gen3 Evo	Lola-Yamaha T001	H			SAP	MEX	JED		MIA	MCO		TKO		SHA		JAK	BER		LDN			32	11th
2024–25	Formula E Gen3 Evo	Lola-Yamaha T001	H	11	(Brazil) Lucas di Grassi	Ret	20	DSQ	16	2	13	Ret	17	5	18	9	13	18	12	17	9		32	11th
2024–25	Formula E Gen3 Evo	Lola-Yamaha T001	H	22	(Barbados) Zane Maloney	12	15	16	18	19	21	14	16	14	19	11	18	16	Ret	Ret	16		32	11th
2025–2026	Formula E Gen3 Evo	Lola-Yamaha T001	H			SAP	MEX	MIA	JED		MAD	BER		MCO		SAN	SHA		TKO		LDN		35	10th
2025–2026	Formula E Gen3 Evo	Lola-Yamaha T001	H	11	(Brazil) Lucas di Grassi	Ret	13	13	16	15	12	17	16	8	9	10	17	1	11	11	Ret	Ret	35	10th
2025–2026	Formula E Gen3 Evo	Lola-Yamaha T001	H	22	(Barbados) Zane Maloney	10	16	11	Ret	18	20	15	17	13	10	11	11	Ret	19	10	Ret	17	35	10th

Notes

- **^1** – In the inaugural season, all teams were supplied with a spec powertrain by McLaren.
- ^{G} – Driver was fastest in group qualifying stage and was given one championship point.
- † – Driver did not finish the race, but was classified as he completed over 90% of the race distance.
- * – Season still in progress.

==== Other teams supplied by Audi Sport Abt ====
Year	Team	Chassis	Powertrain	Tyres	No.	Drivers	Points	T.C.	Source
2018–19	(United Kingdom) Envision Virgin Racing	Spark SRT05e	Audi e-tron FE05	M	No.	Drivers	191	3rd	
2018–19	(United Kingdom) Envision Virgin Racing	Spark SRT05e	Audi e-tron FE05	M	2	(United Kingdom) Sam Bird	191	3rd	
2018–19	(United Kingdom) Envision Virgin Racing	Spark SRT05e	Audi e-tron FE05	M	4	(Netherlands) Robin Frijns	191	3rd	
2019–20	(United Kingdom) Envision Virgin Racing	Spark SRT05e	Audi e-tron FE06	M	2	(United Kingdom) Sam Bird	121	4th	
2019–20	(United Kingdom) Envision Virgin Racing	Spark SRT05e	Audi e-tron FE06	M	4	(Netherlands) Robin Frijns	121	4th	
2020–21	(United Kingdom) Envision Virgin Racing	Spark SRT05e	Audi e-tron FE07	M	4	(Netherlands) Robin Frijns	165	5th	
2020–21	(United Kingdom) Envision Virgin Racing	Spark SRT05e	Audi e-tron FE07	M	37	(New Zealand) Nick Cassidy	165	5th	
2021–22	(United Kingdom) Envision Racing	Spark SRT05e	Audi e-tron FE07	M	4	(Netherlands) Robin Frijns	194	5th	
2021–22	(United Kingdom) Envision Racing	Spark SRT05e	Audi e-tron FE07	M	37	(New Zealand) Nick Cassidy	194	5th	

=== Extreme E results ===
==== Racing overview ====
Year	Name	Car	Tyres	No.	G.	Drivers	Rounds	Pts.	Pos.
2021	(Germany) Abt Cupra XE	Spark Odyssey 21	C	125.	F	(Germany) Claudia Hürtgen (Germany) Jutta Kleinschmidt	(1–2) (2–5)	100	5th
2021	(Germany) Abt Cupra XE	Spark Odyssey 21	C	125.	M	(Sweden) Mattias Ekström	(1–5)	100	5th
2022	(Germany) Abt Cupra XE	Spark Odyssey 21	C	125.	F	(Germany) Jutta Kleinschmidt (Sweden) Klara Andersson	(1–4) (4–5)	46	6th
2022	(Germany) Abt Cupra XE	Spark Odyssey 21	C	125.	M	(Qatar) Nasser Al-Attiyah	(1–5)	46	6th
2023	(Germany) Abt Cupra XE	Spark Odyssey 21	C	125.	F	(Sweden) Klara Andersson	(1–10)	81	6th
2023	(Germany) Abt Cupra XE	Spark Odyssey 21	C	125.	M	(Qatar) Nasser Al-Attiyah (France) Sébastien Loeb (France) Adrien Tambay	(1–4) (5–8) (9–10)	81	6th

==== Racing summary ====
Year	Series	Races	Wins	Pod.	B/Qual.	S/S	Pts.	Pos.
2021	Extreme E	5	0	1	0	0	100	5th
2022	Extreme E	5	0	1	0	1	46	6th
2023	Extreme E	10	0	2	1	0	81	6th

==== Complete Extreme E results ====
(Races in bold indicate best qualifiers; races in italics indicate fastest super sector)

Year	Entrant	1	2	3	4	5	6	7	8	9	10	Pts.	Pos.
2021	Abt Cupra XE	DES (Saudi Arabia); 7	OCE (Senegal); 5	ARC (Greenland); 7	ISL (Italy); 2	JUR (United Kingdom); 7						100	5th
2022	Abt Cupra XE	DES (Saudi Arabia); 8	ISL1 (Italy); 9	ISL2 (Italy); DSQ	COP (Chile); 3	ENE (Uruguay); 1						46	6th
2023	Abt Cupra XE	DES1 (Saudi Arabia); 9	DES2 (Saudi Arabia); 4	HYD1 (United Kingdom); 10	HYD2 (United Kingdom); 8	ISL1 R1 (Italy); 4	ISL1 R2 (Italy); 6	ISL2 R1 (Italy); 2	ISL2 R2 (Italy); 3	COP1 (Chile); DNS	COP2 (Chile); 7	81	6th

== List of models ==
- Abt Sportsline Golf GTi (1976-1978)
- Abt Sportsline Scirocco (1977-1981)
- Abt Sportsline Golf GTi 1800 (1982-1983)
- Abt Sportsline Coupé GT (1983)
- Abt Sportsline 80 Quattro (1985)
- Abt Sportsline B300 (1987-1991)
- Abt Sportsline 200 Quattro (1988-1991)
- Abt Sportsline C5 (1989)
- Abt Sportsline S2-C4 (1992-)
- Abt Sportsline VS4 (1998-2003)
- Abt Sportsline TT-R DTM Prototype (1999)
- Abt Sportsline S3 (1999-2001)
- Abt Sportsline A3 (2000-2003)
- Abt Sportsline Passat Variant (2000-2005)
- Abt Sportsline AS4 (2001-2004)
- Abt Sportsline A2 (2001-2005)
- Abt Sportsline VS3 (2001-2005)
- Abt Sportsline AS6 Allroad Quattro (2001-2006)
- Abt Sportsline AS3 (2002)
- Abt Sportsline AS6 (2002)
- Abt Sportsline TT Limited (2002)
- Abt Sportsline TT Limited II (2002)
- Abt Sportsline TT Limited Wide Body (2002)
- Abt Sportsline TT-R (2002)
- Abt Sportsline RS6 Avant (2002-2004)
- Abt Sportsline AS4 Cabriolet (2002-2005)
- Abt Sportsline Fabia (2002-2005)
- Abt Sportsline León Cupra (2002-2005)
- Abt Sportsline Superb (2002-2006)
- Abt Sportsline TT Sport (2002-2006)
- Abt Sportsline TT Sport Roadster (2002-2006)
- Abt Sportsline New Beetle Cabriolet (2003)
- Abt Sportsline S4+ Avant (2003)
- Abt Sportsline Octavia (2003-2004)
- Abt Sportsline AS8 (2003-2005)
- Abt Sportsline Touran (2003-2006)
- Abt Sportsline VS10 (2003-2007)
- Abt Sportsline AS400 (2004)
- Abt Sportsline T5 Sporting Van (2004)
- Abt Sportsline Octavia Combi (2004-2008)
- Abt Sportsline VS4 (2004-2008)
- Abt Sportsline AS4 Avant (2005)
- Abt Sportsline AS4-R Avant (2005)
- Abt Sportsline Passat (2005)
- Abt Sportsline Toledo (2005)
- Abt Sportsline AS4 (2005-2007)
- Abt Sportsline RS4 (2005-2007)
- Abt Sportsline AS3 Sportback (2005-2008)
- Abt Sportsline AS8 (2005-2008)
- Abt Sportsline VS4-R (2005-2008)
- Abt Sportsline Altea (2005-2009)
- Abt Sportsline AS7 (2005-2009)
- Abt Sportsline Fox (2005-2009)
- Abt Sportsline VS4 (2005-2009)
- Abt Sportsline Jetta VS4 (2005-2010)
- Abt Sportsline VS4 (2005-2010)
- Abt Sportsline León IS (2006)
- Abt Sportsline Phaeton (2006)
- Abt Sportsline S8 (2006)
- Abt Sportsline A6 Allroad Quattro (2006-2008)
- Abt Sportsline AS3 (2006-2008)
- Abt Sportsline AS3-R (2006-2008)
- Abt Sportsline AS6 (2006-2008)
- Abt Sportsline AS6 Avant (2006-2008)
- Abt Sportsline Golf R32 (2006-2008)
- Abt Sportsline Ibiza (2006-2008)
- Abt Sportsline Octavia RS (2006-2008)
- Abt Sportsline Eos (2006-2010)
- Abt Sportsline S3 (2006-2010)
- Abt Sportsline Touran (2006-2010)
- Abt Sportsline Magotan (2007)
- Abt Sportsline Roomster (2007)
- Abt Sportsline VS6 (2007)
- Abt Sportsline TT (2007-2010)
- Abt Sportsline TT Roadster (2007-2010)
- Abt Sportsline TT Sport (2007-2010)
- Abt Sportsline TT-R (2007-2010)
- Abt Sportsline AS6 (2008)
- Abt Sportsline Fabia (2008)
- Abt Sportsline Touareg TDI (2008)
- Abt Sportsline VS4 Variant (2008)
- Abt Sportsline A3 Cabriolet (2008-2010)
- Abt Sportsline Phaeton (2008-2010)
- Abt Sportsline RS6 Avant (2008-2010)
- Abt Sportsline AS5 (2008-2011)
- Abt Sportsline VS4 (2008-2011)
- Abt Sportsline AS4 (2008-2012)
- Abt Sportsline AS4 Avant (2008-2012)
- Abt Sportsline Passat CC (2008-2012)
- Abt Sportsline Q5 (2008-2012)
- Abt Sportsline R8 (2008-2012)
- Abt Sportsline R8 Spyder (2008-2012)
- Abt Sportsline Scirocco (2008-2014)
- Abt Sportsline A5 Cabriolet Radeberger Pilsner (2009)
- Abt Sportsline AS7 (2009)
- Abt Sportsline Q7 V12 TDI (2009)
- Abt Sportsline S4 (2009)
- Abt Sportsline X-Bow (2009-)
- Abt Sportsline AS3 (2009-2010)
- Abt Sportsline AS5 Cabriolet (2009-2011)
- Abt Sportsline AS5 Sportback (2009-2011)
- Abt Sportsline AS5-R (2009-2011)
- Abt Sportsline Golf GTD (2009-2012)
- Abt Sportsline Golf GTi (2009-2012)
- Abt Sportsline R8 Carbon (2009-2012)
- Abt Sportsline R8 V10 (2009-2012)
- Abt Sportsline VS4 (2009-2012)
- Abt Sportsline Polo (2009-2014)
- Abt Sportsline TT RS (2009-2014)
- Abt Sportsline TT RS Roadster (2009-2014)
- Abt Sportsline Exeo (2010)
- Abt Sportsline Golf R (2010)
- Abt Sportsline Ibiza (2010)
- Abt Sportsline R8 GTR (2010-2012)
- Abt Sportsline R8 V10 Spyder (2010-2012)
- Abt Sportsline RS5 (2010-2012)
- Abt Sportsline AS8 4.2 TDI (2010-2013)
- Abt Sportsline AS1 (2010-2014)
- Abt Sportsline Touareg (2010-2014)
- Abt Sportsline Multivan (2010-2015)
- Abt Sportsline Amarok (2010-2016)
- Abt Sportsline R8 GTR Polizei "Tune it! Safe!" Concept (2011)
- Abt Sportsline R8 GTS Spyder (2011-2012)
- Abt Sportsline RS3 Sportback (2011-2012)
- Abt Sportsline A7 Sportback (2011-2014)
- Abt Sportsline AS6 (2011-2015)
- Abt Sportsline AS6 Avant (2011-2015)
- Abt Sportsline QS3 (2011-2015)
- Abt Sportsline VS4 (2011-2016)
- Abt Sportsline A1 Quattro (2012)
- Abt Sportsline QS5 (2012)
- Abt Sportsline Up! (2012)
- Abt Sportsline AS8 (2012-2013)
- Abt Sportsline AS1 Sportback (2012-2014)
- Abt Sportsline AS7 Sportback (2012-2014)
- Abt Sportsline RS4 Avant (2012-2015)
- Abt Sportsline AS3 (2012-2016)
- Abt Sportsline AS4 (2012-2016)
- Abt Sportsline AS4 Avant (2012-2016)
- Abt Sportsline AS5 (2012-2016)
- Abt Sportsline Coccinelle (2012-2016)
- Abt Sportsline Coccinelle Cabriolet (2012-2016)
- Abt Sportsline S5 (2012-2016)
- Abt Sportsline S5 Cabriolet (2012-2016)
- Abt Sportsline S5 Sportback (2012-2016)
- Abt Sportsline Golf GTi (2012-2017)
- Abt Sportsline Polo R WRC Street (2013)
- Abt Sportsline R8 GTR (2013)
- Abt Sportsline AS6-R Avant (2013-2014)
- Abt Sportsline RS6 Avant (2013-2014)
- Abt Sportsline RS7 Sportback (2013-2014)
- Abt Sportsline Golf 1.4 TSI (2013-2015)
- Abt Sportsline Golf 1.6 TDI (2013-2015)
- Abt Sportsline AS3 Sportback (2013-2016)
- Abt Sportsline RS5-R (2013-2016)
- Abt Sportsline S3 (2013-2016)
- Abt Sportsline AS5 Sportback (2013-2017)
- Abt Sportsline Golf 1.4 TSI (2013-2017)
- Abt Sportsline Golf 2.0 TDI (2013-2017)
- Abt Sportsline Golf GTI Dark Edition (2013-2017)
- Abt Sportsline Golf GTi Performance (2013-2017)
- Abt Sportsline R8 V10 (2013-2017)
- Abt Sportsline SQ5 (2013-2017)
- Abt Sportsline Golf GTD (2013-2018)
- Abt Sportsline Multivan (2014)
- Abt Sportsline RS6-R Avant (2014)
- Abt Sportsline RS Q3 (2014-2015)
- Abt Sportsline S3 Berline (2014-2016)
- Abt Sportsline AS5 Sportback Dark (2014-2017)
- Abt Sportsline AS8 (2014-2017)
- Abt Sportsline Golf R (2014-2017)
- Abt Sportsline RS5 Cabriolet (2014-2017)
- Abt Sportsline S1 Sportback (2014-2018)
- Abt Sportsline TT (2014-2018)
- Abt Sportsline RS3 Sportback (2015)
- Abt Sportsline Schaeffler FE01 (2015-2016)
