= Mercedes-EQ =

Electric brand series by Mercedes-Benz

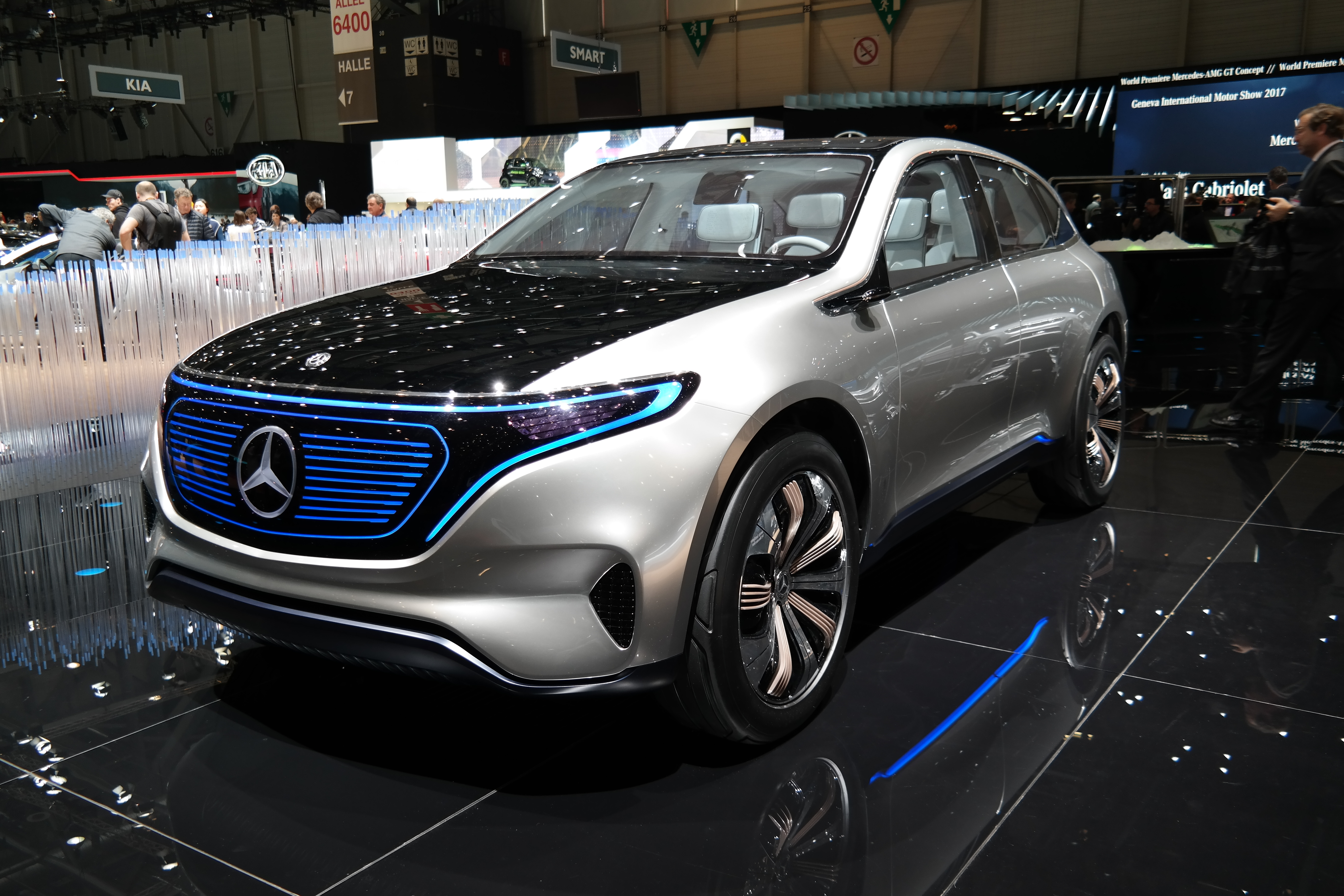
- Mercedes-Benz EQC Concept
- Product type: Plug-in electric vehicles
- Current owner: Mercedes-Benz Group
- Produced by: Mercedes-Benz
- Introduced: 2016; 10 years ago
- Website: group.mercedes-benz.com/innovation/drive-systems/electric/

Mercedes-EQ is a series of battery electric vehicles manufactured by Mercedes-Benz. The first model was previewed at the Paris Motor Show in 2016 with the Generation EQ concept vehicle. Mercedes-Benz intends to produce ten EQ models by 2022, three of which will have the Smart brand, representing between 15% and 25% of the company's global sales. All of Mercedes-Benz electric vehicle design and production efforts will target the EQ family.

Mercedes-Benz EQC, the first member of the EQ range, was presented at a special event held in Stockholm in 2018.

== Overview ==
Dieter Zetsche, chairman of Mercedes-Benz Group, stated that the new brand will consist of all Mercedes-Benz "electrification efforts", with a goal of having it represent between 15% and 25% of global sales for the company by 2025, dependent on "the continued development of infrastructure and customer preferences". Jurgen Schenk, a director of Mercedes-Benz who will oversee the development of the electric vehicle program, stated that the company expects energy density improvements to battery technology to be about 14% per year until 2025, equivalent to improvements seen between 2010 and 2016.

To meet production targets, Mercedes-Benz Group intends to invest €1 billion for capital expansion projects of its global battery production, half of which will be dedicated to its Deutsche ACCUmotive subsidiary lithium-ion battery manufacturing facilities in Kamenz, Germany. This is part of the company's investment of up to €10 billion for the design and development of electric vehicles.

The vehicles will use the Combined Charging System, a wall charger, or an optional wireless inductive charging system.

== Models ==
- EQC
- EQV
- EQA
- EQB
- EQS
- EQE
- EQS SUV
- EQE SUV
- EQT
- G580 with EQ Technology
- CLA with EQ Technology
- GLC Electric
- GLB with EQ Technology
- C-Class Electric

== Others ==
=== Smart EQ ===
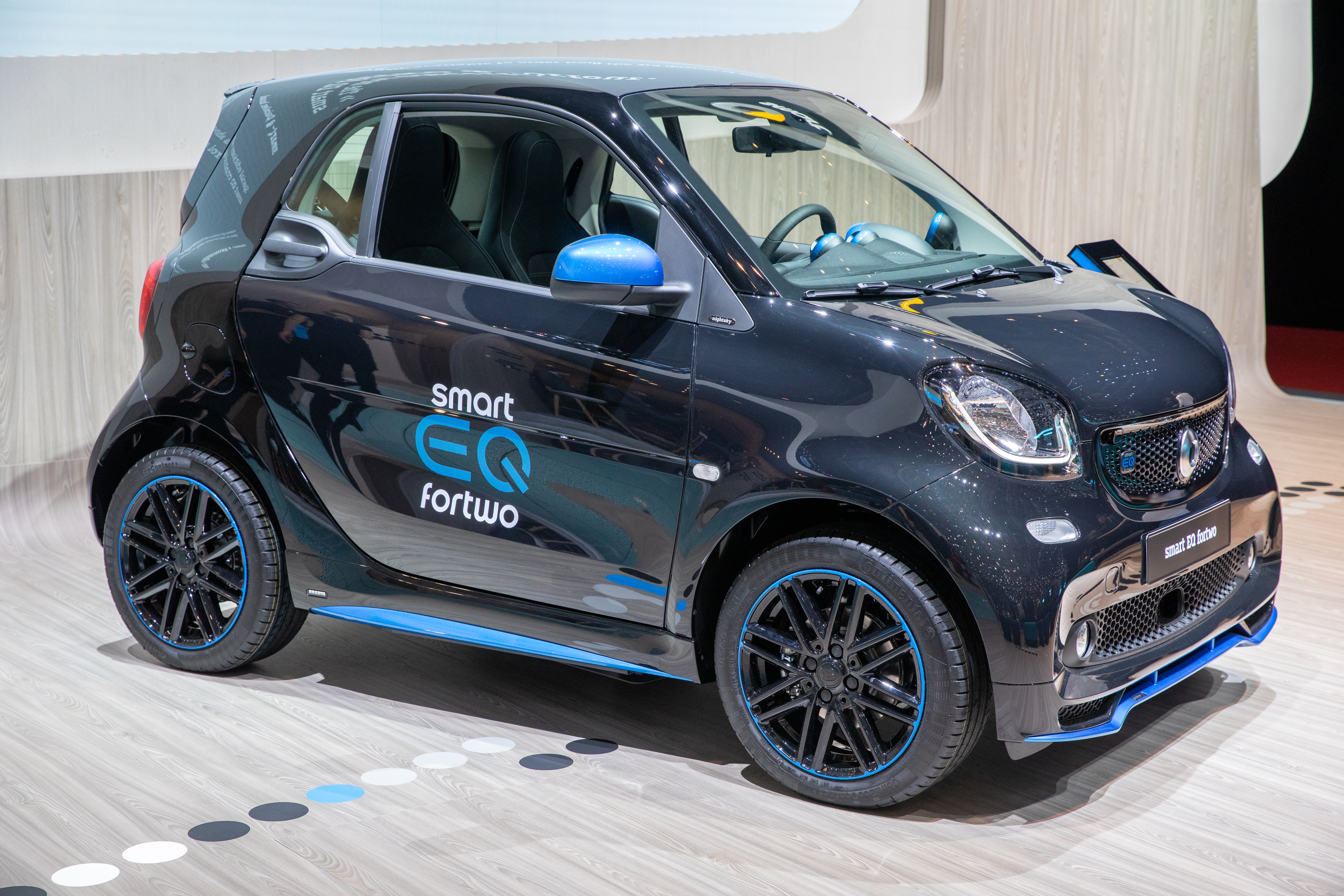
Smart EQ Fortwo

In March 2018, the three all-electric Smart models were rebranded to use the EQ brand, Smart EQ Fortwo, Smart EQ Fortwo Cabrio and the Smart EQ Forfour.

=== EQ hybrids ===
In addition to the EQ models, the EQ brand will be extended to the EQ Boost name being given to Mercedes-Benz models using the 48 volt mild hybrid system, while the third-generation of plug-in hybrids due from the end of 2018 will wear EQ Power badges. The new system mates a nine-speed automatic with the electric motor and clutch in the same unit, promising both considerably longer range in electric mode (up to 49 km) and a slightly faster 140 km/h (87 mph) top speed.

=== EQ Silver Arrow Concept ===
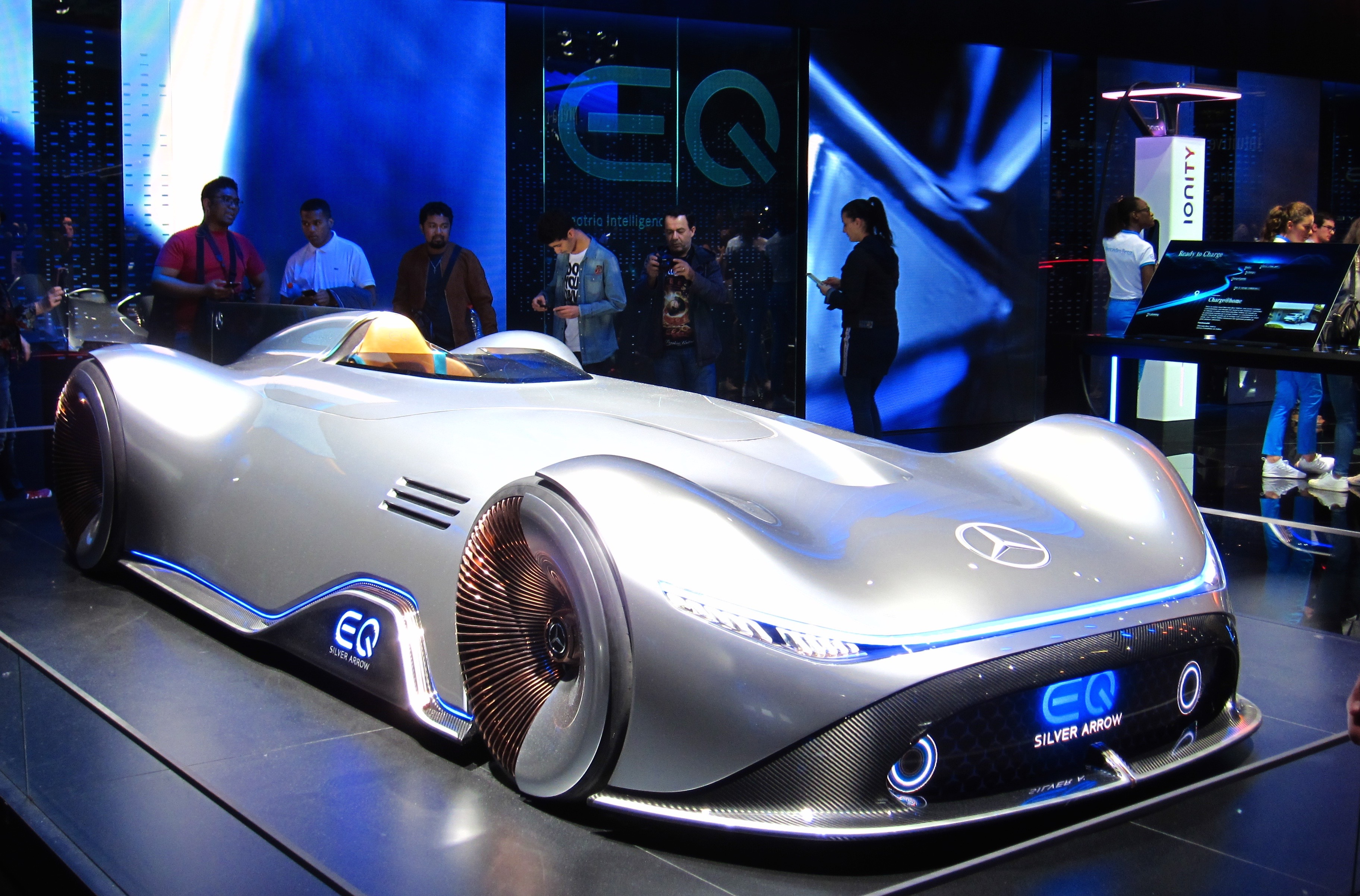
Mercedes Benz EQ Silver Arrow

The EQ Silver Arrow was unveiled at the IAA in Frankfurt in 2019, intended as a futuristic electric racing vehicle concept with an intended top speed of over 400 km/h (249 mph). It features a unique body style reminiscent of the 1950s and 1960s era Mercedes sports coupes and features a single center seat with a front visor for the driver. It also features a front fender LED panel that displays motion lighting.

=== Vision EQXX ===
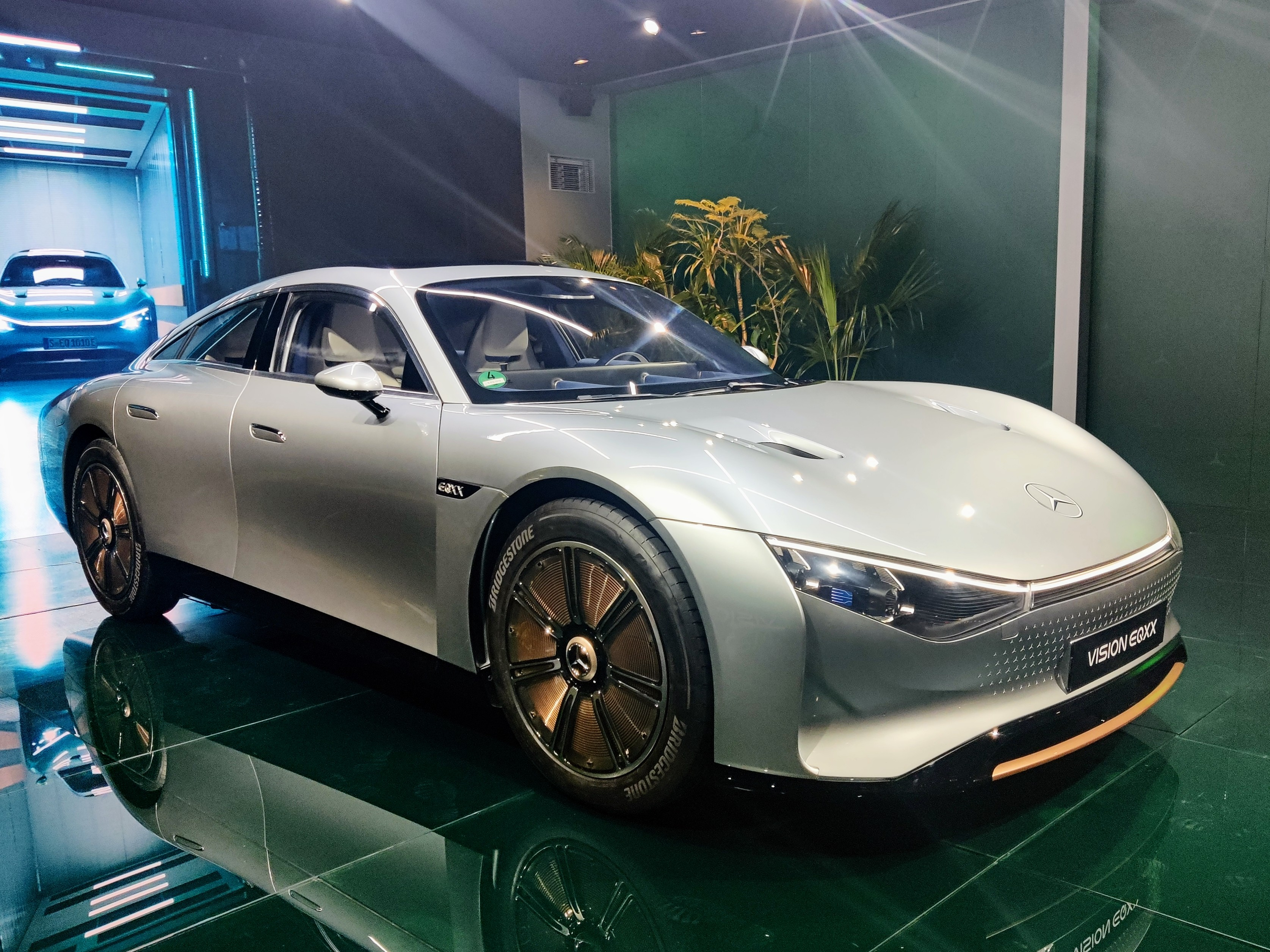
Mercedes-Benz Vision EQXX

Mercedes-Benz plans to go the full-electric route by 2030 and will soon present a concept car to demonstrate its leadership and capabilities when it comes to electric-vehicle technology. Their goal with the EQXX is a range of 1,000 km (621 mi) and part of that is achieved by the slippery body with a drag coefficient of Cd=0.17.

The automaker has already provided glimpses of the concept, known as the Vision EQXX, and in November its R&D chief, Markus Schaefer, confirmed via a LinkedIn post that the reveal will take place on 3 January 2022. The car will highlight the automaker's stand at the Consumer Electronics Show, which kicks off in Las Vegas, Nevada, on 5 January.

== Future ==
Mercedes-Benz phased out the EQ- prefix from its electric vehicles after the first-generation models come to the end of their life cycles, with electric vehicles to instead adopt the ‘with EQ Technology’ suffix. The battery-electric G580 with EQ Technology marked the start of the new EV naming strategy. It will be followed by the battery-electric version of the third-generation CLA as the first vehicle built on the electric-first platform Mercedes-Benz Modular Architecture (MMA). An electric version of the CLA Shooting Brake, and EQA and EQB replacements will be built on the same platform.

Mercedes-Benz cancelled the electric MB.EA Large platform intended to underpin follow-on versions of the Mercedes-Benz EQE and EQS electric sedans and SUVs, instead working on to evolve the EVA2 platform. However, the MB.EA Medium is still in development. The first model built on the MB.EA platform is an all-electric version of the GLC, which will serve as an indirect replacement for the EQC. However, the ICE variant of the GLC will remain on a developed version of the existing MRA architecture.

Electric versions of C-Class, E-Class and S-Class are in development.

== Trademark dispute ==
In March 2017, Chinese automaker Chery filed a complaint with the Trademark Office of the State Administration for Industry and Commerce in China regarding the use of 'EQ', as Chery was using the name 'eQ' for an electric version of its QQ3 city car since 2015. The dispute was resolved in July 2017, with Chery retaining the rights to use 'eQ' with numerical models and Mercedes-Benz to use 'EQ' with alphabetical models.

In May 2018, Mercedes-Benz trademarked the terms EQA, EQB, EQE, EQG, and EQS.

== See also ==
- Audi e-tron
- BMW i
- Honda Ye
- Ioniq
- Toyota bZ
- Volkswagen ID. series
- Kia EV series
