= 2021 London ePrix =

Pair of Formula E electric car races

Race 12 of 15 of the 2020–21 Formula E season
← Previous race	Next race →

Race details
- Date: 24 July 2021
- Official name: 2021 Heineken London E-Prix
- Location: ExCeL London, Royal Docks, Newham, London
- Course: Street circuit
- Course length: 2.252 km (1.399 mi)
- Distance: 33 laps, 74.316 km (46.178 mi)

Pole position
Driver	(United Kingdom) Alex Lynn	Mahindra
- Time: 1:23.245

Fastest lap
Driver	(New Zealand) Mitch Evans (Germany) René Rast (Note: Rast received the point for fastest lap as Evans failed to finish in the top 10.)	Jaguar; Audi
- Time: 1:22.340 (1:22.539) on lap 22 (15)

Podium
First	(United Kingdom) Jake Dennis	Andretti-BMW
Second	(Netherlands) Nyck de Vries	Mercedes
Third	(United Kingdom) Alex Lynn	Mahindra

2021 London ePrix
Race 13 of 15 of the 2020–21 Formula E season
← Previous race	Next race →

Race details
- Date: 25 July 2021
- Official name: 2021 Heineken London E-Prix
- Location: ExCeL London, Royal Docks, Newham, London
- Course: Street circuit
- Course length: 2.252 km (1.399 mi)
- Distance: 30 laps, 67.560 km (41.980 mi)

Pole position
Driver	(Belgium) Stoffel Vandoorne	Mercedes
- Time: 1:20.181

Fastest lap
Driver	(Netherlands) Robin Frijns	Virgin-Audi
- Time: 1:21.635 on lap 17

Podium
First	(United Kingdom) Alex Lynn	Mahindra
Second	(Netherlands) Nyck de Vries	Mercedes
Third	(New Zealand) Mitch Evans	Jaguar

The 2021 London ePrix (formally the 2021 Heineken London E-Prix) was a pair of Formula E electric car races held in and around the ExCeL London centre in the Royal Docks area of the London borough of Newham on 24 and 25 July 2021. The circuit is designed as an indoor-outdoor venue, combining the ExCeL facilities and the surrounding public roads at the Royal Victoria Dock. It marked the twelfth and thirteenth rounds of the 2020–21 Formula E season, as well as the third running of the event, and the first since it was last held in 2016 at Battersea Park.

The first race was won by Jake Dennis, with Nyck de Vries and Alex Lynn rounding out the podium. Alex Lynn took his maiden Formula E victory in the second race, finishing ahead of Nyck de Vries and Mitch Evans, as original race winner Lucas di Grassi was disqualified for failing to serve a drive-through penalty.

This result left 18 drivers in contention for the World Championship coming into the final two races of the season at Berlin.

== Classification ==
=== Race one ===
==== Qualifying ====
Group draw
Group 1	(United Kingdom) BIR (1)	(Portugal) DAC (2)	(Netherlands) FRI (3)	(Switzerland) MOR (4)	(New Zealand) CAS (5)	(France) JEV (6)
Group 2	(Germany) RAS (7)	(New Zealand) EVA (8)	(Germany) WEH (9)	(Netherlands) DEV (10)	(United Kingdom) ROW (11)	(Brazil) DIG (12)
Group 3	(Belgium) VAN (13)	(Germany) GUE (14)	(United Kingdom) DEN (15)	(United Kingdom) SIM (16)	(United Kingdom) LYN (17)	(Germany) LOT (18)
Group 4	(Switzerland) BUE (20)	(France) NAT (21)	(United Kingdom) TUR (22)	(Brazil) SET (23)	(United Kingdom) BLO (24)	(Sweden) ERI (25)

Pos.	No.	Driver	Team	GS	SP	Grid
1	94	(United Kingdom) Alex Lynn	Mahindra	1:23.921	1:23.245	1
2	27	(United Kingdom) Jake Dennis	Andretti-BMW	1:24.032	1:23.544	2
3	23	(Switzerland) Sébastien Buemi	e.dams-Nissan	1:24.124	1:23.627	3
4	7	(Brazil) Sérgio Sette Câmara	Dragon-Penske	1:24.199	1:23.758	4
5	36	(Germany) André Lotterer	Porsche	1:23.900	1:23.863	5
6	71	(France) Norman Nato	Venturi-Mercedes	1:24.329	1:23.912	6
7	11	(Brazil) Lucas di Grassi	Audi	1:24.564	—N/a	7
8	29	(United Kingdom) Alexander Sims	Mahindra	1:24.584	—N/a	8
9	17	(Netherlands) Nyck de Vries	Mercedes	1:24.644	—N/a	9
10	6	(Sweden) Joel Eriksson	Dragon-Penske	1:24.695	—N/a	10
11	20	(New Zealand) Mitch Evans	Jaguar	1:24.820	—N/a	11
12	99	(Germany) Pascal Wehrlein	Porsche	1:24.847	—N/a	12
13	33	(Germany) René Rast	Audi	1:24.913	—N/a	13
14	5	(Belgium) Stoffel Vandoorne	Mercedes	1:25.101	—N/a	14
15	88	(United Kingdom) Tom Blomqvist	NIO	1:25.104	—N/a	15
16	48	(Switzerland) Edoardo Mortara	Venturi-Mercedes	1:25.198	—N/a	16
17	13	(Portugal) António Félix da Costa	Techeetah-DS	1:25.279	—N/a	17
18	10	(United Kingdom) Sam Bird	Jaguar	1:25.366	—N/a	18
19	8	(United Kingdom) Oliver Turvey	NIO	1:25.398	—N/a	19
20	37	(New Zealand) Nick Cassidy	Virgin-Audi	1:25.911	—N/a	20
21	22	(United Kingdom) Oliver Rowland	e.dams-Nissan	1:25.932	—N/a	21
22	4	(Netherlands) Robin Frijns	Virgin-Audi	1:26.009	—N/a	22
23	25	(France) Jean-Éric Vergne	Techeetah-DS	1:26.168	—N/a	23
24	28	(Germany) Maximilian Günther	Andretti-BMW	no time	—N/a	24

==== Race ====
Pos.	No.	Driver	Team	Laps	Time/Retired	Grid	Points
1	27	(United Kingdom) Jake Dennis	Andretti-BMW	33	46:50.048	2	25
2	17	(Netherlands) Nyck de Vries	Mercedes	33	+5.341	9	18
3	94	(United Kingdom) Alex Lynn	Mahindra	33	+6.946	1	15+3^{1}
4	36	(Germany) André Lotterer	Porsche	33	+10.699	5	12+1^{2}
5	33	(Germany) René Rast	Audi	33	+11.427	13	10+1^{3}
6	11	(Brazil) Lucas di Grassi	Audi	33	+12.233	7	8
7	5	(Belgium) Stoffel Vandoorne	Mercedes	33	+17.381	14	6
8	13	(Portugal) António Félix da Costa	Techeetah-DS	33	+18.457	17	4
9	48	(Switzerland) Edoardo Mortara	Venturi-Mercedes	33	+30.724	16	2
10	99	(Germany) Pascal Wehrlein	Porsche	33	+38.240	12	1
11	37	(New Zealand) Nick Cassidy	Virgin-Audi	33	+43.475	20	
12	25	(France) Jean-Éric Vergne	Techeetah-DS	33	+48.025	23	
13	4	(Netherlands) Robin Frijns	Virgin-Audi	33	+51.037^{4}	22	
14	20	(New Zealand) Mitch Evans	Jaguar	33	+57.579	11	
15	8	(United Kingdom) Oliver Turvey	NIO	33	+58.624	19	
16	6	(Sweden) Joel Eriksson	Dragon-Penske	33	+59.945	10	
17	7	(Brazil) Sérgio Sette Câmara	Dragon-Penske	33	+1:00.436	4	
18	28	(Germany) Maximilian Günther	Andretti-BMW	33	+1:05.105^{5}	24	
NC	71	(France) Norman Nato	Venturi-Mercedes	33	Retired in pits^{6}	6	
NC	88	(United Kingdom) Tom Blomqvist	NIO	25	+8 laps	15	
Ret	10	(United Kingdom) Sam Bird	Jaguar	1	Collision damage	18	
Ret	29	(United Kingdom) Alexander Sims	Mahindra	0	Collision damage	8	
DSQ^{7}	23	(Switzerland) Sébastien Buemi	e.dams-Nissan	33	Energy usage	3	
DSQ^{7}	22	(United Kingdom) Oliver Rowland	e.dams-Nissan	33	Energy usage	21	

Notes:

- ^1 – Pole position.
- ^2 – Fastest in group stage.
- ^3 – Fastest lap.
- ^4 – Robin Frijns received a 5-second time penalty for pushing another car into the wall and gaining a position.
- ^5 – Maximilian Günther received a 10-second time penalty for causing a collision.
- ^6 – Norman Nato pulled into the pit lane at the end of the final lap after exceeding the maximum energy usage. As he did not cross the chequered flag, he was not classified.
- ^7 – Sébastien Buemi and Oliver Rowland originally finished 4th and 10th respectively, but were disqualified from the race for exceeding the maximum energy usage.

==== Standings after the race ====
Drivers' Championship standings

	Pos	Driver	Points
	1	(United Kingdom) Sam Bird	81
	2	(Portugal) António Félix da Costa	80
12	3	(United Kingdom) Jake Dennis	79
6	4	(Netherlands) Nyck de Vries	77
2	5	(Netherlands) Robin Frijns	76

Teams' Championship standings

	Pos	Constructor	Points
1	1	(China) Techeetah-DS	148
1	2	(United Kingdom) Virgin-Audi	146
	3	(United Kingdom) Jaguar	141
1	4	(Germany) Mercedes	137
1	5	(Germany) Audi	134

- Notes: Only the top five positions are included for both sets of standings.

=== Race two ===
==== Qualifying ====
Group draw
Group 1	(United Kingdom) BIR (1)	(Portugal) DAC (2)	(United Kingdom) DEN (3)	(Netherlands) DEV (4)	(Netherlands) FRI (5)	(Switzerland) MOR (6)
Group 2	(Germany) RAS (7)	(New Zealand) CAS (8)	(France) JEV (9)	(Brazil) DIG (10)	(Germany) WEH (11)	(Belgium) VAN (12)
Group 3	(New Zealand) EVA (13)	(United Kingdom) ROW (14)	(Germany) GUE (15)	(United Kingdom) LYN (16)	(Germany) LOT (17)	(United Kingdom) SIM (18)
Group 4	(Switzerland) BUE (20)	(France) NAT (21)	(United Kingdom) TUR (22)	(Brazil) SET (23)	(United Kingdom) BLO (24)	(Sweden) ERI (25)

Pos.	No.	Driver	Team	GS	SP	Grid
1	5	(Belgium) Stoffel Vandoorne	Mercedes	1:20.459	1:20.181	1
2	22	(United Kingdom) Oliver Rowland	e.dams-Nissan	1:20.483	1:20.222	2
3	94	(United Kingdom) Alex Lynn	Mahindra	1:20.319	1:20.248	3
4	17	(Netherlands) Nyck de Vries	Mercedes	1:20.511	1:20.353	4
5	20	(New Zealand) Mitch Evans	Jaguar	1:20.321	1:20.376	5
6	28	(Germany) Maximilian Günther	Andretti-BMW	1:20.504	1:20.398	6
7	99	(Germany) Pascal Wehrlein	Porsche	1:20.569	—N/a	7
8	4	(Netherlands) Robin Frijns	Virgin-Audi	1:20.620	—N/a	8
9	7	(Brazil) Sérgio Sette Câmara	Dragon-Penske	1:20.641	—N/a	9
10	11	(Brazil) Lucas di Grassi	Audi	1:20.750	—N/a	10
11	23	(Switzerland) Sébastien Buemi	e.dams-Nissan	1:20.812	—N/a	11
12	33	(Germany) René Rast	Audi	1:20.924	—N/a	12
13	71	(France) Norman Nato	Venturi-Mercedes	1:20.977	—N/a	13
14	88	(United Kingdom) Tom Blomqvist	NIO	1:20.988	—N/a	14
15	6	(Sweden) Joel Eriksson	Dragon-Penske	1:21.010	—N/a	15
16	36	(Germany) André Lotterer	Porsche	1:21.038	—N/a	16
17	27	(United Kingdom) Jake Dennis	Andretti-BMW	1:21.042	—N/a	17
18	37	(New Zealand) Nick Cassidy	Virgin-Audi	1:21.043	—N/a	18
19	29	(United Kingdom) Alexander Sims	Mahindra	1:21.064	—N/a	19
20	48	(Switzerland) Edoardo Mortara	Venturi-Mercedes	1:21.080	—N/a	20
21	10	(United Kingdom) Sam Bird	Jaguar	1:21.108	—N/a	21
22	13	(Portugal) António Félix da Costa	Techeetah-DS	1:21.195	—N/a	22
23	25	(France) Jean-Éric Vergne	Techeetah-DS	1:21.244	—N/a	23
24	8	(United Kingdom) Oliver Turvey	NIO	1:21.847	—N/a	24

==== Race ====
Pos.	No.	Driver	Team	Laps	Time/Retired	Grid	Points
1	94	(United Kingdom) Alex Lynn	Mahindra	30	46:29.532	3	25+1^{1}
2	17	(Netherlands) Nyck de Vries	Mercedes	30	+0.599	4	18
3	20	(New Zealand) Mitch Evans	Jaguar	30	+6.257	5	15
4	4	(Netherlands) Robin Frijns	Virgin-Audi	30	+6.682	8	12+1^{2}
5	99	(Germany) Pascal Wehrlein	Porsche	30	+9.212	7	10
6	28	(Germany) Maximilian Günther	Andretti-BMW	30	+10.637	6	8
7	37	(New Zealand) Nick Cassidy	Virgin-Audi	30	+12.685	18	6
8	7	(Brazil) Sérgio Sette Câmara	Dragon-Penske	30	+19.237	9	4
9	27	(United Kingdom) Jake Dennis	Andretti-BMW	30	+24.914	17	2
10	6	(Sweden) Joel Eriksson	Dragon-Penske	30	+27.920	15	1
11	48	(Switzerland) Edoardo Mortara	Venturi-Mercedes	30	+29.083	20	
12	25	(France) Jean-Éric Vergne	Techeetah-DS	30	+29.915	23	
13	23	(Switzerland) Sébastien Buemi	e.dams-Nissan	30	+30.291	11	
14	8	(United Kingdom) Oliver Turvey	NIO	30	+31.364	24	
15	5	(Belgium) Stoffel Vandoorne	Mercedes	30	+33.623^{4}	1	3^{3}
16	29	(United Kingdom) Alexander Sims	Mahindra	30	+34.336	19	
17	36	(Germany) André Lotterer	Porsche	30	+35.204	16	
18	22	(United Kingdom) Oliver Rowland	e.dams-Nissan	30	+42.269^{5}	2	
19	88	(United Kingdom) Tom Blomqvist	NIO	29	+1 lap	14	
Ret	71	(France) Norman Nato	Venturi-Mercedes	27	Collision	13	
Ret	10	(United Kingdom) Sam Bird	Jaguar	27	Collision	21	
Ret	13	(Portugal) António Félix da Costa	Techeetah-DS	10	Collision damage	22	
Ret	33	(Germany) René Rast	Audi	5	Collision damage	12	
DSQ^{6}	11	(Brazil) Lucas di Grassi	Audi	30	Disqualified	10	

Notes:

- ^1 – Fastest in group stage.
- ^2 – Fastest lap.
- ^3 – Pole position.
- ^4 – Stoffel Vandoorne received a 5-second time penalty for overtaking under yellow flag conditions.
- ^5 – Oliver Rowland received a 5-second time penalty for causing a collision.
- ^6 – Lucas di Grassi originally finished 1st, but was disqualified from the race for failing to respect a drive-through penalty. He had received the penalty for a safety car procedure infringement.

==== Standings after the race ====
Drivers' Championship standings

	Pos	Driver	Points
3	1	(Netherlands) Nyck de Vries	95
3	2	(Netherlands) Robin Frijns	89
2	3	(United Kingdom) Sam Bird	81
1	4	(United Kingdom) Jake Dennis	81
2	5	(Portugal) António Félix da Costa	80

Teams' Championship standings

	Pos	Constructor	Points
1	1	(United Kingdom) Virgin-Audi	165
2	2	(Germany) Mercedes	158
	3	(United Kingdom) Jaguar	156
3	4	(China) Techeetah-DS	148
1	5	(United States) Andretti-BMW	143

- Notes: Only the top five positions are included for both sets of standings.

== Notes ==
Previous race: 2021 New York City ePrix	FIA Formula E World Championship; 2020–21 season	Next race: 2021 Berlin ePrix
Previous race: 2016 London ePrix	London ePrix	Next race: 2022 London ePrix
