= London ePrix =

Electric motorsport race

- ExCel London (2023–2026)
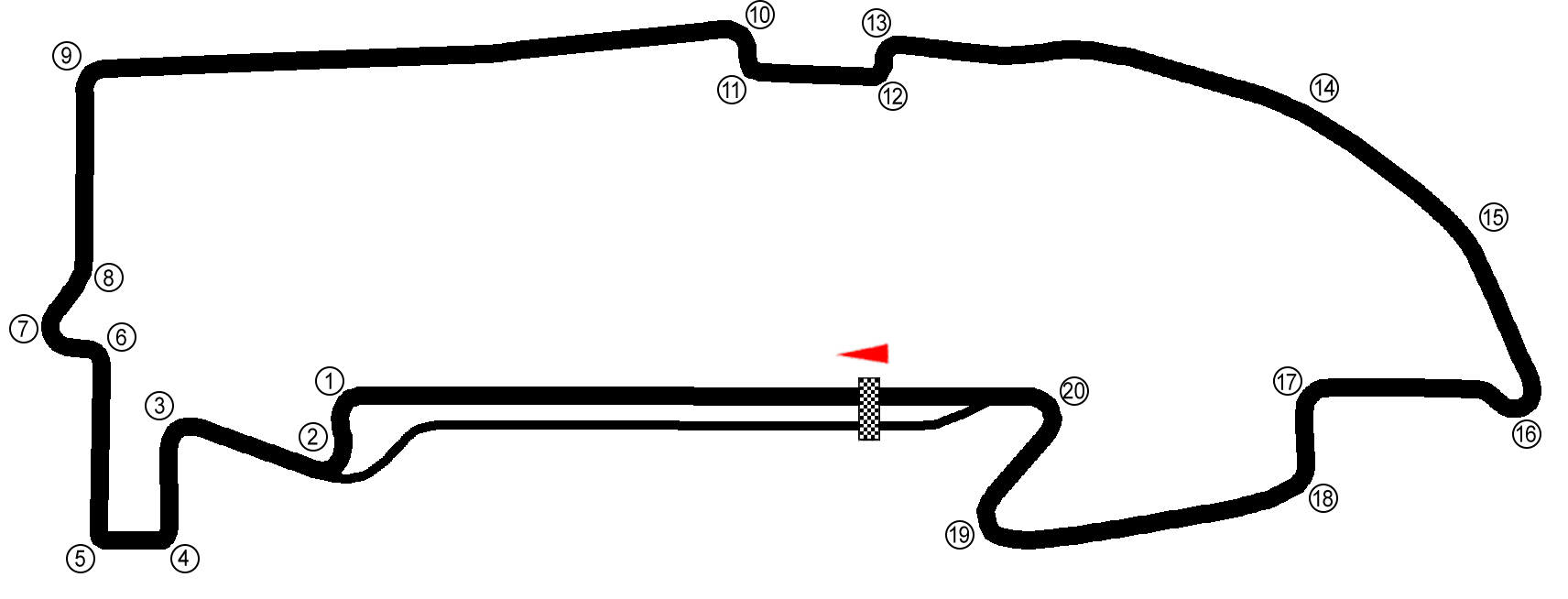

Race information
- Number of times held: 8
- First held: 2015
- Most wins (drivers): (New Zealand) Nick Cassidy (3)
- Most wins (constructors): (France) e.Dams-Renault (United Kingdom) Jaguar (3)
- Circuit length: 2.09 km (1.30 miles)

Last race (2026 Race 2)

Pole position
- (Netherlands) Nyck de Vries; Mahindra; 1:06.925

Podium
- 1. (United Kingdom) Taylor Barnard; DS Penske; 42:19.363; 2. (Netherlands) Nyck De Vries; Mahindra; +0.614; 3. (Switzerland) Edoardo Mortara; Mahindra; +6.087

Fastest lap
- (United Kingdom) Dan Ticktum; Cupra Kiro-Porsche; 1:08:135

The London ePrix is an annual race of the single-seater, electrically powered Formula E championship, held in London, United Kingdom. It was first raced in the 2014–15 season until the 2015–16 season. The event was originally meant to return for the 2019–20 season at a new location around (and through) ExCeL London before being cancelled due to the COVID-19 pandemic. The event at the new location was eventually held in the following season.

== Circuits ==
=== Battersea Park Circuit ===
The first two editions of the London ePrix took place at the Battersea Park Street Circuit, a temporary street circuit at Battersea Park in London, England. The track was 2.922 km (1.816 mi) in length and featured 17 turns. The track was designed by Formula E's London event team and British architect Simon Gibbons.

=== Royal Victoria Dock/ExCeL ===
For the 2019–20 season, the London ePrix was scheduled to be held around and through the ExCeL London and around the Royal Victoria Dock. The 2.252 km (1.399 mi) layout, featuring 23 turns, became Formula E's first "indoor/outdoor" track.

However, the calendar was adjusted due to the COVID-19 pandemic before being cancelled. The London ePrix finally returned in the 2020–21 season, this time as a double header.

Before the 2022 London ePrix, the circuit length was decreased to 2.141 km (1.330 mi) by removing the two hairpins at turns 10 and 11 and replacing them with a bus stop chicane. The layout was further changed for the 2023 London ePrix, removing the old turns 17 and 18 to create a straight and reducing the length of the circuit to 2.09 km (1.30 mi).

For the 2023 season finale the circuit was changed again with the hairpin at turn 16 removed and turns 17-18 being taken out as well as the track was designed to run around the construction work of the ExCeL’s new ICC Expansion. Therefore the outside grandstands were removed and replaced with a standing viewing platform for fans.

=== Brands Hatch ===
The event will be moved to Brands Hatch in 2027. Chicanes will be added onto the track.

== Layout evolution ==
Track layouts
Battersea Park Street Circuit (2015–2016)

Original layout of the ExCel London Circuit (2021)

2022 layout of the ExCel London Circuit

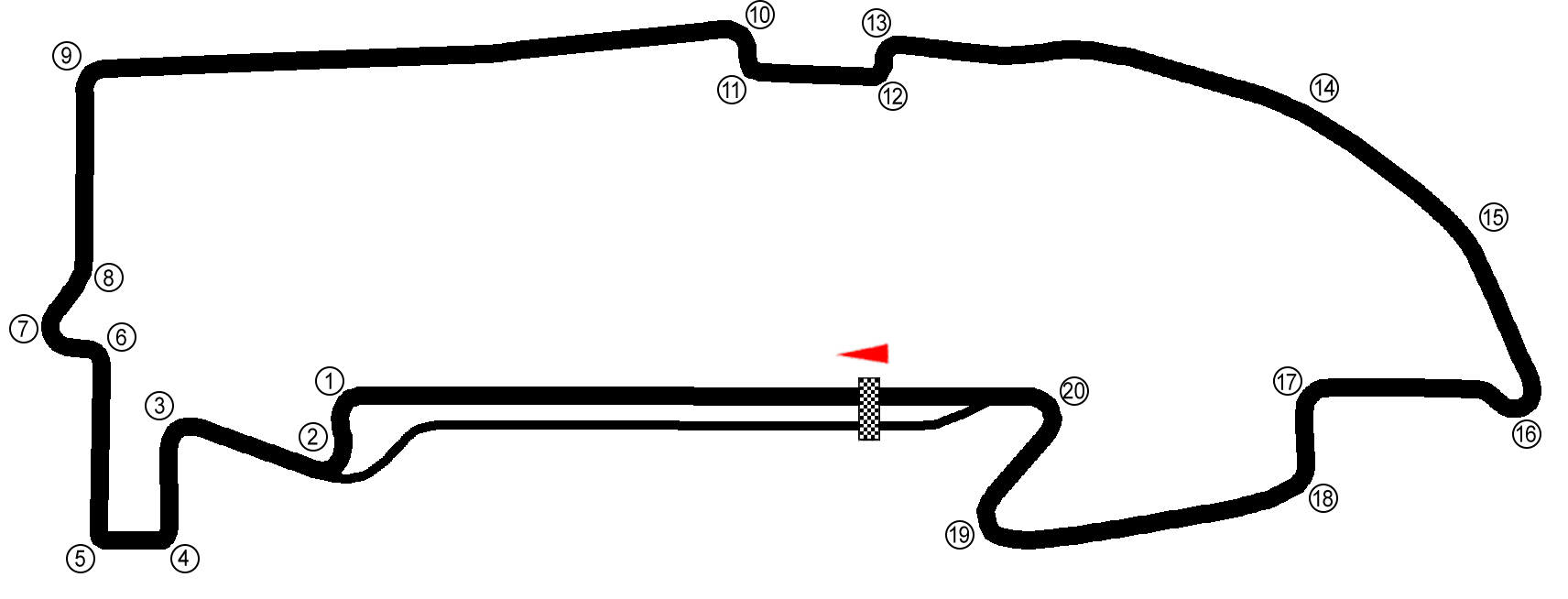
2023 layout of the ExCel London Circuit (2023–2026)

== Results ==
Edition	Track	Winner	Second	Third	Pole position	Fastest lap	Ref
2015 Race 1	Battersea Park	(Switzerland) Sébastien Buemi e.dams-Renault	(Belgium) Jérôme d'Ambrosio; Dragon Racing	(France) Jean-Éric Vergne; Andretti Autosport	(Switzerland) Sébastien Buemi e.dams-Renault	(Brazil) Lucas di Grassi; Audi Sport ABT	
2015 Race 2	Battersea Park	(United Kingdom) Sam Bird; Virgin Racing	(Belgium) Jérôme d'Ambrosio; Dragon Racing	(France) Loïc Duval; Dragon Racing	(France) Stéphane Sarrazin; Venturi	(United Kingdom) Sam Bird; Virgin Racing	
2016 Race 1	Battersea Park	(France) Nico Prost; Renault e.dams	(Brazil) Bruno Senna; Mahindra Racing	(France) Jean-Éric Vergne; DS Virgin Racing	(France) Nico Prost; Renault e.dams	(Brazil) Nelson Piquet Jr. NEXTEV TCR	
2016 Race 2	Battersea Park	(France) Nico Prost; Renault e.dams	(Germany) Daniel Abt; Audi Sport ABT	(Belgium) Jérôme d'Ambrosio; Dragon Racing	(Switzerland) Sébastien Buemi; Renault e.dams	(Switzerland) Sébastien Buemi; Renault e.dams	
2021 Race 1	ExCel London	(United Kingdom) Jake Dennis; Andretti-BMW	(Netherlands) Nyck de Vries; Mercedes-EQ	(United Kingdom) Alex Lynn; Mahindra Racing	(United Kingdom) Alex Lynn; Mahindra Racing	(Germany) René Rast; Audi	
2021 Race 2	ExCel London	(United Kingdom) Alex Lynn; Mahindra Racing	(Netherlands) Nyck de Vries; Mercedes-EQ	(New Zealand) Mitch Evans; Jaguar Racing	(Belgium) Stoffel Vandoorne; Mercedes-EQ	(Netherlands) Robin Frijns; Virgin-Audi	
2022 Race 1	ExCel London	(United Kingdom) Jake Dennis; Avalanche Andretti	(Belgium) Stoffel Vandoorne; Mercedes-EQ	(New Zealand) Nick Cassidy; Envision Racing	(United Kingdom) Jake Dennis; Avalanche Andretti	(United Kingdom) Jake Dennis; Avalanche Andretti	
2022 Race 2	ExCel London	(Brazil) Lucas di Grassi; ROKiT Venturi Racing	(United Kingdom) Jake Dennis; Avalanche Andretti	(Netherlands) Nyck de Vries; Mercedes-EQ	(United Kingdom) Jake Dennis; Avalanche Andretti	(New Zealand) Nick Cassidy; Envision Racing	
2023 Race 1	ExCel London	(New Zealand) Mitch Evans; Jaguar TCS Racing	(United Kingdom) Jake Dennis; Avalanche Andretti	(Switzerland) Sébastian Buemi; Envision Racing	(New Zealand) Mitch Evans; Jaguar TCS Racing	(Germany) André Lotterer; Avalanche Andretti	
2023 Race 2	ExCel London	(New Zealand) Nick Cassidy; Envision Racing	(New Zealand) Mitch Evans; Jaguar TCS Racing	(United Kingdom) Jake Dennis; Avalanche Andretti	(New Zealand) Nick Cassidy; Envision Racing	(United Kingdom) Jake Dennis; Avalanche Andretti	
2024 Race 1	ExCel London	(Germany) Pascal Wehrlein; TAG Heuer Porsche Formula E Team	(New Zealand) Mitch Evans; Jaguar TCS Racing	(Switzerland) Sébastian Buemi; Envision Racing	(New Zealand) Mitch Evans; Jaguar TCS Racing	(New Zealand) Mitch Evans; Jaguar TCS Racing	
2024 Race 2	ExCel London	(United Kingdom) Oliver Rowland; Nissan Formula E Team	(Germany) Pascal Wehrlein; TAG Heuer Porsche Formula E Team	(New Zealand) Mitch Evans; Jaguar TCS Racing	(New Zealand) Nick Cassidy; Jaguar TCS Racing	(United Kingdom) Jake Hughes; NEOM McLaren Formula E Team	
2025 Race 1	ExCel London	(New Zealand) Nick Cassidy; Jaguar TCS Racing	(Netherlands) Nyck de Vries; Mahindra Racing	(Germany) Pascal Wehrlein; TAG Heuer Porsche Formula E Team	(New Zealand) Mitch Evans; Jaguar TCS Racing	(Germany) Pascal Wehrlein; TAG Heuer Porsche Formula E Team	
2025 Race 2	ExCel London	(New Zealand) Nick Cassidy; Jaguar TCS Racing	(Netherlands) Nyck de Vries; Mahindra Racing	(Switzerland) Sébastian Buemi; Envision Racing	(United Kingdom) Dan Ticktum; Cupra Kiro	(New Zealand) Nick Cassidy; Jaguar TCS Racing	
2026 Race 1	ExCel London	(Germany) Pascal Wehrlein; Porsche Formula E Team	(United Kingdom) Jake Dennis; Andretti Formula E	(Portugal) António Félix da Costa; Jaguar TCS Racing	(Germany) Pascal Wehrlein; Porsche Formula E Team	(United Kingdom) Oliver Rowland; Nissan Formula E Team	
2026 Race 2	ExCel London	(United Kingdom) Taylor Barnard; DS Penske	(Netherlands) Nyck de Vries; Mahindra Racing	(Switzerland) Edoardo Mortara; Mahindra Racing	(Netherlands) Nyck de Vries; Mahindra Racing	(United Kingdom) Dan Ticktum; Cupra Kiro	

=== Repeat winners (drivers) ===
Wins	Driver	Years won
3	(New Zealand) Nick Cassidy	2023 (Race 2), 2025
2	(France) Nico Prost	2016
2	(United Kingdom) Jake Dennis	2021 (Race 1), 2022 (Race 1)
2	(Germany) Pascal Wehrlein	2024 (Race 1), 2026 (Race 1)

=== Repeat winners (teams) ===
Wins	Team	Years won
3	(France) e.dams-Renault	2015 (Race 1), 2016
3	(United Kingdom) Jaguar Racing	2023 (Race 1), 2025
2	(United States) Andretti	2021 (Race 1), 2022 (R1)
2	(United Kingdom) Porsche	2024 (Race 1), 2026 (R1)
