= 2016 London ePrix =

The 2016 London ePrix (formally the 2016 FIA Formula E Visa London ePrix) were two Formula E motor races that took place on the 2–3 July 2016 on the Battersea Park Street Circuit in Battersea Park, London. They were the ninth and tenth rounds of the 2015–16 Formula E season, the last of the second season of Formula E. They were also the 20th and 21st Formula E races overall and this was the second edition of the London ePrix. Prior to the race it was announced by Formula E that the races would not take place in Battersea Park in future years and that a street circuit location would be sought. This followed a High Court challenge to the race taking place in a public park and the way that Wandsworth Council had acted to continue the races despite opposition from park users. The court case against the Council was withdrawn after an agreement was reached between the claimant and Formula E that the 2016 race would be the last. For the 2019–20 season, the race was due to return, but at ExCeL London, however the race was cancelled in response to the COVID-19 pandemic. It eventually returned on the 2020–21 season.

== Background ==
Lucas di Grassi and Sébastien Buemi entered the finale of the season as title contenders with only one point splitting the two. With 60 points to grasp in the final two rounds, Sam Bird was also mathematically in contention of the title.

== Race One ==
2016 London ePrix
Race 9 of 10 of the 2015–16 Formula E season
← Previous race
- Layout of the Battersea Park Street Circuit

Race details
- Date: 2 July 2016
- Official name: Visa London ePrix
- Location: Battersea Park Street Circuit, Battersea, London, United Kingdom
- Course: Temporary circuit
- Course length: 2.925 km (1.818 miles)
- Distance: 33 laps, 96.5 km (60.0 miles)

Pole position
Driver	(France) Nico Prost	Renault e.dams
- Time: 1:23.247

Fastest lap
Driver	(Brazil) Nelson Piquet Jr.	NEXTEV
- Time: 1:25.783 on lap 29

Podium
First	(France) Nico Prost	Renault e.dams
Second	(Brazil) Bruno Senna	Mahindra Racing
Third	(France) Jean-Éric Vergne	DS Virgin Racing

=== Qualifying results ===
Pos.	No.	Driver	Team	GS	SP	Grid
1	8	(France) Nico Prost	Renault e.Dams	1:23.247	1:27.192	1
2	88	(Brazil) Bruno Senna	Mahindra Racing	1:24.279	1:27.758	2
3	21	(United Kingdom) Oliver Turvey	NextEV TCR	1:23.969	1:28.284	3
4	27	(Netherlands) Robin Frijns	Amlin Andretti	1:24.363	1:29.500	4
5	25	(France) Jean-Éric Vergne	DS Virgin Racing	1:26.799	—	5
6	66	(Germany) Daniel Abt	ABT Schaeffler Audi Sport	1:29.814	—N/a	6
7	2	(United Kingdom) Sam Bird	DS Virgin Racing	1:30.453	—N/a	7
8	23	(Germany) Nick Heidfeld	Mahindra Racing	1:32.367	—N/a	8
9	4	(France) Stéphane Sarrazin	Venturi Formula E Team	1:33.660	—N/a	15^{1}
10	6	(France) Loïc Duval	Dragon Racing	1:35.315	—N/a	9
11	11	(Brazil) Lucas di Grassi	ABT Schaeffler Audi Sport	1:35.711	—N/a	10
12	7	(Belgium) Jérôme d'Ambrosio	Dragon Racing	1:35.727	—N/a	11
13	77	(China) Ma Qing Hua	Team Aguri	1:36.748	—N/a	16^{1}
14	9	(Switzerland) Sébastien Buemi	Renault e.Dams	1:36.771	—N/a	12
15	12	(United Kingdom) Mike Conway	Venturi Formula E Team	1:37.562	—N/a	13
16	55	(Portugal) António Félix da Costa	Team Aguri	1:38.501	—N/a	14
17	1	(Brazil) Nelson Piquet Jr.	NextEV TCR	1:38.922	—N/a	18^{1}
18	28	(Switzerland) Simona de Silvestro	Amlin Andretti	1:50.455	—N/a	17^{2}

Notes

^1- Stéphane Sarrazin, Ma Qing Hua and Nelson Piquet Jr. were handed grid penalties due to mechanical changes.

^2- Simona de Silvestro did not set a full power lap.

=== Race results ===
Pos.	No.	Driver	Team	Laps	Time/Retired	Grid	Points
1	8	(France) Nico Prost	Renault e.dams	33	53:56.683	1	25+3^{3}
2	21	(Brazil) Bruno Senna	Mahindra Racing	33	+5.244	2	18
3	25	(France) Jean-Éric Vergne	DS Virgin Racing	33	+8.195	5	15
4	11	(Brazil) Lucas di Grassi	Audi Sport ABT	33	+8.914	11	12
5	9	(Switzerland) Sébastien Buemi	Renault e.dams	33	+10.052	14	10
6	55	(Portugal) António Félix da Costa	Team Aguri	33	+10.908	16	8
7	2	(United Kingdom) Sam Bird	DS Virgin Racing	33	+10.986	7	6
8	7	(Belgium) Jérôme d'Ambrosio	Dragon Racing	33	+12.106	12	4
9	12	(United Kingdom) Mike Conway	Venturi	33	+12.456	15	2
10	4	(France) Stéphane Sarrazin	Venturi	33	+15.918	9	1
11	77	(China) Ma Qing Hua	Team Aguri	33	+38.400	13	
12	1	(Brazil) Nelson Piquet Jr.	NextEV TCR	33	+52.028	17	2^{4}
13	23	(Germany) Nick Heidfeld	Mahindra Racing	33	+1:01.264^{5}	8	
14	28	(Switzerland) Simona de Silvestro	Amlin Andretti	33	+1:03.079^{6}	18	
15	88	(United Kingdom) Oliver Turvey	NextEV TCR	30	Accident	3	
Ret	6	(France) Loïc Duval	Dragon Racing	23	Electronics	10	
Ret	27	(Netherlands) Robin Frijns	Amlin Andretti	19	Accident	4	
Ret	66	(Germany) Daniel Abt	Audi Sport ABT	19	Accident	6	

Notes

- ^3 – Three points for pole position.
- ^4 – Two points for fastest lap.
- ^5 - Nick Heidfeld received a drive through penalty converted into a 50-seconds time penalty for using the fanboost twice.
- ^6 - Simona de Silvestro received a drive through penalty converted into a 50-seconds time penalty for exceeding the maximum energy.

=== Standings after the race ===
Drivers' Championship standings

+/–	Pos	Driver	Points
	1	(Brazil) Lucas di Grassi	153
	2	(Switzerland) Sébastien Buemi	150
2	3	(France) Nicolas Prost	90
1	4	(United Kingdom) Sam Bird	88
1	5	(Belgium) Jérôme d'Ambrosio	68

Teams' Championship standings

+/–	Pos	Constructor	Points
	1	(France) e.Dams-Renault	240
	2	(Germany) Audi Sport ABT	203
	3	(United Kingdom) Virgin	140
	4	(United States) Dragon	114
	5	(India) Mahindra	95

- Notes: Only the top five positions are included for both sets of standings.

== Race Two ==
2016 London ePrix
Race 10 of 10 of the 2015–16 Formula E season
← Previous race
- Layout of the Battersea Park Street Circuit

Race details
- Date: 3 July 2016
- Official name: Visa London ePrix
- Location: Battersea Park Street Circuit, Battersea, London, United Kingdom
- Course: Temporary circuit
- Course length: 2.925 km (1.818 miles)
- Distance: 33 laps, 96.5 km (60.0 miles)

Pole position
Driver	(Switzerland) Sébastien Buemi	Renault e.dams
- Time: 1:22.033

Fastest lap
Driver	(Switzerland) Sébastien Buemi	Renault e.dams
- Time: 1:24.150 on lap 16

Podium
First	(France) Nico Prost	Renault e.dams
Second	(Germany) Daniel Abt	ABT Schaeffler
Third	(Belgium) Jérôme d'Ambrosio	Dragon Racing

=== Qualifying results ===
Buemi took the pole position for race two. He was level-headed with di Grassi, who would start in third, ahead of the race in terms of the championship points.

Pos.	No.	Driver	Team	GS	SP	Grid
1	9	(Switzerland) Sébastien Buemi	Renault e.Dams	1:22.106	1:22.033	1
2	8	(France) Nico Prost	Renault e.Dams	1:22.878	1:22.948	2
3	11	(Brazil) Lucas di Grassi	ABT Schaeffler Audi Sport	1:23.245	1:22.975	3
4	88	(United Kingdom) Oliver Turvey	NextEV TCR	1:23.183	1:23.685	4
5	23	(Germany) Nick Heidfeld	Mahindra Racing	1:23.343	1:24.827	5
6	66	(Germany) Daniel Abt	ABT Schaeffler Audi Sport	1:23.494	—N/a	6
7	25	(France) Jean-Éric Vergne	DS Virgin Racing	1:23.783	—N/a	7
8	2	(United Kingdom) Sam Bird	DS Virgin Racing	1:23.930	—N/a	8
9	1	(Brazil) Nelson Piquet Jr.	NextEV TCR	1:23.937	—N/a	9
10	6	(France) Loïc Duval	Dragon Racing	1:23.938	—N/a	10
11	7	(Belgium) Jérôme d'Ambrosio	Dragon Racing	1:23.952	—N/a	11
12	12	(United Kingdom) Mike Conway	Venturi Formula E Team	1:24.054	—N/a	12
13	21	(Brazil) Bruno Senna	Mahindra Racing	1:24.171	—N/a	13
14	55	(Portugal) António Félix da Costa	Team Aguri	1:24.273	—N/a	14
15	4	(France) Stephane Sarrazin	Venturi Formula E Team	1:24.311	—N/a	15
16	27	(Netherlands) Robin Frijns	Amlin Andretti	1:24.655	—N/a	16
17	28	(Switzerland) Simona de Silvestro	Amlin Andretti	1:24.823	—N/a	17
18	77	(China) Ma Qing Hua	Team Aguri	1:26.259	—N/a	18

=== Race results ===
The race start saw a controversial move by di Grassi on Buemi. The ABT collided with the Renault as di Grassi tried to out-brake the Renaults. Both cars were out of the race in turn 2. If neither of the two drivers scored points, di Grassi would secure the drivers' championship by an extra 3rd place finish. However, as the second cars were still available, both drivers returned to the race trying to get the fastest lap, which would award an extra 2 points. It was impossible to finish the full distance of the race. Buemi has run a faster fastest lap than di Grassi and thus secured the championship.

The race was won by Buemi's teammate Nico Prost. It was Prost's third and final race victory in Formula E. The race win also helped secure the Team's title for Renault e.dams.

Pos.	No.	Driver	Team	Laps	Time/Retired	Grid	Points
1	8	(France) Nico Prost	Renault e.dams	33	56:32.649	2	25
2	66	(Germany) Daniel Abt	Audi Sport ABT	33	+7.633	6	18
3	7	(Belgium) Jérôme d'Ambrosio	Dragon Racing	33	+22.524	11	15
4	6	(France) Loïc Duval	Dragon Racing	33	+23.290	10	12
5	4	(France) Stéphane Sarrazin	Venturi	33	+24.984	15	10
6	21	(Brazil) Bruno Senna	Mahindra Racing	33	+27.174	13	8
7	23	(Germany) Nick Heidfeld	Mahindra Racing	33	+1:07.544^{9}	5	6
8	25	(France) Jean-Éric Vergne	DS Virgin Racing	33	+1:08.002^{9} ^{10}	7	4
9	1	(Brazil) Nelson Piquet Jr.	NextEV TCR	33	+1:14.270	9	2
10	88	(United Kingdom) Oliver Turvey	NextEV TCR	33	+1:22.216	4	1
11	55	(Portugal) António Félix da Costa	Team Aguri	33	+1:58.324^{9} ^{11}	14	
12	77	(China) Ma Qing Hua	Team Aguri	32	+1 Lap	18	
13	12	(United Kingdom) Mike Conway	Venturi	32	+1 Lap	12	
Ret	11	(Brazil) Lucas di Grassi	Audi Sport ABT	18	Retired	3	
Ret	9	(Switzerland) Sébastien Buemi	Renault e.dams	16	Retired	1	2+3^{7} ^{8}
Ret	27	(Netherlands) Robin Frijns	Amlin Andretti	11	Accident	16	
Ret	28	(Switzerland) Simona de Silvestro	Amlin Andretti	9	Accident	17	
Ret	2	(United Kingdom) Sam Bird	DS Virgin Racing	6	Throttle	8	

Notes

- ^7 – Three points for pole position.
- ^8 – Two points for fastest lap.
- ^9 - Nick Heidfeld, Jean-Éric Vergne and António Félix da Costa received a drive through penalty converted into a 50-seconds time penalty for exceeding the maximum energy.
- ^10 - Jean-Éric Vergne received a 1-second time penalty for an unsafe release.
- ^11 - António Félix da Costa received a drive through penalty converted into a 50-seconds time penalty for driving off the track.

=== Standings after the race ===
Drivers' Championship standings

+/–	Pos	Driver	Points
1	1	(Switzerland) Sébastien Buemi	155
1	2	(Brazil) Lucas di Grassi	153
	3	(France) Nicolas Prost	115
	4	(United Kingdom) Sam Bird	88
	5	(Belgium) Jérôme d'Ambrosio	83

Teams' Championship standings

+/–	Pos	Constructor	Points
	1	(France) e.Dams-Renault	270
	2	(Germany) Audi Sport ABT	221
	3	(United Kingdom) Virgin	144
	4	(United States) Dragon	143
	5	(India) Mahindra	105

- Notes: Only the top five positions are included for both sets of standings.

Previous race: 2016 Berlin ePrix	FIA Formula E Championship; 2015–16 season	Next race: 2016 Hong Kong ePrix
Previous race: 2015 London ePrix	London ePrix	Next race: 2021 London ePrix
