= Excel London =

Exhibitions and international convention centre in the London Borough of Newham

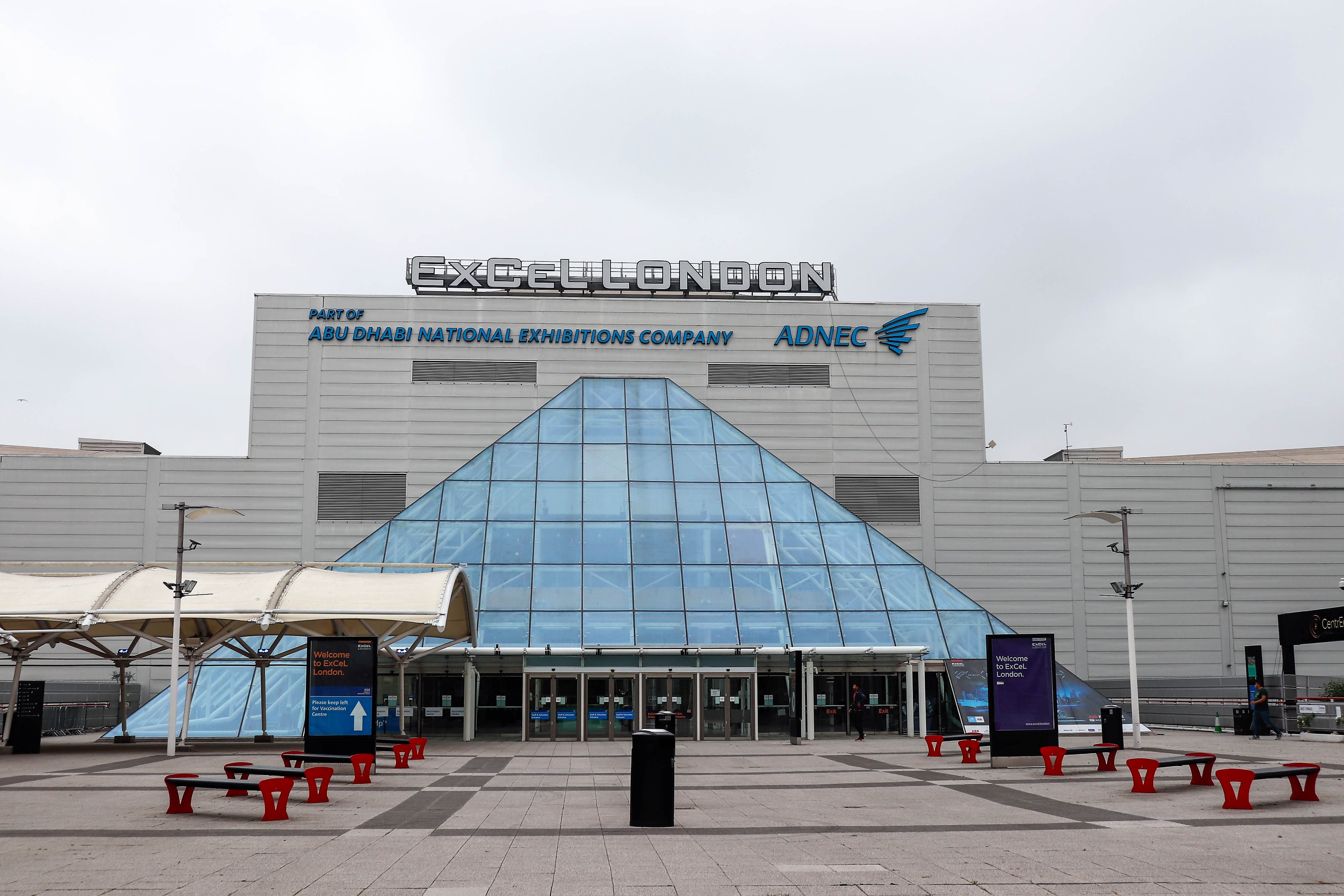
- Excel London in June 2021
- Interactive map of Excel London
- Former names: The Excel
- Location: Custom House, London, England
- Coordinates: 51°30′29″N 0°01′44″E
- Owner: Abu Dhabi National Exhibitions Company
- Public transit: Custom House; Prince Regent

Construction
- Built: November 2000
- Opened: November 2000; 26 years ago
- Renovated: 2010
- Expanded: 2010 (Phase 2); 2023–2024 (Phase 3)
- Cost: £550 million
- Architects: Sir Robert McAlpine; Moxley Architects Ltd.

Website
- www.excel.london

Excel London (formerly styled as ExCeL, an abbreviation for Exhibition Centre London) is an international exhibition and convention centre in the Custom House area of Newham, East London. The facility is situated on a 100-acre (0.40 km^{2}) site on the northern quay of the Royal Victoria Dock in London Docklands, located between Canary Wharf and London City Airport.

== History ==
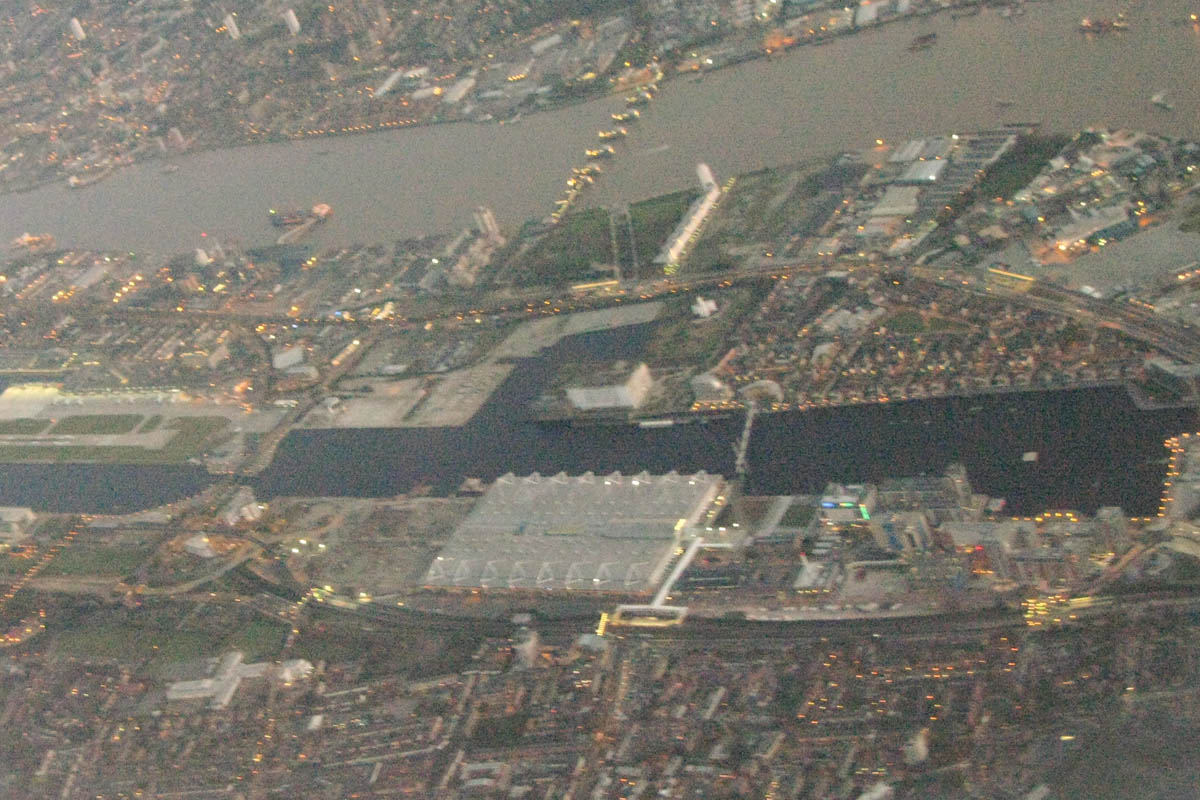
Aerial view of Excel in 2008, before its first extension

The centre was designed by Moxley Architects and built by Sir Robert McAlpine. It opened in November 2000. In May 2008 it was acquired by Abu Dhabi National Exhibitions Company. Phase II of development, which included building London's first International Convention Centre (ICC) and creating an "eastern arrival experience", was completed on 1 May 2010. Phase 3 was completed in late 2024.

In 2015, CentrEd at Excel was opened, which expanded the centre's facilities to incorporate training and meeting space near the western entrance of the venue overlooking Royal Victoria Dock.

The Royal Victoria was closed to commercial traffic in 1981, but it is still accessible to shipping. The centre's waterfront location allows visiting vessels to moor alongside the centre. An example of this is HMS Sutherland visiting the 2005 London Boat Show.

The design of the exhibition building consists of two column-free, rectangular, sub-divisible halls of approximately 479,493 sq. ft. (44,546 sq. m.), on either side of a central boulevard containing catering facilities and information points. There are also three sets of function rooms, one overlooking the water, another above the western end of the central boulevard, and the third on the north side of the building which are used for smaller meetings, seminars, presentations and corporate hospitality. The property is surrounded by six hotels, bars and restaurants, and 1,800 parking spaces situated underneath the property with 85 accessible spaces.

Excel London has hosted numerous consumer and trade, private and public events, including exhibitions, conferences, concerts, weddings and religious events. Among these have been WorldSkills London 2011, the London Boat Show, the British International Motor Show, Grand Designs Live, MCM London Comic Con, the London International Music Show, The Clothes Show London, Defence Security and Equipment International (DSEi) and the 2009 G-20 London Summit.

In 2012, Excel hosted several events for the Olympics and Paralympics, and has since erected a "legacy wall" featuring the handprints of athletes who won Gold at the venue and the former Mayor of London Boris Johnson.

In 2014 Excel hosted the Global Summit to End Sexual Violence in Conflict, chaired by American actress and UN Special Envoy Angelina Jolie and attended by 79 ministers from 123 country delegations.

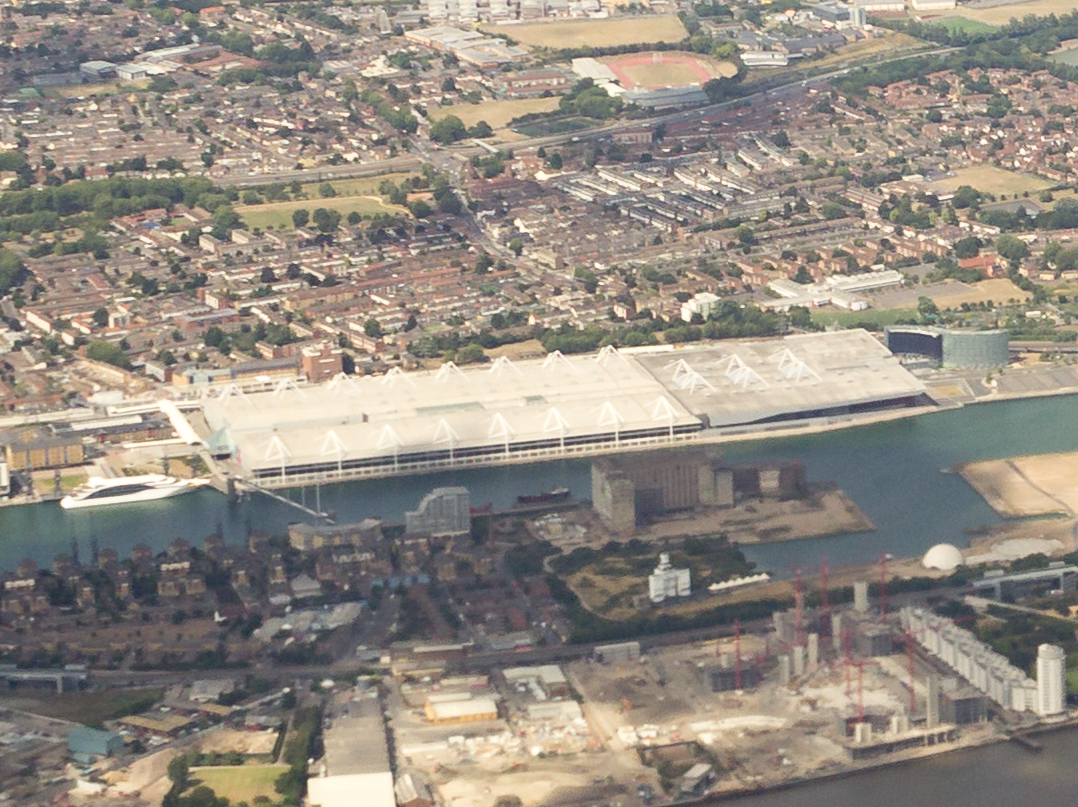
Aerial view of Excel in 2015, after its Phase 2 extension

From 1 to 8 July 2019, 150 events took place as part of London Climate Action Week 2019.

It was announced on 24 March 2020 that the centre was to be temporarily converted into the 4,000-bed NHS Nightingale Hospital as part of the response to the 2020 coronavirus (COVID-19) pandemic. Military engineers and contractors supported the erection of the facility, and army medics assisted the NHS nurses, doctors and other staff. The Nightingale was opened on 3 April 2020 by Charles, Prince of Wales via video link.

== Transport ==
Excel London is served by two Docklands Light Railway (DLR) stations, which span the full 600-metre (2,000 ft) length of the venue. The western entrance is directly linked to Custom House for Excel station, which serves the Platinum Suite and the event halls and is located next to the glass pyramid. Since 24 May 2022, the western entrance of Excel has been served by the Elizabeth line (known as the Crossrail project during construction), connecting the venue to central London in 12 minutes.

The eastern entrance is connected to Prince Regent station. The eastern entrance serves the International Convention Centre (ICC at Excel), which was opened in 2010 by then-Mayor Boris Johnson and is London's first and currently only ICC. During major shows with large visitor attendances, extra shuttle trains are run between the venue and Canning Town station, which connects with London Underground's Jubilee line. Since June 2012, the London cable car now links Excel to The O_{2} on the Greenwich Peninsula.

Excel London is also located near London City Airport station, which is linked by the DLR and a number of dual-carriageway roads which also provide onward access to the office and commercial district of Canary Wharf.

== Sustainability ==
Excel London participates in the UN Global Compact Scheme, the world's largest corporate sustainability initiative which invites companies to align with universal principles on human rights, labour, environment and anti-corruption. As part of this scheme, Excel hosts annual events to communicate on progress addressing the issues of Human Rights, Labour, Environment and Anti-Corruption. Since joining the scheme on 17 August 2007, Excel has undertaken a series of initiatives to reduce energy usage, increase recycling efforts and increase transparency across the business, such as the introduction of a whistleblowing hotline in May 2015.

== Sport ==
=== Olympics ===
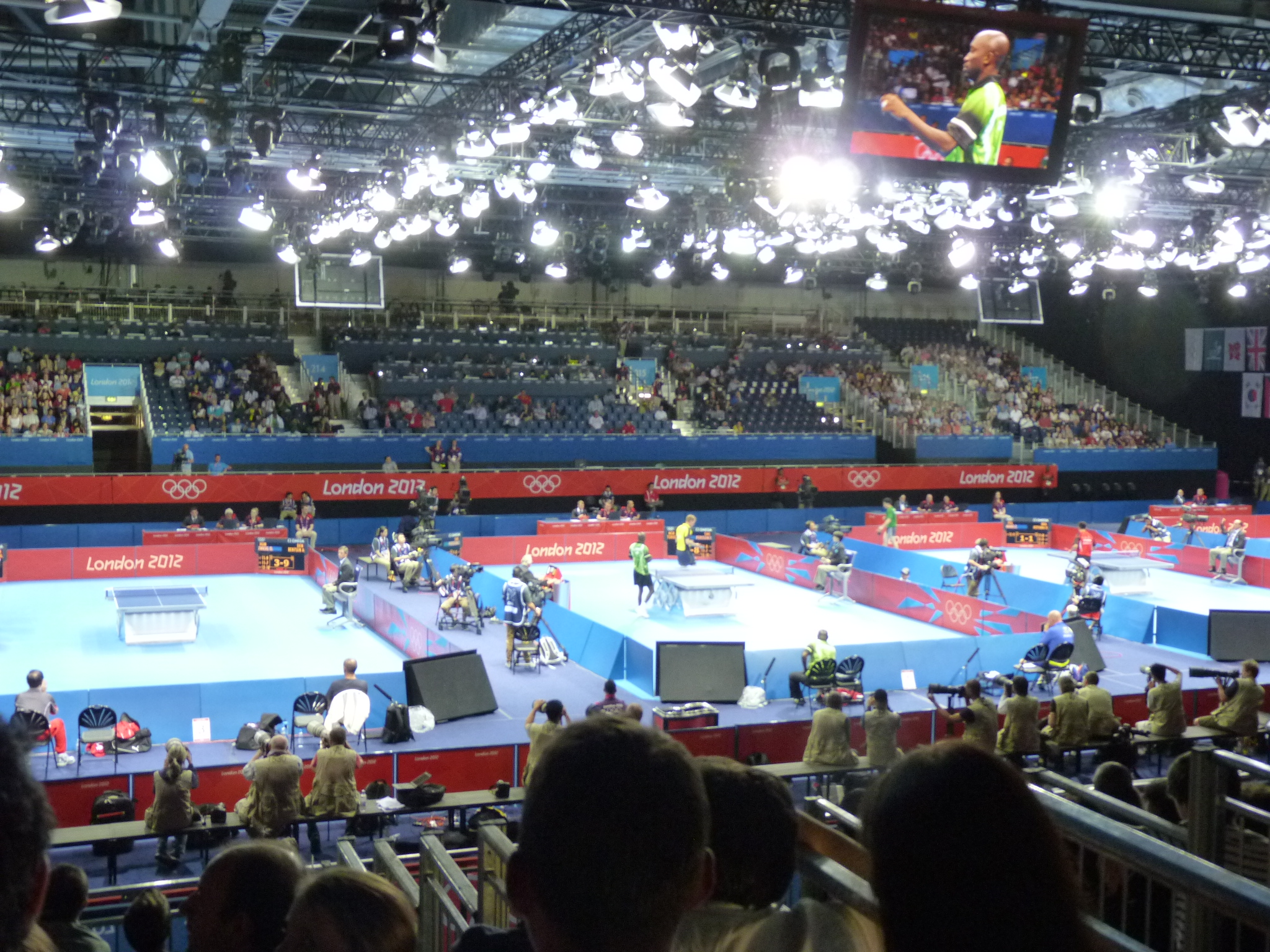
Excel London hosting table tennis events at the 2012 Summer Olympics

For the 2012 Summer Olympics, Excel London was divided into five sports halls with capacities ranging from 5,000 to 7,000 that were used for boxing, fencing, judo, taekwondo, table tennis, weightlifting, and wrestling.

=== Boxing ===
Excel hosted two boxing matches on 10 December 2005, the first between British heavyweights Danny Williams and Audley Harrison and the second between Amir Khan and Daniel Thorpe.

Excel also hosted the boxing match on 22 April 2008 between Amir Khan and Gairy St. Clair for the World Boxing Organization intercontinental lightweight title, and the boxing match on 29 November 2014 between Derek Chisora and Tyson Fury in a World Boxing Organization heavyweight championship eliminator.

=== Triathlon ===
The Virgin Active London Triathlon is held at Excel London on an annual basis, with the cycling and running legs taking place within and around the venue and the swim taking place in Royal Victoria Dock, adjacent to Excel.

=== Tennis ===
Excel hosted the inaugural Ultimate Tennis Showdown grand final in December 2023, a series of exhibition matches held during the professional tennis off-season.

=== Motorsport ===
Excel London Circuit
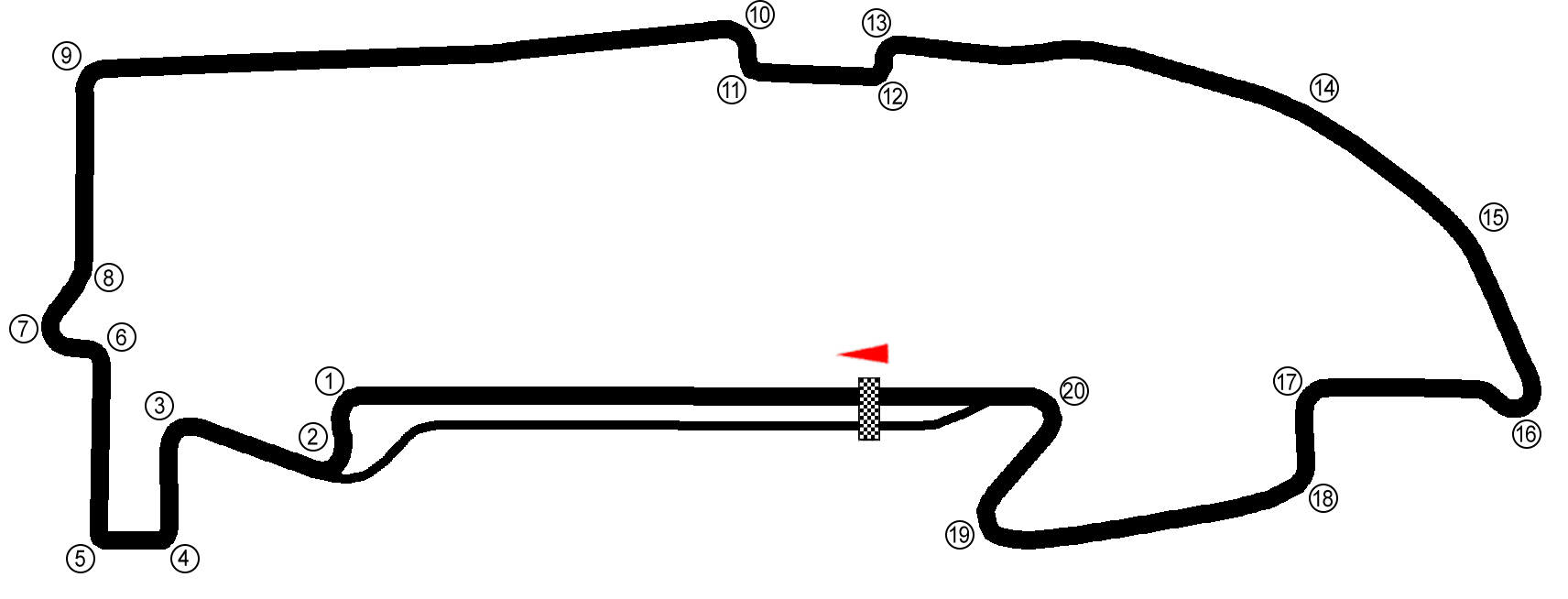
- Formula E Circuit (2023–2026) Formula E Circuit (2022) Original Formula E Circuit (2021)
- Location: Custom House, Docklands, London, E16; United Kingdom
- FIA Grade: FE
- Opened: 24 July 2021; 5 years ago
- Closed: 16 August 2026; 2 months ago
- Major events: Formula E London ePrix (2021–2026)
- Website: https://www.excel.london/

Formula E Circuit (2023–2026)
- Length: 2.086 km (1.296 mi)
- Turns: 20
- Race lap record: 1:07.950 ( (New Zealand) Nick Cassidy, Jaguar I-Type 7, 2025, F-E)

Formula E Circuit (2022)
- Length: 2.141 km (1.330 mi)
- Turns: 22
- Race lap record: 1:14.349 ( (New Zealand) Nick Cassidy, Audi e-tron FE07, 2022, F-E)

Original Formula E Circuit (2021)
- Length: 2.252 km (1.399 mi)
- Turns: 22
- Race lap record: 1:21.635 ( (Netherlands) Robin Frijns, Audi e-tron FE07, 2021, F-E)

The Formula E London ePrix was held with two back to back races at Excel, in July 2021 with part of the circuit running around the arena and part of the circuit in the exhibition hall itself. It was also due to be held in 2020, however the event was cancelled after the Excel was repurposed as a temporary NHS hospital named NHS Nightingale, to deal with the Coronavirus pandemic. After holding the penultimate round in 2022, it held the season finales from 2023 to 2026.

Winners:

Year	Driver	Team	Report
2021	(United Kingdom) Jake Dennis	(United States) BMW I Andretti Motorsport	Report
2021	(United Kingdom) Alex Lynn	(India) Mahindra Racing	Report
2022	(United Kingdom) Jake Dennis	(United States) Avalanche Andretti	Report
2022	(Brazil) Lucas Di Grassi	(Monaco) ROKiT Venturi	Report
2023	(New Zealand) Mitch Evans	(United Kingdom) Jaguar TCS Racing	Report
2023	(New Zealand) Nick Cassidy	(United Kingdom) Envision Racing	Report
2024	(Germany) Pascal Wehrlein	(Germany) TAGHeuer Porsche	Report
2024	(United Kingdom) Oliver Rowland	(Japan) Nissan Formula E Team	Report
2025	(New Zealand) Nick Cassidy	(United Kingdom) Jaguar TCS Racing	Report
2025	(New Zealand) Nick Cassidy	(United Kingdom) Jaguar TCS Racing	Report
2026	(Germany) Pascal Wehrlein	(Germany) Porsche Formula E Team	Report
2026	(United Kingdom) Taylor Barnard	(United States) DS Penske	Report

== COVID-19 pandemic ==
On 24 March 2020, the Excel was announced as a temporary NHS hospital, containing 5000 beds and named NHS Nightingale, to deal with the Coronavirus pandemic. This alternate care site was planned to shut down in early May 2020, but was also used as a mass vaccination centre as part of the COVID-19 vaccination programme from 11 January 2021.

== Other events ==
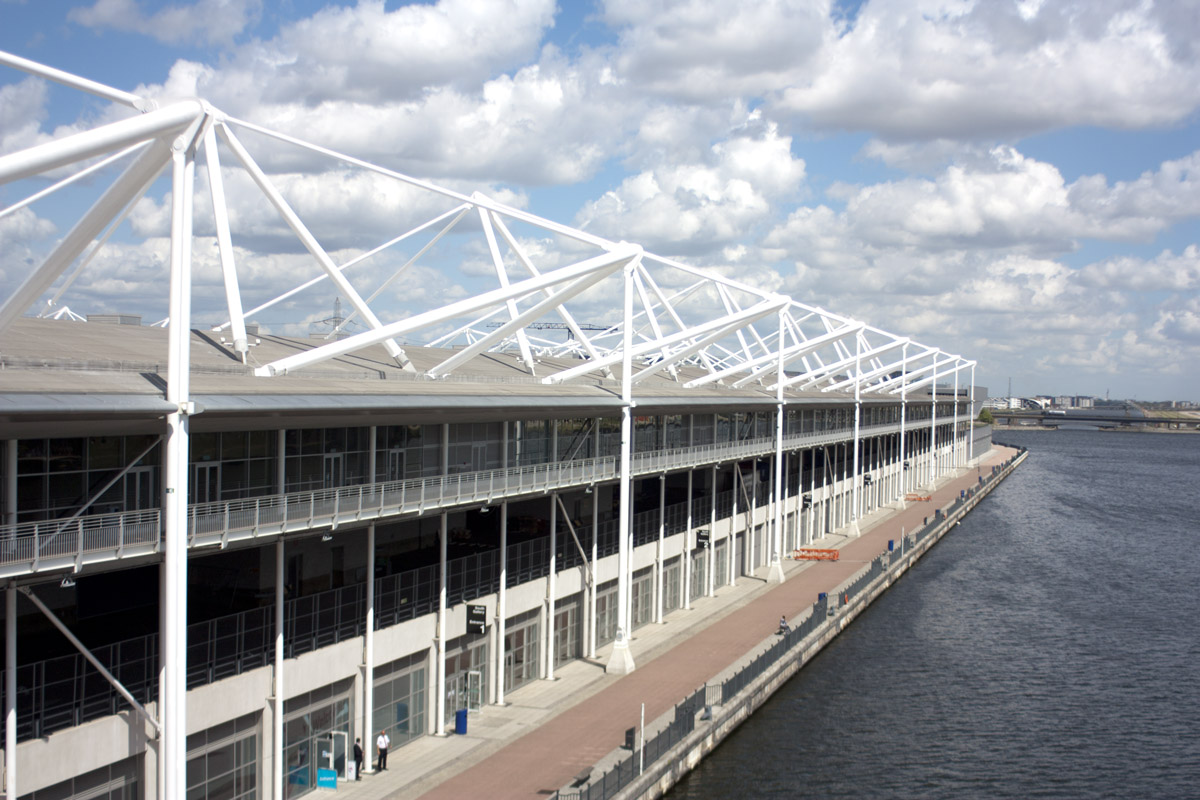
Excel waterfront south side

Excel London has hosted many different events, shows and award ceremonies, including the following events:

- Since 2001, the biannual UK arms fair DSEi.
- In 2003 filmmaker Dominic Leung filmed the music video of Coldplay's single Clocks at Excel with a laser show in front of a staged audience including university students.
- Each May and October, The MCM London Comic Con multi-genre convention is held at Excel.
- British International Motor Show 2006 and 2008
- Between 13 and 15 July 2007, it hosted Star Wars Celebration Europe; the first Star Wars fan event of its kind held outside the United States which attracted nearly 40,000 visitors over the three days.
- The annual G-20 Leaders' Summit on Financial Markets and the World Economy on 2 April 2009, commonly called The London Summit 2009, which was the largest gathering of world leaders London has seen since the first United Nations General Assembly in 1946.
- Between 29 and 31 May 2009, Clothes Show London returned to the capital.
- On Sunday 16 December 2012, Excel hosted the 2012 BBC Sports Personality of the Year Award.
- In April 2014, 49th annual meeting of the European Association for the Study of the Liver.
- The ICC Auditorium also hosted Miss World 2014 on 14 December 2014.
- Once again, the Excel hosted Star Wars Celebration Europe III from 15 to 17 July 2016.
- It hosted the 2016 BBC Music Awards on 12 December, broadcast live on BBC One.
- Excel hosted the inaugural RTX London between 14 and 15 October 2017, as well as the upcoming RTX London between 15 and 16 September 2018.
- Excel hosted the final weekend of the 14th series of The X Factor on 2–3 December 2017.
- Excel also hosted Miss World 2019 finals on 14 December.
- University College London has held its graduation ceremonies at Excel since 2022 (including the postponed 2020 and 2021 graduations).
- Excel hosted the RuPaul's DragCon UK event, from 6–8 January 2023.
- Star Wars Celebration Europe IV was held at Excel from 7–10 April 2023.

== Protests ==
In 2017 and 2019 there were demonstrations outside Excel to protest against the Defence and Security Equipment fair " DSEI". In 2017 a number of arrests were made for obstructing the highway.

Preceded by Bali Nusa Dua Convention Center (Indonesia) Bali; Sanya City Arena (China) Sanya	Miss World venues 2014; 2019	Succeeded by Crown of Beauty Theatre (China) Sanya; Coca-Cola Music Hall (Puerto Rico) San Juan
