= 2022 London ePrix =

Race 13 of 16 of the 2021–22 Formula E season
← Previous race	Next race →

Race details
- Date: 30 July 2022
- Official name: 2022 SABIC London E-Prix
- Location: ExCeL London Circuit, Royal Docks, Newham, London
- Course: Street circuit
- Course length: 2.141 km (1.330 mi)
- Distance: 37 laps, 79.217 km (49.223 mi)

Pole position
Driver	(United Kingdom) Jake Dennis	Andretti-BMW
- Time: 1:13:161

Fastest lap
Driver	(United Kingdom) Jake Dennis	Andretti-BMW
- Time: 1:14:429 on lap 19

Podium
First	(United Kingdom) Jake Dennis	Andretti-BMW
Second	(Belgium) Stoffel Vandoorne	Mercedes
Third	(New Zealand) Nick Cassidy	Envision-Audi

2022 London ePrix
Race 14 of 16 of the 2021–22 Formula E season
← Previous race	Next race →

Race details
- Date: 31 July 2022
- Official name: 2022 SABIC London E-Prix
- Location: ExCeL London Circuit, Royal Docks, Newham, London
- Course: Street circuit
- Course length: 2.141 km (1.330 mi)
- Distance: 38 laps, 81.358 km (50.554 mi)

Pole position
Driver	(United Kingdom) Jake Dennis	Andretti-BMW
- Time: 1:12:535

Fastest lap
Driver	(New Zealand) Nick Cassidy	Envision-Audi
- Time: 1:14:349 on lap 29

Podium
First	(Brazil) Lucas di Grassi	Venturi-Mercedes
Second	(United Kingdom) Jake Dennis	Andretti-BMW
Third	(Netherlands) Nyck de Vries	Mercedes

The 2022 London ePrix, known for sponsorship reasons as the 2022 SABIC London E-Prix, was a pair of Formula E electric car races held at the ExCeL London Circuit in the Royal Docks area of Newham, London on 30 and 31 July 2022. They served as the 13th and 14th rounds of the 2021–22 Formula E season and the 4th running of the London ePrix.

Home favourite pole-sitter Jake Dennis won the first race for Andretti, championship leader Stoffel Vandoorne finished second, with Nick Cassidy completing the podium. Lucas di Grassi won the second race, with Jake Dennis and Nyck de Vries in second and third.

== Background ==
Stoffel Vandoorne led the championship into the penultimate race weekend, with 155 points. Edoardo Mortara was second, 11 points behind and Mitch Evans 16 points behind in third.

Since the last event, the layout of the ExCeL London Circuit was changed, by removing hairpins at turn 10 and 11, reducing the circuit length to 2.141 km (1.330 mi).

== Classification ==
=== Race 1 ===
==== Qualifying ====
Group draw
Group A	(Belgium) VAN	(New Zealand) EVA	(Netherlands) FRI	(Brazil) DIG	(Germany) WEH	(New Zealand) CAS	(United Kingdom) BIR	(United Kingdom) SIM	(United Kingdom) TUR	(Germany) GUE	(Brazil) SET
Group B	(Switzerland) MOR	(France) JEV	(Portugal) DAC	(Netherlands) DEV	(Germany) LOT	(United Kingdom) DEN	(Switzerland) BUE	(United Kingdom) ROW	(United States) ASK	(United Kingdom) TIC	(Italy) GIO

==== Qualifying duels ====
Quarter-finals
B4	(Germany) André Lotterer
A1	(Belgium) Stoffel Vandoorne
B3	(United States) Oliver Askew
A2	(Brazil) Sérgio Sette Câmara
A3	(New Zealand) Nick Cassidy
B2	(Netherlands) Nyck de Vries
A4	(Germany) Maximilian Günther
B1	(United Kingdom) Jake Dennis

Semi-finals
(Belgium) Stoffel Vandoorne
(Brazil) Sérgio Sette Câmara
(Netherlands) Nyck de Vries
(United Kingdom) Jake Dennis

Final
(Belgium) Stoffel Vandoorne
(United Kingdom) Jake Dennis

===== Overall classification =====
Pos.	No.	Driver	Team	A	B	QF	SF	F	Grid
1	27	(United Kingdom) Jake Dennis	Andretti-BMW	—N/a	1:13:846	1:13:225	1:13:005	1:13:161	1
2	5	(Belgium) Stoffel Vandoorne	Mercedes	1:13:796	—N/a	1:13:528	1:13:131	1:13:298	2
3	17	(Netherlands) Nyck de Vries	Mercedes	—N/a	1:14:004	1:13:457	1:13:314	—N/a	3
4	7	(Brazil) Sérgio Sette Câmara	Dragon-Penske	—N/a	1:14:023	1:13:330	1:13:474	—N/a	4
5	28	(United States) Oliver Askew	Andretti-BMW	—N/a	1:14:270	1:13:688	—N/a	—N/a	5
6	22	(Germany) Maximilian Günther	e.dams-Nissan	1:14:252	—N/a	1:13:780	—N/a	—N/a	6
7	37	(New Zealand) Nick Cassidy	Envision-Audi	1:14:123	—N/a	1:13:852	—N/a	—N/a	7
8	36	(Germany) André Lotterer	Porsche	—N/a	1:14:297	1:13:917	—N/a	—N/a	8
9	48	(Switzerland) Edoardo Mortara	Venturi-Mercedes	—N/a	1:14:328	—N/a	—N/a	—N/a	9
10	4	(Netherlands) Robin Frijns	Envision-Audi	1:14:278	—N/a	—N/a	—N/a	—N/a	10
11	13	(Portugal) António Félix da Costa	Techeetah-DS	—N/a	1:14:336	—N/a	—N/a	—N/a	11
12	10	(United Kingdom) Sam Bird	Jaguar	1:14:431	—N/a	—N/a	—N/a	—N/a	12
13	25	(France) Jean-Éric Vergne	Techeetah-DS	—N/a	1:14:363	—N/a	—N/a	—N/a	13
14	9	(New Zealand) Mitch Evans	Jaguar	1:14:511	—N/a	—N/a	—N/a	—N/a	14
15	23	(Switzerland) Sébastien Buemi	e.dams-Nissan	—N/a	1:14:383	—N/a	—N/a	—N/a	15
16	29	(United Kingdom) Alexander Sims	Mahindra	1:14:591	—N/a	—N/a	—N/a	—N/a	16
17	30	(United Kingdom) Oliver Rowland	Mahindra	—N/a	1:14:448	—N/a	—N/a	—N/a	17
18	94	(Germany) Pascal Wehrlein	Porsche	1:14:602	—N/a	—N/a	—N/a	—N/a	18
19	99	(Italy) Antonio Giovinazzi	Dragon-Penske	—N/a	1:14:816	—N/a	—N/a	—N/a	19
20	3	(United Kingdom) Oliver Turvey	NIO	1:14:940	—N/a	—N/a	—N/a	—N/a	20
21	33	(United Kingdom) Dan Ticktum	NIO	—N/a	1:15:200	—N/a	—N/a	—N/a	21
22	11	(Brazil) Lucas di Grassi	Venturi-Mercedes	—N/a	—N/a	—N/a	—N/a	—N/a	22

==== Race ====
Pos.	No.	Driver	Team	Laps	Time/Retired	Grid	Points
1	27	(United Kingdom) Jake Dennis	Andretti-BMW	37	46:56:557	1	25+3^{1}+1^{2}
2	5	(Belgium) Stoffel Vandoorne	Mercedes	37	+2.223	2	18
3	37	(New Zealand) Nick Cassidy	Envision-Audi	37	+12.663	7	15
4	28	(United States) Oliver Askew	Andretti-BMW	37	+14.904	5	12
5	20	(New Zealand) Mitch Evans	Jaguar	37	+17.128	14	10
6	17	(Netherlands) Nyck de Vries	Mercedes	37	+17.367 (Note: De Vries was given a 5-second time penalty for moving under braking whilst defending Cassidy.)	3	8
7	13	(Portugal) António Félix da Costa	DS Techeetah	37	+17.733	11	6
8	22	(Germany) Maximilian Günther	e.dams-Nissan	37	+22.067	6	4
9	11	(Brazil) Lucas di Grassi	Venturi-Mercedes	37	+32.139	22	2
10	94	(Germany) Pascal Wehrlein	Porsche	37	+34.347	18	1
11	23	(Switzerland) Sébastien Buemi	e.dams-Nissan	37	+35.307	15	
12	36	(Germany) André Lotterer	Porsche	37	+35.508	8	
13	29	(United Kingdom) Alexander Sims	Mahindra	37	+40.345	16	
14	25	(France) Jean-Éric Vergne	DS Techeetah	37	+41.057	13	
15	3	(United Kingdom) Oliver Turvey	NIO	37	+41.293	20	
16	4	(Netherlands) Robin Frijns	Envision-Audi	37	+44.023	10	
17	33	(United Kingdom) Dan Ticktum	NIO	37	+51.947	21	
18	48	(Switzerland) Edoardo Mortara	Venturi-Mercedes	37	+1:18.796	9	
Ret	7	(Brazil) Sérgio Sette Câmara	Dragon-Penske	36	Low battery	4	
Ret	99	(Italy) Antonio Giovinazzi	Dragon-Penske	26	Accident	19	
Ret	30	(United Kingdom) Oliver Rowland	Mahindra	17	Collision damage	17	
Ret	10	(United Kingdom) Sam Bird	Jaguar	0	Collision damage	12	

Notes:

- ^1 – Pole position.
- ^2 – Fastest lap.

==== Standings after the race ====
Drivers' Championship standings

	Pos	Driver	Points
	1	(Belgium) Stoffel Vandoorne	173
1	3	(New Zealand) Mitch Evans	149
1	2	(Switzerland) Edoardo Mortara	144
	4	(France) Jean-Éric Vergne	128
1	5	(Portugal) António Félix da Costa	106

Teams' Championship standings

	Pos	Constructor	Points
	1	(Germany) Mercedes	264
1	3	(France) DS Techeetah	234
1	2	(Monaco) Venturi-Mercedes	230
	4	(United Kingdom) Jaguar	196
	5	(United Kingdom) Envision-Audi	166

- Notes: Only the top five positions are included for both sets of standings.

=== Race 2 ===
==== Qualifying ====
Group draw
Group A	(Belgium) VAN	(Switzerland) MOR	(Portugal) DAC	(Netherlands) DEV	(United Kingdom) DEN	(Germany) LOT	(United Kingdom) BIR	(United States) ASK	(United Kingdom) ROW	(Germany) GUE	(Brazil) SET
Group B	(New Zealand) EVA	(France) JEV	(Netherlands) FRI	(Brazil) DIG	(Germany) WEH	(New Zealand) CAS	(Switzerland) BUE	(United Kingdom) SIM	(United Kingdom) TUR	(United Kingdom) TIC	(Italy) GIO

==== Qualifying duels ====
Quarter-finals
B4	(Switzerland) Sébastien Buemi
A1	(United Kingdom) Jake Dennis
B3	(New Zealand) Nick Cassidy
A2	(Portugal) António Félix da Costa
A3	(Netherlands) Nyck de Vries
B2	(Italy) Antonio Giovinazzi
A4	(United States) Oliver Askew
B1	(Brazil) Lucas di Grassi

Semi-finals
(United Kingdom) Jake Dennis
(Portugal) António Félix da Costa
(Italy) Antonio Giovinazzi
(Brazil) Lucas di Grassi

Final
(United Kingdom) Jake Dennis
(Brazil) Lucas di Grassi

===== Overall classification =====
Pos.	No.	Driver	Team	A	B	QF	SF	F	Grid
1	27	(United Kingdom) Jake Dennis	Andretti-BMW	1:13:279	—N/a	1:12:661	1:12:649	1:12:535	1
2	11	(Brazil) Lucas di Grassi	Venturi-Mercedes	—N/a	1:13:006	1:12:686	1:12:641	1:13:619	2
3	99	(Italy) Antonio Giovinazzi	Dragon-Penske	—N/a	1:13:327	1:12:980	1:12:962	—N/a	3
4	13	(Portugal) António Félix da Costa	Techeetah-DS	1:13:360	—N/a	1:13:000	1:13:028	—N/a	4
5	17	(Netherlands) Nyck de Vries	Mercedes	1:13:370	—N/a	1:13:043	—N/a	—N/a	5
6	23	(Switzerland) Sébastien Buemi	e.dams-Nissan	—N/a	1:13:414	1:13:197	—N/a	—N/a	6
7	37	(New Zealand) Nick Cassidy	Envision-Audi	—N/a	1:13:411	1:13:490	—N/a	—N/a	7
8	28	(United States) Oliver Askew	Andretti-BMW	1:13:473	—N/a	1:44:374	—N/a	—N/a	11
9	22	(Germany) Maximilian Günther	e.dams-Nissan	1:13:497	—N/a	—N/a	—N/a	—N/a	8
10	25	(France) Jean-Éric Vergne	Techeetah-DS	—N/a	1:13:422	—N/a	—N/a	—N/a	9
11	30	(United Kingdom) Oliver Rowland	Mahindra	1:13:544	—N/a	—N/a	—N/a	—N/a	10
12	94	(Germany) Pascal Wehrlein	Porsche	—N/a	1:13:507	—N/a	—N/a	—N/a	12
13	5	(Belgium) Stoffel Vandoorne	Mercedes	1:13:624	—N/a	—N/a	—N/a	—N/a	13
14	9	(New Zealand) Mitch Evans	Jaguar	—N/a	1:13:511	—N/a	—N/a	—N/a	14
15	10	(United Kingdom) Sam Bird	Jaguar	1:13:652	—N/a	—N/a	—N/a	—N/a	15
16	33	(United Kingdom) Dan Ticktum	NIO	—N/a	1:13:696	—N/a	—N/a	—N/a	16
17	48	(Switzerland) Edoardo Mortara	Venturi-Mercedes	1:13:745	—N/a	—N/a	—N/a	—N/a	17
18	4	(Netherlands) Robin Frijns	Envision-Audi	—N/a	1:13:748	—N/a	—N/a	—N/a	18
19	7	(Brazil) Sérgio Sette Câmara	Dragon-Penske	1:13:745	—N/a	—N/a	—N/a	—N/a	19
20	3	(United Kingdom) Oliver Turvey	NIO	—N/a	1:13:948	—N/a	—N/a	—N/a	20
21	36	(Germany) André Lotterer	Porsche	1:14:076	—N/a	—N/a	—N/a	—N/a	21
22	29	(United Kingdom) Alexander Sims	Mahindra	—N/a	1:14:729	—N/a	—N/a	—N/a	22

==== Race ====
Pos.	No.	Driver	Team	Laps	Time/Retired	Grid	Points
1	11	(Brazil) Lucas di Grassi	Venturi-Mercedes	38	49:28:805	2	25
2	27	(United Kingdom) Jake Dennis	Andretti-BMW	38	+3.191	1	18+3^{1}+1^{2}
3	17	(Netherlands) Nyck de Vries	Mercedes	38	+4.508	5	15
4	5	(Belgium) Stoffel Vandoorne	Mercedes	38	+10.358	13	12
5	13	(Portugal) António Félix da Costa	DS Techeetah	38	+13.946	4	10
6	23	(Switzerland) Sébastien Buemi	e.dams-Nissan	38	+20.399	6	8
7	4	(Netherlands) Robin Frijns	Envision-Audi	38	+20.850	18	6
8	10	(United Kingdom) Sam Bird	Jaguar	38	+21.748	15	4
9	7	(Brazil) Sérgio Sette Câmara	Dragon-Penske	38	+28.913	19	2
10	94	(Germany) Pascal Wehrlein	Porsche	38	+29.685	12	1
11	29	(United Kingdom) Alexander Sims	Mahindra	38	+30.611	22	
12	36	(Germany) André Lotterer	Porsche	38	+31.644	21	
13	48	(Switzerland) Edoardo Mortara	Venturi-Mercedes	38	+35.147	17	
14	3	(United Kingdom) Oliver Turvey	NIO	38	+37.285	20	
15	22	(Germany) Maximilian Günther	e.dams-Nissan	38	+1:19.833	8	
Ret	37	(New Zealand) Nick Cassidy	Envision-Audi	35	Hydraulics	7	
Ret	20	(New Zealand) Mitch Evans	Jaguar	30	Powertrain	14	
Ret	28	(United States) Oliver Askew	Andretti-BMW	21	Collision	11	
Ret	99	(Italy) Antonio Giovinazzi	Dragon-Penske	19		3	
Ret	25	(France) Jean-Éric Vergne	DS Techeetah	3	Technical Issue	9	
Ret	30	(United Kingdom) Oliver Rowland	Mahindra	1	Collision damage	10	
Ret	33	(United Kingdom) Dan Ticktum	NIO	1	Collision	16	

Notes:

- ^1 – Pole position.
- ^2 – Fastest lap.

==== Standings after the race ====
Drivers' Championship standings

Pos	Driver	Points
1	(Belgium) Stoffel Vandoorne	185
3	(New Zealand) Mitch Evans	149
2	(Switzerland) Edoardo Mortara	144
4	(France) Jean-Éric Vergne	128
5	(Portugal) António Félix da Costa	116

Teams' Championship standings

	Pos	Constructor	Points
	1	(Germany) Mercedes	291
1	2	(Monaco) Venturi-Mercedes	255
1	3	(France) DS Techeetah	244
	4	(United Kingdom) Jaguar	200
	5	(United Kingdom) Envision-Audi	172

- Notes: Only the top five positions are included for both sets of standings.

== Notes ==
Previous race: 2022 New York City ePrix	FIA Formula E World Championship; 2021–22 season	Next race: 2022 Seoul ePrix
Previous race: 2021 London ePrix	London ePrix	Next race: 2023 London ePrix
