= 2023 London ePrix =

Race 15 of 16 of the 2022–23 Formula E season
← Previous race
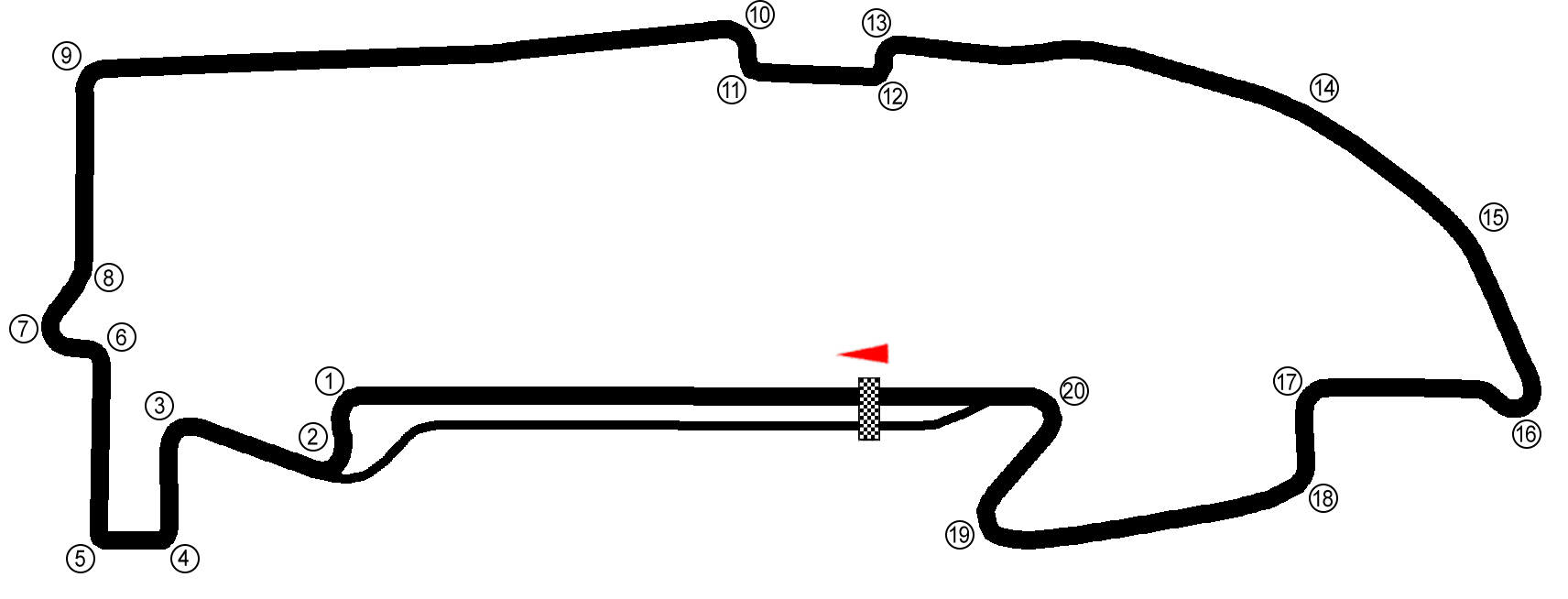

Race details
- Date: 29 July 2023
- Official name: 2023 Hankook London E-Prix
- Location: ExCeL London Circuit, Royal Docks, Newham, London
- Course: Street circuit
- Course length: 2.086 km (1.296 mi)
- Distance: 37 (Note: 36 planned laps and 1 extra lap) laps, 77.182 km (47.959 mi)
- Scheduled distance: 36 laps, 75.096 km (46.662 mi)

Pole position
Driver	(New Zealand) Mitch Evans	Jaguar
- Time: 1:10.578

Fastest lap
Driver	(Germany) Andre Lotterer	Andretti-Porsche
- Time: 1:12.342 on lap 35

Podium
First	(New Zealand) Mitch Evans	Jaguar
Second	(United Kingdom) Jake Dennis	Andretti-Porsche
Third	(Switzerland) Sebastien Buemi	Envision-Jaguar

2023 London ePrix
Race 16 of 16 of the 2022–23 Formula E season
← Previous race
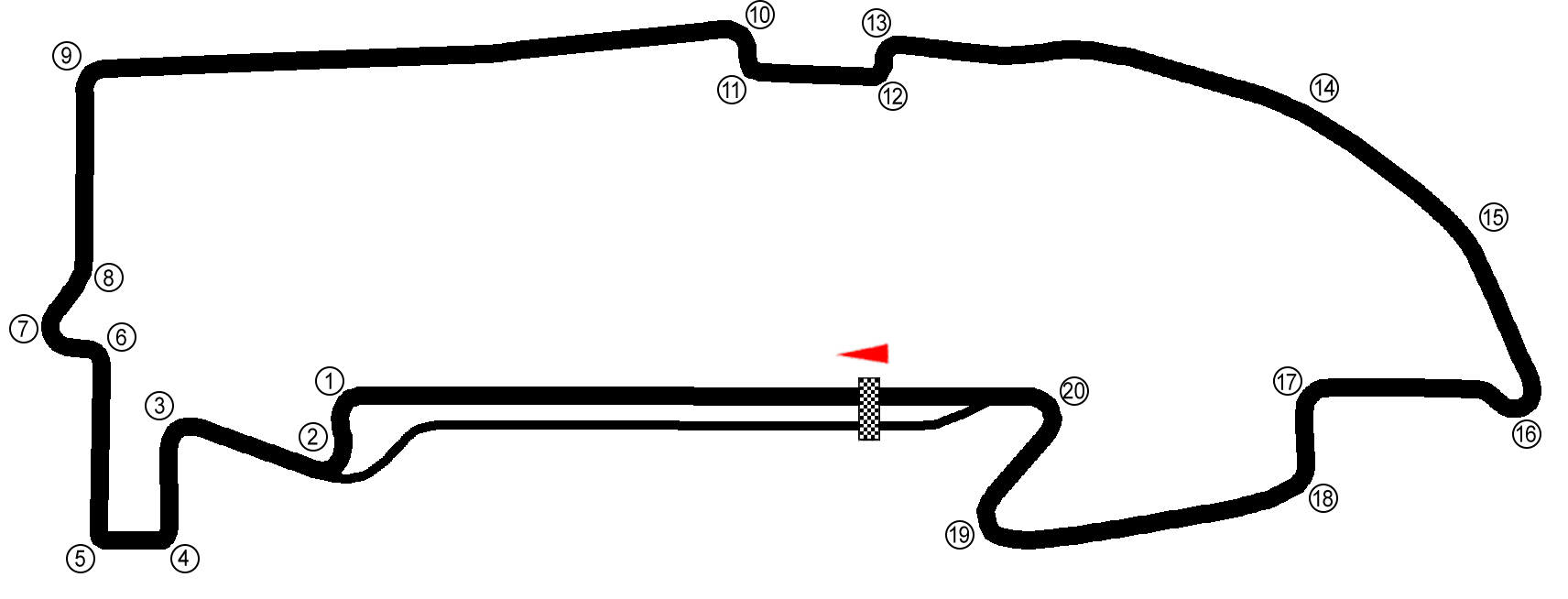

Race details
- Date: 30 July 2023
- Official name: 2023 Hankook London E-Prix
- Location: ExCeL London Circuit, Royal Docks, Newham, London
- Course: Street circuit
- Course length: 2.086 km (1.296 mi)
- Distance: 38 (Note: 34 planned laps and 4 extra laps) laps, 79.268 km (49.255 mi)
- Scheduled distance: 34 laps, 70.924 km (44.070 mi)

Pole position
Driver	(New Zealand) Nick Cassidy	Envision-Jaguar
- Time: 1:10.092

Fastest lap
Driver	(United Kingdom) Jake Dennis	Andretti-Porsche
- Time: 1:21.554 on lap 38

Podium
First	(New Zealand) Nick Cassidy	Envision-Jaguar
Second	(New Zealand) Mitch Evans	Jaguar
Third	(United Kingdom) Jake Dennis	Andretti-Porsche

The 2023 London ePrix, known for sponsorship reasons as the 2023 Hankook London E-Prix, was a pair of Formula E electric car races held at the ExCeL London Circuit in the Royal Docks area of Newham, London on 29 and 30 July 2023. They served as the 15th and 16th rounds of the 2022–23 Formula E season and the 5th running of the London ePrix.

Pole-sitter Mitch Evans won the first race for Jaguar Racing, however Jake Dennis clinched the title finishing second, with Sébastien Buemi completing the podium. After two red flags due to heavy rain, Nick Cassidy won the second race from pole, with Mitch Evans and Jake Dennis in second and third.

== Background ==
Jake Dennis led the championship into the final round, with 195 points. Nick Cassidy was second, 24 points behind and Mitch Evans 44 points behind in third. Pascal Wehrlein also entered the final rounds in championship contention with 146 points, 49 behind Dennis.

Since the last event, the layout of the ExCeL London Circuit was changed. The old turns 17 and 18 became a straight, reducing the circuit length to 2.086 km (1.296 mi).

The maximum usable energy during the race will decrease from 38kWh to 27kWh, in order to create more strategic racing.

== Classification ==
(All times in BST)

=== Race 1 ===
==== Qualifying ====
Qualifying for race 1 took place at 12:40 PM on 29 July.

Group draw
Group A	(United Kingdom) DEN	(New Zealand) EVA	(France) JEV	(Portugal) DAC	(United Kingdom) BIR	(Belgium) VAN	(Germany) RAS	(Switzerland) MOR	(Germany) LOT	(Brazil) SET	(Netherlands) FRI
Group B	(New Zealand) CAS	(Germany) WEH	(Germany) GUE	(Switzerland) BUE	(France) NAT	(United Kingdom) HUG	(France) FEN	(Brazil) DIG	(United Kingdom) TIC	(Switzerland) MUE	(Spain) MER

Qualifying duels

Quarter-finals
A3	(Belgium) Stoffel Vandoorne
A2	(New Zealand) Mitch Evans
A4	(Germany) René Rast
A1	(United Kingdom) Jake Dennis
B3	(United Kingdom) Dan Ticktum
B2	(Switzerland) Sébastien Buemi
B4	(Germany) Pascal Wehrlein
B1	(New Zealand) Nick Cassidy

Semi-finals
(New Zealand) Mitch Evans
(United Kingdom) Jake Dennis
(Switzerland) Sébastien Buemi
(New Zealand) Nick Cassidy

Final
(New Zealand) Mitch Evans
(New Zealand) Nick Cassidy

===== Overall classification =====
Pos.	No.	Driver	Team	A	B	QF	SF	F	Grid
1	9	(New Zealand) Mitch Evans	Jaguar	1:10.903	—N/a	1:10.463	1:10.430	1:10.578	6 (Note: Evans received a 5-place grid penalty for colliding with Nick Cassidy at the 2023 Rome ePrix.)
2	37	(New Zealand) Nick Cassidy	Envision-Jaguar	—N/a	1:10.721	1:10.613	1:10.662	1:10.604	1
3	27	(United Kingdom) Jake Dennis	Andretti-Porsche	1:10.873	—N/a	1:10.497	1:10.806	—N/a	2
4	16	(Switzerland) Sébastien Buemi	Envision-Jaguar	—N/a	1:10.883	1:10.404	1:16.765	—N/a	3
5	33	(United Kingdom) Dan Ticktum	NIO	—N/a	1:11.093	1:10.627	—N/a	—N/a	4
6	58	(Germany) René Rast	McLaren-Nissan	1:10.984	—N/a	1:10.893	—N/a	—N/a	5
7	94	(Germany) Pascal Wehrlein	Porsche	—N/a	1:11.148	1:11.057	—N/a	—N/a	7
8	1	(Belgium) Stoffel Vandoorne	DS	1:10.965	—N/a	1:11.071	—N/a	—N/a	8
9	10	(United Kingdom) Sam Bird	Jaguar	1:11.078	—N/a	—N/a	—N/a	—N/a	9
10	17	(France) Norman Nato	Nissan	—N/a	1:11.262	—N/a	—N/a	—N/a	10
11	48	(Switzerland) Edoardo Mortara	Maserati	1:11.161	—N/a	—N/a	—N/a	—N/a	11
12	51	(Switzerland) Nico Müller	ABT-Mahindra	—N/a	1:11.299	—N/a	—N/a	—N/a	12
13	25	(France) Jean-Éric Vergne	DS	1:11.275	—N/a	—N/a	—N/a	—N/a	13
14	7	(Germany) Maximilian Günther	Maserati	—N/a	1:11.305	—N/a	—N/a	—N/a	14
15	36	(Germany) André Lotterer	Andretti-Porsche	1:11.333	—N/a	—N/a	—N/a	—N/a	15
16	23	(France) Sacha Fenestraz	Nissan	—N/a	1:11.343	—N/a	—N/a	—N/a	16
17	13	(Portugal) António Félix da Costa	Porsche	1:11.403	—N/a	—N/a	—N/a	—N/a	17
18	5	(United Kingdom) Jake Hughes	McLaren-Nissan	—N/a	1:11.405	—N/a	—N/a	—N/a	18
19	3	(Brazil) Sérgio Sette Câmara	NIO	1:11.414	—N/a	—N/a	—N/a	—N/a	19
20	11	(Brazil) Lucas di Grassi	Mahindra	—N/a	1:11.823	—N/a	—N/a	—N/a	20
21	4	(Netherlands) Robin Frijns	ABT-Mahindra	1:11.613	—N/a	—N/a	—N/a	—N/a	21
22	8	(Spain) Roberto Merhi	Mahindra	—N/a	1:12.205	—N/a	—N/a	—N/a	22

==== Race ====
Race 1 took place at 5:03 PM on 29 July.

Pos.	No.	Driver	Team	Laps	Time/Retired	Grid	Points
1	9	(New Zealand) Mitch Evans	Jaguar	37	1:33:47.300	6	25+3^{1}
2	27	(United Kingdom) Jake Dennis	Andretti-Porsche	37	+1.116	2	18
3	16	(Switzerland) Sébastien Buemi	Envision-Jaguar	37	+1.668	3	15
4	10	(United Kingdom) Sam Bird	Jaguar	37	+3.054	9	12
5	48	(Switzerland) Edoardo Mortara	Maserati	37	+4.263	11	10
6	11	(Brazil) Lucas di Grassi	Mahindra	37	+4.769	20	8
7	33	(United Kingdom) Dan Ticktum	NIO	37	+5.118	4	6
8	17	(France) Norman Nato	Nissan	37	+7.257 (Note: Nato received a 5-second penalty for causing a collision with Buemi.)	10	4
9	94	(Germany) Pascal Wehrlein	Porsche	37	+8.725	7	2
10	5	(United Kingdom) Jake Hughes	McLaren-Nissan	37	+9.128	18	1+1^{2}
11	1	(Belgium) Stoffel Vandoorne	DS	37	+10.231	8	
12	7	(Germany) Maximilian Günther	Maserati	37	+10.568 (Note: Günther received a 5-second for causing a collision with da Costa.)	12	
13	36	(Germany) André Lotterer	Andretti-Porsche	37	+11.094 (Note: Lotterer received a 5-second penalty for causing a collision with Ticktum.)	15	
14	58	(Germany) René Rast	McLaren-Nissan	37	+11.789 (Note: Rast received a 5-second penalty for causing a collision with Wehrlein.)	5	
15	8	(Spain) Roberto Merhi	Mahindra	37	+23.472 (Note: Merhi received a 10-second penalty for causing a collision with Hughes.)	22	
16	13	(Portugal) António Félix da Costa	Porsche	37	+3:00.666 (Note: da Costa received a 3-minute time penalty for a technical infringement.)	17	
Ret	23	(France) Sacha Fenestraz	Nissan	27	Collision	16	
Ret	37	(New Zealand) Nick Cassidy	Envision-Jaguar	22	Collision damage	1	
Ret	51	(Switzerland) Nico Müller	ABT-Mahindra	19	Collision damage	12	
Ret	25	(France) Jean-Éric Vergne	DS	9	Retired in pits	13	
Ret	4	(Netherlands) Robin Frijns	ABT-Mahindra	6	Collision damage	21	
DSQ	3	(Brazil) Sérgio Sette Câmara	NIO	37	Disqualified (Note: Sette Câmara was disqualified for not following the instructions of an official.)	19	

Notes:

- ^1 – Pole position.
- ^2 – Fastest lap.

==== Standings after the race ====
Drivers' Championship standings

	Pos	Driver	Points
	1	(United Kingdom) Jake Dennis	213
1	2	(New Zealand) Mitch Evans	179
1	3	(New Zealand) Nick Cassidy	171
	4	(Germany) Pascal Wehrlein	148
	5	(France) Jean-Éric Vergne	107

Teams' Championship standings

	Pos	Constructor	Points
2	1	(United Kingdom) Jaguar	268
1	2	(United Kingdom) Envision-Jaguar	268
1	3	(Germany) Porsche	241
	4	(United States) Andretti-Porsche	236
	5	(France) DS	153

=== Race 2 ===
==== Qualifying ====
Qualifying for race 2 took place at 12:40 PM on 30 July.

Group draw
Group A	(United Kingdom) DEN	(New Zealand) CAS	(France) JEV	(Switzerland) BUE	(United Kingdom) BIR	(United Kingdom) HUG	(Germany) RAS	(Brazil) DIG	(United Kingdom) TIC	(Brazil) SET	(Netherlands) FRI
Group B	(New Zealand) EVA	(Germany) WEH	(Germany) GUE	(Portugal) DAC	(France) NAT	(Belgium) VAN	(Switzerland) MOR	(France) FEN	(Germany) LOT	(Switzerland) MUE	(Spain) MER

Qualifying duels

Quarter-finals
A3	(Switzerland) Sébastien Buemi
A2	(United Kingdom) Jake Dennis
A4	(United Kingdom) Sam Bird
A1	(New Zealand) Nick Cassidy
B3	(France) Norman Nato
B2	(Switzerland) Nico Müller
B4	(Belgium) Stoffel Vandoorne
B1	(New Zealand) Mitch Evans

Semi-finals
(United Kingdom) Jake Dennis
(New Zealand) Nick Cassidy
(France) Norman Nato
(New Zealand) Mitch Evans

Final
(New Zealand) Nick Cassidy
(New Zealand) Mitch Evans

===== Overall classification =====
Pos.	No.	Driver	Team	A	B	QF	SF	F	Grid
1	37	(New Zealand) Nick Cassidy	Envision-Jaguar	1:10:521	—N/a	1:10.586	1:10.536	1:10.092	1
2	9	(New Zealand) Mitch Evans	Jaguar	—N/a	1:10:598	1:10:137	1:10:008	1:10.102	2
3	17	(France) Norman Nato	Nissan	—N/a	1:10:954	1:10:493	1:10:514	—N/a	3
4	27	(United Kingdom) Jake Dennis	Andretti-Porsche	1:10:638	—N/a	1:10:586	1:10:717	—N/a	4
5	1	(Belgium) Stoffel Vandoorne	DS	—N/a	1:11:003	1:10:376	—N/a	—N/a	5
6	10	(United Kingdom) Sam Bird	Jaguar	1:10:689	—N/a	1:10:519	—N/a	—N/a	6
7	16	(Switzerland) Sébastien Buemi	Envision-Jaguar	1:10:647	—N/a	1:10:604	—N/a	—N/a	7
8	51	(Switzerland) Nico Müller	ABT-Mahindra	—N/a	1:10:871	1:10:758	—N/a	—N/a	8
9	33	(United Kingdom) Dan Ticktum	NIO	1:10.815	—N/a	—N/a	—N/a	—N/a	9
10	94	(Germany) Pascal Wehrlein	Porsche	—N/a	1:11.052	—N/a	—N/a	—N/a	10
11	25	(France) Jean-Éric Vergne	DS	1:10.819	—N/a	—N/a	—N/a	—N/a	11
12	48	(Switzerland) Edoardo Mortara	Maserati	—N/a	1:11.078	—N/a	—N/a	—N/a	12
13	58	(Germany) René Rast	McLaren-Nissan	1:10.982	—N/a	—N/a	—N/a	—N/a	13
14	36	(Germany) André Lotterer	Andretti-Porsche	—N/a	1:11.093	—N/a	—N/a	—N/a	14
15	3	(Brazil) Sérgio Sette Câmara	NIO	1:10.994	—N/a	—N/a	—N/a	—N/a	15
16	7	(Germany) Maximilian Günther	Maserati	—N/a	1:11.346	—N/a	—N/a	—N/a	16
17	11	(Brazil) Lucas di Grassi	Mahindra	1:11.104	—N/a	—N/a	—N/a	—N/a	17
18	23	(France) Sacha Fenestraz	Nissan	—N/a	1:11.347	—N/a	—N/a	—N/a	18
19	5	(United Kingdom) Jake Hughes	McLaren-Nissan	1:11.105	—N/a	—N/a	—N/a	—N/a	19
20	13	(Portugal) António Félix da Costa	Porsche	—N/a	1:11.371	—N/a	—N/a	—N/a	20
21	4	(Netherlands) Robin Frijns	ABT-Mahindra	1:11:348	—N/a	—N/a	—N/a	—N/a	22 (Note: Frijns received a 3-place grid penalty for causing a collision with di Grassi in race 1.)
22	8	(Spain) Roberto Merhi	Mahindra	—N/a	1:11:791	—N/a	—N/a	—N/a	21

==== Race ====
Race 2 took place at 5:03 PM on 30 July.

Pos.	No.	Driver	Team	Laps	Time/Retired	Grid	Points
1	37	(New Zealand) Nick Cassidy	Envision-Jaguar	38	2:13:56.532	1	25+3^{1}
2	9	(New Zealand) Mitch Evans	Jaguar	38	+4.934	2	18
3	27	(United Kingdom) Jake Dennis	Andretti-Porsche	38	+16.295	4	15+1^{2}
4	17	(France) Norman Nato	Nissan	38	+24.819	3	12
5	1	(Belgium) Stoffel Vandoorne	DS	38	+26.290	5	10
6	16	(Switzerland) Sébastien Buemi	Envision-Jaguar	38	+27.406	7	8
7	10	(United Kingdom) Sam Bird	Jaguar	38	+29.376	6	6
8	51	(Switzerland) Nico Müller	ABT-Mahindra	38	+30.304	8	4
9	33	(United Kingdom) Dan Ticktum	NIO	38	+30.832	9	2
10	94	(Germany) Pascal Wehrlein	Porsche	38	+35.558	10	1
11	48	(Switzerland) Edoardo Mortara	Maserati	38	+36.615	12	
12	58	(Germany) René Rast	McLaren-Nissan	38	+38.160	13	
13	3	(Brazil) Sérgio Sette Câmara	NIO	38	+40.295	15	
14	7	(Germany) Maximilian Günther	Maserati	38	+51.140	16	
15	23	(France) Sacha Fenestraz	Nissan	38	+51.918	18	
16	13	(Portugal) António Félix da Costa	Porsche	38	+53.336	20	
17	4	(Netherlands) Robin Frijns	ABT-Mahindra	38	+56.608	22	
18	11	(Brazil) Lucas di Grassi	Mahindra	38	+58.064	17	
19	5	(United Kingdom) Jake Hughes	McLaren-Nissan	38	+59.956	19	
20	8	(Spain) Roberto Merhi	Mahindra	38	+1:02.506	21	
21	36	(Germany) André Lotterer	Andretti-Porsche	38	+1:02.890	14	
22	25	(France) Jean-Éric Vergne	DS	37	+1 lap	11	

Notes:

- ^1 – Pole position.
- ^2 – Fastest lap.

==== Standings after the race ====
Drivers' Championship standings

	Pos	Driver	Points
	1	(United Kingdom) Jake Dennis	229
1	2	(New Zealand) Nick Cassidy	199
1	3	(New Zealand) Mitch Evans	197
	4	(Germany) Pascal Wehrlein	149
	5	(France) Jean-Éric Vergne	107

Teams' Championship standings

	Pos	Constructor	Points
1	1	(United Kingdom) Envision-Jaguar	304
1	2	(United Kingdom) Jaguar	292
1	3	(United States) Andretti-Porsche	252
1	4	(Germany) Porsche	242
	5	(France) DS	163

- Notes: Only the top five positions are included for both sets of standings.

== Notes ==
Previous race: 2023 Rome ePrix	FIA Formula E World Championship; 2022–23 season	Next race: 2024 Mexico City ePrix
Previous race: 2022 London ePrix	London ePrix	Next race: 2024 London ePrix
