= Battersea Park Street Circuit =

Motor racing circuit located in London, England

Battersea Park Circuit
- Location: London, England
- Coordinates: 51°28′45″N 0°09′26″W
- Opened: 26 June 2015; 11 years ago
- Closed: 3 July 2016; 10 years ago
- Architect: Simon Gibbons
- Major events: Formula E London ePrix (2015–2016)

Street Circuit (2015–2016)
- Length: 2.925 km (1.818 mi)
- Turns: 17
- Race lap record: 1:24.150 ( (Switzerland) Sébastien Buemi, Renault Z.E 15, 2016, Formula E)

Battersea Park Street Circuit was a motor racing circuit located in Battersea Park, London, England from 2015 to 2016. It hosted the final two races of the 2014–15 Formula E season, and also the second season. The track was 2.925 km (1.818 mi) in length and featured 17 turns.

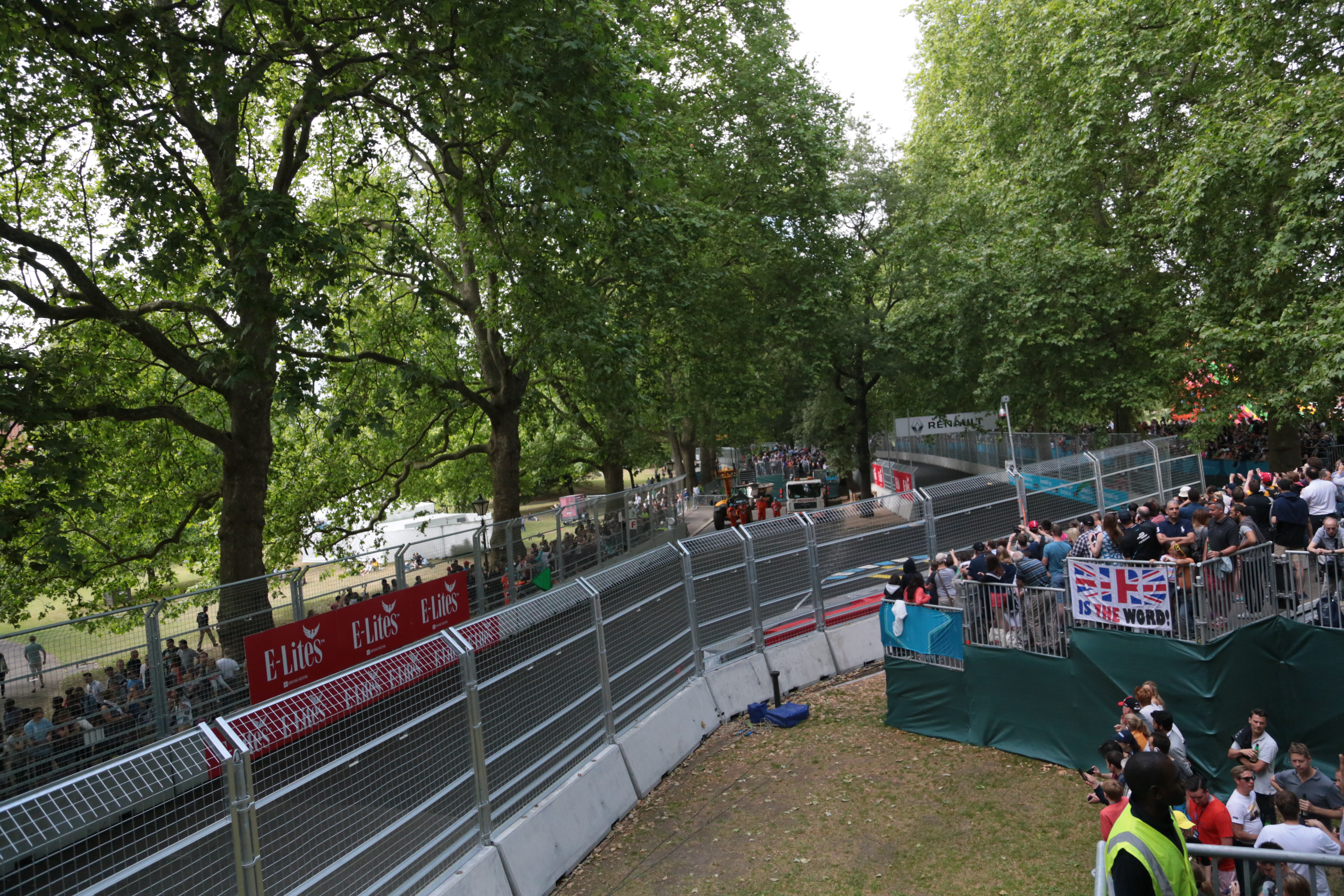
The circuit ran through Battersea Park

There was controversy over circuit's installation in a Grade II* listed park, and it was announced in 2016 that the Formula E race would not be held there again.

== History ==
The track was designed by Formula E's London event team and British architect Simon Gibbons. Wandsworth Council approved of the circuit and the double race on 19 February 2015.

The circuit was criticized for being too narrow and too bumpy, with Jérôme d'Ambrosio suffering broken suspension. A last-minute change to turn 1 had to be implemented and the race had to be started under a pace car.

There was controversy over the park circuit taking place in a Grade II* listed park, with opposition to the disruption the races and subsequent build period would cause to a free public space. Around the race weekends a majority of the park was closed to the public for four days with a three-week disruption period. The local community set up a group to oppose any further races in the park.

On June 26, 2015, Boris Johnson, who was Mayor of London at the time, drove the Spark-Renault SRT_01E around the circuit in an effort to promote the E-prix.

In June 2016 Formula E announced that, on the basis of understanding between Formula E and the Battersea Park Action Group, Formula E would not return.
