= Envision Racing =

British Formula E team

(United Kingdom) Paysafe Envision Racing
- Founded: 2013
- Former names: Envision Racing (2022–2026); Envision Virgin Racing (2018–2021); DS Virgin Racing (2015–2018); Virgin Racing (2014–2015)
- Base: Silverstone Park, United Kingdom
- Team principal(s): Sylvain Filippi
- Current series: Formula E
- Current drivers: 7. (Germany) Maximilian Günther; 15. (United Kingdom) Zak O'Sullivan; (Switzerland) Sébastien Buemi (Note: Advisory role and development driver) (United Kingdom) Alice Powell (Note: Simulator and development driver.)
- Noted drivers: (New Zealand) Nick Cassidy (United Kingdom) Sam Bird (Netherlands) Robin Frijns (Spain) Jaime Alguersuari (Switzerland) Fabio Leimer (France) Jean-Éric Vergne (Argentina) José María López (United Kingdom) Alex Lynn (Sweden) Joel Eriksson
- Races: 148
- Wins: 17
- Podiums: 56
- Poles: 15
- Points: 1830
- Teams' Championships: 2022–23
- First entry: 2014 Beijing ePrix
- Last entry: 2025 London ePrix
- First win: 2014 Putrajaya ePrix
- Last win: 2025 Monaco ePrix
- Website: https://envision-racing.com/

Paysafe Envision Racing is a British motor racing team that competes in Formula E. Founded as Virgin Racing in 2014, the team is based at Silverstone Park and is majority-owned by Chinese wind turbine manufacturer Envision Energy since 2022. It won the teams' championship in 2022–23.

Currently, its two drivers are Maximilian Günther and Zak O'Sullivan.

== History ==
Virgin was one of the first teams to enter Formula E; its entry was officially confirmed in December 2013. Virgin partnered with Peugeot but rebadged as DS Automobiles from the 2015–16 season to the 2017–18 season, competing as DS Virgin Racing during that time. With DS moving its support to rival team Techeetah from the 2018–19 season onwards, Virgin chose to establish a long-term customer car deal with Audi Sport.

=== 2014–15 season ===
The team signed drivers Jaime Alguersuari and Sam Bird for its inaugural season. Bird scored three podiums (two of which were wins), which was enough for a fifth place in the Drivers' Championship. For the final round in London, which was a double-header event, the team replaced Alguersuari with Fabio Leimer. Virgin would finish fifth in Teams' Championship with 133 points.

=== 2015–16 season ===
For its second season, Virgin confirmed Sam Bird and Jean-Éric Vergne, who moved to the team from Andretti Autosport. It was the first season in partnership with Peugeot but rebadged as DS Performance. The season was fairly successful, as the team recorded four pole positions (three with Bird, one with Vergne). The team finished third in Teams' Championship with 144 points.

=== 2016–17 season ===
For the 2016–17 season, Virgin signed José María López to partner Bird who stayed in the team. López was forced to miss the New York City ePrix due to his commitments in the FIA WEC series. For this event, he was temporarily replaced by Alex Lynn. Lynn retired from both races, but scored a pole position on his debut. Bird, on the other hand, won both of these races. Lynn was later signed to the team for the next season as a full-time driver. López returned to finish the season at the Montreal ePrix and finished his last race with the team on a podium as he finished third.

Virgin improved their points score to 190 points, but it was only enough for a fourth place in Teams' Championship.

=== 2017–18 season ===
Virgin fielded Bird and the returning Alex Lynn for its fourth season. Bird was in contention for the Drivers' Championship as the main rival for Jean-Éric Vergne (who competed for Techeetah at the time), however, he got overtaken by Lucas di Grassi in the final weekend of the season in New York City, thus finished third. Lynn was unable to keep up with Bird for the entire campaign and was not kept for the next season.

Virgin would finish third in Teams' Championship with 160 points. This season would mark the end of the partnership with DS.

=== 2018–19 season ===
For the 2018–19 season, as Peugeot-DS ended their partnership with the team, Virgin opted to become a customer team by switching to Audi powertrains. This move allowed the team to sign Robin Frijns, an Audi factory driver, as Bird's teammate. The team also signed a sponsorship deal with Chinese wind turbine manufacturer Envision Energy, leading to the team rebrand to Envision Virgin Racing.

The Audi e-tron FE05 powertrain proved to be very competitive, giving Virgin a chance at multiple strong results. The team would finish third in Teams' Championship with 191 points, just a point ahead of Nissan e.dams. Both Bird and Frijns would find themselves at the top of the Drivers' Championship at various points during the season, but only finished ninth and fourth respectively.

=== 2019–20 season ===
Bird and Frijns were retained for the 2019–20 season along with the Audi customer deal. Bird won the 2019 Diriyah ePrix and got a podium in Race 1 of the 2020 Berlin ePrix. Frijns had a poor start until the season stopped due to the COVID-19 pandemic. He then scored two podiums at Race 3 and 5 of the Berlin ePrix. Bird and Frijns finished 10th and 12th respectively that season and Envision Virgin finished 4th in the Teams’ Championship.

=== 2020–21 season ===
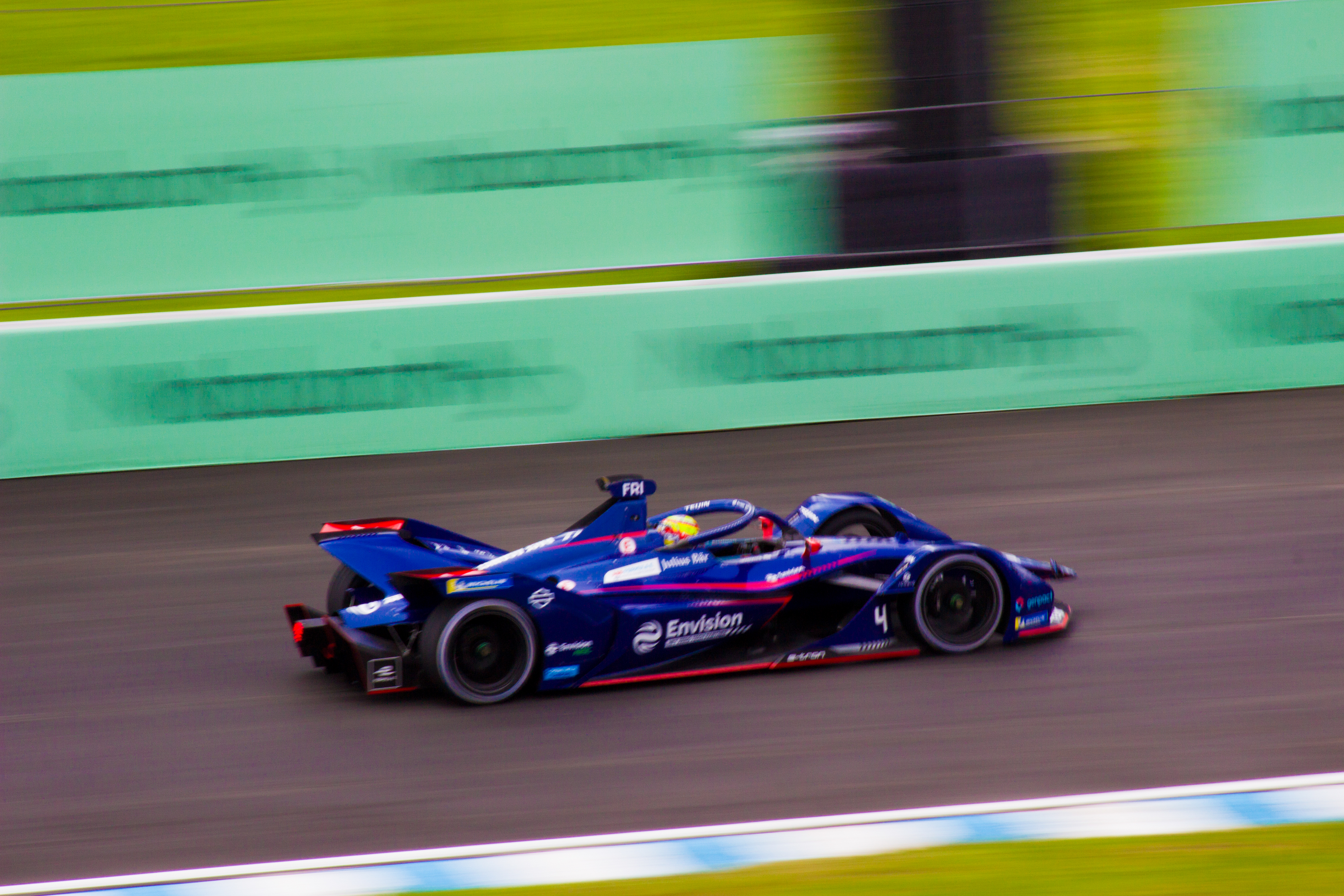
Robin Frijns with the customer Audi e-tron FE07 at the 2021 Puebla ePrix.

After six seasons with the outfit, Bird left Virgin to join Jaguar Racing. In July 2020, the team announced reigning Super Formula champion Nick Cassidy would partner Frijns for the 2020–21 season.

=== 2021–22 season ===
Following the 2020–21 season Virgin left the team as a partner and the team re-branded as Envision Racing, and introduced a new green livery for its entry. Cassidy and Frijns were retained as drivers, while Alice Powell became the Simulator and Development Driver for the team.

=== 2022–23 season ===
The team switched from Audi to Jaguar powertrains for the Gen3 era. Following the departure of Frijns, Formula E champion Sébastien Buemi joined the team to partner Cassidy. The team had a strong performance throughout the season, with Cassidy winning 4 ePrixs and was in contention for the driver's world championship. After a race victory in the season finale of London Race 2, the team has secured the Team's Championship, the first championship in the history of the team under different brands.

=== 2023–24 season ===
Frijns reunited with the team as Cassidy joined the Jaguar factory team.

=== 2024–25 season ===
Both Frijns and Buemi were retained in season 11. Buemi managed to secure a race victory at race 2 of the Monaco ePrix.

=== 2025–26 season ===
Frijns was released from the team and replaced by Joel Eriksson.

== Results ==
Year	Chassis	Powertrain	Tyres	No.	Drivers	1	2	3	4	5	6	7	8	9	10	11	12	13	14	15	16	Points	T.C.	
Virgin Racing
2014–15	Spark SRT01-e	SRT01-e^{1}	M			BEI	PUT	PDE	BUE	MIA	LBH	MCO	BER	MSC	LDN							133	5th	
2014–15	Spark SRT01-e	SRT01-e^{1}	M	2	(United Kingdom) Sam Bird	3	1	Ret	7	8	Ret	4	8	Ret	6	1						133	5th	
2014–15	Spark SRT01-e	SRT01-e^{1}	M	3	(Spain) Jaime Alguersuari	11	9	5	4	11	8	Ret	12	13								133	5th	
2014–15	Spark SRT01-e	SRT01-e^{1}	M	3	(Switzerland) Fabio Leimer										14	Ret						133	5th	
DS Virgin Racing
2015–16	Spark SRT01-e	Virgin Racing Engineering^{2} DSV-01	M			BEI	PUT	PDE	BUE	MEX	LBH	PAR	BER	LDN								144	3rd	
2015–16	Spark SRT01-e	Virgin Racing Engineering^{2} DSV-01	M	2	(United Kingdom) Sam Bird	7	2	Ret	1	6	6	6	11	7	Ret							144	3rd	
2015–16	Spark SRT01-e	Virgin Racing Engineering^{2} DSV-01	M	25	(France) Jean-Éric Vergne	12	Ret	7	11	16	13†	2	5	3	8							144	3rd	
2016–17	Spark SRT01-e	DS Virgin DSV-02	M			HKG	MRK	BUE	MEX	MCO	PAR	BER		NYC		MTL						190	4th	
2016–17	Spark SRT01-e	DS Virgin DSV-02	M	2	(United Kingdom) Sam Bird	13	2	Ret	3	Ret	16	7	7	1	1	5	4					190	4th	
2016–17	Spark SRT01-e	DS Virgin DSV-02	M	37	(Argentina) José María López	Ret	10	10	6	Ret	2	4	5			Ret	3					190	4th	
2016–17	Spark SRT01-e	DS Virgin DSV-02	M	37	(United Kingdom) Alex Lynn									Ret	Ret							190	4th	
2017–18	Spark SRT01-e	DS Virgin DSV-03	M			HKG		MRK	SCL	MEX	PDE	RME	PAR	BER	ZUR	NYC						160	3rd	
2017–18	Spark SRT01-e	DS Virgin DSV-03	M	2	(United Kingdom) Sam Bird	1	5	3	5	Ret	3	1	3	7	2	9	10					160	3rd	
2017–18	Spark SRT01-e	DS Virgin DSV-03	M	36	(United Kingdom) Alex Lynn	8	9	10	Ret	10	6	Ret	14	16	16	Ret	14					160	3rd	
Envision Virgin Racing
2018–19	Spark SRT05e	Audi e-tron FE05	M			ADR	MRK	SCL	MEX	HKG	SYX	RME	PAR	MCO	BER	BRN	NYC					191	3rd	
2018–19	Spark SRT05e	Audi e-tron FE05	M	2	(United Kingdom) Sam Bird	11	3	1	9	6	Ret	11	11	16†	9	4	8	4				191	3rd	
2018–19	Spark SRT05e	Audi e-tron FE05	M	4	(Netherlands) Robin Frijns	12	2	5	11	3	11	4	1	17†	13	Ret	Ret	1				191	3rd	
2019–20	Spark SRT05e	Audi e-tron FE06	M			DIR		SCL	MEX	MRK	BER		BER		BER							121	4th	
2019–20	Spark SRT05e	Audi e-tron FE06	M	2	(United Kingdom) Sam Bird	1^{G}	Ret	10	Ret	10	3	6	13	11	20	5						121	4th	
2019–20	Spark SRT05e	Audi e-tron FE06	M	4	(Netherlands) Robin Frijns	5	Ret	15	DSQ	12	Ret	4	2	DNS	2	Ret						121	4th	
2020–21	Spark SRT05e	Audi e-tron FE07	M			DIR		RME		VLC		MCO	PUE		NYC		LDN		BER	BER		165	5th	
2020–21	Spark SRT05e	Audi e-tron FE07	M	4	(Netherlands) Robin Frijns	17	2^{G}	4	18	6	19	2^{G}	16	11	5	8	13	4	15	12		165	5th	
2020–21	Spark SRT05e	Audi e-tron FE07	M	37	(New Zealand) Nick Cassidy	19	14	15	Ret	4	13	8	Ret	2	4	2	11	7	14	17		165	5th	
Envision Racing
2021–22	Spark SRT05e	Audi e-tron FE07	M			DRH		MEX	RME		MCO	BER		JAK	MRK	NYC		LDN		SEO		194	5th	
2021–22	Spark SRT05e	Audi e-tron FE07	M	4	(Netherlands) Robin Frijns	16	2	7	2	3	4	12	5	17	18	3	6	16	7	8	4	194	5th	
2021–22	Spark SRT05e	Audi e-tron FE07	M	37	(New Zealand) Nick Cassidy	7	16	13	9	Ret	7	Ret	21	16	13	1	15	3	Ret	10	8	194	5th	
2022–23	Formula E Gen3	Jaguar I-Type 6	H			MEX	DRH		HYD	CAP	SAP	BER		MCO	JAK		POR	RME		LDN		304	1st	
2022–23	Formula E Gen3	Jaguar I-Type 6	H	16	(Switzerland) Sébastien Buemi	6	4	6	15	5	10	4	20	8	20	10	5	Ret	5	3	6	304	1st	
2022–23	Formula E Gen3	Jaguar I-Type 6	H	37	(New Zealand) Nick Cassidy	9	6	13	2	3	2	5	1	1	7	18	1	2	14	Ret	1	304	1st	
2023–24	Formula E Gen3	Jaguar I-Type 6	H			MEX	DIR		SAP	TOK	MIS		MCO	BER		SHA		POR		LDN		121	6th	
2023–24	Formula E Gen3	Jaguar I-Type 6	H	4	(Netherlands) Robin Frijns	Ret	10	2	18	9	17	Ret	17			12	9	2	2	Ret	7	121	6th	
2023–24	Formula E Gen3	Jaguar I-Type 6	H	4	(Sweden) Joel Eriksson									Ret	9							121	6th	
2023–24	Formula E Gen3	Jaguar I-Type 6	H	16	(Switzerland) Sébastien Buemi	2	12	WD	10	13	12	Ret	15			8	12	20	9	3	4	121	6th	
2023–24	Formula E Gen3	Jaguar I-Type 6	H	16	(Estonia) Paul Aron									13	14							121	6th	
2024–25	Formula E Gen3 Evo	Jaguar I-Type 7	H			SAP	MEX	JED		MIA	MCO		TOK		SHA		JAK	BER		LDN		107	8th	
2024–25	Formula E Gen3 Evo	Jaguar I-Type 7	H	4	(Netherlands) Robin Frijns	Ret	11	13	14	8	8	11	9	16	10	8	9	13	Ret	7	13	107	8th	
2024–25	Formula E Gen3 Evo	Jaguar I-Type 7	H	16	(Switzerland) Sébastien Buemi	7	17	12	19	13	19	1	4	9	9	18	3	7	Ret	16	3	107	8th	
2025–26	Formula E Gen3 Evo	Jaguar I-Type 7	H			SAP	MEX	MIA	JED		MAD	BER		MCO		SAN	SHA		TKO		LDN		152	7th
2025–26	Formula E Gen3 Evo	Jaguar I-Type 7	H	14	(Sweden) Joel Eriksson	7	14	4	18	13	10	16	10	6	7	12	7	3	12	Ret	14	Ret	152	7th
2025–26	Formula E Gen3 Evo	Jaguar I-Type 7	H	16	(Switzerland) Sébastien Buemi	8	17	7	7	2	7	12	4	5	17	13	18	5	14	15	4	5	152	7th

Notes

- ^1 – In the inaugural season, all teams were supplied with a spec powertrain by McLaren.
- ^2 – Powertrain developed by DS Performance, branded as Virgin.
- ^{G} – Driver was fastest in group qualifying stage and was given one championship point.
- † – Driver did not finish the race, but was classified as he completed over 90% of the race distance.
- * – Season still in progress.
