= Parque O'Higgins Circuit =

Car racing circuit

- Modified Formula E Circuit (2020)

- Original Formula E Circuit (2019)
- Location: Santiago, Chile
- Coordinates: 33°27′45″S 70°39′35″W
- Opened: 26 January 2019; 7 years ago
- Closed: 18 January 2020; 6 years ago
- Major events: Formula E Santiago ePrix (2019–2020)

Modified Formula E Circuit (2020)
- Length: 2.287 km (1.421 mi)
- Turns: 11
- Race lap record: 1:06.405 ( (United Kingdom) Oliver Rowland, Nissan IM02, 2020, F-E)

Original Formula E Circuit (2019)
- Length: 2.348 km (1.459 mi)
- Turns: 14
- Race lap record: 1:11:263 ( (Germany) Daniel Abt, Audi e-tron FE05, 2019, F-E)

The Parque O'Higgins Circuit was an 11 turn, 2.287 km (1.421 mi) long temporary street circuit located in the city of Santiago, Chile, and was used for the Santiago ePrix of the electric, single-seater ABB Formula E Championship. Its first use came on 26 January 2019, when it hosted the 2019 Santiago ePrix, and replaced the previous Santiago Street Circuit as the venue of the race.

== History ==
Santiago had always been expected to host the third round of the 2018–19 championship, but the race remained without an assigned location while FE and city officials negotiated terms for the electric championship to return and hold a second event, following the success of the inaugural race. However, a new layout was made necessary, after logistical challenges were encountered at the inaugural race, which faced intense opposition from local residents due to its use of roads through Santiago's Forestal Park. As such, plans were made to relocate the race to the O'Higgins Park, in a bid to reduce the disruption to local residents during the race.

== Layout ==
The original layout of the circuit was a 14 turn, 2.348 km (1.459 mi) long track, and consisted of the roads inside of the O’Higgins Park, running around the Movistar Arena.

During the second running of the race at the Circuit, the 2020 Santiago ePrix, numerous changes to the track layout were made, most notably at the curving back straight, where the tight chicane was removed, while the pit lane was moved to the other side of the track, to the inside of the circuit. In addition, the sweeping right hander which was the former Turn 1 was modified, with a new left hander being added ahead of the former 1st turn. The final sector of the lap was also removed, with the zig-zag section of the track being reversed compared to the previous year. The removal of the chicane came as Formula E looked to reduce the number of chicanes on the tracks in the championship.
