= Santiago ePrix =

- Parque O'Higgins Circuit (2020)

Race information
- Number of times held: 3
- First held: 2018
- Last held: 2020
- Circuit length: 2.287 km (1.421 miles)
- Race length: 91.48 km (56.84 miles)

Last race (2020)

Pole position
- (New Zealand) Mitch Evans; Jaguar Racing; 1:04.827

Podium
- 1. (Germany) Maximilian Günther; BMW i Andretti Motorsport; 2. (Portugal) António Félix da Costa; DS Techeetah; +2.067; 3. (New Zealand) Mitch Evans; Jaguar Racing; +5.119

Fastest lap
- (United Kingdom) Oliver Rowland; Nissan e.dams; 1:06.405

The Santiago ePrix, or, for sponsorship reasons, Antofagasta Minerals Santiago ePrix, was an annual race of the single-seater, electrically powered Formula E championship, held in Santiago, Chile. It was first raced in the 2017–18 season.

== Circuits ==
The original layout of the Parque O'Higgins Circuit, with a chicane on the curving backstraight, used in 2019

The Santiago ePrix was firstly held in a different street circuit, Santiago Street Circuit in 2018.

The first circuit the ePrix was run on was the Santiago Street Circuit, in and around Parque Forestal and other landmarks of the chilean capital, such as the Alameda, Plaza Baquedano, the Gabriela Mistral Cultural Center and the Mapocho River. For the following year, the race was moved inside Parque O'Higgins, the second largest public park of the city, and host of, among other events, the annual music festival Lollapalooza Chile. This was done due to the logistical challenges encountered at the inaugural race, which faced intense opposition from local residents due its use of historical roads through Santiago’s Forestal Park.

== Results ==
Edition	Track	Winner	Second	Third	Pole position	Fastest lap	Ref
2018	Santiago Street Circuit	(France) Jean-Éric Vergne; Techeetah–Renault	(Germany) André Lotterer; Techeetah–Renault	(Switzerland) Sébastien Buemi e.Dams-Renault	(France) Jean-Éric Vergne; Techeetah–Renault	(United Kingdom) Sam Bird; Virgin-Citroën	
2019	Parque O'Higgins Circuit	(United Kingdom) Sam Bird; Enivision Virgin Racing	(Germany) Pascal Wehrlein; Mahindra Racing	(Germany) Daniel Abt; Audi Sport ABT Schaeffler	(Switzerland) Sébastien Buemi; Nissan e.dams	(Germany) Daniel Abt; Audi Sport ABT Schaeffler	
2020	Parque O'Higgins Circuit	(Germany) Maximilian Günther; BMW i Andretti Motorsport	(Portugal) António Félix da Costa; DS Techeetah	(New Zealand) Mitch Evans; Jaguar Racing	(New Zealand) Mitch Evans; Jaguar Racing	(United Kingdom) Oliver Rowland; Nissan e.dams	
