= 2019 Santiago ePrix =

Car race

Race 3 of 13 of the 2018–19 Formula E season
← Previous race	Next race →

Race details
- Date: 26 January 2019
- Official name: 2019 Antofagasta Minerals Santiago E-Prix
- Location: Parque O'Higgins Circuit, Santiago
- Course: Street Circuit
- Course length: 2.348 kilometres (1.459 mi)
- Distance: 36 laps, 84.528 km (52.523 mi)
- Weather: Sunny

Pole position
Driver	(Switzerland) Sebastien Buemi	e.dams−Nissan
- Time: 1:08.816

Fastest lap
Driver	(Germany) Daniel Abt	Audi
- Time: 1:11.263 on lap 25

Podium
First	(United Kingdom) Sam Bird	Virgin−Audi
Second	(Germany) Pascal Wehrlein	Mahindra
Third	(Germany) Daniel Abt	Audi

The 2019 Santiago ePrix (formally the 2019 Antofagasta Minerals Santiago E-Prix) was a Formula E electric car race held at the Parque O'Higgins Circuit in the Parque O'Higgins of Santiago, Chile on 27 January 2019. It was the third round of the 2018–19 Formula E season and the second annual edition of the event. Sam Bird won the 36 lap race, with Pascal Wehrlein finishing second, in what was his 2nd race in the championship, while Daniel Abt came home in third place. Following the race, Bird led the championship, edging out Jerome d'Ambrosio by 2 points.

== Report ==
=== Background ===
The 2019 Santiago ePrix was confirmed to be taking place as part of the 2018-19 FIA ABB Formula E Championship, on 9 October 2018, with a new circuit in Parque O'Higgins, replacing the previous track in the Parque Forestal following opposition from residents. The new Parque O'Higgins Circuit layout was also revealed on the day itself, with it being planned to be a 2.4 km long track, subjected to FIA Homologation. The track utilised roads in the Parque O'Higgins, with feedback from local residents being sought to minimize any disruption to them during the race. Ultimately, the track was successfully homologated according to its original design. Ahead of the race, a layer of new asphalt was laid in the park in November 2018, with parts of the circuit using the new surface, while the rest including the start/finish straight, was an old concrete layer.

=== Practice ===
Lucas di Grassi topped the timesheets in what was an interrupted Free Practice 1 at Santiago, with running halted midway by a red flag, following a crash by Season 2 champion, Sebastien Buemi. Di Grassi posted a best time of 1:08.630 on a 250 kW run in the closing stages of FP1 to go 0.146 seconds quicker than Pascal Wehrlein's Mahindra, with Sam Bird coming in 3rd for Envision Virgin Racing, 0.358 seconds behind Di Grassi, with his Virgin teammate Frijns coming in at just 0.071 seconds behind him. Reigning Champion Jean-Eric Vergne came in P5, while Ad Diriyah race winner, Antonio Felix Da Costa came in P6. All 22 drivers set flying laps, with the top 11 separated by less than a second. The most serious incident of the session came for Buemi with a crash at Turn 7. The red flag was brought out for 17 minutes, suspending the session, while Buemi's Nissan was retrieved, and subsequently, the session was extended by ten minutes to compensate for some of the lost time.

In Free Practice 2, José María López would lead a pack of 3 Audi-powered cars after the 30-minute session, with him setting a best time of 1:08.194 in his Dragon Racing Penske EV-3, going just 0.066 seconds quicker than Robin Frijns in his customer Envision Virgin Racing Audi. Frijns's Virgin teammate Sam Bird was classified fourth, behind the factory Audi of Lucas di Grassi in third. The session was free of any major incidents, although some drivers, including rookie driver Felipe Massa, went into the run-off area around the track, whilst Andre Lotterer made brief contact with the tire wall. Sebastien Buemi managed to get back out on track after a crash in Free Practice 1 and finished the session 15th in his Nissan. All 22 drivers set flying laps in what was a tightly contested session, with the top 17 covered by a little over 0.7 seconds.

=== Qualifying ===
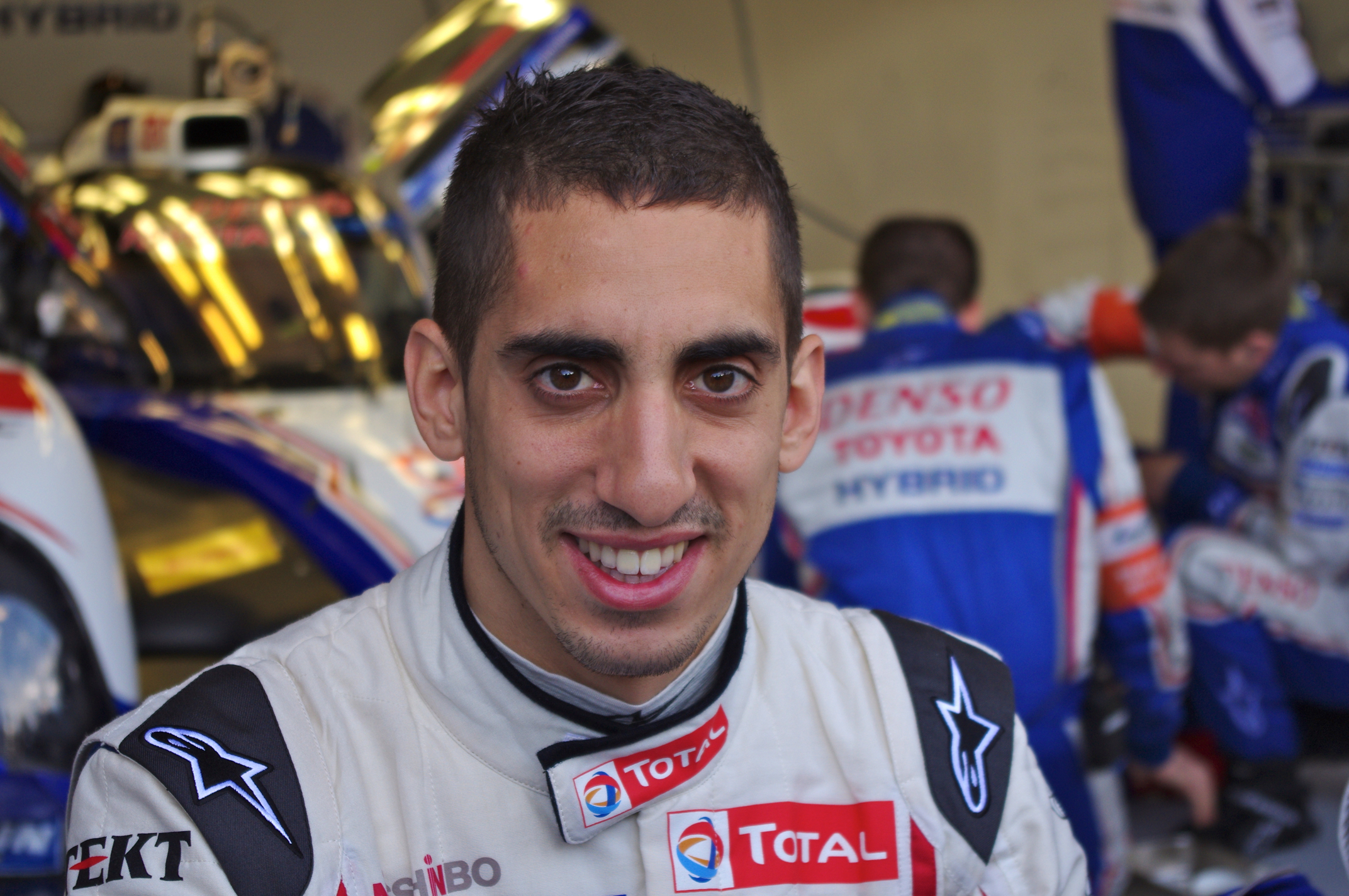
Sebastien Buemi, pictured here in 2013, inherited Pole Position, following a penalty for Lucas Di Grassi over a brake infringement

Lucas di Grassi had been set to start the race from pole position after the Audi Sport ABT Schaeffler driver went quickest by a considerable margin in Super Pole, posting a time of 1:08.290 to go 0.526 seconds clear of Sebastien Buemi in an uncharacteristically spaced-out Super Pole session. It would have marked the second consecutive pole for Audi-powered cars in Season Five of the ABB FIA Formula E Championship after Sam Bird's pole run in Marrakech for customer team Envision Virgin Racing. However, Sebastien Buemi inherited pole position for the race, after di Grassi was penalized following a stewards’ investigation into his brake usage on his in-lap after his group qualifying run. Di Grassi was found to have used the brakes on his Audi e-tron FE05 more during the in-lap than on the flying lap, violating a new rule that was introduced prior to the race concerning brake usage, believed to have been brought in following Tom Dillmann’s brake failure in Marrakesh, which resulted in his parc ferme collision with Robin Frijns. The Audi Sport ABT Schaeffler driver therefore had his qualifying times deleted, including his pole-setting Super Pole time, and will start from the back of the grid. As such, all drivers were promoted by 1 spot, with Pascal Wehrlein qualifying third, ahead of di Grassi's teammate Daniel Abt, while Bird made it three Audis in Super Pole, qualifying fourth and fifth place on the grid went to Stoffel Vandoorne for Venturi.

Several leading drivers failed to make it through to Super Pole, including reigning champion Jean-Eric Vergne who complained about the qualifying format on the live stream, owing to the disadvantaged track conditions for the Group 1 drivers.

=== Race ===
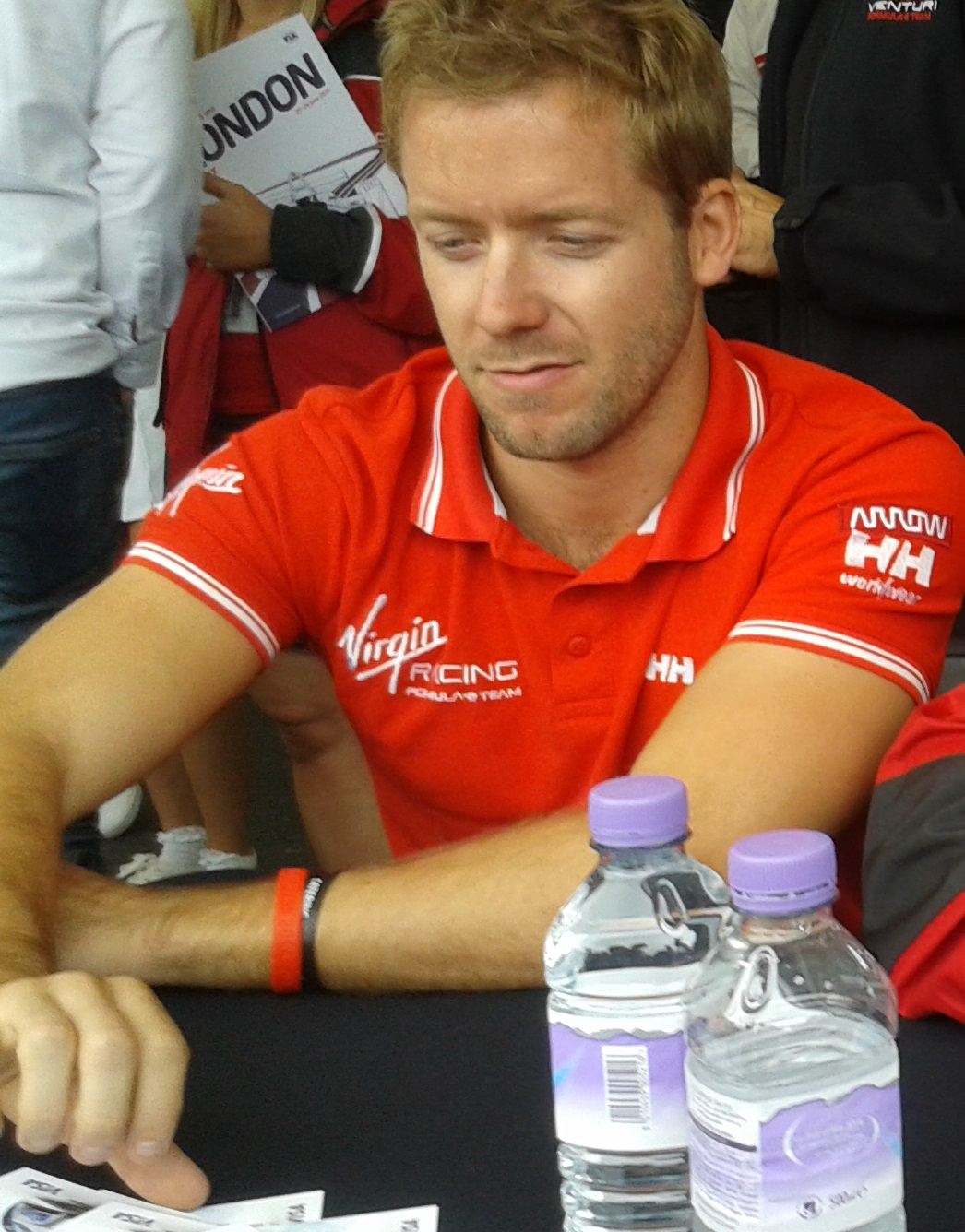
Sam Bird, seen here in 2015, won the race

Sam Bird successfully defended from Pascal Wehrlein to win the Santiago ePrix, scoring his first ABB FIA Formula E Championship win since Rome the previous season. While Bird was forced to nurse his Audi e-tron FE05 home with low energy levels on the final lap, he also benefited from Wehrlein also being forced to slow down to prevent overheating on his Mahindra M5Electro, due to the high ambient temperatures at the race, which saw temperatures peak at 38.0°C. While Bird's victory was briefly uncertain following the race, as he faced an investigation for his car possibly being underweight, it was later quickly clarified that no further action would be taken. This win meant of continuation Bird's streak of winning at least one race in every Formula E season, and bringing him into the championship lead, overtaking Marrakesh winner Jerome d'Ambrosio by a point. d'Ambrosio's Mahindra Racing teammate Pascal Wehrlein held on, to finish runner-up in his second Formula E race after using his attack mode to pressure Bird for the lead in the last six minutes. Alexander Sims had appeared set to make it two rookie drivers on the podium, but was given a drive-through penalty which was later converted to a post-race time penalty, for causing a collision with Edoardo Mortara earlier in the race, dropping him back to eighth. As a result of the penalty, Daniel Abt was promoted up to third position, making it two Audis cars finishing on the podium, ahead of Edoardo Mortara in fourth and Bird's Envision Virgin teammate Robin Frijns completing the top five. Mitch Evans took sixth for Jaguar, while D’Ambrosio finished eighth after a difficult weekend for the Belgian which saw him qualify near the back of the field on account of running in the disadvantaged first qualifying group. Oliver Turvey ending up ninth for NIO, while José María López, who had finished seventh on the road was dropped down to 10th for exceeding maximum power. Nelson Piquet Jr. finished 11th, while Abt's teammate, Lucas di Grassi wound up 12th in the final order after a 10-second stop-and-go penalty was converted into a post-race time penalty, for causing a collision with Lopez.

It was a race of attrition, which saw only 14 of 22 cars which started the race finishing, following a number of collisions between drivers and technical issues worsened by the hot weather conditions. Among the retirees were Antonio Felix da Costa, who won the opening race of the season in Ad Diriyah, and reigning champion Jean-Eric Vergne, with both drivers colliding on the final corner on lap 8, as well as race polesitter Sebastien Buemi. Buemi had led the race from pole position but crashed out from the lead during the second half when he locked up at the chicane, which forced him to limp home to the pits, and ultimately retire due to the damage sustained to the car.

== Classification ==
=== Qualifying ===
Pos.	No.	Driver	Team	Time	Gap	Grid
1	11	(Brazil) Lucas di Grassi	Audi	1:08.290	-	22^{1}
2	23	(Switzerland) Sébastien Buemi	e.Dams-Nissan	1:08.816	+0.526	1
3	94	(Germany) Pascal Wehrlein	Mahindra	1:08.925	+0.635	2
4	66	(Germany) Daniel Abt	Audi	1:08.958	+0.668	3
5	2	(United Kingdom) Sam Bird	Virgin-Audi	1:08.958	+0.963	4
6	5	(Belgium) Stoffel Vandoorne	HWA-Venturi	—^{2}		5
7	48	(Switzerland) Edoardo Mortara	Venturi	1:09.042	—	6
8	6	(Germany) Maximilian Günther	Dragon-Penske	1:09.143	+0.101	7
9	27	(United Kingdom) Alexander Sims	Andretti-BMW	1:09.147	+0.105	8
10	19	(Brazil) Felipe Massa	Venturi	1:09.168	+0.126	9
11	7	(Argentina) José María López	Dragon-Penske	1:09.201	+0.159	10
12	20	(New Zealand) Mitch Evans	Jaguar	1:09.235	+0.193	11
13	25	(France) Jean Eric Vergne	Techeetah-DS	1:09.307	+0.265	12
14	22	(United Kingdom) Oliver Rowland	e.Dams-Nissan	1:09.365	+0.323	13
15	36	(Germany) Andre Lotterer	Techeetah-DS	1:09.485	+0.443	14
16	4	(Netherlands) Robin Frijns	Virgin-Audi	1:09.505	+0.463	15
17	17	(United Kingdom) Gary Paffett	HWA-Venturi	1:09.505	+0.463	16
18	28	(Portugal) Antonio Felix da Costa	Andretti-BMW	1:09.551	+0.509	17
19	16	(United Kingdom) Oliver Turvey	NIO	1:09.645	+0.603	18
20	3	(Brazil) Nelson Piquet Jr.	Jaguar	1:09.705	+0.663	19
21	64	(Belgium) Jérôme d'Ambrosio	Mahindra	1:10.083	+1.041	20
22	8	(France) Tom Dillmann	NIO	1:10.258	+1.216	21

Notes

- ^1 — Lucas Di Grassi was demoted to the back of the grid for brake infringement.
- ^2 — Stoffel Vandoorne had all of his lap times deleted for missing the red light at the pit exit during Super Pole session.

=== Race ===
Pos.	No.	Driver	Team	Laps	Time/Retired	Grid	Points
1	2	(United Kingdom) Sam Bird	Virgin-Audi	36	47:02:511	4	25
2	94	(Germany) Pascal Wehrlein	Mahindra	36	+6.489	2	18
3	66	(Germany) Daniel Abt	Audi	36	+14.529	3	15+1^{8}
4	48	(Switzerland) Edoardo Mortara	Venturi	36	+17.056	6	12
5	4	(Netherlands) Robin Frijns	Virgin-Audi	36	+20.276	15	10
6	20	(New Zealand) Mitch Evans	Jaguar	36	+23.755	11	8
7	27	(United Kingdom) Alexander Sims	Andretti-BMW	36	+27.590^{3}	8	6
8	16	(United Kingdom) Oliver Turvey	NIO	36	+45.059	18	4
9	7	(Argentina) José María López	Dragon-Penske	36	+45.376^{4}	10	2
10	64	(Belgium) Jérôme d'Ambrosio	Mahindra	36	+46.984^{5}	20	1
11	3	(Brazil) Nelson Piquet Jr.	Jaguar	36	+48.635	19	0
12	11	(Brazil) Lucas di Grassi	Audi	36	+1:03.552^{6}	22	0
13	36	(Germany) André Lotterer	Techeetah-DS	36	+1:19.706^{7}	14	0
14	17	(United Kingdom) Gary Paffett	HWA-Venturi	35	+1 lap	16	0
Ret	22	(United Kingdom) Oliver Rowland	e.Dams-Nissan	31	Collision	13	0
Ret	28	(Portugal) António Félix da Costa	Andretti-BMW	23	Hydraulics	17	0
Ret	25	(France) Jean-Éric Vergne	Techeetah-DS	22	Engine	12	0
Ret	23	(Switzerland) Sébastien Buemi	e.Dams-Nissan	21	Suspension	1	3^{9}
Ret	5	(Belgium) Stoffel Vandoorne	HWA-Venturi	17	Brakes/Accident	5	0
Ret	6	(Germany) Maximilian Günther	Dragon-Penske	12	Gearbox	7	0
Ret	19	(Brazil) Felipe Massa	Venturi	12	Suspension	9	0
Ret	8	(France) Tom Dillmann	NIO	10	Retirement	21	0

- ^3 — Alexander Sims received a drive through penalty converted into a 19-second time penalty for causing a collision
- ^4 — José María López received a drive through penalty converted into a 19-second time penalty for exceeding power usages
- ^5 — Jérôme d'Ambrosio received 5-second time penalty for over speeding under Full Course Yellow
- ^6 — Lucas di Grassi received a 10-second stop and go penalty converted into a 34-second time penalty for causing a collision
- ^7 — André Lotterer received 5-second time penalty for overtaking under Yellow Flag
- ^8 — Fastest lap.
- ^9 — Pole position.

== Standings after the race ==
Drivers' Championship standings

+/–	Pos	Driver	Points
5	1	(United Kingdom) Sam Bird	43
1	2	(Belgium) Jérôme d'Ambrosio	41
1	3	(Portugal) António Félix da Costa	28
1	4	(Netherlands) Robin Frijns	28
2	5	(France) Jean-Éric Vergne	28

Teams' Championship standings

+/–	Pos	Constructor	Points
3	1	(United Kingdom) Virgin-Audi	71
	2	(India) Mahindra	59
2	3	(China) Techeetah-Citroën	47
1	4	(United States) Andretti-BMW	46
1	5	(Germany) Audi Sport ABT Schaeffler	30

Previous race: 2019 Marrakesh ePrix	FIA Formula E Championship; 2018–19 season	Next race: 2019 Mexico City ePrix
Previous race: 2018 Santiago ePrix	Santiago ePrix	Next race: 2020 Santiago ePrix
