= 2020 Santiago ePrix =

Race 3 of 11 of the 2019–20 Formula E season
← Previous race	Next race →

Race details
- Date: 18 January 2020
- Official name: 2020 Antofagasta Minerals Santiago E-Prix
- Location: Parque O'Higgins Circuit, Santiago
- Course: Semi-permanent circuit
- Course length: 2.287 km (1.421 mi)
- Distance: 40 laps, 91.480 km (56.843 mi)
- Weather: Dry
- Attendance: 740 (Note: The 2020 Santiago ePrix was held by reduced attendance due to the Chilean protests.)

Pole position
Driver	(New Zealand) Mitch Evans	Jaguar
- Time: 1:04.827

Fastest lap
Driver	(United Kingdom) Oliver Rowland	e.dams-Nissan
- Time: 1:06.405 on lap 26

Podium
First	(Germany) Maximilian Günther	Andretti-BMW
Second	(Portugal) António Félix da Costa	Techeetah-DS
Third	(New Zealand) Mitch Evans	Jaguar

The 2020 Santiago ePrix (formally the 2020 Antofagasta Minerals Santiago E-Prix) was a Formula E electric car race held at the Parque O'Higgins Circuit in the Parque O'Higgins of Santiago, Chile on 18 January 2020. It served as the third round of the 2019–20 Formula E season and was the third annual edition of the event. The race was won by Maximilian Günther, driving for BMW i Andretti Motorsport, who started from 2nd on the grid, and became the youngest ever Formula E race winner, with António Félix da Costa coming in second, while pole-sitter Mitch Evans finished the race third.

Finishing in 6th overall was sufficient to elevate Stoffel Vandoorne to the top the Drivers' Championship standings with 38, after the then-championship leader, Alexander Sims retired from the race with collision damage, demoting him to second, with 35 points. Sam Bird's 10th place and fastest lap point enabled him to stay 3rd in the championship standings, with 28 points, while Günther's race win elevated him to 4th in the championship standings, with 25 points. Lucas di Grassi's recovery drive from 22nd on the grid to 7th, netting him 6 points was also sufficient to keep him 5th in the championship standings, with 24 points.

In the Teams' Championship, BMW i Andretti Motorsport led with 60 points, while the Mercedes-Benz EQ Formula E Team slid to 2nd, with 56 points. Envision Virgin Racing slid to 3rd, with 38 points, while Audi Sport Abt Schaeffler remained in 4th, with 32 points. Panasonic Jaguar Racing rose to 5th, with 31 points.

== Report ==
=== Background ===
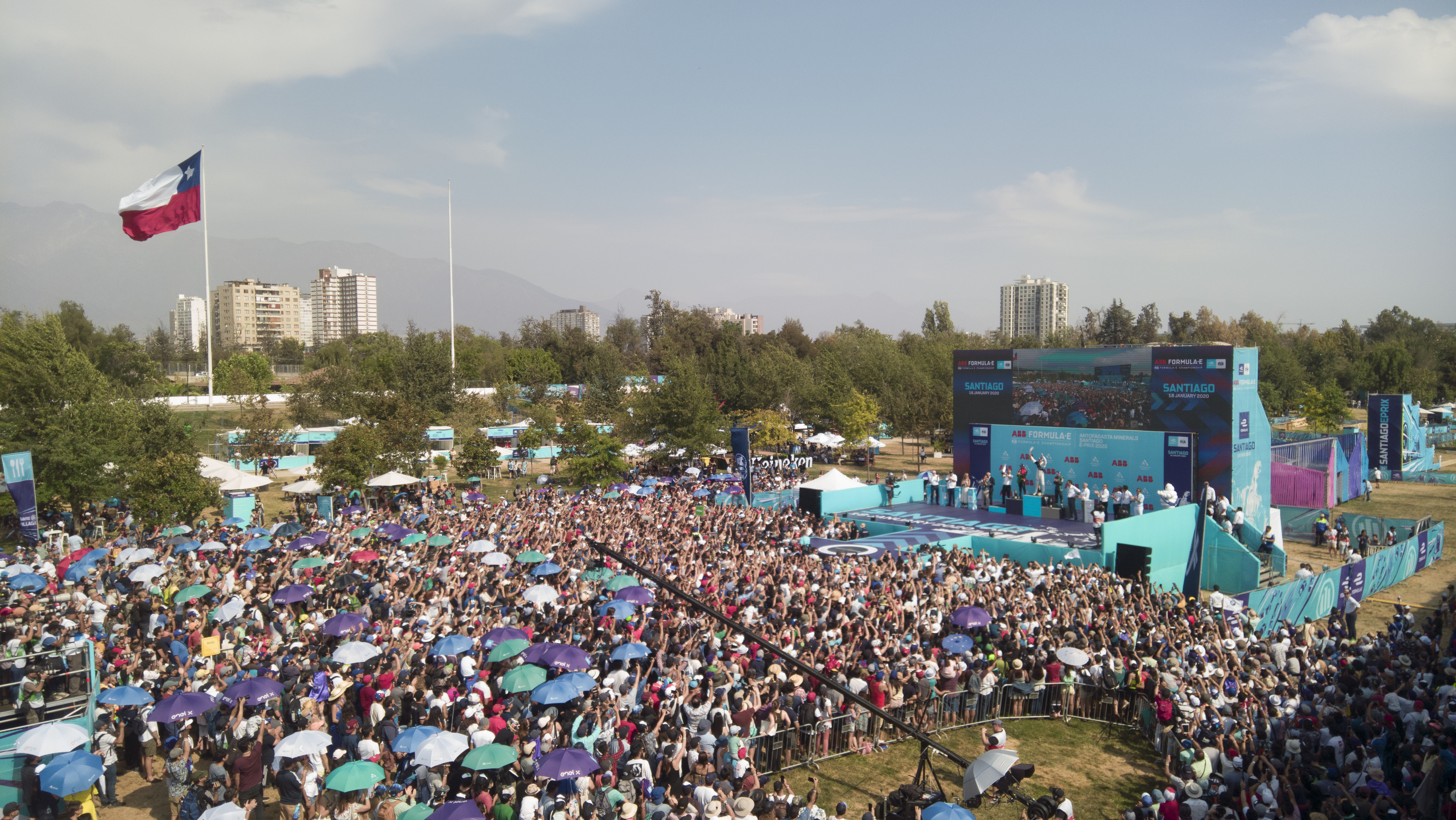
Drivers on the podium after the 2020 Santiago ePrix race

On 15 June 2019, Formula E announced the provisional calendar for the 2019–20 Formula E season, which would be the sixth season of the championship, with 14 races to be held across 12 cities globally. On this provisional calendar, the Santiago ePrix was planned as the 4th round of the championship.

On 5 October 2019, Formula E announced the finalised calendar for the season, which would see 14 races to be held across 12 cities globally. This finalised calendar would see the race bumped up to the 3rd round of the championship, with the TBA round in December being cancelled.

==== Pre-race concerns ====
Ahead of the race, in November 2019, concerns were raised about the race, due to the 2019–20 Chilean protests, which had seen postponements and suspensions of football fixtures earlier in the month, with the APEC and COP25 summits, which had been set to be hosted in the city also being cancelled, while the Copa Libertadores final was moved to Lima, Peru and Rally Chile was cancelled. In spite of the concerns, the event was officially launched of 13 November, while Formula E would continue to monitor the social-political situation in the city. Formula E later reaffirmed its commitment to racing the city, while it was later revealed that unlike Rally Chile, the race was privately funded, with the money needed to put on the race in Santiago's O'Higgins Park coming from the event organisers, without government funding.

==== Track changes ====
Formula E 2020 Santiago ePrix track

Ahead of the race, changes to the track layout were made, most notably at the curving back straight, where the chicane was removed, while the pit lane was moved to the other side of the track, to the inside of the circuit. In addition, the sweeping right hander which was the former Turn 1 was modified, with a new left hander being added ahead of the revised corner. The final sector of the lap also saw changes, with the zig-zagging section of the track being reversed compared to the previous year. The removal of the chicane came as Formula E looked to reduce the number of chicanes on the tracks in the championship, in the wake of several accidents happening at such locations in several races, with the highest profile incident seeing a pile-up at the first corner during the 2019 Swiss ePrix blocking the track, and causing a lengthy red flag period.

=== Qualifying ===
Mitch Evans scored both his, and Jaguar Racing's 2nd ever pole in the ABB Formula E Championship, after topping the timesheets in both the qualifying groups, and the Superpole shootout. During the superpole shootout, he denied Maximilian Günther pole by a margin of nearly 3 tenths, after clocking in an impressive time at the final sector of the track, being 0.22s faster than the rest of the competition, despite being the last to leave the pits for the track. Prior to the Kiwi's sensational run in the final sector of the track, it had appeared that the German would be set to clinch his first ever Formula E pole, having clocked the fastest time in the first 2 sectors of the track, to beat his fellow countryman, Pascal Wehrlein to provisional pole by nearly 6 tenths. The Mahindra driver had left the pits first for his Superpole lap, and ended up posting a lap slower than his effort in the Group stage. Felipe Massa came in fourth, edging out Oliver Turvey, who had posted a phenomenal time in the final sector during the Group 4 session, in his NIO 333 machine. Season 2 champion Sébastien Buemi came in 6th, and last in the Superpole session, after posting 2 slow sectors in his Nissan.

Behind the superpole runners, qualifying 7th was the Venturi run Mercedes of Edoardo Mortara, who had his lap affected, due to an incident with fellow Group 2 runner Robin Frijns, after Frijns experienced a spin on his flying lap. A massive rear end snap under braking spun Frijns around on the approach to Turn 1, where he barely missed the tyre wall. As he attempted to rejoin the track, the Dutchman delayed Mortara by around 0.4 seconds. In spite of this, Mortara was still able to set the fastest time in Group 2, courtesy of a strong final sector, and held provisional pole at the time. Behind Mortara were the 2 factory-run Mercedes of Nyck de Vries, and his teammate Stoffel Vandoorne, while António Félix da Costa rounded out the top 10, in his DS Techeetah. Reigning series champion Jean-Éric Vergne's tricky start to the season continued, the Frenchman coming in P11, over a second slower than his teammate, ahead of the leading Porsche of Neel Jani. Daniel Abt, in the lead Audi took 13th, ahead of the second Porsche of André Lotterer. Alexander Sims saw his pole streak come to an end, the championship leader coming in 15th, ahead of the Envision Virgin Racing run Audi of Sam Bird, and the Dragon-Penske of Brendon Hartley. James Calado came in 18th, while the sister Dragon car of Nico Müller came in 19th. Jérôme d'Ambrosio suffered car trouble towards the end of his flying lap, leaving him languishing down in 20th, after failing to start the second race at Ad Diriyah due to a technical issue.

Behind d'Ambrosio, was the Virgin run Audi of Frijns, his spin dealing him a penalty in terms of his final laptime, while Lucas di Grassi had his lap affected by a crash by Oliver Rowland, which initially cost him a few tenths, before the Season 3 champion ruined his own laptime by running wide at Turn 9. Behind him, was the Nissan of Rowland, the Brit crashing heavily during the Group 1 session, and forcing his team, e.DAMS to scramble against the clock to prepare his car in time for the race. Ma Qinghua propped up the grid, and did not participate in the session, after he crashed in Practice 2, and the NIO 333 FE Team mechanics were unable to repair his car in time for the session.

=== Race ===
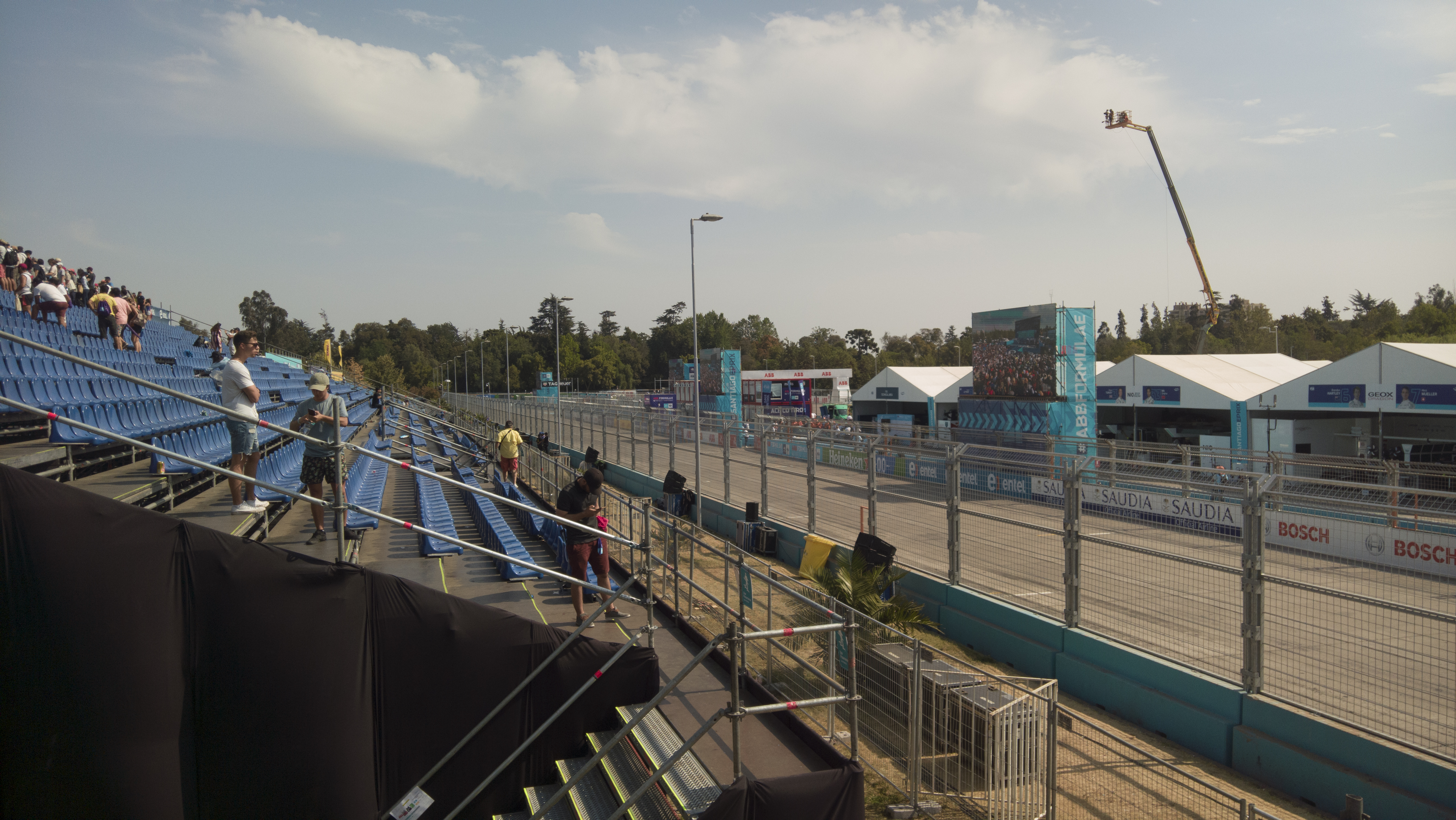
Straight of the Parque O'Higgins Circuit after the race

Maximilian Günther scored his first ever Formula E race victory, becoming the youngest ever Formula E race winner, after triumphing in a last lap battle with António Félix da Costa. Polesitter Mitch Evans came in 3rd for Panasonic Jaguar Racing, benefitting from a penalty issued to Nyck de Vries, who had come in third on the road. De Vries lost his maiden podium, due to an infringement of the minimum battery coolant temperature. This penalty also bumped Pascal Wehrlein to fourth overall in the pecking order.

At the start, Evans held the lead off the line, while Mahindra Racing's Pascal Wehrlein forced his way past Günther, who suffered from a poor start, at the tight off-track approach to Turn 2, which the field used throughout the race. Following this, Günther gradually fell down the order, while Evans consolidated his lead out front.

From this point onwards, the race quietened down, until past the 40th minute, when Günther's teammate, the championship leader Alexander Sims, ground to a halt on track, prompting a full-course yellow, while the stewards removed his car, with the FCY being lifted at the 37 minute mark on the clock. In less than a lap after the restart, Oliver Rowland made contact with Sam Bird, damaging his front wing and putting Bird into a spin. Rowland would enter the pits to replace the wing shortly after the incident.

Using his Attack Mode power boost, Günther advanced on Edoardo Mortara, using the extra power to sweep past the Venturi driver and to move back into third. With Mortara in fourth and his teammate Felipe Massa in fifth, the two Venturi cars trailed the podium sitters, seemingly ready to pick up a podium, should any of the top 3 suffer from issues. However, this was not to be, as the duo activated Attack Mode against each other in a bid to attack overtake and defend from the other. Heading into Turn 10, Mortara made a lunge on Massa, putting the Brazilian into the wall, dropping him into Seventh. Reigning champion Jean-Eric Vergne took advantage of this, to slip into 5th.

Meanwhile, up front, Günther activated Attack Mode to pass Wehrlein for second and with still a minute on his attack mode, Günther went for the lead, slipping past Evans on the approach to Turn 9, the extra power on hand for the German giving the Kiwi no chance to defend his position.

With 14 minutes to go, Vergne and his teammate António Félix da Costa became the next drivers to pass the Mahindra of Pascal Wehrlein, the pair bumping Wehrlein down to fifth. Having made eight-places since the start of the race, damage to Vergne's front wing finally appeared to be affecting the Frenchman's car, his front-left tire starting to rub on the wing, leaving a trail of smoke behind him. Just 2 laps later, with just seven minutes to go, the wing broke, forcing the reigning champion into the pits.

Following this, Da Costa passed Evans on the long Turn 8, and set about hunting down Günther for the win. With both cars coming into Turn 10 together, Da Costa forced the BMW driver wide, locking up his fronts at the turn-10 hairpin and bumping along the side of the BMW, pulling into first place. However, in spite of this, Da Costa soon found his lead under threat from Günther, due to him having to nurse battery temperatures, and on the last lap, Günther (BMW iFE.20) stormed past Da Costa at Turn 9 (DS E-TENSE FE20), pulling away from the Portuguese, and winning by a margin of 2.067s.

== Classification ==
=== Qualifying ===
Group draw
Group 1	(United Kingdom) SIM (1)	(Belgium) VAN (2)	(United Kingdom) BIR (3)	(United Kingdom) ROW (4)	(Brazil) DIG (5)	(Germany) LOT (6)
Group 2	(Switzerland) MOR (7)	(Netherlands) FRI (8)	(Netherlands) DEV (9)	(Germany) ABT (10)	(United Kingdom) CAL (11)	(France) JEV (12)
Group 3	(Portugal) DAC (13)	(New Zealand) HAR (14)	(Belgium) DAM (15)	(New Zealand) EVA (16)	(Germany) WEH (17)	(Germany) GUE (18)
Group 4	(Brazil) MAS (19)	(Switzerland) BUE (20)	(Switzerland) JAN (21)	(United Kingdom) TUR (22)	(China) QMA (23)	(Switzerland) MUL (24)

Pos.	No.	Driver	Team	GS	SP	Grid
1	20	(New Zealand) Mitch Evans	Jaguar	1:04.941	1:04.827	1
2	28	(Germany) Maximilian Günther	Andretti-BMW	1:05.102	1:05.169	2
3	94	(Germany) Pascal Wehrlein	Mahindra	1:05.525	1:05.645	3
4	19	(Brazil) Felipe Massa	Venturi-Mercedes	1:05.463	1:05.645	4
5	3	(United Kingdom) Oliver Turvey	NIO	1:05.510	1:05.788	5
6	23	(Switzerland) Sébastien Buemi	e.dams-Nissan	1:05.390	1:05.809	6
7	48	(Switzerland) Edoardo Mortara	Venturi-Mercedes	1:05.547	—N/a	7
8	17	(Netherlands) Nyck de Vries	Mercedes	1:05.560	—N/a	8
9	5	(Belgium) Stoffel Vandoorne	Mercedes	1:05.566	—N/a	9
10	13	(Portugal) António Félix da Costa	Techeetah-DS	1:05.574	—N/a	10
11	25	(France) Jean-Éric Vergne	Techeetah-DS	1:05.625	—N/a	11
12	18	(Switzerland) Neel Jani	Porsche	1:05.696	—N/a	12
13	66	(Germany) Daniel Abt	Audi	1:05.745	—N/a	13
14	36	(Germany) André Lotterer	Porsche	1:05.801	—N/a	14
15	27	(United Kingdom) Alexander Sims	Andretti-BMW	1:05.848	—N/a	15
16	2	(United Kingdom) Sam Bird	Virgin-Audi	1:05.886	—N/a	16
17	6	(New Zealand) Brendon Hartley	Dragon-Penske	1:06.126	—N/a	17
18	51	(United Kingdom) James Calado	Jaguar	1:06.305	—N/a	18
19	7	(Switzerland) Nico Müller	Dragon-Penske	1:06.367	—N/a	19
20	64	(Belgium) Jérôme d'Ambrosio	Mahindra	1:07.692	—N/a	20
21	4	(Netherlands) Robin Frijns	Virgin-Audi	1:09.089	—N/a	21
22	11	(Brazil) Lucas di Grassi	Audi	1:26.526	—N/a	22
23	22	(United Kingdom) Oliver Rowland	e.dams-Nissan	no time^{1}	—N/a	23
24	33	(China) Ma Qinghua	NIO	no time	—N/a	24^{2}

Notes:

- ^1 – Oliver Rowland was asked to exit the Parc fermé before other cars released to allow repairs at the cars because of an incident during the session, and his lap time was deleted as a result.
- ^2 – Ma Qinghua did not take part in his session as repairs were continuing after his crash in Free Practice 2. Ma was given permission to start from the back of the grid.

=== Race ===
Pos.	No.	Driver	Team	Laps	Time/Retired	Grid	Points
1	28	(Germany) Maximilian Günther	Andretti-BMW	40	46:11.511	2	25
2	13	(Portugal) António Félix da Costa	Techeetah-DS	40	+2.067	10	18
3	20	(New Zealand) Mitch Evans	Jaguar	40	+5.119	1	15+1+3^{7}
4	94	(Germany) Pascal Wehrlein	Mahindra	40	+7.050	3	12
5	17	(Netherlands) Nyck de Vries	Mercedes	40	+9.883^{1}	8	10
6	5	(Belgium) Stoffel Vandoorne	Mercedes	40	+11.237	9	8
7	11	(Brazil) Lucas di Grassi	Audi	40	+14.437	22	6
8	51	(United Kingdom) James Calado	Jaguar	40	+18.255	18	4
9	19	(Brazil) Felipe Massa	Venturi-Mercedes	40	+20.430	4	2
10	2	(United Kingdom) Sam Bird	Virgin-Audi	40	+21.780	16	1+1^{8}
11	3	(United Kingdom) Oliver Turvey	NIO	40	+27.778	5	
12	7	(Switzerland) Nico Müller	Dragon-Penske	40	+33.786^{2}	19	
13	23	(Switzerland) Sébastien Buemi	e.dams-Nissan	40	+43.257^{3}	6	
14	66	(Germany) Daniel Abt	Audi	40	+47.198^{4}	13	
15	4	(Netherlands) Robin Frijns	Virgin-Audi	39	+1 Lap	21	
16	33	(China) Ma Qinghua	NIO	39	+1 Lap^{5}	24	
17	22	(United Kingdom) Oliver Rowland	e.dams-Nissan	36	+4 Laps	23	
NC	64	(Belgium) Jérôme d'Ambrosio	Mahindra	40	+1:57.624^{3}	20	
Ret	6	(New Zealand) Brendon Hartley	Dragon-Penske	35	Retired in pits	17	
Ret	25	(France) Jean-Éric Vergne	Techeetah-DS	32	Front wing damage	11	
Ret	48	(Switzerland) Edoardo Mortara	Venturi-Mercedes	29	Collision damage	7	
Ret	27	(United Kingdom) Alexander Sims	Andretti-BMW	4	Collision damage	15	
Ret	16	(Switzerland) Neel Jani	Porsche	2	Collision damage	12	
DSQ^{6}	36	(Germany) André Lotterer	Porsche	28	Energy overusage (Collision damage)	14	

Notes:

- ^1 – Nyck de Vries received a five-second time penalty for not respecting the minimum coolant temperature.
- ^2 – Nico Müller received a ten-second penalty for causing a collision.
- ^3 – Sébastien Buemi and Jérôme d'Ambrosio both received a drive-through penalty converted into a 30-second time penalty for not respecting the homologated throttle pedal map.
- ^4 – Daniel Abt received a drive-through penalty converted into a 30-second time penalty for causing a collision.
- ^5 – Ma Qinghua received a five-second penalty for not respecting the power availability and a ten-second stop-and-go penalty converted into a 45-second time penalty for not using the attack mode.
- ^6 – André Lotterer was disqualified from the race for exceeding the maximum power usage of 200 kW (230.51 kW).
- ^7 – Fastest in group stage; pole.
- ^8 – Fastest lap.

== Standings after the race ==
Drivers' Championship standings

+/–	Pos	Driver	Points
1	1	(Belgium) Stoffel Vandoorne	38
1	2	(United Kingdom) Alexander Sims	35 (–3)
	3	(United Kingdom) Sam Bird	28 (–10)
14	4	(Germany) Maximilian Günther	25 (–13)
	5	(Brazil) Lucas di Grassi	24 (–14)

Teams' Championship standings

+/–	Pos	Constructor	Points
1	1	(United States) Andretti-BMW	60
1	2	(Germany) Mercedes	56 (–4)
1	3	(United Kingdom) Virgin-Audi	38 (–22)
	4	(Germany) Audi	32 (–28)
3	5	(United Kingdom) Jaguar	31 (–29)

- Notes: Only the top five positions are included for both sets of standings.

== Notes ==
Previous race: 2019 Diriyah ePrix	FIA Formula E Championship; 2019–20 season	Next race: 2020 Mexico City ePrix
Previous race: 2019 Santiago ePrix	Santiago ePrix	Next race: N/A
