= 2018 Santiago ePrix =

Race 4 of 12 of the 2017–18 Formula E Championship
← Previous race	Next race →

Race details
- Date: 3 February 2018
- Official name: 2018 Antofagasta Minerals Santiago E-Prix
- Location: Santiago Street Circuit, Santiago
- Course: Street circuit
- Course length: 1.529 miles (2.461 km)
- Distance: 37 laps, 56.603 miles (91.094 km)
- Weather: Sunny

Pole position
Driver	(France) Jean-Éric Vergne	Techeetah-Renault
- Time: 1:19.161

Fastest lap
Driver	(United Kingdom) Sam Bird	Virgin-Citroën
- Time: 1:20.235 on lap 30

Podium
First	(France) Jean-Éric Vergne	Techeetah-Renault
Second	(Germany) André Lotterer	Techeetah-Renault
Third	(Switzerland) Sébastien Buemi	e.Dams-Renault

The 2018 Santiago ePrix (formally the 2018 Antofagasta Minerals Santiago E-Prix) was a Formula E electric car race held at the Santiago Street Circuit in the Chilean capital city of Santiago on 3 February 2018. It was the fourth round of the 2017–18 Formula E Championship and the inaugural running of the event. The 37-lap race was won by Techeetah driver Jean-Éric Vergne from pole position. Vergne's teammate André Lotterer finished second and e.Dams-Renault driver Sébastien Buemi was third.

Vergne won pole position by recording the fastest lap in qualifying, and held off Nelson Piquet Jr. early in the race, which was neutralised for four laps after two cars were left stranded at the side of the track from getting involved in separate accidents on the first lap. Vergne kept the lead after every driver made their mandatory pit stops to enter into a second car and his teammate Lotterer passed Piquet for second. Vergne, who was saving electrical energy due to a loss in pit-to-car radio communication, held off his teammate Lotterer for the rest of the race to win for the second time in Formula E and Lotterer finished second to achieve the first one-two finish in series history.

The result moved Vergne to the lead of the Drivers' Championship for the first time with 71 points, five ahead of previous leader Felix Rosenqvist. Sam Bird finished fifth and fell to third as Buemi's third-place finish moved him to fourth. Techeetah took the lead of the Teams' Championship with Mahindra two points behind in second. Virgin fell to third while e.Dams-Renault moved to fourth with eight races left in the season.

== Background ==
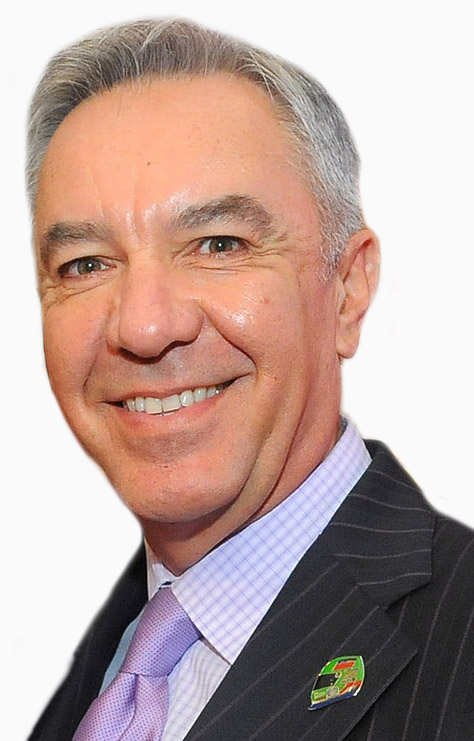
Former driver Eliseo Salazar (pictured in 2011) led negotiations to get Santiago on the Formula E calendar.

In February 2017 a diplomatic committee led by former driver Eliseo Salazar began talking to Formula E CEO Alejandro Agag in Buenos Aires about the possibility of holding a race in the Chilean capital of Santiago. The race was officially confirmed by the world governing body of motorsport, the Fédération Internationale de l'Automobile (FIA), in June, and was added to the 2017–18 Formula E calendar by the FIA World Motor Sport Council three months later. It was the fourth of twelve single seater electric car races of the season and took place on 3 February 2018. Prior to the event, a non-championship Formula One race won by Juan Manuel Fangio was held on the streets of Santiago in 1950. Despite also having hosted regional soccer tournament Copa América (in 1991 and 2015) or Dakar Rally (in 2009, 2010, 2011, 2012, 2013, 2014 and 2015), the press predicted the race would be the largest sporting event in Chile since the 1962 FIFA World Cup, and organisers expected 20,000 people to attend. A total of 20 drivers each representing ten teams of two competitors each were entered for the race.

Heading into the ePrix Mahindra driver Felix Rosenqvist led the Drivers' Championship with 54 points, four ahead of Sam Bird in second and a further seven in front of Jean-Éric Vergne in third. Nelson Piquet Jr. was fourth with 25 points and Edoardo Mortara (24 points) was the highest-placed rookie in fifth. In the Teams' Championship, Mahindra led with 75 points with Virgin 18 points behind in second place. Techeetah and Jaguar were third and fourth with 43 and 40 points respectively and Venturi was fifth with 30 points.

Starting from Santiago, the minimum pit stop time, which had been implemented since the championship began in 2014, was discarded. It came after the world governing body of motorsport, the Fédération Internationale de l'Automobile (FIA), deferred the ruling at the preceding Marrakesh ePrix three weeks before the Santiago race after teams raised concerns over safety. To prepare for the change, chassis manufacturer Spark Racing Technology designed an endurance racing-style seat belt in its aim to improve the efficiency of its application and team and driver safety. Some teams were handed samples to practice with. The FIA later permitted teams to employ spotters behind the pit lane wall and directly opposite their garages to guide drivers into their correct stopping positions. Someone holding a sign to direct the driver into the garages was allowed to move outside the boundaries of their pit box.

The layout of the 1.53-mile (2.46 km) clockwise 12-turn track was unveiled on 12 October 2017. Drivers started on Santa Maria Avenue before crossing the Mapocho River and passed through Parque Forestal before returning to Santa Maria Avenue to finish a lap of the circuit. Construction of the track began on 22 January, 12 days before the race, and finished on 2 February. In response to concerns over several dogs frequenting the Parque Forestal, a local veterinary company was employed to feed them in non-circuit areas in an attempt to stop them straying onto the circuit during the weekend. Piquet believed that the layout of the track would be "technical", while the series manager of the championship's tyre supplier Michelin felt it would be a mixture of the Montreal and the Berlin Street Circuits.

== Practice ==
Cars circulating the track during free practice.

Two practice sessions—both on Saturday morning—were held before the late afternoon race. The first session ran for 45 minutes and the second lasted half an hour. A half an hour untimed shakedown session was held on Friday afternoon to allow teams to check the reliability of their cars and their electronic systems. The track was cleaned overnight after drivers described the tarmac surface as dirty and slippery, but nobody chose to set a lap time at 200 kW (270 hp) as several participants ventured onto the track's run-off areas after locking their tyres. Bird set the fastest lap in the cold first practice session at 1 minute, 19.439 seconds, more than two-tenths of a second faster than any one else on the circuit. Rosenqvist, Vergne, Mitch Evans, André Lotterer, Alex Lynn, José María López, Mortara, Oliver Turvey and Piquet rounded out the top ten drivers. Sébastien Buemi pushed, and lost control of his car's rear after losing grip leaving turn twelve. Buemi struck a tyre barrier, damaging his right-rear suspension and ending his session early. Race director Scot Elkins stopped the session with three minutes to go when Maro Engel locked his brakes and understeered into the turn three TecPro barrier, damaging his front wing. Engel was unhurt.

In the second practice session, Vergne used 200 kW (270 hp) of power to set the fastest lap of the whole race meeting at 1 minute, 18.662 seconds. Lynn followed three-hundredths of a second behind in second and Evans followed in third. The Mahindra duo of Nick Heidfeld and Rosenqvist were fourth and fifth and Bird, Mortara, Daniel Abt, Buemi and Lucas di Grassi completed the top ten ahead of qualifying. Ten minutes into practice, Piquet slid into the turn three run-off area and stopped his vehicle before he could hit the barrier. An oversteer caused López to make light contact with the turn one wall but was able to return to the pit lane and switch into a second car. Nico Prost ran wide driving towards the 90-degree left-hand turn nine and ploughed into the barrier, removing his rear wing, and prematurely ending the session with five minutes remaining.

== Qualifying ==
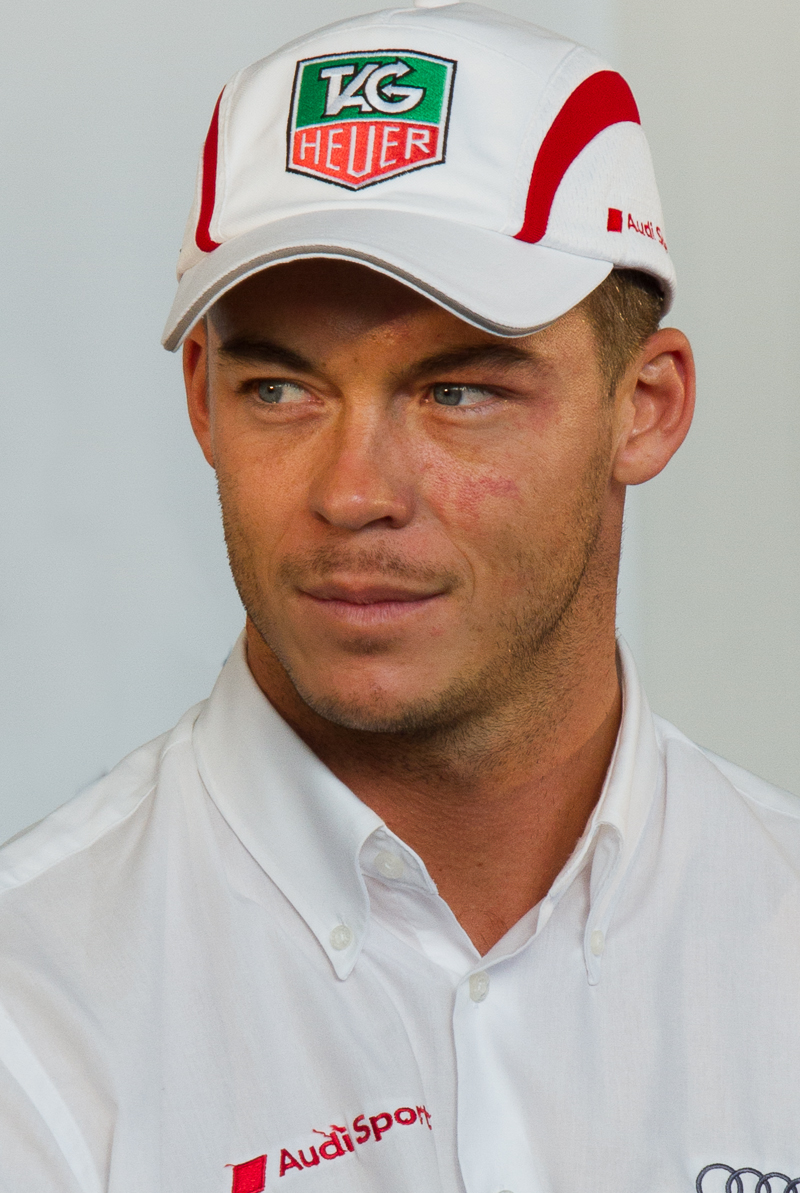
André Lotterer (pictured in 2012) qualified fourth despite damaging his car's rear wing at the start of his super pole lap.

Saturday's afternoon qualifying session ran for an hour and was divided into four groups of five cars. Each group was determined by a lottery system and was permitted six minutes of on-track activity. All drivers were limited to two timed laps with one at maximum power. The fastest five overall competitors in the four groups participated in a "Super Pole" session with one driver on the track at any time going out in reverse order from fifth to first. Each of the five drivers was limited to one timed lap and the starting order was determined by the competitor's fastest times (Super Pole from first to fifth, and group qualifying from sixth to twentieth). The driver and team who recorded the fastest time were awarded three points towards their respective championships. Car grip appeared to be affected as track temperatures rose between second practice and qualifying and saw many drivers glancing or narrowly avoiding the tyre barriers.

In the first group of five runners, Buemi was the early pace setter with Abt second. Heidfeld took third and António Félix da Costa fourth. Evans locked his brakes, meaning he drove straight into the turn three barrier, and began from the tenth row of the grid. Bird was the fastest driver in the second group, followed by Vergne in second and Piquet third. Rosenqvist was fourth-quickest after he made errors, and Mortara locked his front left wheel entering the hairpin, meaning he was the slowest driver in the second group. Lynn led the third group, going a tenth of a second faster than Turvey. Prost was third-fastest while López and Engel rounded out the third group's slowest two drivers. Di Grassi was the initial pace setter in group four until Lotterer surprised everyone by setting the fastest overall lap in group qualifying at 1 minute, 18.796 seconds. Jérôme d'Ambrosio (Dragon), Tom Blomqvist (Andretti) and Luca Filippi (NIO) rounded out group four's top five.

At the end of group qualifying, Lotterer, di Grassi, Bird, Vergne and Buemi qualified for super pole. Vergne took his second pole position of the season and the sixth of his career with a time of 1 minute, 19.161 seconds, and was joined on the grid's front row by Buemi. Di Grassi was unable to replicate his pace from group qualifying and was third. Lotterer hit a bump in the tarmac surface entering turn one, and broke his front wing against the turn one wall. Lotterer slowed for the rest of his lap as the front wing slowly lodged itself under his car's bodywork. Bird lost control of the rear of his car entering the turn five and six double-right hand turn through carrying too much speed into the corner. Bird struck a TecPro barrier with his vehicle's rear but was able to drive back to pit lane for a replacement rear wing and the session was briefly red-flagged. After qualifying, di Grassi was automatically demoted ten places on the grid for changing his inverter, and Prost dropped two places for exceeding the number of permitted laps. The rest of the grid lined up after penalties as Piquet, Lynn, Turvey, López, Abt, Prost, Engel, d'Ambrosio, di Grassi, Rosenqvist, Heidfeld, Félix da Costa, Mortara, Blomqvist, Filippi and Evans.

=== Qualifying classification ===
Final qualifying classification
Pos.	No.	Driver	Team	GS	SP	Grid
1	25	(France) Jean-Éric Vergne	Techeetah-Renault	1:19.124	1:19.161	1
2	9	(Switzerland) Sébastien Buemi	e.Dams-Renault	1:19.182	1:19.355	2
3	1	(Brazil) Lucas di Grassi	Audi	1:19.053	1:19.673	13^{1}
4	18	(Germany) André Lotterer	Techeetah-Renault	1:18.796	1:46.429	3
5	2	(United Kingdom) Sam Bird	Virgin-Citroën	1:19.076	—	4
6	3	(Brazil) Nelson Piquet Jr.	Jaguar	1:19.300	—N/a	5
7	36	(United Kingdom) Alex Lynn	Virgin-Citroën	1:19.447	—N/a	6
8	16	(United Kingdom) Oliver Turvey	NIO	1:19.574	—N/a	7
9	8	(France) Nico Prost	e.dams-Renault	1:19.623	—N/a	10^{2}
10	6	(Argentina) José María López	Dragon-Penske	1:19.662	—N/a	8
11	66	(Germany) Daniel Abt	Audi	1:19.726	—N/a	9
12	5	(Germany) Maro Engel	Venturi	1:19.877	—N/a	11
13	7	(Belgium) Jérôme d'Ambrosio	Dragon-Penske	1:19.923	—N/a	12
14	19	(Sweden) Felix Rosenqvist	Mahindra	1:19.984	—N/a	14
15	23	(Germany) Nick Heidfeld	Mahindra	1:20.012	—N/a	15
16	28	(Portugal) António Félix da Costa	Andretti-BMW	1:20.132	—N/a	16
17	4	(Switzerland) Edoardo Mortara	Venturi	1:20.157	—N/a	17
18	27	(United Kingdom) Tom Blomqvist	Andretti-BMW	1:20.422	—N/a	18
19	68	(Italy) Luca Filippi	NIO	1:31.271	—N/a	PL
20	20	(New Zealand) Mitch Evans	Jaguar	1:40.540	—N/a	20

Notes:

- ^1— Lucas Di Grassi was deducted ten grid places for changing his inverter.
- ^2— Nico Prost was deducted two grid places for exceeding the permitted number of laps during qualifying.

== Race ==
The 37-lap race began at 16:00 Chile Summer Time (UTC+03:00). The weather was hot and sunny and the air temperature ranged from 29.1 to 29.9 °C (84.4 to 85.8 °F) and the track temperature was between 36.1 and 36.67 °C (96.98 and 98.01 °F). A special feature of Formula E is the "Fan Boost" feature, an additional 100 kW (130 hp) of power to use in the driver's second car. The three drivers who were allowed to use the boost were determined by a fan vote. For the Santiago race, Buemi, di Grassi and López were handed the extra power. After his poor qualifying performance, NIO started Filippi from the pit lane for tactical reasons. Vergne led the field into the first corner. Piquet made a quick start to move from fifth to second and Vergne held him off. Lotterer overtook the slow-starting Buemi for third place, while a brisk start from López gained him three places. López attempted to overtake Bird on the outside at turn four; Bird put López into the tyre wall.

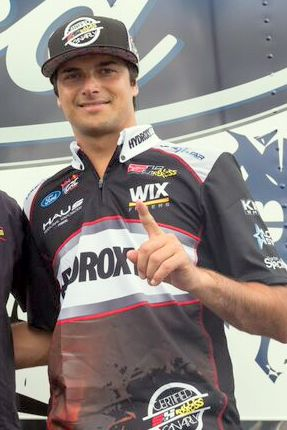
Nelson Piquet Jr. (pictured in 2015) ran second early on but settled for sixth after a driving error.

As drivers swerved to avoid piling into López's stricken car, Heidfeld hit Abt's rear wheel into turn four, causing both of their car's suspensions to fracture. Heidfeld made an unscheduled pit stop while Abt continued driving for a short period of time before doing the same. Engel drew alongside Turvey under braking for turn five and the pair made contact after Turvey braked later than him. Three corners later, Engel drew alongside Turvey on the outside and further contact was made at turn nine, breaking Engel's left-rear suspension. Engel became the race's second retiree when Rosenqvist lunged him on the outside into turn nine, putting him over to the exit and damaged the car's front-left corner, sending him into the right-hand side wall. These incidents prompted Elkins to deploy the safety car to allow marshals to move the cars off the circuit. All surviving vehicles were ordered to drive through the pit lane to prevent any impediment of the recovery work.

Amidst all the action, Rosenqvist moved from fourteenth to eleventh while Evans gained eight positions over the same distance in spite of a ten-second penalty for changing one of his car's inverters before the start of the race. The safety car was withdrawn after five laps and Vergne led the field back up to speed at the restart. Piquet was caught off guard, and Vergne distanced himself as Piquet fended off Lotterer and Buemi. Despite this, Piquet closed back up to Vergne. While attacking Vergne, Piquet ran into the rear of the latter's car, detaching its left-rear wheel guard. Piquet chose not to brake later than Vergne as he feared he would be put in the wall like in the 2017 Monaco ePrix. Hence the race began to stagnate as the few battle for positions on the circuit could not be completed due to the tight track. The fastest lap was exchanged between Vergne and Piquet later on as the latter started to form another challenge for the lead. However, Piquet was distanced by Vergne who was looking to extend his advantage at the front before the pit stops.

Further back, Abt joined the list of retirements when he drove into his garage because of a loss in power after completing seven laps. Although it was difficult to overtake owing to the tight nature of the circuit, overtaking opportunities occurred throughout the field. Lotterer made an attempt at getting ahead of Piquet for second place but he did not succeed. Di Grassi passed Turvey for eighth, while Mortara half spun on lap 13, dropping him to seventeenth. Di Grassi overtook Prost for seventh soon after. Lotterer steered left onto the inside and overtook Piquet for second place into the turn three right-hander on the 19th lap. The mandatory pit stops to change into a second car began on lap twenty when the leaders drove into the pit lane. Bird and Félix da Costa led the field for one lap before making their own stops. After the completion of the pit stops, the Techeetahs of Vergne and Lotterer retained first and second while Piquet kept third. Swift work from his pit crew moved Rosenqvist to fifth place while Bird fell to seventh.

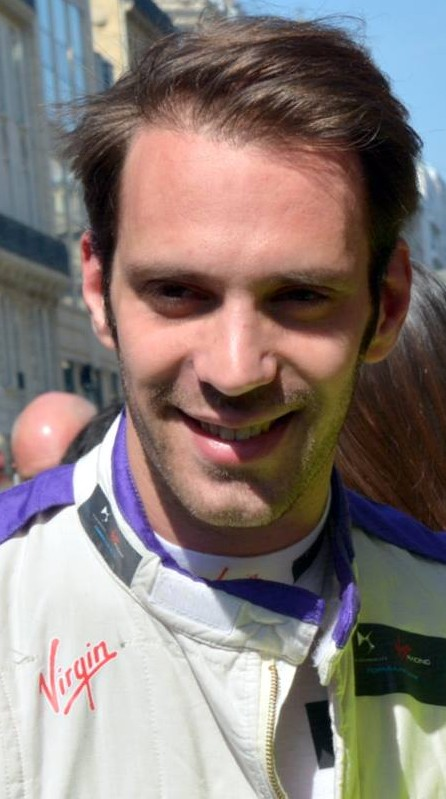
Jean-Éric Vergne (pictured in 2016) held off Lotterer's challenges in the race's final laps to take his second career victory.

Four cars were affected by problems over the next six laps. An electrical problem slowed di Grassi and he stopped in the centre of the track at the exit of the pit lane to retire on lap 23. Turvey lost power in his car leaving the pit lane and performed a full reset to continue driving. Heidfeld lacked electrical energy to complete the race in his second vehicle and parked inside his garage to retire on lap 26. A gearbox issue traced to an accessory production deviation ended Lynn's race early while in seventh two laps later. As the two Techeetahs began to battle for the lead due to both drivers losing radio communication with their garage owing to a pit lane technical failure and causing Vergne to conserve electrical energy, Buemi used his FanBoost to attack Piquet on lap 28 but the latter blocked the pass. Further round the lap, Buemi tried again, and was successful this time round, passing Piquet for third at the turn eight hairpin.

At the front on the following lap, Lotterer attempted to overtake teammate Vergne on the outside for the lead but was forced wide by the latter. A battle between Buemi and Piquet for third position ended when Piquet locked his brakes during a pass on Buemi on the inside into turn three and drove onto the run-off area. Piquet then lightly hit a TecPro barrier and fell to sixth. Bird set the race's fastest lap on the 30th lap, completing a circuit in 1 minute and 20.235 seconds, earning him one point. Meanwhile, Lotterer was focused on closing the distance between himself and teammate Vergne. Driving on the main straight on lap 33, Lotterer attacked Vergne and his attempt caused him to lock his tyres. Lotterer lodged his front nose cone into the rear wing of Vergne's car, pushing him through the braking phase for turn three. Both drivers made the corner without significant damage. This allowed Buemi, Rosenqvist and Bird to close up, and the top five jostled for position on the bumpy tarmac surface over the final four laps.

Buemi, Rosenqvist and Bird ran close together but electrical energy management restricted their attempts at overtaking, while Vergne successfully held off teammate Lotterer for the rest of the race by having more usable electrical energy to claim his second career victory. With Lotterer second, Techeetah secured the first one-two finish in Formula E history. Buemi took third to complete the final spot on the podium. Off the podium, Rosenqvist finished fourth with Bird close behind in fifth. The Jaguar duo of Piquet and Evans were sixth and seventh. d'Ambrosio, Félix da Costa and Prost rounded out the top ten. The final finishers were Blomqvist, Filippi, Mortara and Turvey. There was one lead change throughout the race and two drivers reached the front of the field. Vergne led for a total of 36 laps, out of 37.

=== Post-race ===
The top three drivers appeared on the podium to collect their trophies and spoke to the media in a later press conference. Vergne spoke of his relief over winning the race and said he hoped the success would strive his team to achieve more but noted the close competition that is seen in Formula E: "It would be wrong to focus at the championship at the moment because it is won at the end of the season, not now. [This competition] is extremely tough and you need to be on it every time because as soon as you make a small mistake you pay in cash." Lotterer was euphoric over finishing second after a poor start to his season due to misfortune, putting it down to additional set-up work undertaken by Techeetah in their simulator before the race, which led to an improved understanding on how his car worked. Third-place finisher Buemi revealed that a chassis defect reappeared from the season-opening Hong Kong double header led to him losing electrical energy and overall pace. He urged his team to focus on rectifying the issue but reserved congratulations for Techeetah on their achievement.

Techeetah and Dragon were placed under investigation by the stewards on the Saturday evening after the race for issues relating to their car's seat belts. Techeetah were issued with a €15,000 fine for each of their cars while Dragon were given the same penalty for d'Ambrosio's vehicle; the FIA mandated full payment within 48 hours. It came after the FIA deemed both teams to have modified the harness of the seat belts without consulting its technical delegate before they installed the extra components. However, unlike previous rulings in series history, the penalties did not alter the final result of the race. Reaction to the penalty was negative with several Formula E figures expressing anger over the FIA's inconsistency in its decision making and the message it sent out. Mark Preston, the team principal of Techeetah, suggested the wording of the FIA regulations was unclear and the sport's governing body responded by announcing it would clarify the rules before the Mexico City round. The motorsport press theorised the ruling was made after discord among fans and series figures was evident after Abt's disqualification from the victory in Hong Kong and spoke of their belief Techeetah's achievements possibly swayed the FIA into not disqualifying them.

Engel spoke of his displeasure over retiring on the first lap, accusing Turvey of causing the contact purposefully but stated his feeling Rosenqvist was ahead of him by the time he hit the wall. Turvey did not respond to Engel's accusations. Audi team principal Allan McNish said he was puzzled why Abt did not have the same unreliability as his teammate di Grassi and was uncertain whether it was the same problem from Marrakesh, "That's the frustrating part for us, for Lucas, and for the guys that put in so much effort from Marrakech until now. We thought we'd got a solution and we came away with no points." Di Grassi described the situation concerning the unreliability of his car as "unbelievable", adding that "To have so many issues consecutively, like that, it's really frustrating because we have the pace. The first thing in racing that you learn is to win a race, first you have to finish. We're not finishing any races." Concerning their collision at turn five on the first lap, Abt accepted an apology from Heidfeld on Twitter after Heidfeld admitted to causing it.

The result moved Vergne to the lead of the Drivers' Championship for the first time in his career with 71 points. Rosenqvist's fourth-place finish dropped him to second while Bird fell to third another five points behind Vergne. Buemi moved to fourth and Piquet dropped to fifth by finishing sixth. Techeetah's one-two finish promoted to the lead the Teams' Championship with 89 points, two ahead of Mahindra in second place. Virgin fell to third while Jaguar maintained fourth position. e.Dams-Renault's efforts moved them to fifth with eight races left in the season.

== Controversies ==
The route of the track was criticized by residents of Barrio Lastarria who argued the race would lead to the further impoverishment of the existing roadside infrastructure and the natural scenery. Claudio Orrego, the intendent of the Santiago Metropolitan Region, later admitted to the press the natural scenery would be left untouched and there would be no bleachers installed. Furthermore, a group of local residents filed an appeal for protection before the Court of Appeal to cancel the race but it was rejected on 31 January. On 20 February, the mayor of Santiago Felipe Alessandri announced Formula E could remain in the city but Parque Forestal was no longer authorised for racing.

Despite Orrego's promise, several residents reported that some cobblestones had been damaged in Purísima Street after the asphalt layer intended to protect from impoverishment was removed. Additionally, while the trackside structures were being dismantled, a truck collided with the Rebeca Matte Bello designed sculpture of Daedalus and Icarus mounted at the entrance to the Chilean National Museum of Fine Arts, moving it from its base and fracturing one of the statues's legs. This prompted race organisers to take responsibility for covering all expenses associated with the restoration of the sculpture.

== Race classification ==
Drivers who scored championship points are denoted in bold.

Final race classification
Pos.	No.	Driver	Team	Laps	Time/Retired	Grid	Points
1	**25**	(France) **Jean-Éric Vergne**	**Techeetah-Renault**	**37**	**1:01:24.514**	**1**	**25+3**^{3}
2	**18**	(Germany) **André Lotterer**	**Techeetah-Renault**	**37**	**+1.154**	**3**	**18**
3	**9**	(Switzerland) **Sébastien Buemi**	**e.Dams-Renault**	**37**	**+1.959**	**2**	**15**
4	**19**	(Sweden) **Felix Rosenqvist**	**Mahindra**	**37**	**+2.793**	**14**	**12**
5	**2**	(United Kingdom) **Sam Bird**	**Virgin-Citroën**	**37**	**+4.490**	**4**	**10+1**^{4}
6	**3**	(Brazil) **Nelson Piquet Jr.**	**Jaguar**	**37**	**+6.364**	**5**	**8**
7	**20**	(New Zealand) **Mitch Evans**	**Jaguar**	**37**	**+7.099**	**20**	**6**
8	**7**	(Belgium) **Jérôme d'Ambrosio**	**Dragon-Penske**	**37**	**+13.308**	**12**	**4**
9	**28**	(Portugal) **António Félix da Costa**	**Andretti-BMW**	**37**	**+14.811**	**16**	**2**
10	**8**	(France) **Nico Prost**	**e.Dams-Renault**	**37**	**+21.092**	**10**	**1**
11	27	(United Kingdom) Tom Blomqvist	Andretti-BMW	37	+32.924	18	—
12	68	(Italy) Luca Filippi	NIO	37	+44.127	PL	—
13	4	(Switzerland) Edoardo Mortara	Venturi	37	+49.398	17	—
14	16	(United Kingdom) Oliver Turvey	NIO	37	+1:12.282	7	—
Ret	36	(United Kingdom) Alex Lynn	Virgin-Citroën	26	Gearbox	6	—
Ret	23	(Germany) Nick Heidfeld	Mahindra	23	Energy	15	—
Ret	1	(Brazil) Lucas di Grassi	Audi	21	Power	13	—
Ret	66	(Germany) Daniel Abt	Audi	11	Energy	9	—
Ret	6	(Argentina) José María López	Dragon-Penske	0	Accident	8	—
Ret	5	(Germany) Maro Engel	Venturi	0	Accident	11	—

Notes:

- **^3** — Three points for pole position.
- **^4** — One point for fastest lap.

== Standings after the race ==
Drivers' Championship standings

+/–	Pos	Driver	Points
2	1	(France) Jean-Éric Vergne	71
1	2	(Sweden) Felix Rosenqvist	66 (−5)
1	3	(United Kingdom) Sam Bird	61 (−10)
2	4	(Switzerland) Sébastien Buemi	37 (−34)
1	5	(Brazil) Nelson Piquet Jr.	33 (−38)

Teams' Championship standings

+/–	Pos	Constructor	Points
2	1	(China) Techeetah-Renault	89
1	2	(India) Mahindra	87 (−2)
1	3	(United Kingdom) Virgin-Citroën	69 (−30)
	4	(United Kingdom) Jaguar	54 (−45)
1	5	(France) e.Dams-Renault	44 (−55)

- Notes: Only the top five positions are included for both sets of standings.

Previous race: 2018 Marrakesh ePrix	FIA Formula E Championship; 2017–18 season	Next race: 2018 Mexico City ePrix
Previous race: N/A	Santiago ePrix	Next race: 2019 Santiago ePrix
