= Maximilian Günther =

German-Austrian racing driver (born 1997)

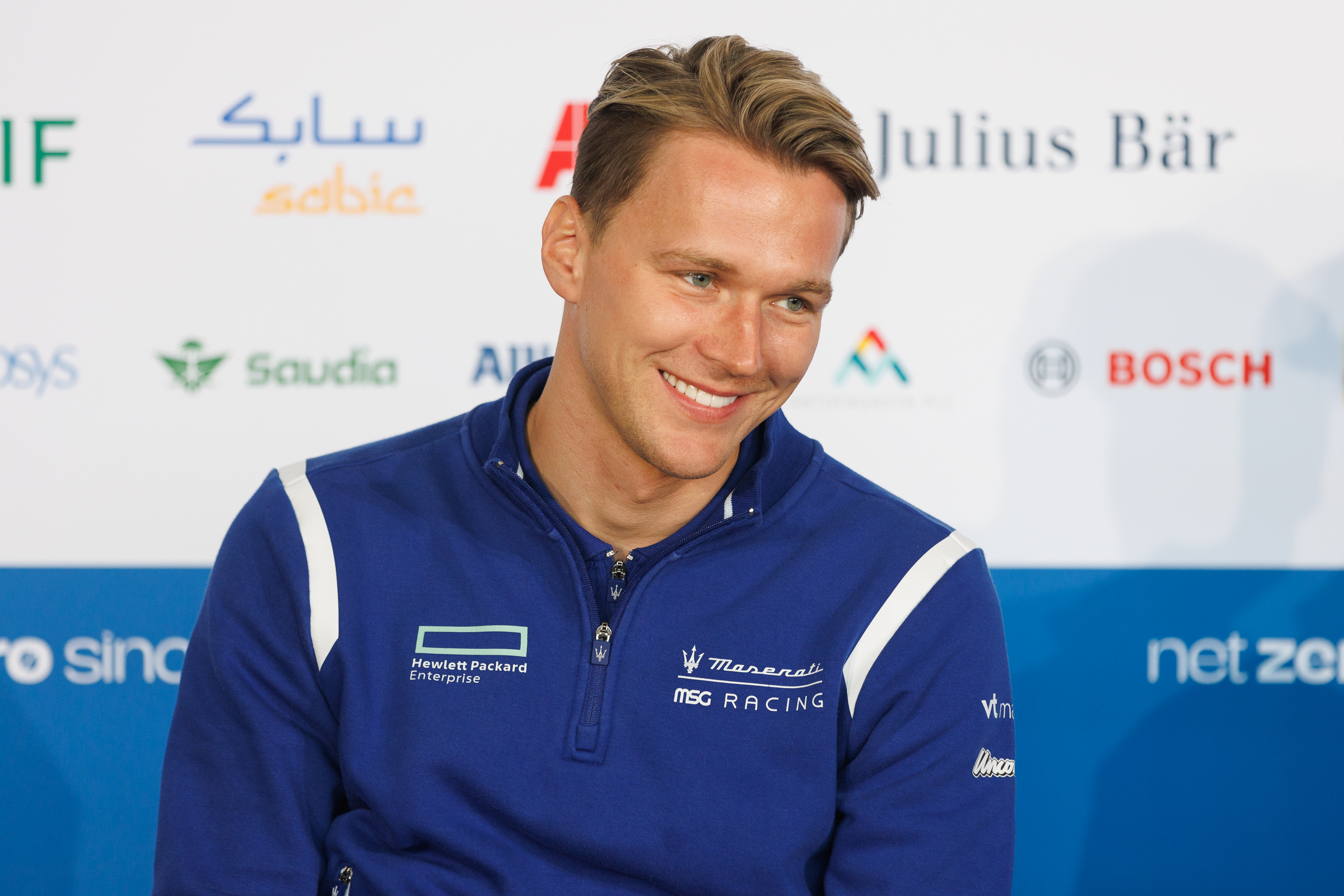
- Günther in 2024
- Nationality: (Germany) German
- Born: 2 July 1997 (age 29) Oberstdorf, Germany

FIA Formula E Championship career
- Debut season: 2018–19
- Current team: Envision Racing
- Categorisation: FIA Platinum
- Car number: 7
- Former teams: GEOX Dragon, BMW i Andretti, Nissan, Maserati, DS Penske
- Starts: 104
- Wins: 7
- Podiums: 12
- Poles: 4
- Fastest laps: 1
- Best finish: 7th in 2022–23
- Finished last season: 18th (23 pts)

Previous series
- 2018 2015–17 2013–14 2011: FIA Formula 2 FIA F3 European; ADAC Formel Masters; Formula BMW

Maximilian "Max" Günther (born 2 July 1997) is a German racing driver who is set to compete in Formula E with Envision Racing.

Günther has previously driven for BWT Arden in Formula 2. He has driven for Dragon Racing, BMW i Andretti, Nissan, Maserati and DS Penske in Formula E. He has achieved seven victories in Formula E, the first one coming at the 2020 Santiago ePrix.

== Junior racing career ==
=== Karting ===
Born in Oberstdorf, Günther began his racing career in karting in 2007. He did not win any titles, but he placed second in the 2007 ADAC Kart Masters and the Southern German ADAC Kart Cup. Günther remained in karting until 2010.

=== Lower formulae ===
==== 2011 ====
In 2011, Günther competed in open-wheel racing, in Formula BMW Talent Cup. He took only one win throughout the campaign at the Algarve International Circuit, which placed him runner-up in the standings to the dominant Stefan Wackerbauer, the only other race winner of the season.

==== 2013 ====
After not racing in 2012, Günther competed in the ADAC Formel Masters in 2013 for ADAC Berlin-Brandenburg e.V.. He was consistent throughout the first half of the season, managing multiple podiums as he put up a title charge. He then secured his first victories at the Lausitzring, which proved to be his only ones of the season. He finished the season second in the standings, with 240 points as well as nine other podiums.

==== 2014 ====
Günther remained in the ADAC Formel Masters for 2014. He took three wins in the opening three rounds, However, he would go winless during the next three rounds as eventual champion Mikkel Jensen racked up five wins to build a sizeable lead. He earned one more win at the Sachsenring, meaning Günther would finish runner-up for the successive season, this time scoring two more wins but one less podium.

=== FIA Formula 3 European Championship ===
==== 2015 ====
In 2015, Günther stepped up to the FIA Formula 3 European Championship with Mücke Motorsport. He scored points in his first race in Silverstone with ninth place, before taking his first podium during the third round at the Pau Grand Prix. After more regular points finishes, Günther finally claimed his maiden victory at the Norisring. However, after finishing seventh place during the second Zandvoort race, he failed to score points in the next two rounds. Ahead of the Nürburgring round, Günther parted ways with Mücke Motorsport, causing him to miss the aforementioned round. However, he would join Prema Powerteam for the Hockenheim season finale, in which he finished in the points in all three races. Despite missing one round, he finished his rookie Formula 3 season eighth in the standings, with 152 points.

==== 2016 ====
Günther would remain with Prema Powerteam for the 2016 FIA Formula 3 European Championship. He took a double pole position for the Paul Ricard opener, before winning the final race despite a last lap clash with teammate Nick Cassidy. The second round in Monza was a mirror of Paul Ricard, as Günther again won whilst scoring a double pole, allowing him to take the championship lead. Over the next three rounds, Günther manage three third-places, as his title rival Lance Stroll snatched the standings lead with a handful of wins. He would win once again at Zandvoort from pole. Despite a fourth and final win at the Nürburgring, he would be 68 points behind leader Stroll with two rounds remaining. After dropping out of contention by failing to score in Imola, a podium in the Hockenheim season finale secured him as runner-up for the season, having taken four wins, thirteen podiums and 320 points.

At the end of the season, Günther raced in his debut Macau Grand Prix with Prema, which went unrewarded as a broken suspension following contact with a rival forced him to retire.

==== 2017 ====
Günther continued in the FIA Formula 3 European Championship for 2017, once again for Prema Powerteam alongside Callum Ilott, Guanyu Zhou and Mick Schumacher. He took two podiums in the opening two rounds, but opened his account with two wins at the Pau Grand Prix. He followed this up with another win the next round at the Hungaroring during the first race. Another win, which included a triple podium at the Norisring saw him take the championship lead. Despite collecting more podiums following that, Günther only won again during the final race of the season in Hockenheim, by then he had dropped out of title contention as eventual champion Lando Norris sealed six more wins. Despite a more successful season than in 2016, with five wins, sixteen podiums and 383 points, Günther finished third in the drivers' standings, missing out on runner-up to Joel Eriksson by five points.

Günther returned to the Macau Grand Prix with Prema. He had a strong performance, finishing fifth in the main race.

=== FIA Formula 2 Championship ===
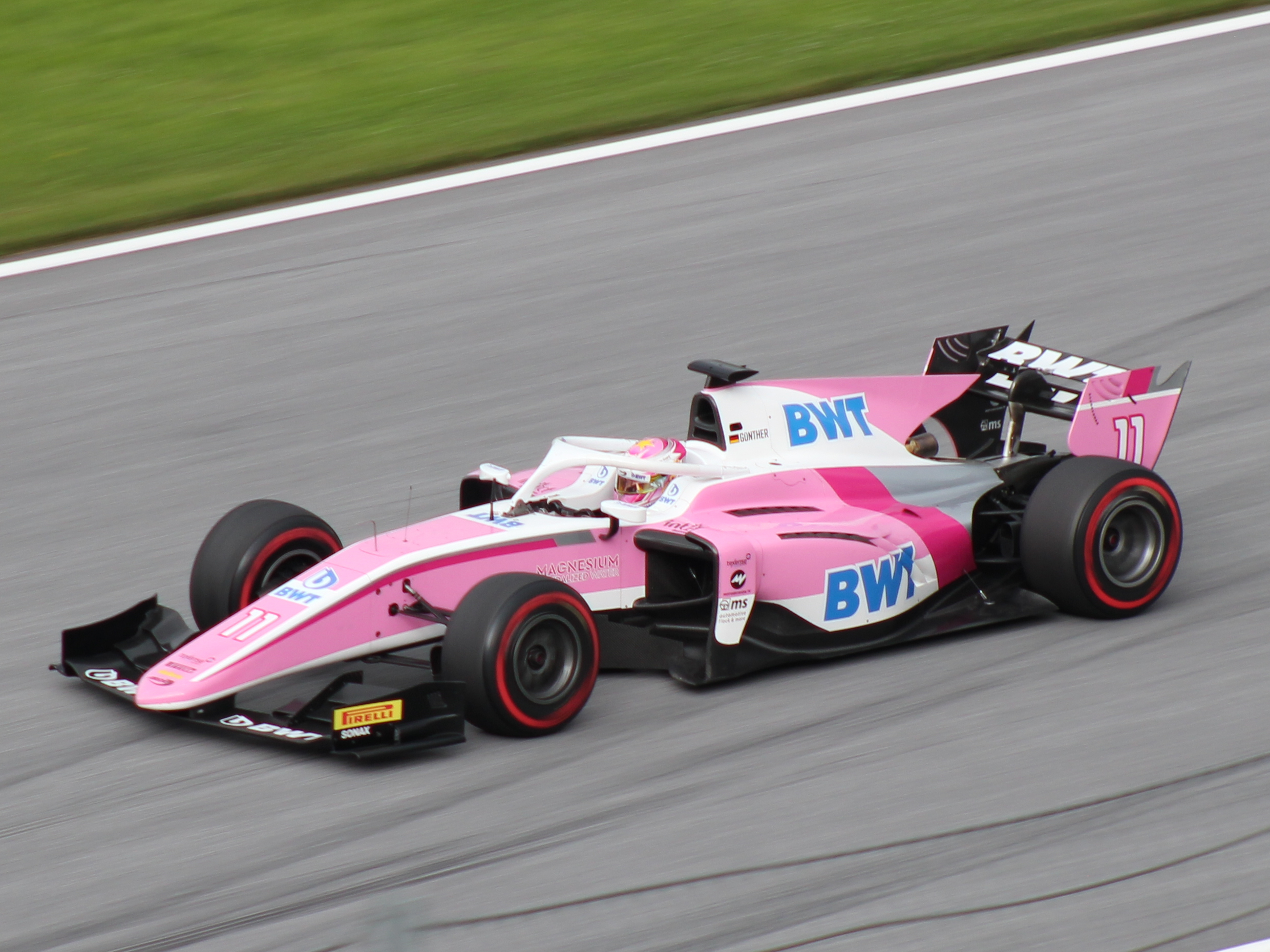
Günther driving for BWT Arden during the 2018 Spielberg Formula 2 round

Günther graduated to Formula 2 in 2018 with BWT Arden partnering Nirei Fukuzumi, who graduated from GP3. He had an impressive start to the season in Bahrain, scoring points with ninth place in the feature race before taking his maiden podium during the sprint race. He would then have to wait until the fourth round in Monaco to score points again, in which he finished sixth in the sprint race. Günther would take his first Formula 2 win during the Silverstone sprint race, having controlled the lead from reverse pole. He finished ninth for the Spa-Francorchamps feature race, which proved to be his final points finish of the campaign.

After signing with GEOX Dragon in Formula E, Günther vacated his seat at BWT Arden for the Yas Marina season finale and was replaced by Red Bull junior driver Dan Ticktum. He finished 14th in the championship standings, with 41 points.

== Formula E ==
=== Reserve driver (2018) ===
In January 2018, Günther made his Formula E debut with Dragon Racing during the Marrakesh rookie test. He was later appointed as the test and reserve driver for the team during the 2017–18 Formula E season.

=== Dragon (2018–2019) ===
==== 2018–19 season ====
After Jerome d'Ambrosio departed the team to move to Mahindra Racing, Günther was promoted to a race seat and made his debut in the 2018 Ad Diriyah ePrix. Following three races where he achieved a best finish of 12th, he was replaced by Felipe Nasr after the Santiago ePrix. Despite this, Günther returned to the team for the Rome ePrix, to complete the season with them. He scored his first points in Formula E with a fifth place finish at the Paris ePrix. He would finish in fifth place again at the Swiss ePrix, meaning that he finished his rookie season 17th in the Drivers' Championship with 20 points.

=== BMW i Andretti Motorsport (2019–2021) ===
==== 2019–20 season ====
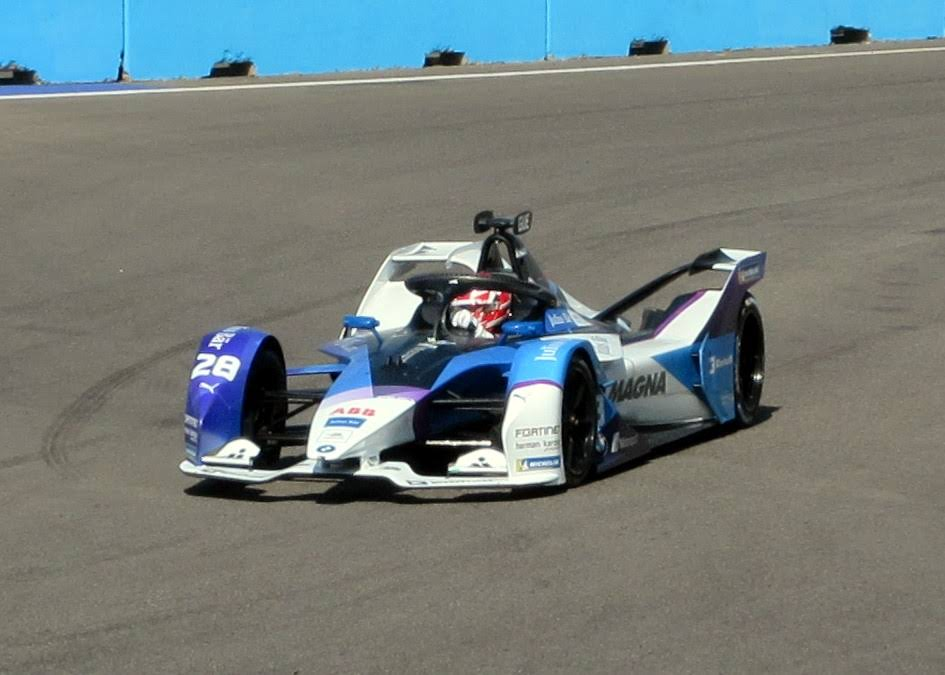
Günther driving for BMW i Andretti Motorsport at the 2020 Marrakesh ePrix

For the 2019–20 season, Günther was signed to race for BMW i Andretti Motorsport to replace Antonio Felix da Costa after he moved to reigning champion team DS Techeetah. The second race of the season in Diriyah saw Günther take a maiden podium in second place behind teammate Alexander Sims, but was demoted to 11th after passing Lucas di Grassi under safety car conditions. At the next race in Santiago, Günther claimed his maiden Formula E victory after a last lap pass on da Costa, becoming the youngest Formula E winner in the progress at just 22 years old. After finishing 11th at the Mexico City ePrix, Günther returned to the podium at the Marrakesh ePrix as he finished second after starting in the same position. During the first race at the Berlin ePrix, Günther was set to score points with eighth place after good energy management, but was disqualified for exceeding the energy limit. Despite that, he would win the third Berlin race after starting second, which included a battle for the lead with Jean-Éric Vergne. He would not score points again for the final three races courtesy of two retirements, Günther finished ninth in the standings with 69 points, with his three points finishes being all podium finishes.

==== 2020–21 season ====
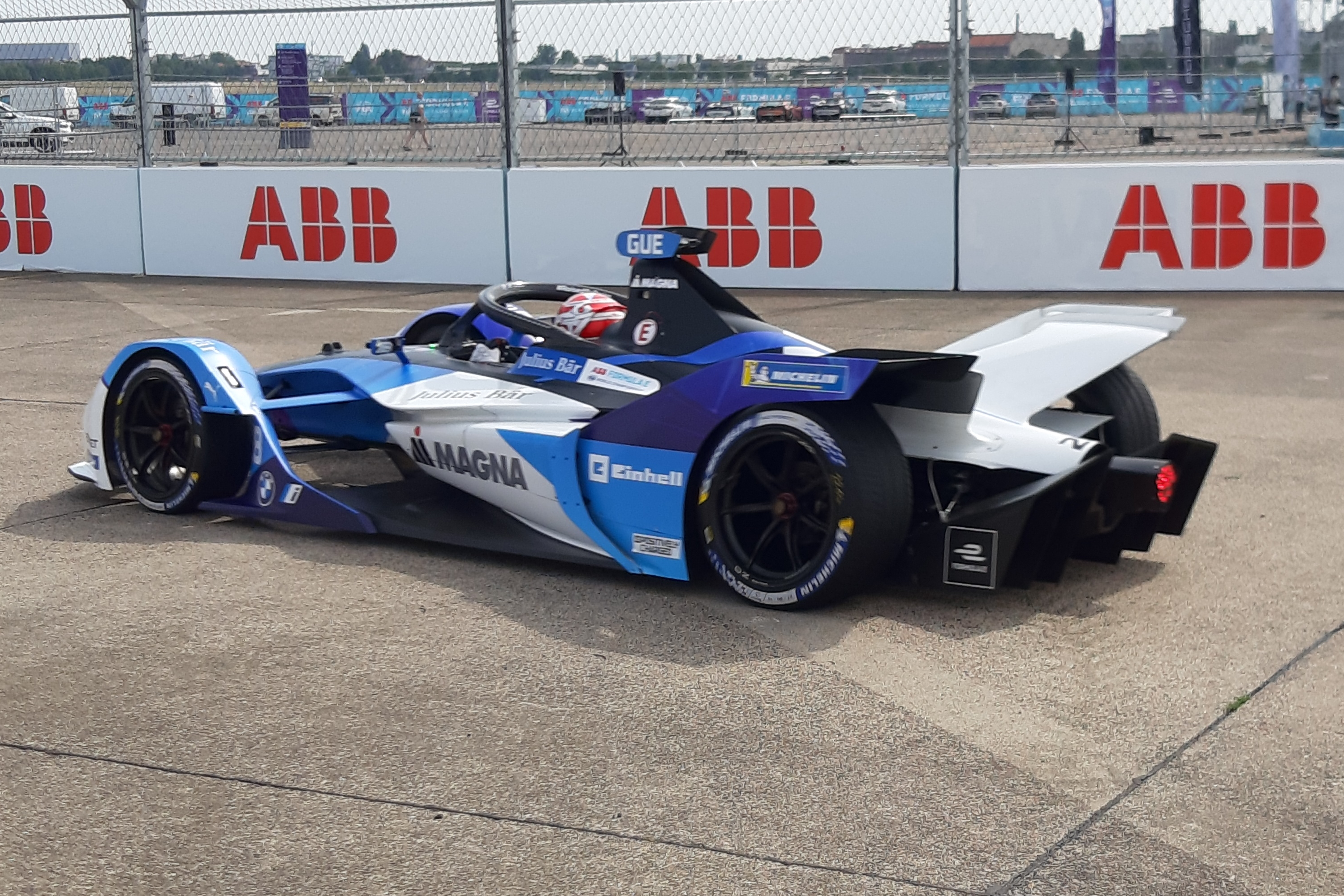
Günther at the 2021 Berlin ePrix

Günther was retained by BMW i Andretti Motorsport for the 2020–21 season, partnering Jake Dennis. He endured a double retirement during the Diriyah ePrix, but earned his first points of the year with ninth and fifth place the next round in Rome ePrix. Günther secured his first front row start for the first race at the Rome ePrix, but took himself out of the race after sliding and beaching himself into the gravel. A strong race in Monaco meant he collected another fifth place finish. Günther took his sole win of the season the New York City ePrix, taking advantage of a late-race collision between Jean-Éric Vergne and Nick Cassidy. He would finish in tenth place the following day during the second race. Two more points finishes, came with sixth place in London and eighth at the Berlin ePrix. In a tight championship, Günther finished 16th in the championship with 66 points, albeit only 33 off the champion.

=== Nissan e.dams (2022) ===
==== 2021–22 season ====
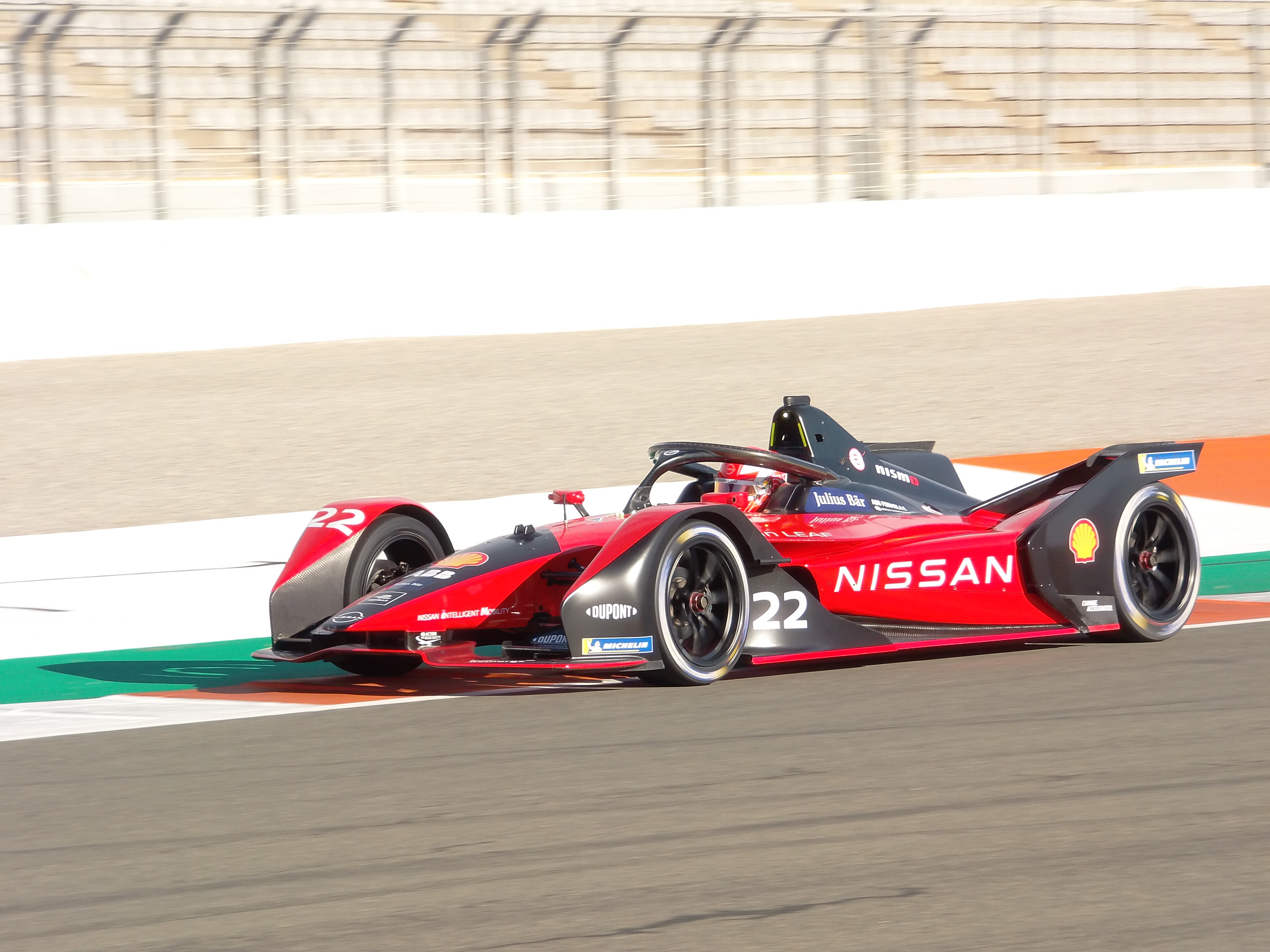
Günther with Nissan e.dams during the pre-season testing

Günther moved to Nissan e.dams for the 2021–22 season, where he partnered 2015–16 Formula E champion Sébastien Buemi. His first points for the team at the Mexico City ePrix would prove to be a red herring, as the German struggled to finish close to teammate Sébastien Buemi throughout the races. At the Monaco ePrix, Günther ran in eighth place for most of the race, but ran out of energy and dropped to 17th place. The second and final top-ten finish of his campaign would come at the London ePrix, during a weekend where a collision with Nick Cassidy earned Günther critical comments from the New Zealander. Günther ended the season 19th in the standings, having scored just six points throughout the season.

=== Maserati MSG Racing (2023–2024) ===
==== 2022–23 season ====
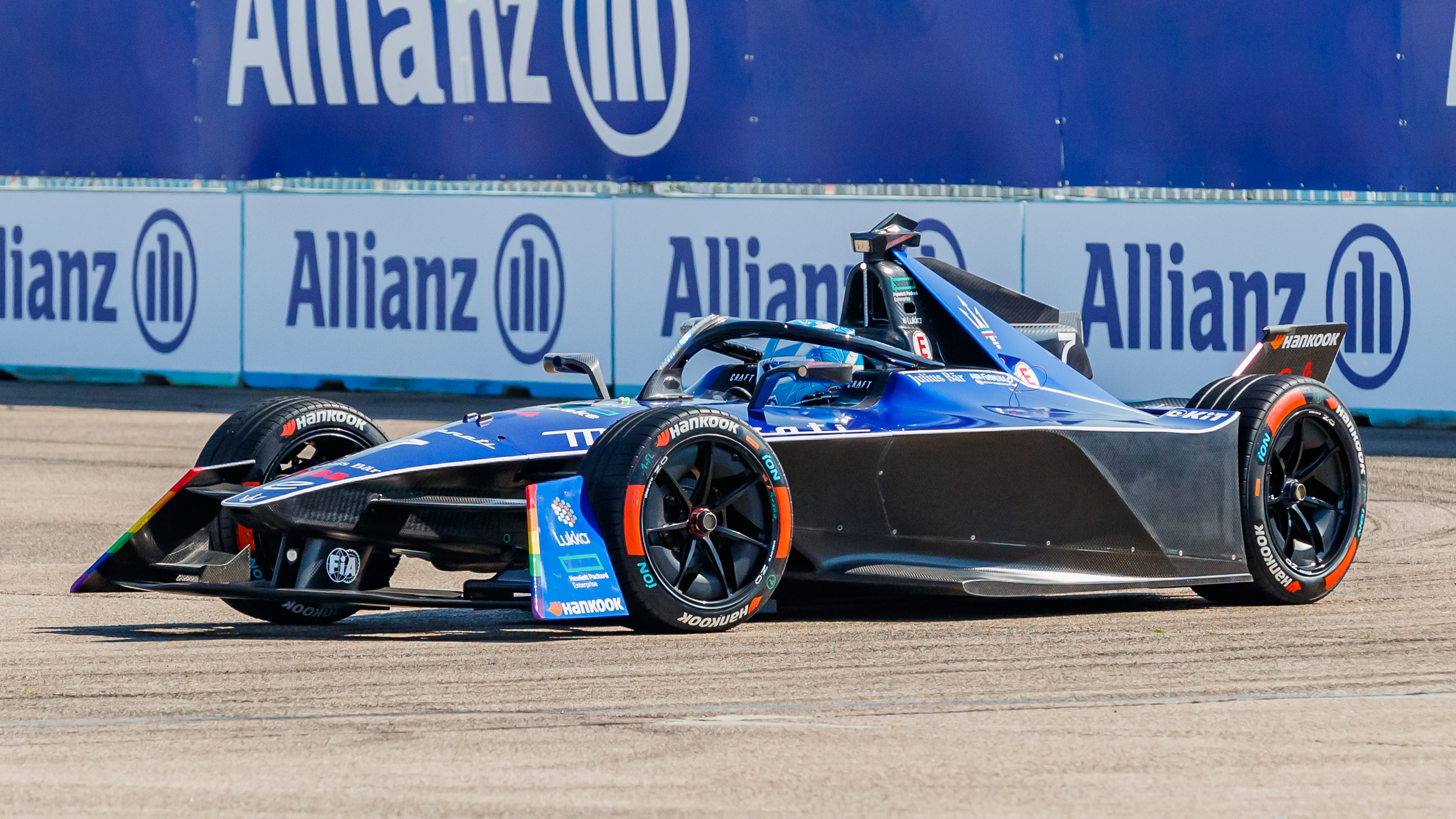
Günther with Maserati MSG Racing at the 2023 Berlin ePrix

Günther switched to Maserati MSG Racing for the 2022–23 season, partnering Edoardo Mortara in a seat vacated by Nyck de Vries' decision to switch to the AlphaTauri team in F1. His campaign started out disappointingly, as an eleventh place in Mexico City was followed by a crash in qualifying for the first race in Diriyah, after which the car could not be repaired in time for the race. He qualified fifth at the Hyderabad ePrix after he was boxed in by the colliding two Jaguar cars. More disappointment followed in Cape Town as he crashed out of the race on lap 21 after starting second. He finally broke his points duck during the first race at the Berlin ePrix, where a last-corner overtake on Sébastien Buemi earned him a place on the rostrum. He finished sixth the following day having started from 21st, before retiring at Monaco as a result of a collision with Dan Ticktum.

In Jakarta, the German experienced his best Formula E weekend to date, scoring his maiden pole for both races, finishing third on Saturday ahead of a dominant win on Sunday; Maserati's first in single-seater competition since the 1957 German Grand Prix. At the Portland ePrix, Günther was once again in podium contention until he got forced off track by Sam Bird, dropping him to sixth at the flag. Günther scored another third-placed podium during the first race of the Rome ePrix after good energy management; he would finish in sixth place the following day. He had a difficult end to the season in London as he placed below points in both races. Günther finished the season seventh in the drivers' standings with 101 points, one win, two poles and four podiums, his best Formula E campaign to date.

==== 2023–24 season ====
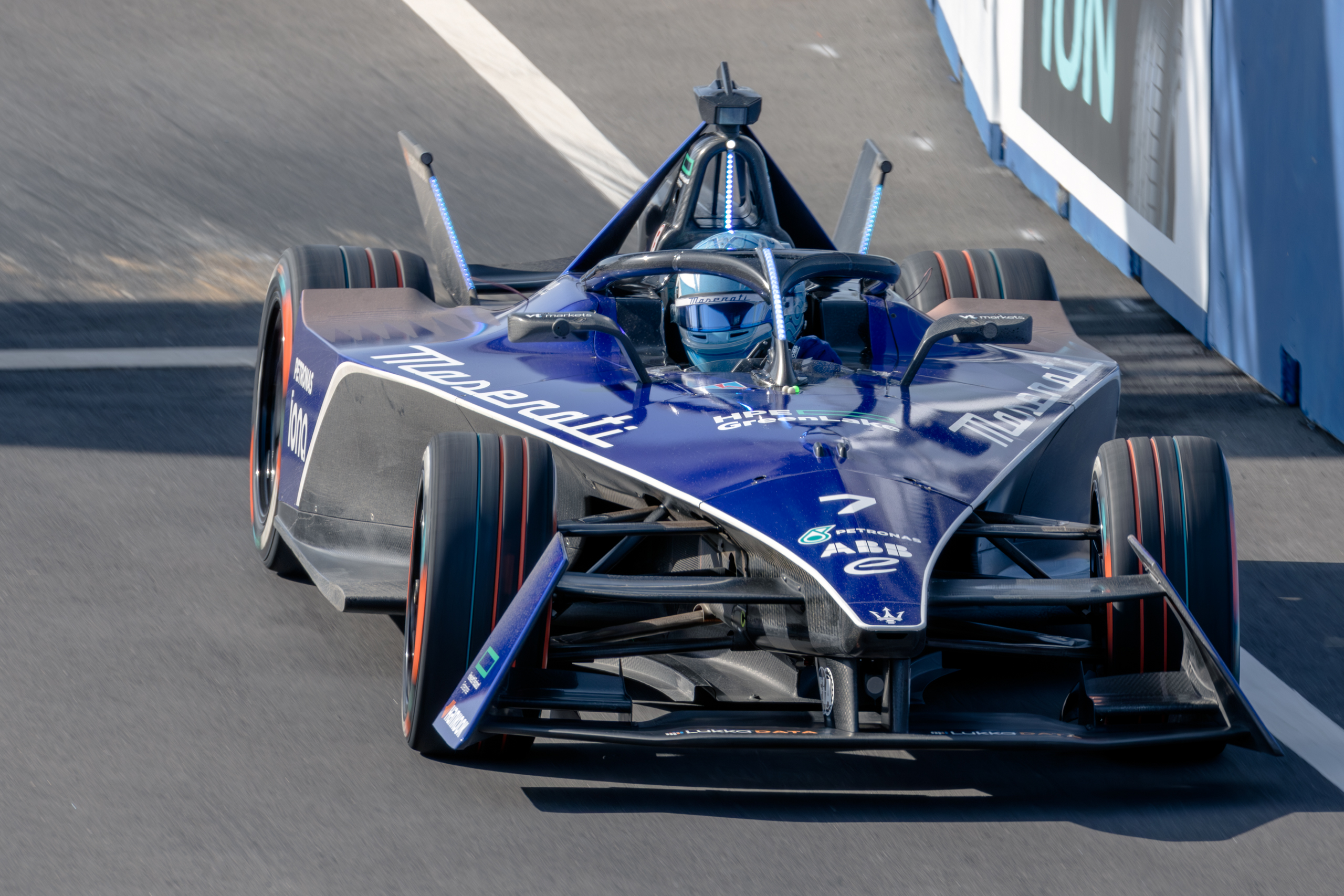
Günther at the 2024 Tokyo ePrix

Günther remained with Maserati MSG Racing for the 2023–24 season alongside a new teammate, Formula 2 driver Jehan Daruvala who replaces Edoardo Mortara who went over to Mahindra. He started the season with a strong fourth place at the Mexico City ePrix, and scored more points at the Diriyah ePrix with seventh and ninth, setting him off to a great start. At the São Paulo ePrix, Günther recovered from a 40-place grid penalty from changing engine parts as well as an early ten second stop-go penalty to finish in ninth place. Starting on the front row for the 2024 Tokyo ePrix, he was engaged in a battle for the lead with Oliver Rowland, but Günther emerged victorious to secure his first win of the season. He scored a third place podium during the first race of the Misano ePrix, being promoted to the rostrum post-race after winner António Félix da Costa was disqualified. The following day however, Günther recorded his first non-points finish of the season as a post-race penalty demoted him from ninth to 12th place.

The second half of the season would prove to be more difficult for Günther, as a ninth place in Monaco was followed by a double retirement in his home Berlin ePrix. He took two more eighth places in Shanghai and Portland, before suffering another double retirement in the London season finale; a technical issue causing him to retire from second place in the first race. He finished the season eighth in the standings with 81 points, having scored one win and two podiums. After two successful seasons with the team, Günther departed Maserati at the end of the season.

=== DS Penske (2024–2026) ===
==== 2024–25 season ====
Günther moved to DS Penske for the 2024–25 season, partnering Jean-Éric Vergne and replacing Maserati-bound Stoffel Vandoorne. After finishing 11th in São Paulo, Günther scored his first points of the campaign with a sixth place in Mexico City. Günther then took pole for Formula E's maiden pit boost race at Jeddah, which he went on to win following a last-lap overtake on Oliver Rowland. The following day, Günther missed his braking point on lap 1 and crashed into António Félix da Costa, causing both drivers to retire from race 2. As a result, Günther received a five-place grid penalty for the next race in Miami. There, Günther was involved in a multi-car pileup and finished 17th. Günther scored points in both Monaco races, finishing tenth on Saturday and eighth on Sunday. In Tokyo, Günther retired from race 1 because of an electrical issue, before finishing 10th in race 2.

At the Shanghai ePrix, Günther claimed pole position for race 1. During the race, he saved his second attack mode activation until the closing laps, where he was able to move past Rowland to achieve a controlling victory. Günther retired from race 2 with a technical issue, and failed to finish the Jakarta ePrix due to a collision caused by Rowland. Günther returned to the points with sixth in race 1 at Berlin, where he ran as high as second before a safety car restart. Power loss prevented Günther from finishing race 2. He also retired from race 1 in London, having suffered a lap 1 collision with Edoardo Mortara after starting from sixth place. Having started second in race 2, Günther ended the season by finishing seventh. He placed tenth in the drivers' championship, 13 points and four places behind teammate Vergne.

==== 2025–26 season ====
For the 2025–26 season, Günther remained at DS Penske and was joined by new teammate Taylor Barnard.

Günther exited DS Penske at the end of the season.

=== Envision Racing (2027–) ===
==== 2026–27 season ====
Günther joined Envision Racing for the 2026–27 season on a multi-year deal, racing with the team into the Gen4 era.

== Other racing ==
=== DTM ===
At the end of 2016, Günther partook in the DTM Young Driver Test at Jerez where he tested the Mercedes-AMG C63 DTM car with Mercedes. Soon after, he was announced as the test and reserve driver for Mercedes for the 2017 season. He completed a test programme with the team in October, where it took place at the Lausitzring.

=== Super Formula ===
In December 2017, Günther took part in a Super Formula test with Team LeMans at the Suzuka Circuit.

=== FIA World Endurance Championship ===
In 2022, Günther drove an endurance racing car for the first time, driving the Peugeot 9X8 Le Mans Hypercar during the post-season test at the Bahrain International Circuit. He stated that it was "fantastic" and that he was "grateful for the experience".

== Personal life ==
Günther currently resides in Monaco. He holds dual German and Austrian nationality.

In addition to his native German, Günther also speaks English, French, and Spanish.

== Racing record ==
=== Karting career summary ===
Season	Series	Team	Position
2007	Southern German ADAC Kart Cup — Bambini A	Ebert Motorsport	**2nd**
2007	ADAC Kart Masters — Bambini A	Ebert Motorsport	**2nd**
2008	ADAC Kart Masters — Bambini A	Ebert Motorsport	7th
2009	ADAC Kart Masters — Bambini A	Valier Racing	11th
2010	ADAC Kart Masters — KF3		**1st**
2010	Werner-Grossevollmer-Memory-Trophy	RS Motorsport	10th
2010	German Karting Championship — Junior	RS Motorsport	6th
2010	Monaco Kart Cup — KF3	RS Motorsport	16th

=== Racing career summary ===
Season	Series	Team	Races	Wins	Poles	F/Laps	Podiums	Points	Position
2011	Formula BMW Talent Cup	BMW Motorsport	17	2	0	2	14	?	**2nd**
2013	ADAC Formel Masters	ADAC Berlin-Brandenburg e.V.	24	2	8	2	11	240	**2nd**
2014	ADAC Formel Masters	ADAC Berlin-Brandenburg e.V.	24	4	5	4	10	262	**2nd**
2015	FIA Formula 3 European Championship	Mücke Motorsport	27	1	0	0	2	150	8th
2015	FIA Formula 3 European Championship	Prema Powerteam	3	0	0	0	0	150	8th
2016	FIA Formula 3 European Championship	Prema Powerteam	30	4	7	4	13	320	**2nd**
2016	Macau Grand Prix	Prema Powerteam	1	0	0	0	0	N/A	DNF
2016	Formula One	Mercedes AMG Petronas F1 Team	Simulator driver						
2017	FIA Formula 3 European Championship	Prema Powerteam	30	5	3	2	16	383	**3rd**
2017	Macau Grand Prix	Theodore Racing by Prema	1	0	0	0	0	N/A	5th
2017	Formula One	Mercedes AMG Petronas Motorsport	Simulator driver						
2018	FIA Formula 2 Championship	BWT Arden	22	1	0	0	2	41	14th
2018–19	Formula E	GEOX Dragon	10	0	0	0	0	20	17th
2019–20	Formula E	BMW i Andretti Motorsport	11	2	0	0	3	69	9th
2020–21	Formula E	BMW i Andretti Motorsport	15	1	0	0	1	66	16th
2021–22	Formula E	Nissan e.dams	16	0	0	0	0	6	19th
2022–23	Formula E	Maserati MSG Racing	16	1	2	0	4	101	7th
2023–24	Formula E	Maserati MSG Racing	16	1	0	0	2	73	8th
2024–25	Formula E	DS Penske	16	2	2	1	2	85	10th
2025–26	Formula E	DS Penske	17	0	0	1	0	23	18th
2026–27	Formula E	PaySafe Envision Racing	0	0	0	0	0	0	TBD

=== Complete ADAC Formel Masters results ===
(key) (Races in bold indicate pole position) (Races in italics indicate fastest lap)

Year	Team	1	2	3	4	5	6	7	8	9	10	11	12	13	14	15	16	17	18	19	20	21	22	23	24	DC	Points
2013	ADAC Berlin-Brandenburg e.V.	OSC; 1; 5	OSC; 2; 3	OSC; 3; 5	SPA; 1; 3	SPA; 2; 3	SPA; 3; 6	SAC; 1; 2	SAC; 2; 16	SAC; 3; 13	**NÜR**; **1**; 3	**NÜR**; **2**; 2	NÜR; 3; 4	**RBR**; **1**; 4	**RBR**; **2**; 2	RBR; 3; 3	**LAU**; **1**; 1	**LAU**; **2**; 1	LAU; 3; 7	SVK; 1 Ret	SVK; 2 Ret	SVK; 3; 7	**HOC**; **1**; 2	**HOC**; **2** Ret	HOC; 3; 9	2nd	240
2014	ADAC Berlin-Brandenburg e.V.	OSC; 1; 2	**OSC**; **2**; 1	OSC; 3; 8	ZAN; 1 Ret	**ZAN**; **2**; 1	ZAN; 3; 10	LAU; 1; 1	LAU; 2; 2	LAU; 3; 5	RBR; 1; 5	RBR; 2; 2	RBR; 3; 4	SVK; 1 Ret	SVK; 2; 4	SVK; 3; 7	NÜR; 1; 7	NÜR; 2; 3	NÜR; 3; 3	SAC; 1; 5	SAC; 2; 8	SAC; 3; 1	**HOC**; **1**; 2	**HOC**; **2**; 4	HOC; 3; 9	2nd	262

=== Complete FIA Formula 3 European Championship results ===
(key) (Races in bold indicate pole position) (Races in italics indicate fastest lap)

Year	Entrant	Engine	1	2	3	4	5	6	7	8	9	10	11	12	13	14	15	16	17	18	19	20	21	22	23	24	25	26	27	28	29	30	31	32	33	DC	Points
2015	kfzteile24 Mücke Motorsport	Mercedes	SIL; 1; 9	SIL; 2; 12	SIL; 3; 21	HOC; 1; 5	HOC; 2; 4	HOC; 3; 5	PAU; 1; 4	PAU; 2; 18	PAU; 3; 2	MNZ; 1 Ret	MNZ; 2 Ret	MNZ; 3; 10	SPA; 1; 13	SPA; 2; 7	SPA; 3; 8	NOR; 1; 4	NOR; 2; 1	NOR; 3 Ret	ZAN; 1; 29	ZAN; 2; 7	ZAN; 3; 12	RBR; 1; 20	RBR; 2; 14	RBR; 3; 19	ALG; 1; 14	ALG; 2; 14	ALG; 3 Ret	NÜR; 1	NÜR; 2	NÜR; 3				8th	150
2015	Prema Powerteam	Mercedes																															HOC; 1; 4	HOC; 2; 4	HOC; 3; 6	8th	150
2016	Prema Powerteam	Mercedes	LEC; 1; 5	**LEC**; **2** Ret	**LEC**; **3**; 1	**HUN**; **1**; 5	**HUN**; **2**; 1	**HUN**; **3** Ret	PAU; 1; 3	PAU; 2; 14	PAU; 3; 13	RBR; 1; 3	RBR; 2; 6	RBR; 3; 3	NOR; 1 Ret	NOR; 2; 3	NOR; 3; 5	ZAN; 1; 4	ZAN; 2; 2	**ZAN**; **3**; 1	SPA; 1; 2	SPA; 2; 7	SPA; 3; 6	NÜR; 1; 2	NÜR; 2; 2	**NÜR**; **3**; 1	IMO; 1; 12	IMO; 2 Ret	IMO; 3; 12	HOC; 1; 2	HOC; 2; 8	HOC; 3; 9				2nd	320
2017	Prema Powerteam	Mercedes	SIL; 1; 3	SIL; 2; 4	SIL; 3; 4	MNZ; 1; 7	MNZ; 2; 4	MNZ; 3; 3	PAU; 1; 3	PAU; 2; 1	PAU; 3; 1	**HUN**; **1**; 1	HUN; 2; 6	HUN; 3; 6	NOR; 1; 1	NOR; 2; 3	**NOR**; **3**; 2	SPA; 1; 3	SPA; 2; 3	SPA; 3 Ret	ZAN; 1; 3	ZAN; 2; 7	ZAN; 3; 3	NÜR; 1; 12	NÜR; 2; 13	NÜR; 3; 7	RBR; 1; 3	RBR; 2; 7	RBR; 3; 5	HOC; 1; 10	HOC; 2; 2	**HOC**; **3**; 1				3rd	383

=== Complete Macau Grand Prix results ===
Year	Team	Car	Qualifying	Quali Race	Main race
2016	(Italy) Prema Powerteam	Dallara F312	7th	DNF	DNF
2017	(Italy) Prema Powerteam	Dallara F317	4th	4th	5th

=== Complete FIA Formula 2 Championship results ===
(key) (Races in bold indicate pole position) (Races in italics indicate points for the fastest lap of top ten finishers)

Year	Entrant	1	2	3	4	5	6	7	8	9	10	11	12	13	14	15	16	17	18	19	20	21	22	23	24	DC	Points
2018	BWT Arden	BHR; FEA; 8	BHR; SPR; 2	BAK; FEA; Ret	BAK; SPR; 15†	CAT; FEA; Ret	CAT; SPR; 12	MON; FEA; 11	MON; SPR; 6	LEC; FEA; 12	LEC; SPR; 11	RBR; FEA; 15	RBR; SPR; 12	SIL; FEA; 8	SIL; SPR; 1	HUN; FEA; 16	HUN; SPR; Ret	SPA; FEA; 9	SPA; SPR; 16	MNZ; FEA; 12	MNZ; SPR; 16	SOC; FEA; 16†	SOC; SPR; 10	YMC; FEA	YMC; SPR	14th	41

^{†} Driver did not finish the race, but was classified as he completed over 90% of the race distance.

=== Complete Formula E results ===
(key) (Races in bold indicate pole position; races in italics indicate fastest lap)

Year	Team	Chassis	Powertrain	1	2	3	4	5	6	7	8	9	10	11	12	13	14	15	16	17	Pos	Points
2018–19	GEOX Dragon	Spark SRT05e	Penske EV-3	ADR; 15	MRK; 12	SCL; Ret	MEX	HKG	SYX	RME; 19†	PAR; 5	MCO; Ret	BER; 14	BRN; 5	NYC; Ret	NYC; 19					17th	20
2019–20	BMW i Andretti Motorsport	Spark SRT05e	BMW iFE.20	DIR; 18	DIR; 11	SCL; 1	MEX; 11	MRK; 2	BER; DSQ	BER; Ret	BER; 1	BER; Ret	BER; Ret	BER; 12							9th	69
2020–21	BMW i Andretti Motorsport	Spark SRT05e	BMW iFE.21	DIR; Ret	DIR; Ret	RME; 9	RME; 5	VLC; Ret	VLC; 12	MCO; 5	PUE; 12	PUE; 7	NYC; 1	NYC; 10	LDN; 18	LDN; 6	BER; 8	BER; 15			16th	66
2021–22	Nissan e.dams	Spark SRT05e	Nissan IM03	DRH; 12	DRH; 14	MEX; 9	RME; Ret	RME; 11	MCO; 17	BER; 18	BER; 16	JAK; 14	MRK; Ret	NYC; 12	NYC; DSQ	LDN; 8	LDN; 15	SEO; 11	SEO; Ret		19th	6
2022–23	Maserati MSG Racing	Formula E Gen3	Maserati Tipo Folgore	MEX; 11	DRH; DNS	DRH; 19	HYD; 13	CAP; Ret	SAP; 11	BER; 3	BER; 6	MCO; Ret	**JAK**; 3	**JAK**; 1	POR; 6	RME; 3	RME; 6	LDN; 12	LDN; 18		7th	101
2023–24	Maserati MSG Racing	Formula E Gen3	Maserati Tipo Folgore	MEX; 4	DRH; 7	DRH; 9	SAP; 9	TOK; 1	MIS; 3	MIS; 12	MCO; 9	BER; Ret	BER; Ret	SHA; 21	SHA; 8	POR; Ret	POR; 8	LDN; Ret	LDN; Ret		8th	73
2024–25	DS Penske	Formula E Gen3 Evo	DS E-Tense FE25	SAO; 11	MEX; 6	**JED**; 1	JED; Ret	MIA; 17	MCO; 10	MCO; 8	TKO; Ret	TKO; 10	**SHA**; 1	SHA; Ret	JKT; Ret	BER; 6	BER; Ret	LDN; Ret	LDN; 7		10th	85
2025–26	DS Penske	Formula E Gen3 Evo	DS E-Tense FE25	SAO; 6	MEX; 12	MIA; 19	JED; 11	JED; 11	MAD; 13	BER; 11	BER; 15	MCO; 10	MCO; 13	SAN; 6	SHA; 9	SHA; 10	TKO; 15	TKO; 9	LDN; 12	LDN; 11	18th	23

^{†} Driver did not finish the race, but was classified as he completed over 90% of the race distance. ^{*} Season still in progress.
