= Portland ePrix =

Annual Formula E race

- Portland International Raceway
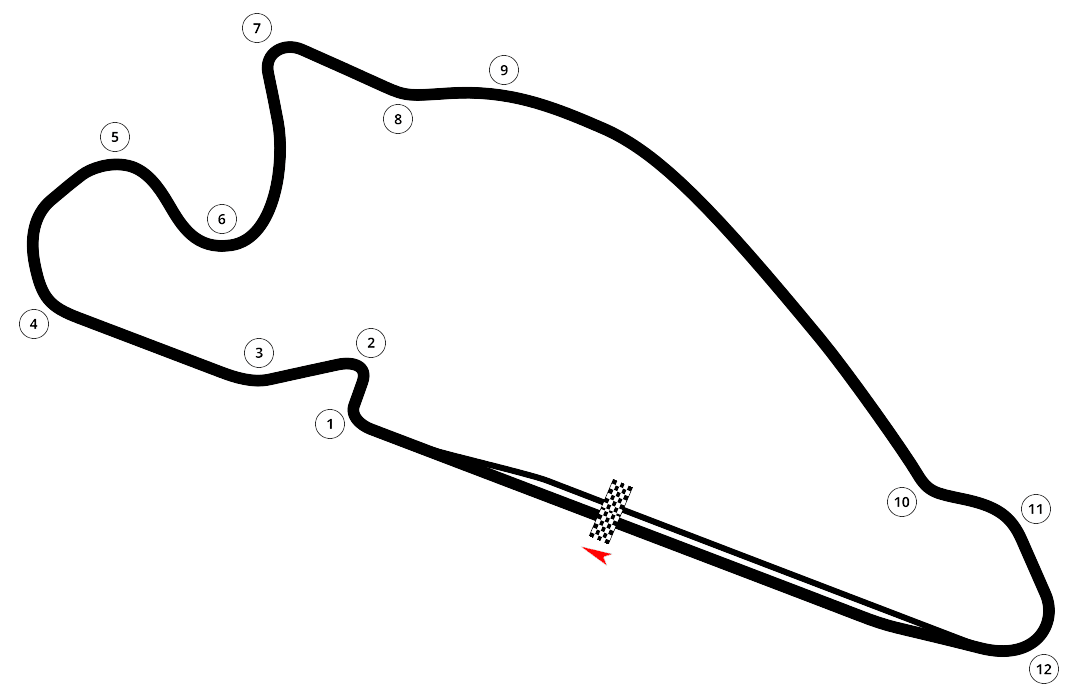

Race information
- Number of times held: 3 races over 2 years
- First held: 2023 (1 race)
- Last held: 2024 (2 races)
- Most wins (drivers): (Portugal) António Félix da Costa (2)
- Most wins (constructors): Porsche (2)
- Circuit length: 3.221 km (2.002 miles)

Last race (2024)

Pole position
- (France) Jean-Éric Vergne; DS Penske; 1:08.779

Podium
- 1. (Portugal) António Félix da Costa; Porsche; 36:21.519; 2. (Netherlands) Robin Frijns; Envision-Jaguar; +0.332; 3. (New Zealand) Mitch Evans; Jaguar; +3.194

Fastest lap
- (Netherlands) Robin Frijns; Envision-Jaguar; 1:10.650

The Portland ePrix (known as the Southwire Portland ePrix then Hankook Portland ePrix for sponsorship reasons) was an annual race of the FIA Formula E World Championship, an all-electric single-seater racing series. The race was held on a very slightly modified version of the Portland International Raceway (PIR) for the first time in 2023, and again in 2024. Nick Cassidy won the inaugural race for Envision Racing, while António Félix da Costa and Porsche swept both races the following year.

== History ==
After construction in the Red Hook area of Brooklyn caused the New York City ePrix to be taken off the calendar for 2023, Formula E signed a deal with the City of Portland and PIR in order to keep the American interest in Formula E alive over the stop-gap period in New York. FE co-founder Alberto Longo said that the Portland motorsports fanbase and the city's "ecological credentials" were vital in choosing the city to play host to Formula E. The ePrix was the first of its kind in the Pacific Northwest, the first ePrix on the US West Coast since the 2015 Long Beach ePrix, and the fourth United States ePrix following Long Beach, NYC, and the Miami ePrix.

== Circuit ==
The Portland International Raceway was home to the event, and unlike other FE races at permanent circuits such as Valencia, there were no major changes to the circuit layout (although the barrier at the entrance to the Shelton Chicane was extended to tighten Turn 1). With the ePrix debuting in 2023, this marked the third auto race held at PIR alongside IndyCar's Grand Prix of Portland and the NASCAR Xfinity Series Pacific Office Automation 147.

== Results ==
Edition	Winner	Second	Third	Pole position (Final Q Time)	Fastest race lap	Ref
2023	(New Zealand) Nick Cassidy, Envision-Jaguar	(United Kingdom) Jake Dennis, Andretti-Porsche	(Portugal) António Félix da Costa, Porsche	(United Kingdom) Jake Dennis, Andretti-Porsche (1:08:931)	(New Zealand) Mitch Evans, Jaguar (1:11:216)	
2024 Race 1	(Portugal) António Félix da Costa, Porsche	(Netherlands) Robin Frijns, Envision-Jaguar	(France) Jean-Éric Vergne, DS Penske	(New Zealand) Mitch Evans, Jaguar (1:08:820)	(United Kingdom) Jake Hughes, McLaren (1:11:327)	
2024 Race 2	(Portugal) António Félix da Costa, Porsche	(Netherlands) Robin Frijns, Envision-Jaguar	(New Zealand) Mitch Evans, Jaguar	(France) Jean-Éric Vergne, DS Penske (1:08:779)	(Netherlands) Robin Frijns, Envision-Jaguar (1:10:650)	

== See also ==
- Culture of Portland, Oregon
