= 2023 Portland ePrix =

Race 12 of 16 of the 2022–23 Formula E season
← Previous race	Next race →
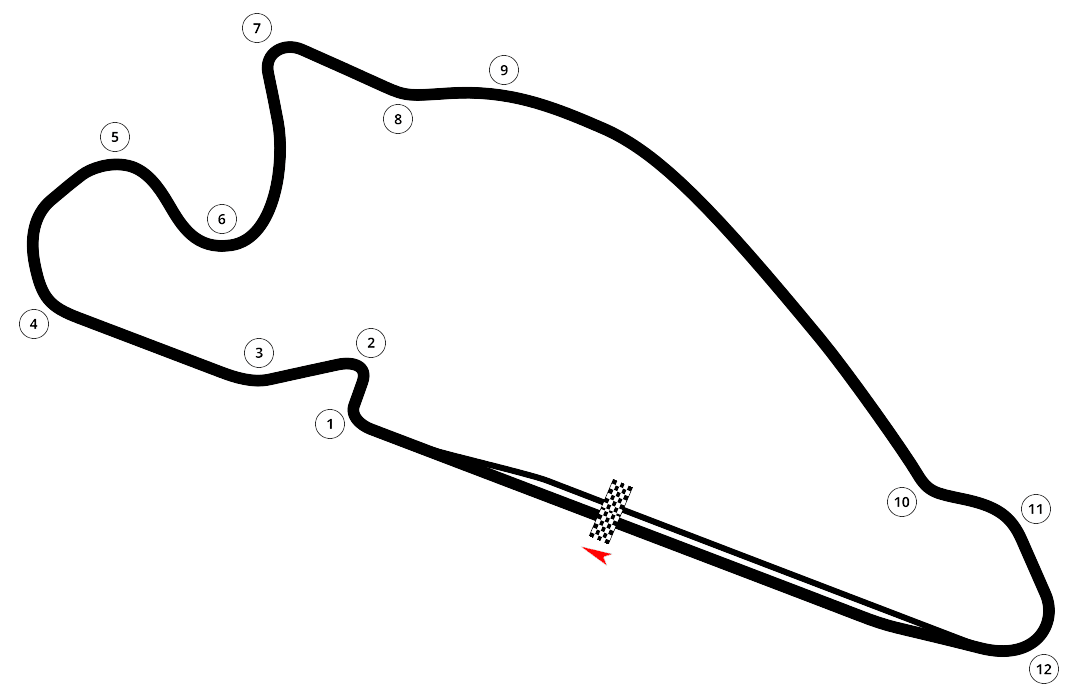

Race details
- Date: June 24, 2023
- Official name: 2023 Southwire Portland E-Prix
- Location: Portland International Raceway, Portland, Oregon, United States
- Course: Permanent racing facility
- Course length: 3.190 km (1.982 mi)
- Distance: 32 (Note: 28 planned laps and 4 extra laps) laps, 102.08 km (63.43 mi)
- Scheduled distance: 28 laps, 89.32 km (55.50 mi)

Pole position
Driver	(United Kingdom) Jake Dennis	Andretti-Porsche
- Time: 1:08.931

Fastest lap
Driver	(New Zealand) Mitch Evans	Jaguar
- Time: 1:11.216 on lap 27

Podium
First	(New Zealand) Nick Cassidy	Envision-Jaguar
Second	(United Kingdom) Jake Dennis	Andretti-Porsche
Third	(Portugal) António Félix da Costa	Porsche

The 2023 Portland ePrix, known for sponsorship reasons as the 2023 Southwire Portland E-Prix, was a Formula E electric car race held at the Portland International Raceway in Portland, Oregon, on June 24, 2023. It served as the 12th round of the 2022–23 Formula E season and was the inaugural running of the Portland ePrix.

The race was won by Nick Cassidy for Envision Racing, with Jake Dennis and António Félix da Costa completing the podium.

== Background ==
Following a win in Jakarta, Pascal Wehrlein retook the lead of the championship with 134 points, just one point ahead of Jake Dennis. Nick Cassidy lost his lead of the championship and entered Portland third in the championship, with 128 points.

=== Driver changes ===
André Lotterer returned to the Formula E season, following his absence at Jakarta due to 24 Hours of Le Mans testing.

Roberto Merhi, who replaced Oliver Rowland in Jakarta after he left Mahindra Racing, continued with the team in Portland.

== Classification ==
(All times are in PDT)

=== Qualifying ===
Qualifying took place at 12:40 PM on 24 June.

Group draw
Group A	(Germany) WEH	(New Zealand) CAS	(France) JEV	(Germany) GUE	(Switzerland) BUE	(Belgium) VAN	(France) FEN	(France) NAT	(United Kingdom) TIC	(Brazil) SET	(Switzerland) MUE
Group B	(United Kingdom) DEN	(New Zealand) EVA	(Portugal) DAC	(United Kingdom) BIR	(United Kingdom) HUG	(Germany) RAS	(Germany) LOT	(Brazil) DIG	(Switzerland) MOR	(Netherlands) FRI	(Spain) MER

==== Qualifying duels ====
Quarter-finals
A3	(France) Norman Nato
A2	(France) Jean-Éric Vergne
A4	(Germany) Maximilian Günther
A1	(France) Sacha Fenestraz
B3	(United Kingdom) Jake Hughes
B2	(United Kingdom) Jake Dennis
B4	(Portugal) António Félix da Costa
B1	(Germany) René Rast

Semi-finals
(France) Norman Nato
(France) Sacha Fenestraz
(United Kingdom) Jake Dennis
(Germany) René Rast

Final
(France) Sacha Fenestraz
(United Kingdom) Jake Dennis

==== Overall classification ====
Pos.	No.	Driver	Team	A	B	QF	SF	F	Grid
1	27	(United Kingdom) Jake Dennis	Andretti-Porsche	—N/a	1:09.856	1:09.111	1:08.919	1:08.931	1
2	23	(France) Sacha Fenestraz	Nissan	1:09.860	—N/a	1:09.060	1:08.920	1:09.010	2
3	17	(France) Norman Nato	Nissan	1:10.112	—N/a	1:09.118	1:09.264	—N/a	3
4	58	(Germany) René Rast	McLaren-Nissan	—N/a	1:09.808	1:09.310	1:09.374	—N/a	4
5	7	(Germany) Maximilian Günther	Maserati	1:10.176	—N/a	1:09.160	—N/a	—N/a	5
6	25	(France) Jean-Éric Vergne	DS	1:10.060	—N/a	1:09.240	—N/a	—N/a	PL (Note: Vergne was made to start from the pitlane due to DS Penske's illegal use of RFID scanning equipment at the pit entry.)
7	5	(United Kingdom) Jake Hughes	McLaren-Nissan	—N/a	1:09.864	1:09.385	—N/a	—N/a	6
8	13	(Portugal) António Félix da Costa	Porsche	—N/a	1:09.986	1:09.453	—N/a	—N/a	7
9	36	(Germany) André Lotterer	Andretti-Porsche	—N/a	1:09.997	—N/a	—N/a	—N/a	8
10	1	(Belgium) Stoffel Vandoorne	DS	1:10.227	—N/a	—N/a	—N/a	—N/a	PL (Note: Vandoorne was made to start from the pitlane due to DS Penske's illegal use of RFID scanning equipment at the pit entry.)
11	4	(Netherlands) Robin Frijns	ABT-Mahindra	—N/a	1:10.043	—N/a	—N/a	—N/a	9
12	37	(New Zealand) Nick Cassidy	Envision-Jaguar	1:10.282	—N/a	—N/a	—N/a	—N/a	10
13	48	(Switzerland) Edoardo Mortara	Maserati	—N/a	1:10.050	—N/a	—N/a	—N/a	11
14	51	(Switzerland) Nico Müller	ABT-Mahindra	1:10.282	—N/a	—N/a	—N/a	—N/a	12
15	11	(Brazil) Lucas di Grassi	Mahindra	—N/a	1:10.307	—N/a	—N/a	—N/a	13
16	33	(United Kingdom) Dan Ticktum	NIO	1:10.378	—N/a	—N/a	—N/a	—N/a	14
17	10	(United Kingdom) Sam Bird	Jaguar	—N/a	1:10.395	—N/a	—N/a	—N/a	15
18	16	(Switzerland) Sébastien Buemi	Envision-Jaguar	1:10.440	—N/a	—N/a	—N/a	—N/a	16
19	8	(Spain) Roberto Merhi	Mahindra	—N/a	1:10.482	—N/a	—N/a	—N/a	17
20	94	(Germany) Pascal Wehrlein	Porsche	1:10.499	—N/a	—N/a	—N/a	—N/a	18
21	3	(Brazil) Sérgio Sette Câmara	NIO	1:10.536	—N/a	—N/a	—N/a	—N/a	19
22	9	(New Zealand) Mitch Evans	Jaguar	—N/a	No time (Note: Although Evans failed to set a time in qualifying, he was permitted to race at the stewards' discretion.)	—N/a	—N/a	—N/a	20

=== Race ===
The race started at 5:03 PM on 24 June.

Pos.	No.	Driver	Team	Laps	Time/Retired	Grid	Points
1	37	(New Zealand) Nick Cassidy	Envision-Jaguar	32	50:40.629	10	25
2	27	(United Kingdom) Jake Dennis	Andretti-Porsche	32	+0.294	1	18+3^{1}
3	13	(Portugal) António Félix da Costa	Porsche	32	+1.140	7	15
4	9	(New Zealand) Mitch Evans	Jaguar	32	+1.758	20	12+1^{2}
5	16	(Switzerland) Sébastien Buemi	Envision-Jaguar	32	+2.220	16	10
6	7	(Germany) Maximilian Günther	Maserati	32	+2.307	5	8
7	11	(Brazil) Lucas di Grassi	Mahindra	32	+2.982	13	6
8	94	(Germany) Pascal Wehrlein	Porsche	32	+3.684	18	4
9	17	(France) Norman Nato	Nissan	32	+3.961	3	2
10	4	(Netherlands) Robin Frijns	ABT-Mahindra	32	+4.300	9	1
11	25	(France) Jean-Éric Vergne	DS	32	+4.718	PL	
12	1	(Belgium) Stoffel Vandoorne	DS	32	+4.982	PL	
13	33	(United Kingdom) Dan Ticktum	NIO	32	+5.470	14	
14	58	(Germany) René Rast	McLaren-Nissan	32	+6.115	4	
15	23	(France) Sacha Fenestraz	Nissan	32	+6.699	2	
16	3	(Brazil) Sérgio Sette Câmara	NIO	32	+7.167	19	
17	10	(United Kingdom) Sam Bird	Jaguar	32	+7.638 (Note: Bird received a 5-second penalty for forcing another driver off the track.)	15	
18	5	(United Kingdom) Jake Hughes	McLaren-Nissan	32	+12.977	6	
19	36	(Germany) André Lotterer	Andretti-Porsche	32	+16.051	8	
Ret	48	(Switzerland) Edoardo Mortara	Maserati	29	Retired in pits	11	
Ret	51	(Switzerland) Nico Müller	ABT-Mahindra	9	Accident	12	
Ret	8	(Spain) Roberto Merhi	Mahindra	3	Technical failure	17	

Notes:

- ^1 – Pole position.
- ^2 – Fastest lap.

==== Standings after the race ====
Drivers' Championship standings

	Pos	Driver	Points
1	1	(United Kingdom) Jake Dennis	154
1	2	(New Zealand) Nick Cassidy	153
2	3	(Germany) Pascal Wehrlein	138
	4	(New Zealand) Mitch Evans	122
	5	(France) Jean-Éric Vergne	97

Teams' Championship standings

Pos	Constructor	Points
1	(Germany) Porsche	231
2	(United Kingdom) Envision-Jaguar	225
3	(United Kingdom) Jaguar	184
4	(United States) Andretti-Porsche	177
5	(France) DS	139

- Notes: Only the top five positions are included for both sets of standings.

== Notes ==
Previous race: 2023 Jakarta ePrix	FIA Formula E World Championship; 2022–23 season	Next race: 2023 Rome ePrix
Previous race: N/A	Portland ePrix	Next race: 2024 Portland ePrix
