= ICSCC =

Founded in 1957, the International Conference of Sports Car Clubs (ICSCC) is the largest sports car racing sanctioning body in the Pacific Northwest of the United States.

The organization provides regulatory and administrative support, including guidelines for the administration and rules for competition in organized sports car racing throughout its membership area.

Each member club holds one or more racing events each year. The events are run under the umbrella rules provided by ICSCC, with the member clubs providing services at their home track.

Cars may qualify for one or more of the fifty classes defined by the organization. Drivers involved in the ICSCC compete in more than ten races each year throughout the Pacific Northwest, earning points which count towards a championship in class. With this structure, drivers earn a truly regional championship.

== Member clubs and home tracks ==
- Cascade Sports Car Club – Portland International Raceway
- International Race Drivers' Club – Pacific Raceways, The Ridge Motorsports Park
- Northwest Motorsports – Qlispé Raceway Park
- Sports Car Club of B.C. – Mission Raceway Park

== Affiliate clubs ==
- BMW Car Club of America Puget Sound Region
- Team Continental – Oregon Raceway Park
- Central Racing Association
- Victoria Motor Sports Club
- Vancouver Sports Car Club
