= 2024 London ePrix =

Race 15 of 16 of the 2023–24 Formula E season
← Previous race
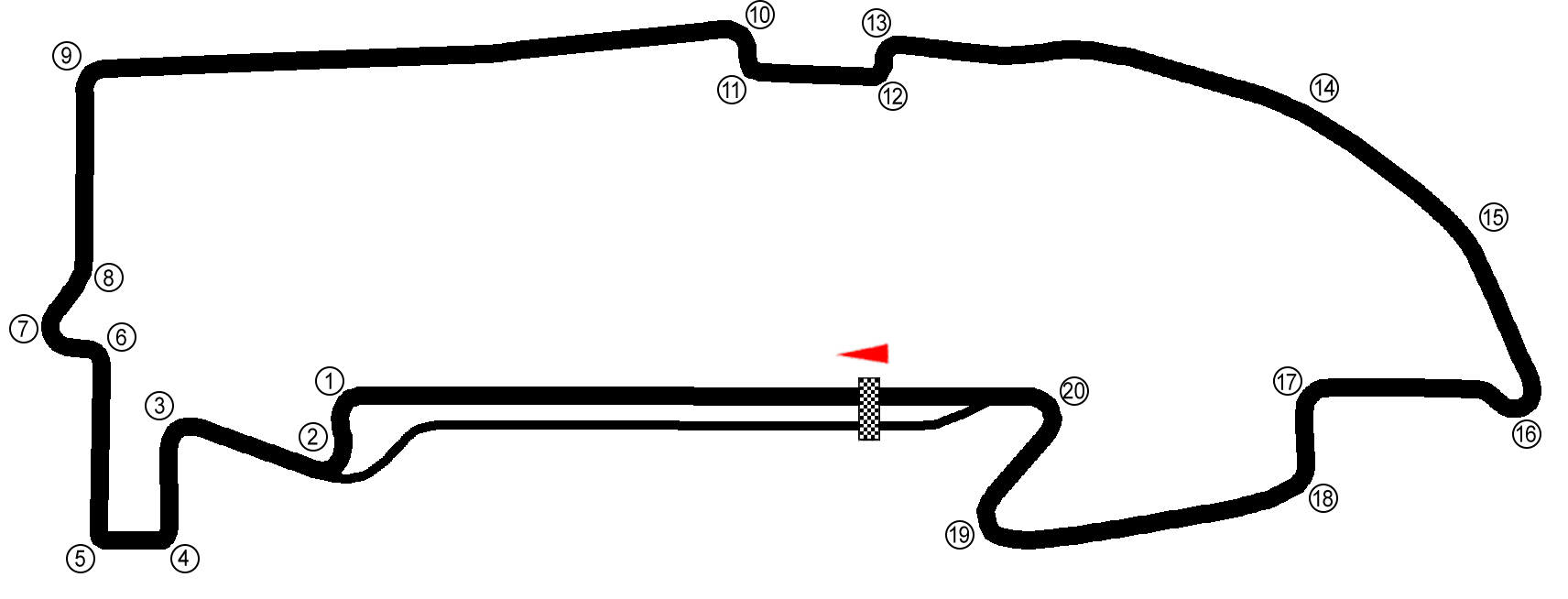

Race details
- Date: 20 July 2024
- Official name: 2024 Hankook London E-Prix
- Location: ExCeL London Circuit, Royal Docks, Newham, London
- Course: Street circuit
- Course length: 2.086 km (1.296 mi)
- Distance: 39 laps, 81.354 km (50.551 mi)
- Scheduled distance: 37 laps, 77.182 km (47.959 mi)

Pole position
| Driver | (New Zealand) Mitch Evans | Jaguar |
- Time: 1:10:622

Fastest lap
| Driver | (New Zealand) Mitch Evans | Jaguar |
- Time: 1:11:701

Podium
| First | (Germany) Pascal Wehrlein | Porsche |
| Second | (New Zealand) Mitch Evans | Jaguar |
| Third | (Switzerland) Sébastien Buemi | Envision-Jaguar |

2024 London ePrix
Race 16 of 16 of the 2023–24 Formula E season
← Previous race
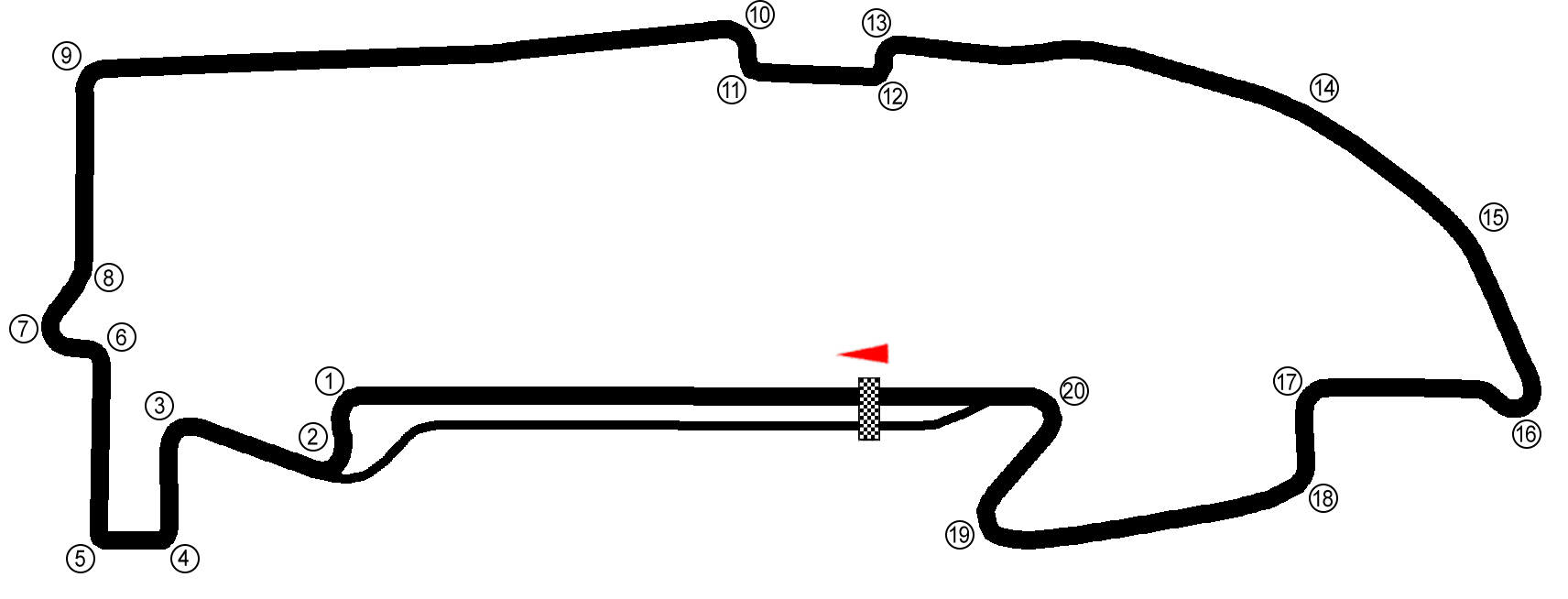

Race details
- Date: 21 July 2024
- Official name: 2024 Hankook London E-Prix
- Location: ExCeL London Circuit, Royal Docks, Newham, London
- Course: Street circuit
- Course length: 2.086 km (1.296 mi)
- Distance: 37 laps, 77.182 km (47.959 mi)
- Scheduled distance: 34 laps, 70.924 km (44.070 mi)

Pole position
| Driver | (New Zealand) Nick Cassidy | Jaguar |
- Time: 1:09:871

Fastest lap
| Driver | (United Kingdom) Jake Hughes | NEOM McLaren-Nissan |
- Time: 1:11.331

Podium
| First | (United Kingdom) Oliver Rowland | Nissan |
| Second | (Germany) Pascal Wehrlein | Porsche |
| Third | (New Zealand) Mitch Evans | Jaguar Racing |

The 2024 London ePrix, known for sponsorship reasons as the 2024 Hankook London E-Prix was a pair of Formula E electric car races held at the ExCeL London Circuit in the Royal Docks area of Newham, London on 20 and 21 July 2024. They served as the 15th and 16th rounds of the 2023–24 Formula E season and the 6th running of the London ePrix.

Pascal Wehrlein, driving for Porsche won the first race, ahead of Mitch Evans and Sébastien Buemi, driving for Jaguar and Envision, respectively. The second race was won by Oliver Rowland, driving for Nissan, ahead of Wehrlein and Evans, who were first and second, respectively, in the first race. Wehrlein was crowned World Champion in the second race.

== Background ==
Nick Cassidy led the driver's championship into the final round, with Jaguar teammate Mitch Evans and Pascal Wehrlein 12 points behind in second and third respectively. António Félix da Costa, Oliver Rowland, Jean-Éric Vergne and reigning champion Jake Dennis also entered the round in mathematical championship contention.

== Classification ==
(All times are in BST)

=== Race 1 ===
==== Qualifying ====
Qualifying for race 1 took place at 12:20 PM on 20 July.

Group draw
| Group A | (New Zealand) CAS | (Germany) WEH | (United Kingdom) ROW | (United Kingdom) DEN | (Netherlands) FRI | (United Kingdom) HUG | (United Kingdom) BIR | (Switzerland) BUE | (Switzerland) MOR | (Brazil) SET | (Netherlands) DEV |
| Group B | (New Zealand) EVA | (Portugal) DAC | (France) JEV | (Germany) GUE | (Belgium) VAN | (France) NAT | (Switzerland) MUE | (France) FEN | (United Kingdom) TIC | (India) DAR | (Brazil) DIG |

===== Qualifying duels =====
Quarter-finals
A2 | (Switzerland) Sebastien Buemi
A3 | (United Kingdom) Oliver Rowland
A1 | (Germany) Pascal Wehrlein
A4 | (Netherlands) Robin Frijns
B2 | (Switzerland) Nico Müller
B3 | (France) Norman Nato
B1 | (New Zealand) Mitch Evans
B4 | (France) Jean-Éric Vergne

Semi-finals
(Switzerland) Sebastien Buemi
(Germany) Pascal Wehrlein
(France) Norman Nato
(New Zealand) Mitch Evans

Final
(Switzerland) Sebastien Buemi
(New Zealand) Mitch Evans

===== Overall classification =====
| Pos. | No. | Driver | Team | A | B | QF | SF | F | Grid |
|---|---|---|---|---|---|---|---|---|---|
| 1 | 9 | (New Zealand) Mitch Evans | Jaguar | —N/a | 1:10.878 | 1:10:283 | 1:10.835 | 1:10.622 | 1 |
| 2 | 16 | (Switzerland) Sébastien Buemi | Envision-Jaguar | 1:11:119 | —N/a | 1:09:791 | 1:10:402 | 1:10:691 | 2 |
| 3 | 94 | (Germany) Pascal Wehrlein | Porsche | 1:10:927 | —N/a | 1:10:970 | 1:10:827 | —N/a | 3 |
| 4 | 17 | (France) Norman Nato | Andretti-Porsche | —N/a | 1:10:940 | 1:10:889 | 1:11:019 | —N/a | 4 |
| 5 | 25 | (France) Jean-Éric Vergne | DS | —N/a | 1:10:955 | 1:10:652 | —N/a | —N/a | 5 |
| 6 | 51 | (Switzerland) Nico Müller | ABT-Mahindra | —N/a | 1:10:894 | 1:10:972 | —N/a | —N/a | 6 |
| 7 | 22 | (United Kingdom) Oliver Rowland | Nissan | 1:11:121 | —N/a | 1:10:999 | —N/a | —N/a | 7 |
| 8 | 4 | (Netherlands) Robin Frijns | Envision-Jaguar | 1:11:188 | —N/a | 1:11:009 | —N/a | —N/a | 8 |
| 9 | 13 | (Portugal) António Félix da Costa | Porsche | —N/a | 1:10:990 | —N/a | —N/a | —N/a | 9 |
| 10 | 1 | (United Kingdom) Jake Dennis | Andretti-Porsche | 1:11:304 | —N/a | —N/a | —N/a | —N/a | 10 |
| 11 | 7 | (Germany) Maximilian Günther | Maserati | —N/a | 1:11:011 | —N/a | —N/a | —N/a | 11 |
| 12 | 8 | (United Kingdom) Sam Bird | McLaren-Nissan | 1:11:442 | —N/a | —N/a | —N/a | —N/a | 12 |
| 13 | 23 | (France) Sacha Fenestraz | Nissan | —N/a | 1:11:057 | —N/a | —N/a | —N/a | 13 |
| 14 | 21 | (Netherlands) Nyck de Vries | Mahindra | 1:11:487 | —N/a | —N/a | —N/a | —N/a | 14 |
| 15 | 18 | (India) Jehan Daruvala | Maserati | —N/a | 1:11:101 | —N/a | —N/a | —N/a | 15 |
| 16 | 48 | (Switzerland) Edoardo Mortara | Mahindra | 1:11:548 | —N/a | —N/a | —N/a | —N/a | 16 |
| 17 | 2 | (Belgium) Stoffel Vandoorne | DS | —N/a | 1:11:125 | —N/a | —N/a | —N/a | 17 |
| 18 | 37 | (New Zealand) Nick Cassidy | Jaguar | 1:11:551 | —N/a | —N/a | —N/a | —N/a | 18 |
| 19 | 33 | (United Kingdom) Dan Ticktum | ERT | —N/a | 1:11.136 | —N/a | —N/a | —N/a | 19 |
| 20 | 3 | (Brazil) Sérgio Sette Câmara | ERT | 1:11:799 | —N/a | —N/a | —N/a | —N/a | 20 |
| 21 | 11 | (Brazil) Lucas di Grassi | ABT-Mahindra | —N/a | 1:11:235 | —N/a | —N/a | —N/a | 21 |
| 22 | 5 | (United Kingdom) Jake Hughes | McLaren-Nissan | 1:13:888 | —N/a | —N/a | —N/a | —N/a | 22 |

==== Race ====
Race 1 started at 5:03 PM on 20 July.

Wehrlein won the race, which put him in the lead of the championship, ahead of the two Jaguars of Evans and Cassidy by 3 points and 7 points respectively. Evans finished second, while Cassidy recovered to seventh from a poor starting grid. All other four drivers who were in mathematical contention for the championship were out ahead of the final race, as Rowland collided with Félix da Costa and both drivers were out of the race. Dennis crashed into Vergne, both drivers managed to finish the race but did not score any points.

| Pos. | No. | Driver | Team | Laps | Time/Retired | Grid | Points |
|---|---|---|---|---|---|---|---|
| 1 | 94 | (Germany) Pascal Wehrlein | Porsche | 39 | 55:15:663 | 3 | 25 |
| 2 | 9 | (New Zealand) Mitch Evans | Jaguar | 39 | +0.617 | 1 | 18+3^{1}+1^{2} |
| 3 | 16 | (Switzerland) Sébastien Buemi | Envision-Jaguar | 39 | +1.457 | 2 | 15 |
| 4 | 21 | (Netherlands) Nyck de Vries | Mahindra | 39 | +2.290 | 14 | 12 |
| 5 | 48 | (Switzerland) Edoardo Mortara | Mahindra | 39 | +13.897 | 16 | 10 |
| 6 | 51 | (Switzerland) Nico Müller | ABT-Mahindra | 39 | +14.227 | 6 | 8 |
| 7 | 37 | (New Zealand) Nick Cassidy | Jaguar | 39 | +14.725 | 17 | 6 |
| 8 | 8 | (United Kingdom) Sam Bird | McLaren-Nissan | 39 | +15.209 | 12 | 4 |
| 9 | 2 | (Belgium) Stoffel Vandoorne | DS Penske | 39 | +15.794 | 20 | 2 |
| 10 | 17 | (France) Norman Nato | Andretti-Porsche | 39 | +16.515 | 4 | 1 |
| 11 | 11 | (Brazil) Lucas di Grassi | ABT Cupra-Mahindra | 39 | +16.977 | 19 | |
| 12 | 3 | (Brazil) Sérgio Sette Câmara | ERT | 39 | +17.419 | 22 | |
| 13 | 33 | (United Kingdom) Dan Ticktum | ERT | 39 | +18.249 | 18 | |
| 14 | 23 | (France) Sacha Fenestraz | Nissan | 39 | +18.712 | 13 | |
| 15 | 22 | (United Kingdom) Oliver Rowland | Nissan | 39 | +21.036 | 7 | |
| 16 | 1 | (United Kingdom) Jake Dennis | Andretti-Porsche | 39 | +33.186 | 10 | |
| 17 | 25 | (France) Jean-Éric Vergne | DS Penske | 39 | +45.199 | 5 | |
| 18 | 18 | (India) Jehan Daruvala | Maserati | 38 | +1 lap | 15 | |
| Ret | 7 | (Germany) Maximilian Günther | Maserati | 33 | Gearbox | 11 | |
| Ret | 13 | (Portugal) António Félix da Costa | Porsche | 12 | Collision | 9 | |
| Ret | 5 | (United Kingdom) Jake Hughes | McLaren-Nissan | 12 | | 21 | |
| Ret | 4 | (Netherlands) Robin Frijns | Envision-Jaguar | 0 | Collision damage | 8 | |

Notes:

- ^1 – Pole position.
- ^2 – Fastest lap.

==== Standings after the race ====
Drivers' Championship standings

| | Pos | Driver | Points |
|---|---|---|---|
| 2 | 1 | (Germany) Pascal Wehrlein | 180 |
| | 2 | (New Zealand) Mitch Evans | 177 |
| 2 | 3 | (New Zealand) Nick Cassidy | 173 |
| | 4 | (Portugal) António Félix da Costa | 134 |
| | 5 | (United Kingdom) Oliver Rowland | 131 |

Teams' Championship standings

| Pos | Team | Points |
|---|---|---|
| 1 | (United Kingdom) Jaguar | 350 |
| 2 | (Germany) Porsche | 314 |
| 3 | (United States) DS Penske | 186 |
| 4 | (United States) Andretti | 169 |
| 5 | (Japan) Nissan | 157 |

Manufacturers' Trophy standings

| Pos | Manufacturer | Points |
|---|---|---|
| 1 | (Germany) Porsche | 433 |
| 2 | (United Kingdom) Jaguar | 425 |
| 3 | (Netherlands) Stellantis | 249 |
| 4 | (Japan) Nissan | 246 |
| 5 | (India) Mahindra | 85 |

- Notes: Only the top five positions are included for all three sets of standings.

=== Race 2 ===
==== Qualifying ====
Qualifying for race 2 took place at 12:20 PM on 21 July.

Cassidy took the pole position for the final round, which awarded 3 bonus points to him. The three championship contenders were separated by 4 points ahead of the race. Evans and Wehrlein would start from third and fourth respectfully, behind Gunther's Maserati.

Group draw
| Group A | (Germany) WEH | (New Zealand) CAS | (United Kingdom) ROW | (United Kingdom) DEN | (Netherlands) FRI | (United Kingdom) BIR | (United Kingdom) HUG | (Switzerland) BUE | (France) FEN | (United Kingdom) TIC | (India) DAR |
| Group B | (New Zealand) EVA | (Portugal) DAC | (France) JEV | (Germany) GUE | (Belgium) VAN | (France) NAT | (Switzerland) MUE | (Switzerland) MOR | (Netherlands) DEV | (Brazil) SET | (Brazil) DIG |

===== Qualifying duels =====
Quarter-finals
A2 | (Germany) Pascal Wehrlein
A3 | (United Kingdom) Sam Bird
A1 | (New Zealand) Nick Cassidy
A4 | (Netherlands) Robin Frijns
B2 | (New Zealand) Mitch Evans
B3 | (Belgium) Stoffel Vandoorne
B1 | (Germany) Maximilian Günther
B4 | (France) Jean-Éric Vergne

Semi-finals
(Germany) Pascal Wehrlein
(New Zealand) Nick Cassidy
(New Zealand) Mitch Evans
(Germany) Maximilian Günther

Final
(New Zealand) Nick Cassidy
(Germany) Maximilian Günther

===== Overall classification =====
| Pos. | No. | Driver | Team | A | B | QF | SF | F | Grid |
|---|---|---|---|---|---|---|---|---|---|
| 1 | 37 | (New Zealand) Nick Cassidy | Jaguar | 1:10:323 | —N/a | 1:10:212 | 1:10:263 | 1:09:871 | 1 |
| 2 | 7 | (Germany) Maximilian Günther | Maserati | —N/a | 1:10:395 | 1:10:281 | 1:10:232 | 1:10:040 | 2 |
| 3 | 9 | (New Zealand) Mitch Evans | Jaguar | —N/a | 1:10:509 | 1:10:200 | 1:10:278 | —N/a | 3 |
| 4 | 94 | (Germany) Pascal Wehrlein | Porsche | 1:10:468 | —N/a | 1:10:216 | 1:10:426 | —N/a | 4 |
| 5 | 4 | (Netherlands) Robin Frijns | Envision-Jaguar | 1:10:655 | —N/a | 1:10:318 | —N/a | —N/a | 5 |
| 6 | 25 | (France) Jean-Éric Vergne | DS | —N/a | 1:10:592 | 1:10:355 | —N/a | —N/a | 6 |
| 7 | 2 | (Belgium) Stoffel Vandoorne | DS | —N/a | 1:10:572 | 1:10:434 | —N/a | —N/a | 7 |
| 8 | 8 | (United Kingdom) Sam Bird | McLaren-Nissan | 1:10:651 | —N/a | 1:10:598 | —N/a | —N/a | 8 |
| 9 | 22 | (United Kingdom) Oliver Rowland | Nissan | 1:10:681 | —N/a | —N/a | —N/a | —N/a | 9 |
| 10 | 13 | (Portugal) António Félix da Costa | Porsche | —N/a | 1:10:597 | —N/a | —N/a | —N/a | 10 |
| 11 | 18 | (India) Jehan Daruvala | Maserati | 1:10:759 | —N/a | —N/a | —N/a | —N/a | 11 |
| 12 | 17 | (France) Norman Nato | Andretti-Porsche | —N/a | 1:10:745 | —N/a | —N/a | —N/a | 12 |
| 13 | 33 | (United Kingdom) Dan Ticktum | ERT | 1:10:790 | —N/a | —N/a | —N/a | —N/a | 13 |
| 14 | 11 | (Brazil) Lucas di Grassi | ABT-Mahindra | —N/a | 1:10:748 | —N/a | —N/a | —N/a | 14 |
| 15 | 5 | (United Kingdom) Jake Hughes | McLaren-Nissan | 1:10:797 | —N/a | —N/a | —N/a | —N/a | 15 |
| 16 | 51 | (Switzerland) Nico Müller | ABT-Mahindra | —N/a | 1:10:797 | —N/a | —N/a | —N/a | 16 |
| 17 | 16 | (Switzerland) Sébastien Buemi | Envision-Jaguar | 1:10:800 | —N/a | —N/a | —N/a | —N/a | 17 |
| 18 | 3 | (Brazil) Sérgio Sette Câmara | ERT | —N/a | 1:10:840 | —N/a | —N/a | —N/a | 18 |
| 19 | 23 | (France) Sacha Fenestraz | Nissan | 1:10:922 | —N/a | —N/a | —N/a | —N/a | 19 |
| 20 | 48 | (Switzerland) Edoardo Mortara | Mahindra | —N/a | 1:10:966 | —N/a | —N/a | —N/a | 20 |
| 21 | 1 | (United Kingdom) Jake Dennis | Andretti-Porsche | 1:11:009 | —N/a | —N/a | —N/a | —N/a | 21 |
| 22 | 21 | (Netherlands) Nyck de Vries | Mahindra | —N/a | 1:10:983 | —N/a | —N/a | —N/a | 22 |

==== Race ====
Race 2 started at 5:03 PM on 21 July.

Evans passed Gunther at the race start as his rivals maintained their positions. On lap 6, Wehrlein overtook Gunther and slotted in behind Evans. Cassidy was leading the race at the early stage and had a different Attack Mode strategy than his rivals. He used both of his Attack Mode activations in the opening laps. He managed to maintain the lead in his first activation but lost out to both Evans and Wehrlein in the second activation. Wehrlein continued to pressure Evans for the lead, but could not get past. Evans managed the pace of the race, allowing Cassidy to stay close behind Wehrlein.

On lap 28, while Félix da Costa in the other Porsche was trying to overtake the Nissan of Rowland, the front wing of the Porsche touched the right-rear tyre of Cassidy's Jaguar, causing a puncture. Thus ending Cassidy's contention for the championship. While Cassidy was trying to drive back to the pits, he was rear-ended by Gunther. The Maserati sustained severe damage on the front suspension and was out of the race. Cassidy returned to the race with new tyres, but he came to the pits shortly after to retire the car. With a large amount of debris on track, the safety car was deployed again. Just before the safety car deployment, both Evans and Wehrlein attempted to activate their first Attack Mode. As the safety car has already been deployed, both drivers failed to activate the Attack Mode and was overtaken by Rowland. Most other drivers have completed their usage of Attack Mode by this stage. As soon as the race restarted, Evans and Wehrlein attempted again and succeeded in their first activation. However, Evans missed his second activation and had to try again in the following lap. As a result, Wehrlein inherited the second place and Evans had to manage his pace to complete the Attack Mode usage by the end of the race.

Wehrlein took the title to Evans by 6 points. Jaguar managed to secure the Teams' title. Porsche would have received the Manufacturers' Trophy, but it was handed to Jaguar after Félix da Costa was given a time penalty.

| Pos. | No. | Driver | Team | Laps | Time/Retired | Grid | Points |
|---|---|---|---|---|---|---|---|
| 1 | 22 | (United Kingdom) Oliver Rowland | Nissan | 37 | 54:30:572 | 9 | 25 |
| 2 | 94 | (Germany) Pascal Wehrlein | Porsche | 37 | +1.055 | 4 | 18 |
| 3 | 9 | (New Zealand) Mitch Evans | Jaguar | 37 | +3.782 | 3 | 15 |
| 4 | 16 | (Switzerland) Sébastien Buemi | Envision-Jaguar | 37 | +4.004 | 17 | 12 |
| 5 | 25 | (France) Jean-Éric Vergne | DS Penske | 37 | +4.805 | 6 | 10 |
| 6 | 51 | (Switzerland) Nico Müller | ABT-Mahindra | 37 | +5.202 | 16 | 8 |
| 7 | 4 | (Netherlands) Robin Frijns | Envision-Jaguar | 37 | +5.582 | 5 | 6 |
| 8 | 2 | (Belgium) Stoffel Vandoorne | DS Penske | 37 | +6.104 | 7 | 4 |
| 9 | 11 | (Brazil) Lucas di Grassi | ABT Cupra-Mahindra | 37 | +6.667 | 14 | 2 |
| 10 | 5 | (United Kingdom) Jake Hughes | McLaren-Nissan | 37 | +7.107 | 15 | 1+1^{2} |
| 11 | 3 | (Brazil) Sérgio Sette Câmara | ERT | 37 | +7.579 | 18 | |
| 12 | 17 | (France) Norman Nato | Andretti-Porsche | 37 | +8.076 | 12 | |
| 13 | 13 | (Portugal) António Félix da Costa | Porsche | 37 | +9.362 (Note: Félix da Costa was given a 5-second time penalty for causing a collision with Cassidy.) | 10 | |
| 14 | 33 | (United Kingdom) Dan Ticktum | ERT | 37 | +9.478 | 13 | |
| 15 | 23 | (France) Sacha Fenestraz | Nissan | 37 | +19.185 | 19 | |
| 16 | 21 | (Netherlands) Nyck de Vries | Mahindra | 37 | +43.480 | 22 | |
| Ret | 37 | (New Zealand) Nick Cassidy | Jaguar | 33 | Puncture | 1 | 3^{1} |
| Ret | 7 | (Germany) Maximilian Günther | Maserati | 28 | Collision damage | 2 | |
| Ret | 18 | (India) Jehan Daruvala | Maserati | 8 | Collision damage | 11 | |
| Ret | 8 | (United Kingdom) Sam Bird | McLaren-Nissan | 6 | Collision damage | 8 | |
| Ret | 48 | (Switzerland) Edoardo Mortara | Mahindra | 1 | Collision damage | 20 | |
| Ret | 1 | (United Kingdom) Jake Dennis | Andretti-Porsche | 1 | Collision damage | 21 | |

Notes:

- ^1 – Pole position.
- ^2 – Fastest lap.

==== Standings after the race ====
Drivers' Championship standings

| | Pos | Driver | Points |
|---|---|---|---|
| | 1 | (Germany) Pascal Wehrlein | 198 |
| | 2 | (New Zealand) Mitch Evans | 192 |
| | 3 | (New Zealand) Nick Cassidy | 176 |
| 1 | 4 | (United Kingdom) Oliver Rowland | 159 |
| 1 | 5 | (France) Jean-Éric Vergne | 139 |

Teams' Championship standings

| | Pos | Team | Points |
|---|---|---|---|
| | 1 | (United Kingdom) Jaguar | 368 |
| | 2 | (Germany) Porsche | 332 |
| | 3 | (United States) DS Penske | 200 |
| 1 | 4 | (Japan) Nissan | 182 |
| 1 | 5 | (United States) Andretti | 169 |

Manufacturers' Trophy standings

| | Pos | Manufacturer | Points |
|---|---|---|---|
| 1 | 1 | (United Kingdom) Jaguar | 455 |
| 1 | 2 | (Germany) Porsche | 451 |
| 1 | 3 | (Japan) Nissan | 273 |
| 1 | 4 | (Netherlands) Stellantis | 263 |
| | 5 | (India) Mahindra | 95 |

- Notes: Only the top five positions are included for all three sets of standings.

== Notes ==
| Previous race: 2024 Portland ePrix | FIA Formula E World Championship; 2023–24 season | Next race: 2024 São Paulo ePrix (December) |
| Previous race: 2023 London ePrix | London ePrix | Next race: 2025 London ePrix |
