= 2024 Portland ePrix =

Race 13 of 16 of the 2023–24 Formula E season
← Previous race	Next race →
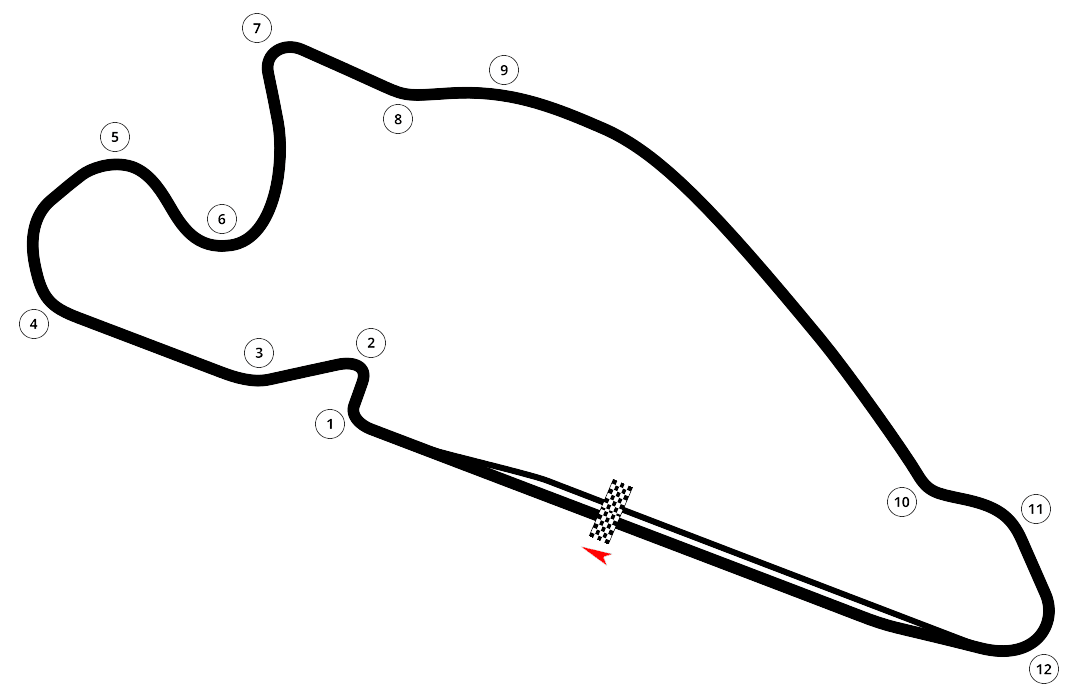

Race details
- Date: June 29, 2024
- Official name: 2024 Hankook Portland E-Prix
- Location: Portland International Raceway, Portland, Oregon, United States
- Course: Permanent racing facility
- Course length: 3.190 km (1.982 mi)

Pole position
Driver	(New Zealand) Mitch Evans	Jaguar
- Time: 1:08.664

Fastest lap
Driver	(New Zealand) Mitch Evans	Jaguar
- Time: 1:11:588

Podium
First	(Portugal) António Félix da Costa	Porsche
Second	(Netherlands) Robin Frijns	Envision-Jaguar
Third	(France) Jean-Éric Vergne	DS Penske

2024 Portland ePrix
Race 14 of 16 of the 2023–24 Formula E season
← Previous race	Next race →
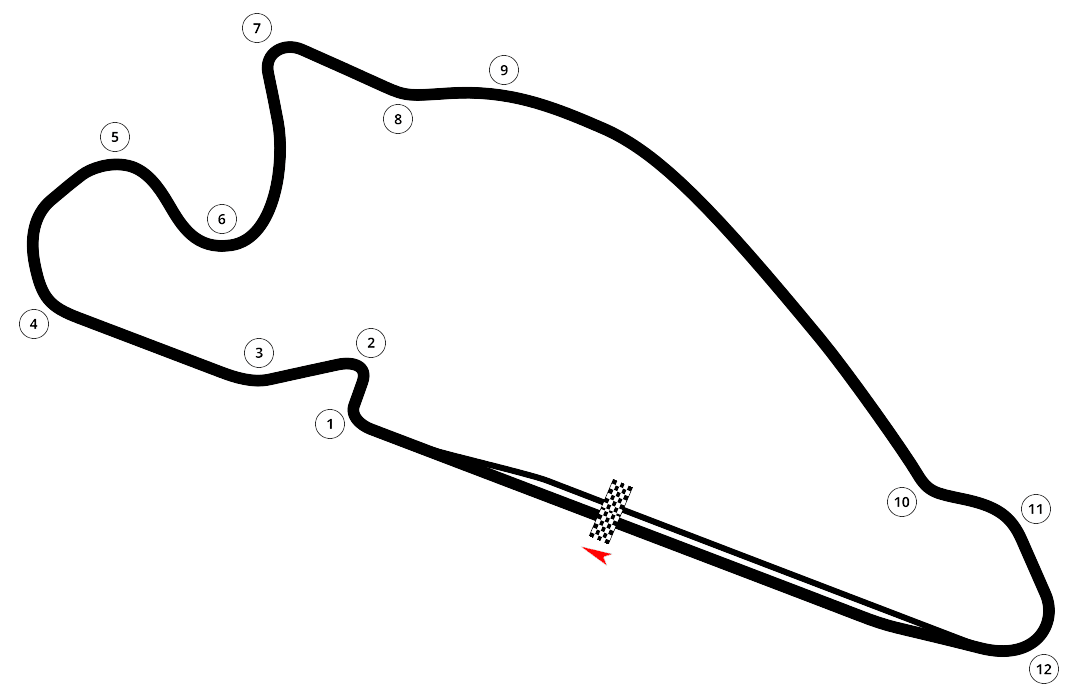

Race details
- Date: June 30, 2024
- Official name: 2024 Hankook Portland E-Prix
- Location: Portland International Raceway, Portland, Oregon, United States
- Course: Permanent racing facility
- Course length: 3.190 km (1.982 mi)
- Distance: 32 laps, 102.08 km (63.43 mi)
- Scheduled distance: 28 laps, 89.32 km (55.50 mi)

Pole position
Driver	(France) Jean-Éric Vergne	DS Penske
- Time: 1:08:779

Fastest lap
Driver	(Netherlands) Robin Frijns	Envision-Jaguar
- Time: 1:10.650

Podium
First	(Portugal) António Félix da Costa	Porsche
Second	(Netherlands) Robin Frijns	Envision-Jaguar
Third	(New Zealand) Mitch Evans	Jaguar

The 2024 Portland ePrix, known for sponsorship reasons as the 2024 Hankook Portland E-Prix, was a pair of Formula E electric car race held at the Portland International Raceway in Portland, Oregon, on June 29 and 30, 2024. It served as the 13th and 14th round of the 2023–24 Formula E season and was the second running of the Portland ePrix.

== Background ==
Following the Shanghai ePrix, Nick Cassidy led the championship with 167 points, 25 points ahead of Pascal Wehrlein and 35 points ahead of Mitch Evans.

=== Driver change ===
On 28 June, Nissan Formula E Team announced that Oliver Rowland had fallen ill and was unable to compete, with Indy NXT and Nissan reserve driver Caio Collet replacing him for the weekend.

== Classification ==
(All times are in PDT)

=== Race 1 ===
==== Qualifying ====
Qualifying took place at 9:40 AM on 29 June.

Group draw
Group A	(New Zealand) CAS	(New Zealand) EVA	(France) JEV	(Germany) GUE	(United Kingdom) HUG	(United Kingdom) BIR	(Switzerland) BUE	(Switzerland) MUE	(Brazil) SET	(Switzerland) MOR	(Brazil) DIG
Group B	(Germany) WEH	(United Kingdom) DEN	(Portugal) DAC	(Belgium) VAN	(France) NAT	(France) FEN	(Netherlands) FRI	(United Kingdom) TIC	(India) DAR	(Netherlands) DEV	(Brazil) COL

===== Qualifying duels =====
Quarter-finals
A2	(New Zealand) Mitch Evans
A3	(Brazil) Lucas di Grassi
A1	(United Kingdom) Jake Hughes
A4	(Switzerland) Edoardo Mortara
B2	(Portugal) António Félix da Costa
B3	(Netherlands) Robin Frijns
B1	(United Kingdom) Dan Ticktum
B4	(France) Norman Nato

Semi-finals
(New Zealand) Mitch Evans
(United Kingdom) Jake Hughes
(Netherlands) Robin Frijns
(France) Norman Nato

Final
(New Zealand) Mitch Evans
(France) Norman Nato

===== Overall classification =====
Pos.	No.	Driver	Team	A	B	QF	SF	F	Grid
1	9	(New Zealand) Mitch Evans	Jaguar	1:09.777	—N/a	1:08.974	1:08.664	1:08.820	1
2	17	(France) Norman Nato	Andretti-Porsche	—N/a	1:09.878	1:09.026	1:08.810	1:09.016	2
3	5	(United Kingdom) Jake Hughes	McLaren-Nissan	1:09.775	—N/a	1:08.941	1:08.925	—N/a	3
4	4	(Netherlands) Robin Frijns	Envision-Jaguar	—N/a	1:09.849	1:08.878	1:09.090	—N/a	4
5	13	(Portugal) António Félix da Costa	Porsche	—N/a	1:09.779	1:08.924	—N/a	—N/a	5
6	33	(United Kingdom) Dan Ticktum	ERT	—N/a	1:09.766	1:09.109	—N/a	—N/a	6
7	11	(Brazil) Lucas di Grassi	ABT-Mahindra	1:09.942	—N/a	1:09.357	—N/a	—N/a	7
8	48	(Switzerland) Edoardo Mortara	Mahindra	1:09.966	—N/a	1:27.183	—N/a	—N/a	8
9	51	(Switzerland) Nico Müller	ABT-Mahindra	1:09.998	—N/a	—N/a	—N/a	—N/a	9
10	94	(Germany) Pascal Wehrlein	Porsche	—N/a	1:09.899	—N/a	—N/a	—N/a	10
11	16	(Switzerland) Sébastien Buemi	Envision-Jaguar	1:10.017	—N/a	—N/a	—N/a	—N/a	11
12	1	(United Kingdom) Jake Dennis	Andretti-Porsche	—N/a	1:10.001	—N/a	—N/a	—N/a	12
13	37	(New Zealand) Nick Cassidy	Jaguar	1:10.036	—N/a	—N/a	—N/a	—N/a	13
14	22	(Brazil) Caio Collet	Nissan	—N/a	1:10.036	—N/a	—N/a	—N/a	14
15	25	(France) Jean-Éric Vergne	DS	1:10.157	—N/a	—N/a	—N/a	—N/a	15
16	23	(France) Sacha Fenestraz	Nissan	—N/a	1:10.062	—N/a	—N/a	—N/a	16
17	8	(United Kingdom) Sam Bird	McLaren-Nissan	1:10.263	—N/a	—N/a	—N/a	—N/a	17
18	2	(Belgium) Stoffel Vandoorne	DS	—N/a	1:10.098	—N/a	—N/a	—N/a	18
19	7	(Germany) Maximilian Günther	Maserati	1:10.345	—N/a	—N/a	—N/a	—N/a	19
20	18	(India) Jehan Daruvala	Maserati	—N/a	1:10.127	—N/a	—N/a	—N/a	20
21	3	(Brazil) Sérgio Sette Câmara	ERT	1:10.803	—N/a	—N/a	—N/a	—N/a	21
22	21	(Netherlands) Nyck de Vries	Mahindra	—N/a	1:10.201	—N/a	—N/a	—N/a	22

==== Race ====
The race started at 2:03 PM on 29 June.

Pos.	No.	Driver	Team	Laps	Time/Retired	Grid	Points
1	13	(Portugal) António Félix da Costa	Porsche	27	34:00.097	4	25
2	4	(Netherlands) Robin Frijns	Envision-Jaguar	27	+0.415	3	18
3	25	(France) Jean-Éric Vergne	DS Penske	27	+1.440	14	15
4	48	(Switzerland) Edoardo Mortara	Mahindra	27	+1.701	6	12
5	51	(Switzerland) Nico Müller	ABT-Mahindra	27	+2.086	7	10
6	1	(United Kingdom) Jake Dennis	Andretti-Porsche	27	+2.634	9	8
7	8	(United Kingdom) Sam Bird	McLaren-Nissan	27	+2.858	19	6
8	9	(New Zealand) Mitch Evans	Jaguar	27	+4.507 (Note: Evans was given a 5-second time penalty for causing a collision with Vergne.)	1	4+3^{1}+1^{2}
9	2	(Belgium) Stoffel Vandoorne	DS Penske	27	+5.183	16	2
10	94	(Germany) Pascal Wehrlein	Porsche	27	+5.653	8	1
11	11	(Brazil) Lucas di Grassi	ABT Cupra-Mahindra	27	+6.325	12	
12	21	(Netherlands) Nyck de Vries	Mahindra	27	+6.477	20	
13	17	(France) Norman Nato	Andretti-Porsche	27	+6.487	11	
14	3	(Brazil) Sérgio Sette Câmara	ERT	27	+6.857	21	
15	23	(France) Sacha Fenestraz	Nissan	27	+8.686	15	
16	18	(India) Jehan Daruvala	Maserati	27	+9.031	18	
17	33	(United Kingdom) Dan Ticktum	ERT	27	+9.186	5	
18	22	(Brazil) Caio Collet	Nissan	27	+15.005	13	
19	37	(New Zealand) Nick Cassidy	Jaguar	27	+15.445	10	
20	16	(Switzerland) Sébastien Buemi	Envision-Jaguar	27	+58.409	22	
21	5	(United Kingdom) Jake Hughes	McLaren-Nissan	26	+1 lap	2	
Ret	7	(Germany) Maximilian Günther	Maserati	22	Radiator/Collision Damage	17	

Notes:

- ^1 – Pole position.
- ^2 – Fastest lap.

==== Standings after the race ====
Drivers' Championship standings

	Pos	Driver	Points
	1	(New Zealand) Nick Cassidy	167
	2	(Germany) Pascal Wehrlein	143
1	3	(New Zealand) Mitch Evans	140
1	4	(United Kingdom) Oliver Rowland	131
	5	(United Kingdom) Jake Dennis	121

Teams' Championship standings

	Pos	Team	Points
	1	(United Kingdom) Jaguar	307
	2	(Germany) Porsche	252
1	3	(United States) DS Penske	171
1	4	(United States) Andretti	161
2	5	(Japan) Nissan	157

Manufacturers' Trophy standings

Pos	Manufacturer	Points
1	(Germany) Porsche	370
2	(United Kingdom) Jaguar	354
3	(Japan) Nissan	242
4	(Netherlands) Stellantis	230
5	(India) Mahindra	55

- Notes: Only the top five positions are included for all three sets of standings.

=== Race 2 ===
==== Qualifying ====
Qualifying took place at 9:40 AM on 30 June.

Group draw
Group A	(New Zealand) CAS	(New Zealand) EVA	(France) JEV	(Germany) GUE	(United Kingdom) HUG	(Netherlands) FRI	(Switzerland) MUE	(Switzerland) BUE	(United Kingdom) TIC	(India) DAR	(Brazil) DIG
Group B	(Germany) WEH	(United Kingdom) DEN	(Portugal) DAC	(Belgium) VAN	(United Kingdom) BIR	(France) NAT	(France) FEN	(Switzerland) MOR	(Brazil) SET	(Netherlands) DEV	(Brazil) COL

===== Qualifying duels =====
Quarter-finals
A2	(France) Jean-Éric Vergne
A3	(New Zealand) Nick Cassidy
A1	(Netherlands) Robin Frijns
A4	(United Kingdom) Jake Hughes
B2	(United Kingdom) Sam Bird
B3	(Netherlands) Nyck de Vries
B1	(Portugal) António Félix da Costa
B4	(Germany) Pascal Wehrlein

Semi-finals
(France) Jean-Éric Vergne
(Netherlands) Robin Frijns
(United Kingdom) Sam Bird
(Portugal) António Félix da Costa

Final
(France) Jean-Éric Vergne
(Portugal) António Félix da Costa

===== Overall classification =====
Pos.	No.	Driver	Team	A	B	QF	SF	F	Grid
1	25	(France) Jean-Éric Vergne	DS	1:09.677	—N/a	1:08.875	1:08.862	1:08.779	1
2	13	(Portugal) António Félix da Costa	Porsche	—N/a	1:09.726	1:08.750	1:08.856	1:08.804	2
3	8	(United Kingdom) Sam Bird	McLaren-Nissan	—N/a	1:09.785	1:09.138	1:08.990	—N/a	3
4	4	(Netherlands) Robin Frijns	Envision-Jaguar	1:09.665	—N/a	1:08.819	1:09.081	—N/a	4
5	5	(United Kingdom) Jake Hughes	McLaren-Nissan	1:09.755	—N/a	1:08.833	—N/a	—N/a	5
6	37	(New Zealand) Nick Cassidy	Jaguar	1:09.737	—N/a	1:09.016	—N/a	—N/a	6
7	94	(Germany) Pascal Wehrlein	Porsche	—N/a	1:09.853	1:09.123	—N/a	—N/a	7
8	21	(Netherlands) Nyck de Vries	Mahindra	—N/a	1:09.810	1:09.330	—N/a	—N/a	8
9	18	(India) Jehan Daruvala	Maserati	1:09.758	—N/a	—N/a	—N/a	—N/a	9
10	2	(Belgium) Stoffel Vandoorne	DS	—N/a	1:09.857	—N/a	—N/a	—N/a	10
11	9	(New Zealand) Mitch Evans	Jaguar	1:09.821	—N/a	—N/a	—N/a	—N/a	11
12	48	(Switzerland) Edoardo Mortara	Mahindra	—N/a	1:09.885	—N/a	—N/a	—N/a	12
13	51	(Switzerland) Nico Müller	ABT-Mahindra	1:09.836	—N/a	—N/a	—N/a	—N/a	13
14	23	(France) Sacha Fenestraz	Nissan	—N/a	1:09.906	—N/a	—N/a	—N/a	14
15	33	(United Kingdom) Dan Ticktum	ERT	1:09.869	—N/a	—N/a	—N/a	—N/a	15
16	3	(Brazil) Sérgio Sette Câmara	ERT	—N/a	1:09.979	—N/a	—N/a	—N/a	16
17	16	(Switzerland) Sébastien Buemi	Envision-Jaguar	1:09.913	—N/a	—N/a	—N/a	—N/a	17
18	1	(United Kingdom) Jake Dennis	Andretti-Porsche	—N/a	1:09.983	—N/a	—N/a	—N/a	18
19	11	(Brazil) Lucas di Grassi	ABT-Mahindra	1:09.998	—N/a	—N/a	—N/a	—N/a	19
20	17	(France) Norman Nato	Andretti-Porsche	—N/a	1:10.015	—N/a	—N/a	—N/a	20
21	7	(Germany) Maximilian Günther	Maserati	1:10.005	—N/a	—N/a	—N/a	—N/a	21
22	22	(Brazil) Caio Collet	Nissan	—N/a	1:10.061	—N/a	—N/a	—N/a	22

==== Race ====
The race started at 2:03 PM on 30 June.

Pos.	No.	Driver	Team	Laps	Time/Retired	Grid	Points
1	13	(Portugal) António Félix da Costa	Porsche	27	36:21.519	2	25
2	4	(Netherlands) Robin Frijns	Envision-Jaguar	27	+0.332	4	18+1^{2}
3	9	(New Zealand) Mitch Evans	Jaguar	27	+3.194	11	15
4	94	(Germany) Pascal Wehrlein	Porsche	27	+3.262	7	12
5	25	(France) Jean-Éric Vergne	DS Penske	27	+3.683	1	10+3^{1}
6	51	(Switzerland) Nico Müller	ABT-Mahindra	27	+3.785	13	8
7	17	(France) Norman Nato	Andretti-Porsche	27	+4.887	20	8
8	7	(Germany) Maximilian Günther	Maserati	27	+5.692	21	4
9	16	(Switzerland) Sébastien Buemi	Envision-Jaguar	27	+6.250	17	2
10	1	(United Kingdom) Jake Dennis	Andretti-Porsche	27	+6.840	18	1
11	2	(Belgium) Stoffel Vandoorne	DS Penske	27	+7.490	10	
12	18	(India) Jehan Daruvala	Maserati	27	+7.928	9	
13	37	(New Zealand) Nick Cassidy	Jaguar	27	+8.078	6	
14	3	(Brazil) Sérgio Sette Câmara	ERT	27	+10.044	16	
15	33	(United Kingdom) Dan Ticktum	ERT	27	+10.111	15	
16	22	(Brazil) Caio Collet	Nissan	27	+11.290	22	
17	11	(Brazil) Lucas di Grassi	ABT Cupra-Mahindra	27	+12.575	19	
18	23	(France) Sacha Fenestraz	Nissan	27	+20.628	14	
Ret	48	(Switzerland) Edoardo Mortara	Mahindra	24	Accident	12	
Ret	8	(United Kingdom) Sam Bird	McLaren-Nissan	20	Damage	3	
Ret	21	(Netherlands) Nyck de Vries	Mahindra	20		8	
Ret	5	(United Kingdom) Jake Hughes	McLaren-Nissan	12	Collision Damage	5	

Notes:

- ^1 – Pole position.
- ^2 – Fastest lap.

==== Standings after the race ====
Drivers' Championship standings

	Pos	Driver	Points
	1	(New Zealand) Nick Cassidy	167
1	2	(New Zealand) Mitch Evans	155
1	3	(Germany) Pascal Wehrlein	155
3	4	(Portugal) António Félix da Costa	134
1	5	(United Kingdom) Oliver Rowland	131

Teams' Championship standings

Pos	Team	Points
1	(United Kingdom) Jaguar	322
2	(Germany) Porsche	289
3	(United States) DS Penske	184
4	(United States) Andretti	168
5	(Japan) Nissan	157

Manufacturers' Trophy standings

	Pos	Manufacturer	Points
	1	(Germany) Porsche	407
	2	(United Kingdom) Jaguar	388
1	3	(Netherlands) Stellantis	247
1	4	(Japan) Nissan	242
	5	(India) Mahindra	63

- Notes: Only the top five positions are included for all three sets of standings.

== Notes ==
Previous race: 2024 Shanghai ePrix	FIA Formula E World Championship; 2023–24 season	Next race: 2024 London ePrix
Previous race: 2023 Portland ePrix	Portland ePrix	Next race: N/A
