= Gerd E. Mäuser =

German businessman (born 1958)

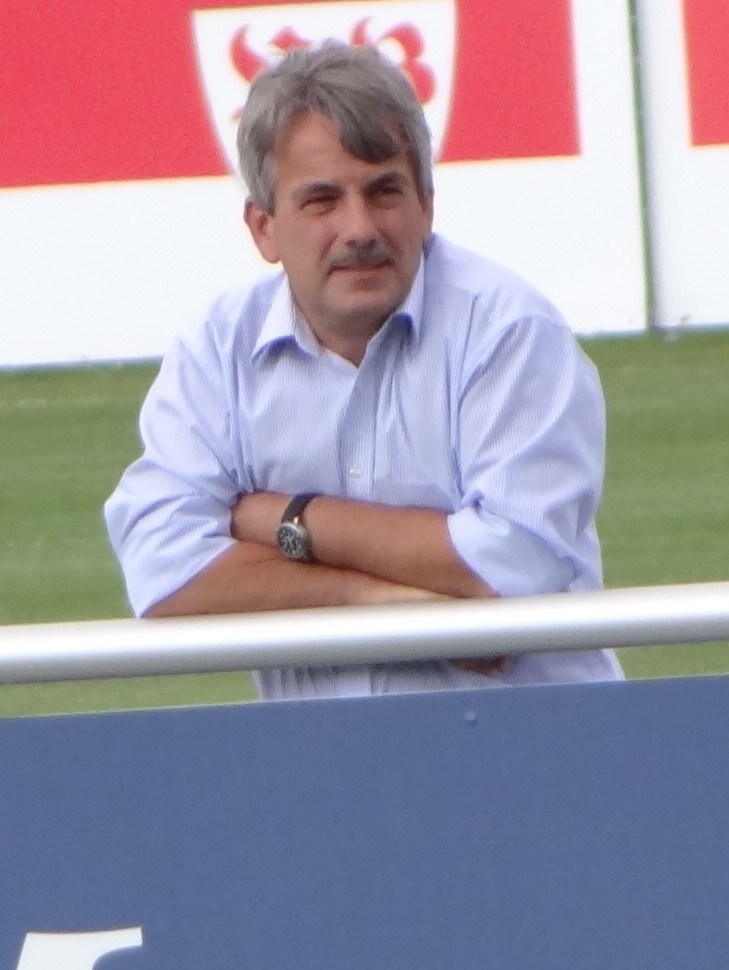
Gerd E. Mäuser

Gerd Ernst Mäuser (born 16 March 1958 in Berlin) is a German businessman who is currently Chairman of Jaguar Racing. He previously had a long career at Porsche, having also worked at BMW, VfB Stuttgart, and Jaguar Land Rover.

== Background ==
Mäuser studied Economics (Business Administration) with a specialisation in Marketing and Strategic Planning at Goethe University, Frankfurt am Main graduating in 1985.

== Career ==
=== BMW ===
Upon graduation, Mäuser joined BMW as a trainee, and from 1987 held a number of positions at the company including: Manager of Marketing and Product Strategy, General Manager of Marketing and Planning and Director of Corporate Marketing.

=== Porsche ===
In 1994, Mäuser was appointed Director of Corporate Marketing at Porsche. His main responsibilities covered global brand-management, including the complete marketing-mix activities, as well as long term corporate planning for sales and marketing. His time at Porsche coincided with Wendelin Wiedeking's tenure as CEO, which saw a significant reversal in Porsche's fortunes from near bankruptcy to a near takeover of Volkswagen. Mäuser's department was responsible for overseeing the marketing launch of a number of new Porsche nameplates: the 1996 Boxster, the 2003 Cayenne, the 2006 Cayman, the 2009 Panamera, as well as more specialised cars like the 1997 911 GT1 Straßenversion and the 2004 Carrera GT. The Boxster and Cayenne in particular were instrumental in growing Porsche sales, with the Boxster competing in a lower price segment and the Cayenne entering the growing SUV segment. He left Porsche by mutual consent in 2010.

=== VfB Stuttgart ===
On 20 May 2011 the supervisory board of VfB Stuttgart presented Gerd E. Mäuser as their candidate for the election of the new president of the club. On 17 July 2011 Mäuser was elected. VfB Stuttgart subsequently finished 6th in the 2011-12 Bundesliga, qualifying for the UEFA Europa League. The following league campaign was less successful with VfB Stuttgart finishing 12th in the 2012-13 Bundesliga, but they did reach the DFB-Pokal final losing 3-2 to FC Bayern Munich. They reached the round of 16 in the UEFA Europa League, losing to S.S. Lazio.

After less than 2 years and with occasional minor outbursts, Mäuser announced his resignation on 10 April 2013 with effect from 3 June 2013.

=== Jaguar Land Rover ===
In 2013 Mäuser worked as an independent consultant for Jaguar Cars, before being appointed Chief Marketing Officer in January 2015 for Jaguar Land Rover. Mäuser's marketing department was responsible for all marketing activities including customer research, product marketing, communications, experiential, and marketing launch. He was instrumental in Jaguar's 2016 return to racing in the Formula E category, and was appointed Chairman of Jaguar Racing. His department also helped the market introduction of the 2015 Jaguar XE, 2016 Jaguar XF, 2016 Jaguar F-PACE, 2015 Land Rover Discovery Sport, 2017 Land Rover Discovery, 2017 Range Rover Velar, and 2015 Range Rover Evoque facelift, 2017 Range Rover Sport facelift, and 2017 Range Rover facelift. His time was marked by a simplification of the customer product offering with most cars moving adopting S, SE, HSE, and R-Dynamic nomenclature. He retired in 2018.

=== Jaguar Racing ===
Following his retirement from Jaguar Land Rover, he remained Chairman of the Formula E Jaguar Racing Team. He was "central" to Jaguar's first race victory in the category at the 2019 Rome ePrix, Jaguar's first international victory since 1991.
