= Jaguar Racing (Formula E) =

British Formula E team

(United Kingdom) Jaguar TCS Racing
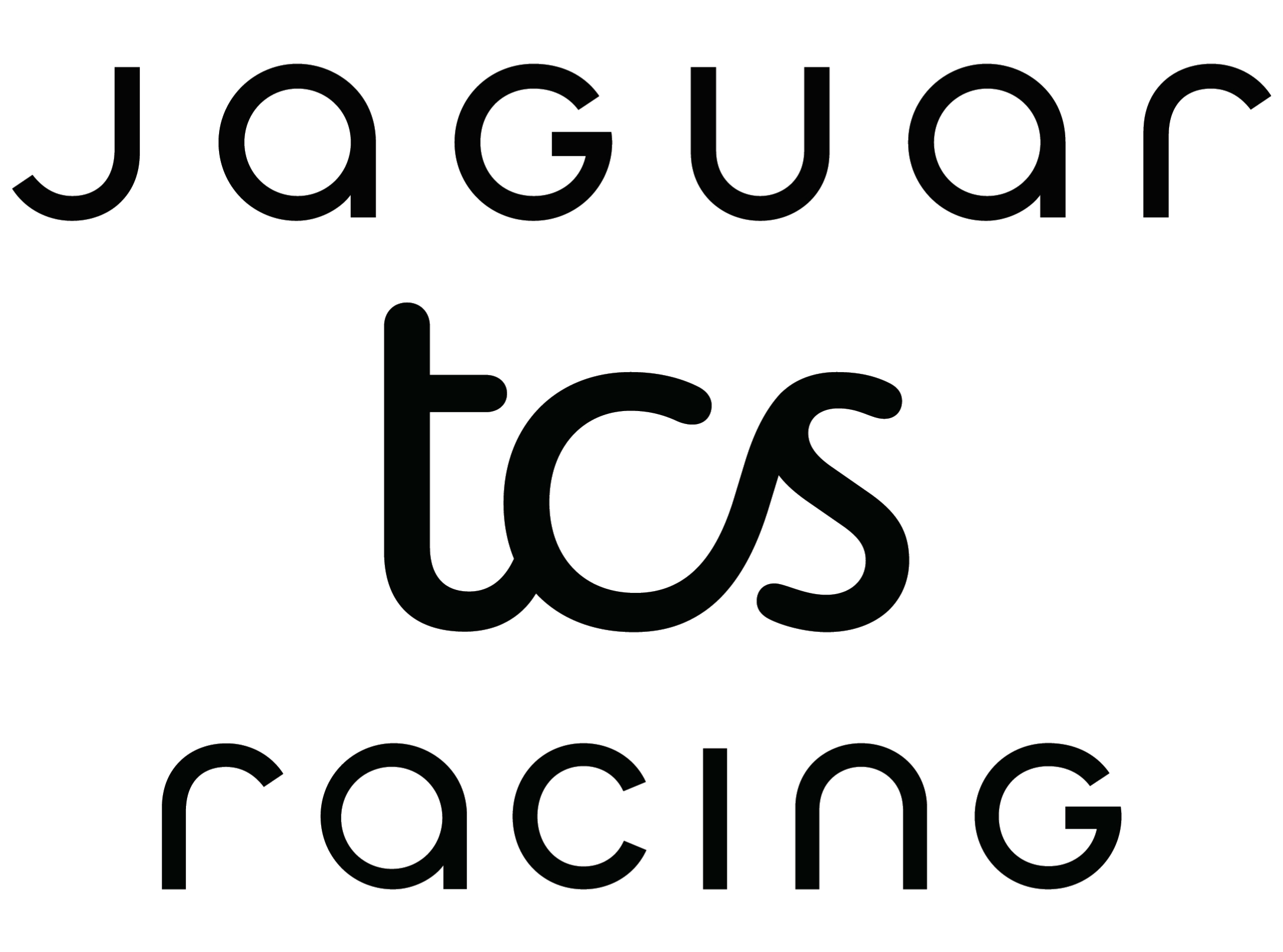
- Founded: 2016
- Base: Kidlington, Oxfordshire
- Team principal(s): Ian James
- Current series: Formula E
- Current drivers: (Belgium) Stoffel Vandoorne (Portugal) António Félix da Costa (France) Tom Dillmann (Note: Reserve driver and simulator driver) (United Kingdom) Jamie Chadwick (Note: Rookie and Test driver)
- Noted drivers: (United Kingdom) Adam Carroll (Brazil) Nelson Piquet Jr (United Kingdom) Alex Lynn (United Kingdom) Tom Blomqvist (United Kingdom) Sam Bird (France) Norman Nato (New Zealand) Nick Cassidy (New Zealand) Mitch Evans
- Races: 144
- Wins: 26
- Podiums: 63
- Poles: 13
- Points: 1926
- Teams' Championships: 2023–24, 2025–26
- First entry: 2016 Hong Kong ePrix
- Last entry: 2026 London ePrix
- First win: 2019 Rome ePrix
- Last win: 2026 Berlin ePrix (R1)
- Website: jaguar.com/jaguar-racing

Jaguar Racing is the name given to Jaguar Land Rover's racing interests. The Jaguar brand currently competes in Formula E under the name Jaguar TCS Racing for sponsorship reasons. It won the 2023–24 Formula E World Teams' Championship, and currently holds the record for most race wins, having surpassed the record previously held by Nissan and e.dams with Jaguar’s 24th race win in the 2026 Jeddah ePrix.

== History ==
In December 2015, Jaguar announced that it would start a Formula E team, building its own chassis and powertrain. Panasonic agreed to become the team's lead sponsor, with secondary sponsorship from Lear Corporation. The team also signed Gorillaz guitarist Noodle as a team ambassador, and launched a commercial in which Noodle drives an electric open-wheeled car before getting out and saying the experience could be improved.

=== 2016–17 season ===
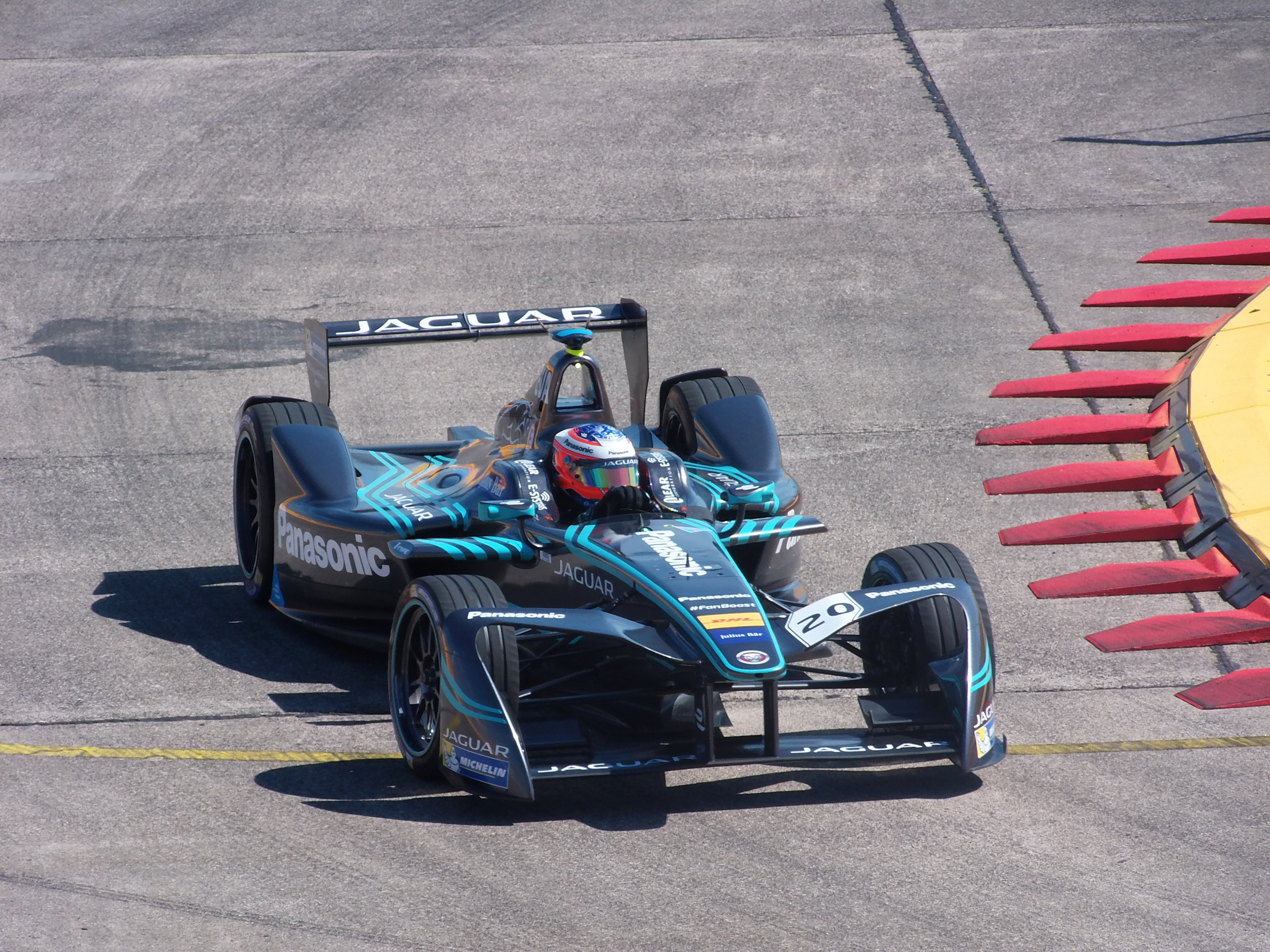
Mitch Evans driving the Jaguar I-Type 1 at the 2017 Berlin ePrix.

Jaguar made their debut in the 2016–17 season, replacing the folded Trulli GP. The team signed A1 GP champion Adam Carroll and 2012 GP3 champions Mitch Evans as its drivers. Jaguar finished 10th in the Teams' Championship, with the best result being a double points finish of 4th and 8th at the 2017 Mexico City ePrix. Carroll along with Andretti's Robin Frijns were the only two drivers to finish all 12 races of the season.

=== 2017–18 season ===
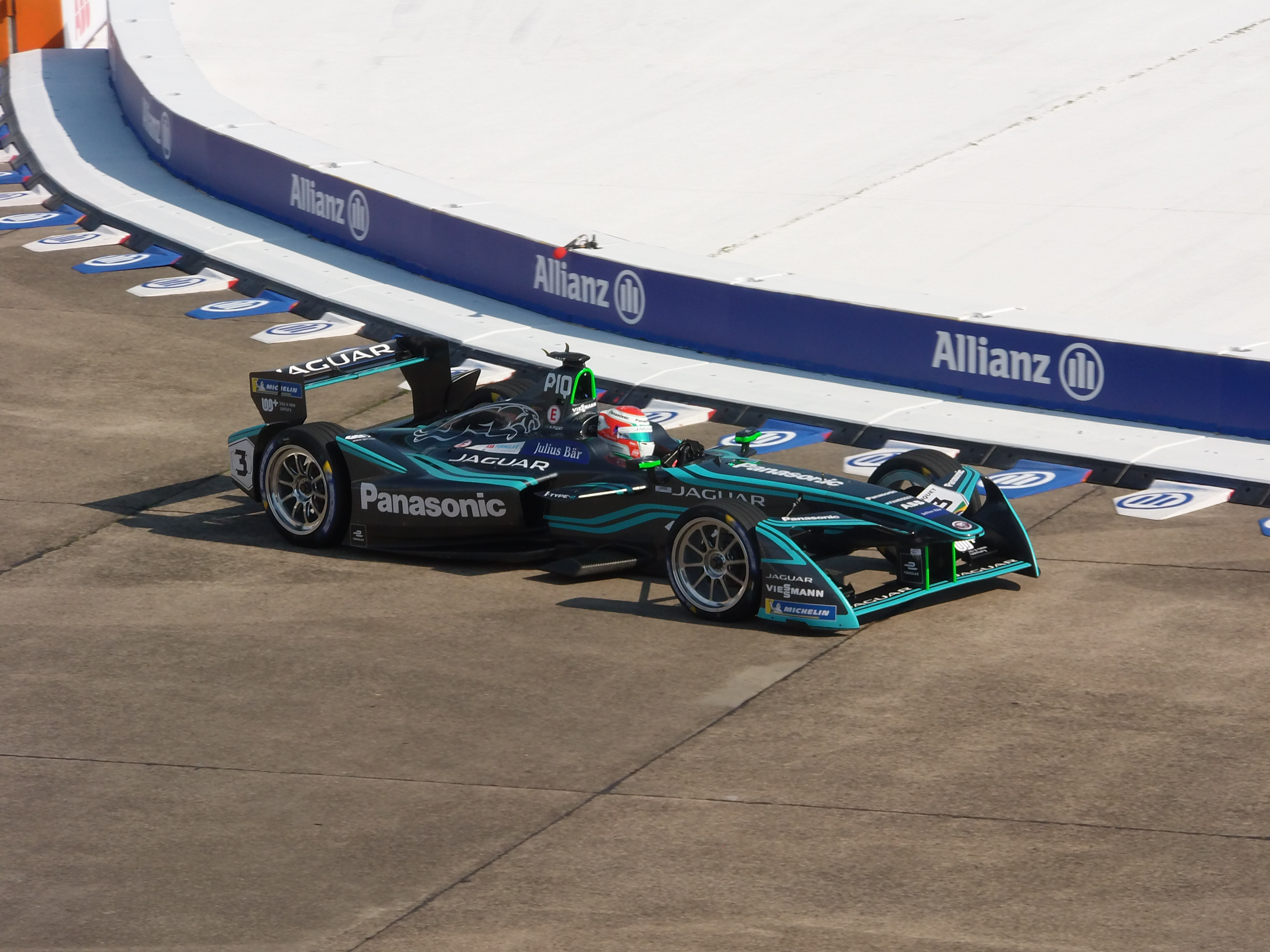
Nelson Piquet Jr. (pictured at the 2018 Berlin ePrix) was the team's first major signing.

Prior to the season, Jaguar entered a multi-year partnership with GKN. A new sponsorship deal with Viessmann was also announced. In an effort to boost its chances at good results, Jaguar signed Nelson Piquet Jr., the series' inaugural Drivers' Champion. Piquet had the option to stay with his previous employer NIO, but chose not to as a performance clause allowed him to exit the team. Evans was retained to partner Piquet, who replaced Carroll. Ho-Pin Tung remained with the team for another season as a reserve driver. At the season's first event in Hong Kong, Jaguar scored points in both of the weekend's races and took their first podium in the series when Mitch Evans was moved up to third following a post race disqualification of Daniel Abt. The team used Paul di Resta and Pietro Fittipaldi for a rookie test held in Marrakesh which followed the 2018 Marrakesh ePrix. At the Zürich ePrix, Evans claimed the team's maiden pole position.

Jaguar would finish 6th in Teams' Championship, with the best result being Evans' inherited third place in the second race of the 2017 Hong Kong ePrix. The team managed three double points finishes throughout the season. Both drivers finished in top 10 of the Drivers' Championship – Evans was seventh, while Piquet ended the season at ninth place. Piquet, however, also had the most retirements out of all drivers who competed in the season – he missed the chequered flag five times.

=== 2018–19 season ===
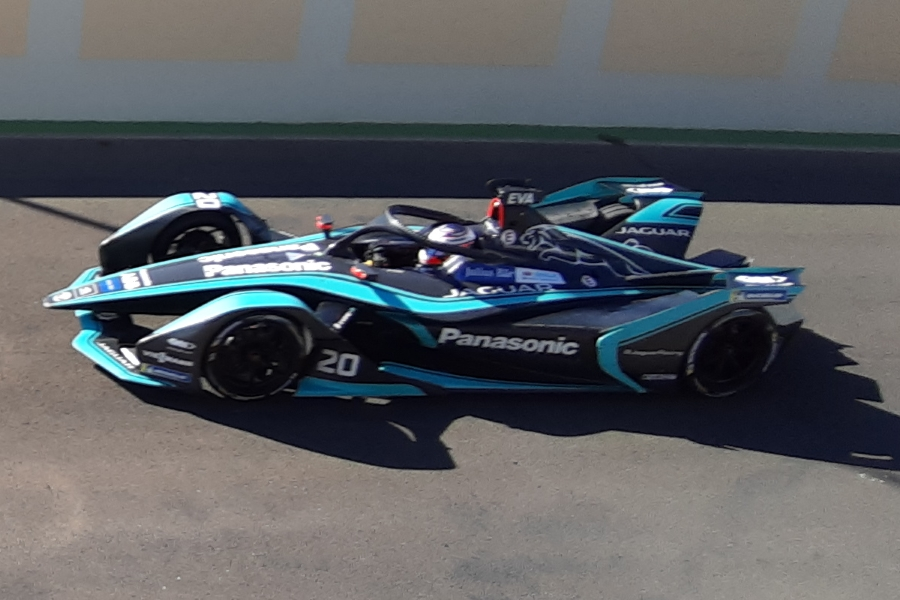
Evans driving the I-Type 3 at the 2019 Marrakesh ePrix. This car/driver combination would give the team its first victory at the 2019 Rome ePrix.

Evans and Piquet were retained for the 2018–19 season. Ho-Pin Tung was also retained in his position. In addition to his reserve driver duty, Tung also served as a pundit and was part of the Jaguar I-Pace eTrophy broadcast team. For the 2019 rookie test (which was once again held in Marrakesh following the ePrix), the team opted to bring back Pietro Fittipaldi and pair him with Harry Tincknell. In March 2019, just after the inaugural Sanya ePrix, Piquet left the team following a string of poor results (in contrast to Evans' string of points finishes) and was replaced by former Virgin driver Alex Lynn. Evans managed to win the following race in Rome, giving Jaguar their first win – this was also the team's first actual podium finish in the series. His teammate Lynn finished 12th on his Jaguar debut. Evans' car was subsequently sent to the FIA headquarters in Geneva for checks to analyse one of the wishbones and its compliance with the wishbone/arm element sealed at the homologation. No issues were found, thus the win became officially confirmed.

Evans' point-scoring streak came to an end in a rain-soaked Paris ePrix, where he was the last driver to physically cross the finish line in sixteenth place, being a lap down after an unscheduled pit stop for a new nose. Lynn was forced to retire from a promising eleventh place after an accident with Venturi's Edoardo Mortara, effectively ending Jaguar's chances to score points in this round. As a result, this was the first race of the season where both cars failed to score points. The following race in Monaco was a success, with both cars finishing on points for the first time since the opening round in Ad Diriyah. The race also marked Lynn's first point-scoring finish for the team. The team had a strong finish to the season, with Evans picking up multiple podium finishes, which even inserted him into Drivers' Championship fight at the Swiss ePrix, after which he found himself third in the ongoing championship with 87 points. Lynn was mostly dealing with reliability issues, most notably retiring from second place in the first New York City race at the Brooklyn Street Circuit.

Despite improved form in the second half of the season, Jaguar would finish 7th in Teams' Championship with 116 points, which is down from a 6th place achieved in the previous season. Evans, however, improved his result in Drivers' Championship as he finished fifth with 105 points, only three points short from Lucas di Grassi, who finished third. Evans was also the only driver who managed to physically cross the finish line in every race of the season, even though Audi's Daniel Abt was classified in every race as well (but failed to finish in Rome as he retired in the final lap).

=== 2019–20 season ===
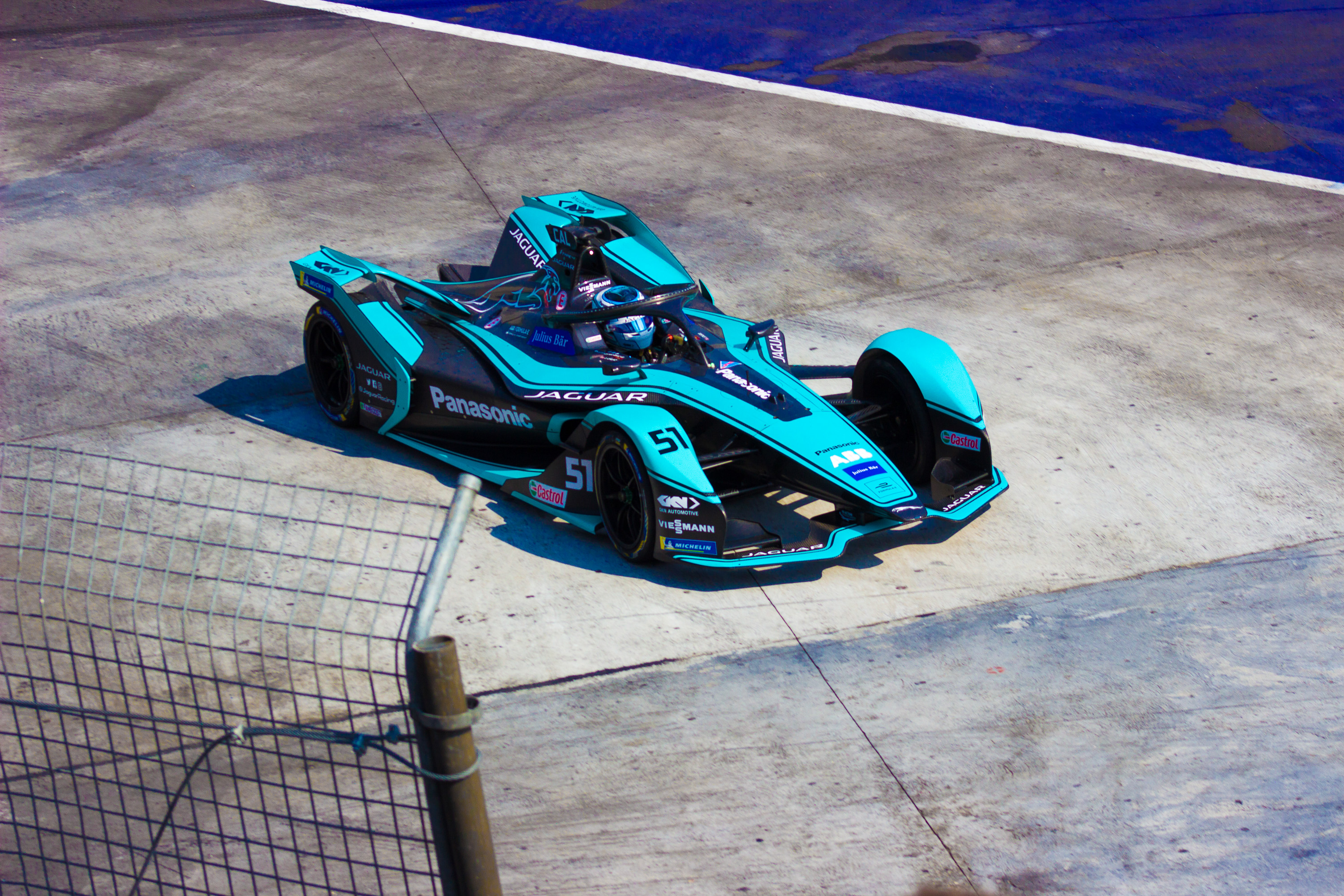
James Calado driving the I-Type 4 at the 2020 Mexico City ePrix, from which he was later disqualified.

In June 2019, Jaguar began their season six development testings with Alex Lynn and Mitch Evans. The team also tested James Calado, a potential candidate for the second seat. On 26 September, Jaguar formally confirmed Evans as their first driver as he signed a multi-year contract with the team. This will be Evans' fourth consecutive season with Jaguar. On 2 October, Calado was confirmed as Evans' teammate. On the same day, Jaguar also unveiled the new I-Type 4 along with Castrol as its new partner, which returns to Jaguar's motorsport activities after a near 30-year absence. On 7 January 2020, it was announced that Alex Lynn was brought back to the team to become a reserve and test driver. With this move, Ho-Pin Tung, Jaguar's previous reserve driver, became the Jaguar Racing Global Ambassador while also remaining in the I-Pace eTrophy commentary team.

At the Mexico City ePrix, Evans gave Jaguar their second Formula E win while also picking up a second consecutive bonus point for being the fastest driver in group qualifying stage. Calado finished ninth, but was later disqualified for a technical infringement. On 19 February, Jaguar announced Jamie Chadwick as the first of the two selected drivers for the third annual Marrakesh rookie test. On the following day, Sacha Fenestraz was announced to join Chadwick for the rookie test. On 30 July, Jaguar announced Tom Blomqvist as its new reserve driver, after Lynn got signed to Mahindra Racing and leaving Jaguar in the process. Calado's final race for Jaguar would be the fourth Berlin race as 2020 6 Hours of Spa-Francorchamps prevented him from attending the final two races, in which the new reserve Blomqvist would take his place.

After an unsuccessful season finale in Berlin, Jaguar would only score 81 points in their campaign, finishing 7th in Teams' Championship once again.

=== 2020–21 season ===
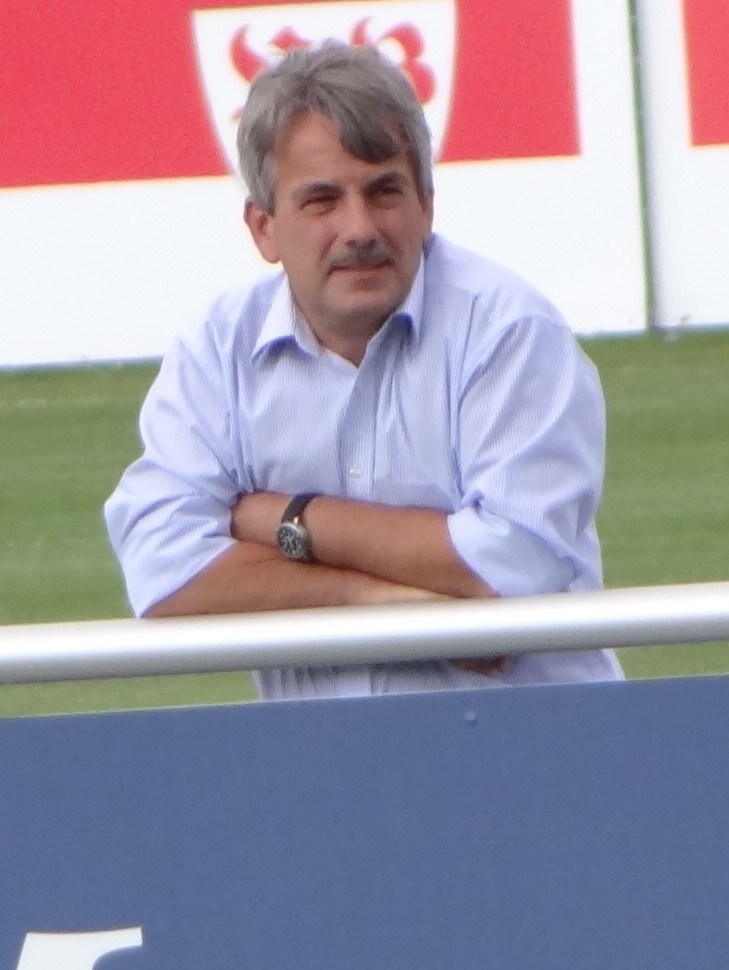
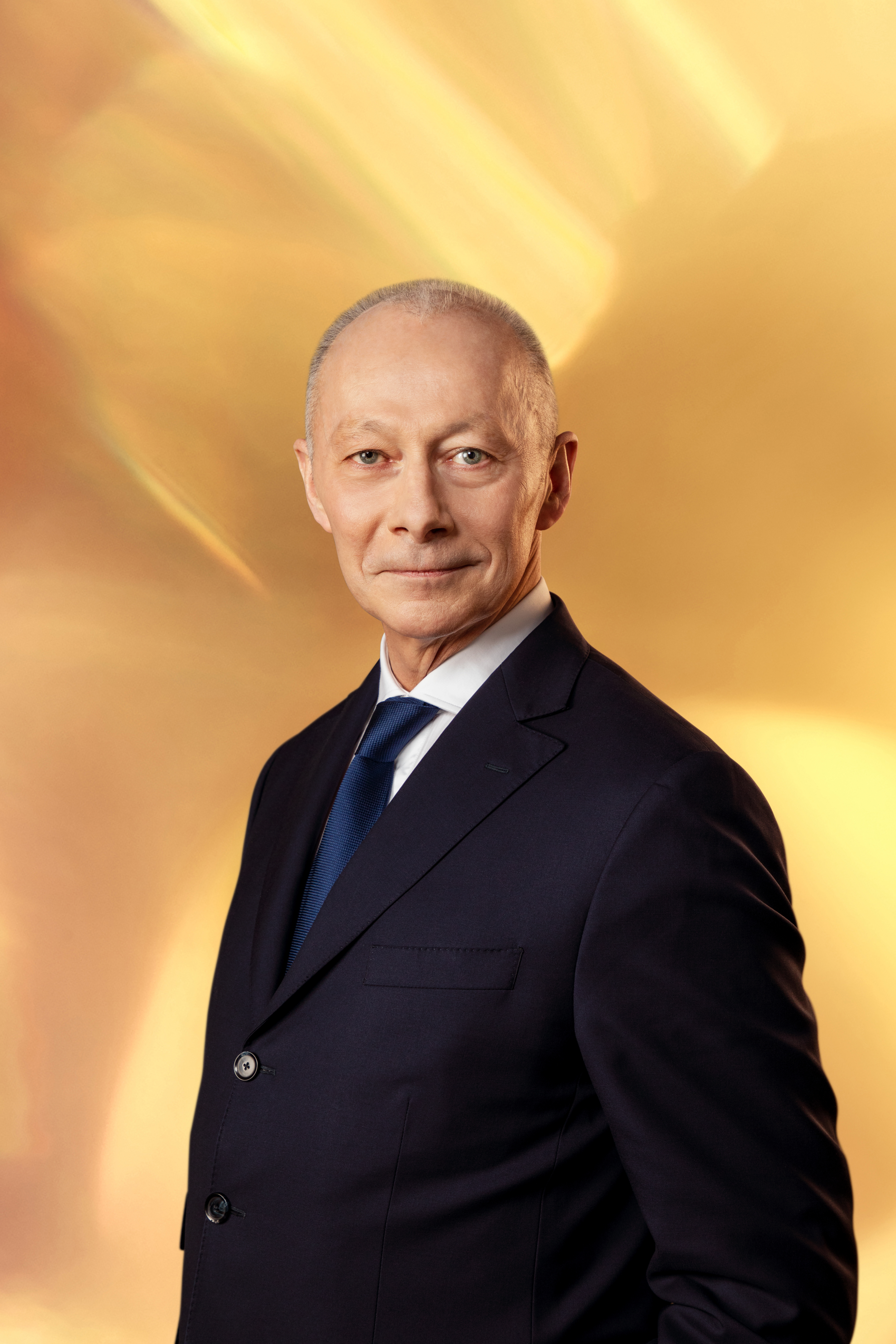
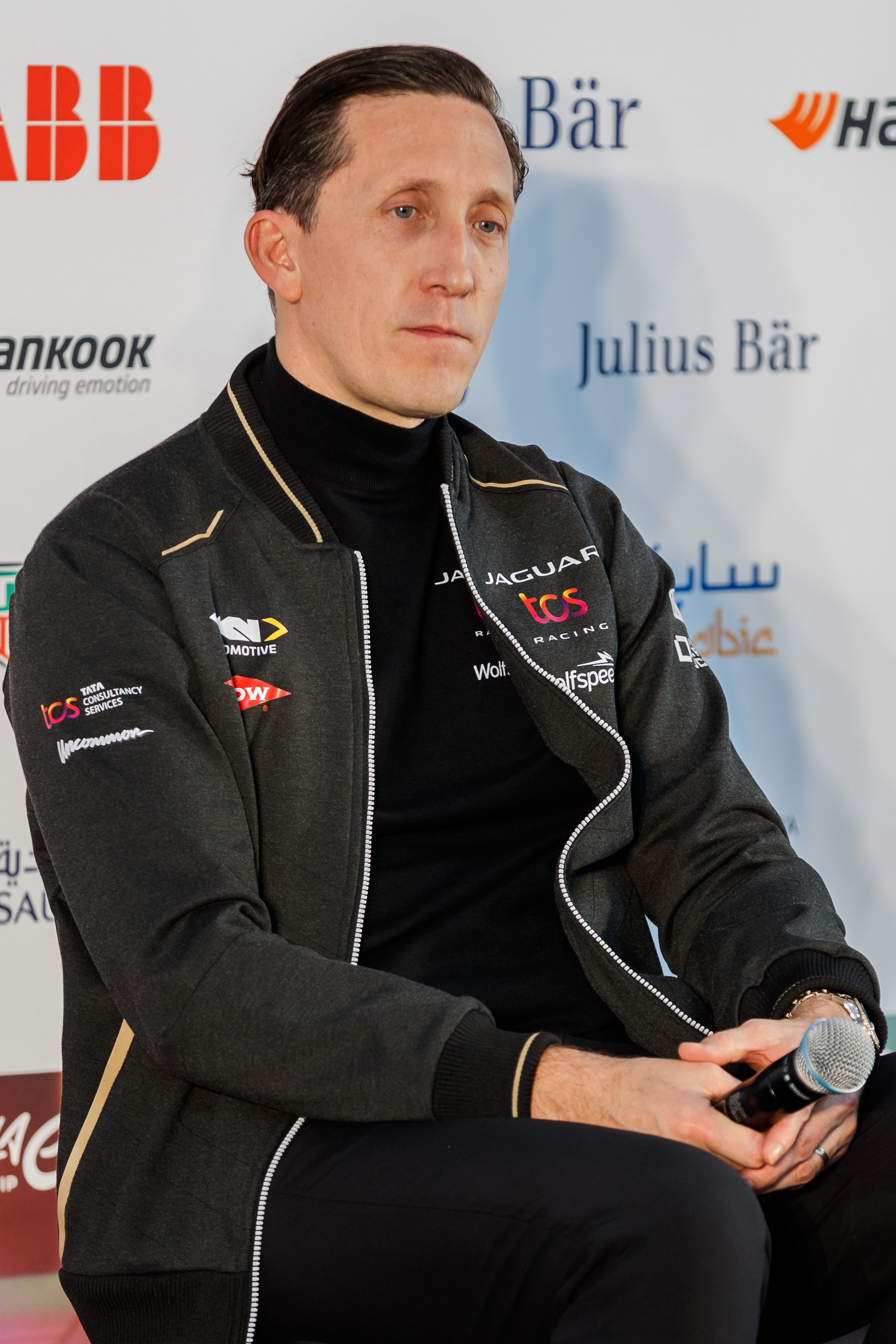
James Barclay (bottom, pictured in 2023) has been the team principal since the project started. Gerd Mäuser (top left) served as chairman between 2016 and 2021, with Thierry Bolloré (top right) replacing him in the role. Bolloré himself stepped down in 2022.

On 14 July 2020, Jaguar became the first team to announce its driver lineup for the 2020–21 season after signing Sam Bird to the team. Bird would finish the ongoing 2019–20 season with Envision Virgin Racing before completing the switch. Evans continues with the team as he signed a multi-year contract prior to the 2019–20 season. In October 2020, Jaguar unveiled the development version of the I-Type 5 car, with the team only referencing to itself as Jaguar Racing, quietly splitting with the title sponsor Panasonic. On 27 November, the team held a virtual launch of the I-Type 5 along with the drivers presentation, revealing new sponsors and announcing the car numbers. In February 2021, Sacha Fenestraz returned to the team as a reserve driver, replacing Blomqvist who joined NIO 333 as a full-time driver.

The Diriyah ePrix double-header saw the team scoring two podium finishes and two retirements. In the first race, Evans finished third after successfully defending his position over René Rast. Bird retired from the race following a collision with Alex Lynn, who was later given a penalty for the incident. In the following race, Bird won his first race in the Jaguar overalls after starting from third and successfully overtaking Dragon's Sérgio Sette Câmara at the start and later the pole-sitter Robin Frijns, his former Virgin Racing teammate. The race however ended prematurely red-flagged due to Alex Lynn being involved in a huge collision with Evans, who retired in the process. He tried to check on Lynn, who was later taken to hospital. After this race, Jaguar moved to the lead in Teams' Championship for the very first time. At the Valencia ePrix double-header, the team lost its lead in Teams' Championship as it failed to score a single point after poor qualifying performances in both races due to wet conditions in their qualifying group.

In May 2021, Tom Dillmann joined the team as a second reserve driver, returning to the sport after previously competing for Venturi and NIO. On 22 July 2021, Jaguar Land Rover formally committed to Formula E for the next set of rules which are set to keep Jaguar Racing on the grid until 2026. Then on 3 August, it was announced that Evans signed another multi-year extension with the team. Before the Berlin ePrix, it was announced that Gerd Mäuser would step down from his role as a chairman after the season with Thierry Bolloré succeeding him in the role. In their most successful season to date, Jaguar Racing finished second in Teams' Championship with 177 points, having led it on two separate occasions (the second one being before the final round), with two victories scored by Bird and further six podium finishes, five of which scored by Evans who as a result scored the most podium finishes out of anyone that season.

=== 2021–22 season ===
On 2 November 2021, the team announced their latest rebranding to Jaguar TCS Racing along with confirming the unchanged driver lineup of Bird and Evans. Thierry Bolloré was also confirmed as the team's new chairman. On 17 January 2022, Norman Nato was announced as Jaguar's new reserve and simulator driver, joining Tom Dillmann and replacing Sacha Fenestraz. On 8 February 2022, it was announced that Jaguar would become powertrain suppliers for Envision Racing over the duration of the Gen3 era of Formula E which is set to start with the 2022–23 season.

After a poor start to the season, Jaguar recovered at the Rome ePrix where Evans got a double victory. Bird was also looking for a double points finish, but he was forced to retire from the second race. At the inaugural Jakarta ePrix, Evans added another win to his resume, remaining fourth in the championship, but getting closer to his title rivals that gained advantage on him after a less successful Berlin ePrix double-header.

Bolloré stepped down as Jaguar Land Rover CEO in November 2022. With no direct replacement announced for Jaguar Racing's chairman position, Barclay would now remain the sole official authority in the team heading into the Gen3 era of Formula E.

=== 2022–23 season ===
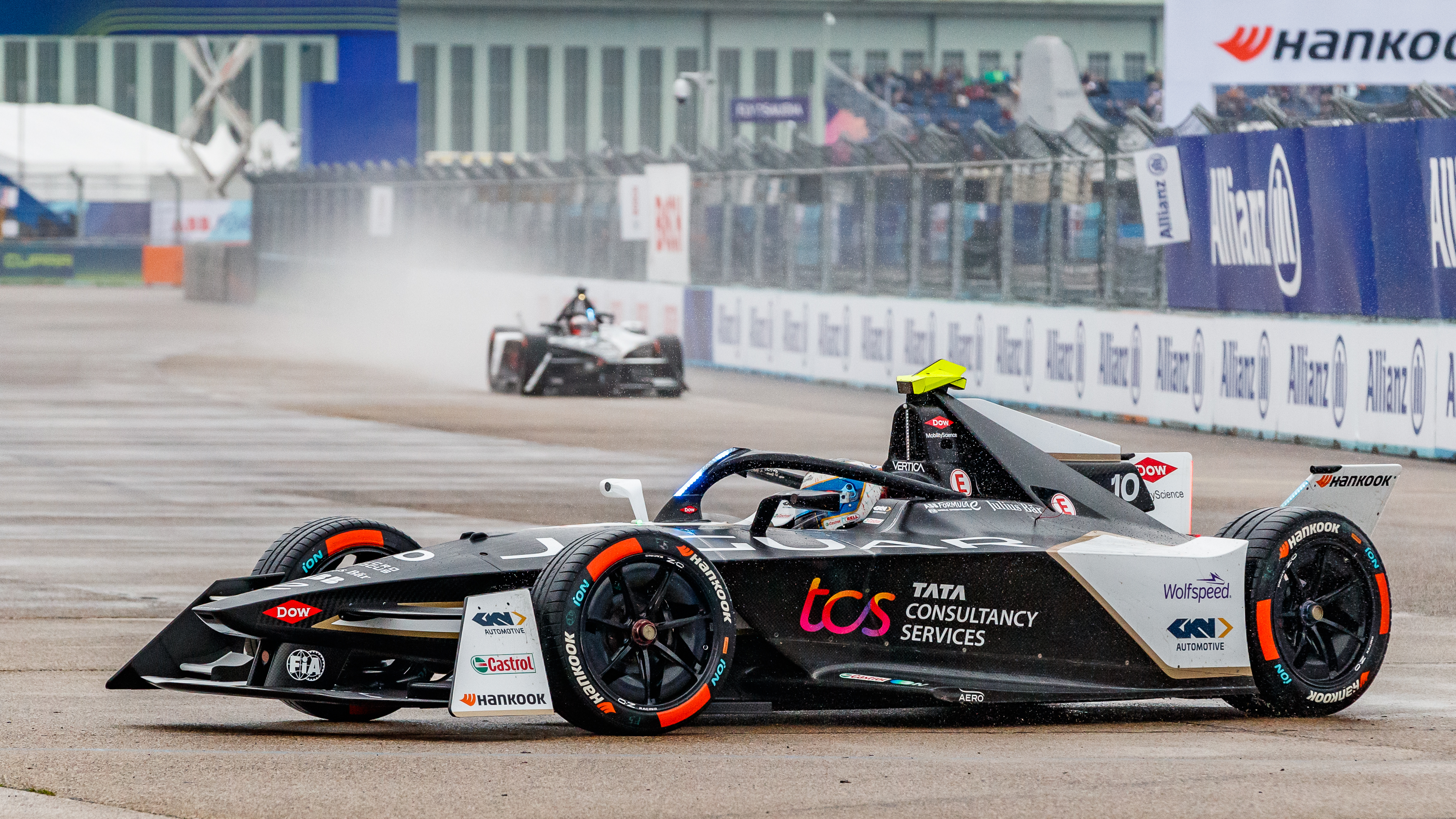
Sam Bird followed by Evans at the 2023 Berlin ePrix, where the team scored its first 1-2 finish.

Jaguar retained Evans and Bird for their Gen3 debut. The team changed its visual presentation, ditching teal in favor of white, while keeping black as primary colour. Also part of this change, the new I-Type 6 cars would also run asymmetric liveries. Jaguar had a troublesome season opener in Mexico City. Bird was suffering from technical issues throughout the whole weekend and had to retire early into the race. Evans, despite crashing after the first free practice due to a different unspecified problem, finished the race in eighth position. Further drama came at the inaugural Hyderabad ePrix, where Bird collided with Evans after unsuccessfully attempting an overtake on Sacha Fenestraz, taking both him and Evans out of the race.

Jaguar-powered cars were initially uncompetitive against Porsche-powered teams in race conditions (despite having a superior one-lap pace), but slowly took over, scoring several poles, podium finishes and wins since, splitting them between the factory drivers of Evans and Bird and the customer Envision Racing driver lineup of Nick Cassidy and Sébastien Buemi, who became Jaguar's biggest title rivals in the process. Jaguar lost the teams' title by 12 points to Envision; Evans secured the third in the drivers' championship.

=== 2023–24 season ===
On 12 January 2024, it was announced that Joel Eriksson and Tom Dillmann would both remain as test, reserve, and simulator drivers for the 2023–24 season. Meanwhile, Nick Cassidy would replace Bird to partner Evans. The team experienced their best season to date, as two wins from each of their drivers would put them on the brink of winning all three titles come the final round in London. Whilst their results would be enough to win both the teams' championship and, along with customer team Envision, the newly-formed manufacturers' trophy, a puncture for Cassidy and a late attack mode miss from Evans meant that Jaguar missed out on the drivers' title to Pascal Wehrlein, with Evans and Cassidy ending up second and third respectively.

=== 2024–25 season ===
For the 2024-25 season TCR Jaguar retained their lineup of Nick Cassidy and Mitch Evans. Due to a cost cap penalty in the 2022-23 season, Jaguar (along with Nissan) was forced to miss the first day of pre season testing. However, driver Mitch Evans still set the fastest time of the test with a 1:27.461 while teammate Cassidy was the 11th fastest.

=== Sponsors ===
Sponsor (Note: This list only includes companies whose logos have appeared on the team's cars. Mandatory logos of series' partners are also excluded from the list.)	2016–17	2017–18	2018–19	2019–20	2020–21	2021–22	2022–23	2023-24	2024-25	2025–26	2026–27
Panasonic	Yes T	Yes T	Yes T	Yes T	No	No	No	No	No	No	No
Tata Consultancy Services (Note: Including a parent company in Tata Group.)	No	No	No	No	No	Yes T	Yes T	Yes T	Yes T	Yes T	Yes T
Lear Corporation E-Systems	Yes	No	No	No	No	No	No	No	No	No	No
Gorillaz	Yes	No	No	No	No	No	No	No	No	No	No
GKN	No	Yes	Yes	Yes	Yes	Yes	Yes	No	No	No	No
Viessmann	No	Yes	Yes	Yes	Yes	No	No	No	No	No	No
Castrol (Note: Including a sub-brand in Castrol ON (2021–present).)	No	No	No	Yes	Yes	Yes	Yes	Yes	Yes	Yes	Yes
DR1VA	No	No	No	No	Yes	No	No	No	No	No	No
Dow MobilityScience	No	No	No	No	Yes	Yes	Yes	Yes	Yes	Yes	Yes
IQONIQ	No	No	No	No	Yes	No	No	No	No	No	No
Micro Focus (Note: Including a subsidiary in Vertica.) / OpenText (Note: From 2023 onwards, after OpenText acquired Micro Focus.)	No	No	No	No	No	Yes	Yes	Yes	No	No	No
Wolfspeed	No	No	No	No	No	No	Yes	Yes	Yes	No	No
Aero	No	No	No	No	No	No	Yes	Yes	Yes	No	No
Google Cloud	No	No	No	No	No	No	No	No	Yes	No	No
Chase Bank	No	No	No	No	No	No	No	No	No	Yes	Yes
Fortescue Zero (Elysia Battery Intelligence)	No	No	No	No	No	No	No	No	No	No	Yes

Past logos
2016–2020

2020–2021

2021–2024

== I-Pace eTrophy ==
For the 2018–19 season, Jaguar Racing launched a support series for Formula E, dubbed the Jaguar I-PACE eTROPHY. The series operated an 'Arrive and Drive' package for up to 20 drivers at each race, including a different VIP driver at every venue. The series would be cancelled after the 2019–20 season due to the COVID-19 pandemic.

== Complete Formula E results ==
(key) (results in bold indicate pole position; results in italics indicate fastest lap)

Year	Chassis	Powertrain	Tyres	No.	Drivers	1	2	3	4	5	6	7	8	9	10	11	12	13	14	15	16	17	Points	T.C.
Panasonic Jaguar Racing
2016–17	Spark SRT01-e	Jaguar I-Type 1	M			HKG	MRK	BUE	MEX	MCO	PAR	BER		NYC		MTL							27	10th
2016–17	Spark SRT01-e	Jaguar I-Type 1	M	20	(New Zealand) Mitch Evans	Ret	17	13	4	10	9	Ret	17	Ret	Ret	7	12						27	10th
2016–17	Spark SRT01-e	Jaguar I-Type 1	M	47	(United Kingdom) Adam Carroll	12	14	17	8	14	15	14	16	10	11	16	14						27	10th
2017–18	Spark SRT01-e	Jaguar I-Type 2	M			HKG		MRK	SCL	MEX	PDE	RME	PAR	BER	ZUR	NYC							119	6th
2017–18	Spark SRT01-e	Jaguar I-Type 2	M	3	(Brazil) Nelson Piquet Jr.	4	12	4	6	4	Ret	Ret	Ret	12	Ret	Ret	7						119	6th
2017–18	Spark SRT01-e	Jaguar I-Type 2	M	20	(New Zealand) Mitch Evans	12	3	11	7	6	4	9	15	6	**7**	Ret	6						119	6th
2018–19	Spark SRT05e	Jaguar I-Type 3	M			ADR	MRK	SCL	MEX	HKG	SYX	RME	PAR	MCO	BER	BRN	NYC						116	7th
2018–19	Spark SRT05e	Jaguar I-Type 3	M	3	(Brazil) Nelson Piquet Jr.	10	14	11	Ret	Ret	Ret												116	7th
2018–19	Spark SRT05e	Jaguar I-Type 3	M	3	(United Kingdom) Alex Lynn							12	Ret	8	Ret	7	Ret	16					116	7th
2018–19	Spark SRT05e	Jaguar I-Type 3	M	20	(New Zealand) Mitch Evans	4	9	6	7	7	9	1	16	6	12	2	2	17					116	7th
2019–20	Spark SRT05e	Jaguar I-Type 4	M			DIR		SCL	MEX	MRK	BER		BER		BER								81	7th
2019–20	Spark SRT05e	Jaguar I-Type 4	M	20	(New Zealand) Mitch Evans	10	18	**3**^{G}	1^{G}	6	14	12	9	7	7	11							81	7th
2019–20	Spark SRT05e	Jaguar I-Type 4	M	51	(United Kingdom) James Calado	16	7	8	DSQ	16	16	20	Ret	17									81	7th
2019–20	Spark SRT05e	Jaguar I-Type 4	M	51	(United Kingdom) Tom Blomqvist										12	17							81	7th
Jaguar Racing
2020–21	Spark SRT05e	Jaguar I-Type 5	M			DIR		RME		VLC		MCO	PUE		NYC		LDN		BER	BER			177	2nd
2020–21	Spark SRT05e	Jaguar I-Type 5	M	10	(United Kingdom) Sam Bird	Ret	1	2	Ret	DSQ	14	7	Ret	12	9	**1**^{G}	Ret	Ret	Ret	7			177	2nd
2020–21	Spark SRT05e	Jaguar I-Type 5	M	20	(New Zealand) Mitch Evans	3	Ret	3	6	Ret	15	3	8	9	Ret	13	14	3	3	Ret			177	2nd
Jaguar TCS Racing
2021–22	Spark SRT05e	Jaguar I-Type 5	M			DRH		MEX	RME		MCO	BER		JAK	MRK	NYC		LDN		SEO			231	4th
2021–22	Spark SRT05e	Jaguar I-Type 5	M	9	(New Zealand) Mitch Evans	10	21	19	1	1	**2**	5	10	1	3	11	3	5	Ret	1	7		231	4th
2021–22	Spark SRT05e	Jaguar I-Type 5	M	10	(United Kingdom) Sam Bird	4	15	15	5	Ret	Ret	7	11	10	9	7	5	Ret	8				231	4th
2021–22	Spark SRT05e	Jaguar I-Type 5	M	10	(France) Norman Nato															13	14		231	4th
2022–23	Spark Gen3	Jaguar I-Type 6	H			MEX	DRH		HYD	CPT	SPL	BER		MCO	JAK		PRT	RME		LDN			292	2nd
2022–23	Spark Gen3	Jaguar I-Type 6	H	9	(New Zealand) Mitch Evans	8	10	7	**Ret**	11	1	1	4	2	Ret	3	4	**1**	Ret	**1**	2		292	2nd
2022–23	Spark Gen3	Jaguar I-Type 6	H	10	(United Kingdom) Sam Bird	Ret	3	4	Ret	WD	3	2	19	16	20†	DNS	17	Ret	3	4	7		292	2nd
2023–24	Spark Gen3	Jaguar I-Type 6	H			MEX	DIR		SAP	TOK	MIS		MCO	BER		SHA		POR		LDN			368	1st
2023–24	Spark Gen3	Jaguar I-Type 6	H	9	(New Zealand) Mitch Evans	5	5	10	2	15	5	NC	1	4	6	1	5	8	3	**2**	3		368	1st
2023–24	Spark Gen3	Jaguar I-Type 6	H	37	(New Zealand) Nick Cassidy	3	3	1	Ret	8	Ret	3	2	1	2	3	4	19	13	7	**Ret**		368	1st
2024–25	Formula E Gen3 Evo	Jaguar I-Type 7	H			SAP	MEX	JED		MIA	MCO		TKO		SHA		JAK	BER		LDN			227	2nd
2024–25	Formula E Gen3 Evo	Jaguar I-Type 7	H	9	(New Zealand) Mitch Evans	1	Ret	19	Ret	16	20	18	Ret	DNS	20	14	12	**1**	5	**10**	5		227	2nd
2024–25	Formula E Gen3 Evo	Jaguar I-Type 7	H	37	(New Zealand) Nick Cassidy	15	12	11	5	15	18	3	10	7	21	**1**	6	5	1	1	1		227	2nd
2025–26	Formula E Gen3 Evo	Jaguar I-Type 7	H			SAP	MEX	MIA	JED		MAD	BER		MCO		SYX	SHA		TKO		LDN		288	1st
2025–26	Formula E Gen3 Evo	Jaguar I-Type 7	H	9	(New Zealand) Mitch Evans	Ret	11	1	3	7	2	6	1	2	4	Ret	8	DNS	4	Ret	8	4	288	1st
2025–26	Formula E Gen3 Evo	Jaguar I-Type 7	H	13	(Portugal) António Félix da Costa	11	Ret	8	5	1	1	10	18	Ret	3	4	2	14	9	14	3	15	288	1st

Notes

- ^{G} – Driver was fastest in group qualifying stage and was given one championship point.
- † – Driver did not finish the race, but was classified as he completed over 90% of the race distance.
- * – Season still in progress.

=== Other teams supplied by Jaguar ===
Year	Team	Chassis	Powertrain	Tyres	No.	Drivers	Points	T.C.	Source
2022–23	(United Kingdom) Envision Racing	Spark Gen3	Jaguar I-Type 6	H	No.	Drivers	304	1st	
2022–23	(United Kingdom) Envision Racing	Spark Gen3	Jaguar I-Type 6	H	16	(Switzerland) Sébastien Buemi	304	1st	
2022–23	(United Kingdom) Envision Racing	Spark Gen3	Jaguar I-Type 6	H	37	(New Zealand) Nick Cassidy	304	1st	
2023–24	(United Kingdom) Envision Racing	Spark Gen3	Jaguar I-Type 6	H					
2023–24	(United Kingdom) Envision Racing	Spark Gen3	Jaguar I-Type 6	H	4	(Netherlands) Robin Frijns	121	6th	
2023–24	(United Kingdom) Envision Racing	Spark Gen3	Jaguar I-Type 6	H	4	(Sweden) Joel Eriksson	121	6th	
2023–24	(United Kingdom) Envision Racing	Spark Gen3	Jaguar I-Type 6	H	16	(Switzerland) Sébastien Buemi	121	6th	
2023–24	(United Kingdom) Envision Racing	Spark Gen3	Jaguar I-Type 6	H	16	(Estonia) Paul Aron	121	6th	
2024–25	(United Kingdom) Envision Racing	Spark Gen3 Evo	Jaguar I-Type 7	H					
2024–25	(United Kingdom) Envision Racing	Spark Gen3 Evo	Jaguar I-Type 7	H	4	(Netherlands) Robin Frijns	107	8th	
2024–25	(United Kingdom) Envision Racing	Spark Gen3 Evo	Jaguar I-Type 7	H	16	(Switzerland) Sébastien Buemi	107	8th	
2025–26	(United Kingdom) Envision Racing	Spark Gen3 Evo	Jaguar I-Type 7	H			107	8th	
2025–26	(United Kingdom) Envision Racing	Spark Gen3 Evo	Jaguar I-Type 7	H	14	(Sweden) Joel Eriksson	152	7th	
2025–26	(United Kingdom) Envision Racing	Spark Gen3 Evo	Jaguar I-Type 7	H	16	(Switzerland) Sébastien Buemi	152	7th	

== See also ==
- Jaguar Cars
- Jaguar in motorsport
