= Portland International Raceway =

Motorsport track in the United States

- Grand Prix Circuit (2008–present)
- Location: Portland, Oregon, United States
- Coordinates: 45°35′49″N 122°41′45″W
- Capacity: 30,000
- FIA Grade: 2
- Owner: City of Portland
- Broke ground: 1960
- Opened: June 1961; 65 years ago
- Major events: Current: IndyCar Series; OnlyBulls Grand Prix of Portland (1984–2007, 2018–2019, 2021–present); ARCA Menards Series West; Portland 112 (1986, 2009–2012, 2021–present); Future: Trans-Am West Coast Championship (2017–2019, 2021–2025, 2027); Former: Formula E Portland ePrix (2023–2024); NASCAR Xfinity Series; Pacific Office Automation 147 (2022–2025); IMSA; Portland Grand Prix (1978–1994, 1999–2001, 2004–2006); Pirelli World Challenge; Rose Cup Races (2001, 2004–2005, 2018–2019); Trans-Am Series (1972, 1975–1987, 1990–1995, 2001, 2004–2005, 2009); NASCAR Craftsman Truck Series; Line-X 225 (1999–2000); AMA Superbike Championship (1983–1984)
- Website: portlandraceway.com

Grand Prix Circuit (2008–present)
- Surface: Asphalt/concrete
- Length: 1.967 mi (3.166 km)
- Turns: 12
- Race lap record: 0:58.7403 ( (Colombia) Carlos Muñoz, Dallara IR-18, 2018, IndyCar)

Formula E Circuit (2023–2024)
- Surface: Asphalt/concrete
- Length: 2.001 mi (3.221 km)
- Turns: 12
- Race lap record: 1:10.650 ( (Netherlands) Robin Frijns, Jaguar I-Type 6, 2024, F-E)

Grand Prix Circuit (1992–2007)
- Surface: Asphalt/concrete
- Length: 1.944 mi (3.129 km)
- Turns: 12
- Race lap record: 0.59.259 ( (Australia) Will Power, Lola B02/00, 2006, Champ Car)

Grand Prix Circuit (1984–1991)
- Surface: Asphalt/concrete
- Length: 1.922 mi (3.093 km)
- Turns: 12
- Race lap record: 0:57.626 ( (South Africa) Wayne Taylor, Intrepid RM-1, 1991, IMSA GTP)

Grand Prix Circuit (1971–1983)
- Surface: Asphalt/concrete
- Length: 1.915 mi (3.082 km)
- Turns: 9
- Race lap record: 1:04.860 ( (United Kingdom) John Fitzpatrick, Porsche 935 K4, 1982, IMSA GTP)

Full Circuit (1969–1970)
- Surface: Asphalt/concrete
- Length: 1.799 mi (2.896 km)
- Turns: 9

West Delta Park Circuit (1966–1968)
- Surface: Asphalt/concrete
- Length: 1.964 mi (3.160 km)
- Turns: 11

West Delta Park Circuit (1961–1965)
- Surface: Asphalt/concrete
- Length: 1.999 mi (3.217 km)
- Turns: 11

Portland International Raceway (PIR) is a motorsport facility located in Portland, Oregon, United States. It is part of the Delta Park complex on the former site of Vanport, just south of the Columbia River. It lies west of the Delta Park/Vanport light rail station and less than a mile west of Interstate 5.

== The track ==
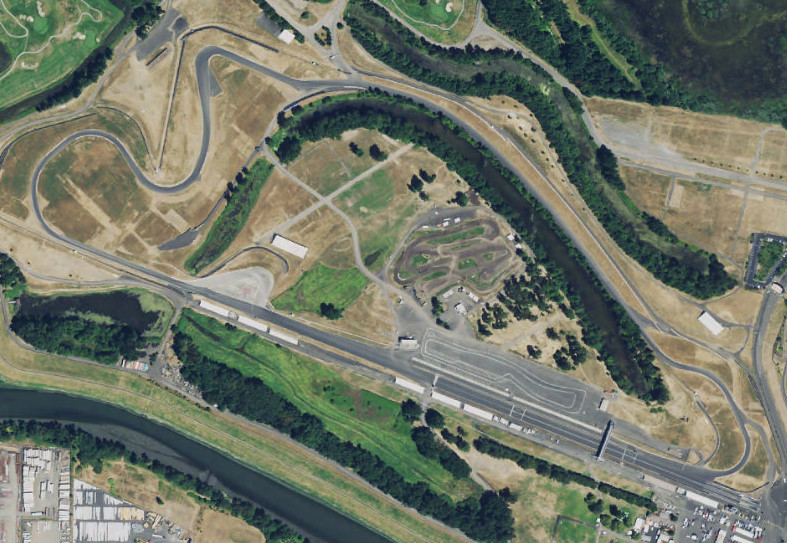
Portland International Raceway via USGS satellite imagery

The track hosts the IndyCar Series, ICSCC and SCCA and OMRRA road racing, the ARCA Menards Series West, and SCCA autocross events. Additionally, the PIR grounds are host to OBRA (Oregon Bicycle Racing Association) bicycling races on the track and the surrounding grounds. The facility includes a dragstrip and a motocross track.

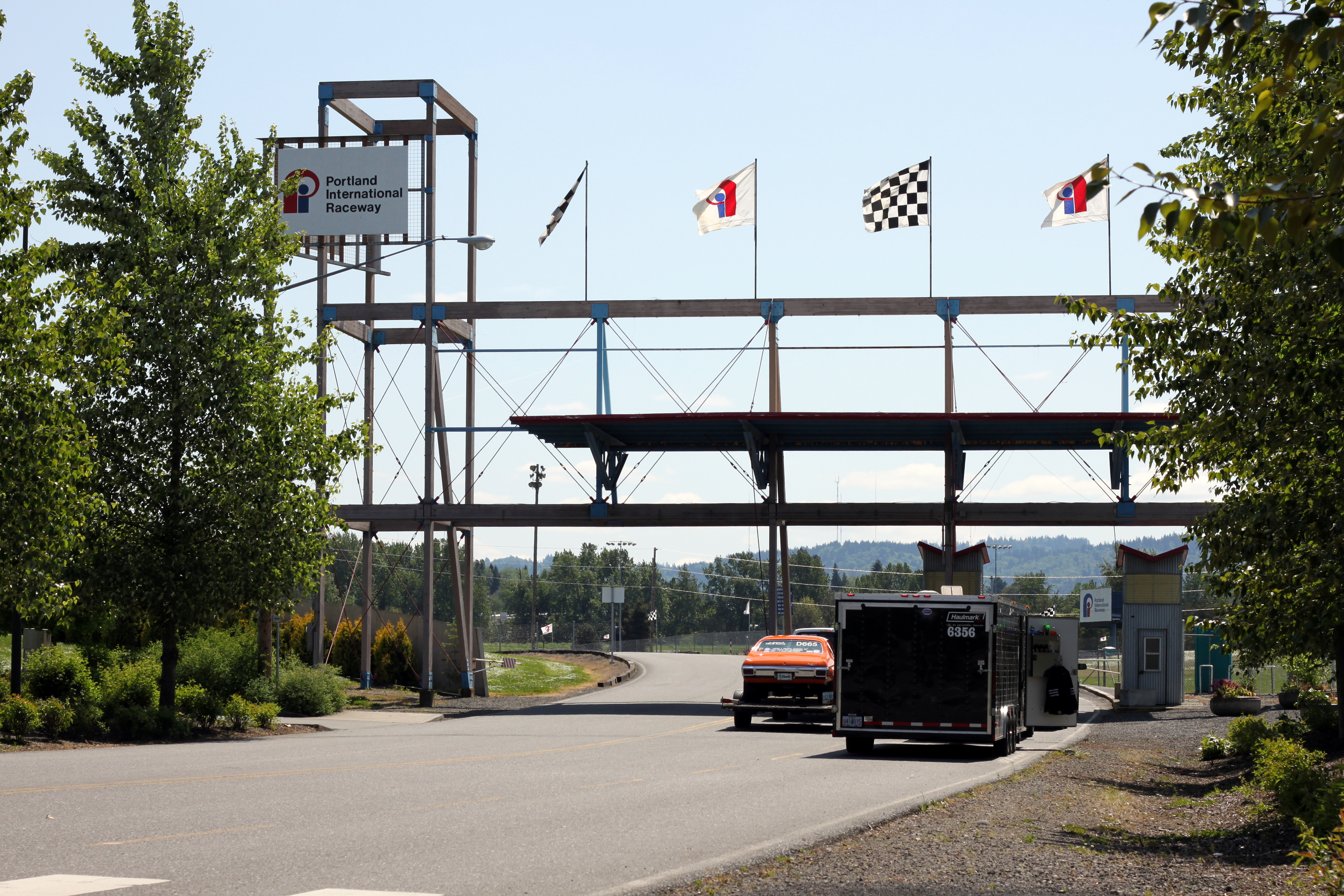
Entrance to Portland International Raceway

The road course is almost perfectly flat and runs clockwise. Two track configurations are possible. The modern Grand Prix circuit includes a hard chicane at the end of the front straight, referred to as the "Shelton Chicane" in honor of Vanport racing legend Monte Shelton, and involves 12 turns at a length of 1.967 mi (3.166 km). Without the chicane, the track has nine turns and a lap length of 1.915 mi (3.082 km). Portland is classified as an FIA Grade Two circuit.

PIR boasts a Winners' List starring some of the most accomplished open-wheel drivers of all time including Mario Andretti (1985–1986), Emerson Fittipaldi (1989), Michael Andretti (1990–1992), Bobby Rahal (1987), Sébastien Bourdais (2004, 2007), Will Power (2019, 2024–2025), and Álex Palou (2021, 2023).

The City of Portland is working to establish the track as carbon neutral. In 2023, an investigation revealed the use of leaded gasoline at the track, which may pose significant health risks for spectators and residents near the track. This occurs primarily during drag races, as unleaded fuel (often alcohol based) is used in major weekends.

== History ==
PIR is built on the former location of Vanport, Oregon, which was destroyed on Memorial Day, May 30, 1948, when a railroad berm broke and water from the Columbia River flooded the city. After the flood, all that remained were the paved streets and concrete foundations of destroyed buildings.

The first races took place on these old city streets in 1961 during the Portland Rose Festival. Since then, the Rose Cup has become an annual event. Racing at "West Delta Park", as PIR was known back then, was quite dangerous. Racers leaving the track unexpectedly could collide with leftover concrete foundations or fall into ponds.

Under the threat of losing the Rose Cup races, since many of the sanctioning racing bodies would no longer sanction races due to the deteriorating roads and dangerous obstacles, the track was finally paved in the 1970s.

In 1975, Portland International hosted the Trans-Am Series, the premier series of the Sports Car Club of America, which was won by John Greenwood, driving a Chevrolet Corvette. Greenwood would go on to win the 1975 Trans-Am Series Championship.

Beginning in 1984, Portland International began hosting the cars and stars of the PPG Indycar World Series, with Al Unser Jr. taking his first win, driving a Cosworth powered March.

Portland is best-remembered as being the site of two of the closest finishes on a road course in Indy car racing history. In 1986, Michael Andretti lost fuel pressure on the final turn of the final lap, which allowed his father Mario to catch up and beat him to the finish line by 0.070 seconds. At the time, it was the closest finish of any race in Indy car history. In 1997, in a three-wide finish, Mark Blundell beat second place Gil de Ferran by 0.027 seconds, and beat third place Raul Boesel by 0.055 seconds. For a road course race, it was the all-time closest finish in CART series history, as well as the closest three-car finish in series history.

In 1999 and 2000, the NASCAR Craftsman Truck Series ran a race at Portland International Raceway. The race was added after the demise of the ½-mile Portland Speedway that hosted races early in the series. The 1999 running saw the first (and as of 2021, the only) time there were more than one African-Americans competing in the same NASCAR top-three division race, with Bill Lester and Bobby Norfleet on the grid.

At the end of 2007 and the beginning of 2008, PIR went through a track renovation. The track was repaved with new asphalt and some minor changes were made to the track layout. Turns 4-7 were widened. The fence on the inside of turn 6 was moved to provide a better sightline through the corner. Turn 7 was sharpened to slow down racers prior to entering the back straight. Formula One-style curbs were also installed on the track. The track reopened on February 23, 2008, with a ribbon cutting ceremony.

In September 2018, the Grand Prix of Portland returned after an 11-year hiatus, now an IndyCar Series race. The qualifying record is 0:57.3467, set by Will Power during the 2018 Grand Prix of Portland. Will Power (2019, 2024) and Álex Palou (2021, 2023) have each won twice since the race returned to the calendar.

On September 29, 2021, it was announced that the NASCAR Xfinity Series would race there in the regular season.

On December 8, 2022, it was announced that Formula E would race at PIR with a slightly modified layout in the 2022–23 season instead of Brooklyn Street Circuit. Nick Cassidy won the inaugural Portland ePrix in June 2023, and António Félix da Costa won both races in June 2024.

== Events ==
Current

- April: International Conference of Sports Car Clubs Rose City Opener
- May: SCCA Super Tour
- June: International Conference of Sports Car Clubs Dash for Kids
- August: IndyCar Series Grand Prix of Portland, ARCA Menards Series West Portland 112, Indy NXT, USF Pro 2000 Championship, USF2000 Championship
- September: International Conference of Sports Car Clubs Chicane Challenge, Formula Car Challenge, International Conference of Sports Car Clubs Festival of Endurance

Future

- USF Juniors (2024–2025, 2027)
- Trans-Am West Coast Championship (2017–2019, 2021–2025, 2027)

Former

- AMA Superbike Championship (1983–1984)
- American Le Mans Series
  - Portland Grand Prix (1999–2001, 2004–2006)
- Atlantic Championship Series (1984–1988, 2002–2007)
- Barber Pro Series (1987–1991, 1999, 2002–2003)
- Champ Car World Series
  - Grand Prix of Portland (1984–2007)
- Ferrari Challenge North America (2006)
- FIA Formula E World Championship
  - Portland ePrix (2023–2024)
- IMSA GT Championship
  - Portland Grand Prix (1978–1994)
- IMSA GT3 Cup Challenge (2005)
- Pirelli World Challenge
  - Rose Cup Races (2001, 2004–2005, 2018–2019)
- Mazda MX-5 Cup (2004–2008, 2018–2019)
- NASCAR Craftsman Truck Series
  - Grainger Industrial Supply 225K (1999–2000)
- NASCAR Northwest Series (1995–1998, 2000–2001)
- NASCAR Xfinity Series
  - Pacific Office Automation 147 (2022–2025)
- North American Touring Car Championship (1995–1997)
- Stadium Super Trucks (2019)
- Trans-Am Series (1972, 1975–1987, 1990–1995, 2001, 2004–2005, 2009)

== Lap records ==
The unofficial outright all-time lap record set during a race weekend is 0:55.760 seconds, set by Wayne Taylor on the old circuit layout, in an Intrepid RM-1-Chevrolet, during qualifying for the 1991 G.I. Joe's/Camel Grand Prix Presented by Nissan. As of August 2026, the fastest official race lap records at Portland International Raceway are listed as:

Category	Time	Driver	Vehicle	Event
Grand Prix Circuit (2008–present): 1.967 mi (3.166 km)
IndyCar	0:58.7403	Carlos Muñoz	Dallara IR-18	2018 Grand Prix of Portland
Indy NXT	1:02.8861	Nolan Siegel	Dallara IL-15	2023 Portland Indy NXT round
Indy Pro 2000	1:07.1597	Rinus VeeKay	Tatuus PM-18	2018 Pro Mazda Grand Prix of Portland
GT3	1:10.791	Miguel Molina	Ferrari 488 GT3	2018 Portland SprintX GT Championship round
USF2000	1:11.1947	Thomas Schrage	Tatuus USF-22	2025 USF2000 Grand Prix of Portland
TA1	1:13.574	Greg Pickett	Ford Mustang Trans-Am	2019 Portland Trans-Am West Coast round
Barber Pro	1:14.122	Leonardo Maia	Reynard 98E	2003 Portland Barber Pro round
NASCAR Xfinity	1:14.552	Connor Zilisch	Chevrolet Camaro SS	2025 Pacific Office Automation 147
TA2	1:14.702	Brody Goble	Ford Mustang Trans-Am	2025 Portland Trans-Am West Coast round
USF Juniors	1:15.0871	Ariel Elkin	Tatuus JR-23	2024 Continental Tire Grand Prix of Portland
ARCA Menards	1:17.367	Sam Corry	Toyota Camry	2026 Portland 112
GT4	1:17.660	Christian Szymczak	Mercedes-AMG GT4	2019 Portland GT4 America round
TCR Touring Car	1:18.770	Michael James Lewis	Hyundai i30 N TCR	2018 Portland Pirelli World Challenge round
Mazda MX-5 Cup	1:25.3537	Michael Carter	Mazda MX-5 (ND)	2019 Portland Mazda MX-5 Cup round
Grand Prix Circuit without Chicane (2008–present): 1.967 mi (3.166 km)
ARCA Menards	1:11.570	William Sawalich	Toyota Camry	2025 Portland 112
Formula E Circuit (2023–2024): 2.001 mi (3.220 km)
Formula E	1:10.650	Robin Frijns	Jaguar I-Type 6	2024 Portland ePrix
Grand Prix Circuit (1992–2007): 1.944 mi (3.129 km)
Champ Car	0:59.259	Will Power	Lola B02/00	2006 Grand Prix of Portland
CART	1:00.801	Bruno Junqueira	Lola B02/00	2002 G.I. Joe's 200
IMSA GTP	1:02.067	P. J. Jones	Eagle MkIII	1992 G.I. Joe's/Camel Grand Prix Presented by Nissan
LMP1	1:04.271	Andy Wallace	MG-Lola EX257	2005 Portland Grand Prix
LMP2	1:04.488	Lucas Luhr	Porsche RS Spyder	2006 Portland Grand Prix
LMP900	1:04.909	Emanuele Pirro	Audi R8	2000 Rose City Grand Prix
LMP	1:05.451	J.J. Lehto	BMW V12 LMR	1999 Rose City Grand Prix
Formula Atlantic	1:05.680	Joe D´Agostino	Swift 016.a	2006 Portland Formula Atlantic round
Indy Lights	1:06.572	Greg Moore	Lola T93/20	1995 Portland Indy Lights round
GT1 (GTS)	1:08.595	Oliver Gavin	Chevrolet Corvette C6.R	2005 Portland Grand Prix
LMP675	1:09.394	Didier de Radigues	Reynard 01Q	2001 Grand Prix of Portland
WSC	1:09.595	Fermin Velez	Ferrari 333 SP	1994 Grand Prix of Portland
IMSA GTP Lights	1:10.849	Parker Johnstone	Spice SE91P	1992 G.I. Joe's/Camel Grand Prix Presented by Nissan
IMSA GTS	1:11.475	Darin Brassfield	Oldsmobile Cutlass	1993 G.I. Joe's/Camel Grand Prix
GT2 (GTS)	1:12.219	Olivier Beretta	Dodge Viper GTS-R	1999 Rose City Grand Prix
GT2	1:12.931	Jaime Melo	Ferrari F430 GTC	2006 Portland Grand Prix
Trans-Am	1:13.992	Scott Pruett	Chevrolet Camaro	1994 Portland Trans-Am round
GT	1:14.392	Boris Said	BMW M3 GTR	2001 Grand Prix of Portland
IMSA GTO	1:14.613	Brian DeVries	Oldsmobile Cutlass	1993 G.I. Joe's/Camel Grand Prix
IMSA GTU	1:17.355	John Fergus	Dodge Daytona	1992 G.I. Joe's Camel Gran Prix Presented by Nissan
Super Touring	1:20.227	Randy Pobst	Honda Accord	1996 Portland NATCC round
Grand Prix Circuit (1984–1991): 1.922 mi (3.093 km)
IMSA GTP	0:57.626	Wayne Taylor	Intrepid RM-1	1991 G.I. Joe's/Camel Grand Prix
CART	1:00.058	Michael Andretti	Lola T91/00	1991 Budweiser/G.I.Joe's 200
IMSA GTO	1:02.772	Dorsey Schroeder	Ford Mustang	1991 G.I. Joe's/Camel Grand Prix
IMSA GTP Lights	1:03.495	Ruggero Melgrati	Spice SE89P	1991 G.I. Joe's/Camel Grand Prix
IMSA AAC	1:07.996	Tommy Riggins	Oldsmobile Cutlass	1991 G.I. Joe's/Camel Grand Prix
IMSA GTU	1:08.872	John Fergus	Dodge Daytona	1991 G.I. Joe's/Camel Grand Prix
Trans-Am	1:11.090	Greg Pickett	Mercury Capri	1984 Portland 200
Grand Prix Circuit (1971–1983): 1.915 mi (3.082 km)
IMSA GTP	1:04.860	John Fitzpatrick	Porsche 935 K4	1982 G.I. Joe's/Toyota Grand Prix
IMSA GTX	1:06.140	John Paul Jr.	Lola T600	1981 G.I. Joe's/Camel Grand Prix
TO	1:08.170	John Paul	Porsche 935 JLP-1	1979 Portland Trans-Am round
IMSA GTO	1:10.540	Don Devendorf	Nissan 280ZX Turbo	1982 G.I. Joe's/Toyota Grand Prix
Group 4	1:11.920	Dave Cowart	BMW M1	1981 G.I. Joe's/Camel Grand Prix
IMSA GTU	1:13.780	Bob Bergstrom	Porsche 924 Carrera GTR	1983 G.I. Joe's Grand Prix
TU	1:21.330	Lee Midgley	Alfa Romeo GTV	1972 Portland Trans-Am round

== Lead contamination ==
40% of races at the Portland International Raceway use leaded gasoline. The urban location of the track, near the Portsmouth, Kenton and Piedmont neighborhoods, has raised concerns about the potential for the Raceway to contribute to lead poisoning of nearby residents and a movement to end the use of leaded fuels at the Raceway. Testing conducted at PIR indicated that concentrations of lead in public areas could not conclusively be determined by traffic on the Raceway since the track sits next to heavy highway traffic and industrial complexes. The dissipation of leaded fuels before reaching the general attendees coupled with ever-efficient modern engines minimized any significant health risks to general attendees.

== See also ==
- List of sports venues in Portland, Oregon
- Winter Wonderland (Portland, Oregon)
