= Oliver Turvey =

British race driver

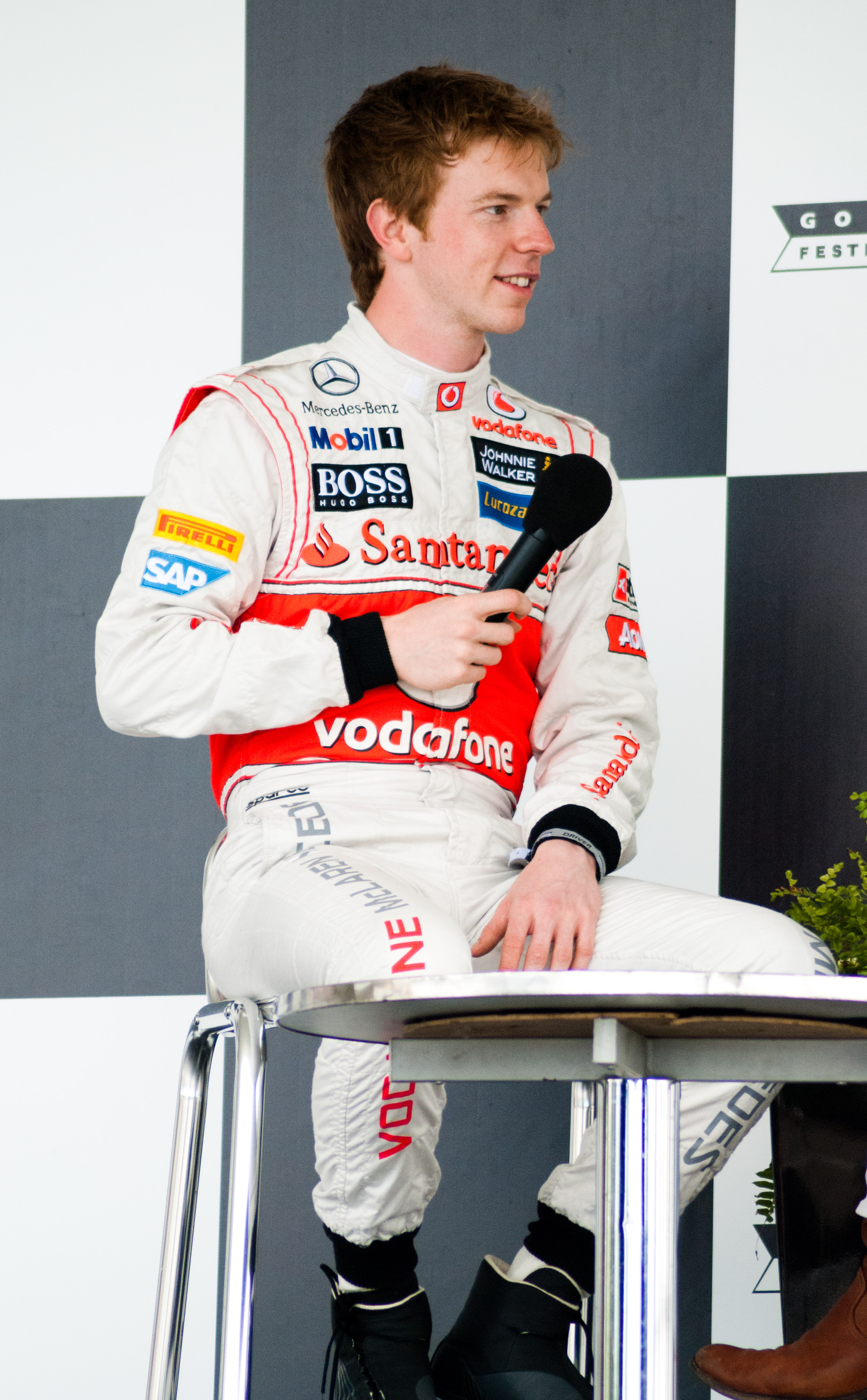
- Turvey in 2012
- Nationality: (United Kingdom) British
- Born: Oliver Jonathan Turvey; 1 April 1987 (age 39) Penrith, Cumbria, England

Formula E career
- Debut season: 2014–15
- Categorisation: FIA Platinum
- Former teams: NIO Formula E Team
- Starts: 86
- Championships: 0
- Wins: 0
- Podiums: 1
- Poles: 1
- Fastest laps: 0
- Best finish: 10th in 2017–18
- Finished last season: 18th (6 pts)

Previous series
- 2004–06 2007 2007 2008 2009 2009–10–2011 2011 2013: Formula BMW UK; Italian FRenault; Eurocup Formula Renault 2.0; British Formula 3 Formula Renault 3.5 Series; GP2 Asia Series; Blancpain Endurance Series; European Le Mans Series

Awards
- 2006 2008: McLaren Autosport Award; Cambridge Full Blue

Oliver Jonathan Turvey (born 1 April 1987) is a British professional racing driver who serves as a test and development driver for Williams in Formula One, and a reserve and development driver for Envision in Formula E. He is best known for his Formula E career with NIO between 2015 and 2022. Turvey was previously a long-term test driver for McLaren in Formula One, having won the 2006 McLaren Autosport BRDC Award. His career was supported by the Racing Steps Foundation.

== Career history ==
=== Karting ===
Like many aspiring junior racing drivers, Penrith-born Turvey began his karting career at eight years old. After three seasons, he progressed to the British Cadet Championship in 1999, in which he was placed fifth overall, and was selected as a member of the English National team, which won that year's Inter-nation Championship. In 2000, Turvey graduated to the Junior Yamaha National Championship and won the title. After a season in Junior TKM, he moved on to the Junior Rotax class in 2002 and added that title to his collection.

=== Car racing ===
Turvey made his formula single seater debut in the 2003 British Formula Renault Winter Series and spent the remainder of the season competing in Zip Formula, in which he was the highest-placed rookie. In 2004, he sidestepped into Formula BMW UK with Team SWR and achieved one race win. At the end of the season, he made a one-off Formula Three debut in the Promotion class of the Asian F3 Championship.

In the following season, Turvey stayed with Team SWR in Formula BMW, making eight appearances (each with two race starts) in the ten-round championship. Budgetary restrictions prevented him from entering more than seven rounds in 2006, but points scores in every race (including five wins) secured second place overall. At the Formula BMW World Final in Valencia, he was the highest-placed British finisher in sixth position. Turvey ended the year by beating five other finalists to win the McLaren Autosport BRDC Young Driver of the Year Award.

Although Turvey was expected to graduate to the British F3 Championship in 2007, he has instead opted for the opportunity of competing in continental Europe. He spent the season dovetailing a dual program in Italian Formula Renault and the Formula Renault Eurocup with the experienced Jenzer Motorsport organisation. In 2008, he was runner-up in the British Formula 3 Championship, behind teammate Jaime Alguersuari.

Turvey competed in the World Series by Renault for 2009, where he was once again paired with Alguersuari at Carlin. He won a single race and finished the championship as top rookie, in fourth position. He competed in the 2009–10 GP2 Asia Series season and took part in the 2010 GP2 Series season for the iSport International team.

On 16 November 2010, Turvey took part in the Formula One young drivers test in Abu Dhabi driving for McLaren. Turvey set the second fastest time, 1.1 seconds slower than the quickest time set by Red Bull's Daniel Ricciardo.

With his Racing Steps Foundation backing having expired at the end of 2010, Turvey was unable to raise a budget for another GP2 season in 2011. However, he was drafted by Carlin—the team now competing in its first year of GP2—to replace Mikhail Aleshin for the third round of the championship in Monaco; Aleshin also struggling to find enough money for a full season. He finished in the points in his comeback race, but was subsequently penalised due to jumping the start. He was replaced for the following round by Álvaro Parente, and finished 25th in the championship. Prior to the start of the 2011 GP2 Series, Turvey drove in the 2011 GP2 Asia Series season for Ocean Racing Technology.

Aside from his GP2 drives, Turvey also competed in selected rounds of the 2011 Blancpain Endurance Series season for CRS Racing, competing alongside Andrew Kirkaldy and Alvaro Parente in a McLaren MP4-12C GT3.

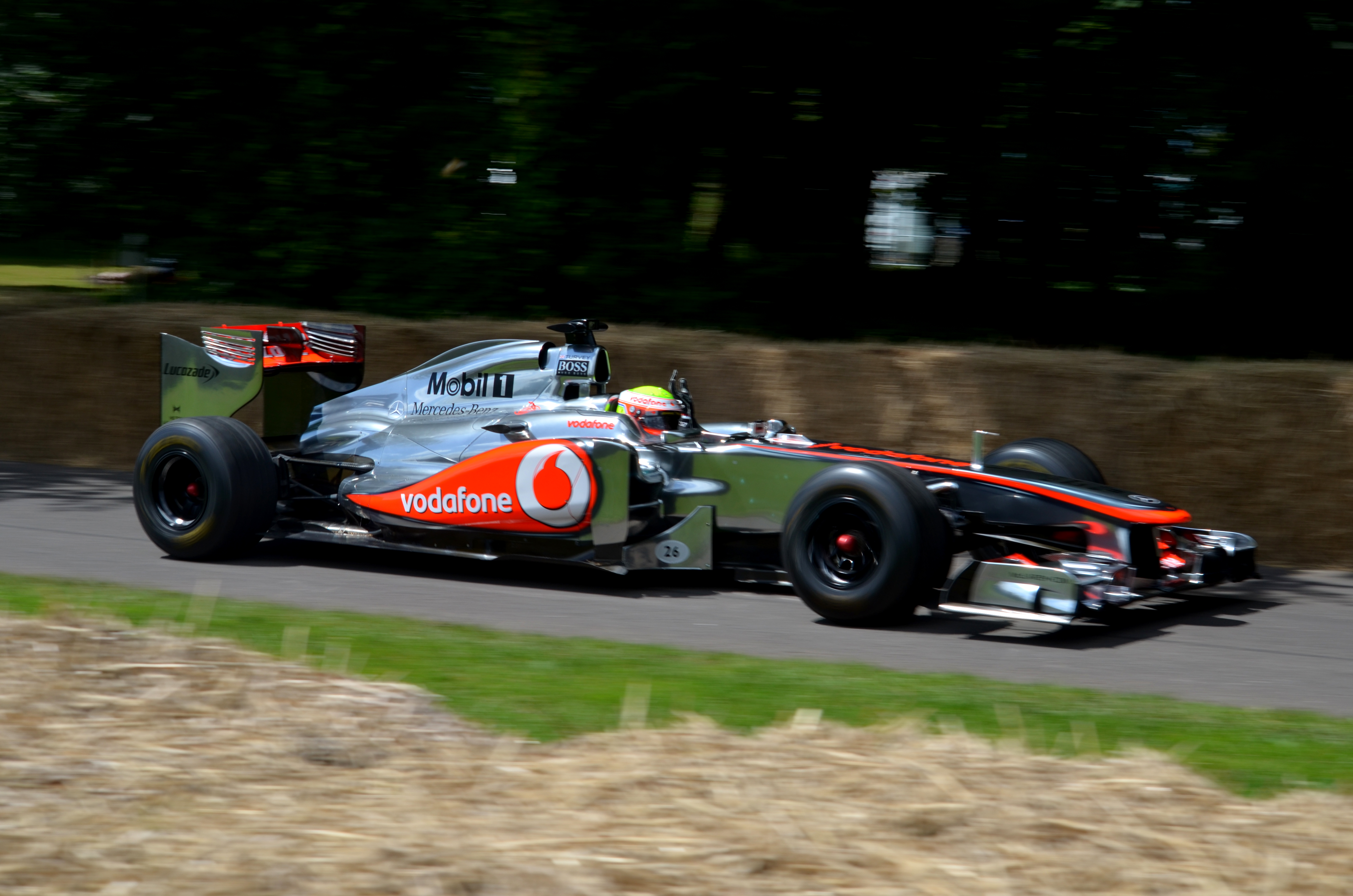
Turvey driving a McLaren MP4-26 at the 2012 Goodwood Festival of Speed

Turvey joined Gary Paffett as a test driver for McLaren for the 2012 Formula One season.

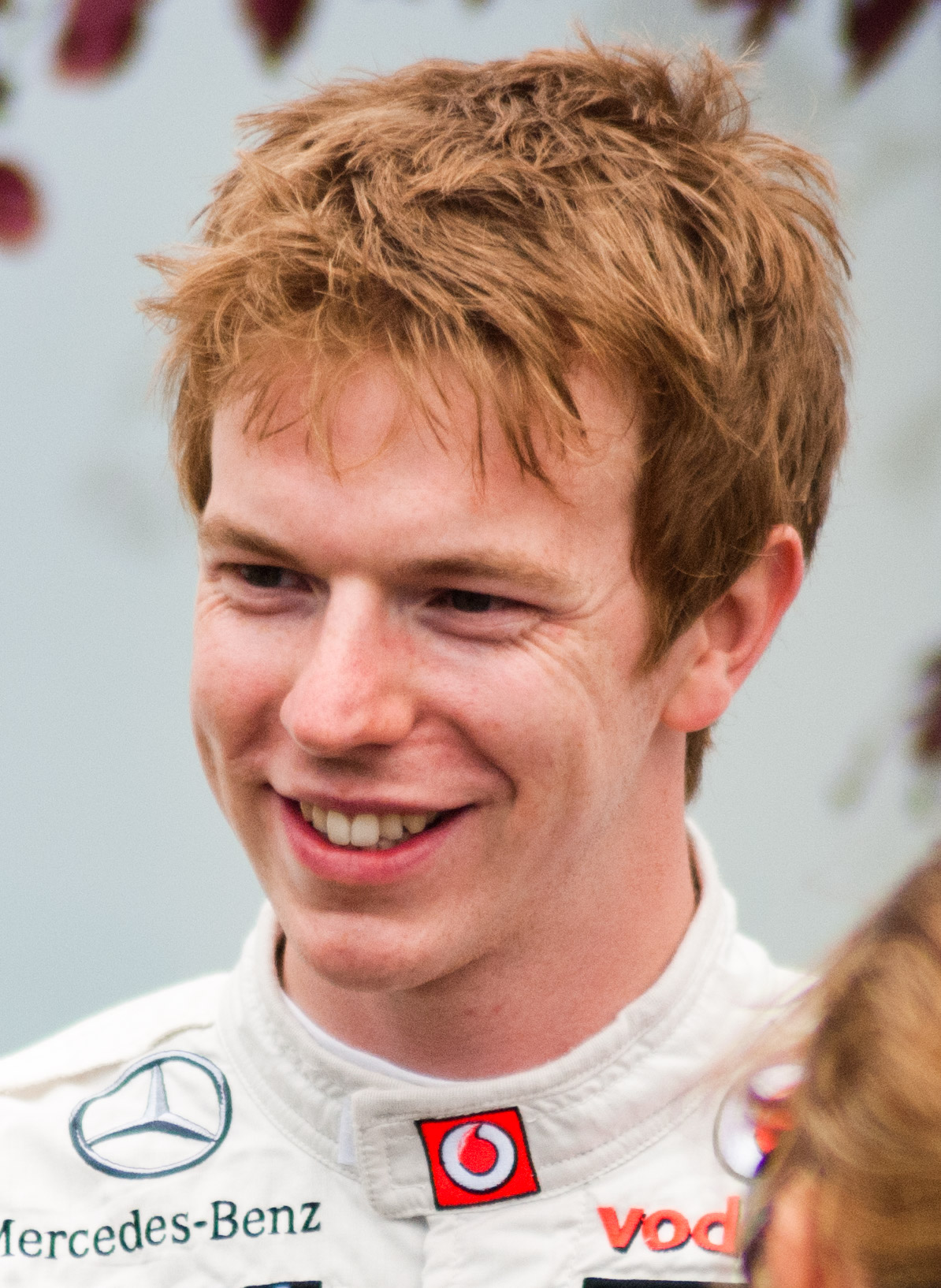
Turvey in 2012

In 2013, Turvey stepped up from GTs to Sports Prototypes by signing a deal with Jota Sport to race their LMP2 Zytek Z11SN-Nissan in the 2013 European Le Mans Series season and selected rounds of the FIA World Endurance Championship, including the 2013 24 Hours of Le Mans. Turvey qualified on pole position and won his first start in the car, at the opening rain-shortened ELMS round at Silverstone.

In February 2014, it was announced that Turvey would partner Fabien Giroix and John Martin in an LMP2 Oreca 03-Nissan run by Delta Motorsport and Millennium Racing for an assault on the 2014 FIA World Endurance Championship season. However the team's plans received a setback when they withdrew from the season-opening 6 Hours of Silverstone due to delays in receiving funding. They subsequently missed the second round of the WEC and the 2014 24 Hours of Le Mans due to their financial problems. However, Turvey received a call up from the Jota squad to race at Le Mans when Jota and Audi reserve driver Marc Gené replaced Audi driver Loïc Duval when the latter was injured in a practice crash. Turvey subsequently shared the LMP2 class win alongside his teammates.

In January 2025, Turvey departed McLaren to join Williams as test and development driver.

=== Formula E ===
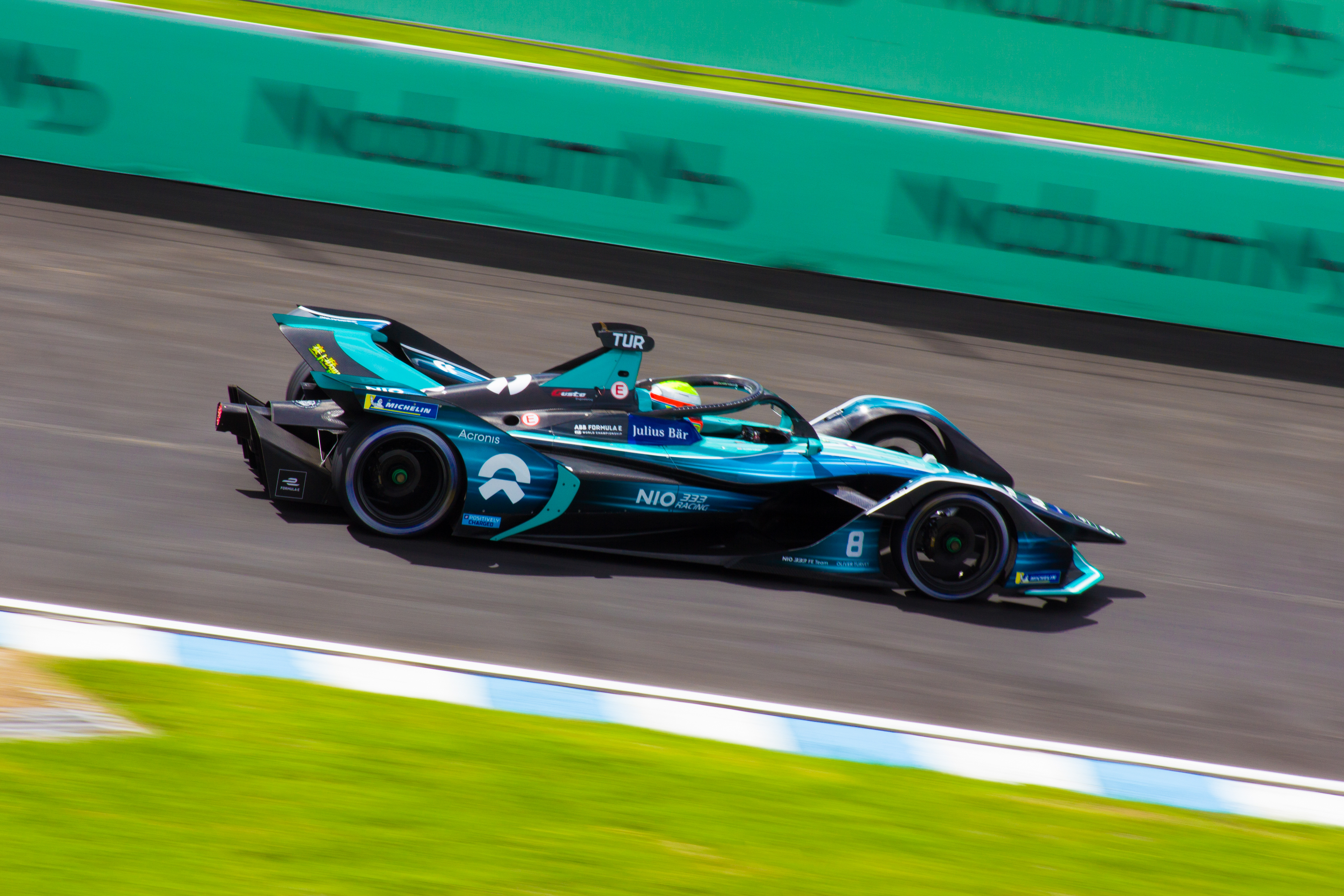
Turvey driving at the 2021 Puebla ePrix.

Turvey would make his Formula E debut for NEXTEV TCR at the 2015 London ePrix, partnering with Nelson Piquet Jr. He would finish ninth in both events. He and Piquet Jr. would be retained for the 2015–16 season, where he would place 14th in the final standings with 11 points alongside a best finish of sixth at Beijing. Turvey, now with a rebranded NEXTEV NIO for the 2016–17 season, would earn his first pole position in Formula E at Mexico City after Daniel Abt was penalised due to a tyre pressure infringement, but would ultimately retire from the race due to battery issues. He would finish 12th in the final points standings with 26 points. For the 2017–18 season, Turvey would partner with Luca Filippi in the once again rebranded NIO Formula E Team, where would earn his first podium in Mexico City with a second place finish. He would finish tenth in the standings with 46 points despite withdrawing from the New York ePrix due to suffering a hand injury during second practice. Turvey would then partner with Tom Dillmann for the 2018–19 season, where he would only score seven points throughout the course of the season with a best result of eighth at Santiago. In the following season, he would partner with Ma Qinghua at the beginning of the year and then with Daniel Abt for the final rounds at Berlin for NIO 333 FE Team, where he would 24th in the standings with no points. He would then partner with Tom Blomqvist for the 2020–21 season, finishing 23rd in the standings with thirteen points and a best result of sixth at Diriyah. Turvey would partner with former Formula 2 driver Dan Ticktum for the 2021–22 season, where he would only finish in the points once at Rome with a seventh place finish. He would finish 18th in the standings. Turvey would not be retained for the following season, and would join DS Penske as the team's reserve driver as well as sporting advisor. After the team departed the series following the conclusion of the 2025–26 season, he moved to a reserve and development role at Envision Racing for the 2026–27 season.

=== Awards ===
Dec. 2006 – McLaren Autosport BRDC Award
2008 – Sports Personality of the Year award at the 2008 Cumbria Sports Awards
2008 – Daily Mirror Best British Driver in F3 Award
2008 – Awarded the Dunhill Future Champion Award at Goodwood Festival of Speed
2008 – University of Cambridge Extraordinary Full Blue for Motorsport (the first ever for the sport).
2008 – British Racing Drivers' Club National Racing Driver of the Year

=== Education ===
Turvey attended Queen Elizabeth Grammar School in Penrith, Cumbria in England and Fitzwilliam College, Cambridge as an undergraduate, where he studied engineering. In late 2007, he applied to become a Cambridge Full Blue, the highest honour that can be awarded to a sportsman at the university. He completed his bachelor's degree in 2008 and was awarded the Full Blue by the university; the first ever racing driver to be awarded the accolade. His Master's will include a dissertation on F1 aerodynamics. He has a sister, called Lucie, who also attended Queen Elizabeth Grammar School. Turvey currently lives in London.

== Racing career ==
=== Career summary ===
Season	Series	Team	Races	Wins	Poles	F/Laps	Podiums	Points	Position
2003	Zip Formula Great Britain	Unknown	4	0	-	-	-	118	4th
2003	Formula Renault UK Winter Series	Mark Burdett Motorsport	4	0	0	0	0	6	18th
2004	Formula BMW UK	SWR Omegaland	18	1	0	0	1	83	7th
2004	Formula BMW UK	Team SWR Pioneer	18	1	0	0	1	83	7th
2005	Formula BMW UK	Team SWR Pioneer	16	0	1	2	6	103	8th
2006	Formula BMW UK	Team Loctite	14	5	7	2	10	209	**2nd**
2007	Eurocup Formula Renault 2.0	Jenzer Motorsport	13	0	0	0	1	51	8th
2007	Formula Renault 2.0 Italy	Jenzer Motorsport	14	0	1	0	2	176	9th
2007	Porsche Carrera Cup GB	Porsche Motorsport	2	0	0	0	0	0	NC†
2008	British Formula 3 International Series	Carlin Motorsport	22	4	4	4	13	234	**2nd**
2009	Formula Renault 3.5 Series	Carlin Motorsport	17	1	1	0	5	93	4th
2009	Formula One	Vodafone McLaren Mercedes	Test driver						
2010	GP2 Series	iSport International	20	0	1	1	4	48	6th
2010	Formula One	Vodafone McLaren Mercedes	Test driver						
2011	GP2 Series	Carlin Motorsport	2	0	0	0	0	0	25th
2011	Formula One	Vodafone McLaren Mercedes	Test driver						
2012	Formula One	Vodafone McLaren Mercedes	Test driver						
2013	European Le Mans Series	Jota Sport	5	1	4	1	3	71	**3rd**
2013	24 Hours of Le Mans - LMP2	Jota Sport	1	0	0	0	0	N/A	7th
2013	FIA GT Series	MRS GT Racing	2	0	0	0	0	0	NC†
2013	Formula One	Vodafone McLaren Mercedes	Test driver						
2014	24 Hours of Le Mans - LMP2	Jota Sport	1	1	0	0	1	N/A	**1st**
2014	Formula One	McLaren Mercedes	Test driver						
2014–15	Formula E	NEXTEV TCR	2	0	0	0	0	2	22nd
2015	Super GT	Drago Modulo Honda Racing	8	0	0	0	0	26	12th
2015	24 Hours of Le Mans - LMP2	Jota Sport	1	0	0	1	1	N/A	**2nd**
2015	Formula One	McLaren Honda	Test driver						
2015–16	Formula E	NEXTEV TCR	10	0	0	0	0	11	14th
2016	Super GT	Drago Modulo Honda Racing	5	0	1	0	0	5	19th
2016	Formula One	McLaren Honda	Test driver						
2016–17	Formula E	NextEV	12	0	1	0	0	26	12th
2017	Formula One	McLaren Honda	Test driver						
2017–18	Formula E	Nio Formula E Team	10	0	0	0	1	46	10th
2018	24 Hours of Le Mans	CEFC TRSM Racing	1	0	0	0	0	N/A	DNF
2018	Formula One	McLaren F1 Team	Test driver						
2018–19	Formula E	Nio Formula E Team	13	0	0	0	0	7	20th
2018–19	FIA World Endurance Championship	CEFC TRSM Racing	1	0	0	0	0	0	NC
2019	Formula One	McLaren F1 Team	Test driver						
2019–20	Formula E	Nio 333 FE Team	11	0	0	0	0	0	24th
2020	Formula One	McLaren F1 Team	Test driver						
2020–21	Formula E	Nio 333 FE Team	15	0	0	0	0	13	23rd
2021	Formula One	McLaren F1 Team	Test driver						
2021–22	Formula E	Nio 333 FE Team	16	0	0	0	0	6	18th
2022	Formula One	McLaren F1 Team	Test driver						
2022–23	Formula E	DS Penske	Reserve driver						
2023	Formula One	McLaren F1 Team	Test driver						
2023–24	Formula E	DS Penske	Reserve driver						
2024	Formula One	McLaren F1 Team	Test driver						
2024–25	Formula E	DS Penske	Reserve driver						
2025	Formula One	Atlassian Williams Racing	Test and development driver						
2025–26	Formula E	DS Penske	Reserve driver						
2026	Formula One	Atlassian Williams F1 Team	Test and development driver						
2026–27	Formula E	Paysafe Envision Formula E Team	Reserve and development driver						

^{†} As Turvey was a guest driver, he was ineligible for points.
^{*} Season still in progress.

=== Complete Eurocup Formula Renault 2.0 results ===
(key) (Races in bold indicate pole position; races in italics indicate fastest lap)

Year	Entrant	1	2	3	4	5	6	7	8	9	10	11	12	13	14	DC	Points
2007	Jenzer Motorsport	ZOL; 1; 6	ZOL; 2; 4	NÜR; 1; 7	NÜR; 2; 3	HUN; 1; 5	HUN; 2; 9	DON; 1; 18	DON; 2; 12	MAG; 1; 7	MAG; 2; 4	EST; 1; 11	EST; 2; 13	CAT; 1; 10	CAT; 2 DNS	8th	51

=== Complete Formula Renault 3.5 Series results ===
(key) (Races in bold indicate pole position) (Races in italics indicate fastest lap)

Year	Team	1	2	3	4	5	6	7	8	9	10	11	12	13	14	15	16	17	Pos	Pts
2009	Carlin Motorsport	CAT; SPR; 4	CAT; FEA; 11	SPA; SPR; 6	SPA; FEA; 14	**MON**; **FEA**; 1	HUN; SPR; 8	HUN; FEA; Ret	SIL; SPR; 3	SIL; FEA; 3	BUG; SPR; 3	BUG; FEA; 10	ALG; SPR; Ret	ALG; FEA; 6	NÜR; SPR; 4	NÜR; FEA; Ret	**ALC**; **SPR**; 2	ALC; FEA; 5	4th	93

=== Complete GP2 Series results ===
(key) (Races in bold indicate pole position) (Races in italics indicate fastest lap)

Year	Entrant	1	2	3	4	5	6	7	8	9	10	11	12	13	14	15	16	17	18	19	20	DC	Points
2010	iSport International	CAT; FEA; 5	CAT; SPR; 5	MON; FEA; 15	MON; SPR; 15	IST; FEA; 14	IST; SPR; 18	VAL; FEA; Ret	VAL; SPR; 12	SIL; FEA; 8	SIL; SPR; 2	HOC; FEA; 8	HOC; SPR; 2	HUN; FEA; 4	HUN; SPR; 5	SPA; FEA; 6	SPA; SPR; 5	MNZ; FEA; 3	MNZ; SPR; 6	**YMC**; **FEA**; 2	YMC; SPR; 17	6th	47
2011	Carlin	IST; FEA	IST; SPR	CAT; FEA	CAT; SPR	MON; FEA; 14	MON; SPR; 8	VAL; FEA	VAL; SPR	SIL; FEA	SIL; SPR	NÜR; FEA	NÜR; SPR	HUN; FEA	HUN; SPR	SPA; FEA	SPA; SPR	MNZ; FEA	MNZ; SPR			25th	0

==== Complete GP2 Asia Series results ====
(key) (Races in bold indicate pole position) (Races in italics indicate fastest lap)

Year	Entrant	1	2	3	4	5	6	7	8	DC	Points
2009–10	iSport International	YMC1; FEA; 8	YMC1; SPR; 4	YMC2; FEA; 1	YMC2; SPR; 5	BHR1; FEA; 9	BHR1; SPR; 6	BHR2; FEA; 9	BHR2; SPR; 11	6th	17
2011	Ocean Racing Technology	YMC; FEA; 18	YMC; SPR; 19	IMO; FEA; 14	IMO; SPR; 8					16th	0

=== 24 Hours of Le Mans results ===
Year	Team	Co-Drivers	Car	Class	Laps	Pos.	Class Pos.
2013	(United Kingdom) Jota Sport	(United Kingdom) Simon Dolan (Germany) Lucas Luhr	Zytek Z11SN-Nissan	LMP2	319	13th	7th
2014	(United Kingdom) Jota Sport	(United Kingdom) Simon Dolan (United Kingdom) Harry Tincknell	Zytek Z11SN-Nissan	LMP2	356	5th	**1st**
2015	(United Kingdom) Jota Sport	(United Kingdom) Simon Dolan (New Zealand) Mitch Evans	Gibson 015S-Nissan	LMP2	358	10th	**2nd**
2018	(China) CEFC TRSM Racing	(United Kingdom) Alex Brundle (United Kingdom) Oliver Rowland	Ginetta G60-LT-P1-Mecachrome	LMP1	137	DNF	DNF

=== Complete European Le Mans Series results ===
(key) (Races in bold indicate pole position) (Races in italics indicate fastest lap)

Year	Team	Class	Car	Engine	1	2	3	4	5	Rank	Points
2013	Jota Sport	LMP2	Zytek Z11SN	Nissan VK45DE 4.5 L V8	**SIL**; 1	**IMO**; Ret	**RBR**; 4	HUN; 3	**LEC**; 3	3rd	71

=== Complete Super GT results ===
(key) (Races in bold indicate pole position) (Races in italics indicate fastest lap)

Year	Team	Car	Class	1	2	3	4	5	6	7	8	DC	Points
2015	Drago Modulo Honda Racing	Honda NSX-GT	GT500	OKA; 6	FUJ; 8	CHA; 10	FUJ; 6	SUZ; 12	SUG; 7	AUT; 7	MOT; 7	12th	26
2016	Drago Modulo Honda Racing	Honda NSX-GT	GT500	OKA; 12	FUJ; 13	SUG; 7	FUJ; Ret	**SUZ**; Ret	CHA	MOT	MOT	19th	5

=== Complete Formula E results ===
(key) (Races in bold indicate pole position; races in italics indicate fastest lap)

Year	Team	Chassis	Powertrain	1	2	3	4	5	6	7	8	9	10	11	12	13	14	15	16	Pos	Points
2014–15	NEXTEV TCR	Spark SRT01-e	SRT01-e	BEI	PUT	PDE	BUE	MIA	LBH	MCO	BER	MSC	LDN; 9	LDN; 9						22nd	4
2015–16	NEXTEV TCR	Spark SRT01-e	NEXTEV TCR FormulaE 001	BEI; 6	PUT; Ret	PDE; 12	BUE; 9	MEX; 11	LBH; 12	PAR; 13	BER; 12	LDN; 15†	LDN; 10							14th	11
2016–17	NEXTEV NIO	Spark SRT01-e	NEXTEV FormulaE 002	HKG; 8	MRK; 7	BUE; 9	**MEX**; Ret	MCO; 13†	PAR; 11	BER; 10	BER; 9	NYC; 6	NYC; 14	MTL; 15	MTL; 17					12th	26
2017–18	NIO Formula E Team	Spark SRT01-e	NextEV Nio Sport 003	HKG; 16	HKG; 6	MRK; Ret	SCL; 14	MEX; 2	PDE; 7	RME; 12	PAR; 9	BER; 5	ZUR; 9	NYC; WD	NYC					10th	46
2018–19	NIO Formula E Team	Spark SRT05e	Nio Sport 004	ADR; 13	MRK; 16	SCL; 8	MEX; 12	HKG; 9	SYX; 12	RME; 13	PAR; 14	MCO; Ret	BER; 18	BRN; 16	NYC; 10	NYC; 13				20th	7
2019–20	Nio 333 FE Team	Spark SRT05e	Nio FE-005	DIR; 15	DIR; DSQ	SCL; 11	MEX; 13	MRK; 21	BER; 16	BER; 18	BER; 16	BER; 22	BER; 19	BER; 21						24th	0
2020–21	Nio 333 FE Team	Spark SRT05e	NIO 333 001	DIR; 10	DIR; 6	RME; DNS	RME; 14	VLC; NC	VLC; 8	MCO; 19	PUE; 11	PUE; Ret	NYC; Ret	NYC; Ret	LDN; 15	LDN; 14	BER; 19	BER; 19		23rd	13
2021–22	Nio 333 FE Team	Spark SRT05e	NIO 333 001	DRH; 19	DRH; 18	MEX; 14	RME; 17	RME; 7	MCO; 14	BER; 16	BER; 17	JAK; 12	MRK; 17	NYC; 15	NYC; 16	LDN; 15	LDN; 14	SEO; Ret	SEO; 15	18th	6

^{†} Driver did not finish the race, but was classified as he completed more than 90% of the race distance.
^{*} Season still in progress.

=== Complete FIA World Endurance Championship results ===
(key) (Races in bold indicate pole position; races in italics indicate fastest lap)

Year	Entrant	Class	Chassis	Engine	1	2	3	4	5	6	7	8	Rank	Points
2018–19	CEFC TRSM Racing	LMP1	Ginetta G60-LT-P1	Mecachrome V634P1 3.4 L Turbo V6	SPA; WD	LMS; Ret	SIL	FUJ	SHA	SEB	SPA	LMS	NC	0

Awards
Preceded by Oliver Jarvis	McLaren Autosport BRDC Award; 2006	Succeeded by Stefan Wilson
Preceded by Jason Plato (Racing Driver); Mark Higgins (Rally Driver)	Autosport; National Driver of the Year; 2008	Succeeded by Colin Turkington
