= 2011 GP2 Series =

Season of Formula One feeder championship

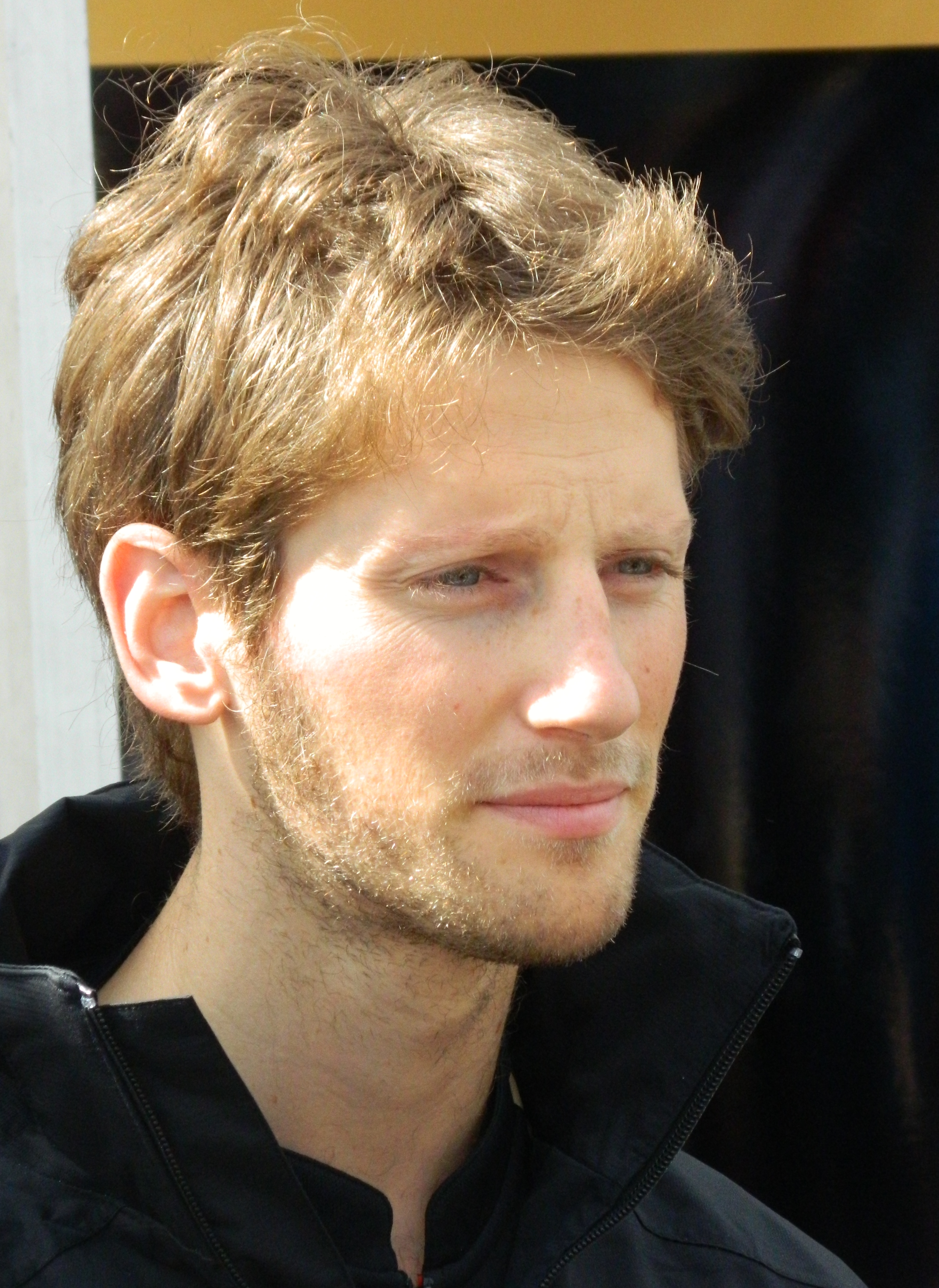
Romain Grosjean (DAMS) won the drivers' championship.

The 2011 GP2 Series season was the forty-fifth season of the second-tier of Formula One feeder championship and also seventh season under the GP2 Series moniker, the pan-European motor racing series for single specification open wheel GP2 cars. Thirteen teams competed over a nine event series that run from 7 May at Istanbul Park in Turkey to 11 September at Monza in Italy. The series again performed the role of a series for developing emerging young drivers, acting as the principal supporting motor racing series that fills in time between sessions of the nine World Championship Formula One Grands Prix that are held in Europe. The championship was won by reigning GP2 Asia champion Romain Grosjean at the penultimate round of the series. Luca Filippi, Jules Bianchi and Charles Pic were all divided just by two points in their battle for the second, third and fourth places respectively. Christian Vietoris, Davide Valsecchi, Stefano Coletti, Esteban Gutiérrez and Fabio Leimer was the other race winners.

Following a three-year cycle, the previous GP2 chassis was replaced by a brand new car, the GP2/11, built by Italian racing car manufacturer Dallara. The engine configuration remained the same until the end of the 2017 season, with the only modifications being to the exhaust systems. The series changed tyre supplier from Bridgestone to Pirelli for 2011–13. The 2011 season saw the addition of two new teams to the grid, Carlin and Team AirAsia. Meanwhile, DPR was not selected to continue in the series.

On 22 November 2010 it was announced that Renault would no longer badge their Mecachrome GP2 Series engines, instead Mecachrome would run its own engine program from 2011 onwards. All GP2 Series cars had a reverse gear for the first time in the series.

== Teams and drivers ==
This section lists drivers who competed in the regular season. For the drivers who competed in the non-championship race in Abu Dhabi, see 2011 GP2 Final.

Team	No.	Driver name	Rounds
(Italy) Rapax	1	(Switzerland) Fabio Leimer	All
(Italy) Rapax	2	(Colombia) Julián Leal (Note: Leal is a Colombian driver who competed under an Italian racing licence in rounds 1–4.)	All
(Spain) Barwa Addax Team	3	(France) Charles Pic	All
(Spain) Barwa Addax Team	4	(Netherlands) Giedo van der Garde	All
(France) Lotus ART	5	(France) Jules Bianchi	All
(France) Lotus ART	6	(Mexico) Esteban Gutiérrez	All
(Spain) Racing Engineering	7	(Spain) Dani Clos	All
(Spain) Racing Engineering	8	(Germany) Christian Vietoris	1, 4–9
(Spain) Racing Engineering	8	(Portugal) Álvaro Parente	2–3
(United Kingdom) iSport International	9	(United Kingdom) Sam Bird	All
(United Kingdom) iSport International	10	(Sweden) Marcus Ericsson	All
(France) DAMS	11	(France) Romain Grosjean	All
(France) DAMS	12	(Norway) Pål Varhaug	All
(United Kingdom) Arden International	14	(Czech Republic) Josef Král	All
(United Kingdom) Arden International	15	(United Kingdom) Jolyon Palmer	All
(United Kingdom) Super Nova Racing	16	(Malaysia) Fairuz Fauzy	All
(United Kingdom) Super Nova Racing	17	(Italy) Luca Filippi	1–5
(United Kingdom) Super Nova Racing	17	(United Kingdom) Adam Carroll	6–9
(Italy) Scuderia Coloni	18	(Romania) Michael Herck	All
(Italy) Scuderia Coloni	19	(Italy) Davide Rigon	1
(Italy) Scuderia Coloni	19	(Italy) Kevin Ceccon	2–5
(Italy) Scuderia Coloni	19	(Italy) Luca Filippi	6–9
(Italy) Trident Racing	20	(Venezuela) Rodolfo González	All
(Italy) Trident Racing	21	(Monaco) Stefano Coletti	1–8
(Italy) Trident Racing	21	(Monaco) Stéphane Richelmi	9
(Portugal) Ocean Racing Technology	22	(Germany) Kevin Mirocha	1–7
(Portugal) Ocean Racing Technology	22	(New Zealand) Brendon Hartley	8–9
(Portugal) Ocean Racing Technology	23	(Venezuela) Johnny Cecotto Jr.	All
(United Kingdom) Carlin	24	(United Kingdom) Max Chilton	All
(United Kingdom) Carlin	25	(Russia) Mikhail Aleshin	1–2, 7–8
(United Kingdom) Carlin	25	(United Kingdom) Oliver Turvey	3
(United Kingdom) Carlin	25	(Portugal) Álvaro Parente	4–6, 9
(Malaysia) Team AirAsia (1–3) (Malaysia) Caterham Team AirAsia (4–9)	26	(Brazil) Luiz Razia	All
(Malaysia) Team AirAsia (1–3) (Malaysia) Caterham Team AirAsia (4–9)	27	(Italy) Davide Valsecchi	All

=== Team changes ===
- David Price Racing left GP2, while Carlin and Team AirAsia joined the series, filling the vacancies left by DPR and Durango (who left ahead of the 2010 season).
- Lotus Cars lent its name to ART Grand Prix in a similar arrangement to their sponsorship of Takuma Sato and KV Racing Technology in the IndyCar Series, while Team Lotus is behind the new Team AirAsia outfit. Aside from the name, there is no crossover between Lotus ART and Team Air Asia.

=== Driver changes ===
Changed teams

- Sam Bird moved to iSport International after competing in his rookie season for ART Grand Prix. He partnered Marcus Ericsson, who moves over from Super Nova Racing.
- Johnny Cecotto Jr. switched from Trident Racing to Ocean Racing Technology, having competed for Trident in the first eight meetings of the 2010 season.
- Max Chilton moved from Ocean Racing Technology to be part of Carlin's inaugural GP2 pairing.
- Rodolfo González returned to Trident Racing after a season with Arden International. González drove for Trident at the German round in 2009.
- After driving for DPR for most of his GP2 career to date, Michael Herck moved to Scuderia Coloni.
- After driving for Super Nova Racing in his rookie season, Josef Král switched to Arden International.
- Fabio Leimer moved from Ocean Racing Technology to Rapax.
- Charles Pic switched from Arden International to partner Giedo van der Garde at Barwa Addax.
- Luiz Razia moved from team's champions Rapax to debutants Team Air Asia. Davide Valsecchi joined him after a season with iSport International.

Entering/Re-Entering GP2 Series

- Formula Renault 3.5 Series champion Mikhail Aleshin has extended his collaboration with Carlin for GP2, making a return to GP2 after contesting two meetings in 2007 with ART Grand Prix.
- Stefano Coletti returned to the series with Trident Racing, having competed in two rounds in 2009 for Durango.
- Fairuz Fauzy made his comeback to the series with Super Nova Racing, the team that Fauzy competed with in 2006 and also in the 2008 Asia Series.
- GP3 Series champion Esteban Gutiérrez moved up to GP2 with Lotus ART, having raced for the team in GP3.
- Julián Leal made his debut in the series with Rapax, having finished 20th in the Formula Renault 3.5 Series for International DracoRacing.
- After a part season in the Formula Renault 2.0 Northern European Cup, Kevin Mirocha graduated into GP2 with Ocean Racing Technology.
- FIA Formula Two Championship runner-up Jolyon Palmer joined Arden International.
- Davide Rigon returned to the series with Scuderia Coloni, having driven for Trident Racing in 2009.
- Pål Varhaug moved up from the GP3 Series to drive for DAMS.

Leaving GP2

- 2010 champion Pastor Maldonado will from Rapax to compete in Formula One with Williams alongside Rubens Barrichello.
- Jérôme d'Ambrosio left DAMS to compete in Formula One for Virgin Racing alongside former GP2 Champion Timo Glock, having previously driven for the team during Friday practice sessions at selected events in 2010.
- Sergio Pérez moved from Barwa Addax to compete in Formula One with Sauber alongside former Asia Series champion Kamui Kobayashi.
- Ho-Pin Tung moved to the IndyCar Series as a part-time entry with Dragon Racing, and failed to qualify for the 2011 Indianapolis 500.
- Alberto Valerio returned to his native Brazil to compete in the Copa Caixa Stock Car series.
- Adrian Zaugg moved to Auto GP, but completed only one event in 2011.

Midseason Changes

- A number of midseason changes were also made during the season, to replace other drivers. Scuderia Coloni's Davide Rigon suffered stable fractures of the tibia and fibula in an accident with Julián Leal in Istanbul. He was replaced by Kevin Ceccon in Montmeló and Monaco after Vietoris' accident in Istanbul left him suffering from severe headaches. He continued with his campaign in DTM despite this, and returned to GP2 in time for the Valencia round.
- For Monaco, Oliver Turvey made his return to the category, replacing Mikhail Aleshin at Carlin. Turvey was later replaced by Álvaro Parente in Valencia. Aleshin returned at the Hungaroring, as Parente had a prior commitment to compete for McLaren at the Spa 24 Hours.
- Prior to the round at the Nürburgring, Kevin Ceccon left Scuderia Coloni to concentrate on Auto GP. He was replaced by fellow Auto GP racer Luca Filippi from Super Nova Racing. Filippi's vacated seat was taken by Adam Carroll, who returned to the series after participating between 2005 and 2008. Ceccon later returned to the team for the non-championship round in Abu Dhabi.
- For the round held at Spa-Francorchamps, Brendon Hartley replaced Kevin Mirocha in the Ocean Racing Technology team.
- For the round held at Monza, the injured Stefano Coletti was replaced by Stéphane Richelmi.

== 2011 Schedule ==
The 2011 calendar was announced on 21 December 2010. The series will consist of nine rounds, one less than in 2010, as the Abu Dhabi round will return to the GP2 Asia Series and will not be replaced. It will support all the European Formula One events.

On 12 July 2011, it was announced that a non-championship round will take place in Abu Dhabi under the name 2011 GP2 Final.

Round		Location	Circuit	Date	Time		Tyres (Note: Pirelli supplied only one dry compound to the teams to be used throughout the race weekend.)	Supporting
Round		Location	Circuit	Date	Local	UTC	Tyres	Supporting
1	F	Istanbul, Turkey	Istanbul Park	7 May	15:40	12:40	Medium	Turkish Grand Prix
1	S	Istanbul, Turkey	Istanbul Park	8 May	11:35	08:35	Medium	Turkish Grand Prix
2	F	Montmeló, Spain	Circuit de Catalunya	21 May	15:40	13:40	Hard	Spanish Grand Prix
2	S	Montmeló, Spain	Circuit de Catalunya	22 May	10:35	08:35	Hard	Spanish Grand Prix
3	F	Monte Carlo, Monaco	Circuit de Monaco	27 May	11:15	09:15	Super Soft	Monaco Grand Prix
3	S	Monte Carlo, Monaco	Circuit de Monaco	28 May	16:30	14:30	Super Soft	Monaco Grand Prix
4	F	Valencia, Spain	Valencia Street Circuit	25 June	15:40	13:40	Soft	European Grand Prix
4	S	Valencia, Spain	Valencia Street Circuit	26 June	10:35	08:35	Soft	European Grand Prix
5	F	(United Kingdom) Silverstone, Great Britain	Silverstone Circuit	9 July	14:40	13:40	Medium	British Grand Prix
5	S	(United Kingdom) Silverstone, Great Britain	Silverstone Circuit	10 July	09:30	08:30	Medium	British Grand Prix
6	F	Nürburg, Germany	Nürburgring	23 July	15:40	13:40	Soft	German Grand Prix
6	S	Nürburg, Germany	Nürburgring	24 July	10:30	08:30	Soft	German Grand Prix
7	F	Mogyoród, Hungary	Hungaroring	30 July	15:40	13:40	Soft	Hungarian Grand Prix
7	S	Mogyoród, Hungary	Hungaroring	31 July	10:30	08:30	Soft	Hungarian Grand Prix
8	F	Stavelot, Belgium	Circuit de Spa-Francorchamps	27 August	15:40	13:40	Medium	Belgian Grand Prix
8	S	Stavelot, Belgium	Circuit de Spa-Francorchamps	28 August	10:30	08:30	Medium	Belgian Grand Prix
9	F	Monza, Italy	Monza Circuit	10 September	15:40	13:40	Hard	Italian Grand Prix
9	S	Monza, Italy	Monza Circuit	11 September	10:30	08:30	Hard	Italian Grand Prix
NC	F	(United Arab Emirates) Yas Island, Abu Dhabi	Yas Marina Circuit	12 November	11:00	7:00	Medium	Abu Dhabi Grand Prix
NC	S	(United Arab Emirates) Yas Island, Abu Dhabi	Yas Marina Circuit	13 November	13:30	9:30	Medium	Abu Dhabi Grand Prix

== Results ==
Round		Circuit	Pole position	Fastest lap	Winning driver	Winning team	Report
1	F	(Turkey) Istanbul Park	(France) Romain Grosjean	(United Kingdom) Sam Bird	(France) Romain Grosjean	(France) DAMS	Report
1	S	(Turkey) Istanbul Park		(France) Romain Grosjean	(Monaco) Stefano Coletti	(Italy) Trident Racing	Report
2	F	(Spain) Circuit de Catalunya	(Netherlands) Giedo van der Garde (Note: Jules Bianchi recorded the fastest time in qualifying, but got a ten-place penalty for disregarding yellow flags. Giedo van der Garde was recognised as the pole-sitter for the race.)	(Netherlands) Giedo van der Garde	(France) Charles Pic	(Spain) Barwa Addax Team	Report
2	S	(Spain) Circuit de Catalunya		(France) Charles Pic (Note: Charles Pic set the fastest lap, but did not finish in the top 10, so was ineligible to be the point-scorer for the fastest lap. Fabio Leimer was the point-scorer instead for setting the fastest lap of those finishing in the top 10.)	(Switzerland) Fabio Leimer	(Italy) Rapax	Report
3	F	Circuit de Monaco	(United Kingdom) Sam Bird (Note: Giedo van der Garde recorded the fastest time in qualifying, but got a five-place penalty for causing a collision. Sam Bird was recognised as the pole-sitter for the race.)	(Italy) Davide Valsecchi	(Italy) Davide Valsecchi	(Malaysia) Team AirAsia	Report
3	S	Circuit de Monaco		(United Kingdom) Sam Bird (Note: Sam Bird set the fastest lap, but did not finish in the top 10, so was ineligible to be the point-scorer for the fastest lap. Romain Grosjean was the point-scorer instead for setting the fastest lap of those finishing in the top 10.)	(France) Charles Pic	(Spain) Barwa Addax Team	Report
4	F	(Spain) Valencia Street Circuit	(France) Charles Pic (Note: Charles Pic set the fastest time in qualifying, but started the race from the pit lane after stopping in the formation lap. The pole position remained empty on the grid. Giedo van der Garde was the first driver on the grid in second place. Pic is still considered to hold the pole position.)	(France) Romain Grosjean	(France) Romain Grosjean	(France) DAMS	Report
4	S	(Spain) Valencia Street Circuit		(Monaco) Stefano Coletti (Note: Stefano Coletti set the fastest lap, but did not finish in the top 10, so was ineligible to be the point-scorer for the fastest lap. Esteban Gutiérrez was the point-scorer instead for setting the fastest lap of those finishing in the top 10.)	(Mexico) Esteban Gutiérrez	(France) Lotus ART	Report
5	F	(United Kingdom) Silverstone Circuit	(France) Jules Bianchi	(France) Romain Grosjean	(France) Jules Bianchi	(France) Lotus ART	Report
5	S	(United Kingdom) Silverstone Circuit		(Monaco) Stefano Coletti (Note: Stefano Coletti set the fastest lap, but did not finish in the top 10, so was ineligible to be the point-scorer for the fastest lap. Romain Grosjean was the point-scorer instead for setting the fastest lap of those finishing in the top 10.)	(France) Romain Grosjean	(France) DAMS	Report
6	F	(Germany) Nürburgring	(France) Charles Pic	(Italy) Luca Filippi	(Italy) Luca Filippi	(Italy) Scuderia Coloni	Report
6	S	(Germany) Nürburgring		(Germany) Christian Vietoris	(France) Romain Grosjean	(France) DAMS	Report
7	F	(Hungary) Hungaroring	(Brazil) Luiz Razia	(United Kingdom) Sam Bird (Note: Sam Bird set the fastest lap, but did not finish in the top 10, so was ineligible to be the point-scorer for the fastest lap. Luca Filippi was the point-scorer instead for setting the fastest lap of those finishing in the top 10.)	(France) Romain Grosjean	(France) DAMS	Report
7	S	(Hungary) Hungaroring		(France) Romain Grosjean	(Monaco) Stefano Coletti	(Italy) Trident Racing	Report
8	F	(Belgium) Circuit de Spa-Francorchamps	(Germany) Christian Vietoris	(Colombia) Julián Leal (Note: Julián Leal set the fastest lap, but did not finish in the top 10, so was ineligible to be the point-scorer for the fastest lap. Christian Vietoris was the point-scorer instead for setting the fastest lap of those finishing in the top 10.)	(Germany) Christian Vietoris	(Spain) Racing Engineering	Report
8	S	(Belgium) Circuit de Spa-Francorchamps		(Sweden) Marcus Ericsson (Note: Marcus Ericsson set the fastest lap, but did not finish in the top 10, so was ineligible to be the point-scorer for the fastest lap. Luca Filippi was the point-scorer instead for setting the fastest lap of those finishing in the top 10.)	(Italy) Luca Filippi	(Italy) Scuderia Coloni	Report
9	F	(Italy) Monza Circuit	(France) Charles Pic	(Italy) Luca Filippi	(Italy) Luca Filippi	(Italy) Scuderia Coloni	Report
9	S	(Italy) Monza Circuit		(Italy) Luca Filippi	(Germany) Christian Vietoris	(Spain) Racing Engineering	Report
NC	F	(United Arab Emirates) Yas Marina Circuit	(Switzerland) Fabio Leimer	(Switzerland) Fabio Leimer	(Switzerland) Fabio Leimer	(Spain) Racing Engineering	Report
NC	S	(United Arab Emirates) Yas Marina Circuit		(Brazil) Luiz Razia	(United Kingdom) James Calado	(France) Lotus ART	Report

== Championship standings ==
Scoring system

Points are awarded to the top 8 classified finishers in the Feature race, and to the top 6 classified finishers in the Sprint race. The pole-sitter in the feature race will also receive two points, and one point is given to the driver who set the fastest lap inside the top ten in both the feature and sprint races. No extra points are awarded to the pole-sitter in the sprint race.

Feature race points

Position	**1st**	**2nd**	**3rd**	**4th**	**5th**	**6th**	**7th**	**8th**	**Pole**	**FL**
Points	10	8	6	5	4	3	2	1	2	1

Sprint race points

Points are awarded to the top 6 classified finishers.

Position	**1st**	**2nd**	**3rd**	**4th**	**5th**	**6th**	**FL**
Points	6	5	4	3	2	1	1

=== Drivers' Championship ===
Pos	Driver	IST (Turkey)		CAT (Spain)		MON (Monaco)		VAL (Spain)		SIL (United Kingdom)		NÜR (Germany)		HUN (Hungary)		SPA (Belgium)		MNZ (Italy)		Points
1	(France) Romain Grosjean	**1**	10	DSQ	9	4	3	1	Ret	4	1	3	1	1	3	3	4	3	21	89
2	(Italy) Luca Filippi	Ret	14	Ret	Ret	3	4	Ret	15	13	12	1	3	6	Ret	4	1	1	5	54
3	(France) Jules Bianchi	3	7	7	Ret	Ret	19	Ret	7	**1**	5	4	2	7	6	2	2	8	3	53
4	(France) Charles Pic	7	4	1	19	8	1	**Ret**	Ret	11	10	**2**	DSQ	2	13	Ret	19	**2**	Ret	52
5	(Netherlands) Giedo van der Garde	4	2	**2**	Ret	Ret	9	2	3	8	3	6	Ret	4	4	Ret	20	21	13	49
6	(United Kingdom) Sam Bird	2	3	3	5	**Ret**	13	5	12	5	6	8	7	17	5	12	5	4	4	45
7	(Germany) Christian Vietoris	11	Ret					Ret	13	2	7	Ret	4	8	10	**1**	13	6	1	35
8	(Italy) Davide Valsecchi	16	16	4	4	1	5	3	4	14	17	13	Ret	16	14	10	10	20	Ret	30
9	(Spain) Dani Clos	8	15	6	2	Ret	18	4	5	6	2	7	Ret	10	Ret	6	6	13	7	30
10	(Sweden) Marcus Ericsson	9	8	5	3	Ret	Ret	Ret	11	3	4	5	16†	5	16	Ret	12	14	8	25
11	(Monaco) Stefano Coletti	5	1	10	20†	5	Ret	17	19†	7	22	Ret	Ret	21	1	Ret	DNS			22
12	(Brazil) Luiz Razia	6	18	Ret	Ret	Ret	20	6	2	17	14	Ret	14	**3**	7	Ret	Ret	10	9	19
13	(Mexico) Esteban Gutiérrez	Ret	11	Ret	12	12	DNS	7	1	10	8	12	Ret	Ret	2	14	7	9	6	15
14	(Switzerland) Fabio Leimer	Ret	20	8	1	9	7	Ret	14	15	11	DSQ	8	11	11	Ret	Ret	7	2	15
15	(Czech Republic) Josef Král	13	6	9	21†	6	2	8	Ret	23	20	18	11	9	17	8	3	Ret	17	15
16	(Portugal) Álvaro Parente			11	7	2	16	Ret	18	9	9	20†	Ret					12	12	8
17	(United Kingdom) Adam Carroll											15	5	19	12	9	11	5	11	6
18	(Malaysia) Fairuz Fauzy	12	5	14	6	15†	10	16	16	21	15	16	12	Ret	Ret	7	21	18	Ret	5
19	(New Zealand) Brendon Hartley															5	9	22	20	4
20	(United Kingdom) Max Chilton	Ret	17	12	11	7	6	Ret	Ret	Ret	19	17	6	18	Ret	15	16	Ret	18	4
21	(Romania) Michael Herck	14	12	Ret	Ret	13	15	10	6	24	18	11	10	12	Ret	16	15	Ret	DNS	1
22	(Germany) Kevin Mirocha	15†	19	21†	16	10	Ret	12	8	DNS	DNS	Ret	13	14	8					0
23	(Norway) Pål Varhaug	18	21	15	8	Ret	21	13	10	16	23	Ret	17	13	Ret	13	18	11	10	0
24	(Venezuela) Johnny Cecotto Jr.	Ret	13	14	13	Ret	17	14	17	12	Ret	10	Ret	Ret	Ret	11	8	17	15	0
25	(United Kingdom) Oliver Turvey					14	8													0
26	(Venezuela) Rodolfo González	Ret	22	20	10	Ret	14	15	Ret	18	13	9	15	Ret	9	Ret	17	19	16	0
27	(Colombia) Julián Leal	19	Ret	17	14	Ret	Ret	11	9	22	21	14	9	20	Ret	Ret	Ret	16	Ret	0
28	(United Kingdom) Jolyon Palmer	17	9	18	17	NC	11	9	Ret	20	16	19	Ret	22	18†	Ret	14	Ret	19	0
29	(Italy) Davide Rigon	10	Ret																	0
30	(Italy) Kevin Ceccon			19	15	11	12	18	20†	19	Ret									0
31	(Monaco) Stéphane Richelmi																	15	14	0
32	(Russia) Mikhail Aleshin	DNS	DNS	16	18									15	15	Ret	Ret			0
Pos	Driver	IST (Turkey)		CAT (Spain)		MON (Monaco)		VAL (Spain)		SIL (United Kingdom)		NÜR (Germany)		HUN (Hungary)		SPA (Belgium)		MNZ (Italy)		Points

Colour	Result
Gold	Winner
Silver	Second place
Bronze	Third place
Green	Points classification
Blue	Non-points classification
Blue	Non-classified finish (NC)
Purple	Retired, not classified (Ret)
Red	Did not qualify (DNQ)
Red	Did not pre-qualify (DNPQ)
Black	Disqualified (DSQ)
White	Did not start (DNS)
White	Withdrew (WD)
White	Race cancelled (C)
Blank	Did not practice (DNP)
Blank	Did not arrive (DNA)
Blank	Excluded (EX)

**Bold** – Pole
Italics – Fastest Lap

Notes:

- † — Drivers did not finish the race, but were classified as they completed over 90% of the race distance.

=== Teams' Championship ===
Pos	Team	No.	IST (Turkey)		CAT (Spain)		MON (Monaco)		VAL (Spain)		SIL (United Kingdom)		NÜR (Germany)		HUN (Hungary)		SPA (Belgium)		MNZ (Italy)		Points
1	(Spain) Barwa Addax Team	3	7	4	1	19	8	1	**Ret**	Ret	11	10	**2**	DSQ	2	13	Ret	19	**2**	Ret	101
1	(Spain) Barwa Addax Team	4	4	2	**2**	Ret	Ret	9	2	3	8	3	6	Ret	4	4	Ret	20	21	13	101
2	(France) DAMS	11	**1**	10	DSQ	9	4	3	1	Ret	4	1	3	1	1	3	3	4	3	21	89
2	(France) DAMS	12	18	21	15	8	Ret	21	13	10	16	23	Ret	17	13	Ret	13	18	11	10	89
3	(Spain) Racing Engineering	7	8	15	6	2	Ret	18	4	5	6	2	7	Ret	10	Ret	6	6	13	7	73
3	(Spain) Racing Engineering	8	11	Ret	11	7	2	16	Ret	13	2	7	Ret	4	8	10	**1**	13	6	1	73
4	(United Kingdom) iSport International	9	2	3	3	5	**Ret**	13	5	12	5	6	8	7	17	5	12	5	4	4	70
4	(United Kingdom) iSport International	10	9	8	5	3	Ret	Ret	Ret	11	3	4	5	16†	5	16	Ret	12	14	8	70
5	(France) Lotus ART	5	3	7	7	Ret	Ret	19	Ret	7	**1**	5	4	2	7	6	2	2	8	3	68
5	(France) Lotus ART	6	Ret	11	Ret	12	12	DNS	7	1	10	8	12	Ret	Ret	2	14	7	9	6	68
6	(Malaysia) Team AirAsia (1–3) (Malaysia) Caterham Team AirAsia (4–9)	26	6	18	Ret	Ret	Ret	20	6	2	17	14	Ret	14	**3**	7	Ret	Ret	10	9	49
6	(Malaysia) Team AirAsia (1–3) (Malaysia) Caterham Team AirAsia (4–9)	27	16	16	4	4	1	5	3	4	14	17	13	Ret	16	14	10	10	20	Ret	49
7	(Italy) Scuderia Coloni	18	14	12	Ret	Ret	13	15	10	6	24	18	11	10	12	Ret	16	15	Ret	DNS	46
7	(Italy) Scuderia Coloni	19	10	Ret	19	15	11	12	18	20†	19	Ret	1	3	6	Ret	4	1	1	5	46
8	(Italy) Trident Racing	20	Ret	22	17	10	Ret	14	15	Ret	18	13	9	15	Ret	9	Ret	17	19	16	22
8	(Italy) Trident Racing	21	5	1	10	20†	5	Ret	17	19†	7	22	Ret	Ret	21	1	Ret	DNS	15	14	22
9	(United Kingdom) Super Nova Racing	16	12	5	13	6	15†	10	16	16	21	15	16	12	Ret	Ret	7	21	18	Ret	20
9	(United Kingdom) Super Nova Racing	17	Ret	14	Ret	Ret	3	4	Ret	15	13	12	15	5	19	12	9	11	5	11	20
10	(Italy) Rapax	1	Ret	20	8	1	9	7	Ret	14	15	11	DSQ	8	11	11	Ret	Ret	7	2	15
10	(Italy) Rapax	2	19	Ret	17	14	Ret	Ret	11	9	22	21	14	9	20	Ret	Ret	Ret	16	Ret	15
11	(United Kingdom) Arden International	14	13	6	9	21†	6	2	8	Ret	23	20	18	11	9	17	8	3	Ret	17	15
11	(United Kingdom) Arden International	15	17	9	18	17	NC	11	9	Ret	20	16	19	Ret	22	18†	Ret	14	Ret	19	15
12	(Portugal) Ocean Racing Technology	22	15†	19	21†	16	10	Ret	12	8	DNS	DNS	Ret	13	14	8	5	9	22	20	4
12	(Portugal) Ocean Racing Technology	23	Ret	13	14	13	Ret	17	14	17	12	Ret	10	Ret	Ret	Ret	11	8	17	15	4
13	(United Kingdom) Carlin	24	Ret	17	12	11	7	6	Ret	Ret	Ret	19	17	6	18	Ret	15	16	Ret	18	4
13	(United Kingdom) Carlin	25	DNS	DNS	16	18	14	8	Ret	18	9	9	20†	Ret	15	15	Ret	Ret	12	12	4
Pos	Team	No.	IST (Turkey)		CAT (Spain)		MON (Monaco)		VAL (Spain)		SIL (United Kingdom)		NÜR (Germany)		HUN (Hungary)		SPA (Belgium)		MNZ (Italy)		Points

Key
Colour	Result
Gold	Winner
Silver	2nd place
Bronze	3rd place
Green	Other points position
Blue	Other classified position
Blue	Not classified, finished (NC)
Purple	Not classified, retired (Ret)
Red	Did not qualify (DNQ)
Red	Did not pre-qualify (DNPQ)
Black	Disqualified (DSQ)
White	Did not start (DNS)
White	Race cancelled (C)
Blank	Did not practice (DNP)
Blank	Excluded (EX)
Blank	Did not arrive (DNA)
Blank	Withdrawn (WD)
Text formatting	Meaning
**Bold**	Pole position point(s)
Italics	Fastest lap point(s)

Notes:

- † — Drivers did not finish the race, but were classified as they completed over 90% of the race distance.
