= Super Nova Racing =

British auto racing team

(United Kingdom) Super Nova Racing
- Founded: 1991
- Founder(s): Nozomu Saruhashi; David Sears
- Folded: 2015
- Base: Griston, Norfolk, England
- Team principal(s): David Sears
- Former series: Auto GP; Formula E (Note: Operation Team at Trulli GP team); Formula 3000; A1 Grand Prix (Note: Operation Team at A1 Team Brazil, A1 Team Germany, A1 Team New Zealand, A1 Team Pakistan); GP2 Series; GP2 Asia Series
- Teams' Championships: International Formula 3000: 2000; A1 Grand Prix: 2006-07; Auto GP: 2012, 2013
- Drivers' Championships: International Formula 3000: 1995: Vincenzo Sospiri; 1997: Ricardo Zonta; 1998: Juan Pablo Montoya; 2002: Sébastien Bourdais; Auto GP: 2012: Adrian Quaife-Hobbs; 2013: Vittorio Ghirelli
- Website: http://www.supernovainternational.com/

Super Nova Racing was a British racing team that has competed in Formula 3000/GP2 and the A1 Grand Prix series.

== History ==
Super Nova first entered racing in 1991. Super Nova was a new incarnation of the pre-existing David Sears Motorsport, sponsored by the Nova chain of Japanese English schools and also ran the Danish Den Blå Avis outfit.

In July 2007, naming sponsor Nova's legal problems became the subject of intense media coverage in Japan, and by the end of September 2007 the company was reported to be unable to pay staff salaries or rent, being declared bankrupt in November 2007 amidst a widening scandal about business improprieties, but SuperNova continued to list Nova as a sponsor. On 24 June 2008, President Saruhashi of the Nova chain of English schools was taken into police custody and faced charges of embezzlement. In August 2009, Saruhashi was convicted and sentenced to a 42-month jail term.

== Racing history ==
=== Formula 3000 ===
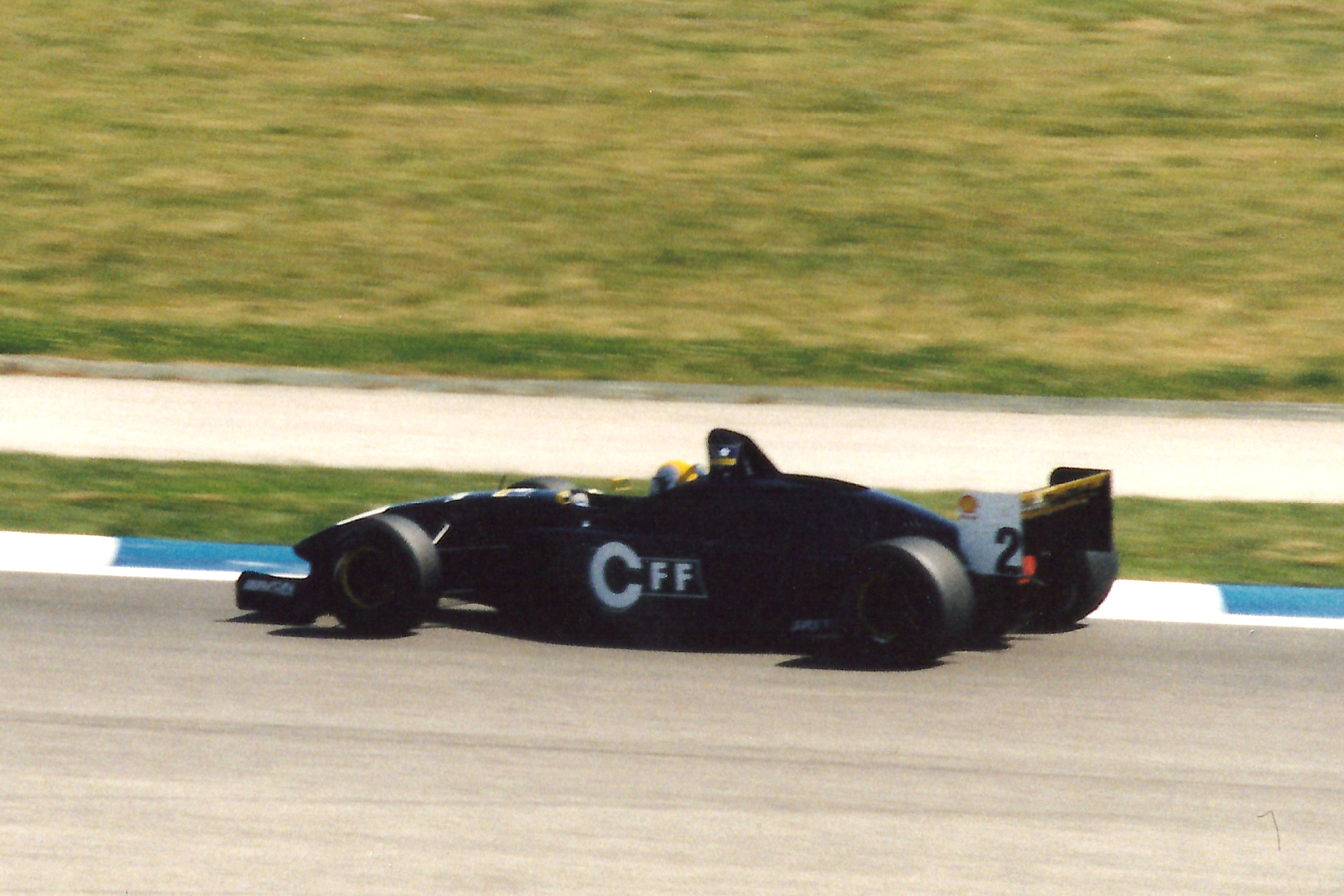
Boris Derichebourg driving in the F3000 race for Super Nova Racing at the Circuit de Catalunya in 1998.

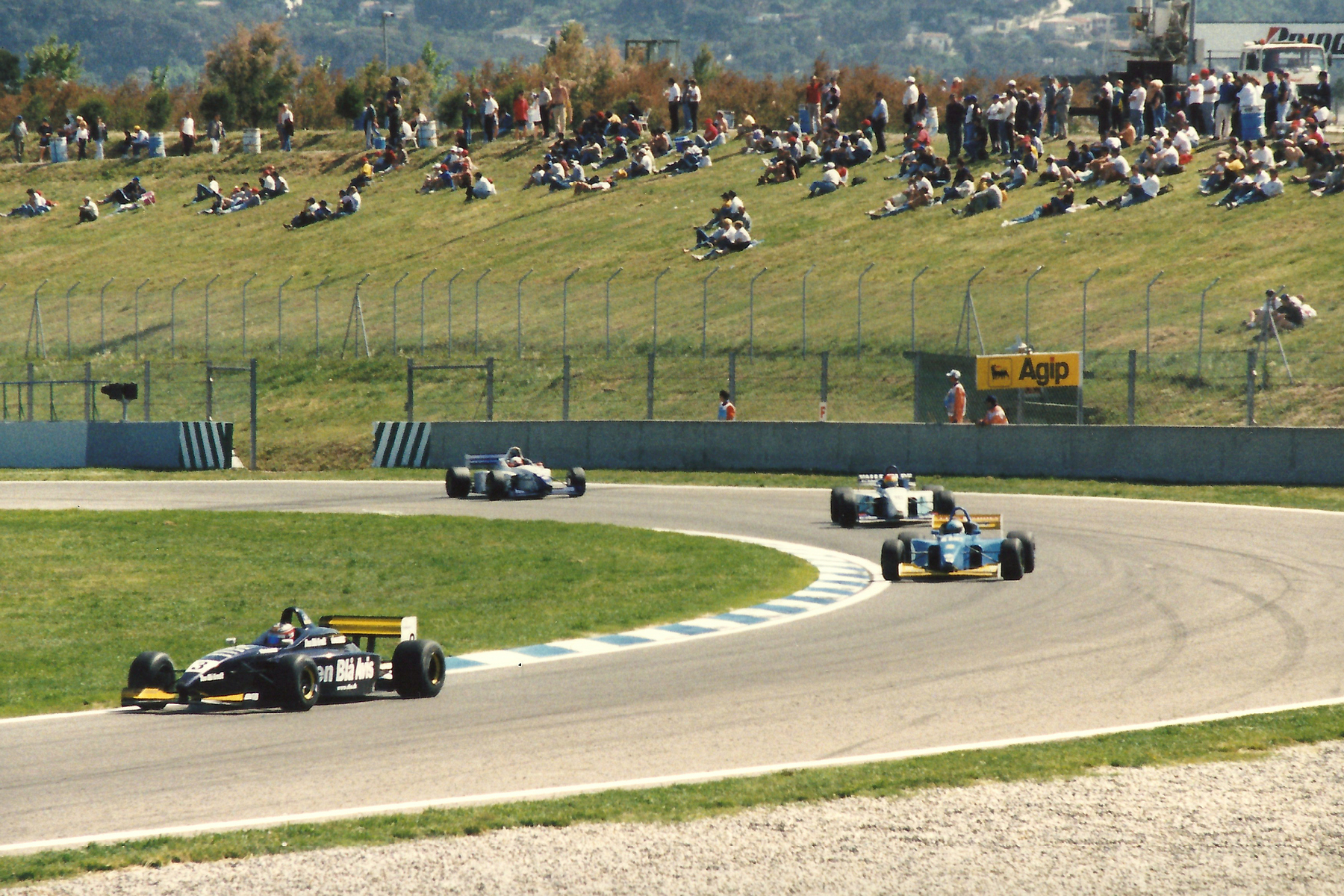
Jason Watt driving for Den Blå Avis (Super Nova Racing) during the Formula 3000 race at the Circuit de Catalunya in 1998.

Super Nova Racing but he made the international leap in 1994 when he appeared in the European Formula 3000. From that moment on he remained in that championship, managing to win the following year with the drivers Vincenzo Sospiri and Ricardo Rosset who obtained first and second place in the championship respectively. Between 1997 and 1998 Super Nova Racing had two of the most outstanding drivers in motorsports, Ricardo Zonta and Juan Pablo Montoya, while in the 2001 season they would have the Australian Mark Webber with whom they would achieve the runner-up position.

=== A1 Grand Prix ===
They have competed for all seasons in A1 Grand Prix since series debuts in 2005-06, fielding entries for both A1 Team Germany and A1 Team Pakistan and later for A1 Team New Zealand. In 2006-07, the both managed team, Germany and New Zealand finishing 1st and 2nd in the Championship overall.

=== GP2 Series ===
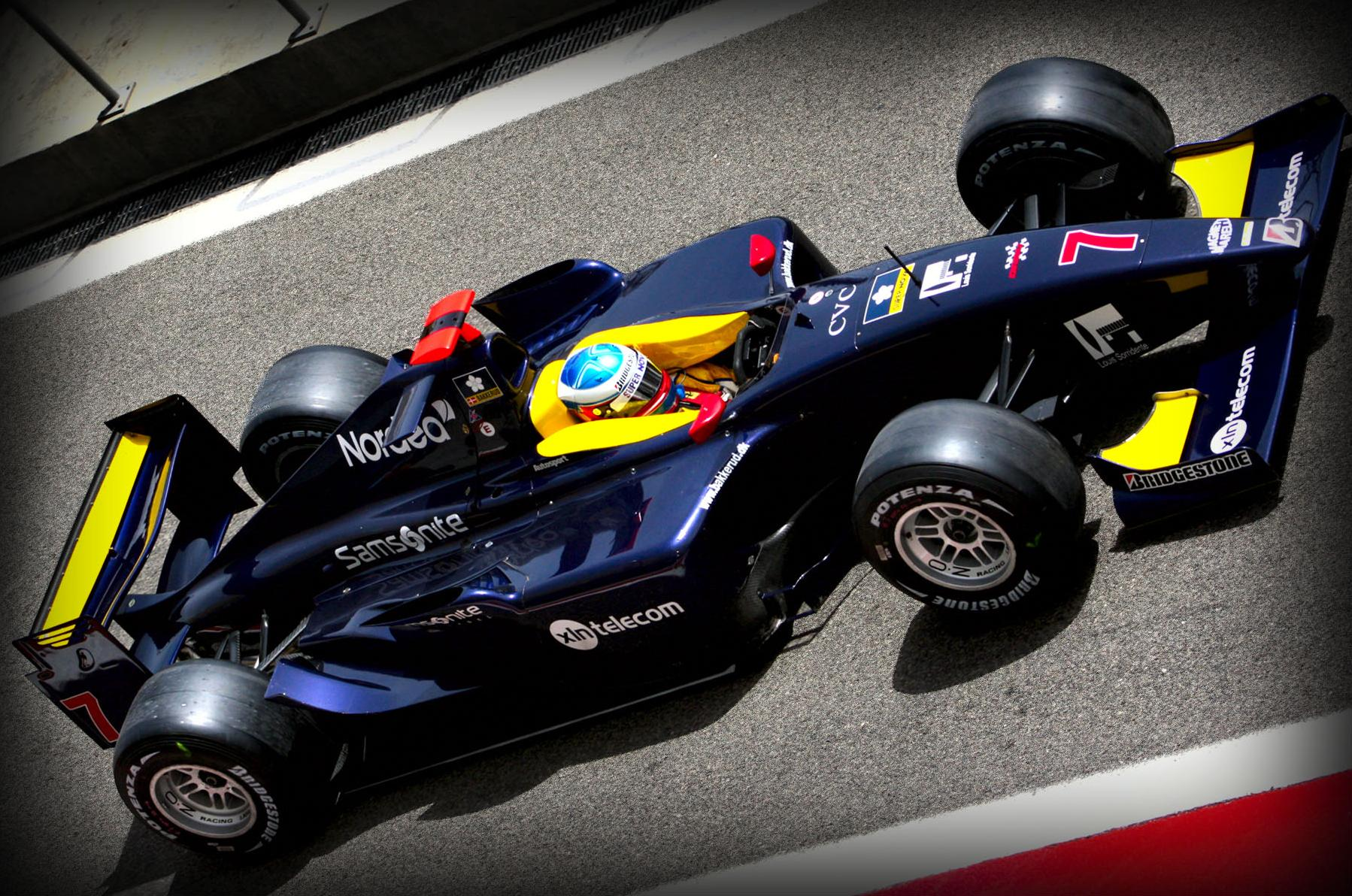
Christian Bakkerud driving for Super Nova in the 2008 Bahrain GP2 Asia Series round.

With the arrival of GP2 it had the drivers Giorgio Pantano and Adam Carroll who would achieve two victories that would leave the team in third place in the constructors' table in the 2005 season. For the 2006 season they hired the Argentine José María López and the Malaysian Fairuz Fauzy, leaving Super Nova Racing in ninth place at the end of the championship. For the 2007 season its drivers were the British Mike Conway and the Italian Luca Filippi, achieving fourth position in the constructors' championship.

In 2008 he hired the services of the Portuguese Álvaro Parente and the Danish Christian Bakkerud but in the first round of the championship Bakkerud was injured, which caused them to hire the Spanish driver Andy Soucek as a replacement, who continued until the end of the season. With these two drivers they finished the constructors' championship in seventh position. In 2009 they had the Italian Luca Filippi, who had already been on the team previously, and the Spanish Javier Villa. They finished in the championship in 3rd place with 67 points. In 2010 they will participate with the Czech Josef Král and the Swede Marcus Ericsson. In 2011 they finished ninth with 20 points.

In February 2012, it was announced that Super Nova would withdraw from the GP2 Series due to not being able to cope with its economic situation and is replaced by the Team Lazarus team.

=== Auto GP ===
In 2010 they competed in the Auto GP and in the following season (2011) they managed to finish fourth in the championship, despite only competing half of the season with a single car. In 2012, they are declared winners of the team championship thanks to Adrian Quaiffe-Hobbs, who also takes the drivers' championship.

=== Formula E ===
On 1 July 2014 Super Nova announced that it will be competing in the FIA Formula E Championship under the Trulli GP name.

== Complete series results ==
=== Auto GP ===
Auto GP Results
Year	Car	Drivers	Races	Wins	Poles	F.L.	Points	D.C.	T.C.
2010	Lola B05/52–Zytek	(New Zealand) Jonny Reid	12	0	1	0	16	10th	**3rd**
2010	Lola B05/52–Zytek	(Italy) Giorgio Pantano	6	0	0	0	7	13th	**3rd**
2010	Lola B05/52–Zytek	(United States) Jake Rosenzweig	2	0	0	0	5	17th	**3rd**
2010	Lola B05/52–Zytek	(Italy) Luca Filippi	4	1	0	1	10	5th	**3rd**
2011	Lola B05/52–Zytek	(South Africa) Adrian Zaugg	2	0	0	1	3	19th	4th
2011	Lola B05/52–Zytek	(United Kingdom) Jon Lancaster	4	1	0	1	51	11th	4th
2011	Lola B05/52–Zytek	(Italy) Luca Filippi	12	1	1	4	127	**2nd**	4th
2012	Lola B05/52–Zytek	(United Kingdom) Adrian Quaife-Hobbs	14	5	6	4	221	**1st**	**1st**
2012	Lola B05/52–Zytek	(Brazil) Victor Guerin	10	0	0	0	46	8th	**1st**

=== GP2 Series ===
Year	Car	Drivers	Races	Wins	Poles	F.L.	Points	D.C.	T.C.
2005	Dallara GP2/05–Mecachrome	(Italy) Giorgio Pantano	23	0	1	0	49	6th	**3rd**
2005	Dallara GP2/05–Mecachrome	(United Kingdom) Adam Carroll	23	3	0	2	53	5th	**3rd**
2006	Dallara GP2/05–Mecachrome	(Argentina) José María López	21	0	1	1	30	10th	8th
2006	Dallara GP2/05–Mecachrome	(Malaysia) Fairuz Fauzy	21	0	0	0	0	24th	8th
2007	Dallara GP2/05–Mecachrome	(Italy) Luca Filippi	21	1	2	0	59	4th	4th
2007	Dallara GP2/05–Mecachrome	(United Kingdom) Mike Conway	21	0	0	1	19	14th	4th
2008	Dallara GP2/08–Mecachrome	(Denmark) Christian Bakkerud	3	0	0	0	0	27th	7th
2008	Dallara GP2/08–Mecachrome	(Spain) Andy Soucek	16	0	0	0	14 (Note: Andy Soucek scored 1 of his 14 points in 2 races for David Price Racing.)	14th	7th
2008	Dallara GP2/08–Mecachrome	(Portugal) Álvaro Parente	20	1	0	1	34	8th	7th
2009	Dallara GP2/08–Mecachrome	(Italy) Luca Filippi	20	1	0	3	40	5th	**3rd**
2009	Dallara GP2/08–Mecachrome	(Spain) Javier Villa	20	0	0	0	27	10th	**3rd**
2010	Dallara GP2/08–Mecachrome	(Czech Republic) Josef Král	10	0	0	0	3	24th	9th
2010	Dallara GP2/08–Mecachrome	(Italy) Luca Filippi	10	0	0	0	5	20th	9th
2010	Dallara GP2/08–Mecachrome	(Sweden) Marcus Ericsson	20	1	0	0	11	17th	9th
2011	Dallara GP2/11–Mecachrome	(Malaysia) Fairuz Fauzy	18	0	0	0	5	18th	9th
2011	Dallara GP2/11–Mecachrome	(Italy) Luca Filippi	10	0	0	0	9	**2nd** (Note: Luca Filippi also scored 45 points for Scuderia Coloni in 8 races.)	9th
2011	Dallara GP2/11–Mecachrome	(United Kingdom) Adam Carroll	8	0	0	0	6	17th	9th

=== In detail ===
(key) (Races in bold indicate pole position) (Races in italics indicate fastest lap)

Year	Chassis Engine Tyres	Drivers	1	2	3	4	5	6	7	8	9	10	11	12	13	14	15	16	17	18	19	20	21	22	23	T.C.	Points
2005	GP2/05; Renault; **B**		SMR; FEA	SMR; SPR	CAT; FEA	CAT; SPR	MON; FEA	NÜR; FEA	NÜR; SPR	MAG; FEA	MAG; SPR	SIL; FEA	SIL; SPR	HOC; FEA	HOC; SPR	HUN; FEA	HUN; SPR	IST; FEA	IST; SPR	MNZ; FEA	MNZ; SPR	SPA; FEA	SPA; SPR	BHR; FEA	BHR; SPR	3rd	102
2005	GP2/05; Renault; **B**	(Italy) Giorgio Pantano	13^{†}	Ret	13	14	Ret	**2**	7	10	7	12	7	6	2	3	3	2	8	6	3	NC	11	5	5	3rd	102
2005	GP2/05; Renault; **B**	(United Kingdom) Adam Carroll	5	1	7	6	1	Ret	2	4	6	21^{†}	8	Ret	11	9	9	7	2	5	6	8	1	9	8	3rd	102
2006	GP2/05; Renault; **B**		VAL; FEA	VAL; SPR	SMR; FEA	SMR; SPR	NÜR; FEA	NÜR; SPR	CAT; FEA	CAT; SPR	MON; FEA	SIL; FEA	SIL; SPR	MAG; FEA	MAG; SPR	HOC; FEA	HOC; SPR	HUN; FEA	HUN; SPR	IST; FEA	IST; SPR	MNZ; FEA	MNZ; SPR			8th	30
2006	GP2/05; Renault; **B**	(Argentina) José María López	5	Ret	Ret	19^{†}	4	3	Ret	Ret	NC	Ret	14	**3**	Ret	7	2	8	Ret	9	11	Ret	Ret			8th	30
2006	GP2/05; Renault; **B**	(Malaysia) Fairuz Fauzy	15	10	Ret	15	19	9	Ret	14	10	12	7	Ret	15	22	10	16	Ret	Ret	Ret	14	10			8th	30
2007	GP2/05; Renault; **B**		BHR; FEA	BHR; SPR	CAT; FEA	CAT; SPR	MON; FEA	MAG; FEA	MAG; SPR	SIL; FEA	SIL; SPR	NÜR; FEA	NÜR; SPR	HUN; FEA	HUN; SPR	IST; FEA	IST; SPR	MNZ; FEA	MNZ; SPR	SPA; FEA	SPA; SPR	VAL; FEA	VAL; SPR			4th	78
2007	GP2/05; Renault; **B**	(Italy) Luca Filippi	**1**	3	Ret	11	4	4	2	5	7	Ret	Ret	Ret	16	**Ret**	7	2	2	2	7	18^{†}	6			4th	78
2007	GP2/05; Renault; **B**	(United Kingdom) Mike Conway	Ret	5	Ret	12	Ret	9	Ret	2	5	18	15	Ret	8	Ret	Ret	Ret	9	5	5	16	9			4th	78
2008	GP2/08; Renault; **B**		CAT; FEA	CAT; SPR	IST; FEA	IST; SPR	MON; FEA	MON; FEA	MAG; FEA	MAG; SPR	SIL; FEA	SIL; SPR	HOC; FEA	HOC; SPR	HUN; FEA	HUN; SPR	VAL; FEA	VAL; SPR	SPA; FEA	SPA; SPR	MNZ; FEA	MNZ; SPR				7th	47
2008	GP2/08; Renault; **B**	(Denmark) Christian Bakkerud	Ret	DNS			10	Ret																		7th	47
2008	GP2/08; Renault; **B**	(Spain) Andy Soucek			19	Ret			13	Ret	12	Ret	7	Ret	8	2	7	Ret	6	Ret	9	18				7th	47
2008	GP2/08; Renault; **B**	(Portugal) Álvaro Parente	1	7	Ret	8	5	3	9	Ret	16	Ret	3	6	16	Ret	16^{†}	Ret	2	Ret	Ret	12				7th	47
2009	GP2/08; Renault; **B**		CAT; FEA	CAT; SPR	MON; FEA	MON; FEA	IST; FEA	IST; SPR	SIL; FEA	SIL; SPR	NÜR; FEA	NÜR; SPR	HUN; FEA	HUN; SPR	VAL; FEA	VAL; SPR	SPA; FEA	SPA; SPR	MNZ; FEA	MNZ; SPR	ALG; FEA	ALG; SPR				3rd	67
2009	GP2/08; Renault; **B**	(Italy) Luca Filippi	4	7	Ret	NC	2	Ret	14	16	Ret	18^{†}	6	2	7	Ret	Ret	Ret	Ret	Ret	2	1				3rd	67
2009	GP2/08; Renault; **B**	(Spain) Javier Villa	10	Ret	10	8	7	2	Ret	15	5	6	3	5	18^{†}	9	13	10	7	10	13	2				3rd	67
2010	GP2/08; Renault; **B**		CAT; FEA	CAT; SPR	MON; FEA	MON; SPR	IST; FEA	IST; SPR	VAL; FEA	VAL; SPR	SIL; FEA	SIL; SPR	HOC; FEA	HOC; SPR	HUN; FEA	HUN; SPR	SPA; FEA	SPA; SPR	MNZ; FEA	MNZ; SPR	YMC; FEA	YMC; SPR				9th	19
2010	GP2/08; Renault; **B**	(Czech Republic) Josef Král	12	19	13	8	15	14	Ret	Ret											8	5				9th	19
2010	GP2/08; Renault; **B**	(Italy) Luca Filippi									20	9	10	7	14	6	5	Ret	Ret	14						9th	19
2010	GP2/08; Renault; **B**	(Sweden) Marcus Ericsson	11	Ret	12	9	Ret	Ret	7	1	12	18	6	Ret	12	10	13	7	Ret	11	11	Ret				9th	19
2011	GP2/11; Mecachrome; **P**		IST; FEA	IST; SPR	CAT; FEA	CAT; SPR	MON; FEA	MON; SPR	VAL; FEA	VAL; SPR	SIL; FEA	SIL; SPR	NÜR; FEA	NÜR; SPR	HUN; FEA	HUN; SPR	SPA; FEA	SPA; SPR	MNZ; FEA	MNZ; SPR						9th	20
2011	GP2/11; Mecachrome; **P**	(Malaysia) Fairuz Fauzy	12	5	14	6	15^{†}	10	16	16	21	15	16	12	Ret	Ret	7	21	18	Ret						9th	20
2011	GP2/11; Mecachrome; **P**	(Italy) Luca Filippi	Ret	14	Ret	Ret	3	4	Ret	15	13	12														9th	20
2011	GP2/11; Mecachrome; **P**	(United Kingdom) Adam Carroll											15	5	19	12	9	11	5	11						9th	20

=== GP2 Final ===
(key) (Races in bold indicate pole position) (Races in italics indicate fastest lap)

Year	Chassis Engine Tyres	Drivers	1	2	T.C.	Points
2011	GP2/11; Mecachrome; **P**		YMC; FEA	YMC; SPR	9th	0
2011	GP2/11; Mecachrome; **P**	(Italy) Giacomo Ricci	11	23	9th	0
2011	GP2/11; Mecachrome; **P**	(Italy) Fabio Onidi	18	11	9th	0

=== GP2 Asia Series ===
Year	Car	Drivers	Races	Wins	Poles	F.L.	Points	D.C.	T.C.
2008	Dallara GP2/08–Mecachrome	(Denmark) Christian Bakkerud	10	0	0	0	0	27th	6th
2008	Dallara GP2/08–Mecachrome	(Malaysia) Fairuz Fauzy	10	1	0	1	24	4th	6th
2008-09	Dallara GP2/08–Mecachrome	(Spain) Javier Villa	11	0	0	1	12	10th	7th
2008-09	Dallara GP2/08–Mecachrome	(United Kingdom) James Jakes	11	0	0	1	7	16th	7th
2009-10	Dallara GP2/08–Mecachrome	(United Kingdom) James Jakes	2	0	0	0	6	14th	6th
2009-10	Dallara GP2/08–Mecachrome	(Sweden) Marcus Ericsson	2	0	0	0	0	24th	6th
2009-10	Dallara GP2/08–Mecachrome	(United States) Jake Rosenzweig	4	0	0	0	0	30th	6th
2009-10	Dallara GP2/08–Mecachrome	(Czech Republic) Josef Král	8	0	0	0	8	11th	6th
2011	Dallara GP2/11–Mecachrome	(Malaysia) Fairuz Fauzy	4	0	0	0	1	14th	11th
2011	Dallara GP2/11–Mecachrome	(Venezuela) Johnny Cecotto Jr.	4	0	0	0	0	15th	11th

=== In detail ===
(key) (Races in bold indicate pole position) (Races in italics indicate fastest lap)

Year	Chassis Engine Tyres	Drivers	1	2	3	4	5	6	7	8	9	10	11	12	T.C.	Points
2008	GP2/05; Renault; **B**		DUB1; FEA	DUB1; SPR	SEN; FEA	SEN; SPR	SEP; FEA	SEP; SPR	BHR; FEA	BHR; SPR	DUB2; FEA	DUB2; SPR			6th	24
2008	GP2/05; Renault; **B**	(Denmark) Christian Bakkerud	Ret	11	Ret	14	Ret	DNS	Ret	Ret	Ret	9			6th	24
2008	GP2/05; Renault; **B**	(Malaysia) Fairuz Fauzy	8	2	8	1	2	6	Ret	Ret	11	6			6th	24
2008–09	GP2/05; Renault; **B**		SHI; FEA	SHI; SPR	DUB3; FEA	DUB3; SPR	BHR1; FEA	BHR1; SPR	LSL; FEA	LSL; SPR	SEP; FEA	SEP; SPR	BHR2; FEA	BHR2; SPR	7th	19
2008–09	GP2/05; Renault; **B**	(Spain) Javier Villa	4	3	9	C	9	5	13	10	19	18	15	12	7th	19
2008–09	GP2/05; Renault; **B**	(United Kingdom) James Jakes	Ret	11	12	C	22	Ret	9	9	3	Ret	10	14	7th	19
2009–10	GP2/05; Renault; **B**		YMC1; FEA	YMC1; SPR	YMC2; FEA	YMC2; SPR	BHR1; FEA	BHR1; SPR	BHR2; FEA	BHR2; SPR					6th	14
2009–10	GP2/05; Renault; **B**	(United Kingdom) James Jakes	3	10											6th	14
2009–10	GP2/05; Renault; **B**	(Sweden) Marcus Ericsson			17^{†}	12									6th	14
2009–10	GP2/05; Renault; **B**	(United States) Jake Rosenzweig					19	14	17	17					6th	14
2009–10	GP2/05; Renault; **B**	(Czech Republic) Josef Král	Ret	Ret	16	20	22	16	Ret	18					6th	14
2011	GP2/11; Mecachrome; **P**		YMC; FEA	YMC; SPR	IMO; FEA	IMO; SPR									11th	1
2011	GP2/11; Mecachrome; **P**	(Malaysia) Fairuz Fauzy	Ret	15	8	Ret									11th	1
2011	GP2/11; Mecachrome; **P**	(Venezuela) Johnny Cecotto Jr.	15	7	15	19^{†}									11th	1

=== Formula 3000 ===
International Formula 3000 Championship Results
Year	Car	Drivers	Races	Wins	Poles	F.L.	Points	D.C.	T.C.
1994	Reynard 94D–Cosworth	(Italy) Vincenzo Sospiri	8	0	0	1	24	4th	4th
1994	Reynard 94D–Cosworth	(Japan) Taki Inoue	8	0	0	0	0	NC	4th
1995	Reynard–Cosworth	(Italy) Vincenzo Sospiri	8	3	0	0	42	**1st**	**1st**
1995	Reynard–Cosworth	(Brazil) Ricardo Rosset	8	2	1	2	29	**2nd**	**1st**
1996	Lola T96/50–Zytek Judd	(Sweden) Kenny Bräck	10	3	3	3	49	**2nd**	**1st**
1996	Lola T96/50–Zytek Judd	(Brazil) Marcos Gueiros	10	0	0	0	20	5th	**1st**
1997	Lola T96/50–Zytek Judd	(Brazil) Ricardo Zonta	10	3	4	4	39	**1st**	**1st**
1997	Lola T96/50–Zytek Judd	(France) Laurent Rédon	10	0	0	0	10	9th	**1st**
1998	Lola T96/50–Zytek Judd	(Colombia) Juan Pablo Montoya	12	4	7	5	65	**1st**	**1st**
1998	Lola T96/50–Zytek Judd	(France) Boris Derichebourg	12	0	0	0	5	12th	**1st**
1999	Lola B99/50–Zytek	(Brazil) Ricardo Maurício	3	0	0	0	0	21st	**2nd**
1999	Lola B99/50–Zytek	(Belgium) David Saelens	6	0	0	0	8	9th	**2nd**
1999	Lola B99/50–Zytek	(Denmark) Jason Watt	10	2	1	0	30	**2nd**	**2nd**
2000	Lola B99/50–Zytek	(France) Nicolas Minassian	10	3	0	0	45	**2nd**	**1st**
2000	Lola B99/50–Zytek	(Belgium) David Saelens	10	0	2	0	15	6th	**1st**
2001	Lola B99/50–Zytek	(Australia) Mark Webber	12	3	2	3	39	**2nd**	**3rd**
2001	Lola B99/50–Zytek	(Brazil) Mario Haberfeld	12	0	0	1	3	15th	**3rd**
2002	Lola B02/50–Zytek Judd	(France) Sébastien Bourdais	12	3	6	3	56	**1st**	**3rd**
2002	Lola B02/50–Zytek Judd	(Portugal) Tiago Monteiro	12	0	0	0	2	13th	**3rd**
2003	Lola B02/50–Zytek Judd	(Italy) Enrico Toccacelo	10	1	0	0	30	6th	5th
2003	Lola B02/50–Zytek Judd	(United States) Derek Hill	6	0	0	0	4	16th	5th
2003	Lola B02/50–Zytek Judd	(Denmark) Nicolas Kiesa	1	0	0	0	1	7th	5th
2003	Lola B02/50–Zytek Judd	(United Kingdom) Sam Hancock	2	0	0	0	0	NC	5th
2004	Lola B02/50–Zytek Judd	(Austria) Patrick Friesacher	4	0	0	0	9	5th	8th
2004	Lola B02/50–Zytek Judd	(Belgium) Jeffrey van Hooydonk	6	0	0	0	2	11th	8th
2004	Lola B02/50–Zytek Judd	(South Africa) Alan van der Merwe	7	0	0	0	2	14th	8th
2004	Lola B02/50–Zytek Judd	(Turkey) Can Artam	3	0	0	0	0	NC	8th

=== A1 Grand Prix ===
A1 Grand Prix results
Year	Car	Team	Races	Wins	Poles	F.L.	Points	T.C.
2005–06	Lola B05/52–Zytek	A1 Team Germany	22	0	0	0	38	15th
2005–06	Lola B05/52–Zytek	A1 Team Pakistan	16	0	0	0	10	20th
2006–07	Lola B05/52–Zytek	A1 Team Germany	22	9	3	3	128	**1st**
2006–07	Lola B05/52–Zytek	A1 Team New Zealand	22	3	2	2	93	**2nd**
2007–08	Lola B05/52–Zytek	A1 Team Germany	20	2	1	1	83	8th
2007–08	Lola B05/52–Zytek	A1 Team New Zealand	20	4	2	1	127	**2nd**
2008–09	Ferrari A1 08	A1 Team Brazil	11	0	0	0	18	15th
2008–09	Ferrari A1 08	A1 Team New Zealand	14	0	0	0	36	7th

== Timeline ==
Former series
All-Japan Formula Three Championship	1992–1993
International Formula 3000	1994–2004
GP2 Series	2005–2011
A1 Grand Prix	2005–2009
GP2 Asia Series	2008–2011
Auto GP	2010–2014
Formula E	2014–2015

== Notes ==
Achievements
Preceded by none	International Formula 3000 Teams' Champion; 2000	Succeeded by Nordic Racing
Preceded by DAMS	Auto GP Teams' Champion; 2012-2014	Succeeded by Torino Squadra Corse
