= 2011 Hungaroring GP2 Series round =

2011 Hungaroring motor race (Hungarian Grand Prix)

(Hungary) 2011 Hungarian GP2 round
Round details
- Round 7 of 9 rounds in the 2011 GP2 Series
- Location: Hungaroring, Mogyoród, Pest, Hungary
- Course: Permanent racing facility 4.381 km (2.724 mi)

GP2 Series

Feature race
- Date: 30 July 2011
- Laps: 38 (39 scheduled)

Pole position
Driver	(Brazil) Luiz Razia	Caterham Team AirAsia
- Time: 1:30.411

Podium
First	(France) Romain Grosjean	DAMS
Second	(France) Charles Pic	Barwa Addax Team
Third	(Brazil) Luiz Razia	Caterham Team AirAsia

Fastest lap
Driver	(United Kingdom) Sam Bird	iSport International
- Time: 1:32.950 (on lap 32)

Sprint race
- Date: 31 July 2011
- Laps: 23 (28 scheduled)

Podium
First	(Monaco) Stefano Coletti	Trident Racing
Second	(Mexico) Esteban Gutiérrez	Lotus ART
Third	(France) Romain Grosjean	DAMS

Fastest lap
Driver	(France) Romain Grosjean	DAMS
- Time: 1:47.730 (on lap 13)

The 2011 Hungarian GP2 round was a GP2 Series motor race held on July 30 and 31, 2011 at Hungaroring, Hungary. It was the seventh round of the 2011 GP2 season. The race supported the 2011 Hungarian Grand Prix.

== Classification ==
=== Qualifying ===
Pos	No.	Driver	Team	Time	Grid
1	26	(Brazil) Luiz Razia	Caterham Team AirAsia	1:30.411	1
2	19	(Italy) Luca Filippi	Scuderia Coloni	1:30.551	2
3	10	(Sweden) Marcus Ericsson	iSport International	1:30.557	3
4	3	(France) Charles Pic	Barwa Addax Team	1:30.742	4
5	11	(France) Romain Grosjean	DAMS	1:30.746	5
6	5	(France) Jules Bianchi	Lotus ART	1:30.752	6
7	4	(Netherlands) Giedo van der Garde	Barwa Addax Team	1:30.760	7
8	1	(Switzerland) Fabio Leimer	Rapax	1:30.803	8
9	6	(Mexico) Esteban Gutiérrez	Lotus ART	1:30.826	9
10	9	(United Kingdom) Sam Bird	iSport International	1:30.890	10
11	24	(United Kingdom) Max Chilton	Carlin	1:30.935	11
12	14	(Czech Republic) Josef Král	Arden International	1:30.936	12
13	8	(Germany) Christian Vietoris	Racing Engineering	1:30.974	13
14	27	(Italy) Davide Valsecchi	Caterham Team AirAsia	1:31.080	26^{1}
15	18	(Romania) Michael Herck	Scuderia Coloni	1:31.122	14
16	17	(United Kingdom) Adam Carroll	Super Nova Racing	1:31.175	18^{2}
17	21	(Monaco) Stefano Coletti	Trident Racing	1.31.229	15
18	7	(Spain) Dani Clos	Racing Engineering	1:31.239	16
19	25	(Russia) Mikhail Aleshin	Carlin	1:31.312	17
20	12	(Norway) Pål Varhaug	DAMS	1:31.396	19
21	15	(United Kingdom) Jolyon Palmer	Arden International	1:31.513	20
22	22	(Germany) Kevin Mirocha	Ocean Racing Technology	1:31.541	21
23	2	(Colombia) Julián Leal	Rapax	1:31.542	22
24	23	(Venezuela) Johnny Cecotto Jr.	Ocean Racing Technology	1:31.578	23
25	16	(Malaysia) Fairuz Fauzy	Super Nova Racing	1:31.755	24
26	20	(Venezuela) Rodolfo González	Trident Racing	1:31.779	25

Notes

- ^1 – Valsecchi was given a ten place grid penalty for Feature Race after causing a collision during Nürburgring Sprint Race and also a three place penalty for impeding Grosjean during the qualifying session.
- ^2 – Carroll was handed a three place grid penalty for impeding Coletti during the qualifying session.

=== Feature Race ===
Pos	No.	Driver	Team	Laps	Time/Retired	Grid	Points
1	11	(France) Romain Grosjean	DAMS	38	1:00:36.334	5	10
2	3	(France) Charles Pic	Barwa Addax Team	38	+2.641	4	8
3	26	(Brazil) Luiz Razia	Caterham Team AirAsia	38	+8.107	1	6+2
4	4	(Netherlands) Giedo van der Garde	Barwa Addax Team	38	+15.161	7	5
5	10	(Sweden) Marcus Ericsson	iSport International	38	+18.864	3	4
6	19	(Italy) Luca Filippi	Scuderia Coloni	38	+21.636	2	3+1
7	5	(France) Jules Bianchi	Lotus ART	38	+24.891	6	2
8	8	(Germany) Christian Vietoris	Racing Engineering	38	+35.059	13	1
9	14	(Czech Republic) Josef Král	Arden International	38	+43.516	12	
10	7	(Spain) Dani Clos	Racing Engineering	38	+46.289	16	
11	1	(Switzerland) Fabio Leimer	Rapax	38	+46.685	8	
12	18	(Romania) Michael Herck	Scuderia Coloni	38	+51.910	14	
13	12	(Norway) Pål Varhaug	DAMS	38	+52.107	19	
14	22	(Germany) Kevin Mirocha	Ocean Racing Technology	38	+52.826	21	
15	25	(Russia) Mikhail Aleshin	Carlin	38	+53.120	17	
16	27	(Italy) Davide Valsecchi	Caterham Team AirAsia	38	+53.335	26	
17	9	(United Kingdom) Sam Bird	iSport International	38	+56.655	10	
18	24	(United Kingdom) Max Chilton	Carlin	38	+56.776	11	
19	17	(United Kingdom) Adam Carroll	Super Nova Racing	38	+57.839	18	
20	2	(Colombia) Julián Leal	Rapax	38	+58.286	22	
21	21	(Monaco) Stefano Coletti	Trident Racing	38	+1:10.982	15	
22	15	(United Kingdom) Jolyon Palmer	Arden International	37	+1 lap	20	
Ret	20	(Venezuela) Rodolfo González	Trident Racing	21	Gearbox	25	
Ret	6	(Mexico) Esteban Gutiérrez	Lotus ART	4	Electrical	9	
Ret	23	(Venezuela) Johnny Cecotto Jr.	Ocean Racing Technology	0	Collision	23	
Ret	16	(Malaysia) Fairuz Fauzy	Super Nova Racing	0	Collision	24	
Fastest lap: Sam Bird (iSport International) 1:32.950 (lap 32)

=== Sprint Race ===
Pos	No.	Driver	Team	Laps	Time/Retired	Grid	Points
1	21	(Monaco) Stefano Coletti	Trident Racing	23	45:53.864	21	6
2	6	(Mexico) Esteban Gutiérrez	Lotus ART	23	+7.293	24	5
3	11	(France) Romain Grosjean	DAMS	23	+7.401	8	4+1
4	4	(Netherlands) Giedo van der Garde	Barwa Addax Team	23	+11.595	5	3
5	9	(United Kingdom) Sam Bird	iSport International	23	+14.524	17	2
6	5	(France) Jules Bianchi	Lotus ART	23	+16.646	2	1
7	26	(Brazil) Luiz Razia	Caterham Team AirAsia	23	+17.153	6	
8	22	(Germany) Kevin Mirocha	Ocean Racing Technology	23	+17.840	14	
9	20	(Venezuela) Rodolfo González	Trident Racing	23	+19.602	23	
10	8	(Germany) Christian Vietoris	Racing Engineering	23	+32.077	1	
11	1	(Switzerland) Fabio Leimer	Rapax	23	+43.201	11	
12	17	(United Kingdom) Adam Carroll	Super Nova Racing	23	+49.030	19	
13	3	(France) Charles Pic	Barwa Addax Team	23	+59.579	7	
14	27	(Italy) Davide Valsecchi	Caterham Team AirAsia	23	+1:00.461	16	
15	25	(Russia) Mikhail Aleshin	Carlin	23	+1:03.372	15	
16	10	(Sweden) Marcus Ericsson	iSport International	23	+1:20.478^{3}	4	
17	14	(Czech Republic) Josef Král	Arden International	23	+1:21.280	9	
18	15	(United Kingdom) Jolyon Palmer	Arden International	21	Retired	22	
Ret	23	(Venezuela) Johnny Cecotto Jr.	Ocean Racing Technology	19	Retired	25	
Ret	7	(Spain) Dani Clos	Racing Engineering	16	Retired	10	
Ret	2	(Colombia) Julián Leal	Rapax	15	Retired	20	
Ret	12	(Norway) Pål Varhaug	DAMS	13	Retired	13	
Ret	19	(Italy) Luca Filippi	Scuderia Coloni	13	Retired	3	
Ret	16	(Malaysia) Fairuz Fauzy	Super Nova Racing	8	Retired	26	
Ret	24	(United Kingdom) Max Chilton	Carlin	7	Retired	18	
Ret	18	(Romania) Michael Herck	Scuderia Coloni	1	Retired	12	
Fastest lap: Romain Grosjean (DAMS) 1:47.730 (lap 13)

Notes

- ^3 – Ericsson was given a twenty-second penalty after the race.

== Standings after the round ==
Drivers' Championship standings

Pos	Driver	Points
1	(France) Romain Grosjean	74
2	(Netherlands) Giedo van der Garde	49
3	(France) Charles Pic	42
4	(France) Jules Bianchi	35
5	(United Kingdom) Sam Bird	35

Teams' Championship standings

Pos	Team	Points
1	(Spain) Barwa Addax Team	91
2	(France) DAMS	74
3	(United Kingdom) iSport International	60
4	(France) Lotus ART	49
5	(Malaysia) Caterham Team AirAsia	49

- Note: Only the top five positions are included for both sets of standings.

== See also ==
- 2011 Hungarian Grand Prix
- 2011 Hungaroring GP3 Series round

Previous round: 2011 German GP2 round	GP2 Series; 2011 season	Next round: 2011 Belgian GP2 round
Previous round: 2010 Hungarian GP2 round	Hungarian GP2 round	Next round: 2012 Hungaroring GP2 Series round
