= 2011 Silverstone GP2 Series round =

2011 GP2 race held in the United Kingdom

(United Kingdom) 2011 British GP2 round
Round details
- Round 5 of 9 rounds in the 2011 GP2 Series
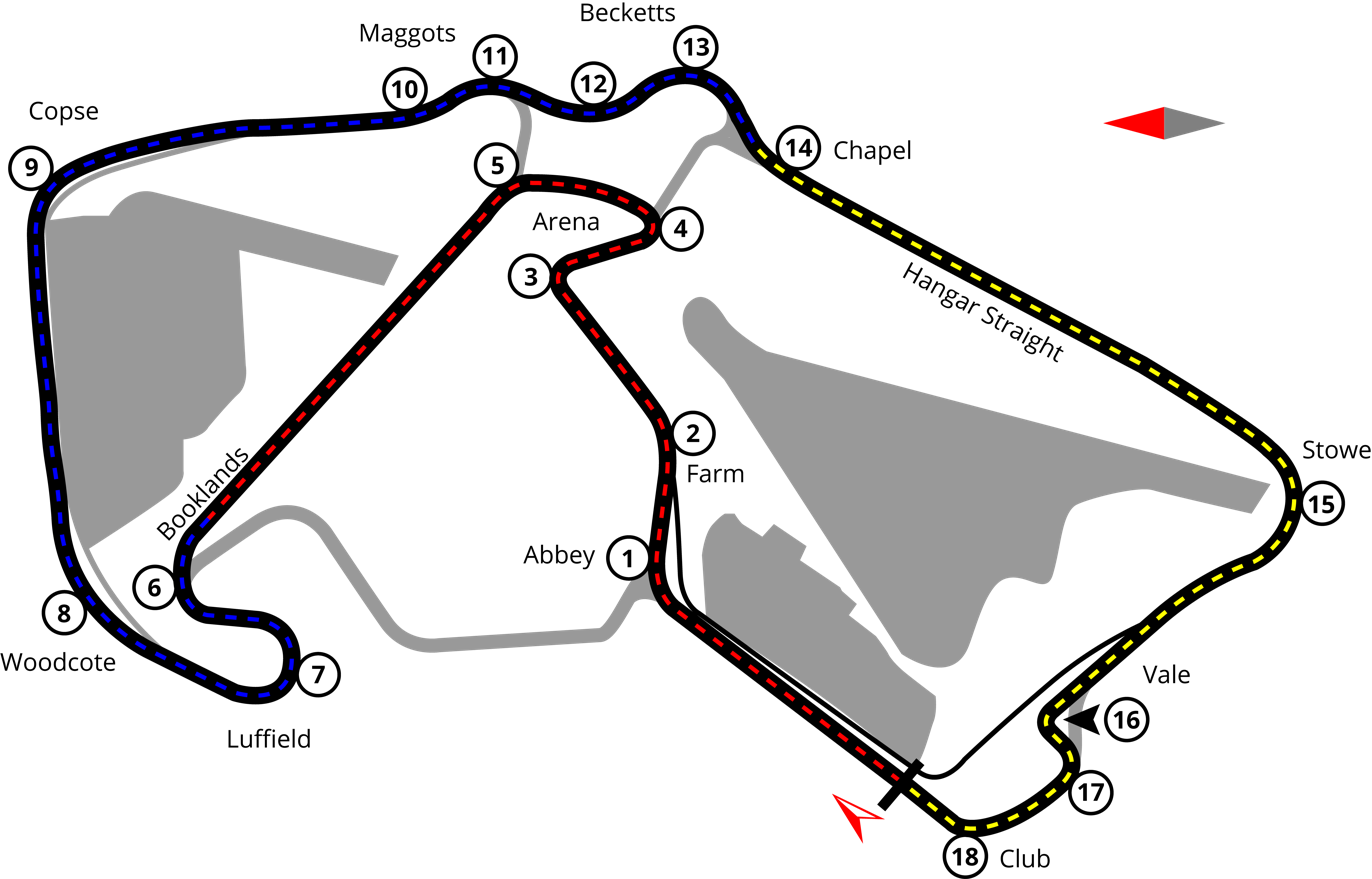
- Silverstone Circuit
- Location: Silverstone Circuit; Northamptonshire, England
- Course: Permanent racing facility 5.901 km (3.667 mi)

GP2 Series

Feature race
- Date: 9 July 2011
- Laps: 29

Pole position
Driver	(France) Jules Bianchi	Lotus ART
- Time: 1:58:531

Podium
First	(France) Jules Bianchi	Lotus ART
Second	(Germany) Christian Vietoris	Racing Engineering
Third	(Sweden) Marcus Ericsson	iSport International

Fastest lap
Driver	(France) Romain Grosjean	DAMS
- Time: 1:43.274 (on lap 27)

Sprint race
- Date: 10 July 2011
- Laps: 21

Podium
First	(France) Romain Grosjean	DAMS
Second	(Spain) Dani Clos	Racing Engineering
Third	(Netherlands) Giedo van der Garde	Barwa Addax Team

Fastest lap
Driver	(Monaco) Stefano Coletti	Trident Racing
- Time: 1:43:262 (on lap 12)

The 2011 British GP2 round was a GP2 Series motor race held on 9 and 10 July 2011 at Silverstone Circuit in Silverstone, United Kingdom. It was the fifth round of the 2011 GP2 Season. The race supported the 2011 British Grand Prix.

== Classification ==
=== Qualifying ===
Pos	No.	Driver	Team	Time	Grid
1	5	(France) Jules Bianchi	Lotus ART	1:58.531	1
2	25	(Portugal) Álvaro Parente	Carlin	1:58.971	2
3	11	(France) Romain Grosjean	DAMS	1:59.020	13^{1}
4	8	(Germany) Christian Vietoris	Racing Engineering	1:59.143	3
5	7	(Spain) Dani Clos	Racing Engineering	1:59.881	4
6	24	(United Kingdom) Max Chilton	Carlin	1:59.952	5
7	10	(Sweden) Marcus Ericsson	iSport International	2:00.044	6
8	6	(Mexico) Esteban Gutiérrez	Lotus ART	2:00.109	7
9	9	(United Kingdom) Sam Bird	iSport International	2:00.175	8
10	3	(France) Charles Pic	Barwa Addax Team	2:00.223	9
11	23	(Venezuela) Johnny Cecotto Jr.	Ocean Racing Technology	2:00.300	10
12	15	(United Kingdom) Jolyon Palmer	Arden International	2:00.462	11
13	27	(Italy) Davide Valsecchi	Caterham Team AirAsia	2:00.527	12
14	18	(Romania) Michael Herck	Scuderia Coloni	2:00.529	14
15	2	(Colombia) Julián Leal	Rapax	2:00.927	15
16	12	(Norway) Pål Varhaug	DAMS	2:01.203	16
17	17	(Italy) Luca Filippi	Super Nova Racing	2:01.315	17
18	19	(Italy) Kevin Ceccon	Scuderia Coloni	2:01.816	18
19	4	(Netherlands) Giedo van der Garde	Barwa Addax Team	2:02.681	19
20	26	(Brazil) Luiz Razia	Caterham Team AirAsia	2:01.922	20
21	21	(Monaco) Stefano Coletti	Trident Racing	2:02.681	21
22	14	(Czech Republic) Josef Král	Arden International	2:02.800	22
23	20	(Venezuela) Rodolfo González	Trident Racing	2:03.268	23
24	16	(Malaysia) Fairuz Fauzy	Super Nova Racing	2:04.518	24
25	1	(Switzerland) Fabio Leimer	Rapax	2:08.608	25
26	22	(Germany) Kevin Mirocha	Ocean Racing Technology	no time	DNS^{2}

Notes

1. – Grosjean was given a ten grid position penalty after Valencia Sprint Race for causing a collision.
2. – Mirocha did not take part in the qualifying session and did not continue the race weekend due to a pre-existing shoulder injury.

=== Feature Race ===
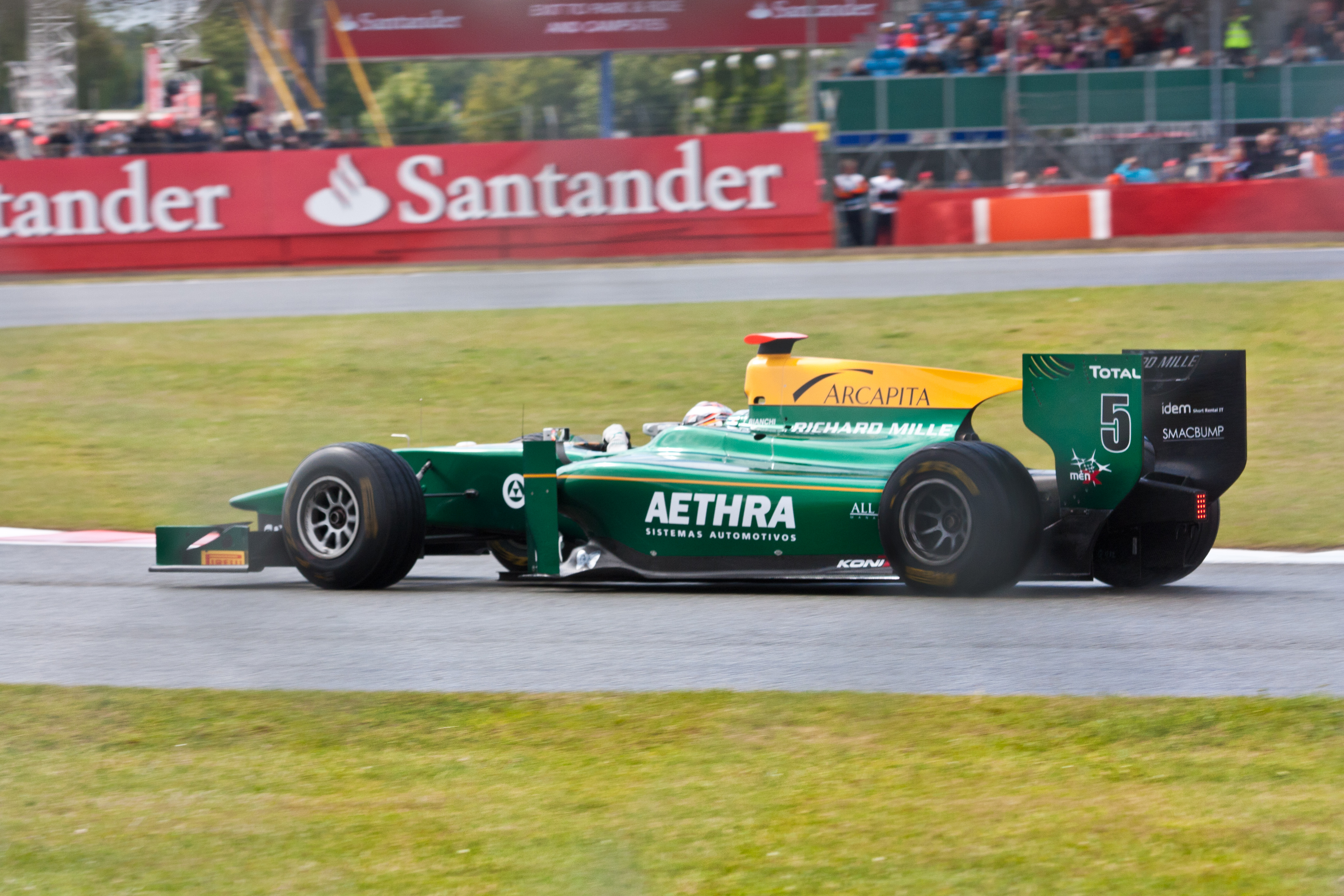
Jules Bianchi (Lotus ART) took pole position and won the feature race.

Pos	No.	Driver	Team	Laps	Time/Retired	Grid	Points
1	5	(France) Jules Bianchi	Lotus ART	29	58:40.010	1	10+2
2	8	(Germany) Christian Vietoris	Racing Engineering	29	+4.177	3	8
3	10	(Sweden) Marcus Ericsson	iSport International	29	+4.935	6	6
4	11	(France) Romain Grosjean	DAMS	29	+5.627	13	5+1
5	9	(United Kingdom) Sam Bird	iSport International	29	+11.424	8	4
6	7	(Spain) Dani Clos	Racing Engineering	29	+23.293	4	3
7	21	(Monaco) Stefano Coletti	Trident Racing	29	+31.959	21	2
8	4	(Netherlands) Giedo van der Garde	Barwa Addax Team	29	+33.711	19	1
9	25	(Portugal) Álvaro Parente	Carlin	29	+34.394	2	
10	6	(Mexico) Esteban Gutiérrez	Lotus ART	29	+41.761	7	
11	3	(France) Charles Pic	Barwa Addax Team	29	+41.971	9	
12	23	(Venezuela) Johnny Cecotto Jr.	Ocean Racing Technology	29	+46.881	10	
13	17	(Italy) Luca Filippi	Super Nova Racing	29	+47.848	17	
14	27	(Italy) Davide Valsecchi	Caterham Team AirAsia	29	+49.612	12	
15	1	(Switzerland) Fabio Leimer	Rapax	29	+50.717	25	
16	12	(Norway) Pål Varhaug	DAMS	29	+56.960	16	
17	26	(Brazil) Luiz Razia	Caterham Team AirAsia	29	+58.332	20	
18	20	(Venezuela) Rodolfo González	Trident Racing	29	+1:05.327	23	
19	19	(Italy) Kevin Ceccon	Scuderia Coloni	29	+1:06.251	18	
20	15	(United Kingdom) Jolyon Palmer	Arden International	29	+1:11.163^{3}	11	
21	16	(Malaysia) Fairuz Fauzy	Super Nova Racing	29	+1:20.989	24	
22	2	(Colombia) Julián Leal	Rapax	29	+1:26.252	15	
23	14	(Czech Republic) Josef Král	Arden International	29	+1:33.465	22	
24	18	(Romania) Michael Herck	Scuderia Coloni	28	+1 lap	14	
Ret	24	(United Kingdom) Max Chilton	Carlin	14	Collision	5	
DNS	22	(Germany) Kevin Mirocha	Ocean Racing Technology		Injury		
Fastest lap: Romain Grosjean (DAMS) 1:43.274 (lap 27)

Notes

1. – Palmer was given a 30 seconds time penalty, having forced Gutiérrez off the track.

=== Sprint Race ===
Pos	No.	Driver	Team	Laps	Time/Retired	Grid	Points
1	11	(France) Romain Grosjean	DAMS	21	36:42.650	5	6+1
2	7	(Spain) Dani Clos	Racing Engineering	21	+7.019	3	5
3	4	(Netherlands) Giedo van der Garde	Barwa Addax Team	21	+7.760	1	4
4	10	(Sweden) Marcus Ericsson	iSport International	21	+8.433	6	3
5	5	(France) Jules Bianchi	Lotus ART	21	+9.427	8	2
6	9	(United Kingdom) Sam Bird	iSport International	21	+12.924	4	1
7	8	(Germany) Christian Vietoris	Racing Engineering	21	+20.853	7	
8	6	(Mexico) Esteban Gutiérrez	Lotus ART	21	+21.888	10	
9	25	(Portugal) Álvaro Parente	Carlin	21	+22.128	9	
10	3	(France) Charles Pic	Barwa Addax Team	21	+23.154	11	
11	1	(Switzerland) Fabio Leimer	Rapax	21	+23.296	15	
12	17	(Italy) Luca Filippi	Super Nova Racing	21	+23.624	13	
13	20	(Venezuela) Rodolfo González	Trident Racing	21	+31.357	18	
14	26	(Brazil) Luiz Razia	Caterham Team AirAsia	21	+32.330	17	
15	16	(Malaysia) Fairuz Fauzy	Super Nova Racing	21	+32.780	21	
16	15	(United Kingdom) Jolyon Palmer	Arden International	21	+33.447	20	
17	27	(Italy) Davide Valsecchi	Caterham Team AirAsia	21	+34.778	14	
18	18	(Romania) Michael Herck	Scuderia Coloni	21	+38.139	24	
19	24	(United Kingdom) Max Chilton	Carlin	21	+39.168	25	
20	14	(Czech Republic) Josef Král	Arden International	21	+40.754	23	
21	2	(Colombia) Julián Leal	Rapax	21	+1:25.700	22	
22	21	(Monaco) Stefano Coletti	Trident Racing	20	+1 lap	2	
23	12	(Norway) Pål Varhaug	DAMS	20	+1 lap	16	
Ret	23	(Venezuela) Johnny Cecotto Jr.	Ocean Racing Technology	10	Gearbox	12	
Ret	19	(Italy) Kevin Ceccon	Scuderia Coloni	6	Suspension	19	
DNS	22	(Germany) Kevin Mirocha	Ocean Racing Technology		Injury		
Fastest lap: Stefano Coletti (Trident Racing) 1:43.262 (lap 12)

== Standings after the round ==
Drivers' Championship standings

Pos	Driver	Points
1	(France) Romain Grosjean	47
2	(Netherlands) Giedo van der Garde	38
3	(United Kingdom) Sam Bird	32
4	(Italy) Davide Valsecchi	30
5	(France) Charles Pic	24

Teams' Championship standings

Pos	Team	Points
1	(Spain) Barwa Addax Team	62
2	(United Kingdom) iSport International	49
3	(France) DAMS	47
4	(Malaysia) Caterham Team AirAsia	41
5	(Spain) Racing Engineering	40

- Note: Only the top five positions are included for both sets of standings.

== See also ==
- 2011 British Grand Prix
- 2011 Silverstone GP3 Series round

Previous round: 2011 Valencian GP2 round	GP2 Series; 2011 season	Next round: 2011 German GP2 round
Previous round: 2010 British GP2 round	British GP2 round	Next round: 2012 Silverstone GP2 Series round
