= 2011 Nürburgring GP2 Series round =

Open wheel motor race

(Germany) 2011 German GP2 round
Round details
- Round 6 of 9 rounds in the 2011 GP2 Series
- Location: Nürburgring, Nürburg, Germany
- Course: Permanent racing facility 5.148 km (3.199 mi)

GP2 Series

Feature race
- Date: 23 July 2011
- Laps: 34

Pole position
Driver	(France) Charles Pic	Barwa Addax Team
- Time: 1:40.317

Podium
First	(Italy) Luca Filippi	Scuderia Coloni
Second	(France) Charles Pic	Barwa Addax Team
Third	(France) Romain Grosjean	DAMS

Fastest lap
Driver	(Italy) Luca Filippi	Scuderia Coloni
- Time: 1:42.696 (on lap 23)

Sprint race
- Date: 24 July 2011
- Laps: 23 (24 scheduled)

Podium
First	(France) Romain Grosjean	DAMS
Second	(France) Jules Bianchi	Lotus ART
Third	(Italy) Luca Filippi	Scuderia Coloni

Fastest lap
Driver	(Germany) Christian Vietoris	Racing Engineering
- Time: 1:46.494 (on lap 23)

The 2011 German GP2 round was a GP2 Series motor race held on July 23 and 24, 2011 at Nürburgring, Germany. It is the sixth round of the 2011 GP2 season. The race supported the 2011 German Grand Prix.

== Classification ==
=== Qualifying ===
Pos	No.	Driver	Team	Time	Grid
1	3	(France) Charles Pic	Barwa Addax Team	1:40.317	1
2	19	(Italy) Luca Filippi	Scuderia Coloni	1:40.393	2
3	11	(France) Romain Grosjean	DAMS	1:40.431	3
4	5	(France) Jules Bianchi	Lotus ART	1:40.755	4
5	4	(Netherlands) Giedo van der Garde	Barwa Addax Team	1:40.781	5
6	1	(Switzerland) Fabio Leimer	Rapax	1:40.794	6
7	25	(Portugal) Álvaro Parente	Carlin	1:40.803	7
8	6	(Mexico) Esteban Gutiérrez	Lotus ART	1:40.817	8
9	10	(Sweden) Marcus Ericsson	iSport International	1:40.859	9
10	26	(Brazil) Luiz Razia	Caterham Team AirAsia	1:40.968	10
11	9	(United Kingdom) Sam Bird	iSport International	1:40.970	11
12	7	(Spain) Dani Clos	Racing Engineering	1:40.998	12
13	18	(Romania) Michael Herck	Scuderia Coloni	1:41.059	16^{1}
14	8	(Germany) Christian Vietoris	Racing Engineering	1:41.101	13
15	17	(United Kingdom) Adam Carroll	Super Nova Racing	1:41.141	14
16	21	(Monaco) Stefano Coletti	Trident Racing	1.41.166	15
17	22	(Germany) Kevin Mirocha	Ocean Racing Technology	1:41.268	17
18	27	(Italy) Davide Valsecchi	Caterham Team AirAsia	1:41.354	18
19	14	(Czech Republic) Josef Král	Arden International	1:41.356	19
20	20	(Venezuela) Rodolfo González	Trident Racing	1:41.489	20
21	23	(Venezuela) Johnny Cecotto Jr.	Ocean Racing Technology	1:41.489	21
22	15	(United Kingdom) Jolyon Palmer	Arden International	1:41.594	22
23	12	(Norway) Pål Varhaug	DAMS	1:41.633	23
24	2	(Colombia) Julián Leal	Rapax	1:41.894	24
25	16	(Malaysia) Fairuz Fauzy	Super Nova Racing	1:41.966	25
26	24	(United Kingdom) Max Chilton	Carlin	1:42.783	26

Notes

- ^1 – Herck was given a three place grid penalty for Feature Race after impeding Bird in the qualifying session.

=== Feature Race ===
Pos	No.	Driver	Team	Laps	Time/Retired	Grid	Points
1	19	(Italy) Luca Filippi	Scuderia Coloni	34	1:01:06.975	2	10+1
2	3	(France) Charles Pic	Barwa Addax Team	34	+5.558	1	8+2
3	11	(France) Romain Grosjean	DAMS	34	+6.877	3	6
4	5	(France) Jules Bianchi	Lotus ART	34	+33.491	4	5
5	10	(Sweden) Marcus Ericsson	iSport International	34	+37.716	9	4
6	4	(Netherlands) Giedo van der Garde	Barwa Addax Team	34	+41.146	5	3
7	7	(Spain) Dani Clos	Racing Engineering	34	+45.977	12	2
8	9	(United Kingdom) Sam Bird	iSport International	34	+46.461	11	1
9	20	(Venezuela) Rodolfo González	Trident Racing	34	+48.452	20	
10	23	(Venezuela) Johnny Cecotto Jr.	Ocean Racing Technology	34	+1:12.166	21	
11	18	(Romania) Michael Herck	Scuderia Coloni	34	+1:12.581	16	
12	6	(Mexico) Esteban Gutiérrez	Lotus ART	34	+1:13.285	8	
13	27	(Italy) Davide Valsecchi	Caterham Team AirAsia	34	+1:13.447	18	
14	2	(Colombia) Julián Leal	Rapax	34	+1:20.824	24	
15	17	(United Kingdom) Adam Carroll	Super Nova Racing	34	+1:23.404	14	
16	16	(Malaysia) Fairuz Fauzy	Super Nova Racing	34	+1:25.492	25	
17	24	(United Kingdom) Max Chilton	Carlin	34	+1:26.566	26	
18	14	(Czech Republic) Josef Král	Arden International	34	+1:31.615	19	
19	15	(United Kingdom) Jolyon Palmer	Arden International	33	+1 lap	22	
20	25	(Portugal) Álvaro Parente	Carlin	32	Retirement	7	
DSQ	1	(Switzerland) Fabio Leimer	Rapax	34	(+47.075)^{2}	6	
Ret	26	(Brazil) Luiz Razia	Caterham Team AirAsia	29	Collision	10	
Ret	21	(Monaco) Stefano Coletti	Trident Racing	28	Retirement	15	
Ret	8	(Germany) Christian Vietoris	Racing Engineering	1	Collision	13	
Ret	22	(Germany) Kevin Mirocha	Ocean Racing Technology	0	Collision	17	
Ret	12	(Norway) Pål Varhaug	DAMS	0	Collision	23	
Fastest lap: Luca Filippi (Scuderia Coloni) 1:42.696 (lap 23)

Notes

- ^2 – Leimer was excluded from Feature Race classification for causing collisions.

=== Sprint Race ===
Pos	No.	Driver	Team	Laps	Time/Retired	Grid	Points
1	11	(France) Romain Grosjean	DAMS	23	45:09.296	6	6
2	5	(France) Jules Bianchi	Lotus ART	23	+1.569	5	5
3	19	(Italy) Luca Filippi	Scuderia Coloni	23	+7.768	8	4
4	8	(Germany) Christian Vietoris	Racing Engineering	23	+14.388	23	3+1
5	17	(United Kingdom) Adam Carroll	Super Nova Racing	23	+24.962	15	2
6	24	(United Kingdom) Max Chilton	Carlin	23	+42.102	17	1
7	9	(United Kingdom) Sam Bird	iSport International	23	+42.428	1	
8	1	(Switzerland) Fabio Leimer	Rapax	23	+45.561	26^{3}	
9	2	(Colombia) Julián Leal	Rapax	23	+59.610	14	
10	18	(Romania) Michael Herck	Scuderia Coloni	23	+1:04.044	11	
11	14	(Czech Republic) Josef Král	Arden International	23	+1:05.990	18	
12	16	(Malaysia) Fairuz Fauzy	Super Nova Racing	23	+1:06.370	16	
13	22	(Germany) Kevin Mirocha	Ocean Racing Technology	23	+1:07.101	24	
14	26	(Brazil) Luiz Razia	Caterham Team AirAsia	23	+1:07.957	21	
15	20	(Venezuela) Rodolfo González	Trident Racing	23	+1:15.328	9	
16	10	(Sweden) Marcus Ericsson	iSport International	22	Spun off	4	
17	12	(Norway) Pål Varhaug	DAMS	22	+1 lap	25^{4}	
DSQ	3	(France) Charles Pic	Barwa Addax Team	20	Late drive through	7	
Ret	27	(Italy) Davide Valsecchi	Caterham Team AirAsia	17	Collision	13	
Ret	15	(United Kingdom) Jolyon Palmer	Arden International	17	Collision	19	
Ret	6	(Mexico) Esteban Gutiérrez	Lotus ART	15	Wheel	12	
Ret	25	(Portugal) Álvaro Parente	Carlin	10	Spun off	20	
Ret	23	(Venezuela) Johnny Cecotto Jr.	Ocean Racing Technology	6	Collision	10	
Ret	21	(Monaco) Stefano Coletti	Trident Racing	6	Spun off	22	
Ret	4	(Netherlands) Giedo van der Garde	Barwa Addax Team	1	Collision damage	3	
Ret	7	(Spain) Dani Clos	Racing Engineering	0	Collision	2	
Fastest lap: Christian Vietoris (Racing Engineering) 1:46.494 (lap 23)

Notes

- ^3 – Leimer, excluded from Race 1, started Sprint Race last on the grid.
- ^4 – Varhaug was given a ten grid place penalty for causing a collision during Feature Race.

== Standings after the round ==
Drivers' Championship standings

Pos	Driver	Points
1	(France) Romain Grosjean	59
2	(Netherlands) Giedo van der Garde	41
3	(France) Charles Pic	34
4	(United Kingdom) Sam Bird	33
5	(France) Jules Bianchi	32

Teams' Championship standings

Pos	Team	Points
1	(Spain) Barwa Addax Team	75
2	(France) DAMS	59
3	(United Kingdom) iSport International	54
4	(Spain) Racing Engineering	46
5	(Malaysia) Caterham Team AirAsia	41

- Note: Only the top five positions are included for both sets of standings.

== See also ==
- 2011 German Grand Prix
- 2011 Nürburgring GP3 Series round

Previous round: 2011 British GP2 round	GP2 Series; 2011 season	Next round: 2011 Hungarian GP2 round
Previous round: 2009 Nürburgring GP2 Series round	Nürburgring GP2 round	Next round: 2013 Nürburgring GP2 Series round
