= 2018 Mexico City ePrix =

Race 5 of 12 of the 2017–18 Formula E Championship
← Previous race	Next race →
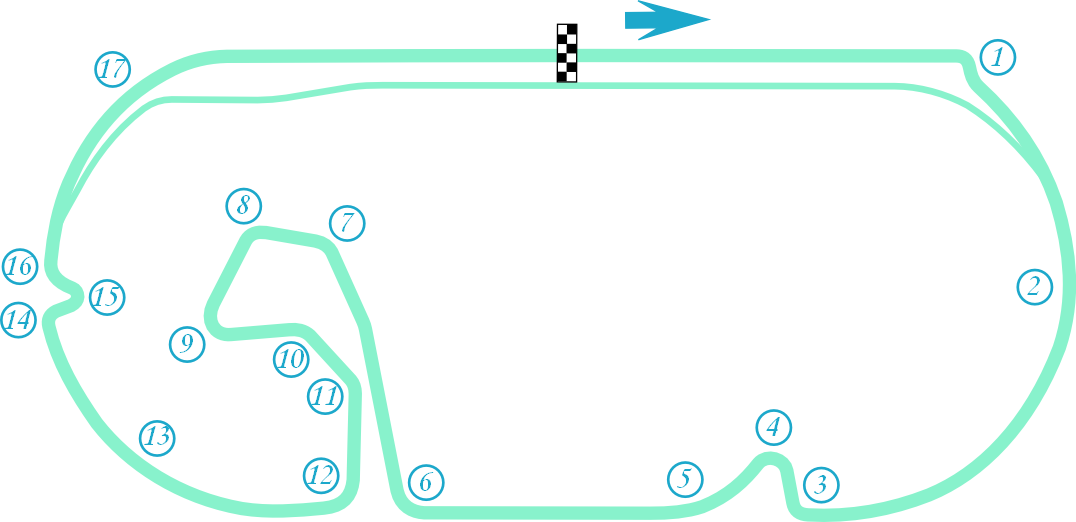

Race details
- Date: 3 March 2018
- Official name: 2018 ABB Formula E Mexico City e-Prix
- Location: Autódromo Hermanos Rodríguez, Mexico City
- Course: Permanent racing facility
- Course length: 2.093 km (1.301 mi)
- Distance: 47 laps, 98.371 km (61.125 mi)
- Weather: Warm and sunny

Pole position
Driver	(Sweden) Felix Rosenqvist	Mahindra
- Time: 1:01.645

Fastest lap
Driver	(Brazil) Lucas di Grassi	Audi
- Time: 1:02.202 on lap 27

Podium
First	(Germany) Daniel Abt	Audi
Second	(United Kingdom) Oliver Turvey	NIO
Third	(Switzerland) Sébastien Buemi	e.Dams-Renault

The 2018 Mexico City ePrix (formally the 2018 ABB Formula E Mexico City e-Prix) was a Formula E electric car race held at the Autódromo Hermanos Rodríguez in the centre of Mexico City on 3 March 2018. It was the fifth round of the 2017–18 Formula E Championship and the third edition of the event as part of the championship. Audi driver Daniel Abt won the 47-lap race starting from fifth position. Oliver Turvey finished second for NIO in what would be his only Formula E podium, and e.Dams-Renault driver Sébastien Buemi took third.

Mahindra's Felix Rosenqvist won the pole position by posting the fastest lap in qualifying and led for the first 14 laps until a battery management system problem at the final corner promoted Turvey to the lead. Turvey held the lead until the mandatory pit stops to change into a second car. Swift work from Abt's pit crew moved him past Turvey who was slow leaving his garage because of a gear selection fault. Abt led the rest of the race to take his first career victory and the first for a German in Formula E. Turvey took second after holding off Buemi in the final five laps.

The result increased Jean-Éric Vergne's lead in the Drivers' Championship to 12 points over Rosenqvist who retired because his car not have enough electrical energy to allow him to finish the race. Sam Bird kept third despite not scoring any points as Buemi maintained fourth and Nelson Piquet Jr. kept fifth. In the Teams' Championship, Techeetah further extended their advantage over the non-scoring Mahindra and Jaguar passed Virgin for third with seven races left in the season.

== Background ==
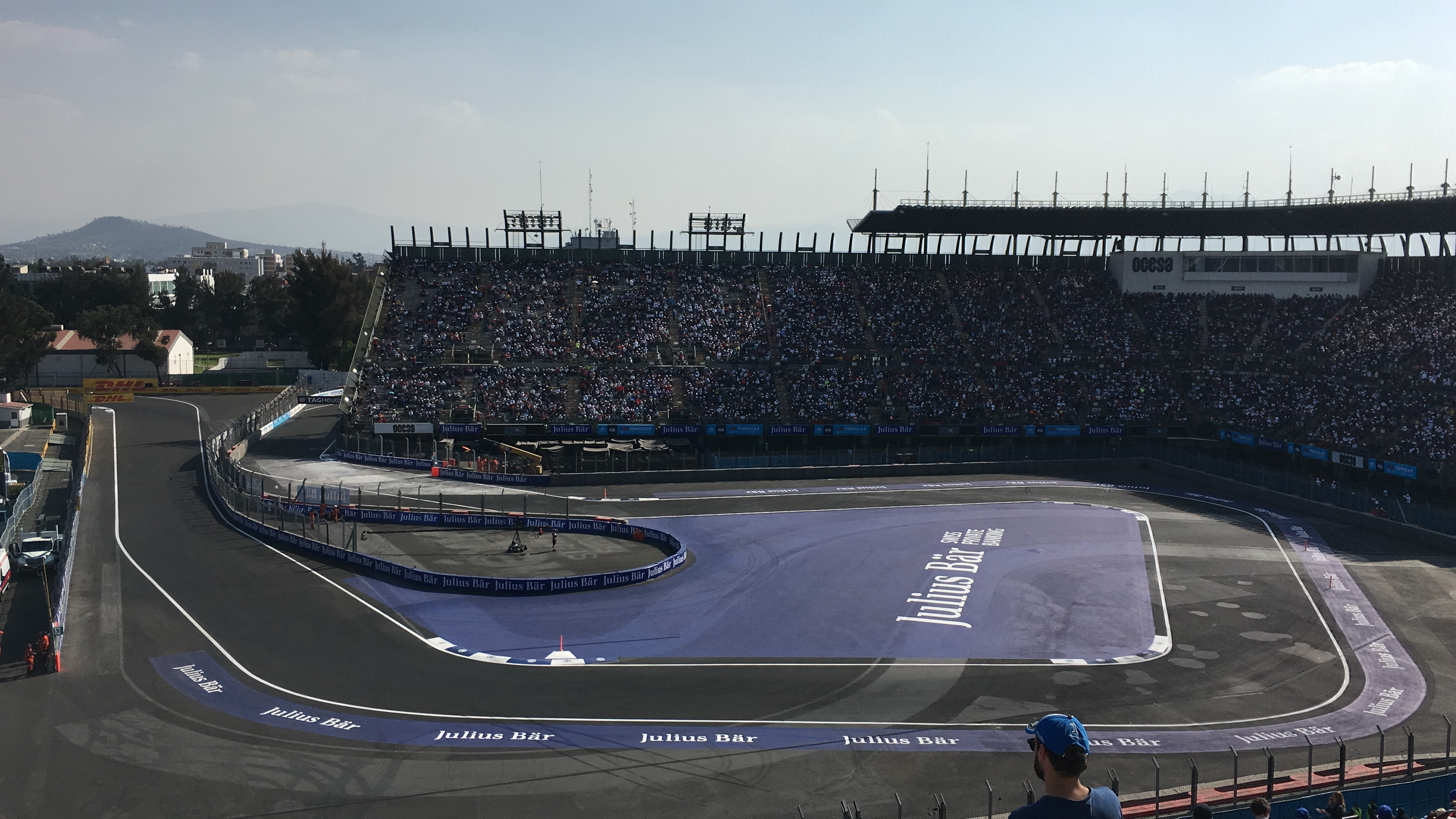
The Foro Sol Norte section of the Autódromo Hermanos Rodríguez, where the race was held.

The 2018 Mexico City ePrix was confirmed as part of Formula E's 2017–18 series schedule in September 2017 by the FIA World Motor Sport Council. It was the fifth of the twelve scheduled single-seater electric car races of the 2017–18 Championship, and the third time it was a FIA Formula E Championship event. It was held on 3 March 2018 at the Autódromo Hermanos Rodríguez in the centre of Mexico City. The race was the only one of the season held on a permanent track: it is a mixture of the Grand Prix and oval layouts and has 17 turns at a length of 2.093 km (1.301 mi). The high elevation of the circuit created thin air and lower wind resistance, causing teams to optimise the cooling of their cars; the asphalt surface was less abrasive than other tracks. The Fédération Internationale de l'Automobile (FIA; Formula E's governing body) introduced a track limits zone into turn one to stop drivers using the grass in that area. The driver adviser to the stewards for the race was former Deutsche Tourenwagen Masters racer Alexandre Prémat.

After winning the Santiago ePrix three weeks earlier, Techeetah driver Jean-Éric Vergne led the Drivers' Championship with 71 points and was five points ahead of Felix Rosenqvist of Mahindra. Sam Bird (Virgin) followed in third place with 61 points; Sébastien Buemi (e.Dams-Renault) was fourth and Nelson Piquet Jr (Jaguar) followed in fifth. Techeetah led the Teams' Championship with 89 points; Mahindra (87 points) followed close behind in second position and Virgin placed third with 69 points. Jaguar were fourth with 54 points and e.Dams-Renault were fifth with 44 points. A total of ten teams fielded two drivers each for a total of 20 participants in the event.

Allan McNish, team principal of Audi, affirmed his team would fight back after poor car reliability in the first four races and noted the unpredictability commonly observed in Formula E, "At the moment, we're going through a tough time in our young Formula E history. But we are as determined as ever and will continue to push to the maximum with Daniel [Abt] and Lucas, in spite of the current challenges." Buemi sought to continue his recent form of strong performances in Mexico and said his team would attack by using the experience they had accumulated in the previous two races in Mexico City, "I'm delighted to be back in Mexico after my performances in the last two races, and I hope that we'll keep up the momentum. We've always been quick in free practice in Mexico, but it's not been the same story in qualifying. We're determined to put that right this year and challenge for the race win."

After Techeetah and Dragon incurred record fines of €15,000 ($18,500) for seat belt manipulation in the preceding Santiago ePrix, the FIA issued a bulletin to all teams the day before the Mexico City race clarifying what was prohibited with the safety device. Starting from this race, the FIA forbade the installation of tie-wraps or teams using tape on the belts in line with a regulation prohibiting any material modification or safety harness reshaping. Also, the FIA undertook more detailed post-race examinations to prevent any future occurrence of teams using such systems. Andretti team principal Roger Griffiths explained, "The FIA has also clarified how, that if you are going to attach and relocate the driver's radio connector to the seatbelt, you can attach it only to the label on the seatbelt and not through the webbing of the material itself."

== Practice ==
Two practice sessions—both on Saturday morning—were held before the late afternoon race. The first session ran for 45 minutes and the second lasted half an hour. A half an hour untimed shakedown session was held on Friday afternoon to allow teams to check the reliability of their cars and their electronic systems. After shakedown, Venturi, Dragon, e.Dams-Renault and Jaguar were fined €5,000 for 5G electromagnetic radiation interference in the illegal 5–6 GHz band that could have potentially interfered with the FIA's data gathering system; a further €3,500 was suspended for the rest of the season. All four teams were cautioned a repeat occurrence put them at risk of disqualification. (Note: The stewards also investigated Andretti for the same transgression but the team were not penalised after presenting the FIA with a letter from 2016 that authorised them to operate in the frequency due to it being the sole feasible option at the time.)

The first practice session began under a rising sun in low air and track temperatures; no heat management concerns were reported. Additionally, the track surface was dusty and damp in some areas; some times were faster than Oliver Turvey's (NIO) 2017 pole position lap. Audi's Lucas di Grassi used 200 kW (270 hp) of power to record the fastest lap late on at 1 minute, 1.58 seconds, 0.362 seconds faster than any one else on the circuit. The rest of the top ten composed of Edoardo Mortara, Vergne, Mitch Evans, Alex Lynn, José María López, Rosenqvist, Daniel Abt, Bird and Buemi. No major incidents occurred during practice; several drivers ran onto the circuit's run-off areas. López was aggrieved at Luca Filippi who slowed him in turn three. He lost control of the rear of his vehicle at turn seven and avoided damaging it.

Di Grassi was again fastest in second practice with a 1-minute, 1.203 seconds lap. The session's early pace setter Rosenqvist was second and Evans placed third. Positions four to ten were occupied by Nick Heidfeld, Lynn, António Félix da Costa, Abt, Buemi, López and Bird. Mortara necessitated course officials to wave the full course yellow flags leaving the first corner as his car stopped in the turn two braking zone. Later, López lost control of the rear of his car and hit the turn 11 barrier with his left-rear wheel. López switched into his second car for the rest of the session. In the session's closing minutes, Heidfeld lost control of his car's rear at the turn seven and eight double left hander and struck the bollards dictating track limits. With five minutes left, Lynn was at maximum power driving tinto turn two and was about to pass the slower Rosenqvist on some dirt when he lost control of his vehicle's rear and struck a wall with the left-hand side after locking his brakes. Lynn was unhurt and the session continued with two minutes to go; no driver went faster.

== Qualifying ==
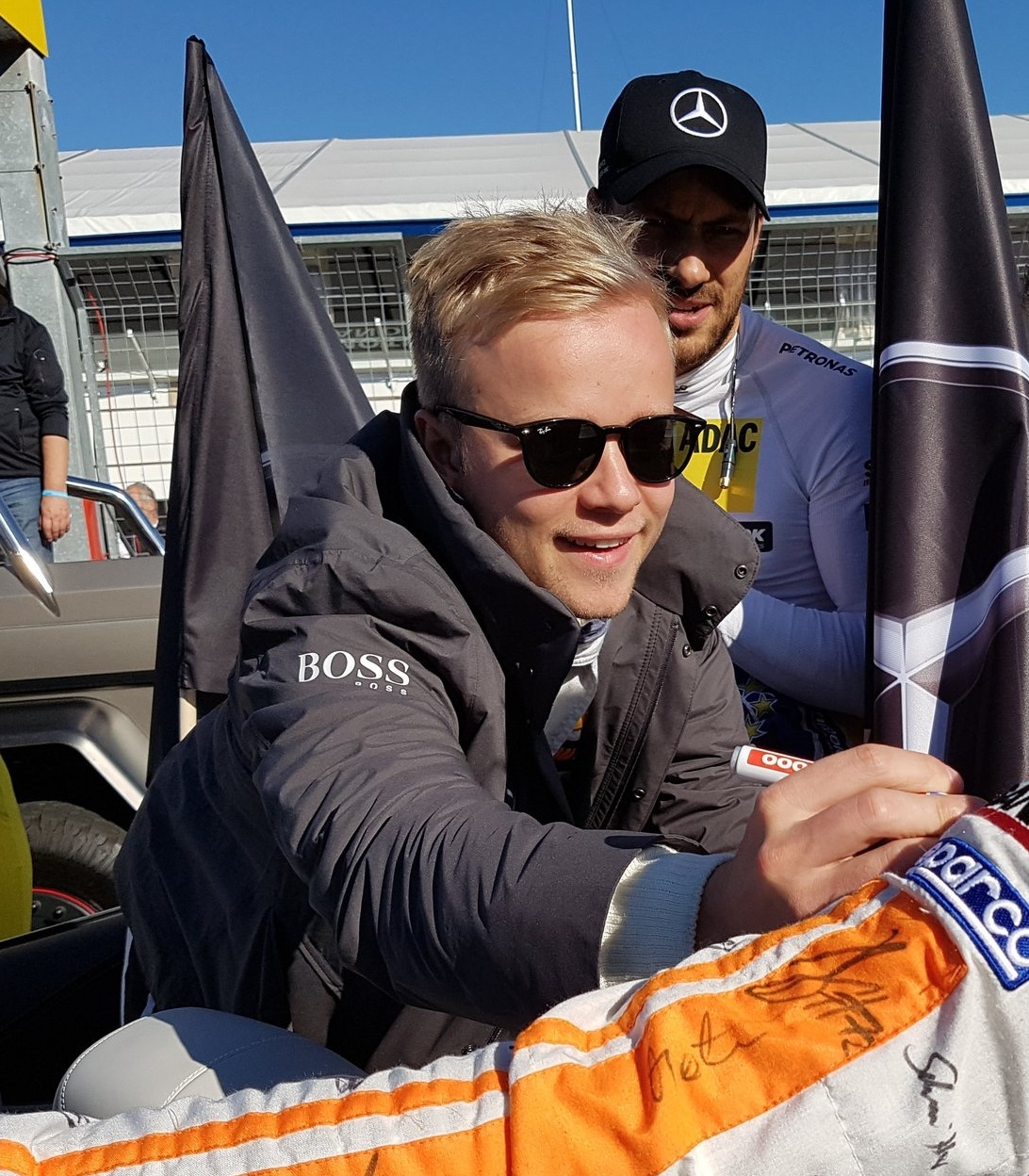
Felix Rosenqvist (pictured in 2016) took his second pole position of the season and the fifth of his career.

Saturday's afternoon qualifying session ran for an hour and was divided into four groups of five cars. Each group was placed in championship order and were determined by a lottery system and was permitted six minutes of on-track activity. Every driver was limited to two timed laps with one at maximum power. The fastest five overall competitors in the four groups participated in a "Super Pole" session with one driver on the track at any time going out in reverse order from fifth to first. Each of the five drivers was limited to one timed lap and the starting order was determined by the competitor's fastest times (Super Pole from first to fifth, and group qualifying from sixth to twentieth). The driver and team who recorded the fastest time were awarded three points towards their respective championships. In the first group of five runners, which was held on a dusty track that provided a negligible amount of grip, di Grassi was the early pace setter, followed by Maro Engel, Jérôme d'Ambrosio, Tom Blomqvist (who made a driving error) and Filippi. Buemi set the fastest overall group lap in the second group at 1 minute, 1.668 seconds. Rosenqvist was first to venture onto the track in the group and was fastest until Buemi's lap. Vergne lost time leaving the track's corners and was third. Piquet placed fourth. A suspension issue made Bird group two's slowest driver. In the third group, Félix da Costa set the fastest lap, ahead of Turvey. Lynn drove aggressively through the chicane to go third-fastest. López and Nico Prost rounded out the top five.

The track was at its most clean in the fourth group and saw Abt go fastest in the group by pushing hard. Heidfeld in second locked his tyres and did not set a clean lap time. Similarly, André Lotterer locked his tyres into the first corner and set the third-fastest lap. Fourth-placed Evans made an error in the first third of the lap and lost half a second in the next third due to his car cutting out. Mortara was slow throughout and placed 20th overall. At the end of group qualifying, Buemi, Rosenqvist, Félix da Costa, Turvey, Lynn's laps progressed them to super pole. Rosenqvist locked his tyres on his lap. Nonetheless, he took his second pole position of the season and the fifth of his career with a time of 1 minute, 1.645 seconds. He was provisionally joined on the grid's front row by Félix da Costa, in his first super pole appearance since the 2016 Long Beach ePrix, who locked his tyres at certain parts of the track and had pole position until Rosenqvist's lap. Lynn was third-fastest and his compatriot fourth-placed Turvey locked his tyres entering the second turn. Buemi locked his brakes driving into turn one; he was able to hit the apex of the corner at the start of his lap. A steady pace for the rest of Buemi's lap qualified him fifth. After qualifying, di Grassi and the Virgin duo of Bird and Lynn were demoted ten places for changing the inverter and gearbox in their respective cars. Similarly, Félix da Costa's car was discovered to be under the minimum weight limit of 880 kg (1,940 lb) during scrutineering. He started fourth since its weight after group qualifying complied with the regulations. The rest of the grid lined up after penalties as Abt, Vergne, Piquet, Heidfeld, Lotterer, Lynn, Engel, Evans, López, d'Ambrosio, Prost, Blomqvist, Filippi, Mortara, Bird and di Grassi.

=== Qualifying classification ===
Final qualifying classification
Pos.	No.	Driver	Team	GS	SP	Grid
1	19	(Sweden) Felix Rosenqvist	Mahindra	1:01.676	1:01.645	1
2	36	(United Kingdom) Alex Lynn	Virgin-Citroën	1:01.830	1:02.014	10^{2}
3	16	(United Kingdom) Oliver Turvey	NIO	1:01.777	1:02.172	2
4	9	(Switzerland) Sébastien Buemi	e.Dams-Renault	1:01.668	1:02.510	3
5	28	(Portugal) António Félix da Costa	Andretti-BMW	1:01.772	—	4^{1}
6	66	(Germany) Daniel Abt	Audi	1.01:885	—N/a	5
7	25	(France) Jean-Éric Vergne	Techeetah-Renault	1:01.962	—N/a	6
8	3	(Brazil) Nelson Piquet Jr.	Jaguar	1:01.964	—N/a	7
9	2	(United Kingdom) Sam Bird	Virgin-Citroën	1:02.007	—N/a	19^{2}
10	23	(Germany) Nick Heidfeld	Mahindra	1:02.023	—N/a	8
11	18	(Germany) André Lotterer	Techeetah-Renault	1:02.057	—N/a	9
12	1	(Brazil) Lucas di Grassi	Audi	1:02.079	—N/a	20^{3}
13	5	(Germany) Maro Engel	Venturi	1:02.091	—N/a	11
14	20	(New Zealand) Mitch Evans	Jaguar	1:02.135	—N/a	12
15	6	(Argentina) José María López	Dragon-Penske	1:02.264	—N/a	13
16	7	(Belgium) Jérôme d'Ambrosio	Dragon-Penske	1:02.360	—N/a	14
17	8	(France) Nico Prost	e.Dams-Renault	1:02.377	—N/a	15
18	27	(United Kingdom) Tom Blomqvist	Andretti-BMW	1:02.443	—N/a	16
19	68	(Italy) Luca Filippi	NIO	1:02.508	—N/a	17
20	4	(Switzerland) Edoardo Mortara	Venturi	1:03.416	—N/a	18

Notes:

- ^1— António Félix da Costa was demoted to fourth after his car was discovered to be under the minimum weight limit of 880 kg (1,940 lb).
- ^2— Alex Lynn and Sam Bird were penalised ten places for changing their gearboxes.
- ^3— Lucas di Grassi was demoted ten places for changing his inverter.

== Race ==
Weather conditions at the start were dry, warm and sunny with the air temperature was between 27.0 to 27.7 °C (80.6 to 81.9 °F) and the track temperature from 40.5 and 41.65 °C (104.90 and 106.97 °F). A special feature of Formula E is the "Fan Boost" feature, an additional 100 kilowatts (130 hp) of power to use in the driver's second car. The three drivers who were allowed to use the boost were determined by a fan vote. The distance of the racewas increased from 45 laps to 47 to better showcase the technological efficiency advancements teams had made. When the race began from its standing start at 16:00 Central Daylight Time (UTC–06:00), Rosenqvist maintained his pole position advantage heading into the first corner closely followed by Turvey and Buemi as the field avoided contact entering the turn. Abt made a fast getaway and moved past Félix da Costa for fourth while his fellow countryman Engel made a poor start and fell to 19th. A few cars in the middle of the pack collided with each other in turn three, launching chunks of bodywork airborne; no driver entered the pit lane for repairs. Then, López collided with his teammate d'Ambrosio; both continued with minor damage to their vehicles.

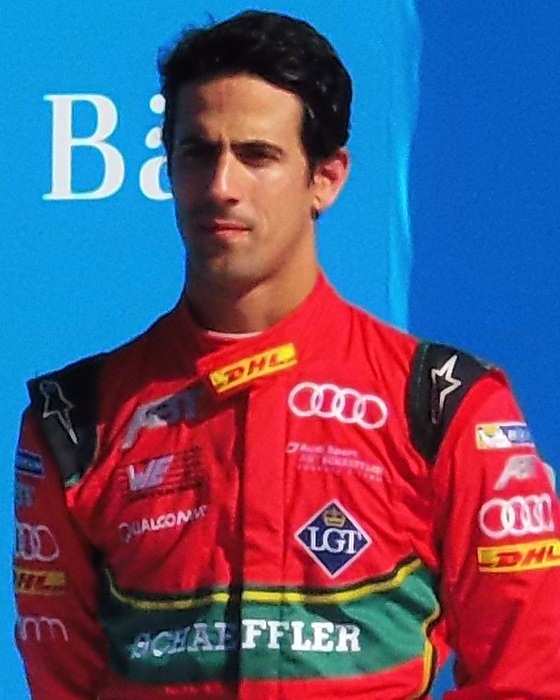
Lucas di Grassi (pictured in 2017) gained the most positions of anyone and took his first points of the season in ninth.

Di Grassi moved from 20th to 18th by the end of lap one while Evans gained three positions over the same distance. At the lap's conclusion, Rosenqvist led Turvey by eight-tenths of a second with Buemi third. Henceforth, Rosenqvist began to establish a small advantage over the rest of the field as drivers began to settle into a rhythm. Evans overtook Lotterer for eighth position on lap three, and Félix da Costa lost seventh two laps later to Vergne who passed Félix da Costa by putting him off the circuit at the entrance to turn six. Piquet used this to gain sixth. Di Grassi progressed through the field on the lap, passing Filippi into the first turn, a move that put the latter ran wide. This allowed Mortara to draw alongside Filippi on the inside. As the duo braked for the turn three chicane, both ran wide. Filippi drove across the chicane and stopped before rejoining the circuit. Mortara meanwhile drove across the kerbs to stay on the track. These events demoted Filippi behind Engel and Bird. Further ahead, Abt pressured Buemi as he momentarily could not affect a pass as Vergne was close behind.

By the ninth lap, most drivers had about 65 per cent of electrical energy remaining which gave no perceptible advantage for anyone bar Rosenqvist who led Turvey by two seconds. Buemi, di Grassi and Rosenqvist were announced as the winners of the FanBoost vote the lap after. Meanwhile, Turvey led Buemi by two-seconds, which was in contrast to previous races where his car typically struggled to pull away because of poor electrical energy usage. At the front, Rosenqvist set what was at this point the fastest lap of the race at 1 minute, 3.601 seconds and it appeared he would win the race and reclaim the lead of the Drivers' Championship from Vergne. As Rosenqvist exited the final corner to finish the 14th lap, he had a sudden loss in power due to a battery management system failure and stopped to reset his car and allow him to continue driving. Turvey moved into the lead with Buemi and Abt second and third. Rosenqvist fell to ninth and was out of contention for the victory.

Abt's attempts at passing Buemi were disrupted when Rosenqvist stopped twice more on the turn three run-off area and prompted course officials to wave localised yellow flags. Nevertheless, Abt overtook Buemi for second on the inside at the exit of turn one after the latter braked early and ran wide. Abt began to close up to Turvey. Rosenqvist chose to end his stop-start approach and made an early switch into his second car with the objective of re-entering the top ten. The leaders made their mandatory pit stops to change into a second car on lap 24. Piquet and di Grassi remained on the circuit for one additional lap before making their own stops. After the pit stops, Abt gained the lead from Turvey because his stop was six seconds faster than the latter who had gear selection trouble. Buemi fell to fourth as Vergne took third. Abt pulled away as Turvey came under attack from Vergne. On lap 27, Heidfeld stopped on the start/finish straight before entering the pit lane per the instructions of his team for troubleshooting that revealed a water pump failure, curtailing his race.

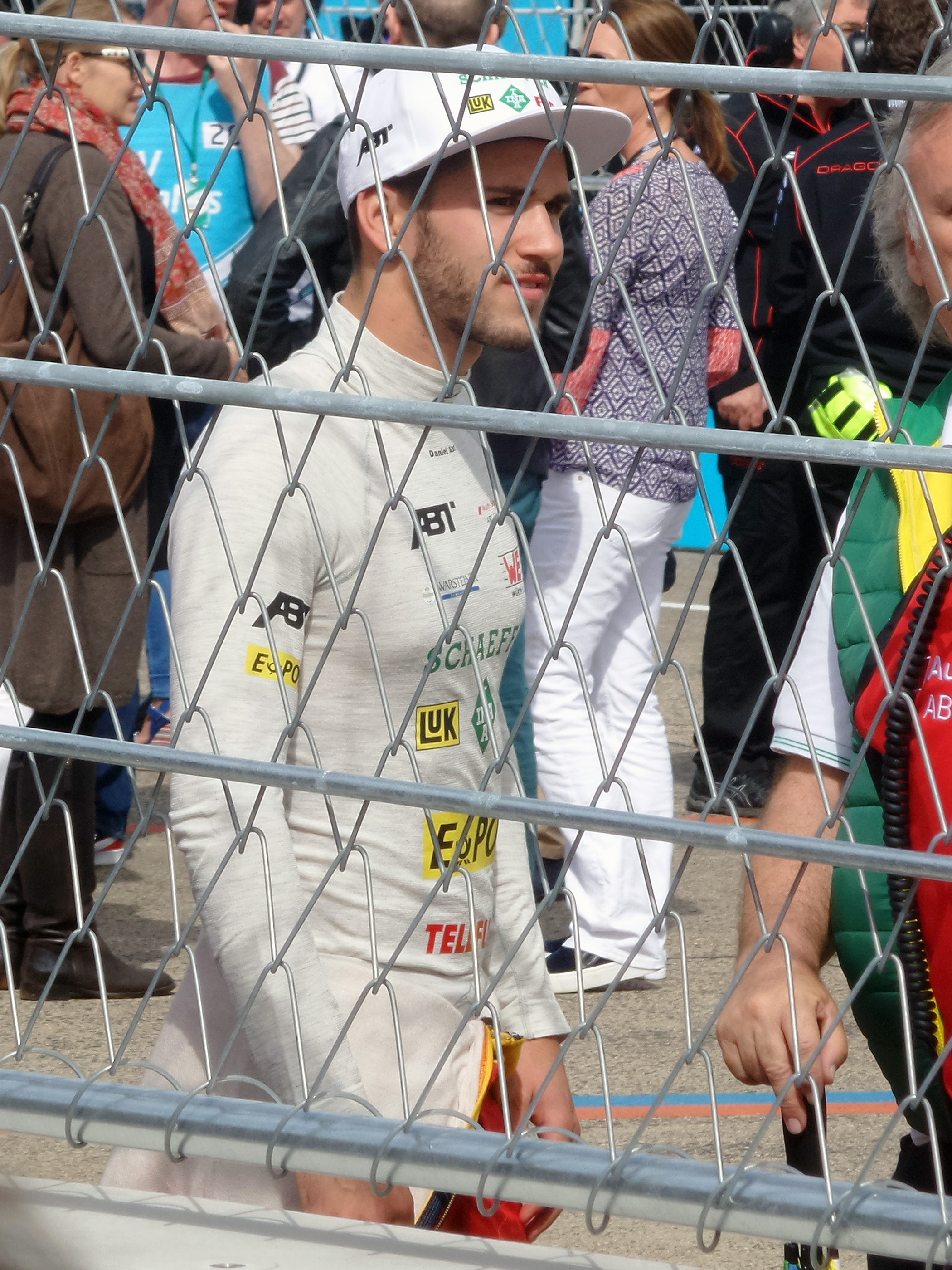
Daniel Abt (pictured in 2015) took the first win for a German driver in Formula E and Audi's first as a factory team.

As di Grassi was gaining positions, he earned one point for setting the fastest time on the lap, completing a circuit in 1 minute, 2.02 seconds. Further ahead, Turvey made a small error leaving the Peraltada chicane, allowing Vergne to unsuccessfully challenge him. This allowed Buemi to use FanBoost to pass Vergne by steering right onto the inside at the first corner on lap 28. Later, the stewards investigated Lotterer's pit stop release and penalised him with a drive-through penalty after determining he ran over the foot of a pit crew member leaving his garage, dropping him from seventh to thirteenth. The crew member was transported to the circuit's medical centre and released after examinations revealed no serious injures. Further down the pack on lap 31, di Grassi aimed for the top ten; a minor collision with López on the start/finish straight caused him to spin at the first turn.

Piquet had the knowledge of having more usable electrical energy and passed his teammate Evans two laps later. The following lap, Mahindra called the slow Rosenqvist into the pit lane to retire since he could not finish the race. Piquet overtook Vergne, whose two-way radio communication was cut off due to a systems glitch losing him all information on his steering wheel, for fourth place shortly after and started to hassle Buemi for third place. On lap 37, di Grassi used his FanBoost to pass d'Ambrosio for 12th while Prost parked his car in the garage with a broken front-right suspension due to contact with Bird at turn three, making him the race's final retiree. Turvey was slow leaving the Peraltada chicane, allowing Buemi to challenge him; he was mindful of the faster Piquet. Engel lost 11th to di Grassi in the race's final laps and broke his rear wing after contacting him.

At the start of the penultimate lap, Buemi attempted to pass Turvey for second and locked all four of his tyres. Buemi avoided striking the rear of Turvey's car. Turvey similarly locked his tyres as both drivers remained second and third; an earlier driving error from Piquet lost him a small amount of time. In his 37th start, Abt increased his lead to more than six seconds and took his first career victory. It was the first for a German driver in Formula E, and for Audi as a factory team. (Note: Abt previously won the second Hong Kong race but it was revoked for his team infringing technical regulations.) The victory moved Abt to sixth in the Drivers' Championship. Turvey finished second to earn his first career podium and Buemi was third. Off the podium, Piquet, Vergne, Evans, Félix da Costa, Mortara, di Grassi, Lynn, D'Ambrosio, López. Lotterer, Filippi, Blomqvist, Engel and Bird were the final finishers.

=== Post-race ===
The top three drivers appeared on the podium to collect their trophies and spoke to the media in a later press conference. Abt said going into the race, he and his team were aware his car was fast and their situation in the championship. He praised the swift work of his mechanics and noted Formula's E unpredictability, "We didn't give up, we kept believing in it and today was just a fantastic day." Turvey spoke of his delight over taking his and NIO's first podium, "Everyone in the team has worked so hard since last season to gain a huge step forward in performance and we've not been able to show this due to a few tough races." Third-place finisher Buemi said that winning the race would not have been possible because of the fast pace of Abt's car and was happy to accumulate extra championship points, "Today he [Abt] put his knowledge into practice and I had a problematic pit stop because I almost collided with Nico [Prost] because he had his pit stop at the same time as I."

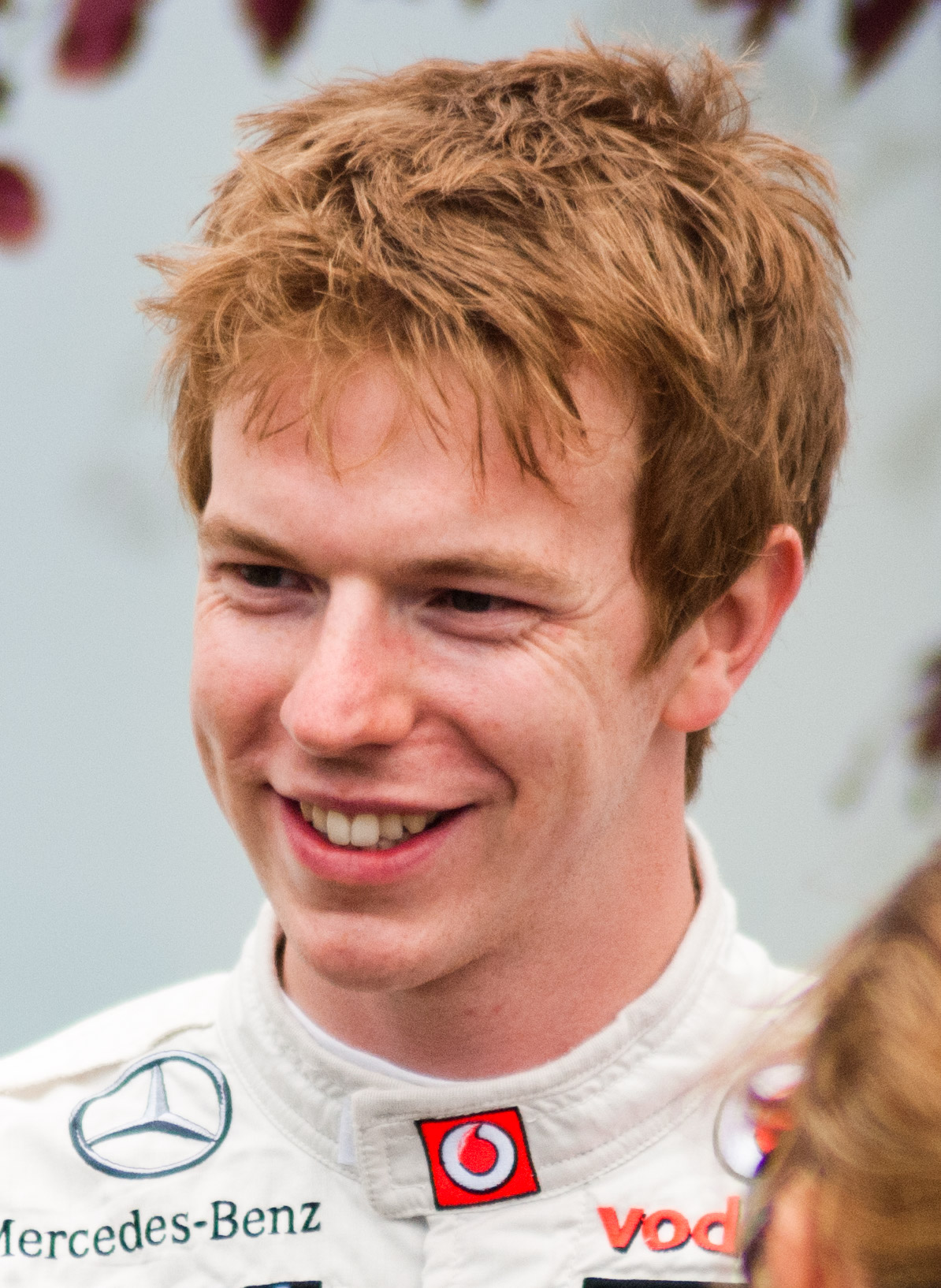
Oliver Turvey (pictured in 2014) clinched his and NIO's maiden podium finish.

Rosenqvist described his race as "one of those rare days when I can say it was quite a perfect Saturday" notwithstanding his early retirement, "Right from the practice sessions through to qualifying. I was out in front with a comfortable three second lead and it was getting better. It was all a bit too good to be true, but the issue was not in our hands." With regards to his inter-team systems glitch, Vergne revealed it prompted him to allow Buemi and Piquet through so that he could follow Buemi's strategy to allow him to reach the end of the race and gather championship points. Piquet spoke of his belief a better starting position would have helped him get on the podium, and attempted a different strategy, "Depending on who the players are around you, you want to risk overtaking or you want to try and save energy." Nevertheless, Piquet stated his belief Jaguar had the most reliable car in the field and the team would aim to continue improving for the rest of the season.

The incident where Lotterer caused ligament injuries to one of his mechanics was the first such occurrence of anyone sustaining an injury since the minimum pit stop time was abolished at the preceding Santiago ePrix. Lotterer spoke of his belief there would be another similar incident in the future, "Everyone is pushing the limits and the cars, they are so close together, there's not much space for the mechanic to jump off the car once the belts are done. But that's the same as other pitstops in other categories – mechanics change tyres [and] it always happens once in a while. This is part of racing." Scott Mitchell of Autosport noted the abolition of the minimum pit stop was one of Formula E's most unpopular changes and argued it promoted an unnecessary element of competition during the switch into a second car with regards to personal safety. Additionally, Rosenqvist's and Piquet's pit stops came under scrutiny from the motorsport press as it was theorised that their car's seat belts were altered illegally in order to decrease the time spent in their garages and risked infringing the revised FIA regulations concerning the new seat belts.

The consequence of the final positions increased Vergne's lead at the top of the Drivers' Championship to twelve points ahead of second-placed Rosenqvist. Bird kept third place notwithstanding him not scoring any points. Buemi's third-place finish drew him closer to Bird in the battle for third. Piquet's fourth-place result kept him in fifth. In the Teams' Championship, Techeetah further extended their advantage over Mahindra by another seven points. Jaguar overtook Virgin for third and e.Dams-Renault were fifth with seven rounds left in the season.

=== Race classification ===
Drivers who scored championship points are denoted in bold.

Final race classification
Pos.	No.	Driver	Team	Laps	Time/Retired	Grid	Points
1	**66**	**(Germany) Daniel Abt**	**Audi**	**47**	**50:45.164**	**5**	25
2	**16**	**(United Kingdom) Oliver Turvey**	**NIO**	**47**	**+6.398**	**2**	18
3	**9**	**(Switzerland) Sébastien Buemi**	**e.Dams-Renault**	**47**	**+6.615**	**3**	15
4	**3**	**(Brazil) Nelson Piquet Jr.**	**Jaguar**	**47**	**+7.015**	**7**	12
5	**25**	**(France) Jean-Éric Vergne**	**Techeetah-Renault**	**47**	**+7.546**	**6**	10
6	**20**	**(New Zealand) Mitch Evans**	**Jaguar**	**47**	**+9.050**	**12**	8
7	**28**	**(Portugal) António Félix da Costa**	**Andretti-BMW**	**47**	**+17.157**	**5**	6
8	**4**	**(Switzerland) Edoardo Mortara**	**Venturi**	**47**	**+26.511**	**18**	4
9	**1**	**(Brazil) Lucas di Grassi**	**Audi**	**47**	**+29.208**	**20**	2+1^{4}
10	**36**	**(United Kingdom) Alex Lynn**	**Virgin-Citroën**	**47**	**+29.515**	**10**	1
**11**	7	(Belgium) Jérôme d'Ambrosio	Dragon-Penske	47	+30.418	14	
**12**	6	(Argentina) José María López	Dragon-Penske	47	+31.859	13	
**13**	18	(Germany) André Lotterer	Techeetah-Renault	47	+36.206	9	
**14**	68	(Italy) Luca Filippi	NIO	47	+38.336	17	
**15**	27	(United Kingdom) Tom Blomqvist	Andretti-BMW	47	+38.592	16	
**16**	5	(Germany) Maro Engel	Venturi	47	+44.689	11	
**17**	2	(United Kingdom) Sam Bird	Virgin-Citroën	47	+44.982	19	
Ret	8	(France) Nico Prost	e.Dams-Renault	36	Suspension	15	
Ret	**19**	**(Sweden) Felix Rosenqvist**	**Mahindra**	**34**	**Energy**	**1**	3^{5}
Ret	23	(Germany) Nick Heidfeld	Mahindra	27	Water pump	8	

Notes:

- **^4** — One point for fastest lap.
- **^5** — Three points for pole position.

== Standings after the race ==
Drivers' Championship standings

+/–	Pos	Driver	Points
	1	(France) Jean-Éric Vergne	81
	2	(Sweden) Felix Rosenqvist	69 (−12)
	3	(United Kingdom) Sam Bird	61 (−20)
	4	(Switzerland) Sébastien Buemi	52 (−29)
	5	(Brazil) Nelson Piquet Jr.	45 (−36)

Teams' Championship standings

+/–	Pos	Constructor	Points
	1	(China) Techeetah-Renault	99
	2	(India) Mahindra	90 (−9)
1	3	(United Kingdom) Jaguar	74 (−25)
1	4	(United Kingdom) Virgin-Citroën	70 (−29)
	5	(France) e.Dams-Renault	59 (−40)

- Notes: Only the top five positions are included for both sets of standings.

== Notes and references ==
=== References ===
Previous race: 2018 Santiago ePrix	FIA Formula E Championship; 2017–18 season	Next race: 2018 Punta del Este ePrix
Previous race: 2017 Mexico City ePrix	Mexico City ePrix	Next race: 2019 Mexico City ePrix
