= Sam Bird =

British racing driver (born 1987)

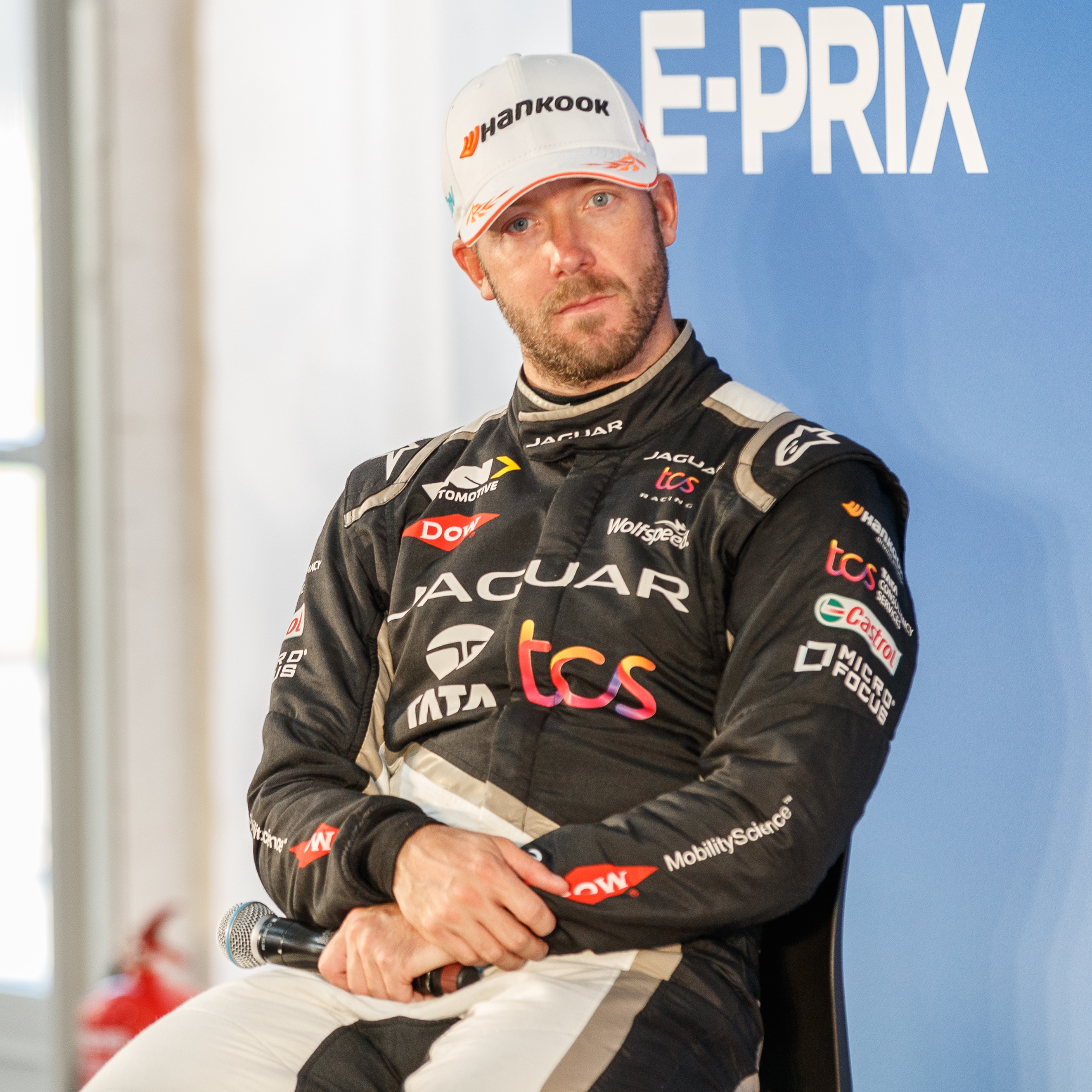
- Bird at the 2023 Berlin ePrix.
- Nationality: (United Kingdom) British
- Born: Sam Jamie Bird; 9 January 1987 (age 39) Roehampton, Greater London, England

Formula E career
- Debut season: 2014–15
- Categorisation: FIA Platinum
- Car number: 8
- Former teams: Virgin, Jaguar, McLaren
- Starts: 141
- Championships: 0
- Wins: 12
- Podiums: 27
- Poles: 6
- Fastest laps: 12
- Best finish: 3rd in 2017–18
- Finished last season: 18th (31 pts)

World Endurance Championship career
- Debut season: 2014
- Current team: AF Corse
- Car number: 71
- Former teams: G-Drive Racing
- Starts: 37
- Wins: 8
- Poles: 13
- Fastest laps: 4
- Best finish: 1st in 2015

24 Hours of Le Mans career
- Years: 2014–
- Teams: AF Corse, G-Drive Racing
- Best finish: 10 (2015)
- Class wins: 0

Previous series
- 2010–2011, 2013 2012 2009–10–2011 2008–09 2007, 2009 2006 2004–05: GP2 Series; Formula Renault 3.5 Series; GP2 Asia Series; Formula 3 Euro Series; British Formula 3 Formula Renault 2.0 UK; Formula BMW

Awards
- 2013 2006: Pirelli Trophy for Tyre Management; Autosport Club Driver/Year

Sam Jamie Bird (born 9 January 1987) is a British professional racing driver who serves as Nissan's reserve driver in Formula E.

Bird was a reserve driver for Mercedes in Formula One between 2010 and 2013, a period in which he came third in the Formula Renault 3.5 Series and second in the GP2 Series. Bird then entered Formula E with Virgin in 2014, and became one of the stars of the Gen1 era. He won his first ePrix at Putrajaya in 2014, and placed third in the championship in 2017–18. Bird moved to Jaguar in 2020, but was largely overshadowed by teammate Mitch Evans. He later spent two years at McLaren, before transitioning to a Nissan reserve role for 2025. Bird won twelve Formula E races over 11 seasons.

In parallel, Bird competed in the FIA World Endurance Championship, and won the LMP2 title for G-Drive Racing in 2015. Between 2016 and 2021, Bird was a Ferrari factory driver, winning four races in LMGTE Pro with Davide Rigon.

== Early racing career ==
=== Formula BMW ===
Bird made his name in single seater racing in the Formula BMW category, coming fourteenth overall in his debut season and second in the rookie cup. He came runner up in 2005, which was only his second season in the category and also came fourth in the Formula BMW world final, the race itself was won by German Marco Holzer.

=== Formula Renault ===
For 2006, Bird entered the British Formula Renault series, where he won four races and came fourth in the championship, 111 points behind series champion Sebastian Hohenthal.

=== Formula Three ===
==== 2007 ====
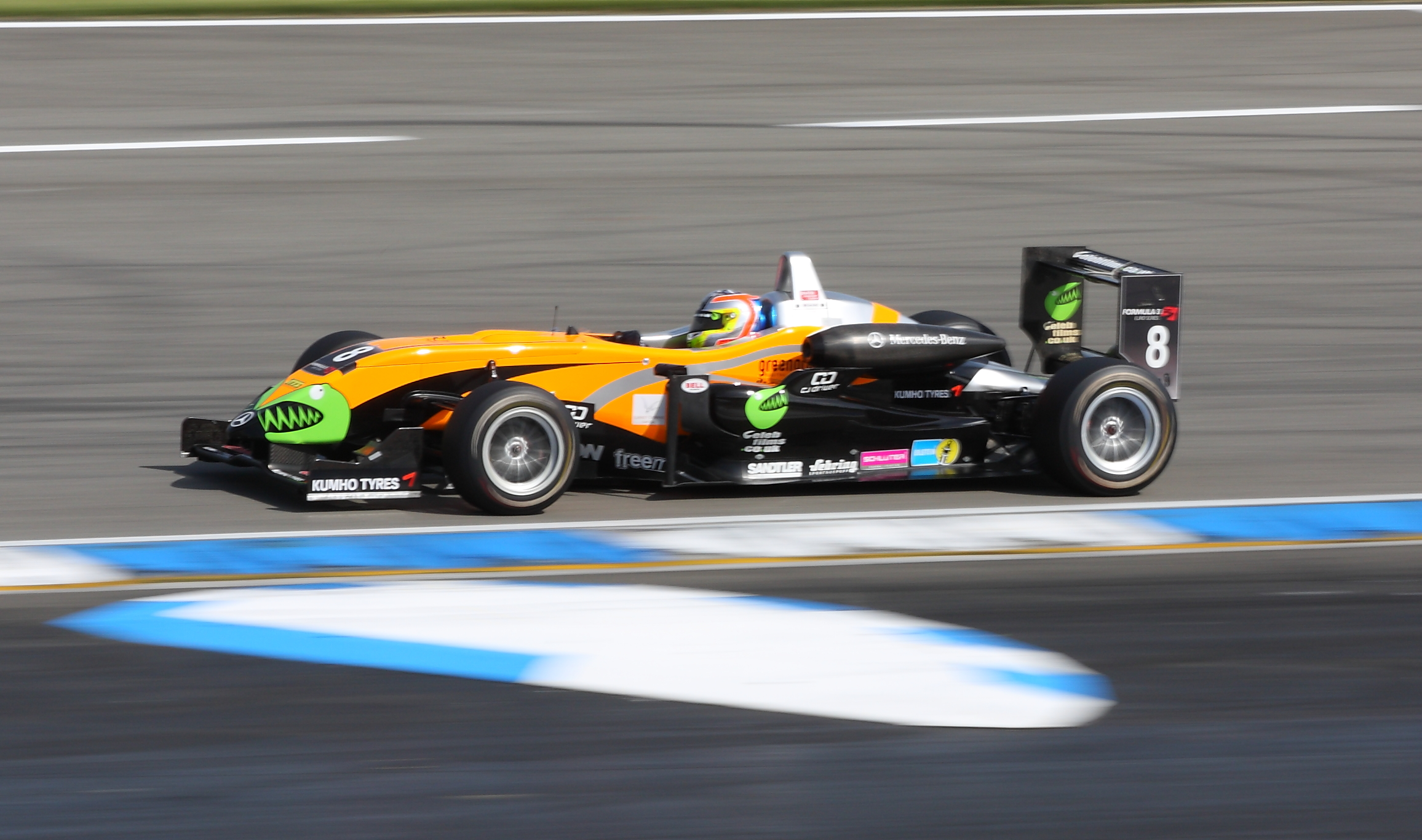
Bird driving in the Formula 3 Euro Series at the Hockenheimring (2009)

In 2007, Bird raced in the British Formula 3 Championship with Carlin Motorsport, in a Mercedes powered Dallara. In March 2007, Bird secured sponsorship from BP, "The brand is already prominent in the World Rally Championship" Mark Reader, BP's UK Fuels Marketing Manager, commented, "Sam's an incredible prospect and we're excited to be getting into a relationship at this stage of his career" he added. Bird was elected to the Motor Sports Association Race Elite Scheme in April 2007, along with five other drivers in various British series and also participated in a series of aerodynamic tests with the AT&T Williams F1 Team.

==== 2008 ====
Bird moved to Manor Motorsport in the Formula 3 Euro Series in 2008 and had a testing year, finishing eleventh in the championship with 23 points – 16 of which came from second places during Saturday races at Catalunya and Le Mans. He only picked up points from three other races. For 2009, he joined McLaren Autosport BRDC Award winner Alexander Sims, 2008 Mücke Motorsport driver Christian Vietoris and 2008 Formula BMW Europe runner-up Marco Wittmann at Mücke Motorsport. He earned his first pole position and fastest laps, but failed to win a race en route to eighth in the championship.

=== GP2 Series ===
Bird missed the final round of the F3 Euroseries season to join up with the ART Grand Prix team for a GP2 Asia Series test at the Yas Marina Circuit in Abu Dhabi. He raced in the 2009–10 season for the team, where he finished seventh in the series, with a second place in the final round.

==== 2010 ====
Bird contested the 2010 GP2 Series with ART, having long coveted a drive with the French team. He was fast but frequently unlucky, losing several potential results due to technical issues, engine failures and collisions for which he was not at fault. However, he managed to claim his maiden win in the series at the first race at Monza, as well as claiming his third fastest lap of the season.

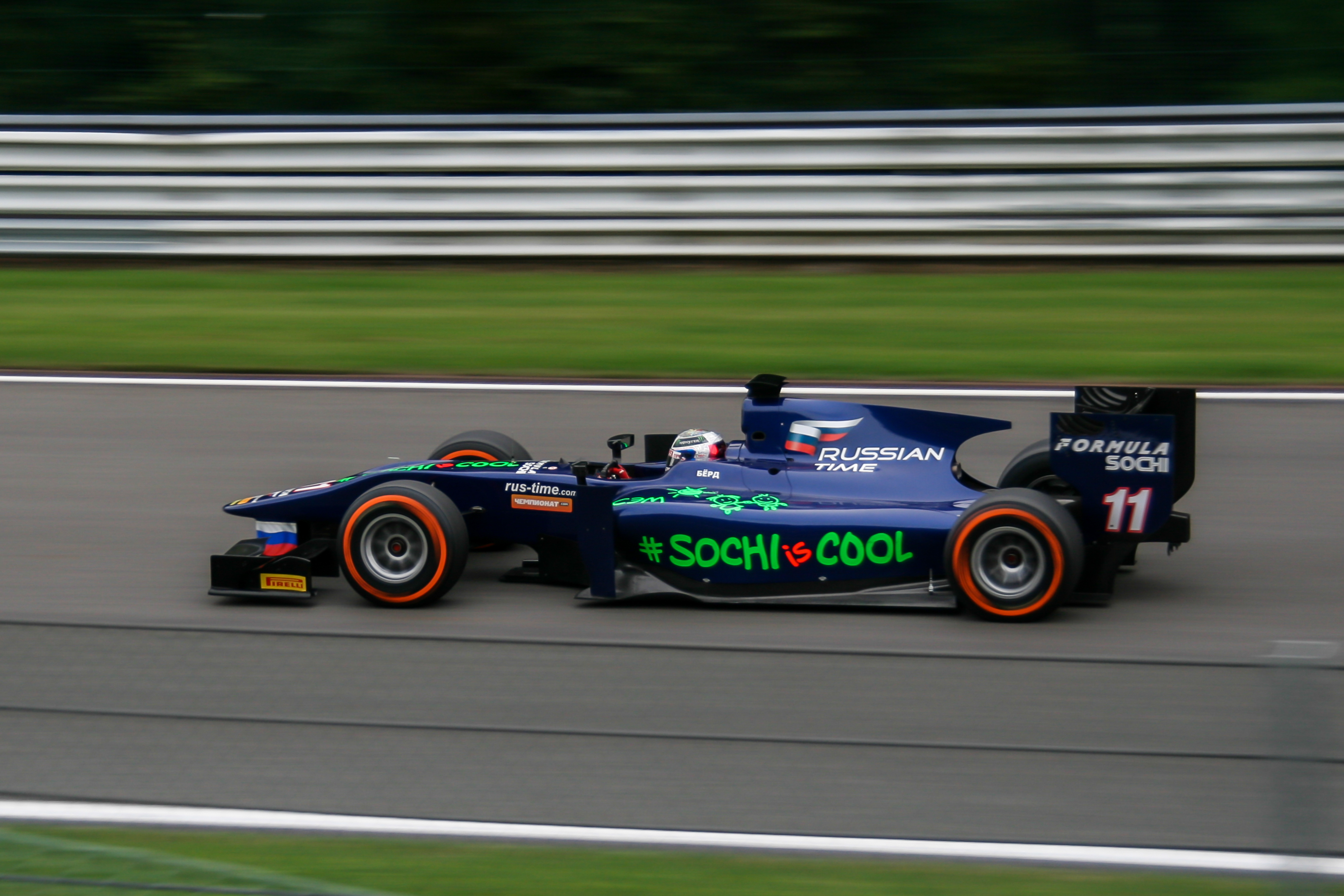
Bird during the feature race at the Belgian round of the 2013 GP2 Series

==== 2011 ====
For 2011, Bird moved to the iSport International team alongside Marcus Ericsson. His GP2 Asia campaign resulted in three retirements from the first four races but, after a strong start to the main series season, he was second in the Drivers' Championship - with the same number of points as leader Romain Grosjean. After this point, Bird gradually slipped back in the standings and finished sixth overall at the end of the season.

==== 2013 ====
Bird competed for the new Motopark-run Russian Time squad in 2013 and enjoyed a hugely successful season. He took five wins on the way to second place in the championship, having taken the championship fight right down to the last weekend. Bird's performances, alongside teammate Tom Dillmann, secured Russian Time first place in the GP2 Series constructors' championship.

=== Formula Renault 3.5 ===
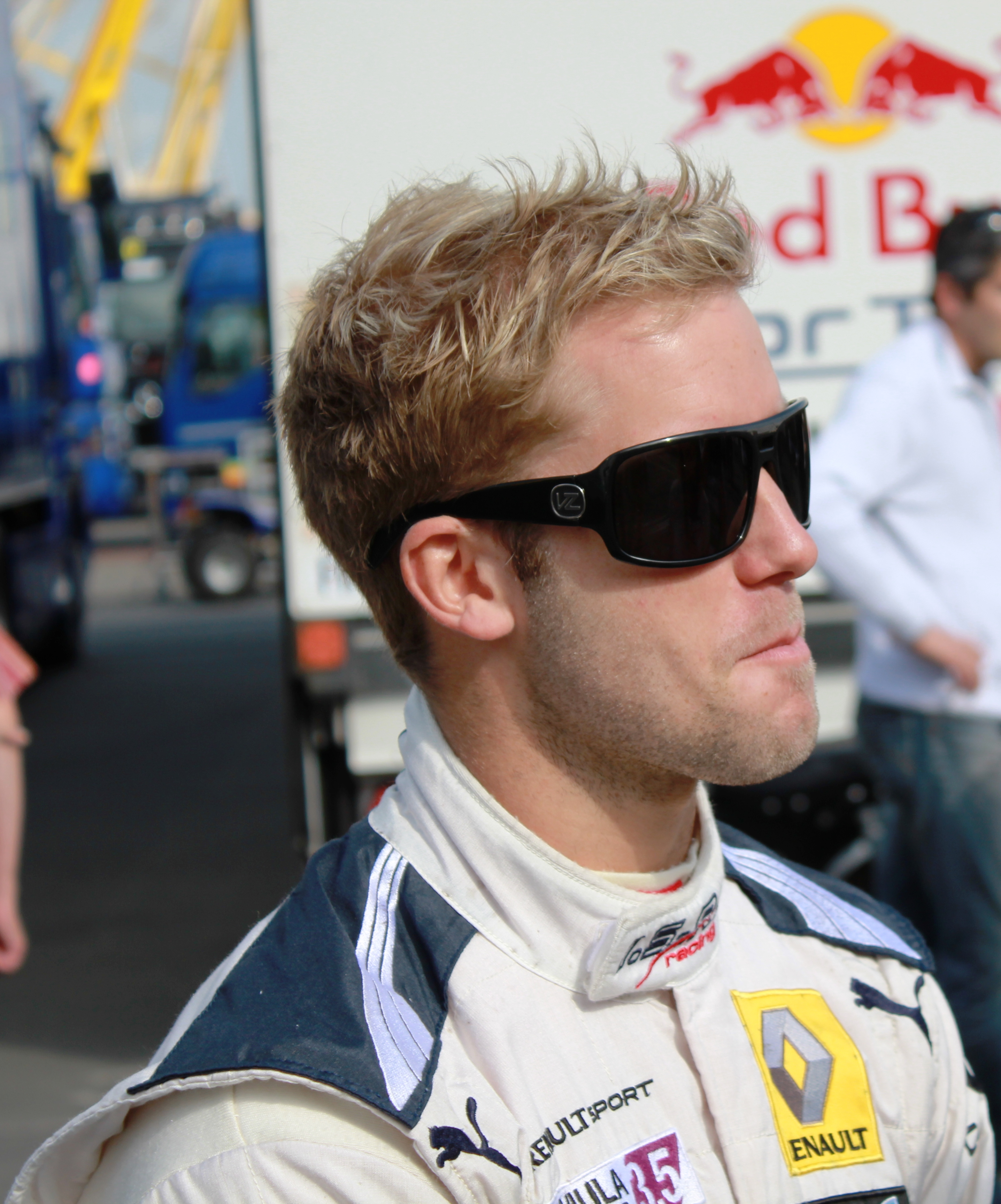
Bird while at ISR Racing in 2012

Between his last two seasons in the GP2 series, Bird competed in the 2012 Formula Renault 3.5 season. He won two races and took five further podium positions to head into the final round at Catalunya in a three-way battle for the title with Robin Frijns and Jules Bianchi. He lost out on the title by just ten points and ended up finishing third in the championship.

=== Formula One ===
On 16 November 2010, Bird took part in the young drivers test at the Yas Marina Circuit in Abu Dhabi, driving for Mercedes GP.

== Formula E ==
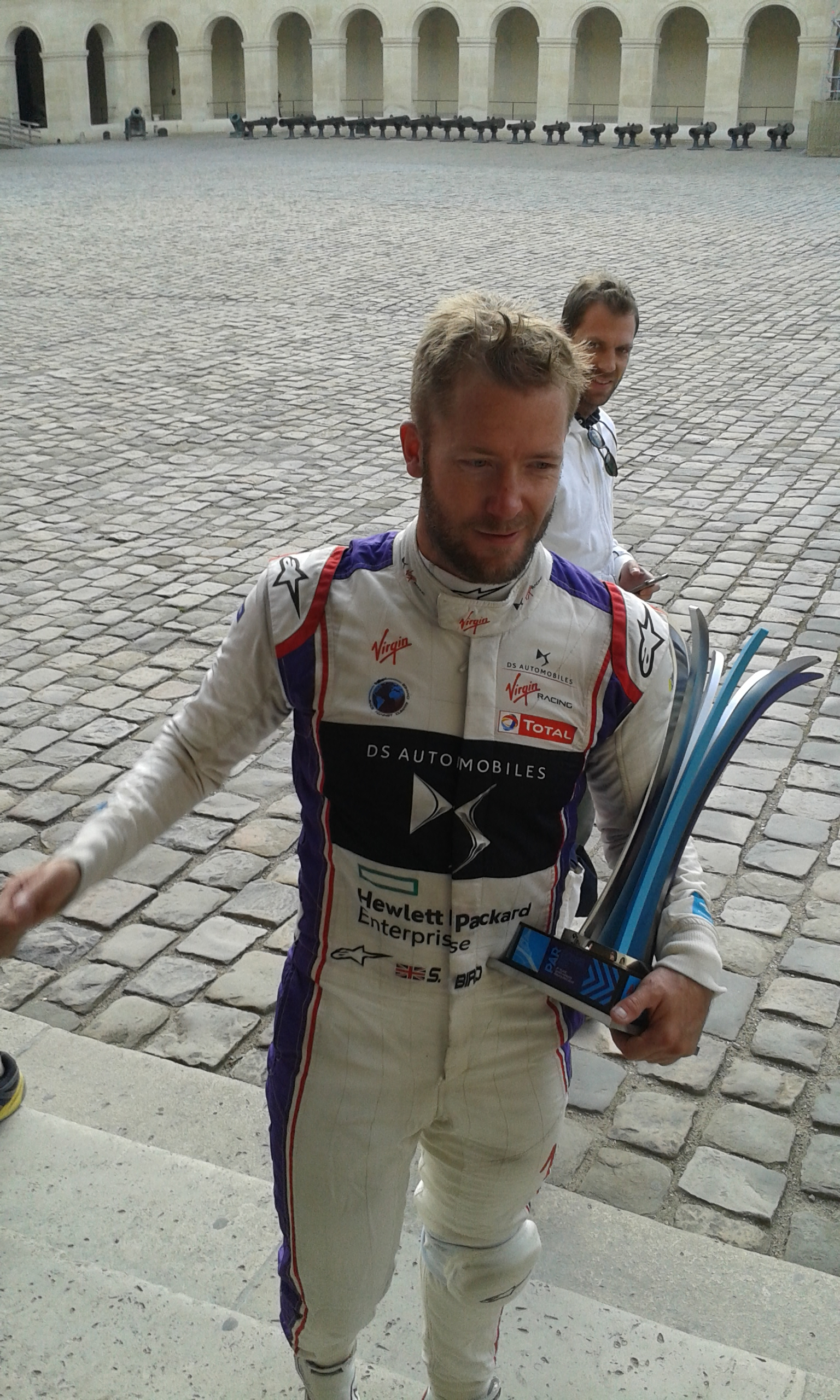
Bird (pictured at the 2018 Paris ePrix) had spent six seasons in the Virgin team before moving to Jaguar for the 2020–21 season.

=== DS/Envision Virgin Racing (2014–2020) ===
==== 2014–15 season ====
In the 2014–15 Formula E season, Bird began driving for Richard Branson's Virgin Racing alongside Jaime Alguersuari. He claimed third place in the first race, the Beijing ePrix, before dominating the second race of the season in Putrajaya to claim victory from second on the grid. At the following race in Punta del Este, he did not manage to qualify and so started from 18th place and soon retired from the race after a crash in the early stages. Bird bounced back by scoring points in Buenos Aires and Miami. However, the 2015 Long Beach ePrix was another race to forget for Bird: after starting 11th, he suffered a suspension failure on lap 11 and retired from the race. Bird managed to avoid the massive first-lap collision at the 2015 Monaco ePrix and went from his qualifying position of 12th to finish fourth. The final round of the season was the 2015 London ePrix, where Bird started from fourth and went on to cross the line second at his home ePrix. Race winner Stéphane Sarrazin received a 49-second penalty and so Bird was handed the win making him the first-ever Formula E driver to win their home race. He finished the season with 103 points and secured 5th place in the championship.

==== 2015–16 season ====
At the first race of the season in Beijing, Bird only managed to finish seventh. In the next race in Putrajaya, Bird took second place after Renault had a mechanical failure and the two Dragon cars of Loic Duval and Jerome d'Ambrosio had suspension failure while running second and third respectively. In the next race at Punta del Este, Bird finished second just behind Sebastien Buemi; in Buenos Aires, Bird won after fending off Buemi who started 18th and last. Further sixth places finishes were achieved in Mexico, Long Beach and Paris, before an 11th place finish in Berlin after contact in the race. At the first race of the double-season finale in London, Bird finished seventh. In next the next race, he was forced to retire due to a throttle failure. Bird eventually finished the season in fourth place with 88 points, after being overtaken by Nicolas Prost in the championship after he won the double-header in London.

==== 2016–17 season ====
Bird started his season with a 13th place finish in Hong Kong after leading the race and losing more than a minute during the pit-stop sequence. He bounced back from that result by finishing second in the following round at Marrakesh, after which Bird stated that "being on the podium [was] like a victory". Following a collision with Jérôme d'Ambrosio on the final lap in Buenos Aires, the Brit returned to the podium with a solid drive in the Mexico City ePrix. At Monaco, Bird damaged his car's suspension after hitting the barriers in the early stages of the race - he was still able to set the fastest lap in his second car. Following three races in which he only managed to collect a total of thirteen points, Bird became the first ever driver to win two back-to-back races in New York City. He would score two further top-five finishes at the races in Montreal and finished fourth in the drivers' standings, five positions ahead of teammate José María López.

==== 2017–18 season ====
At the season opener in Hong Kong, Bird started from second on the grid after having nearly spun his car at the hairpin on his flying lap. During the race, he passed Jean-Éric Vergne for the lead but crashed in the pitlane when coming in for his stop and hit a mechanic. Subsequently, he was given a drive-through penalty but ultimately still came out in the race lead and went on to win and take the lead in the driver's championship for the first time in his Formula E career. Bird was given a ten-place grid penalty for the incident and started the second race from thirteenth. He would finish in fifth, following the post-race disqualification of Daniel Abt, and retain his lead of the championship. Bird would go on to finish in third place in the championship with 143 points, just one point off second place finisher Lucas di Grassi.

==== 2018–19 season ====
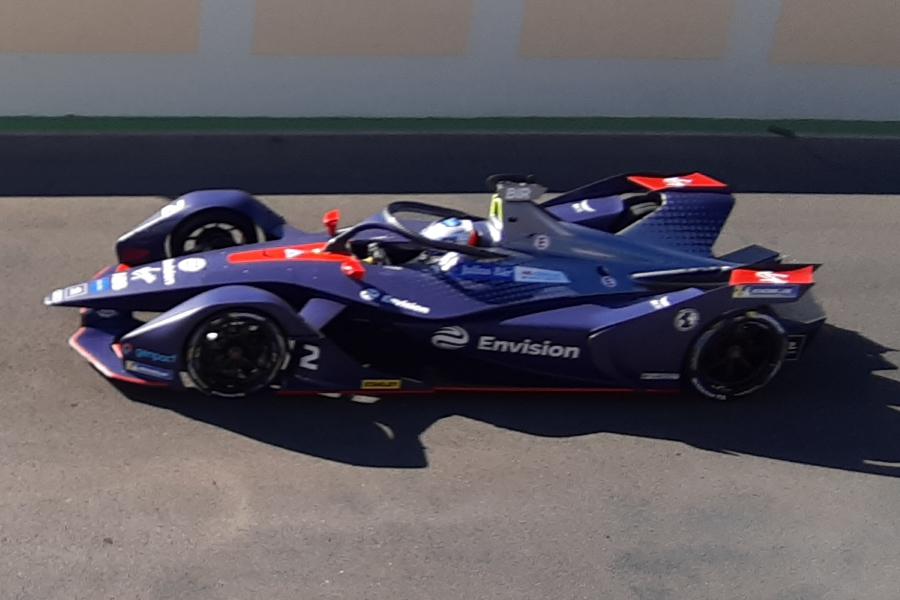
Bird at the 2019 Marrakesh ePrix

Bird's first podium finish of the season came in the 2019 Marrakesh ePrix, finishing in third after taking pole position. In 2019, he became the first Formula E driver to win a race in every Formula E season, after winning the 2019 Santiago ePrix. Ultimately, Bird finished the season in ninth place, amassing a total of 85 points over the season.

==== 2019–20 season ====
Bird won the opening race of the season, the 2019 Diriyah ePrix, for Envision Virgin Racing. Unfortunately, his race ended in the second round after a collision with Mitch Evans. In Santiago, Bird stormed from 16th to tenth, achieving the fastest lap of the race. In the 2020 Mexico City ePrix, he crashed out of second place in the dying stages of the race. In Marrakesh, he finished tenth again after starting 14th. The rest of the season was put on hold due to the COVID-19 pandemic, during which Bird announced that he was leaving Virgin to join Jaguar Racing. The season 6 finale was held at Tempelhof Airport Street Circuit, between the fifth and 13 August. Bird finished the first race in third and the second race in sixth. He finished the next three races in 13th, 11th, and 20th after being caught in a pile-up on the first lap. In his last race for Virgin, Bird finished fifth after starting 14th and taking the fastest lap. He finished the season ranked tenth in the standings with 63 points.

=== Jaguar Racing (2020–2023) ===
==== 2020–21 season ====
During the summer of 2020, Bird announced that he would be driving for the Jaguar Racing team in the 2020–21 Formula E season. In the second race of the campaign, Bird continued his streak of being the only driver to win a race in every season of Formula E, winning the second round of the Diriyah ePrix. A second place at the following race in Rome meant he took over from Nyck de Vries as championship leader ahead of former teammate Robin Frijns. After six DNFs (did not finish) and one DSQ (disqualification) during the season, he still managed to finish with 87 points in an impressive sixth place in the championship.

==== 2021–22 season ====
Throughout the season, Bird struggled with consistency and after five races had only achieved points in Diriyah and Rome. Other points finishes came in Berlin, Jakarta, Marrakesh, and New York. However, he never managed to achieve a finish higher than fourth. Bird had to miss both rounds of the Seoul ePrix after sustaining a broken hand during the London ePrix. His place was taken by Jaguar reserve driver Norman Nato. This was the first time in his Formula E career that Bird had failed to score either a win or a podium. He finished the season 13th with 51 points.

==== 2022–23 season ====
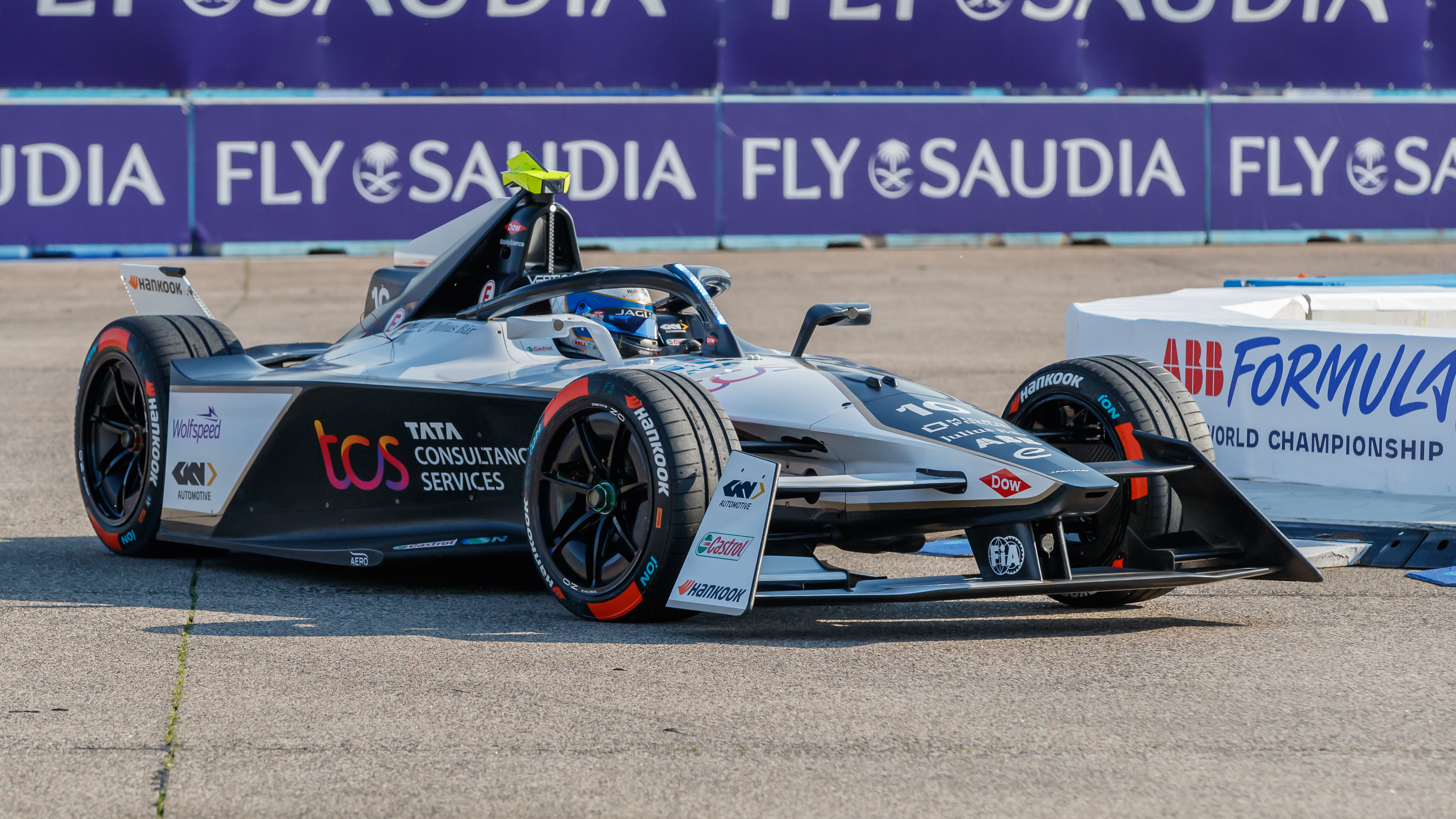
Bird at the 2023 Berlin ePrix

The 2023 season brought about a new set of regulations and the debut of the Gen 3 car, with Bird confident he turn around his fortune after a difficult 2022 season. He did, however, have a rude awakening as software problems hampered his preparations in practice for the Mexico City ePrix and he only qualified 21st. His race was not much better as it ended prematurely on lap 6 with a driveshaft failure. Stronger performances eventually occurred with podiums in Diriyah, São Paulo, Berlin and Rome. He consistently faltered as the season moved on and once again failed to secure a win for the second season. He finished eighth in the standings with 95 points. Bird left Jaguar after spending three seasons with the team at the end of the season.

=== McLaren (2024–2025) ===
==== 2023–24 season ====
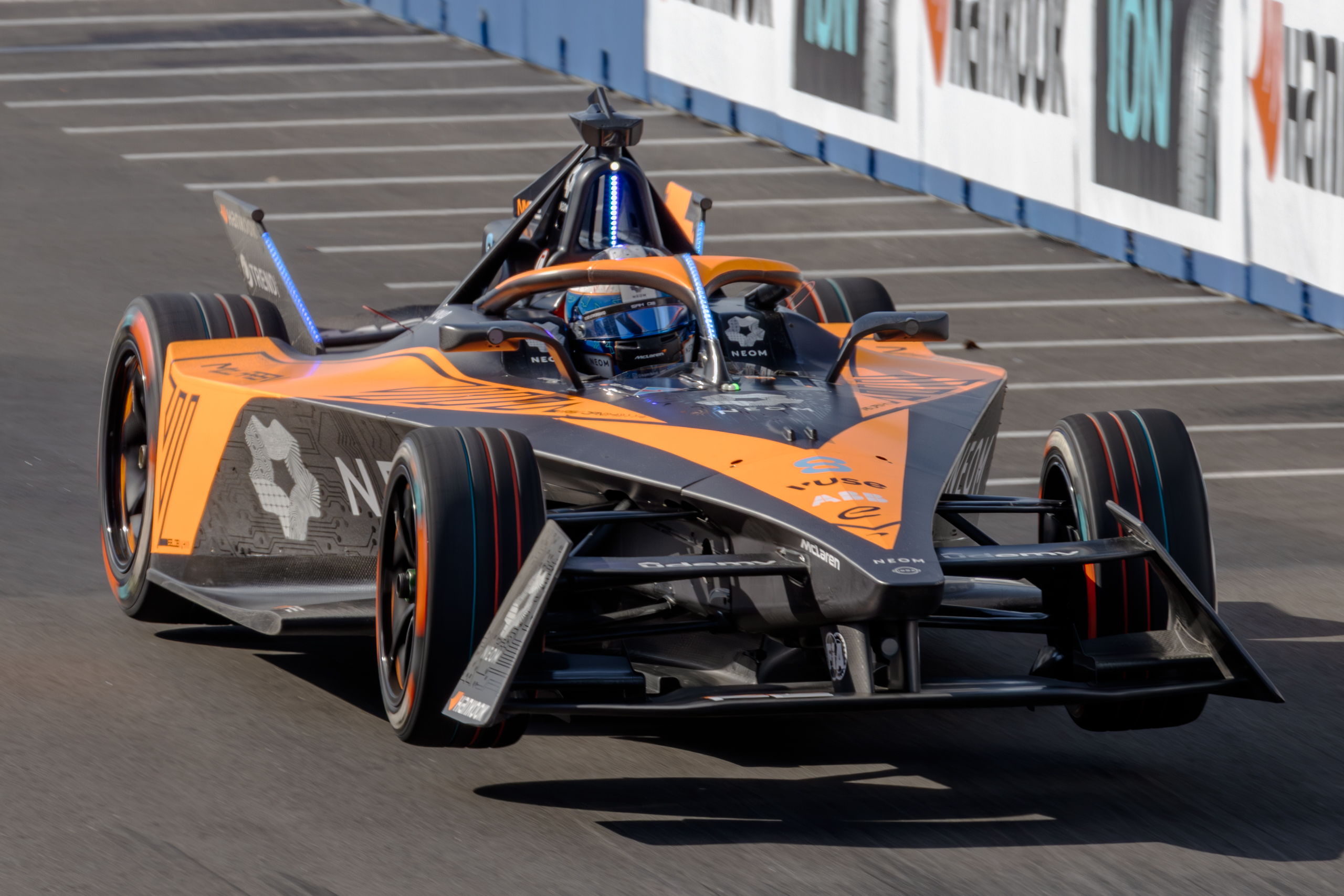
Bird at the 2024 Tokyo ePrix

In August 2023, McLaren announced the signing of Bird as René Rast's replacement and partnered Jake Hughes for the season. He got McLaren's maiden Formula E victory at the São Paulo ePrix. At the Monaco ePrix, Bird was ruled out of the weekend after suffering a hand injury following a crash during the first free practice. He was replaced by McLaren reserve and development driver Taylor Barnard.

==== 2024–25 season ====
Bird stayed with McLaren for the 2024–25 season, alongside Taylor Barnard who replaces Maserati-bound Jake Hughes. Bird departed from McLaren at the end of the season as the team exited Formula E.

=== Nissan reserve (2025–) ===
Having failed to secure a seat, Bird would move to Nissan to serve as the reserve and development driver during the 2025–26 season.

== Endurance racing ==
=== World Endurance Championship ===
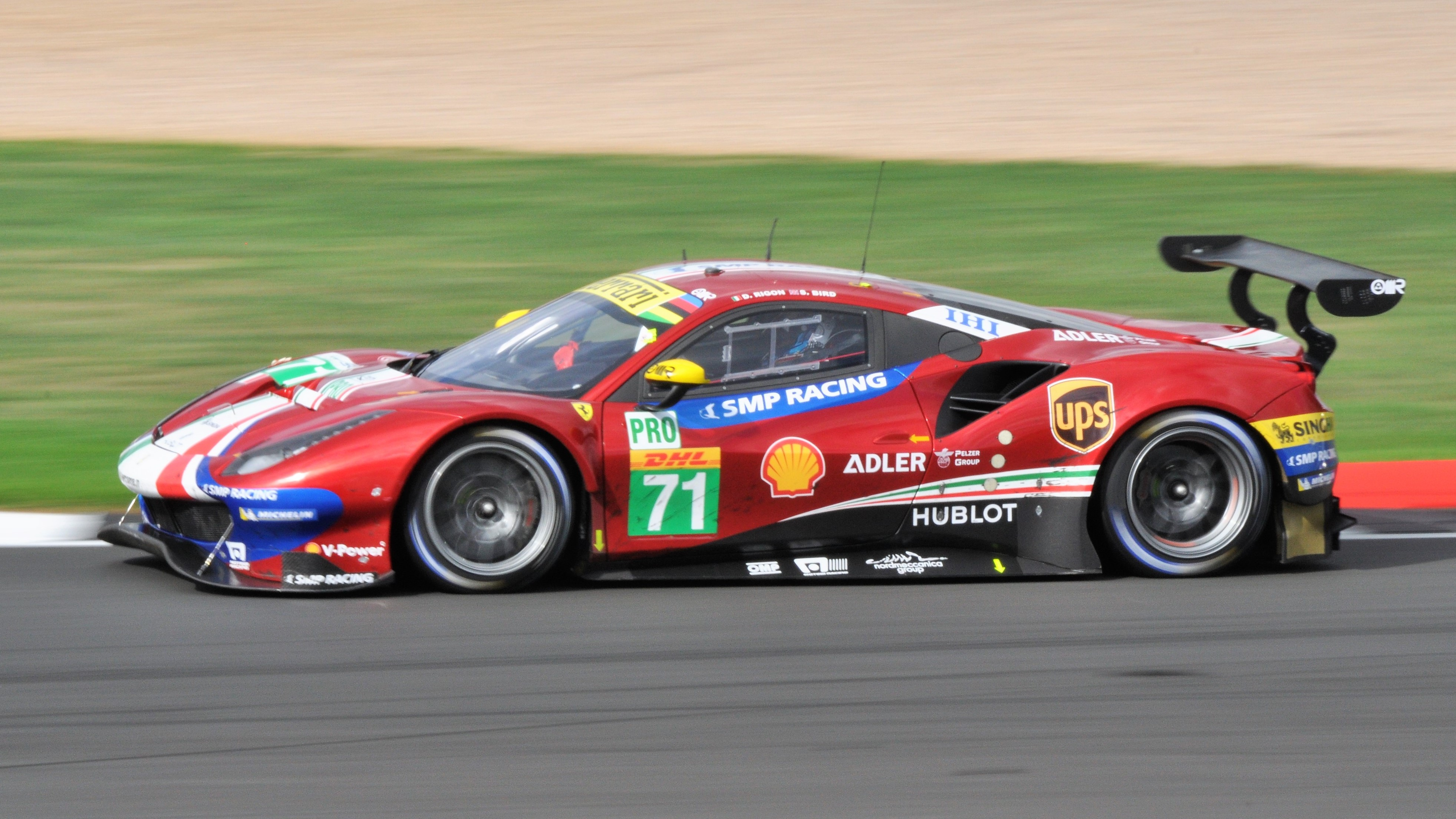
Bird racing in the 2018 6 Hours of Silverstone.

In 2014, Bird made two guest appearances for the Ferrari AF Corse team. The first was at his home race in Britain for the 6 hours of Silverstone where he came third in the GTE Amateur class. His second appearance was at the legendary 24 Hours of Le Mans. Bird took pole position in the GTE Am class, second overall of all GT cars. He ran in the first stint of the race, holding the GTE Am lead until he collided with a pair of front-running LMP1 cars (the No. 3 Audi and a Toyota) in wet conditions on the Mulsanne Straight.

== Personal life ==
From six years old, Bird attended Milbourne Lodge School until thirteen. He was educated at Charterhouse School until GCSE level, after which he attended Millfield School in Somerset. Bird is a keen football fan and an avid supporter of Manchester United F.C.

== Racing record ==
=== Racing career summary ===
Season	Series	Team name	Races	Wins	Poles	F/Laps	Podiums	Points	Position
2004	Formula BMW UK	Carlin Motorsport	20	0	0	0	0	22	14th
2005	Formula BMW UK	Fortec Motorsport	20	6	9	3	12	218	**2nd**
2005	Formula BMW World Final	Fortec Motorsport	1	0	0	0	0	N/A	4th
2006	Formula Renault UK	Fortec Motorsport	20	4	7	5	7	373	4th
2007	British Formula 3 International Series	Carlin Motorsport	22	2	0	1	10	180	4th
2007	Macau Grand Prix	Carlin Motorsport	1	0	0	0	0	N/A	6th
2007	Masters of Formula 3	Carlin Motorsport	1	0	0	0	0	N/A	27th
2008	Formula 3 Euro Series	Manor Motorsport	20	0	0	0	2	23	11th
2008	Macau Grand Prix	Manor Motorsport	1	0	0	0	0	N/A	NC
2008	Masters of Formula 3	Manor Motorsport	1	0	0	0	0	N/A	7th
2009	Formula 3 Euro Series	Mücke Motorsport	18	0	1	2	4	40	8th
2009	Masters of Formula 3	Mücke Motorsport	1	0	0	0	0	N/A	8th
2009	British Formula 3 International Series	Fortec Motorsport	2	0	0	0	0	0	NC†
2009	Macau Grand Prix	ART Grand Prix	1	0	0	0	1	N/A	**3rd**
2009–10	GP2 Asia Series	ART Grand Prix	8	0	0	1	1	12	7th
2010	GP2 Series	ART Grand Prix	20	1	1	4	5	48	5th
2010	Formula One	Mercedes GP Petronas F1 Team	Test driver						
2011	GP2 Asia Series	iSport International	4	0	0	0	0	2	12th
2011	GP2 Series	iSport International	18	0	1	1	3	45	6th
2011	Formula One	Mercedes GP Petronas F1 Team	Test and reserve driver						
2012	Formula Renault 3.5 Series	ISR Racing	17	2	1	0	7	177	**3rd**
2012	Formula One	Mercedes AMG Petronas F1 Team	Test and reserve driver						
2013	GP2 Series	Russian Time	22	5	2	3	6	181	**2nd**
2013	Formula One	Mercedes AMG Petronas F1 Team	Test and reserve driver						
2014	FIA World Endurance Championship - LMGTE Am	AF Corse	2	0	2	1	1	17	16th
2014	24 Hours of Le Mans - LMGTE Am	AF Corse	1	0	1	0	0	N/A	DNF
2014	United SportsCar Championship - PC	Starworks Motorsport	4	0	0	0	1	29	40th
2014–15	Formula E	Virgin Racing	11	2	0	2	3	103	5th
2015	FIA World Endurance Championship - LMP2	G-Drive Racing	8	4	4	1	7	178	**1st**
2015	24 Hours of Le Mans - LMP2	G-Drive Racing	1	0	1	0	0	N/A	**3rd**
2015–16	Formula E	DS Virgin Racing	10	1	3	0	2	88	4th
2016	FIA World Endurance Championship - LMGTE Pro	AF Corse	9	2	2	1	5	134	**2nd**
2016	24 Hours of Le Mans - LMGTE Pro	AF Corse	1	0	0	0	0	N/A	DNF
2016–17	Formula E	DS Virgin Racing	12	2	1	2	4	122	4th
2017	FIA World Endurance Championship - LMGTE Pro	AF Corse	8	2	4	1	4	139	5th
2017	24 Hours of Le Mans - LMGTE Pro	AF Corse	1	0	0	0	0	N/A	5th
2017	IMSA SportsCar Championship - GTD	Scuderia Corsa	1	0	0	0	0	15	74th
2017–18	Formula E	DS Virgin Racing	12	2	0	1	6	143	**3rd**
2018	IMSA SportsCar Championship - GTD	Scuderia Corsa	1	0	0	0	0	26	51st
2018	24 Hours of Le Mans - LMGTE Pro	AF Corse	1	0	0	0	0	N/A	9th
2018–19	Formula E	Envision Virgin Racing	13	1	1	0	2	85	9th
2018–19	FIA World Endurance Championship - LMGTE Pro	AF Corse	8	0	0	1	1	54.5	12th
2019	Blancpain GT Series Endurance Cup	AF Corse	1	0	0	0	0	0	NC
2019	24 Hours of Le Mans - LMGTE Pro	AF Corse	1	0	0	0	0	N/A	DNF
2019	Intercontinental GT Challenge	AF Corse	1	0	0	0	0	0	NC
2019–20	Formula E	Envision Virgin Racing	11	1	0	1	2	63	10th
2019–20	FIA World Endurance Championship - LMGTE Pro	AF Corse	1	0	0	0	0	0	47th
2020	24 Hours of Le Mans - LMGTE Pro	AF Corse	1	0	0	0	0	N/A	NC
2020–21	Formula E	Jaguar Racing	15	2	1	0	3	87	6th
2021	FIA World Endurance Championship - LMGTE Pro	AF Corse	1	0	1	1	0	3	25th
2021	24 Hours of Le Mans - LMGTE Pro	AF Corse	1	0	0	0	0	N/A	5th
2021–22	Formula E	Jaguar TCS Racing	14	0	0	1	0	51	13th
2022	24 Hours of Le Mans - LMGTE Pro	Riley Motorsports	1	0	0	0	0	N/A	5th
2022–23	Formula E	Jaguar TCS Racing	14	0	0	2	4	95	8th
2023–24	Formula E	NEOM McLaren Formula E Team	13	1	0	1	1	48	13th
2024–25	Formula E	NEOM McLaren Formula E Team	16	0	0	2	0	31	18th
2025–26	Formula E	Nissan Formula E Team	Reserve driver						
2026–27	Formula E	Nissan Formula E Team	Reserve driver						

^{†} As Bird was a guest driver, he was ineligible for points.
^{*} Season still in progress.

=== Complete Formula BMW UK results ===
key) (Races in bold indicate pole position; races in italics indicate fastest lap)

Year	Entrant	1	2	3	4	5	6	7	8	9	10	11	12	13	14	15	16	17	18	19	20	DC	Points
2004	Carlin Motorsport	THR; 1; 17	THR; 2; 17	BRH1; 1; 19	BRH1; 2; 10	SIL; 1; 12	SIL; 2; 12	OUL; 1; 4	OUL; 2; 5	MON; 1; 10	MON; 2; 16	CRO; 1; 14	CRO; 2; 14	KNO; 1; 11	KNO; 2; 12	BRH2; 1; 9	BRH2; 2; 13	ROC; 1 Ret	ROC; 2; 16	DON; 1; 11	DON; 2; 15	14th	22
2005	Fortec Motorsport	DON; 1; 4	DON; 2; 3	**THR**; **1**; 2	**THR**; **2**; 2	ROC; 1 Ret	ROC; 2 Ret	BRH1; 1; 2	**BRH1**; **2**; 1	**OUL**; **1**; 1	**OUL**; **2**; 1	**CRO**; **1**; 1	**CRO**; **2**; 1	MON; 1; 7	**MON**; **2**; 6	KNO; 1; 10	KNO; 2 Ret	SIL; 1; 1	SIL; 2 Ret	BRH2; 1 Ret	BRH2; 2; 2	2nd	218

=== Complete Formula Renault UK results ===
key) (Races in bold indicate pole position; races in italics indicate fastest lap)

Year	Entrant	1	2	3	4	5	6	7	8	9	10	11	12	13	14	15	16	17	18	19	20	DC	Points
2006	Fortec Motorsports	BRH1; 1; 7	BRH1; 2; 12	OUL; 1 Ret	**OUL**; **2**; 4	THR; 1; 8	THR; 2; 3	KNO; 1; 10	**KNO**; **2**; 1	CRO; 1; 1	CRO; 2; 6	DON; 1; 19	DON; 2 Ret	SNE; 1; 6	SNE; 2; 4	**DON**; **1**; 1	DON; 2; 2	BRH2; 1; 4	**BRH2**; **2**; 1	**SIL**; **1**; 2	**SIL**; **2** EX	4th	373

=== Complete British Formula Three Championship results ===
key) (Races in bold indicate pole position; races in italics indicate fastest lap)

Year	Entrant	Chassis	Engine	1	2	3	4	5	6	7	8	9	10	11	12	13	14	15	16	17	18	19	20	21	22	DC	Points
2007	Carlin Motorsport	Dallara F307	Mercedes	OUL; 1; 4	OUL; 2; 6	DON; 1; 10	DON; 2; 9	BUC; 1; 3	BUC; 2; 1	SNE; 1; 2	SNE; 2; 3	MNZ; 1; 2	MNZ; 2; 3	BRH; 1 Ret	BRH; 2; 11	SPA; 1; 1	SPA; 2; 3	SIL; 1; 6	SIL; 2; 6	THR; 1 Ret	THR; 2 Ret	CRO; 1; 2	CRO; 2 Ret	ROC; 1 Ret	ROC; 2; 2	4th	180
2009	Fortec Motorsport	Dallara F309	Mercedes HWA	OUL; 1	OUL; 2	SIL; 1	SIL; 2	ROC; 1	ROC; 2	HOC; 1	HOC; 2	SNE; 1	SNE; 2	DON; 1	DON; 2	SPA; 1	SPA; 2	SIL; 1	SIL; 2	ALG; 1 Ret	ALG; 2; 2	BRH; 1	BRH; 2			NC	0

=== Complete Formula 3 Euro Series results ===
key) (Races in bold indicate pole position; races in italics indicate fastest lap)

Year	Entrant	Chassis	Engine	1	2	3	4	5	6	7	8	9	10	11	12	13	14	15	16	17	18	19	20	DC	Points
2008	Manor Motorsport	Dallara F308/036	Mercedes	HOC; 1; 10	HOC; 2; 6	MUG; 1; 14	MUG; 2; 8	PAU; 1 Ret	PAU; 2; 11	NOR; 1; 14	NOR; 2; 8	ZAN; 1; 4	ZAN; 2; 6	NÜR; 1; 22	NÜR; 2; 19	BRH; 1 Ret	BRH; 2; 19	CAT; 1; 2	CAT; 2; 18	BUG; 1; 2	BUG; 2; 11	HOC; 1; 16	HOC; 2 Ret	11th	23
2009	Mücke Motorsport	Dallara F308/042	Mercedes	**HOC**; **1**; 3	HOC; 2; 6	LAU; 1; 5	LAU; 2; 3	NOR; 1; 8	NOR; 2 Ret	ZAN; 1; 8	ZAN; 2; 2	OSC; 1; 12	OSC; 2; 20	NÜR; 1; 4	NÜR; 2; 8	BRH; 1; 6	BRH; 2; 3	CAT; 1 Ret	CAT; 2 Ret	DIJ; 1; 6	DIJ; 2; 5	HOC; 1	HOC; 2	8th	40

=== Complete GP2 Series results ===
(key) (Races in bold indicate pole position; races in italics indicate fastest lap)

Year	Entrant	1	2	3	4	5	6	7	8	9	10	11	12	13	14	15	16	17	18	19	20	21	22	DC	Points
2010	ART Grand Prix	CAT; FEA; 9	CAT; SPR; 4	MON; FEA; 18	MON; SPR; 10	IST; FEA; 3	IST; SPR; 10	VAL; FEA; 3	VAL; SPR; 10	SIL; FEA; 4	SIL; SPR; DNS	HOC; FEA; 14	HOC; SPR; 5	**HUN**; **FEA**; 13	HUN; SPR; Ret	SPA; FEA; Ret	SPA; SPR; 12	MNZ; FEA; 1	MNZ; SPR; 3	YMC; FEA; 3	YMC; SPR; Ret			5th	48
2011	iSport International	IST; FEA; 2	IST; SPR; 3	CAT; FEA; 3	CAT; SPR; 5	**MON**; **FEA**; Ret	MON; SPR; 13	VAL; FEA; 5	VAL; SPR; 12	SIL; FEA; 5	SIL; SPR; 6	NÜR; FEA; 8	NÜR; SPR; 7	HUN; FEA; 17	HUN; SPR; 5	SPA; FEA; 12	SPA; SPR; 5	MNZ; FEA; 4	MNZ; SPR; 4					6th	45
2013	Russian Time	SEP; FEA; 7	SEP; SPR; Ret	BHR; FEA; 6	BHR; SPR; 1	CAT; FEA; 21†	CAT; SPR; 12	MON; FEA; 1	MON; SPR; 24	SIL; FEA; 1	SIL; SPR; 5	NÜR; FEA; 13	NÜR; SPR; 8	HUN; FEA; 10	HUN; SPR; 8	**SPA**; **FEA**; 1	SPA; SPR; 14	**MNZ**; **FEA**; 2	MNZ; SPR; 4	MRN; FEA; 8	MRN; SPR; 1	YMC; FEA; 10	YMC; SPR; 4	2nd	181

==== Complete GP2 Asia Series results ====
(key) (Races in bold indicate pole position; races in italics indicate fastest lap)

Year	Entrant	1	2	3	4	5	6	7	8	DC	Points
2009–10	ART Grand Prix	YMC1; FEA; 18	YMC1; SPR; 18	YMC2; FEA; Ret	YMC2; SPR; Ret	BHR1; FEA; 13	BHR1; SPR; 4	BHR2; FEA; 6	BHR2; SPR; 2	7th	12
2011	iSport International	YMC; FEA; 7	YMC; SPR; Ret	IMO; FEA; Ret	IMO; SPR; Ret					12th	2

=== Complete Formula Renault 3.5 Series results ===
(key) (Races in bold indicate pole position; races in italics indicate fastest lap)

Year	Team	1	2	3	4	5	6	7	8	9	10	11	12	13	14	15	16	17	Pos	Points
2012	ISR	ALC; 1; 9	ALC; 2; 2	**MON**; **1**; 1	SPA; 1; 3	SPA; 2; 5	NÜR; 1; 8	NÜR; 2; 4	MSC; 1; 3	MSC; 2 Ret	SIL; 1 Ret	SIL; 2; 1	HUN; 1; 10	HUN; 2; 4	LEC; 1; 10	LEC; 2; 3	CAT; 1; 2	CAT; 2; 8	3rd	177

=== Complete FIA World Endurance Championship results ===
(key) (Races in bold indicate pole position; races in italics indicate fastest lap)

Year	Entrant	Class	Car	Engine	1	2	3	4	5	6	7	8	9	Rank	Points
2014	AF Corse	LMGTE Am	Ferrari 458 Italia GT2	Ferrari F136 4.5 L V8	**SIL**; 3	SPA	**LMS**; Ret	COA	FUJ	SHA	BHR	SÃO		16th	17
2015	G-Drive Racing	LMP2	Ligier JS P2	Nissan VK45DE 4.5 L V8	SIL; 1	**SPA**; 9	LMS; 2	NÜR; 2	**COA**; 1	**FUJ**; 1	**SHA**; 2	BHR; 1		1st	178
2016	AF Corse	LMGTE Pro	Ferrari 488 GTE	Ferrari F154CB 3.9 L Turbo V8	**SIL**; 1	**SPA**; 1	LMS; Ret	NÜR; 2	MEX; 4	COA; 3	FUJ; 4	SHA; 5	BHR; 3	2nd	134
2017	AF Corse	LMGTE Pro	Ferrari 488 GTE	Ferrari F154CB 3.9 L Turbo V8	SIL; 5	**SPA**; 1	LMS; 4	NÜR	**MEX**; 2	**COA**; 3	FUJ; 5	SHA; 6	**BHR**; 1	5th	139
2018–19	AF Corse	LMGTE Pro	Ferrari 488 GTE Evo	Ferrari F154CB 3.9 L Turbo V8	SPA; 3	LMS; 6	SIL; 16	FUJ; 10	SHA; 6	SEB; 6	SPA; 6	LMS; Ret		12th	54.5
2019–20	AF Corse	LMGTE Pro	Ferrari 488 GTE Evo	Ferrari F154CB 3.9 L Turbo V8	SIL	FUJ	SHA	BHR	COA	SPA	LMS; NC	BHR		47th	0
2021	AF Corse	LMGTE Pro	Ferrari 488 GTE Evo	Ferrari F154CB 3.9 L Turbo V8	SPA	ALG	MNZ	**LMS**; 10	BHR	BHR				25th	3

=== Complete 24 Hours of Le Mans results ===
Year	Team	Co-Drivers	Car	Class	Laps	Pos.	Class Pos.
2014	(Italy) AF Corse	(Australia) Stephen Wyatt (Italy) Michele Rugolo	Ferrari 458 Italia GT2	GTE; Am	22	DNF	DNF
2015	(Russia) G-Drive Racing	(Russia) Roman Rusinov (France) Julien Canal	Ligier JS P2-Nissan	LMP2	358	10th	**3rd**
2016	(Italy) AF Corse	(Italy) Andrea Bertolini (Italy) Davide Rigon	Ferrari 488 GTE	GTE; Pro	143	DNF	DNF
2017	(Italy) AF Corse	(Italy) Davide Rigon (Spain) Miguel Molina	Ferrari 488 GTE	GTE; Pro	339	21st	5th
2018	(Italy) AF Corse	(Italy) Davide Rigon (Spain) Miguel Molina	Ferrari 488 GTE Evo	GTE; Pro	338	24th	9th
2019	(Italy) AF Corse	(Italy) Davide Rigon (Spain) Miguel Molina	Ferrari 488 GTE Evo	GTE; Pro	140	DNF	DNF
2020	(Italy) AF Corse	(Italy) Davide Rigon (Spain) Miguel Molina	Ferrari 488 GTE Evo	GTE; Pro	340	NC	NC
2021	(Italy) AF Corse	(Brazil) Daniel Serra (Spain) Miguel Molina	Ferrari 488 GTE Evo	GTE; Pro	331	37th	5th
2022	(United States) Riley Motorsports	(Brazil) Felipe Fraga (New Zealand) Shane van Gisbergen	Ferrari 488 GTE Evo	GTE; Pro	347	32nd	5th

=== Complete IMSA SportsCar Championship results ===
(key) (Races in bold indicate pole position; races in italics indicate fastest lap)

Year	Entrant	Class	Make	Engine	1	2	3	4	5	6	7	8	9	10	11	12	Rank	Points
2014	Starworks Motorsport	PC	Oreca FLM09	Chevrolet LS3 6.2 L V8	DAY; 5	SEB; 3	LGA; 9	KAN	WGL; 5	IMS	ELK	VIR	COA	PET			40th	29
2017	Scuderia Corsa	GTD	Ferrari 488 GT3	Ferrari F154CB 3.9 L Turbo V8	DAY; 16	SEB	LBH	COA	DET	WGL	MOS	LIM	ELK	VIR	LGA	PET	74th	15
2018	Scuderia Corsa	GTD	Ferrari 488 GT3	Ferrari F154CB 3.9 L Turbo V8	DAY; 5	SEB	MDO	DET	WGL	MOS	LIM	ELK	VIR	LGA	PET		51st	26

=== Complete Formula E results ===
(key) (Races in bold indicate pole position; races in italics indicate fastest lap)

Year	Team	Chassis	Powertrain	1	2	3	4	5	6	7	8	9	10	11	12	13	14	15	16	Pos	Points
2014–15	Virgin Racing	Spark SRT01-e	SRT01-e	BEI; 3	PUT; 1	PDE; Ret	BUE; 7	MIA; 8	LBH; Ret	MCO; 4	BER; 8	MSC; Ret	LDN; 6	LDN; 1						5th	103
2015–16	DS Virgin Racing	Spark SRT01-e	Virgin Racing Engineering DSV-01	BEI; 7	PUT; 2	PDE; Ret	**BUE**; 1	MEX; 6	**LBH**; 6	**PAR**; 6	BER; 11	LDN; 7	LDN; Ret							4th	88
2016–17	DS Virgin Racing	Spark SRT01-e	DS Virgin DSV-02	HKG; 13	MRK; 2	BUE; Ret	MEX; 3	MCO; Ret	PAR; 16	BER; 7	BER; 7	NYC; 1	**NYC**; 1	MTL; 5	MTL; 4					4th	122
2017–18	DS Virgin Racing	Spark SRT01-e	DS Virgin DSV-03	HKG; 1	HKG; 5	MRK; 3	SCL; 5	MEX; 17	PDE; 3	RME; 1	PAR; 3	BER; 7	ZUR; 2	NYC; 9	NYC; 10					3rd	143
2018–19	Envision Virgin Racing	Spark SRT05e	Audi e-tron FE05	ADR; 11	**MRK**; 3	SCL; 1	MEX; 9	HKG; 6	SYX; Ret	RME; 11	PAR; 11	MCO; 16†	BER; 9	BRN; 4	NYC; 8	NYC; 4				9th	85
2019–20	Envision Virgin Racing	Spark SRT05e	Audi e-tron FE06	DIR; 1	DIR; Ret	SCL; 10	MEX; Ret	MRK; 10	BER; 3	BER; 6	BER; 13	BER; 11	BER; 20	BER; 5						10th	63
2020–21	Jaguar Racing	Spark SRT05e	Jaguar I-Type 5	DIR; Ret	DIR; 1	RME; 2	RME; Ret	VLC; DSQ	VLC; 14	MCO; 7	PUE; Ret	PUE; 12	NYC; 9	**NYC**; 1	LDN; Ret	LDN; Ret	BER; Ret	BER; 7		6th	87
2021–22	Jaguar TCS Racing	Spark SRT05e	Jaguar I-Type 5	DRH; 4	DRH; 15	MEX; 15	RME; 5	RME; Ret	MCO; Ret	BER; 7	BER; 11	JAK; 10	MRK; 9	NYC; 7	NYC; 5	LDN; Ret	LDN; 8	SEO	SEO	13th	51
2022–23	Jaguar TCS Racing	Formula E Gen3	Jaguar I-Type 6	MEX; Ret	DRH; 3	DRH; 4	HYD; Ret	CAP; DNS	SAP; 3	BER; 2	BER; 19	MCO; 16	JAK; 21	JAK; DNS	POR; 17	RME; Ret	RME; 3	LDN; 4	LDN; 7	8th	95
2023–24	NEOM McLaren Formula E Team	Formula E Gen3	Nissan e-4ORCE 04	MEX; 14	DRH; 4	DRH; Ret	SAP; 1	TOK; NC	MIS; Ret	MIS; 10	MCO; WD	BER	BER	SIC; 17	SIC; Ret	POR; 7	POR; Ret	LDN; 8	LDN; Ret	13th	48
2024–25	NEOM McLaren Formula E Team	Formula E Gen3 Evo	Nissan e-4ORCE 05	SAO; 4	MEX; 18	JED; 8	JED; 12	MIA; 18	MCO; 11	MCO; 20	TKO; 14	TKO; 8	SHA; 7	SHA; 15	JKT; 8	BER; 11	BER; Ret	LDN; NC	LDN; Ret	18th	31

^{†} Driver did not finish the race, but was classified as he completed over 90% of the race distance.

Sporting positions
Preceded by Sergey Zlobin	FIA Endurance Trophy for LMP2 Drivers; 2015; With: Julien Canal & Roman Rusinov	Succeeded by Gustavo Menezes; Nicolas Lapierre; Stephane Richelmi
Awards
Preceded by Andrew Kirkaldy	Autosport; British Club Driver of the Year; 2006	Succeeded by Duncan Tappy
Preceded by Esteban Gutiérrez	Pirelli Trophy for Tyre Management; Winner; 2013	Succeeded by Incumbent
