= 2011 Yas Marina Circuit GP2 Asia Series round =

Car racing competition

(United Arab Emirates) 2011 Abu Dhabi GP2 round
Round details
- Round 1 of 2 rounds in the 2011 GP2 Series
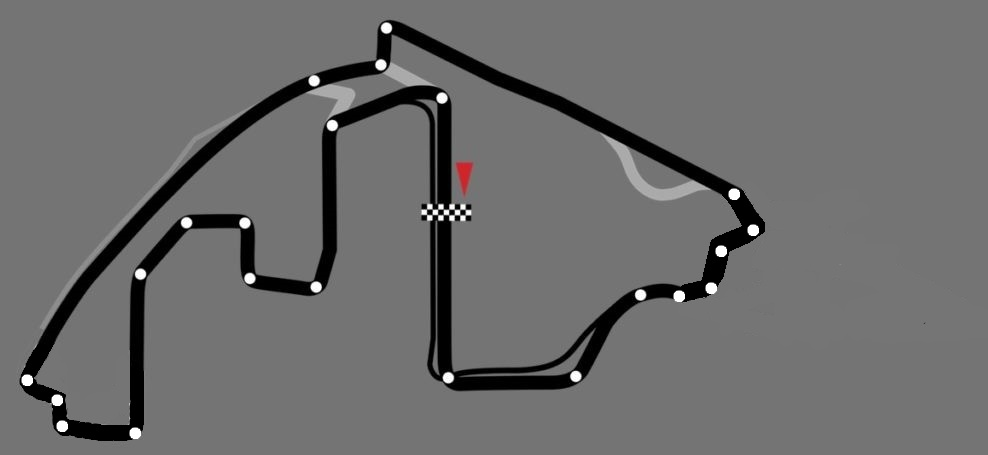
- Yas Marina Circuit
- Location: Yas Marina Circuit, Abu Dhabi, United Arab Emirates
- Course: Permanent racing facility 4.730 km (2.939 mi)

GP2 Series

Feature race
- Date: 11 February 2011
- Laps: 33

Pole position
Driver	(France) Romain Grosjean	DAMS
- Time: 1:36.041

Podium
First	(France) Jules Bianchi	Lotus ART
Second	(France) Romain Grosjean	DAMS
Third	(Italy) Davide Valsecchi	Team Air Asia

Fastest lap
Driver	(France) Jules Bianchi	ART Grand Prix
- Time: 1:38.141 (on lap 31)

Sprint race
- Date: 12 February 2011
- Laps: 26

Podium
First	(Monaco) Stefano Coletti	Trident Racing
Second	(Czech Republic) Josef Král	Arden International
Third	(Sweden) Marcus Ericsson	iSport International

Fastest lap
Driver	(France) Charles Pic (Note: Charles Pic set the fastest lap, but did not finish in the top 10, so was ineligible to be the point-scorer for the fastest lap. Jules Bianchi was the point-scorer instead for setting the fastest lap of those finishing in the top 10.)	Barwa Addax Team
- Time: 1:37.656 (on lap 26)

The 2011 Abu Dhabi GP2 Asia round was the first round of the 2011 GP2 Asia Series season. It was held on 11 and 12 February 2011 at Yas Marina Circuit in Abu Dhabi, United Arab Emirates.

This round saw the competitive début of the new Dallara GP2/11 chassis, which was brought in as a replacement for the first-generation GP2 car, the Dallara GP2/05, which débuted in the inaugural season of the series. It was also the first race for new tyre supplier Pirelli, after Bridgestone bowed out of Formula One and the main series at the end of 2010.

== Classification ==
=== Qualifying ===
Pos	No	Driver	Team	Time	Gap	Grid
1	9	(France) Romain Grosjean	DAMS	1:36.041		1
2	5	(France) Jules Bianchi	Lotus ART	1:36.448	+0.407	2
3	27	(Italy) Davide Valsecchi	Team AirAsia	1:36.501	+0.460	3
4	23	(Spain) Dani Clos	Racing Engineering	1:36.614	+0.573	4
5	17	(Netherlands) Giedo van der Garde	Barwa Addax Team	1:36.658	+0.617	5
6	1	(Sweden) Marcus Ericsson	iSport International	1:36.659	+0.618	6
7	25	(United Kingdom) Max Chilton	Carlin	1:36.693	+0.652	7
8	3	(Czech Republic) Josef Král	Arden International	1:36.724	+0.683	8
9	6	(Mexico) Esteban Gutiérrez	Lotus ART	1:36.741	+0.700	9
10	22	(France) Nathanaël Berthon	Racing Engineering	1:36.825	+0.784	10
11	2	(United Kingdom) Sam Bird	iSport International	1:36.830	+0.789	11
12	11	(Romania) Michael Herck	Scuderia Coloni	1:36.863	+0.822	12
13	15	(United Kingdom) Oliver Turvey	Ocean Racing Technology	1:36.875	+0.834	13
14	16	(France) Charles Pic	Barwa Addax Team	1:36.961	+0.920	14
15	20	(Switzerland) Fabio Leimer	Rapax	1:37.047	+1.006	15
16	8	(Venezuela) Johnny Cecotto Jr.	Super Nova Racing	1:37.129	+1.088	16
17	21	(Italy) Julián Leal	Rapax	1:37.145	+1.104	17
18	4	(United Kingdom) Jolyon Palmer	Arden International	1:37.305	+1.264	18
19	18	(Monaco) Stefano Coletti	Trident Racing	1:37.329	+1.288	19
20	14	(Italy) Andrea Caldarelli	Ocean Racing Technology	1:37.345	+1.304	20
21	26	(Brazil) Luiz Razia	Team AirAsia	1:37.426	+1.385	21
22	27	(Russia) Mikhail Aleshin	Carlin	1:37.535	+1.494	24^{1}
23	7	(Malaysia) Fairuz Fauzy	Super Nova Racing	1:37.572	+1.531	26^{2}
24	10	(Norway) Pål Varhaug	DAMS	1:37.632	+1.591	22
25	19	(Venezuela) Rodolfo González	Trident Racing	1:37.669	+1.628	23
26	12	(United Kingdom) James Jakes	Scuderia Coloni	1:37.741	+1.700	25

Notes

- ^1 – Mikhail Aleshin was handed a three grid position penalty for crossing the finish line more than once at the end of the session.
- ^2 – Fairuz Fauzy was handed a ten grid position penalty for causing a collision.

=== Feature race ===
Pos	No	Driver	Team	Laps	Time/Retired	Grid	Points
1	5	(France) Jules Bianchi	Lotus ART	33	1:22:04.643	2	10+1
2	9	(France) Romain Grosjean	DAMS	33	+6.681	1	8+2
3	27	(Italy) Davide Valsecchi	Team AirAsia	33	+12.794	3	6
4	1	(Sweden) Marcus Ericsson	iSport International	33	+14.001	6	5
5	17	(Netherlands) Giedo van der Garde	Barwa Addax Team	33	+15.198	5	4
6	3	(Czech Republic) Josef Král	Arden International	33	+20.601	8	3
7	2	(United Kingdom) Sam Bird	iSport International	33	+24.412	11	2
8	18	(Monaco) Stefano Coletti	Trident Racing	33	+36.809	19	1
9	16	(France) Charles Pic	Barwa Addax Team	33	+37.411	14	
10	20	(Switzerland) Fabio Leimer	Rapax	33	+40.252	15	
11	19	(Venezuela) Rodolfo González	Trident Racing	33	+48.587	23	
12	25	(United Kingdom) Max Chilton	Carlin	33	+51.866^{3}	7	
13	11	(Romania) Michael Herck	Scuderia Coloni	33	+59.963	12	
14	4	(United Kingdom) Jolyon Palmer	Arden International	33	+1:07.206	18	
15	8	(Venezuela) Johnny Cecotto Jr.	Super Nova Racing	33	+1:08.136	16	
16	14	(Italy) Andrea Caldarelli	Ocean Racing Technology	33	+1:37.978	20	
17	12	(United Kingdom) James Jakes	Scuderia Coloni	32	DNF	25	
18	15	(United Kingdom) Oliver Turvey	Ocean Racing Technology	32	+1 Lap	13	
Ret	22	(France) Nathanaël Berthon	Racing Engineering	24	DNF	10	
Ret	21	(Italy) Julián Leal	Rapax	19	DNF	17	
Ret	7	(Malaysia) Fairuz Fauzy	Super Nova Racing	19	DNF	26	
Ret	6	(Mexico) Esteban Gutiérrez	Lotus ART	18	DNF	9	
Ret	27	(Russia) Mikhail Aleshin	Carlin	10	DNF	24	
Ret	23	(Spain) Dani Clos	Racing Engineering	0	DNF	4	
Ret	26	(Brazil) Luiz Razia	Team AirAsia	0	DNF	21	
Ret	10	(Norway) Pål Varhaug	DAMS	0	DNF	22	
Fastest lap: Jules Bianchi (ART Grand Prix) 1:38.141 (lap 31)

Notes

- ^3 – Max Chilton was penalised 20 seconds for failing to respect the track limits.

=== Sprint race ===
Pos	No	Driver	Team	Laps	Time/Retired	Grid	Points
1	18	(Monaco) Stefano Coletti	Trident Racing	26	43:02.819	1	6
2	3	(Czech Republic) Josef Král	Arden International	26	+2.629	3	5
3	1	(Sweden) Marcus Ericsson	iSport International	26	+3.323	5	4
4	27	(Italy) Davide Valsecchi	Team AirAsia	26	+11.531	6	3
5	11	(Romania) Michael Herck	Scuderia Coloni	26	+14.687	13	2
6	20	(Switzerland) Fabio Leimer	Rapax	26	+17.175	10	1
7	8	(Venezuela) Johnny Cecotto Jr.	Super Nova Racing	26	+25.351	15	
8	5	(France) Jules Bianchi	Lotus ART	26	+29.434^{4}	8	1
9	19	(Venezuela) Rodolfo González	Trident Racing	26	+30.947	11	
10	4	(United Kingdom) Jolyon Palmer	Arden International	26	+32.897	14	
11	14	(Italy) Andrea Caldarelli	Ocean Racing Technology	26	+33.396	16	
12	6	(Mexico) Esteban Gutiérrez	Lotus ART	26	+33.643	22	
13	12	(United Kingdom) James Jakes	Scuderia Coloni	26	+34.526	17	
14	22	(France) Nathanaël Berthon	Racing Engineering	26	+37.426^{4}	19	
15	7	(Malaysia) Fairuz Fauzy	Super Nova Racing	26	+38.094	21	
16	26	(Brazil) Luiz Razia	Team AirAsia	26	+38.830	25	
17	21	(Italy) Julián Leal	Rapax	26	+39.280	20	
18	25	(United Kingdom) Max Chilton	Carlin	26	+42.205	12	
19	15	(United Kingdom) Oliver Turvey	Ocean Racing Technology	26	+42.677	18	
20	10	(Norway) Pål Varhaug	DAMS	26	+43.137	26	
21	16	(France) Charles Pic	Barwa Addax Team	26	+45.493^{4}	9	
22	23	(Spain) Dani Clos	Racing Engineering	26	+47.035	24	
23	17	(Netherlands) Giedo van der Garde	Barwa Addax Team	26	+49.926	4	
24	27	(Russia) Mikhail Aleshin	Carlin	23	DNF	23	
Ret	2	(United Kingdom) Sam Bird	iSport International	21	DNF	2	
Ret	9	(France) Romain Grosjean	DAMS	0	DNF	7	
Fastest lap: Charles Pic (Barwa Addax Team) 1:37:656 (lap 26)

Notes

- ^4 – Jules Bianchi, Charles Pic and Nathanaël Berthon were penalised 20 seconds for not respecting yellow flags.

== Standings after the race ==
Drivers' Championship standings

Pos	Driver	Points
1	(France) Jules Bianchi	12
2	(France) Romain Grosjean	10
3	(Sweden) Marcus Ericsson	9
4	(Italy) Davide Valsecchi	9
5	(Czech Republic) Josef Král	8

Teams' Championship standings

Pos	Team	Points
1	(France) Lotus ART	12
2	(United Kingdom) iSport International	11
3	(France) DAMS	10
4	(Malaysia) Team AirAsia	9
5	(United Kingdom) Arden International	8

- Note: Only the top five positions are included for both sets of standings.

== See also ==
- 2011 Yas V8 400

== Notes ==
Previous round: 2010 Bahrain 2nd GP2 Asia round	GP2 Asia Series Championship; 2011 season	Next round: 2011 Imola GP2 Asia round
Previous round: 2010 Yas Marina GP2 Series round	Abu Dhabi GP2 Asia round	Next round: 2011 GP2 Final
