= Andretti =

Andretti may refer to:

== Andretti family ==
- The Andretti family of American racing drivers
  - Aldo Andretti (1940–2020), twin brother of Mario
  - Mario Andretti (born 1940), Italian-born American racing driver
  - Michael Andretti (born 1962), son of Mario
  - John Andretti (1963–2020), son of Aldo
  - Jeff Andretti (born 1964), son of Mario
  - Adam Andretti (born 1979), son of Aldo
  - Marco Andretti (born 1987), son of Michael
  - Jarett Andretti (born 1992), son of John
- Andretti Global, an auto racing team, of which Michael Andretti was an owner
  - Walkinshaw Andretti United, an Australian motor racing team, of which Michael Andretti was a shareholder
- Andretti curse, a folk belief in a string of bad luck of the Andretti racing family
- Andretti Racing, a video game
- Michael Andretti's World GP, a 1990 video game also called Satoru Nakajima F-1 Hero
- Michael Andretti's Indy Car Challenge, a 1994 video game

== Other people ==
- Andretti Bain (born 1985), Bahamian sprinter
- Action Andretti, stage name of Tyler Reber (born 1998), American professional wrestler

== See also ==
- The dictionary definition of Mario Andretti at Wiktionary
