= Mohamed El Hayani =

Moroccan singer and actor

Mohamed El Hayani محمد الحياني

Background information
- Born: 1945; Casablanca, French protectorate in Morocco
- Origin: Morocco
- Died: 23 October 1996 (aged 51) Rabat, Morocco
- Genres: Moroccan music, Opera
- Occupations: Singer, actor, musician
- Instrument: Oud
- Years active: 1963–1996
- Label: Polydor Records
- Website: www.mohamedelhayani.com

Mohamed El Hayani (Arabic: محمد الحياني) (1945–1996) was a Moroccan singer, actor and musician (vocalist) specialized in the so-called Moroccan modern music.

== Early life ==
El Hayani was born in Casablanca, Morocco in 1945. He spent his childhood in the neighborhood of Derb Sultan before moving to Agdal in Rabat, where he lived with his older sister Fatna, who was his first supporter. She was the one who helped him enroll at the National Conservatory of Music as soon as he discovered his passion for singing, a passion that emerged from his earliest childhood, leading him to abandon his studies at the primary level. At the Conservatory, El Hayyani was taught by experienced artists such as the composer Abdelkader Rachdi, who was very impressed by his voice.

in the late 1960, El Hayani recorded his first song "Ya Oulidi" (my little son), before bewitching audiences through "Rahila" (female traveler), a mythic song composed by the late Abdessalam Amer and still as strongly present in Moroccan repertoire of music.

In 1982, El Hayani entered the cinema world starring alongside Hammadi Ammour and Habiba Medkouri in "Doumou3 Nadam" (tears of regret) directed by Hassan El Moufti. The film seduced a large audience.

El Hayani died October 23, 1996, at the age of 51. He left the Moroccan modern music scene as one of its pioneers.

== Discography ==
During his career, Mohamed El Hayani recorded several songs notable in Morocco, including:

- Ya Sidi Ana 7or – يا سيدي أنا حر (Sir I am Free)
- Bard u skhun – بارد وسخون (Cold and Hot)
- Qtach Tghanni Ya qalbi – وقتاش تغني أ قلبي (When will you sing, my heart?)
- Ya Oulidi – يا وليدي (my little son)
