= 2019 Marrakesh ePrix =

Race 2 of 13 of the 2018–19 Formula E Championship
← Previous race	Next race →

Race details
- Date: 12 January 2019
- Official name: 2019 Marrakesh E-Prix
- Location: Circuit International Automobile Moulay El Hassan, Agdal, Marrakesh
- Course: Street Circuit
- Course length: 2.971 kilometres (1.846 mi)
- Distance: 31 laps, 92.101 km (57.229 mi)
- Weather: Sunny

Pole position
Driver	(United Kingdom) Sam Bird	Envision Virgin Racing
- Time: 1:17.851

Fastest lap
Driver	(Brazil) Lucas di Grassi	Audi
- Time: 1:20.296 on lap 31

Podium
First	(Belgium) Jérôme d'Ambrosio	Mahindra Racing
Second	(Netherlands) Robin Frijns	Envision Virgin Racing
Third	(United Kingdom) Sam Bird	Envision Virgin Racing

The 2019 Marrakesh ePrix (formally the 2019 Marrakesh E-Prix) was a Formula E electric car race held at the Circuit International Automobile Moulay El Hassan in the Agdal district of Marrakesh, Morocco on 12 January 2019. It was the second round of the 2018–19 Formula E Championship and the third Marrakesh ePrix. Jérôme d'Ambrosio of Mahindra won the 31-lap race after starting from tenth place. Second place went to Virgin's Robin Frijns and his teammate Sam Bird was third.

Bird won the pole position by setting the fastest lap in qualifying and held the lead despite Techeetah's Jean-Éric Vergne clattering into his left-hand sidepod and spinning 180 degrees on the race's opening lap. António Félix da Costa of BMW Andretti passed Bird to move into first place on lap ten and pulled away to lead the following fourteen laps until a collision on lap 26 with his teammate Alexander Sims careened him into a barrier. That promoted d'Ambrosio into the lead, which he maintained through a safety car period; he held off Frijns on the final lap to win by 0.143 seconds. It was d'Ambrosio's third career victory and his first without having inherited the win through driver disqualifications.

D'Ambrosio's victory put him in the lead of the Drivers' Championship with 40 points. Félix da Costa fell to second and Vergne, who recovered to finish fifth in the race, dropped to third. Vergne's teammate André Lotterer moved up a place to fourth and Frijns moved from twelfth to fifth. In the Teams' Championship, Techeetah led with 47 points, Mahindra and BMW were tied for second as Virgin progressed to fourth with eleven races left in the season.

== Background ==
The Marrakesh ePrix was confirmed as part of the 2018–19 Formula E Championship by the FIA World Motor Sport Council in October 2018. It was the second of thirteen scheduled single-seater electric car races of the 2018–19 Championship, and third annual edition of the event. The ePrix was held at the 2.97 km (1.85 mi) anti-clockwise 12-turn semi-permanent Circuit International Automobile Moulay El Hassan street circuit in the Agdal district of the Moroccan city of Marrakesh on 12 January. The track's configuration requires teams to develop their spring rates, anti-roll bar, car ride height and vehicle chassis configuration for maximum mechanical grip. The circuit was unchanged from the 2018 race with the mandatory attack-mode activation zone to provide drivers with extra power for a certain amount of time situated on the outside of turn three and the timing loops to activate the system were made visible to drivers. The driver adviser to the stewards was former Trulli GP driver Vitantonio Liuzzi.

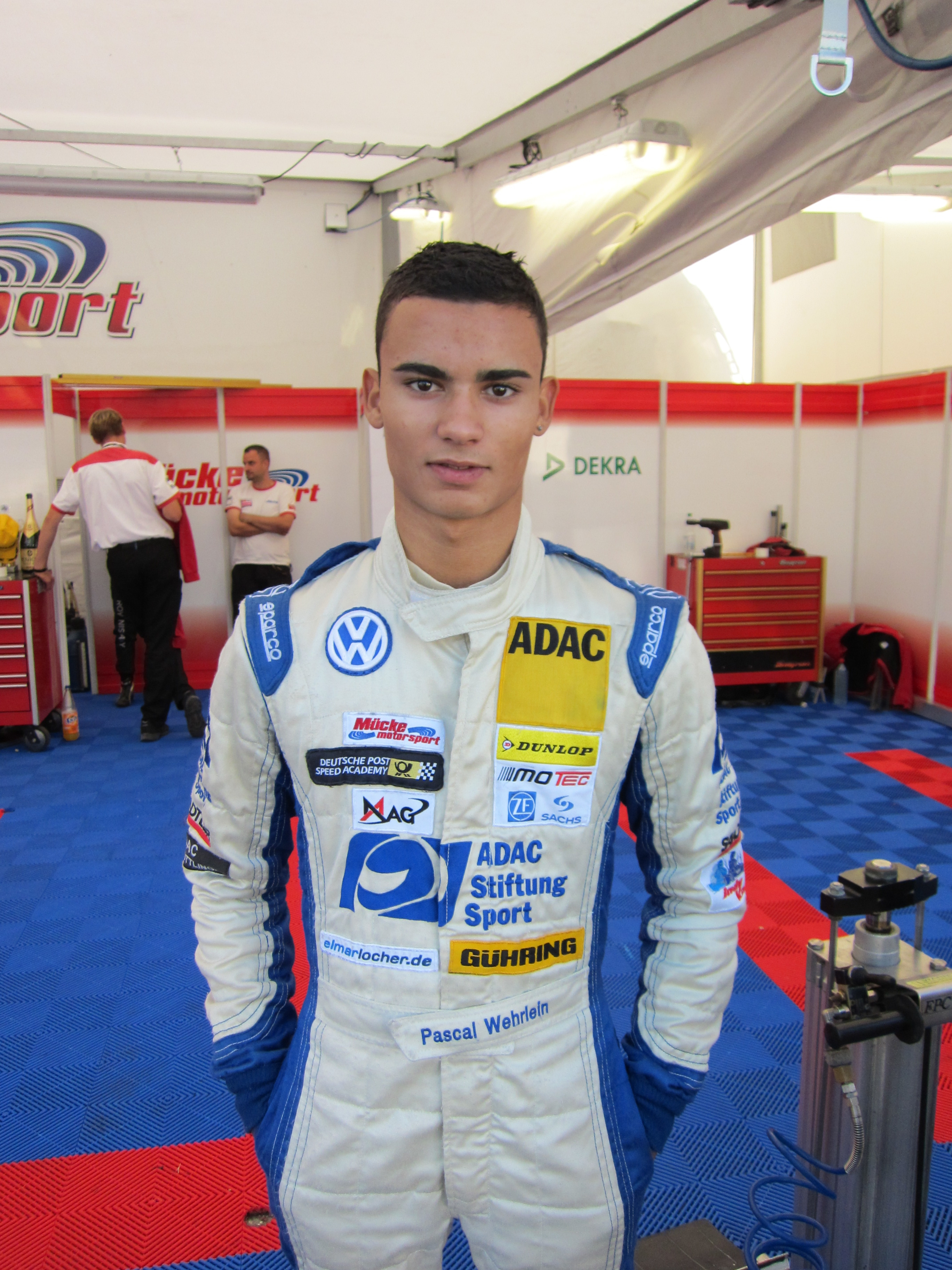
Pascal Wehrlein (pictured in 2011) made his Formula E debut for Mahindra.

After winning the season-opening Ad Diriyah ePrix four weeks earlier, BMW Andretti driver António Félix da Costa led the Drivers' Championship with 28 points, ahead of Jean-Éric Vergne of Techeetah with 18 points, and Mahindra's Jérôme d'Ambrosio with 15 points. With 12 points, Mitch Evans for Jaguar was in fourth place and Vergne's teammate André Lotterer was fifth with 10 points. In the Teams' Championship, Techeetah led with 29 points; BMW Andretti were a further point behind in second. Mahindra, Jaguar and e.Dams-Nissan in positions three through five were each separated by a single point. The race saw the introduction of a mandated winglet on the roll hoop of all cars, next to the television camera. The addition came after some teams lobbied the series to free up space on the hoop's side for commercial partners.

Following a software-related drive-through penalty that lost him a potential victory in Ad Diriyah, Vergne said he was eager to demonstrate his team had the fastest car in Marrakesh, "Being so close to the victory in the first round has left me very hungry for more, and it’s what my focus is all about right now, Marrakesh hasn’t been a good track for us in the past so I’m hoping that we can change that and leave Morocco on a high note this year. It still [sic] a very long way to go and we know that we need to continue to be razor sharp for the rest of the season." D'Ambrosio stated that he thought he could achieve another podium finish in Marrakesh, and aimed to continue improving his performance and maintain Mahindra's strong record at the track: "It’s a challenging street circuit and, while it hasn’t been the best track for me over the past two years, I’m going to make sure that I change that and I’m looking forward to having a good race this weekend."

The second in-season rookie test was scheduled to be held at the circuit the day after the race. Teams were required to field two drivers who were not in possession of an e-licence at the time of the test. There were eleven teams entering two drivers each for the race with a total of 22 competitors. There was one driver change going into the race. Having missed the Ad Diriyah ePrix because his Mercedes-Benz contract barred him from driving with another team until 31 December 2018 without performing certain pre-requisites, 2015 Deutsche Tourenwagen Masters champion Pascal Wehrlein replaced the outgoing Felix Rosenqvist at Mahindra; Rosenqvist moved to Chip Ganassi Racing's IndyCar Series team for 2019. Wehrlein spent the week before the race at Mahindra's simulator in Banbury as part of his preparation.

== Practice ==
Two practice sessions—both on Saturday morning—were held before the late-afternoon race. The first session ran for 45 minutes and the second for half an hour. The first practice session was first held in darkness and cold weather with drivers struggling to get tyre temperature before the sun rose. Robin Frijns of Virgin was fastest with a lap of 1 minute and 17.808 seconds, followed by Félix da Costa, Bird, e.Dams-Nissan's Oliver Rowland, Oliver Turvey for NIO, the Jaguar duo of Evans and Nelson Piquet Jr., Alexander Sims of BMW Andretti, Sebastien Buemi for Nissan and Vergne. During the session, where drivers locked their tyres due to them fine-tuning their brake-by-wire systems, several competitors ran onto the turn seven run-off area because they braked later than usual. Evans avoided contact with a trackside barrier, and his teammate Piquet swerved to avoid hitting Venturi's Felipe Massa who made a late decision to enter the pit lane. With 13 minutes remaining, Wehrlein's car briefly switched off at turn ten and the session was red flagged as he reset his car to allow his return to the pit lane.

The second practice session was held in warmer weather. Evans led with an early benchmark lap which Frijns improved in the final ten minutes. Lotterer then bettered Frijns' lap before Evans ran with 250 kW (340 hp) of power to set a 1-minute and 17.762 seconds lap to go fastest, 0.242 seconds ahead of Lotterer. Buemi, Félix da Costa, Frijns, Rowland, José María López for Dragon, Turvey, Vergne, and Sims completed the top ten ahead of qualifying. As the session passed relatively peacefully, drivers again locked their brakes into turn seven. As Massa activated 250 kW (340 hp) mode, his car shut down on the start/finish straight; he restarted it with radio engineer assistance. Massa's powertrain was later replaced and Lucas di Grassi's Audi had a water pump change.

== Qualifying ==
Saturday's 75-minute afternoon qualifying session was divided into two groups of five cars and two groups of six. Each group was determined by a lottery system and given six minutes of on-track activity. All drivers were limited to two timed laps with one at maximum power. The fastest six overall competitors in the four groups participated in a "Super Pole" session with one driver on the track at any time going out in reverse order from fifth to first. Each of the five drivers was limited to one timed lap and the starting order was determined by their fastest times; positions six through twenty were determined by group qualifying times. The driver and team who recorded the fastest time were awarded three points towards their respective championships.

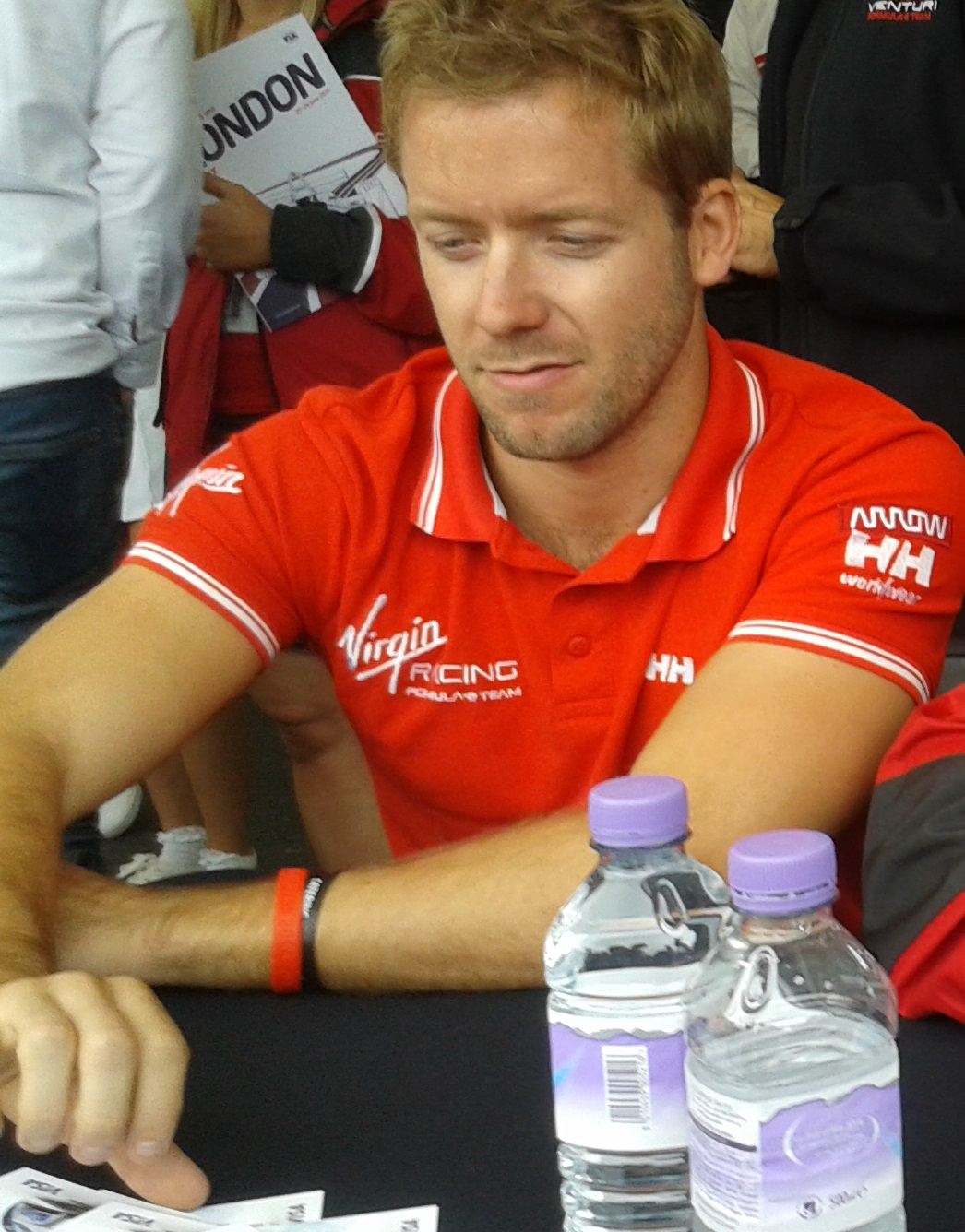
Sam Bird (pictured in 2015) took the fifth pole position of his career notwithstanding rear diffuser damage from a three-car accident in the pit lane.

In the first session to have a direct comparison between the two cars—the preceding Ad Diriyah race was rain-affected—the SRT05e was three seconds a lap faster than the Spark-Renault SRT 01E. In group one, Félix da Costa was fastest, ahead of Vergne, Evans, d'Ambrosio and Lotterer after a driver error at turn seven. Buemi led the second session with Piquet second. Di Grassi had an untidy lap and was third in the group, followed by Rowland. Abt was group two's slowest driver by losing a large amount of time midway on the track. In the third group, Bird set the fastest overall kap in group qualifying at 1 minute and 17.851 seconds despite a minor error in the first turn. His teammate Frijns was second and provisionally sixth overall. The NIO pair of Turvey and Dillmann were third and fourth. Dragon's Maximilian Günther was fifth after hitting a bump on a kerb on the exit to turn six, going airborne briefly, and crashing into the side of a barrier. Stoffel Vandoorne's HWA car shut down halfway through his maximum power lap as he looked set to enter the top ten.

After group three ended, Dillmann's car had a sudden brake failure en route to parc fermé in the pit lane and he had to decide whether to hit the rear of Frijns' car or a track marshal. He elected to hit Frijns, which caused a chain reaction incident that sent him into the rear of his teammate Bird's car. Bird sustained rear diffuser damage; parc fermé regulations dictated any repairs made to his car would send him to the rear of the grid. In group four, Sims was fastest and he advanced to Super Pole. He demoted Wehrlein to seventh overall after the latter ran over the kerbs at the final corner. López was third; the Venturi duo of Massa and Edoardo Mortara took fourth and fifth. HWA's Gary Paffett was slowest in group four because of a heavy understeer in turn one and electrical energy issues. After group qualifying, Buemi, Sims, Félix da Costa, Vergne and Evans progressed to Super Pole. Bird took the fifth pole position of his career and his first since the second 2017 New York City ePrix race with a 1-minute and 17.489 seconds lap. He was joined on the grid's front row by Vergne who recorded a mistake-free lap. Félix da Costa had an untidy lap and came third. Buemi in fourth was smooth and Sims took fifth. Sixth-place Evans locked his front tyres on the approach to turn seven and ran deep onto the run off-area.

=== Post-qualifying ===
After qualifying, Félix da Costa was demoted three places on the starting grid because he was adjudged to have exceeded the maximum amount of permitted electrical power on his non-timed lap at 204.92 kW (274.80 hp) because of a temporary spike. Hence, the grid lined up after penalties as Bird, Vergne, Buemi, Sims, Evans, Félix da Costa, Wehrlein, Frijns, Piquet, d'Ambrosio, di Grassi, Rowland, López, Turvey, Massa, Abt, Mortara, Dillmann, Paffett, Lotterer, Günther and Vandoorne.

=== Qualifying classification ===
Final qualifying classification
Pos.	No.	Driver	Team	GS	SP	Grid
1	2	(United Kingdom) Sam Bird	Virgin-Audi	1:17.851	1:17.489	1
2	25	(France) Jean-Éric Vergne	Techeetah-DS	1:18.042	1:17.535	2
3	28	(Portugal) António Félix da Costa	Andretti-BMW	1:17.950	1:17.626	6^{1}
4	23	(Switzerland) Sébastien Buemi	e.Dams-Nissan	1:17.906	1:17.738	3
5	27	(United Kingdom) Alexander Sims	Andretti-BMW	1:17.935	1:18.400	4
6	20	(New Zealand) Mitch Evans	Jaguar	1:18.106	1:29.379	5
7	94	(Germany) Pascal Wehrlein	Mahindra	1:18.126	—N/a	7
8	4	(Netherlands) Robin Frijns	Virgin-Audi	1:18.200	—N/a	8
9	3	(Brazil) Nelson Piquet Jr.	Jaguar	1:18.347	—N/a	9
10	64	(Belgium) Jérôme d'Ambrosio	Mahindra	1:18.440	—N/a	10
11	11	(Brazil) Lucas di Grassi	Audi	1:18.595	—N/a	11
12	22	(United Kingdom) Oliver Rowland	e.Dams-Nissan	1:18.604	—N/a	12
13	7	(Argentina) José María López	Dragon-Penske	1:18.612	—N/a	13
14	16	(United Kingdom) Oliver Turvey	NIO	1:18.624	—N/a	14
15	19	(Brazil) Felipe Massa	Venturi	1:18.780	—N/a	15
16	66	(Germany) Daniel Abt	Audi	1:18.921	—N/a	16
17	48	(Switzerland) Edoardo Mortara	Venturi	1:19.133	—N/a	17
18	8	(France) Tom Dillmann	NIO	1:19.338	—N/a	18
19	17	(United Kingdom) Gary Paffett	HWA-Venturi	1:19.516	—N/a	19
20	36	(Germany) André Lotterer	Techeetah-DS	1:19.633	—N/a	20
21	6	(Germany) Maximilian Günther	Dragon-Penske	1:23.332	—N/a	21
22	5	(Belgium) Stoffel Vandoorne	HWA-Venturi	1:33.404	—N/a	22

Notes

- ^1 — António Félix da Costa was demoted three places for exceeding the amount of permitted power on his non-timed lap.

== Race ==
The race, which lasted 45 minutes plus one full lap after time had elapsed, began at 16:03 Central European Time (UTC+01:00). The weather at the start was hot and clear and the air temperature ranged from 20.25 to 20.95 °C (68.45 to 69.71 °F) and the track temperature was between 18.3 and 20 °C (64.9 and 68.0 °F); a 20-per-cent chance of rain was forecast. Each driver was required to use attack mode twice and was permitted to arm the system no more than five times. A special feature of Formula E is the "Fan Boost" feature, an additional 25 kW (34 hp) of power to use during the race's second half. The five drivers who were allowed to use the boost were determined by a fan vote. For the Marrakesh race, Vandoorne, Félix da Costa, Massa, Buemi, Wehrlein were handed the extra power. Bird made a good getaway and Buemi drew alongside the fractionally slower Vergne entering the first corner. As he turned to the inside line to block Vergne, it appeared Bird would lead comfortably. Vergne went onto the inside run-off area and clattered into Bird's left-hand sidepod on the turn-one apex at high speed. That caused a small titanium television camera from Vergne's car to detach and lodge itself in the aperture of Bird's left-hand sidepod. Vergne spun 180 degrees, and several drivers swerved to avoid his car.

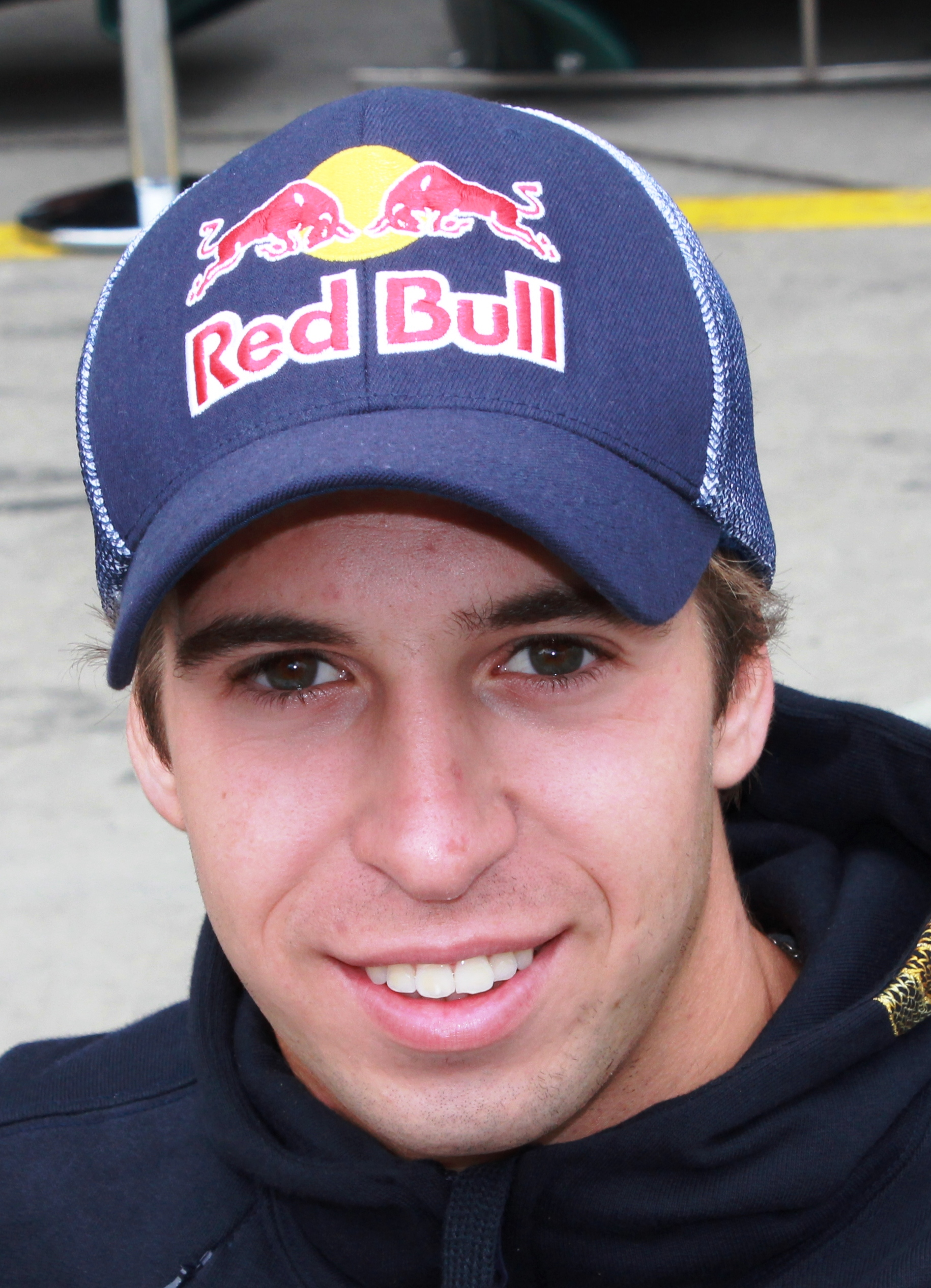
António Félix da Costa (pictured in 2012) led for 15 laps until he and his teammate Alexander Sims made contact on the 26th lap, which he took responsibility for.

Wehrlein's suspension, diffuser, rear tyre bearing and rims were damaged when di Grassi misjudged his braking point for the first turn and rammed into him. An attempt to continue driving proved impossible and he entered the pit lane to retire. Additionally, Paffett and his HWA teammate Vandoorne were unsighted because of smoke emitted from Vergne's spin, and the two made contact with each other's sidepods in the same area, causing Vandoorne to retire with a broken suspension at the end of the first lap and Paffett to sustain a slow rear-left puncture. Turvey moved from 16th to seventh by the end of the first lap while Vergne's spin dropped him to 19th and Buemi fell to 14th. At the start of lap two, Buemi passed Evans on the inside into turn one for 13th. Lotterer passed Evans soon after and then overtook Buemi into the turn-five and six chicane. On the third lap, a brief yellow flag was waved as Paffett spun exiting the chicane as the slow puncture deteriorated, causing him to retire. Félix da Costa passed his teammate Sims on the inside line at turn three for the second position on the following lap. On lap seven, Günther activated the attack mode, passing Dillmann, Vergne and Massa over the next four laps.

Gunther's act confirmed to the field that the attack mode was a huge advantage without losing a large amount of time during activation, and a steady trickle of drivers activated the system over the following few laps. On lap ten, López overtook Turvey on the inside for seventh before turn one. That lap, Félix da Costa attempted to pass Bird for the lead on the inside into turn eleven, which Bird blocked and Félix da Costa's right-rear corner hit Bird's left-rear quarter; both continued without any car damage. Félix da Costa tried again going into the turn-four and five chicane on lap 11, and moved past Bird on the inside as the latter cut the corner under braking. Sims got an advantage to overtake Bird and took second on the straight entering turn eight. Abt used the attack mode to pass López on the entry to turn one on lap 12 but López responded by doing the same two laps later. On lap 14, d'Ambrosio went to the inside to pass di Grassi into turn seven for fifth. That prompted Virgin to allow Frijns to take third from his teammate Bird entering turn seven on lap 15. Bird blocked d'Ambrosio from overtaking him for fourth on the outside into turn eleven.

On lap 16, di Grassi activated the attack mode, as d'Ambrosio successfully overtook Bird to move into fourth going into turn eleven, before the latter lost fifth to di Grassi on the start/finish straight. During the 17th lap, d'Ambrosio and d'Grassi got ahead of Frijns at turns seven and on the straight linking turns 10 and 11 to demote him to fifth. Di Grassi began to pressure d'Ambrosio as Bird activated the attack mode, falling to seventh behind López on the next lap. Bird however immediately retook sixth from López entering the turn four and five chicane. As the pack began to close up to the BMWs, Félix da Costa and Sims activated their first attack modes on the 19th lap in an attempt to increase their lead. Frijns and Bird used their second attack mode activation on lap 23, with the two passing di Grassi at the end of the lap, motivated by Vergne moving to sixth. Furthermore, as he caught the battle for third, they were gaining on the BMWs, resulting in a lead change with ten minutes left.

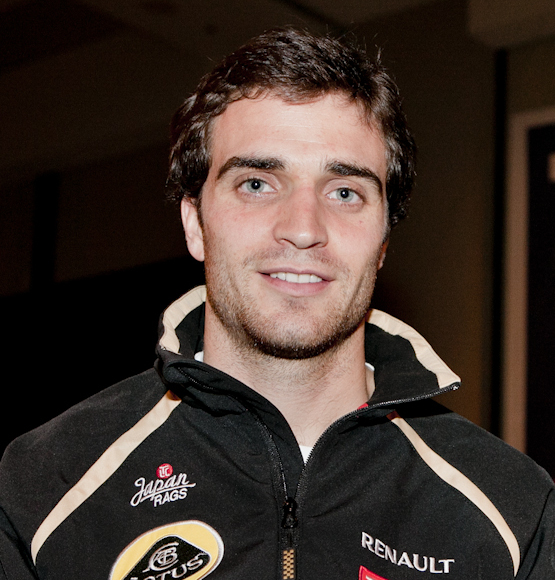
Jerome d'Ambrosio (pictured in 2011) took the third victory of his career and his first on the track after his previous wins came as a result of driver disqualifications.

Around this time, BMW Andretti team principal Roger Griffiths liaised with its senior engineering team to consider allowing Sims to pass his teammate Félix da Costa for the lead because he was the faster driver and had better electrical energy management. Despite his team's liaison, Sims, approaching turn seven on the 26th lap, challenged his teammate Félix da Costa for first on the outside as both drivers locked their brakes. This caused Félix da Costa to slide wide and hit the front-left quarter of Sims's car, who had regained control; he could not avoid the former and their front wings interlocked. Félix da Costa careened into a right-side tyre wall and retired. Sims made it through the corner, but fell from second to fourth. D'Ambrosio moved into first with Frijns second. To recover Félix da Costa's car, the race director Scot Elkins ordered the safety car's deployment with seven minutes remaining. The safety car stayed on the track until only 20 seconds were left to run and Sims used their second attack modes beforehand to challenge Bird for third place.

On the final lap, d'Ambrosio locked his tyres at the final corner and held off Frijns to win the race. It was d'Ambrosio's third career victory, his first since the 2016 Mexico City ePrix, and his first on-track win; his previous two came via technical disqualifications involving di Grassi. Frijns was 0.147 seconds behind in second and took the best finish of his career at the time, besting prior third-place finish in the 2015 Putrajaya ePrix. His teammate Bird finished third. Off the podium, Sims took fourth, Vergne completed his recovery to finish fifth and his teammate Lotterer sixth. Di Grassi finished seventh and earned one extra point for setting the race's fastest lap on the final lap, at 1-minute and 20.296 seconds. Buemi, Evans, and Abt rounded out the top ten. The final finishers were López, Günther, Mortara, Piquet, Rowland, Turvey, Dillmann and Massa.

=== Post-race ===
The top three drivers appeared on the podium to collect their trophies and spoke to the media in a later press conference. D'Ambrosio was euphoric over taking his third career victory, "This is a real win, I fought hard for it and I'm really happy. I've been here since the start [of the series] and I've been fighting to be in this position. Last year we had some tough moments and I'm happy I can pay the team back like this." Frijns said he regretted not challenging d'Ambrosio harder on the final lap. He commented on the importance of his second-place finish for the Virgin team, "At one point, I was like, 'Shall I go for it at Turn 10?' and then I was like, 'Yeah, but we are P2, [team-mate] Sam [Bird] is P3 and I'm not going to be a bully that drives over Jerome and doesn't finish at all'. I think it's smart to not do it at the beginning of the season - just to score the points." Third-placed Bird said the camera from Vergne's car lodged in his vehicle possibly affected its handling, "I didn’t know too much about the move from Vergne at the start and from there on I suspect it may have caused a slight issue with the car as we didn’t have the pace we had seen earlier. Nevertheless, it was an amazing result for the team and we did a great job in qualifying."

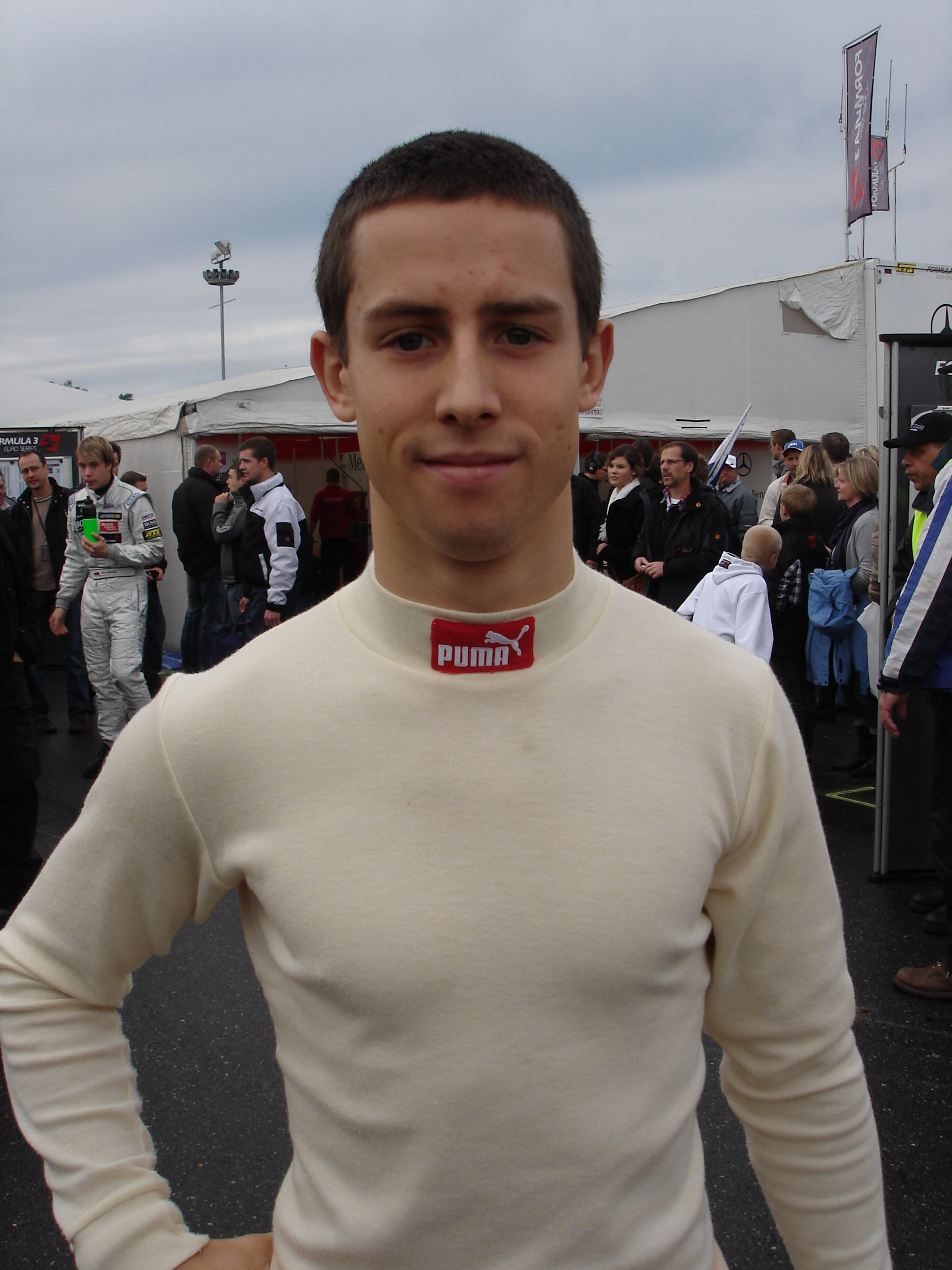
Alexander Sims (pictured in 2009) attributed the clash with his teammate António Félix da Costa to an inter-team communication breakdown.

BMW Andretti personnel convened immediately after the race to discuss the collision with Félix da Costa and Sims. Félix da Costa apologised to the team, expressed contrition to the press, and conceded Sims was faster than him: "I'm sorry - that's a mistake and a mistake coming from me only. [It's] terribly frustrating in this story because we lost a win, we lost a one-two, and even if it was just me, Alex could have won the race. But because of that, I denied him the win, denied the team a one-two. I'm feeling very bad for myself." Sims attributed the contact to an intra-team communication breakdown and refused to apportion blame. He additionally stated to the media he did not wish to challenge Félix da Costa because he was conserving electrical energy and was attempting to maintain the gap over the rest of the field. Jens Marquardt, director of BMW Motorsport, said that any similar incidents would not re-occur in the future and the team would learn over the rest of the season. Griffiths later emphasised a priority scenario was non-existent over favouring one driver over the other and praised Félix da Costa for accepting responsibility for the accident.

Vergne called himself an "idiot" for clattering into Bird on the first lap, and stated any similar mistakes would not re-occur in the future: "I didn't stop the car and I obviously didn't want to crash into Sam, I didn't want to ruin his race, ruin my race and have a penalty for the next race. So I went completely on the inside and obviously I spun because there was no other way. I either spin or take us both out - so I chose that option. It was unnecessary because I clearly had the pace to win today." Wehrlein said he was certain he could have finished on the podium had di Grassi not hit him at the start; he enjoyed the weekend as a whole, "You know, I got to experience Formula E, apart from the race, but I like the formula and again the race was very interesting. It’s a busy day with a lot of driving so I really like that as well but it starts early, I don’t like it so much but you cannot have everything!"

After the race, d'Ambrosio on 40 points took the Drivers' Championship lead from Félix da Costa, who now tied with Vergne for second with 28. Lotterer moved to fourth place with 19 points and Frijns moved from twelfth to fifth. In the Teams' Championship, Techeetah continued to lead with 47 points; Mahindra moved from third to second, displacing BMW Andretti, which tied Mahindra with 40 points. Virgin's results progressed the team to fourth while e.Dams-Nissan fell to fifth with eleven races left in the season.

=== Race classification ===
Drivers who scored championship points are denoted in bold.

Final race classification
Pos.	No.	Driver	Team	Laps	Time/Retired	Grid	Points
1	**64**	**(Belgium) Jérôme d'Ambrosio**	**Mahindra**	**31**	**46:45.884**	**10**	25
2	**4**	**(Netherlands) Robin Frijns**	**Virgin-Audi**	**31**	**+0.143**	**8**	18
3	**2**	**(United Kingdom) Sam Bird**	**Virgin-Audi**	**31**	**+0.461**	**1**	15+3^{2}
4	**27**	**(United Kingdom) Alexander Sims**	**Andretti-BMW**	**31**	**+0.740**	**4**	12
5	**25**	**(France) Jean-Éric Vergne**	**Techeetah-Citroën**	**31**	**+1.232**	**2**	10
6	**36**	**(Germany) André Lotterer**	**Techeetah-Citroën**	**31**	**+1.457**	**20**	8
7	**11**	**(Brazil) Lucas di Grassi**	**Audi**	**31**	**+1.633**	**11**	6+1^{3}
8	**23**	**(Switzerland) Sébastien Buemi**	**e.Dams-Nissan**	**31**	**+2.455**	**2**	4
9	**20**	**(New Zealand) Mitch Evans**	**Jaguar**	**31**	**+2.980**	**6**	2
10	**66**	**(Germany) Daniel Abt**	**Audi**	**31**	**+4.014**	**16**	1
**11**	7	(Argentina) José María López	Dragon-Penske	31	+4.528	13	
**12**	6	(Germany) Maximilian Günther	Dragon-Penske	31	+6.034	21	
**13**	48	(Switzerland) Edoardo Mortara	Venturi	31	+6.790	17	
**14**	3	(Brazil) Nelson Piquet Jr.	Jaguar	31	+6.833	9	
**15**	22	(United Kingdom) Oliver Rowland	e.Dams-Nissan	31	+7.529	12	
**16**	16	(United Kingdom) Oliver Turvey	NIO	31	+9.241	14	
**17**	8	(France) Tom Dillmann	NIO	31	+9.665	18	
**18**	19	(Brazil) Felipe Massa	Venturi	31	+10.250	15	
Ret	28	(Portugal) António Félix da Costa	Andretti-BMW	25	Accident	6	
Ret	17	(United Kingdom) Gary Paffett	HWA-Venturi	3	Puncture	19	
Ret	94	(Germany) Pascal Wehrlein	Mahindra	1	Accident damage	7	
Ret	5	(Belgium) Stoffel Vandoorne	HWA-Venturi	1	Suspension	22	

- **^2** — Pole position.
- **^3** — Fastest lap.

== Standings after the race ==
Drivers' Championship standings

+/–	Pos	Driver	Points
2	1	(Belgium) Jérôme d'Ambrosio	40
1	2	(Portugal) António Félix da Costa	28 (–12)
1	3	(France) Jean-Éric Vergne	28 (–12)
1	4	(Germany) André Lotterer	19 (–21)
7	5	(Netherlands) Robin Frijns	18 (–22)

Teams' Championship standings

+/–	Pos	Constructor	Points
	1	(China) Techeetah-Citroën	47
1	2	(India) Mahindra	40 (–7)
1	3	(Germany) Andretti-BMW	40 (–7)
3	4	(United Kingdom) Virgin-Audi	36 (–11)
1	5	(France) e.Dams-Nissan	18 (–29)

- Notes: Only the top five positions are included for both sets of standings.

Previous race: 2018 Ad Diriyah ePrix	FIA Formula E Championship; 2018–19 season	Next race: 2019 Santiago ePrix
Previous race: 2018 Marrakesh ePrix	Marrakesh ePrix	Next race: 2020 Marrakesh ePrix
