= 2018 Marrakesh ePrix =

Formula E electric car race in Morocco

Race 3 of 12 of the 2017–18 Formula E Championship
← Previous race	Next race →

Race details
- Date: 13 January 2018
- Official name: 2018 ABB FIA Formula E Marrakesh ePrix
- Location: Circuit International Automobile Moulay El Hassan, Agdal, Marrakesh
- Course: Street circuit
- Course length: 2.971 kilometres (1.846 mi)
- Distance: 33 laps, 98.043 kilometres (60.921 mi)
- Weather: Sunny

Pole position
Driver	(Switzerland) Sébastien Buemi	e.Dams-Renault
- Time: 1:20.355

Fastest lap
Driver	(Brazil) Nelson Piquet Jr.	Jaguar
- Time: 1:22.832 on lap 32

Podium
First	(Sweden) Felix Rosenqvist	Mahindra
Second	(Switzerland) Sébastien Buemi	e.Dams-Renault
Third	(United Kingdom) Sam Bird	Virgin-Citroën

The 2018 Marrakesh ePrix (formally the 2018 ABB FIA Formula E Marrakesh ePrix) was a Formula E electric car race held at the Circuit International Automobile Moulay El Hassan in the Agdal district of Marrakesh, Morocco on 13 January 2018. It was the third round of the 2017–18 Formula E Championship and the second Marrakesh ePrix. The 33-lap race was won by Mahindra driver Felix Rosenqvist after starting from third place. Sébastien Buemi finished in second place for e.Dams-Renault and Virgin driver Sam Bird took third.

Buemi won the pole position by recording the fastest lap in qualifying and maintained his startline advantage heading into the first corner. He held the lead with Bird and Rosenqvist close behind him for much of the first half of the race until a full course yellow flag was necessitated when André Lotterer stopped on track with a hardware failure on his car. Buemi retained the lead after the field made pit stops to switch into a second car but Rosenqvist pressured and passed him with four laps to go. Rosenqvist led the final four laps to clinch his second consecutive victory of the season and the third of his career.

The consequence of the final positions gained Rosenqvist the lead of the Drivers' Championship for the first time in his career with 54 points and Bird was four points behind in second. Jean-Éric Vergne finished in fifth and this meant he fell to third while Nelson Piquet Jr. ran strongly in the race and set the fastest lap, moving him to fourth. Edoardo Mortara rounded out the top five placings. Mahindra increased their Teams' Championship advantage to 18 points over Virgin while Techeetah held third with nine races left in the season.

== Background ==
The Marrakesh ePrix was confirmed as part of Formula E's 2017–18 series schedule in September 2017 by the FIA World Motor Sport Council. It was the third of twelve scheduled single-seater electric car races of the 2017–18 Championship, and the second Marrakesh ePrix. The race was held on 13 January 2018 at the 12-turn 2.97 km (1.85 mi) anti-clockwise Circuit International Automobile Moulay El Hassan street circuit in the Agdal district of Marrakesh, Morocco. The race stewards for Marrakesh included chairman Paulo Longoni, additional international steward Achim Loth and former Bentley factory driver Andy Soucek.

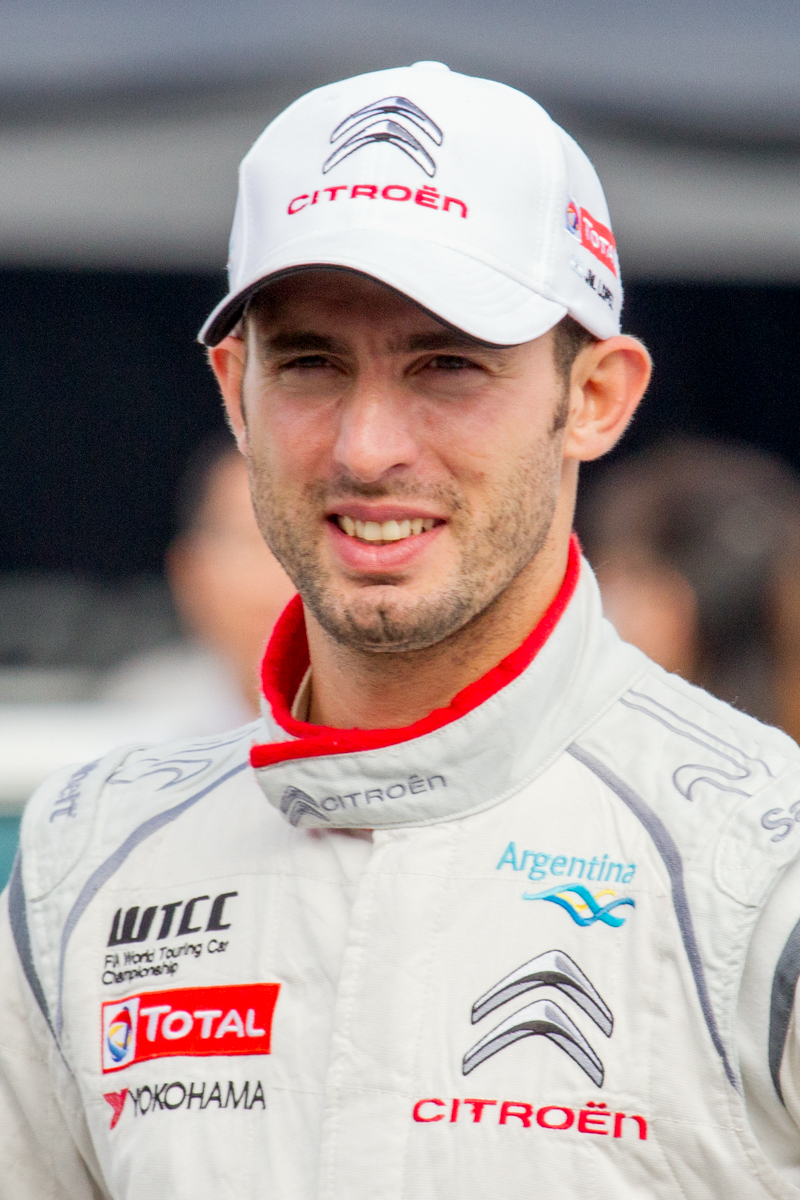
José María López (pictured in 2014) replaced Neel Jani at Dragon for the rest of the season.

Coming into the race Virgin driver Sam Bird led the Drivers' Championship with 35 points, two ahead of Jean-Éric Vergne in second and a further six in front of Felix Rosenqvist in third. Edoardo Mortara was the highest-placed rookie driver in fourth with 24 points and Nick Heidfeld was fifth with 15 points. Mahindra led the Teams' Championship with 44 points with Virgin in second with 41 points. Techeetah stood in third position with 33 points and Venturi (30) and Jaguar (27) contended for fourth.

In an attempt to speed up races starting from Marrakesh, the world governing body of motorsport, the Fédération Internationale de l'Automobile (FIA), elected not to implement a mandatory minimum pit stop time no more and told the teams of the decision. This was due to teams progressively improving their pit stop efficiency which led to the limit being lowered on a gradual scale until the FIA believed the fastest possible limit had been reached. The response from the drivers was mixed: 2016–17 champion Lucas di Grassi was positive but wished the rule was changed before the season. Bird feared drivers would not attach their seat belts on correctly in order to spend less time in the pit lane and lower safety standards, saying "If things like this start to be ignored then it's not the right thing to do." After teams signed a letter conveying their disappointment and safety concerns such as seat belt fastening to the stewards, it was decided to postpone the change until the Santiago ePrix to allow teams to obtain additional safety garage equipment for team members and invest in sports car style seat belts.

The inaugural in-season rookie test was scheduled to be held at the circuit the day after the race. Teams were permitted six hours of running and were allowed to field two drivers who were not in possession of an e-licence at the time of the test. A total of ten teams fielded two drivers each for a total of 20 participants for the ePrix. There were two pre-race driver changes. Having missed the season-opening Hong Kong double header to allow World Endurance Championship driver Kamui Kobayashi to race because of a sponsorship demand, former Deutsche Tourenwagen Masters competitor Tom Blomqvist was confirmed to race for Andretti for Marrakesh and the rest of the season. 2016 24 Hours of Le Mans co-winner and World Endurance Champion Neel Jani struggled for pace at the Hong Kong double header and entered into discussions with Dragon over how the team should progress. Both sides mutually agreed to end their alliance early. Jani's place at the team was filled by three-time World Touring Car champion José María López for the rest of the season.

== Practice ==
Two practice sessions—both on Saturday morning—were held before the late afternoon race. The first session ran for 45 minutes and the second for half an hour. A half an hour untimed shakedown session was held on Friday afternoon to enable teams to check the reliability of their cars and their electronic systems. The first practice session started on a dusty track and several drivers made errors while exploring track limits but lap times fell by one second as it was cleaned by drivers. Di Grassi used 200 kW (270 hp) of power to go fastest with a late lap of 1 minute, 20.310 seconds, nine-tenths of a second quicker than Jérôme d'Ambrosio in second. Daniel Abt, Mitch Evans, Sébastien Buemi (e.Dams-Renault), Bird, Vergne, Nelson Piquet Jr., (Jaguar), Rosenqvist and Oliver Turvey (NIO) filled positions three to ten. A persistent software bug affected the power cycles of the Venturi cars of Mortara and Maro Engel and cut off their powertrains seven times each. Similarly, André Lotterer reset his car after stopping on track. Heavy fog descended over the track at the start of the second session. While it caused mild visibility issues, it was not thick enough to disrupt proceedings. Six drivers led the session but Abt lowered the unofficial track lap record to a 1-minute, 19.760 seconds to go fastest. His teammate di Grassi was 0.138 seconds adrift in second and Buemi placed third. Evans equalled his first practice result in fourth. His teammate Piquet, Alex Lynn, López, Rosenqvist, and the Techeetah pair of Vergne and Lotterer completed the top ten. As in the previous session, several drivers locked their tyres and ran onto the run-off areas due to a dusty track with Vergne and António Félix da Costa controlling their cars despite brake-related issues.

== Qualifying ==
Saturday's afternoon qualifying session ran for an hour and was divided into four groups of five cars. Each group was determined by a lottery system and was permitted six minutes of on-track activity. All drivers were limited to two timed laps with one at maximum power. The fastest five overall competitors in the four groups participated in a "Super Pole" session with one driver on the track at any time going out in reverse order from fifth to first. Each of the five drivers was limited to one timed lap and the starting order was determined by the competitor's fastest times (Super Pole from first to fifth, and group qualifying from sixth to twentieth). The driver and team who recorded the fastest time were awarded three points towards their respective championships. Qualifying took place in dry but cold and foggy weather. Teams kept their cars in their garages for as long as they could so that there was no overcrowding on the track.

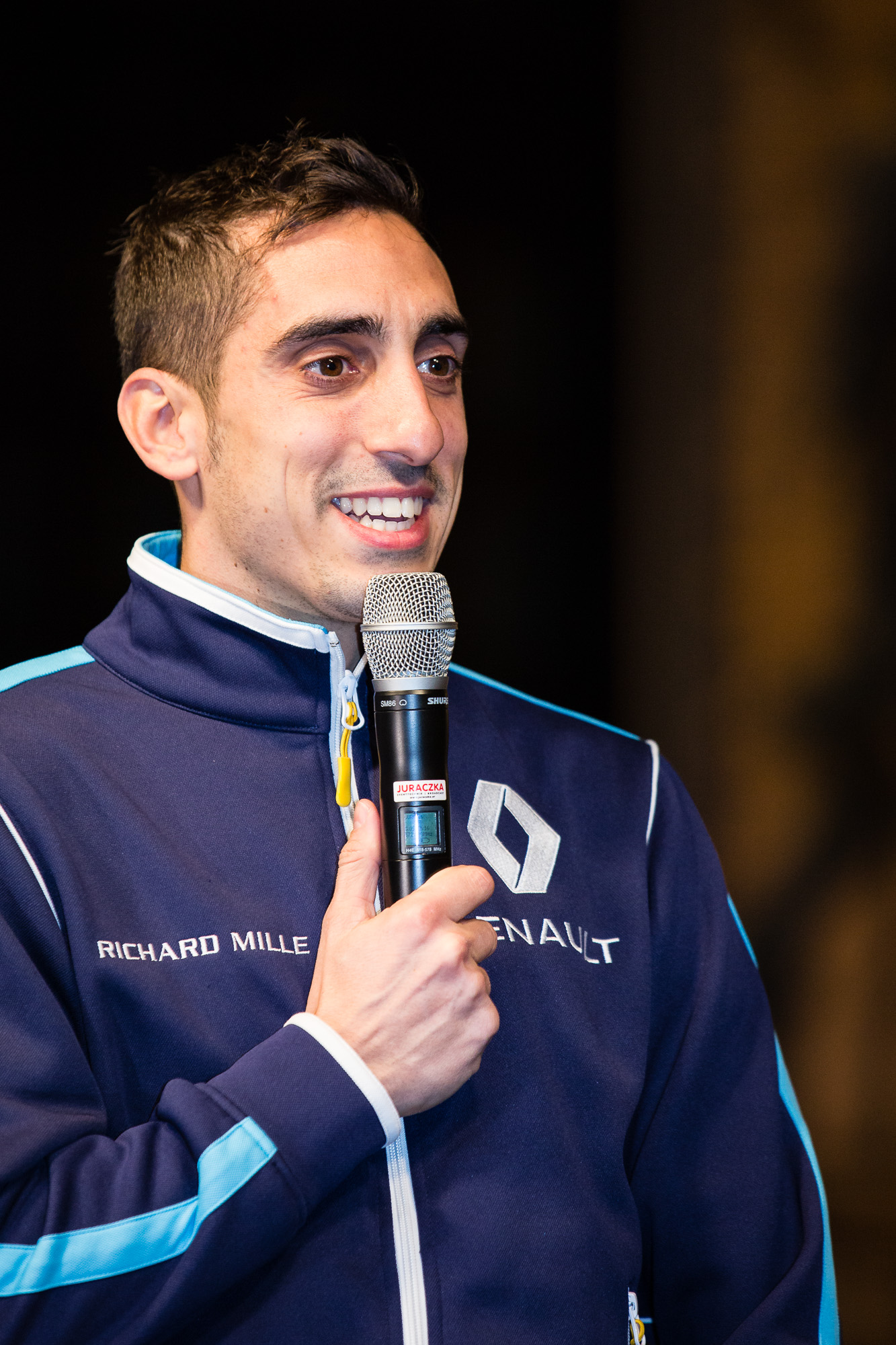
Sébastien Buemi (pictured in 2016) took the ninth pole position of his career and his first since the 2017 Paris ePrix.

In the first group of five drivers, di Grassi was the early pace setter with López a tenth slower in second. In his debut Formula E qualifying session, Blomqvist in third glanced the barrier which lodged part of an advertising billboard in his right-side wheel guard. D'Ambrosio and Lotterer were the group's slowest two drivers. Buemi was one-tenth off di Grassi's pace but his lap allowed him to lead the second group. Lynn, Luca Filippi and Engel were second to fourth. A loose rear slowed Nico Prost and he was fifth in the group. In the third group, Rosenqvist set the overall fastest lap in group qualifying with an early effort of 1 minute, 20.115 seconds. Bird was four-tenths of a second slower in second. Vergne was third with Heidfeld and Mortara the third group's slowest two competitors. Heidfeld went too fast heading towards the entry of turn eleven and drifted sideways into an outside tyre barrier at the turn's exit which inflicted damage to his car. Consequently, Mortara slowed because of the accident; he began from 18th after further electrical issues stopped him at the final corner.

The start of the fourth group was delayed since marshals needed to repair the damaged wall and remove Heidfeld's car from the track. A large amount of water spilled onto the tarmac surface at turn 11 worsened its condition and bodywork debris was in the area. Just as group four had achieved a rhythm, Félix da Costa made an error on his fast lap because of a deflating tyre putting him over the turn seven kerb and into the exit barrier. This stopped the session to allow marshals to extricate the car from the circuit. Abt and Turvey were given dispensation to have a second maximum power lap. Piquet led group four despite going wide at the final turn. Abt was second after he lost time in the final third of the lap. Evans also ran wide at the final turn and took third with Turvey fourth. At the end of group qualifying, Rosenqvist, di Grassi, López, Buemi qualified for super pole because of their lap times. Buemi attacked on his attempt and took his first pole position of the season, the ninth of his career, and his first since the 2017 Paris ePrix with a time of 1 minute, 20.355 seconds. He was joined on the grid's front row by Bird, who had pole position until Buemi's lap. Rosenqvist took third after mounting the turn five kerb and hitting the barrier. An error almost placed López in fourth into the turn nine wall. A motor generator unit problem left di Grassi in fifth. After qualifying, Lotterer was demoted to 20th for missing a signal to enter the weighbridge. The rest of the grid lined up after Lotterer's penalty as Lynn, Piquet, Abt, Evans, Turvey, Filippi, Blomqvist, Vergne, Engel, Prost, d'Ambrosio, Heidfeld, Mortara, Félix da Costa and Lotterer.

=== Qualifying classification ===
Final qualifying classification
Pos.	No.	Driver	Team	GS	SP	Grid
1	9	(Switzerland) Sébastien Buemi	e.Dams-Renault	1:20.491	1:20.355	1
2	2	(United Kingdom) Sam Bird	Virgin-Citroën	1:20.563	1:20.615	2
3	19	(Sweden) Felix Rosenqvist	Mahindra	1:20.115	1:21.196	3
4	6	(Argentina) José María López	Dragon-Penske	1:20.417	1:21.369	4
5	1	(Brazil) Lucas di Grassi	Audi	1:20.314	1:21.444	5
6	36	(United Kingdom) Alex Lynn	Virgin-Citroën	1:20.567	—N/a	6
7	3	(Brazil) Nelson Piquet Jr.	Jaguar	1:20.585	—N/a	7
8	66	(Germany) Daniel Abt	Audi	1:20.605	—N/a	8
9	20	(New Zealand) Mitch Evans	Jaguar	1:20.690	—N/a	9
10	16	(United Kingdom) Oliver Turvey	NIO	1:20.748	—N/a	PL^{1}
11	68	(Italy) Luca Filippi	NIO	1:20.804	—N/a	11
12	27	(United Kingdom) Tom Blomqvist	Andretti-BMW	1:20.870	—N/a	12
13	25	(France) Jean-Éric Vergne	Techeetah-Renault	1:20.906	—N/a	13
14	5	(Germany) Maro Engel	Venturi	1:20.920	—N/a	14
15	8	(France) Nico Prost	e.Dams-Renault	1:20.937	—N/a	15
16	7	(Belgium) Jérôme d'Ambrosio	Dragon-Penske	1:21.176	—N/a	PL^{1}
17	18	(Germany) André Lotterer	Techeetah-Renault	1:21.222	—N/a	20^{2}
18	23	(Germany) Nick Heidfeld	Mahindra	1:28.671	—N/a	17
19	4	(Switzerland) Edoardo Mortara	Venturi	1:36.733	—N/a	18
20	28	(Portugal) António Félix da Costa	Andretti-BMW	—N/a	—N/a	19

Notes:

- ^1— Oliver Turvey and Jérôme d'Ambrosio started from the pit lane due to technical problems with their respective cars.
- ^2— André Lotterer was demoted to the back of the field for missing the signal to enter the weighbridge.

== Race ==
The race started at 16:00 Western European Time (UTC+0) on 13 January. The weather at the start were dry and sunny with the air temperature between 15.05 to 15.8 °C (59.09 to 60.44 °F) and the track temperature 14 °C (57 °F). A special feature of Formula E is the "Fan Boost" feature, an additional 100 kilowatts (130 hp) of power to use in the driver's second car. The three drivers who were allowed to use the boost were determined by a fan vote. For the Marrakesh race, Buemi, di Grassi and Abt were handed the extra power. Chassis manufacturer Spark Racing Technology ordered that Rosenqvist's battery be changed half an hour before the race began after Mahindra were alterted to the problem. Similarly, Buemi began the race in his second car as the one he intended to start in had a water pump failure. Audi undertook a precautionary power inverter change in di Grassi's car. Turvey and d'Ambrosio started from the pit lane because of technical problems with their respective cars. Buemi made a clean start to retain the lead heading into the first corner as Bird and Rosenqvist maintained second and third. Both ran close behind Buemi as most drivers also made clean starts. Mortara made contact with another car further down the field.

Vergne moved from 13th to 10th by the end of the first lap, while d'Ambrosio's pit lane start lost him four positions over the same distance. At the end of the first lap, Buemi led Bird, Rosenqvist, López, di Grassi, Lynn, Abt, Piquet, Evans and Vergne. At the start of lap two, Abt lined up an overtake on Lynn for sixth place on the start/finish straight and both drivers made contact into the first turn. Lynn was spun onto the run-off area, and re-joined the track in 19th. Meanwhile, Piquet had moved to fifth place, while his fellow countryman di Grassi passed López for fourth by forcing this way through. Shortly after López fell to seventh when Piquet and Abt passed him on lap three. Prost was sent into a spin by Lotterer, dropping to 19th. Turvey was the main beneficiary of the incident, moving to 15th place. Di Grassi and his Brazilian compatriot Piquet battled for fourth position and it ended when di Grassi slowed with a battery management system failure. He drove off the racing line and Audi instructed him to stop his car. Di Grassi attempted a restart procedure, prompting the waving of localised yellow flags. He returned to his garage to retire. After the race, di Grassi explained his car started to cut out on the previous lap.

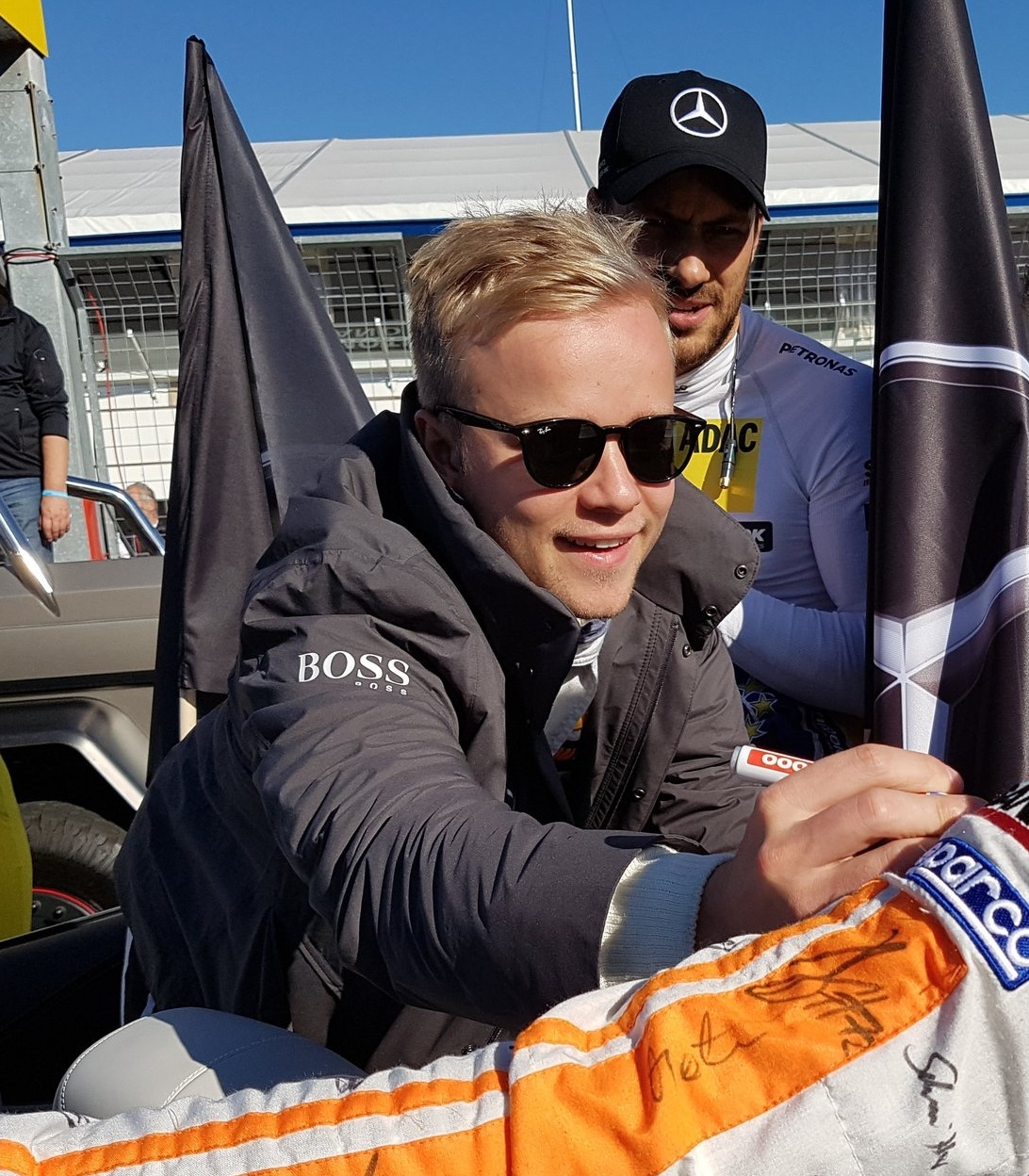
Felix Rosenqvist (pictured in 2016) passed Buemi to secure his third career victory and his second in a row.

Meanwhile, his teammate Abt overtook Piquet for fourth but was issued a drive-through penalty for his earlier contact with Lynn. Abt exited the pit lane behind Lynn in 15th place as Turvey moved to tenth. Multiple incidents occurred in the middle of the pack: Filippi and Mortara made contact and Félix da Costa hit Heidfeld who angrily gesticulated to the latter. Vergne was sixth and his teammate Lotterer 13th. The problems affecting the Audi pair of di Grassi and Abt promoted López to fourth. On lap 15, Lotterer steered off the racing line to retire with a hardware malfunction that locked his brakes. Course officials waved yellow flags at the section of the track Lotterer stopped at for half a minute until the race director decided a full course yellow was necessary. On the 16th lap, Bird slowed briefly with gearbox issues on the start/finish straight, allowing Rosenqvist to take second.

The leaders elected to make their pit stops to change into their second cars during the full course yellow. Buemi kept the lead with his advantage over Rosenqvist increasing to 1 1/2 seconds. Piquet returned to fourth ahead of López and Vergne moved to fifth. The Venturi pair of Mortara and Engel exited the pit lane in the top ten. Evans, Félix da Costa and Abt lost half a minute of time because they made their pit stops before the activation of the full course yellow procedure. Turvey was the race's third retirement after a technical problem affected his second car. At the front, the lead trio of Buemi, Rosenqvist and Bird were close behind one another and distanced themselves from the rest of the field. Rosenqvist quickly halved Buemi's advantage and later eased off slightly to allow Buemi to open his lead to a second. Rosenqvist also had slightly more electrical energy to use than Buemi and was tempting Buemi to use FanBoost. Buemi however could not use the FanBoost because it was not programmed to work on the car he was driving, and Rosenqvist used more electrical energy and braked later than Buemi to pass him on the inside for the lead before the end of the backstraight and the turn seven left-hander on lap 29.

With three laps to go, Mortara attempted to overtake his teammate Engel—who battled Heidfeld—and the Venturi pair made contact. Engel had little space to negotiate through and ploughed into the side of Heidfeld. Engel and Heidfeld were able to continue driving but the damage sustained to Mortara's car forced him to park at the side of the circuit and retire. Piquet set the eace's fastest lap on the penultimate lap, completing a circuit in 1 minute, 22.832 seconds, earning him one point. Rosenqvist crossed the start/finish line after 33 laps to claim his second win in a row and the third of his career. Buemi followed 0.945 seconds later in second and Bird completed the podium in third. Off the podium, Piquet equalled his best result of the season in fourth and Vergne took fifth. López finished sixth despite radio problems losing him access to electrical energy readouts. Engel was deemed responsible for causing the Heidfeld-Mortara crash and incurred a post-race drive through penalty converted into time, dropping him to twelfth. Hence, Heidfeld inherited seventh. Blomqvist was consistent in his debut race and took eighth. Lynn, Abt, Evans and Engel followed in the next four places. Prost had 20 seconds added to his race time and was demoted to 13th after he was found to have exceeded the 50 km/h (31 mph) speed limit during the full course yellow flag. Félix da Costa, d'Ambrosio, Filippi and Mortara were the final finishers.

=== Post-race ===
The top three drivers appeared on the podium to collect their trophies and spoke to the media in a later press conference. Rosenqvist spoke of his delight of returning to Marrakesh after losing the victory to Buemi in the 2016 race, saying he now felt settled into Formula E and no longer believed he was "a rookie driver", adding "I was learning racecraft in the beginning and losing here was our biggest lesson of the year – we realised we had a lot of work to do and a lot of things to improve." Buemi stated he did not mind losing the win to Rosenqvist, feeling the latter had "payback" after his victory in the second 2017 Berlin ePrix was revoked because of a sporting infringement, "When you lose a race you always end up a bit disappointed. But everyone thought we had no pace and we were done, and we came here, had pole and finished second. We showed everyone we're still there." Third-place finisher Bird revealed his car was affected by a rectifiable reoccurring issue since Hong Kong and made the decision not to replace the affected component, "But still, third place is strong points and it’s a third place with a big issue! I didn’t think I was going to finish the race in the first car, I thought I was going to be pulling over and retiring so actually we were quite relieved with the full course yellow came and saved my bacon a little bit."

Engel was perplexed with the penalty imposed on him for the contact with teammate Mortara and Heidfeld, arguing that he was attempting to avoid any damage where possible by mounting the kerbs on the inside and held the belief that Heidfeld did not leave enough space for him to pass through. Abt was also annoyed with the drive-through penalty he incurred for his second lap clash with Lynn. He believed it was a "racing incident" and felt the steward's judgement was harsh, saying "In an incident like this Alex is going to say it is my fault and I will say it is more his fault because I think it was avoidable as I was already next to him when I made the move and he turns in." Di Grassi believed he would have stayed close by Rosenqvist had he not suffered technical problems with his car, saying "As a worst-case scenario, a third place would have been easy to achieve, if not a win." Audi team principal Allan McNish affirmed the manufacturer would return to competitiveness in the season's upcoming races but admitted his disappointment at the unreliability of the team's cars. He stated his belief this would invigorate a comeback, "We just have to fightback and dig in. It’s like Le Mans. It only finishes at the end of the race, it doesn’t finish halfway through. You have to have the spirit to come back stronger, and we will do that straightaway."

The final positions moved Rosenqvist to top of the Drivers' Championship for the first time in his career with 54 points. Bird's second-place result dropped him to four points behind Rosenqvist in second while Vergne fell to third place after finishing fifth. Piquet gained three positions to move into fourth on 25 points and Mortara was fifth, one further point behind. Mahindra further extended their advantage atop of the Teams' Championship on 75 points; Virgin had 17 less points but still maintained second place and Techeetah remained in third. Jaguar overtook Venturi for fourth with nine races left in the season. Rosenqvist spoke of his satisfaction of leading the championship and revealed it motivated him not to take too many risks in the upcoming races.

=== Race classification ===
Drivers who scored championship points are denoted in bold.

Final race classification
Pos.	No.	Driver	Team	Laps	Time/Retired	Grid	Points
1	**19**	**(Sweden) Felix Rosenqvist**	**Mahindra**	**33**	**48:04.751**	**3**	**25**
2	**9**	**(Switzerland) Sébastien Buemi**	**e.Dams-Renault**	**33**	**+0.945**	**1**	**18+3^{3}**
3	**2**	**(United Kingdom) Sam Bird**	**Virgin-Citroën**	**33**	**+5.762**	**2**	**15**
4	**3**	**(Brazil) Nelson Piquet Jr.**	**Jaguar**	**33**	**+6.554**	**7**	**12+1^{4}**
5	**25**	**(France) Jean-Éric Vergne**	**Techeetah-Renault**	**33**	**+12.238**	**13**	**10**
6	**6**	**(Argentina) José María López**	**Dragon-Penske**	**33**	**+16.491**	**4**	**8**
7	**23**	**(Germany) Nick Heidfeld**	**Mahindra**	**33**	**+28.381**	**18**	**6**
8	**27**	**(United Kingdom) Tom Blomqvist**	**Andretti-BMW**	**33**	**+32.380**	**12**	**4**
9	**36**	**(United Kingdom) Alex Lynn**	**Virgin-Citroën**	**33**	**+33.520**	**6**	**2**
10	**66**	**(Germany) Daniel Abt**	**Audi**	**33**	**+40.951**	**8**	**1**
**11**	20	(New Zealand) Mitch Evans	Jaguar	33	+46.278	9	—
**12**	5	(Germany) Maro Engel	Venturi	33	+46.915	14	—^{5}
**13**	8	(France) Nico Prost	e.Dams-Renault	33	+53.099	16	—^{6}
**14**	28	(Portugal) António Félix da Costa	Andretti-BMW	33	+1:01.116	19	—
**15**	7	(Belgium) Jérôme d'Ambrosio	Dragon-Penske	33	+1:13.805	15	—
**16**	68	(Italy) Luca Filippi	NIO	32	+1 Lap	11	—
**Ret**	4	(Switzerland) Edoardo Mortara	Venturi	30	Engine	17	—
**Ret**	16	(United Kingdom) Oliver Turvey	NIO	17	Technical	10	—
**Ret**	18	(Germany) André Lotterer	Techeetah-Renault	14	Hardware	20	—
**Ret**	1	(Brazil) Lucas di Grassi	Audi	7	Battery	5	—

Notes:

- **^3** — Three points for pole position.
- **^4** — One point for fastest lap.
- **^5** — Maro Engel had twenty seconds added to his race time for causing a collision.
- **^6** — Nico Prost was penalised twenty seconds for exceeding the 50 km/h (31 mph) speed limit during the full course yellow period.

== Standings after the race ==
Drivers' Championship standings

+/–	Pos	Driver	Points
2	1	(Sweden) Felix Rosenqvist	54
1	2	(United Kingdom) Sam Bird	50 (−4)
1	3	(France) Jean-Éric Vergne	43 (−11)
3	4	(Brazil) Nelson Piquet Jr.	25 (−29)
1	5	(Switzerland) Edoardo Mortara	24 (−30)

Teams' Championship standings

+/–	Pos	Constructor	Points
	1	(India) Mahindra	75
	2	(United Kingdom) Virgin-Citroën	58 (−17)
	3	(China) Techeetah-Renault	43 (−33)
1	4	(United Kingdom) Jaguar	40 (−35)
1	5	(Monaco) Venturi	30 (−45)

- Notes: Only the top five positions are included for both sets of standings.

Previous race: 2017 Hong Kong ePrix	FIA Formula E Championship; 2017–18 season	Next race: 2018 Santiago ePrix
Previous race: 2016 Marrakesh ePrix	Marrakesh ePrix	Next race: 2019 Marrakesh ePrix
