= 2016 Marrakesh ePrix =

Race 2 of 12 of the 2016–17 Formula E Championship
← Previous race	Next race →

Race details
- Date: 12 November 2016
- Official name: 2016 FIA Formula E Marrakesh ePrix
- Location: Circuit Moulay El Hassan, Marrakesh, Morocco
- Course: Street circuit
- Course length: 2.971 km (1.846 miles)
- Distance: 33 laps, 98.04 km (60.92 miles)
- Weather: Sunny; Air 21.5 to 22 °C (70.7 to 71.6 °F), Track 25 to 27.8 °C (77.0 to 82.0 °F)
- Attendance: 7,000

Pole position
Driver	(Sweden) Felix Rosenqvist	Mahindra
- Time: 1:21.509

Fastest lap
Driver	(France) Loïc Duval	Dragon-Penske
- Time: 1:22.600 on lap 30

Podium
First	(Switzerland) Sébastien Buemi	e.Dams-Renault
Second	(United Kingdom) Sam Bird	Virgin-Citroën
Third	(Sweden) Felix Rosenqvist	Mahindra

The 2016 Marrakesh ePrix (formally the 2016 FIA Formula E Marrakesh ePrix) was a Formula E electric motor race held on 12 November 2016 at the Circuit Moulay El Hassan in Marrakesh, Morocco in front of a crowd of 7,000 people. It was the second round of the 2016–17 Formula E Championship and the first time the series had visited the African continent. The 33-lap race was won by e.Dams-Renault driver Sébastien Buemi, who started from seventh position. Virgin's Sam Bird finished second and Mahindra driver Felix Rosenqvist was third.

Rosenqvist won the pole position by recording the fastest lap in qualifying and pulled away from the rest of the field to keep the lead until the mandatory round of pit stops when Buemi led for one lap until he made his stop. Rosenqvist regained the lead but was required to conserve electrical energy because he made a pit stop a lap earlier than other drivers. This allowed Buemi to narrow the time deficit between the two drivers and he passed Rosenqvist for the lead on the 27th lap. Buemi held it for the remainder of the race to win. There were two lead changes among two different drivers during the course of the race.

It was Buemi's second consecutive victory of the season and his eighth in the series. The result increased Buemi's lead in the Drivers' Championship to 22 points ahead of Lucas di Grassi. Buemi's teammate Nico Prost moved from fourth to third, while Rosenqvist's finish moved him to fourth place, and Bird was fifth. e.Dams-Renault expanded their Teams' Championship advantage over Audi Sport ABT and Mahindra Racing by 19 points with ten races left in the season.

== Background ==
In February 2016, Stéphane Roux, the chief organiser of the World Touring Car Championship (WTCC), announced to the local press that Formula E was eager to hold a race on the streets of Marrakesh in the "near future". The Marrakesh ePrix was later confirmed as part of Formula E's 2016–17 schedule in September 2016 by the FIA World Motor Sport Council. It was the inaugural running of the race as part of the FIA Formula E Championship, and the first time that the series had visited the African continent. The Marrakesh ePrix was the second of 12 single-seater electric car races of the 2016–17 Championship and was held on 12 November 2016 at the Circuit Moulay El Hassan. Prior to the ePrix, Formula One had visited Morocco in 1958 for the Moroccan Grand Prix at the Ain-Diab Circuit in Casablanca and the country has held WTCC races since 2009. There were ten teams fielding two drivers each for the ePrix.

Before the race, e.Dams-Renault driver Sébastien Buemi led the Drivers' Championship with 25 points, seven ahead of Lucas di Grassi in second and a further three in front of third-placed Nick Heidfeld. Nico Prost was fourth on 12 points, and António Félix da Costa was fifth with ten points. Renault e.Dams led the Teams' Championship with 37 points; Audi Sport ABT and Andretti were tied for second place with 18 points each. Mahindra were fourth with 16 points, nine ahead of fifth-placed team NextEV.

Buemi said that was looking forward to competing in Marrakesh but knew that it would not be easy to repeat his Hong Kong ePrix victory. He was aware of how different the two tracks were and said that it would be "exciting" to visit Marrakesh for the first time. His team wanted to maximise every detail feasible and Buemi could not wait to drive on the track. Mahindra driver Felix Rosenqvist stated that his objective for the race was to continue the momentum his team had built at the season's previous round and wanted to extract the maximum amount possible from his car as soon as he could even at the cost of still learning slightly more about it. However, he was unsure whether the track's layout suited him because it required a different driving style and rhythm than the circuit in Hong Kong.

The layout of the 2.97 km (1.85 mi) long anti-clockwise track was revealed on 17 October. Nelson Piquet Jr. felt it would be a fast circuit because it was purpose-built for motor racing and other series had visited the track before. He described it as seeming like it would be slightly wider and easier along with relying less on driver skill and making competitive racing closer. Heidfeld stated that the track layout would mean the drivers would be challenged on electrical energy management and there would a high chance of a full course yellow flag being shown or a safety car being deployed because of the large amount of trackside barriers. Virgin's José María López, who raced on the track in the WTCC, said it would be "tricky" having been used to touring cars which require more space and it would feel wider with Formula E vehicles but spoke off his feeling there would be plenty of space for overtaking manoeuvres.

== Practice ==
Two practice sessions—both on Saturday morning—were held before the Saturday late afternoon race. The first session ran for 45 minutes; the second for 30 minutes. A shakedown session was held on the Friday before the event where Buemi recorded the fastest lap time of 1 minute, 30.152 seconds, one second faster than Rosenqvist and Jean-Éric Vergne for Techeetah in second and third. First practice was run in cool weather with low sun because dawn had broken through one hour before. Di Grassi used 200 kW (270 hp) of power during a qualifying simulation lap to go fastest with a 1 minute, 21.923 seconds lap, almost two-tenths of a second faster than Prost in second. Buemi, Vergne, Félix da Costa, Jérôme d'Ambrosio, Rosenqvist, Mitch Evans, Piquet, and Stéphane Sarrazin rounded out the session's top ten drivers. The full course yellow flag was necessitated when Loïc Duval stopped his Dragon car after five minutes. Evans spun and ran wide at the first turn late in the session, and López damaged his car's suspension after colliding with the turn 11 barrier, causing him to spend most of practice in the pit lane for repairs, but further damage was caused with another hit in the session's closing period. In the second practice session, Buemi was fastest with a lap of 1 minute, 20.599 seconds; Rosenqvist, Vergne, Oliver Turvey, Duval, Daniel Abt, Piquet, Félix da Costa, di Grassi and Heidfeld followed in the top ten. The session was ended prematurely with three minutes remaining when Bird lost control of the rear of his car, slid into the turn eight barrier, heavily damaging his vehicle's rear, and stopped on the circuit.

== Qualifying ==
Saturday afternoon's qualifying session ran for 60 minutes and was divided into four groups of five cars. Each group was determined by a lottery system and was permitted six minutes of on-track activity. All drivers were limited to two timed laps with one at maximum power. The fastest five overall competitors in the four groups participated in a "Super Pole" session with one driver on the track at any time going out in reverse order from fifth to first. Each of the five drivers was limited to one timed lap and the starting order was determined by the competitor's fastest times (Super Pole from first to fifth, and group qualifying from sixth to twentieth). The driver and team who recorded the fastest time were awarded three points towards their respective championships.

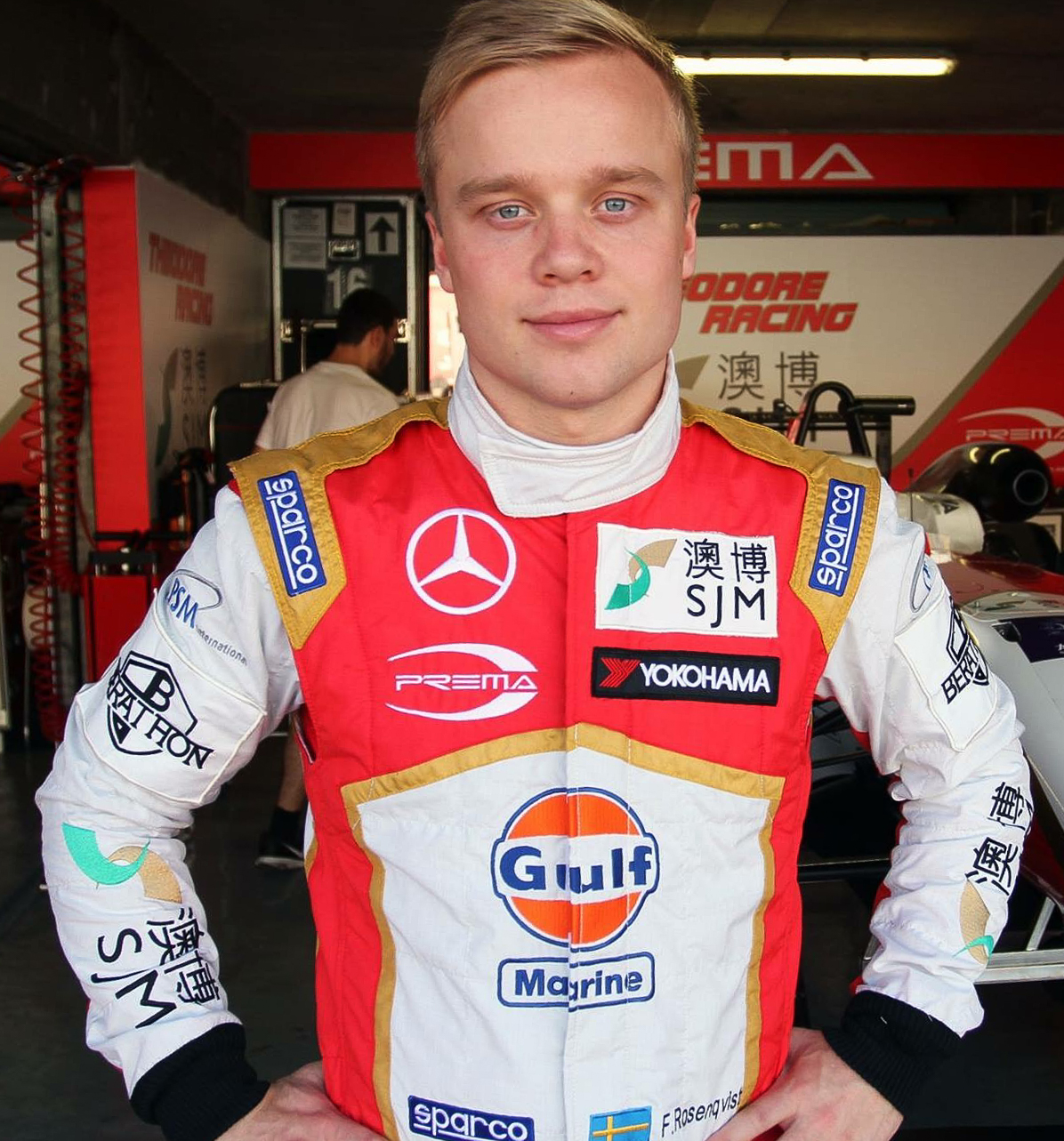
Felix Rosenqvist (pictured in 2015) had the first pole position in Formula E in his second race in the series.

In the first group of five runners, Prost paced the session, nearly three-tenths of a second faster than Félix da Costa in second, and Lopez third. D'Ambrosio and Ma Qinghua (who was unable to complete a maximum power lap) were the group's two slowest drivers. Buemi was the fastest driver in the second group, half a second ahead of teammate Turvey. Heidfeld, Sarazzin, and Evans rounded out the top five. In the third group, Vergne recorded the overall fastest group qualifying time of any competitor at 1 minute, 20.993 seconds. Di Grassi qualified 12th overall after narrowly avoiding colliding with the wall between turns six and seven. His teammate Abt was second quickest in the group, ahead of di Grassi, Maro Engel (Venturi), and Duval, who ran wide on his timed reduced power lap. Rosenqvist immediately ran on full power and was the fastest driver in the fourth group, ahead of Bird, who equalled Vergne's pace at first, but then his rear tyre made contact with the wall, losing him time. Piquet was third on his fastest lap which saw him hit the wall. Robin Frijns and Adam Carroll (Jaguar) were the fourth group's slowest drivers; Carroll locked his rear tyres and ran wide at the first corner, restricting him to 20th. At the end of group qualifying, Rosenqvist, Vergne, Buemi, Bird and Piquet qualified for super pole.

Piquet was the first driver to attempt his lap in super pole and heavily locked his tyres in turn nine and ran over some kerbs, as well as grazing the wall, qualifying fourth. Bird opted to drive cautiously to achieve an improved balance and took third. Buemi missed the turn one apex but was 0.140 seconds faster to move into provisional pole position. Rosenqvist began his timed lap by going faster than Buemi in the first sector. He drove cleanly in the track's next section, before running smoothly to move into first with a lap of 1 minute, 21.509 seconds. Vergne was unable to set a lap time because an operational error by his team caused him to miss the 30-second period to exit the pit lane and participate. Hence, Rosenqvist won his and Mahindra's first pole position in Formula E. After qualifying, Buemi incurred a five-place grid penalty because his car's fire extinguisher was 3.25 kg (7.2 lb) underweight after it had been emptied from a possible leak. Buemi was fined €2,500. The rest of the grid lined up after penalties as Abt, Prost, Buemi, Turvey, Frijns, Félix da Costa, Heidfeld, di Grassi, López, Engel, Sarrazin, Evans, d'Ambrosio, Ma, Duval and Carroll.

=== Qualifying classification ===
Final qualifying classification
Pos.	No.	Driver	Team	GS	SP	Grid
1	19	(Sweden) Felix Rosenqvist	Mahindra	1:21.175	1:21.509	1
2	9	(Switzerland) Sébastien Buemi	e.Dams-Renault	1:21.350	1:21.546	7^{1}
3	2	(United Kingdom) Sam Bird	Virgin-Citroën	1:21.392	1:21.686	2
4	3	(Brazil) Nelson Piquet Jr.	NextEV NIO	1:21.651	1:23.879	3
5	25	(France) Jean-Éric Vergne	Techeetah-Renault	1:20.993	—	4
6	66	(Germany) Daniel Abt	Audi Sport ABT	1:21.725	—N/a	5
7	8	(France) Nico Prost	e.Dams-Renault	1:21.777	—N/a	6
8	88	(United Kingdom) Oliver Turvey	NextEV NIO	1:21.853	—N/a	8
9	27	(Netherlands) Robin Frijns	Andretti-BMW	1:21.912	—N/a	9
10	28	(Portugal) António Félix da Costa	Andretti-BMW	1:22.073	—N/a	10
11	23	(Germany) Nick Heidfeld	Mahindra	1:22.074	—N/a	11
12	11	(Brazil) Lucas di Grassi	Audi Sport ABT	1:22.081	—N/a	12
13	37	(Argentina) José María López	Virgin-Citroën	1:22.133	—N/a	13
14	5	(Germany) Maro Engel	Venturi	1:22.236	—N/a	14
15	4	(France) Stéphane Sarrazin	Venturi	1:22.270	—N/a	15
16	20	(New Zealand) Mitch Evans	Jaguar	1:22.355	—N/a	16
17	7	(Belgium) Jérôme d'Ambrosio	Dragon-Penske	1:22.681	—N/a	17
18	33	(China) Ma Qinghua	Techeetah-Renault	1:23.248	—N/a	18
19	6	(France) Loïc Duval	Dragon-Penske	1:23.933	—N/a	19
20	47	(United Kingdom) Adam Carroll	Jaguar	1:25.695	—N/a	20

Notes:

- ^1— Sébastien Buemi was issued with a five-place grid penalty because of an underweight fire extinguisher.

== Race ==
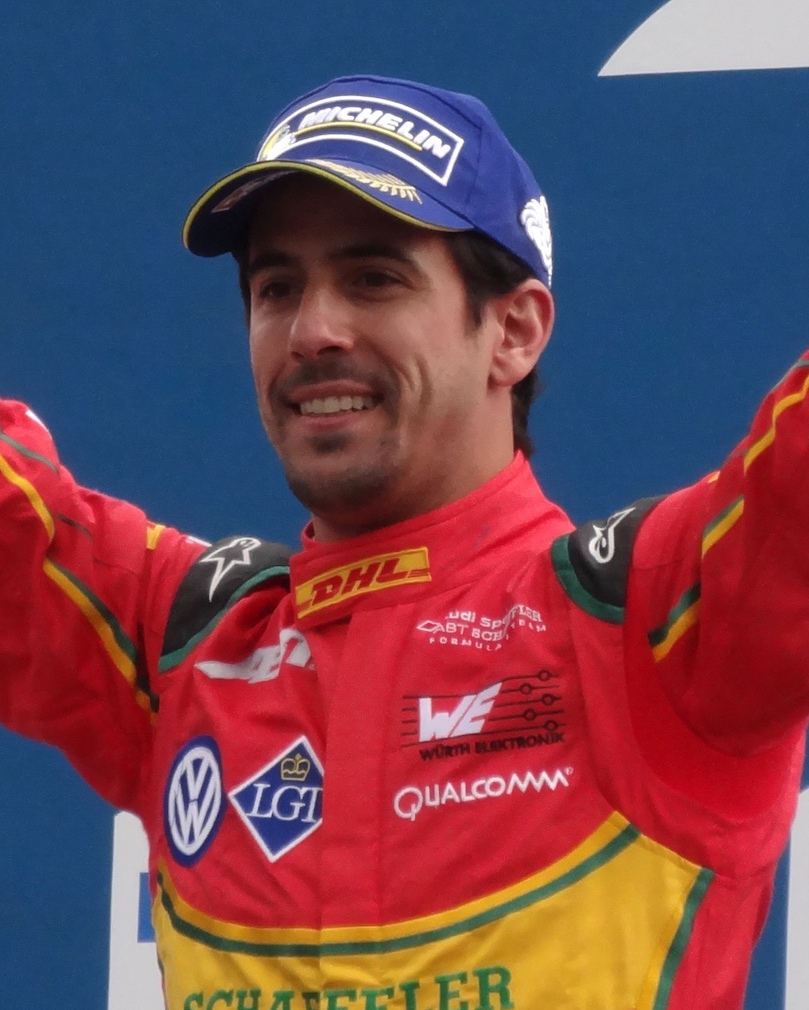
Lucas di Grassi started 12th and finished fifth.

A special feature of Formula E is the "Fan Boost" feature, an additional 100 kW (130 hp) of power to use in the driver's second car. The three drivers allowed to use the boost were determined by a fan vote. For the Marrakesh race, Abt, Buemi and di Grassi were handed the extra power. Weather conditions at the start of the race were dry and sunny with an air temperature ranging between 21.5 and 22 °C (70.7 and 71.6 °F), and a track temperature between 25 and 27.8 °C (77.0 and 82.0 °F); conditions were expected to remain consistent with no rain forecast. A total of 7,000 people attended the event. When the race started at 16:00 Western European Time (UTC+0), Rosenqvist made a fast start to keep the lead entering the first corner. Bird narrowly kept second from Piquet and Vergne. Abt attempted to pass a slow-starting Vergne on the outside into turn one but both drivers went wide after Piquet locked his tyres and Abt held off Prost on the inside. Heidfeld made a slow start and separated the field into two halves, delaying di Grassi. Engel and Heidfeld twice struck each other between turns one and three, but both continued without sustaining major damage to their cars. Carroll moved from 20th to 17th by the end of the first lap, while his teammate Evans lost four positions over the same distance.

At the end of the first lap, Rosenqvist led followed by: Bird, Piquet, Vergne, Abt, Prost, Buemi, Turvey, Frijns and Félix da Costa. Rosenqvist began to pull away from the rest of the field by recording fastest laps to open a two-second advantage over Bird by the start of the fourth lap. He informed his team that the dashboard on his steering wheel displayed only one page, limiting the amount of information available to him. Buemi overtook teammate Prost on the outside at turn seven to move into sixth place on the third lap, as Heidfeld went wide, allowing di Grassi to pass him for 11th position, and pulled away from the traffic jam. He overtook Frijns for tenth position two laps later. Buemi moved into fifth place after braking later than Abt on the inside for turn ten on lap seven. Vergne drafted Piquet on the start-finish straight and the latter locked his tyres with Vergne passing him on the inside at the first corner for third to start the ninth lap. Vergne immediately began to draw closer to Bird.

Abt fell to seventh when Prost overtook him at the first corner on lap ten; Abt defended from a large pack of cars. By the twelfth lap, Buemi had more electrical energy available and closed up to Piquet, overtaking him on the inside for fourth position at the seventh turn. Félix da Costa's vehicle stopped at turn eight on lap 12; the deployment of a full course yellow flag was avoided when he received radio instructions from his team to perform a full reset, allowing him to drive again. By then, he had dropped to the back of the field, and later became the race's first retiree. By the 14th lap, Rosenqvist led Bird by almost five seconds, but Vergne caught the latter by more than four-tenths of a second per lap. Although he had less electrical energy, Vergne caught Bird, (Vergne was backed into Buemi), and passed him for second at the start of the 15th lap with Bird not defending. The mandatory pit stops to change into a second car began on the next lap. When Rosenqvist and Vergne entered the pit lane Buemi and Bird elected to remain on the circuit for another lap. Buemi was running quicker and overtook Bird at turn eleven on lap 17. He braked late for turn eleven but avoided going off the circuit. Piquet was affected by an electrical problem, ending his chances of finishing in a points-scoring position. Engel stopped with electrical problems after his pit stop, curtailing his race. After the pit stops, Rosenqvist regained the lead, retaining much of his lead of four seconds over Vergne. Turvey had passed Di Grassi but the latter retook sixth place soon after and started to draw closer to teammate Abt.

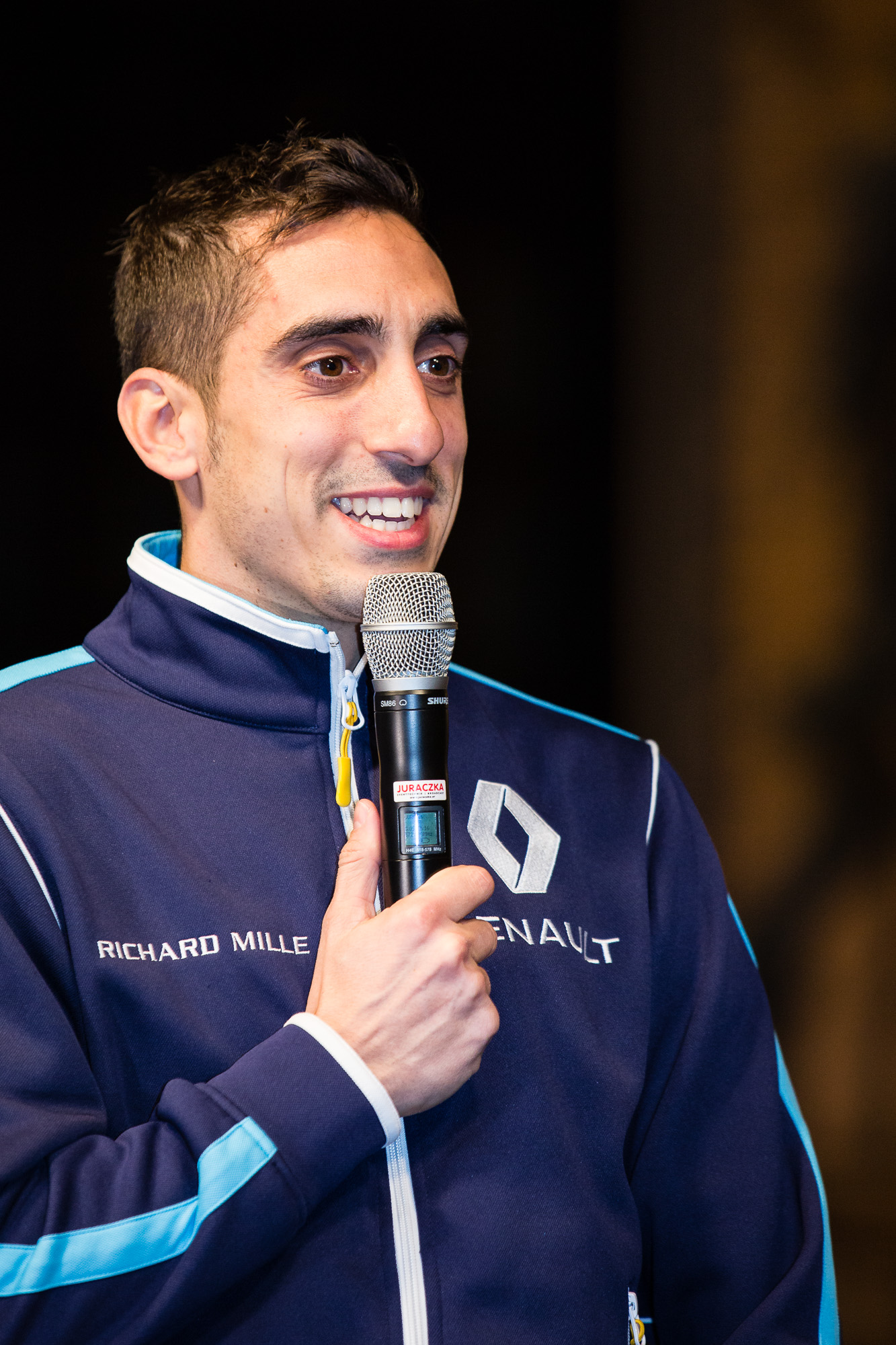
Sébastien Buemi took his second consecutive victory of the season and his eighth in Formula E.

On lap 20 it was announced that the stewards were investigating Vergne for speeding in the pit lane. They imposed a drive-through penalty on Vergne two laps later, ending his chances of battling for the victory. He fell to fifth place in front of both Audi Sport ABT cars but behind Prost, and Buemi inherited second place. Duval stopped on the track with powertrain problems on the 24th lap but he restarted his car and continued in 18th. Having made a pit stop a lap earlier than the rest of the field, Rosenqvist conserved electrical energy, allowing Buemi to close up to him by almost two seconds per lap because he used FanBoost, had more available electrical energy, and the requirement to lift and coast was minimal. Di Grassi overtook his teammate Abt for sixth at turn six on lap 27. Soon after, Buemi drafted Rosenqvist, braked late, and passed on the outside at turn eleven to take the lead. López passed Frijns for tenth place. Vergne attempted to pass Prost but could not do so, allowing di Grassi to close up. Vergne defended his position, but di Grassi passed him at turn seven for fifth.

Duval recorded the race's fastest lap of 1 minute, 22.600 seconds during the 30th lap, earning him one point. Rosenqvist slowed as he was struggling to conserve his battery's energy usage, allowing Bird to close up. Bird slipstreamed Rosenqvist and overtook him braking for second place at the eighth corner on lap 31. Rosenqvist continued to focus on preserving electrical energy to finish the event. On the final lap, after Piquet locked his brakes, Evans ran wide, drove off the circuit, and hit a trackside barrier; he was able to continue. Duval stopped his car for the second time on the same lap. Buemi held the lead to earn his second victory in succession and his eighth career win. Bird finished second, ahead of the third-placed Rosenqvist. Prost took fourth, with di Grassi fifth. Abt and Turvey overtook Vergne on the final lap for sixth and seventh. Heidfeld and López rounded out the top-ten points scoring positions. Frijns, Sarrazin, d'Ambrosio, Carroll, Ma, Piquet, Evans and Duval were the final classified finishers. There were four lead changes in the race; two drivers reached the front of the field. Rosenqvist's 26 laps led was the highest of any competitor. Buemi led twice for a total of seven laps.

=== Post-race ===
The top three drivers appeared on the podium to collect their trophies and spoke to the media in a later press conference. Buemi was delighted to take the victory, saying both his vehicles were "amazing" and cars' balance was "really good". He stated his team were aware that his car was efficient and needed to use this after starting the race in a position he was not expected to be in. Second-place finisher Bird said he was happy to score points in Marrakesh and felt being on the podium was like a victory. He revealed his car did not behave as well as Buemi's, or the third-position driver, after his second free practice crash and he struggled with its balance. Rosenqvist spoke of his shock and expectation at taking his first pole position and podium finish in his second Formula E event. He revealed his team had made the car for qualifying up to a good standard, were aware of its fast pace, and were feeling confident about next year's races.

Vergne argued that he could have won the race had he not been observed speeding in the pit lane which he attributed to a defective speed limit button. Describing the situation as "extremely frustrating" he said: "I was quicker than Rosenqvist and Buemi was quite far behind. Then the energy he would have spent to catch me, he would have had no extra energy to pass." Mahindra team principal Dilbagh Gill agreed that Buemi's presence would have delayed Vergne, or caused him to use more additional electrical energy. He said he felt Rosenqvist would have been able to fend off a challenge from Vergne. Engel was disappointed not to finish; he claimed he would have finished in the top-ten had problems not affected his car and revealed his team had changed his vehicle's battery in the morning: "Our race pace was strong and the energy management was good so I was looking forward to the second stint but it never really came." e.Dams-Renault team principal Jean-Paul Driot revealed that Buemi's five-place grid penalty had been a sporting regulation safety violation, which they had no control over. He spoke of his belief that two wires detached after Buemi ran over a kerb in qualifying.

The result increased Buemi's lead in the Drivers' Championship to 22 points in front of second-placed di Grassi, who in turn, was a further four points ahead of Prost in third position. Rosenqvist moved to fourth place on 19 points, with Bird fifth on 18. e.Dams-Renault's first and fourth-place finishes extended their Teams' Championship gap over Audi Sport ABT to 38 points, although the latter tied with Mahindra. Virgin moved into fourth, while Andretti fell to fifth with ten races left in the season.

=== Race classification ===
Drivers who scored championship points are denoted in bold.

Final race classification
Pos.	No.	Driver	Team	Laps	Gap/Retired	Grid	Points
1	**9**	**(Switzerland) Sébastien Buemi**	**e.Dams-Renault**	**33**	**47:40.840**	**7**	**25**
2	**2**	**(United Kingdom) Sam Bird**	**Virgin-Citroën**	**33**	**+2.457**	**2**	**18**
3	**19**	**(Sweden) Felix Rosenqvist**	**Mahindra**	**33**	**+7.195**	**1**	**15+3^{3}**
4	**8**	**(France) Nico Prost**	**e.Dams-Renault**	**33**	**+11.586**	**6**	**12**
5	**11**	**(Brazil) Lucas di Grassi**	**Audi Sport ABT**	**33**	**+13.771**	**12**	**10**
6	**66**	**(Germany) Daniel Abt**	**Audi Sport ABT**	**33**	**+18.233**	**5**	**8**
7	**88**	**(United Kingdom) Oliver Turvey**	**NextEV NIO**	**33**	**+21.710**	**8**	**6**
8	**25**	**(France) Jean-Éric Vergne**	**Techeetah-Renault**	**33**	**+28.011**	**4**	**4**
9	**23**	**(Germany) Nick Heidfeld**	**Mahindra**	**33**	**+33.699**	**11**	**2**
10	**37**	**(Argentina) José María López**	**Virgin-Citroën**	**33**	**+33.863**	**13**	**1**
11	27	(Netherlands) Robin Frijns	Andretti-BMW	33	+37.092	9	
12	4	(France) Stéphane Sarrazin	Venturi	33	+40.683	15	
13	7	(Belgium) Jérôme d'Ambrosio	Dragon-Penske	33	+42.034	17	
14	47	(United Kingdom) Adam Carroll	Jaguar	33	+49.026	20	
15	33	(China) Ma Qinghua	Techeetah-Renault	33	+50.433	18	
16	3	(Brazil) Nelson Piquet Jr.	NextEV NIO	33	+75.452	3	
17	20	(New Zealand) Mitch Evans	Jaguar	32	+1 Lap	16	
18	**6**	(France) **Loïc Duval**	**Dragon-Penske**	**30**	**Hydraulics**	**19**	**1**^{4}
Ret	5	(Germany) Maro Engel	Venturi	26	Electrical	14	
Ret	28	(Portugal) António Félix da Costa	Andretti-BMW	21	Battery	10	

Notes:

- **^3** — Three points for pole position.
- **^4** — One point for fastest lap.

== Standings after the race ==
Drivers' Championship standings

+/–	Pos	Driver	Points
	1	(Switzerland) Sébastien Buemi	50
	2	(Brazil) Lucas di Grassi	28 (−22)
1	3	(France) Nico Prost	24 (−26)
8	4	(Sweden) Felix Rosenqvist	19 (−31)
9	5	(United Kingdom) Sam Bird	18 (−32)

Teams' Championship standings

+/–	Pos	Constructor	Points
	1	(France) e.Dams-Renault	74
	2	(Germany) Audi Sport ABT	36 (−38)
	3	(India) Mahindra	36 (−38)
5	4	(United Kingdom) Virgin-Citroën	19 (−55)
2	5	(United States) Andretti-BMW	18 (−56)

- Notes: Only the top five positions are included for both sets of standings.

== See also ==
- FIA WTCC Race of Morocco

Previous race: 2016 Hong Kong ePrix	FIA Formula E Championship; 2016–17 season	Next race: 2017 Buenos Aires ePrix
Previous race: N/A	Marrakesh ePrix	Next race: 2018 Marrakesh ePrix
