= Circuit International Automobile Moulay El Hassan =

Motorsport venue in Morocco

- Semi-Permanent Circuit (2016–2022)

- Original Street Circuit (2009–2015)
- Location: Marrakesh, Morocco
- Coordinates: 31°35′11″N 7°59′10″W
- Capacity: 10,000
- FIA Grade: 2
- Operator: MGP (2009–present)
- Opened: 1 May 2009; 17 years ago
- Architect: D3 Motorsport Development
- Major events: Former: Formula E Marrakesh ePrix (2016, 2018–2020, 2022); FIA WTCR Race of Morocco (2009–2010, 2012–2019); TCR World Tour (2024); Auto GP (2012–2014); FIA Formula Two (2010)
- Website: https://www.marrakechgrandprix.com/

Permanent Circuit (2016–present)
- Surface: Asphalt
- Length: 1.701 km (1.057 mi)
- Turns: 11
- Race lap record: 0:50.613 ( (China) Ma Qinghua, Lynk & Co 03 FL TCR, 2024, TCR)

Semi-Permanent Circuit (2016–2022)
- Surface: Asphalt
- Length: 2.971 km (1.846 mi)
- Turns: 14
- Race lap record: 1:20.296 ( (Brazil) Lucas di Grassi, Audi e-tron FE05, 2019, F-E)

Original Street Circuit (2009–2015)
- Surface: Asphalt
- Length: 4.545 km (2.824 mi)
- Turns: 15
- Race lap record: 1:28.450 ( (India) Narain Karthikeyan, Lola B05/52, 2013, Auto GP)

The Circuit International Automobile Moulay El Hassan (also known as Marrakech Street Circuit and Marrakech Racetrack) is a semi-permanent street circuit in Agdal district, Marrakesh, Morocco. The circuit is operated by MGP. It has a capacity of 10,000 spectators.

== History ==
MGP's partner in Morocco, D3 Motorsport Development, was given the responsibility of the design of the street circuit. It is the same architect company that designed the Surfers Paradise Street Circuit in Australia. Groupe Menara oversaw the construction on the Route de l'Ourika/Boulevard Mohammed based track. The paddock had been paved alongside the walls of the Royal Garden and more than 2,500 concrete impact blocks and many debris fence panels had been put in place to bound the track.

The third round of the 2009 WTCC season was held there on 3 May 2009, becoming the first international car race in Morocco since the 1958 Moroccan Grand Prix at the Ain-Diab Circuit in Casablanca and the first event for the WTCC in Africa.

The original circuit had a very simple layout. It was a 4.545 km (2.824 mi) flat oval circuit with a hairpin at one end and chicanes punctuating the straights, running in an anticlockwise direction. In December 2015, it was announced the circuit would undergo a major overhaul to make it more challenging. Only half of the original circuit was utilized when the new layout came into effect for the 2016 FIA WTCC Race of Morocco.

== Events ==
Former

- Auto GP (2012–2014)
- FIA Formula Two (2010)
- Formula E
  - Marrakesh ePrix (2016, 2018–2020, 2022)
- TCR World Tour (2024)
- World Touring Car Championship
  - FIA WTCC Race of Morocco (2009–2010, 2012–2017)
- World Touring Car Cup
  - FIA WTCR Race of Morocco (2018–2019)

== Lap records ==
As of May 2024, the fastest official race lap records at the Circuit International Automobile Moulay El Hassan are listed as:

Category	Time	Driver	Vehicle	Event
Permanent Circuit (2016–present): 1.701 km (1.057 mi)
TCR Touring Car	0:50.613	Ma Qinghua	Lynk & Co 03 FL TCR	2024 Marrakesh TCR World Tour round
Semi-Permanent Circuit (2016–2022): 2.971 km (1.846 mi)
Formula E	1:20.296	Lucas di Grassi	Audi e-tron FE05	2019 Marrakesh ePrix
TC1	1:23.087	Hugo Valente	Lada Vesta WTCC	2016 FIA WTCC Race of Morocco
TCR Touring Car	1:26.150	Gabriele Tarquini	Hyundai i30 N TCR	2018 FIA WTCR Race of Morocco
Original Street Circuit (2009–2015): 4.545 km (2.824 mi)
Auto GP	1:28.450	Narain Karthikeyan	Lola B05/52	2013 Marrakech Auto GP round
F2 (2009–2012)	1:31.312	Dean Stoneman	Williams JPH1B	2010 Marrakech Formula Two round
TC1	1:43.480	José María López	Citroën C-Elysée WTCC	2015 FIA WTCC Race of Morocco
Super 2000	1:44.617	Pepe Oriola	SEAT León WTCC	2012 FIA WTCC Race of Morocco

== Results ==
=== Formula E ===
Year	Race	Driver	Team
2021-22	Marrakesh ePrix	(Switzerland) Edoardo Mortara	(Monaco) Venturi Racing
2019-20	Marrakesh ePrix	(Portugal) António Félix da Costa	(China) Techeetah
2018-19	Marrakesh ePrix	(Belgium) Jerome D'Ambrosio	(India) Mahindra Racing
2017-18	Marrakesh ePrix	(Switzerland) Felix Rosenqvist	(India) Mahindra Racing
2016-17	Marrakesh ePrix	(Switzerland) Sébastien Buemi	(France) Renault e.dams

=== WTCR ===
Year	Race	Driver	Manufacturer	Report
2019	Race 1	(Argentina) Esteban Guerrieri	(Japan) Honda	Report
2019	Race 2	(Italy) Gabriele Tarquini	(South Korea) Hyundai	Report
2019	Race 3	(Sweden) Thed Björk	(China) (Sweden) Lynk & Co	Report
2018	Race 1	(Italy) Gabriele Tarquini	(South Korea) Hyundai	Report
2018	Race 2	(France) Jean Karl Vernay	(Germany) Audi	Report
2018	Race 3	(Italy) Gabriele Tarquini	(South Korea) Hyundai	Report

=== WTCC ===
Year	Race	Driver	Manufacturer	Report
2017	Race 1	(Argentina) Esteban Guerrieri	(United States) Chevrolet	Report
2017	Race 2	(Portugal) Tiago Monteiro	(Japan) Honda	Report
2016	Race 1	(Netherlands) Tom Coronel	(United States) Chevrolet	Report
2016	Race 2	(Argentina) José María López	(France) Citroën	Report
2015	Race 1	(Argentina) José María López	(France) Citroën	Report
2015	Race 2	(France) Yvan Muller	(France) Citroën	Report
2014	Race 1	(Argentina) José María López	(France) Citroën	Report
2014	Race 2	(France) Sébastien Loeb	(France) Citroën	Report
2013	Race 1	(Denmark) Michel Nykjær	(United States) Chevrolet	Report
2013	Race 2	(Spain) Pepe Oriola	(Spain) SEAT	Report
2012	Race 1	(Switzerland) Alain Menu	(United States) Chevrolet	Report
2012	Race 2	(France) Yvan Muller	(United States) Chevrolet	Report
2010	Race 1	(Italy) Gabriele Tarquini	(Spain) SEAT	Report
2010	Race 2	(United Kingdom) Andy Priaulx	(Germany) BMW	Report
2009	Race 1	(United Kingdom) Robert Huff	(United States) Chevrolet	Report
2009	Race 2	(Italy) Nicola Larini	(United States) Chevrolet	Report

=== AutoGP ===
Year	Race	Driver	Team
2014	Race 1	(Japan) Kimiya Sato	(Italy) Euronova Racing
2014	Race 2	(Germany) Markus Pommer	(United Kingdom) Super Nova International
2013	Race 1	(Italy) Sergio Campana	(Spain) Ibiza Racing Team
2013	Race 2	(United Kingdom) Luciano Bacheta	(Austria) Zele Racing
2012	Race 1	(Italy) Sergio Campana	(Italy) Team MLR71
2012	Race 2	(New Zealand) Chris van der Drift	(Netherlands) Manor MP Motorsport

== Future developments ==
Formula 1 will potentially come to Morocco. Stefano Domenicali, CEO of the Formula 1 Group, has revealed ongoing discussions to host a Grand Prix event in Africa, pinpointing North Africa and South Africa, alongside considerations for two countries in the Far East. Morocco emerges as a frontrunner in this expansion strategy, given its historical ties to Formula 1 and its fusion of rich cultural heritage with captivating urban landscapes. This move marks a significant step in Formula 1's global outreach, promising to blend the thrill of racing with Morocco's scenic beauty and cultural depth.
