= Marrakesh ePrix =

Electric motorsport race

- Circuit International Automobile Moulay El Hassan

Race information
- Number of times held: 5
- First held: 2016
- Last held: 2022
- Most wins (constructors): (India) Mahindra (2)
- Circuit length: 2.971 km (1.846 miles)
- Laps: 34

Last race (2022)

Pole position
- (Portugal) António Félix da Costa; Techeetah-DS; 1:17.010

Podium
- 1. (Switzerland) E. Mortara; Venturi-Mercedes; 46:45.410; 2. (Portugal) A. Félix da Costa; Techeetah-DS; +2.297; 3. (New Zealand) M. Evans; Jaguar; +6.270

Fastest lap
- (Brazil) Lucas di Grassi; Venturi-Mercedes; 1:20.909

The Marrakesh ePrix was an annual race of the single-seater, electrically powered Formula E championship, held in Marrakesh, Morocco. It was first raced in the 2016–17 season.

== Circuit ==
The Marrakesh ePrix was held on the temporary Circuit International Automobile Moulay El Hassan. It was located in the Agdal district of Marrakech. The track is 2.971 km (1.846 mi) in length and features 14 turns.

== Results ==
| Edition | Track | Winner | Second | Third | Pole position | Fastest lap | Ref |
|---|---|---|---|---|---|---|---|
| 2016 | Circuit International Automobile Moulay El Hassan | (Switzerland) Sébastien Buemi e.dams-Renault | (United Kingdom) Sam Bird; Virgin-Citroën | (Sweden) Felix Rosenqvist; Mahindra | (Sweden) Felix Rosenqvist; Mahindra | (France) Loïc Duval; Dragon-Penske | |
| 2018 | Circuit International Automobile Moulay El Hassan | (Sweden) Felix Rosenqvist; Mahindra | (Switzerland) Sébastien Buemi e.dams-Renault | (United Kingdom) Sam Bird; Virgin-Citroën | (Switzerland) Sébastien Buemi e.dams-Renault | (Brazil) Nelson Piquet Jr. Jaguar | |
| 2019 | Circuit International Automobile Moulay El Hassan | (Belgium) Jérôme d'Ambrosio; Mahindra | (Netherlands) Robin Frijns; Virgin-Audi | (United Kingdom) Sam Bird; Virgin-Audi | (United Kingdom) Sam Bird; Virgin-Audi | (Brazil) Lucas di Grassi; Audi | |
| 2020 | Circuit International Automobile Moulay El Hassan | (Portugal) António Félix da Costa; Techeetah-DS | (Germany) Maximilian Günther; Andretti-BMW | (France) Jean-Éric Vergne; Techeetah-DS | (Portugal) António Félix da Costa; Techeetah-DS | (Germany) Pascal Wehrlein; Mahindra | |
| 2022 | Circuit International Automobile Moulay El Hassan | (Switzerland) Edoardo Mortara; Venturi-Mercedes | (Portugal) António Félix da Costa; Techeetah-DS | (New Zealand) Mitch Evans; Jaguar | (Portugal) António Félix da Costa; Techeetah-DS | (Brazil) Lucas di Grassi; Venturi-Mercedes | |
