= Agdal =

Agdal (Berber languages: ⴰⴳⴷⴰⵍ; Moroccan Arabic: أݣدال) is a historical concept in Morocco, referring to gardens or farmland owned by the Makhzen or the community, and forbidden to the public, whether permanently or during certain periods. Nowadays, the name is used for areas in some Moroccan cities such as Rabat, Fez, Marrakesh and Meknes, which had historically been protected gardens, going back at least to the Almohad era in the 12th century.

The word Agdal comes from Amazigh language, and means either "garden" or "protected grazing land", usually surrounded by a fence and forbidden to the public. Many places called "Agdal" today, especially within urban areas, were originally grazing lands for government-owned horses. In general, the term "Agdal" has the connotation of something private or forbidden.

== Agdals in Morocco ==
- Agdal, an urban community in Rabat
- Agdal Gardens, a garden area in Marrakesh
- Agdal, an urban community in Fez
- Agdal, an urban community in Meknes
