= Spark SRT05e =

Electric formula race car designed for use in the FIA Formula E Championship

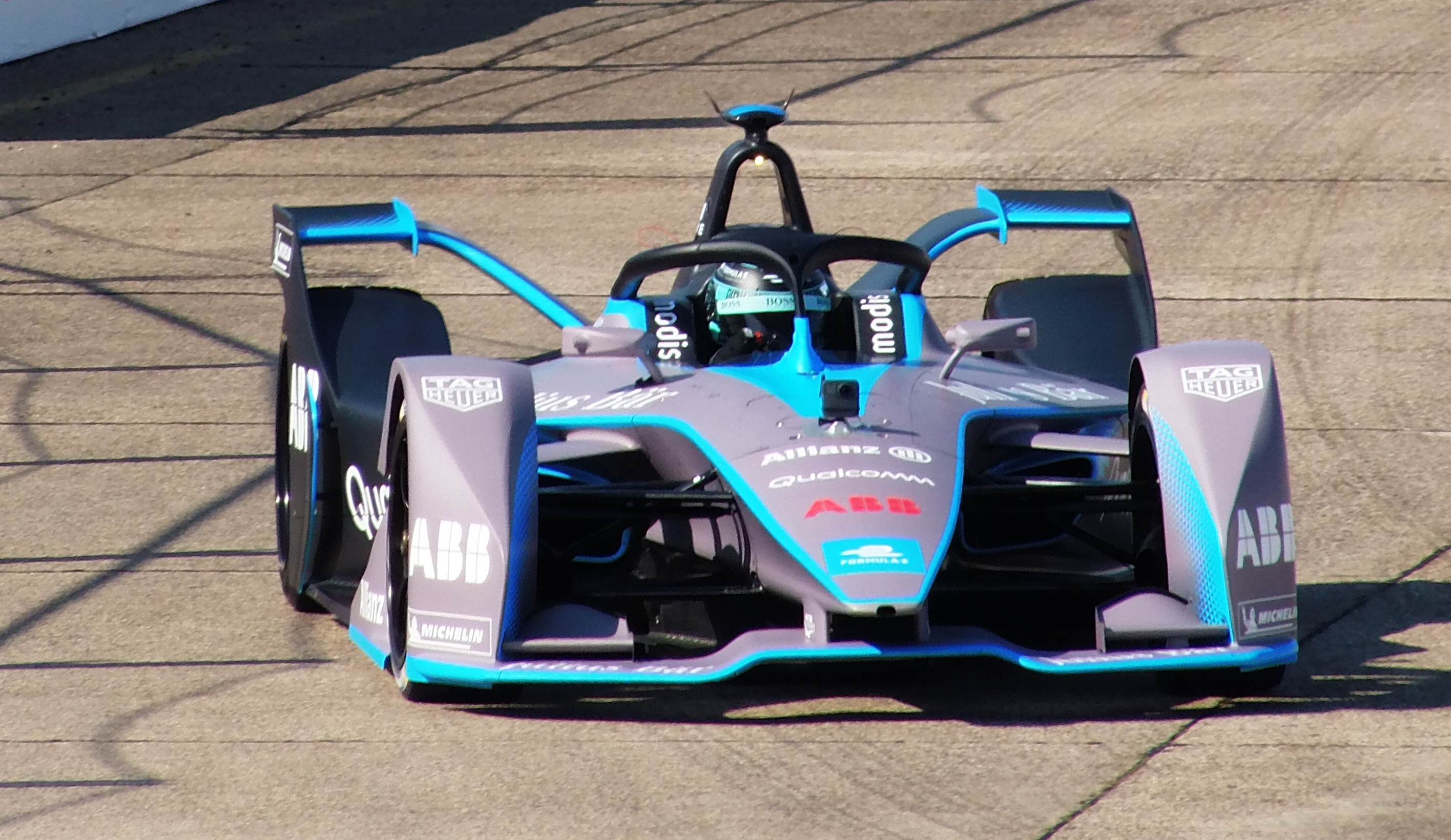
- Nico Rosberg driving the Gen2 at a 2018 Berlin ePrix demo
- Category: FIA Formula E Championship
- Constructor: Spark Racing Technology; Dallara
- Designer: Théophile Gouzin (Technical Director)
- Predecessor: SRT01-e
- Successor: Gen3

Technical specifications
- Chassis: Carbon fibre and aluminium monocoque
- Length: 5160mm
- Width: 1770mm
- Height: 1050mm
- Axle track: Front: 1553mm Rear: 1505mm
- Wheelbase: 3100mm
- Electric motor: Various mid-mounted
- Transmission: Various unknown
- Battery: 54kW⋅h (194 MJ) by McLaren Applied Technologies
- Power: Max: 250 kW (335 hp; 340 PS); Race: 200 kW (268 hp; 272 PS)
- Weight: 900kg (FIA minimum); Battery: 385kg
- Brakes: Front: 278mm Brembo Carbon Disks & Callipers; Rear: 263mm Brembo Carbon Disks & Callipers with Brake-By-Wire
- Tyres: Michelin Pilot Sport All-Weather Treaded (18-inch (46 cm) wheel diameter)

Competition history
- Notable entrants: (France) Nissan e.dams (China) DS Techeetah (Germany) Audi Sport ABT Schaeffler (Germany) HWA Racelab (Germany) TAG Heuer Porsche (United States) BMW i Andretti Motorsport (United Kingdom) Jaguar Racing (United Kingdom) NIO Formula E Team (United Kingdom) Envision Virgin Racing (United States) GEOX Dragon (Monaco) Venturi Formula E Team (India) Mahindra Racing (Germany) Mercedes-Benz EQ

The Spark SRT05E, also known as the Spark Gen2 (or the Spark Gen2EVO for the unreleased upgraded chassis that was set to be introduced in the 2020–21 season but eventually cancelled) was an electric formula race car designed for use in the FIA Formula E Championship. The car was the successor to the SRT01-e, and was constructed by Spark Racing Technology with assistance from Dallara. It was used as the base car for all manufacturers and teams from the 2018-2019 FIA Formula E Championship. The car featured a new 56 kW⋅h (202 MJ) battery from McLaren Applied Technologies, alongside the Halo cockpit protection system, and was the first Formula E car capable of completing a full-race distance.

== Development ==
=== Initial development ===
On 28 September 2016, McLaren Applied Technologies was announced to have won the tender to exclusively supply batteries for the Gen2 car. Initially, the tender called for the battery to be supplied for two seasons, before it was announced subsequently that battery development would only be opened up for the 3rd Generation car, to reduce development costs for teams.

On 9 January 2017, Spark Racing Technology was announced to have won the tender to supply chassis for the 2nd Generation Formula E Car. On 12 February 2017, concept images of the 2nd Generation Formula E car were released.

In September 2017, the SRT05e had its first shakedown run, held in secret at the Circuit Ecuyers, in Reims, France, with Anthoine Hubert at the wheel. The shakedown was used to evaluate the performance of the new battery, with the car completing over 400 km, but running without the Halo driver protection device, or fully installed bodywork.

In October 2017, the SRT05e successfully completed its first endurance tests held across three days, at the Monteblanco Circuit in Spain, once again, without the halo cockpit protection system, but with the full bodywork of the car installed. Four full-race simulations were also conducted across the three days, with Anthoine Hubert and Frederic Makowiecki at the wheel of the car.

On 1 December 2017, the FIA, as well as Formula E Holdings announced via Press Release, that they would renew their exclusive partnership with Michelin to supply tyres for the Championship until 2021.

On 30 January 2018, the SRT05e was revealed online with a series of computer generated images. The launch date for the car was also set at 6 March, at the Geneva International Motor show.

On 6 March 2018, the SRT05e was launched at the Geneva International Motor show by FIA President Jean Todt, as well as Formula E Holdings CEO Alejandro Agag. The car was also revealed to be the first-ever race car to be fully conceived and project-led by the FIA, with the FIA organising the concept from design, through manufacture.

The first manufacturer group test took place, behind closed doors at the Monteblanco Circuit in Spain from 28 to 30 March 2018. The track was modified to include two specially-inserted temporary chicanes, on the front and back straight, with lap times estimated to be around the 1:01 mark. On the first day of testing alone, 2000 km of running was achieved among the teams.

=== Gen2EVO ===
It was later confirmed on 18 January 2019, that similar to its predecessor, the SRT01-e, the SRT05e would also undergo a bodywork update ahead of its intended 3rd season of competition, the 2020–21 season, while the car would also see its use extended until the 2021–22 season.

Subsequently, the Gen2 car was found to be much stronger than the original SRT01-e car, leading to the drivers becoming more aggressive and making contact with each other. As a result, a car redesign was proposed, with the newer front of the car made more fragile, in a bid to punish drivers for making excessive contact.

On 4 February 2020, Formula E unveiled the new design, named Gen2EVO. Owing to the COVID-19 pandemic, a raft of emergency technical measures saw the Gen2EVO's debut delayed to the 2021-22 season.

It was subsequently reported the introduction of the Gen2EVO bodywork update could be entirely scrapped on 11 May 2020. The cancellation of the Gen2EVO bodywork update was confirmed on 19 August 2020, as Formula E was set to introduce its Gen 3 car for the 2022–23 season; running the bodywork update for only a single season was deemed uneconomical.

== Technology ==
=== Electric motors ===
Teams are able to use their own electric motor designs homologated by the FIA regulations, or may procure one from an existing manufacturer with an FIA-homologated design, at a cost of no more than €250,000.

=== Charging ===
Charging is done by the teams before the race.

=== Tyres ===
The cars are shod with 18in (47 cm) Michelin Pilot Sport All-Weather tyres, which are expected to last a whole race weekend, with one set of tyres per car. Compared to the tyres on the previous car, the tyres are 2 kg lighter at the front and 2.5 kg lighter at the rear, for a total weight reduction of 9 kg, excluding other factors.
