= 2019 Monaco ePrix =

Formula E electric car race

Race 9 of 13 of the 2018–19 Formula E season
← Previous race	Next race →
- Layout of the Monaco Formula E street circuit

Race details
- Date: 11 May 2019
- Official name: 2019 Monaco E-Prix
- Location: Circuit de Monaco, Monte Carlo, Monaco
- Course: Street circuit
- Course length: 1.765 km (1.097 miles)
- Distance: 51 laps, 90.018 km (55.935 miles)
- Weather: Sunny; Air: 18.1 to 17.8 °C (64.6 to 64.0 °F); Track: 24.9 to 22.8 °C (76.8 to 73.0 °F)

Pole position
Driver	(United Kingdom) Oliver Rowland (Note: Oliver Rowland set the fastest time and received three points for pole position but had a three-place grid penalty for colliding with Alexander Sims in the Paris ePrix. He was considered as the pole sitter, although he started in third place and Jean-Éric Vergne started in the first place.)	e.Dams-Nissan
- Time: 50.021

Fastest lap
Driver	(Germany) Pascal Wehrlein	Mahindra
- Time: 52.385 on lap 46

Podium
First	(France) Jean-Éric Vergne	Techeetah-DS
Second	(United Kingdom) Oliver Rowland	e.Dams-Nissan
Third	(Brazil) Felipe Massa	Venturi

The 2019 Monaco ePrix was a Formula E electric car race held at the Circuit de Monaco on 11 May 2019. It was the ninth race of the 2018–19 Formula E season and the third edition of the event.

== Report ==
=== Background ===
The Monaco ePrix was confirmed to be returning to the Formula E calendar on 4 November 2018. The previous edition was in 2017 as the event was held biennially, alternating with the Historic Grand Prix of Monaco. Originally, series founder and CEO Alejandro Agag had wanted to upgrade to using the full size Circuit de Monaco instead of the shorter version used in 2017 and 2015 centred around the Rainier III Nautical Stadium. However, plans for this fell through when the FIA objected to it in September 2018.

Going into the weekend, Virgin Racing's Robin Frijns lead the championship with 81 points, a 1 point lead over Techeetah's André Lotterer with BMW Andretti's António Félix da Costa down in 3rd with 70 points. In the team's standings, Techeetah lead with 142 points followed behind by Envision Virgin with 135 and defending constructors champions, Audi Sport Abt Schaeffler down in 3rd with 129.

After the previous round in Paris, three drivers were left with three place grid penalties for qualifying for causing collisions. They were Jerome D'Ambrosio who collided with Frijns's team mate Sam Bird, Edoardo Mortara who collided with Jaguar's Alex Lynn and Oliver Rowland who collided with Alexander Sims.

== Classification ==
=== Qualifying ===
Pos.	No.	Driver	Team	Time	Gap	Grid
1	22	(United Kingdom) Oliver Rowland	e.Dams-Nissan	50.021	–	3^{1}^{,}^{2}
2	25	(France) Jean-Éric Vergne	Techeetah-DS	50.042	+0.021	1
3	20	(New Zealand) Mitch Evans	Jaguar	50.112	+0.091	12^{3}
4	94	(Germany) Pascal Wehrlein	Mahindra	50.128	+0.107	2
5	19	(Brazil) Felipe Massa	Venturi	50.218	+0.197	4
6	23	(Switzerland) Sébastien Buemi	e.Dams-Nissan	50.234	+0.213	5
7	27	(United Kingdom) Alexander Sims	Andretti-BMW	50.351	–	6
8	3	(United Kingdom) Alex Lynn	Jaguar	50.370	+0.019	7
9	28	(Portugal) António Félix da Costa	Andretti-BMW	50.375	+0.024	8
10	7	(Argentina) José María López	Dragon-Penske	50.432	+0.081	9
11	5	(Belgium) Stoffel Vandoorne	HWA-Venturi	50.451	+0.100	10
12	4	(Netherlands) Robin Frijns	Virgin-Audi	50.498	+0.147	11
13	11	(Brazil) Lucas di Grassi	Audi	50.502	+0.151	13
14	6	(Germany) Maximilian Günther	Dragon-Penske	50.514	+0.163	22^{4}
15	2	(United Kingdom) Sam Bird	Virgin-Audi	50.526	+0.175	14
16	16	(United Kingdom) Oliver Turvey	NIO	50.578	+0.227	15
17	64	(Belgium) Jérôme d'Ambrosio	Mahindra	50.601	+0.250	19^{2}
18	66	(Germany) Daniel Abt	Audi	50.602	+0.251	16
19	48	(Switzerland) Edoardo Mortara	Venturi	50.618	+0.267	21^{2}
20	17	(United Kingdom) Gary Paffett	HWA-Venturi	50.664	+0.313	17
21	8	(France) Tom Dillmann	NIO	50.811	+0.460	18
22	36	(Germany) André Lotterer	Techeetah-DS	51.018	+0.667	20

Notes:

- ^1 – Oliver Rowland set the fastest time and received three points for pole position but received a three-place grid penalty for colliding with Alexander Sims in the Paris ePrix. Therefore, he started in third place and Jean-Éric Vergne started in first place.
- ^2 – Oliver Rowland, Jérôme d'Ambrosio and Edoardo Mortara received three place grid penalties for causing a collision in the previous race in Paris
- ^3 – Mitch Evans received a 10-place grid penalty after a qualifying infringement and reached his third reprimand.
- ^4 – Maximilian Günther received a 10-place grid penalty after speeding under Full Course Yellow during FP1 and reached his third reprimand.

=== Race ===
Pos.	No.	Driver	Team	Laps	Time/Retired	Grid	Points
1	25	(France) Jean-Éric Vergne	Techeetah-DS	51	46:05.547	1	25
2	22	(United Kingdom) Oliver Rowland	e.Dams-Nissan	51	+0.201	3	18+3^{3}
3	19	(Brazil) Felipe Massa	Venturi	51	+1.261	4	15
4	94	(Germany) Pascal Wehrlein	Mahindra	51	+1.439	2	12+1^{4}
5	23	(Switzerland) Sébastien Buemi	e.Dams-Nissan	51	+6.215	5	10
6	20	(New Zealand) Mitch Evans	Jaguar	51	+16.213	12	8
7	36	(Germany) André Lotterer	Techeetah-DS	51	+16.848	20	6
8	3	(United Kingdom) Alex Lynn	Jaguar	51	+18.112	7	4
9	5	(Belgium) Stoffel Vandoorne	HWA-Venturi	51	+18.551	10	2
10	7	(Argentina) José María López	Dragon-Penske	51	+18.860	9	1
11	64	(Belgium) Jérôme d'Ambrosio	Mahindra	51	+21.488	19	
12	17	(United Kingdom) Gary Paffett	HWA-Venturi	51	+21.853	17	
13	27	(United Kingdom) Alexander Sims	Andretti-BMW	51	+26.934	6	
14	8	(France) Tom Dillmann	NIO	51	+31.861	18	
15	66	(Germany) Daniel Abt	Audi	51	+49.400^{1}	16	
16	2	(United Kingdom) Sam Bird	Virgin-Audi	50	Puncture	14	
17	4	(Netherlands) Robin Frijns	Virgin-Audi	46	Collision	11	
Ret	16	(United Kingdom) Oliver Turvey	NIO	32	Collision	15	
Ret	11	(Brazil) Lucas di Grassi	Audi	31	Collision	13	
Ret	48	(Switzerland) Edoardo Mortara	Venturi	29	Technical	21	
Ret	6	(Germany) Maximilian Günther	Dragon-Penske	29	Accident	22	
DSQ	28	(Portugal) António Félix da Costa	Andretti-BMW	51	Power usage^{2}	8	

Notes:

- ^1 – Daniel Abt received a drive through penalty converted into a 33-second time penalty for causing a collision.
- ^2 – António Félix da Costa originally finished sixth, but was disqualified for exceeding power usage over 200kW.
- ^3 – Pole position.
- ^4 – Fastest lap.

== Standings after the race ==
Drivers' Championship standings

+/–	Pos	Driver	Points
5	1	(France) Jean-Éric Vergne	87
	2	(Germany) André Lotterer	86
2	3	(Netherlands) Robin Frijns	81
1	4	(Portugal) António Félix da Costa	70
1	5	(Brazil) Lucas di Grassi	70

Teams' Championship standings

+/–	Pos	Constructor	Points
	1	(China) DS Techeetah	173
	2	(United Kingdom) Virgin-Audi	135
	3	(Germany) Audi Sport ABT Schaeffler	129
	4	(India) Mahindra	116
2	5	(France) e.Dams-Nissan	99

- Notes: Only the top five positions are included for both sets of standings.

== Notes ==
Previous race: 2019 Paris ePrix	FIA Formula E Championship; 2018–19 season	Next race: 2019 Berlin ePrix
Previous race: 2017 Monaco ePrix	Monaco ePrix	Next race: 2021 Monaco ePrix
