= 2019 Swiss ePrix =

Race 11 of 13 of the 2018–19 Formula E season
← Previous race	Next race →

Race details
- Date: 22 June 2019
- Official name: 2019 Julius Baer Swiss E-Prix
- Location: Bern Street Circuit, Bern
- Course: Street circuit
- Course length: 2.668 kilometres (1.658 mi)
- Distance: 31 laps, 82.708 kilometres (51.392 mi)
- Weather: Sunny to light rain

Pole position
Driver	(France) Jean-Éric Vergne	Techeetah-DS
- Time: 1:18.813

Fastest lap
Driver	(Portugal) António Félix da Costa	Andretti-BMW
- Time: 1:21.240 on lap 27

Podium
First	(France) Jean-Éric Vergne	Techeetah-DS
Second	(New Zealand) Mitch Evans	Jaguar
Third	(Switzerland) Sébastien Buemi	e.Dams-Nissan

The 2019 Swiss ePrix (formally the 2019 Julius Baer Swiss E-Prix) was a Formula E electric car race on the streets of Bern, Switzerland, on 22 June 2019. It was the eleventh round of the 2018–19 Formula E Championship, and was the first and only running of the Swiss ePrix, which was the second Formula E race held in Switzerland, after the Zürich ePrix in 2018. The race was won by Techeetah driver Jean-Éric Vergne after starting from pole position and leading all 31-laps. Jaguar driver Mitch Evans finished a close second, ahead of Swiss driver Sébastien Buemi who finished third for the Nissan e.Dams team.

The race was halted by a red flag on the first lap following a collision involving several cars that blocked the track. After a 40-minute delay, the race was restarted with drivers reordered back to their starting positions. These position changes led to complaints by several of the drivers who had gained positions during the first lap. Envision Virgin Racing driver Robin Frijns was the only driver who was unable to restart the race due to car damage suffered in the first lap crash.

The majority of the race was held under dry conditions until the final two laps, when a heavy rain shower brought treacherous conditions to the circuit. The change in weather allowed Evans to close the gap to Vergne and stay with him to the checkered flag, but Vergne was able to hold on, ultimately crossing the line just 0.160 seconds ahead of Evans.

The consequence of the final positions meant that Jean-Éric Vergne was able to expand his lead in the Drivers' Championship by 32-points over championship rival Lucas di Grassi who finished ninth. The strong result for Mitch Evans moved him from sixth to third in the standings. Techeetahs' victory meant that they were able to extend their lead in the Teams' Championship by 43 points over Audi, while Virgin maintained third place with two races remaining at the double-header in New York.

== Background ==
As the season comes to a close, Formula E returned to Switzerland at the Bern Street Circuit. With 14 corners, It was the second longest track Formula E had raced on, after the Brooklyn Street Circuit in New York. It was challenging for the drivers including the tricky chicane at turns 12, 13 and 14.

=== Preparations ===
In 2018, it was announced that Bern would host a round of the 2018-19 Formula E Championship. The Swiss ePrix was added as a replacement for the Zürich ePrix, which had debuted in 2018. The city of Zürich was unable to host the race again in 2019 due to other events happening that summer.

A few days before the race, there was an environmental protest against the race being held. The largely peaceful protest involved several hundred protesters riding bicycles around the circuit. The protest was to raise awareness to the environmental damage caused by the trucks traveling to set up the race, as well as all the spectators who were expected to driving to the city to watch the race.

Later, organizers of the race filed a criminal complaint against several protesters who allegedly vandalized the circuit. The complaint estimated that protesters caused over $400,000 in damages, which included cut TV cables, and damaged sponsorship banners that were hung around the track.

=== Circuit ===
The temporary 2.750 km Bern Street Circuit was made up of city streets in the de facto capital of Switzerland. The 14-turn track wound through the Old Town portion of the city, past Rosengarten park and the Bärengraben (bear-pit). The narrow track was noted for its elevation changes, with almost the entire track being on an incline or decline. Jaguar Racing driver Mitch Evans said ahead of the race that he thought it was "...a real, hardcore street circuit...I think it's going to be a complete roller coaster." Other challenges of the circuit that drivers noted include variations in the tarmac surface and road camber, as well as several sharp corners and chicanes. Additionally, several drivers remarked about narrowness of the circuit, and the difficulty for overtaking. The combination of steep hills, sharp corners, and length (Bern was the second-longest track on the 2018–19 calendar) meant that managing energy with the regenerative braking would be a real test for the drivers. The confined spaces in the old city also added logistical challenges for the teams. The indoor paddock area, where teams prepare the cars before the race, was located 800 meters away from the pit lane. The Attack Mode activation zone was located off the racing line between turns 8 and 9, and had to be used twice during the race by each driver.

The Bern Street Circuit is the only circuit on the Formula E calendar that necessitates an uphill start (Laubeggstrasse), and features turns and roads with uneven camber from left to right, the steepest downhill section on the entire calendar (Aargauerstalden and Schosshaldenstrasse), as well as a live bear pit, though the bears would be absent during race time.

=== Preview ===
Going into the race weekend, Jean-Éric Vergne was leading the drivers' championship by just six points ahead of Audi driver Lucas di Grassi. di Grassi had moved into second place in the championship after winning the previous race in Berlin, and putting him ten points clear of Vergnes' Techeetah teammate, André Lotterer. Just 21 points separated the top five drivers in the championship, including Vergne, di Grassi, and Lotterer, as well as BMW driver António Félix da Costa and Robin Frijns for Envision Virgin Racing. Of these, all but Lotterer had won a race that season. In the teams' championship, Techeetah was leading the 2017-18 champions Audi, who had overtaken Envision Virgin Racing for second place in the championship.

== Practice and qualifying ==
The Friday shakedown session, which allows drivers to get a feel for the track at a lower power level, was delayed after the track construction was not finished on time. The shakedown time was also reduced to fifteen minutes. The race officials decided to give more time to construction crews to work on installing the track barriers and catch fencing.

The first practice session was held Saturday morning under overcast conditions, with the Audi drivers of Lucas di Grassi and Daniel Abt being the first out on track. As the session progressed, the lap times improved as drivers become more comfortable on the circuit. Ultimately Jean-Éric Vergne was able to set the fastest time of 1:19.281, just 0.111 seconds ahead of his teammate, André Lotterer. Lucas di Grassi, Robin Frijns, and Mitch Evans rounded out the top five. During the second free practice session, several drivers had difficulty with track limits, with Gary Paffett, Maximilian Günther, and Tom Dillmann all taking to the escape road (the latter two were investigated by race officials). In the end, Mahindra driver Pascal Wehrlein was able to set the fastest time of 1:19.118, with both Techeetah drivers, Lotterer and Vergne, finishing the session in second and third respectively.

Qualifying got underway Saturday afternoon with the group stages in dry, overcast conditions. Jaguar Racings' Mitch Evans set the fastest overall time with a lap of 1:18.897. Along with Evans, Techeetahs' Jean-Éric Vergne, Mahindras' Pascal Wehrlein, Sébastien Buemi for Nissan e.Dams, Maximilian Günther in the Geox Dragon Racing, and Envision Virgin Racings' Sam Bird all set the top times in their respective groups, thereby advancing to the Super Pole shoot-out.

Audi driver Daniel Abt qualified seventh, having missed out on advancing to the shoot-out by just 0.119 seconds. He was ahead of championship contenders André Lotterer of Techeetah and Envision Virgin Racings' Robin Frijns who were unable to make it out of their group, and started eighth and ninth respectively. Jaguar driver Alex Lynn was just a tenth of a second behind Frijns, and would round out the top ten on the grid.

Mahindra Racings' Jérôme d'Ambrosio started eleventh, ahead of the Venturi of Felipe Massa, and Oliver Rowland in the Nissan e.dams who started thirteenth. Next was the Geox Dragon of José María López in fourteenth, who started ahead of the HWA teammates of Stoffel Vandoorne and Gary Paffett in fifteenth and sixteenth. Alexander Sims in the BMW Andretti car was seventeenth, ahead of Swiss driver Edoardo Mortara for Venturi. Two of the championship contenders had disappointing qualifying laps, with second placed Audi driver Lucas di Grassi managing only to go nineteenth fastest, while António Félix da Costa, who went into the weekend in fourth, started twentieth in the BMW i Andretti. The NIO drivers of Tom Dillmann and Oliver Turvey qualified at the back of the grid, in twenty-first and twenty-second respectively.

During the Super Pole shoot-out to determine the top six starting places, Vergne was able to set the fastest time of 1:18.813 seconds, allowing him to take his first pole position of the season. Mitch Evans clipped the wall during his lap and ended up behind Vergne by just 0.307 seconds, but was still fast enough to prevent Swiss driver Sébastien Buemi from getting a front row starting position at his home race. Buemis' time of 1:19.164 just 0.004 seconds ahead of fourth place Wehrlein with a time of 1:19.168. Maximilian Günther was able to start fifth with a time of 1:19.371, equaling his best qualifying result of the season, while Sam Bird rounded out the top six with a time of 1:19.536. In addition to starting the race from the front of the grid, Vergne was also awarded three championship points, which put him nine points ahead of Lucas di Grassi in the drivers' championship.

=== Qualifying classification ===
Pos.	No.	Driver	Team	Time	Gap	Grid
1	25	(France) Jean-Éric Vergne	Techeetah-DS	1:18.813	–	1
2	20	(New Zealand) Mitch Evans	Jaguar	1:19.120	+0.307	2
3	23	(Switzerland) Sébastien Buemi	e.Dams-Nissan	1:19.164	+0.351	3
4	94	(Germany) Pascal Wehrlein	Mahindra	1:19.168	+0.355	4
5	6	(Germany) Maximilian Günther	Dragon-Penske	1:19.371	+0.558	5
6	2	(United Kingdom) Sam Bird	Virgin-Audi	1:19.536	+0.723	6
7	66	(Germany) Daniel Abt	Audi	1:19.554	–	7
8	36	(Germany) André Lotterer	Techeetah-DS	1:19.585	+0.031	8
9	4	(Netherlands) Robin Frijns	Virgin-Audi	1:19.591	+0.037	9
10	3	(United Kingdom) Alex Lynn	Jaguar	1:19.608	+0.054	10
11	64	(Belgium) Jérôme d'Ambrosio	Mahindra	1:19.613	+0.059	11
12	19	(Brazil) Felipe Massa	Venturi	1:19.638	+0.084	12
13	22	(United Kingdom) Oliver Rowland	e.Dams-Nissan	1:19.670	+0.116	13
14	7	(Argentina) José María López	Dragon-Penske	1:19.714	+0.160	14
15	5	(Belgium) Stoffel Vandoorne	HWA-Venturi	1:19.719	+0.165	15
16	17	(United Kingdom) Gary Paffett	HWA-Venturi	1:19.804	+0.250	16
17	27	(United Kingdom) Alexander Sims	Andretti-BMW	1:19.908	+0.354	17
18	48	(Switzerland) Edoardo Mortara	Venturi	1:20.023	+0.469	18
19	11	(Brazil) Lucas di Grassi	Audi	1:20.034	+0.480	19
20	28	(Portugal) António Félix da Costa	Andretti-BMW	1:20.081	+0.527	20
21	8	(France) Tom Dillmann	NIO	1:20.506	+0.952	21
22	16	(United Kingdom) Oliver Turvey	NIO	1:20.551	+0.997	22

== Race ==
The race got off to a chaotic start after Pascal Wehrlein was turned sideways at the first chicane after making contact with Sébastien Buemi. Wehrlein's car was then wedged between the barriers and the car of Maximilian Günther, thereby blocking the track and leading to a large pile-up. Robin Frijns, while attempting to avoid the wreck, was hit from behind by Jérôme d'Ambrosio and got turned into the wall on the opposite side of the track, ending his race. This event caused much of the field to be stuck behind the incident. A few drivers, including Sébastien Buemi, Lucas di Grassi, Felipe Massa and António Félix da Costa, were able to snake their way through the mess, and use the escape road to continue on.

The race was promptly red-flagged in order to clear the track. This allowed teams to make repairs to their cars. Meanwhile, the race officials decided to reset the field in the order that they had started the race, as they were unable to determine the position of most of the grid when the red flag had come out. Several of drivers who made it past the blockage, and therefore gaining considerable track position, were quite upset about the decision, and got into a heated argument with race officials once they returned to pit road. Lucas di Grassi, who was fighting for the championship with the pole sitter, Jean-Éric Vergne was particularly upset, as he had made up eight places after starting nineteenth. However, the reordering had been done in accordance with the regulations which stated that "in all cases the order will be taken at the last point at which it was possible to determine the position of all cars. All such cars will then be permitted to resume the race." Following the 40-minute stoppage, the race was restarted behind the Safety car with all drivers (save for Frijns) lining up again.

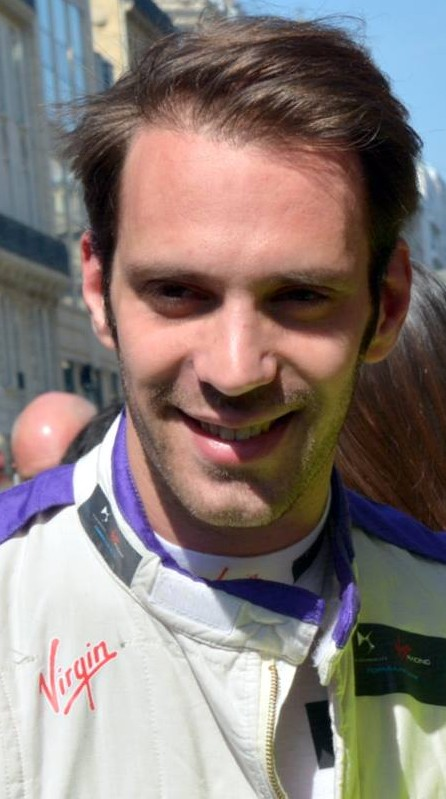
Jean-Éric Vergne (pictured in 2016) extended his championship lead with his third victory of the season.

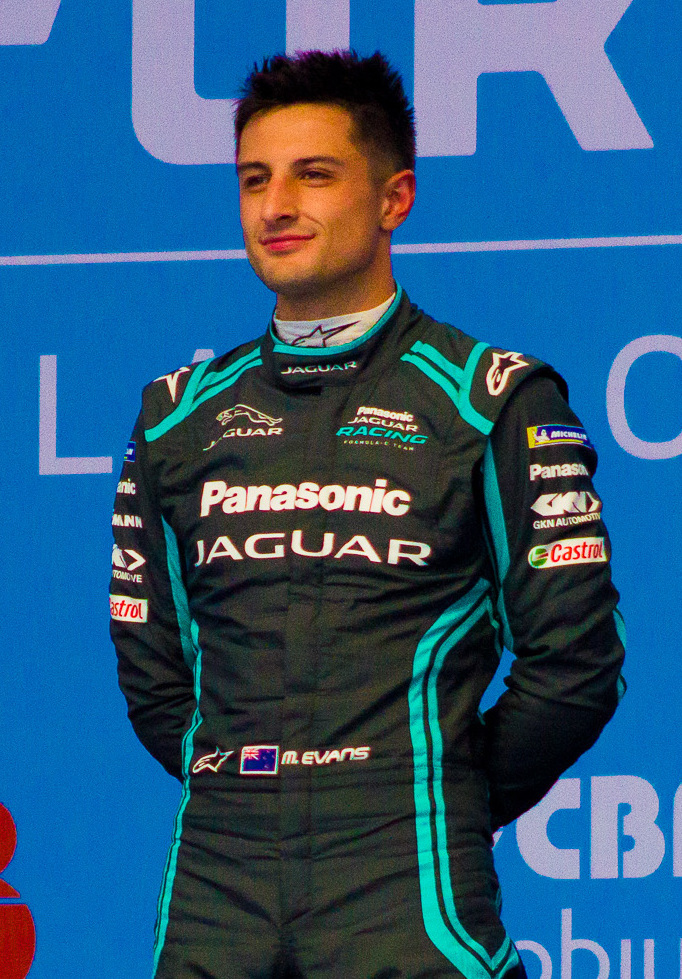
Mitch Evans (pictured in 2020) moved to third in the championship with his second-place finish.

Right from the restart, Vergne came under attack from Mitch Evans. Evans would continue to challenge for the lead most of the race, making several attempts at passing on the downhill run into turn 3. Twice during the race, Evans was able to activate his two attack mode power boosts a lap ahead of Vergne to try and get past the 2017–18 champion, but Vergne was able to defend against the passing attempts, before finally being able to get to the attack mode activation zone himself to equalize the power between their two cars. During his first attempt, Evans was hindered by a local yellow flag caused by the stopped Mahhindra of Pascahl Wehrlein. Wehrlein, who retired from the race due to a technical failure, come to a halt on track just before the attack mode activation zone. During the race, Vergnes' Techeetah teammate, André Lotterer, managed to move up the field to fourth place from his starting place in eighth. The Envision Virgin Racing driver Sam Bird, made a difficult pass for fifth around the outside of the GeoX Dragon of Maximilian Günther going through the fast downhill turn three.

During the final two laps, a heavy rain began to fall on the circuit, adding a new complexity to the race. The rain caught out Sam Bird who spun, losing valuable time, and allowing André Lotterer to get passed for fourth. Evans attempted use the wet tack to his advantage, but Vergne was able to hold on for the win, leading the top four nose-to-tail across the line. Evans came second, leading Buemi in third, and Lotterer in fourth. After his spin, Sam Bird managed to hold onto fifth, ahead of Maximilian Günther in sixth. Daniel Abt, Alex Lynn, and championship contender Lucas di Grassi rounded out the top ten.

== Post Race ==
On the podium, Swiss driver Sébastien Buemi was able to celebrate his home race with his son, who he brought onto the podium with him.

After the race, several drivers were handed penalties for infractions during the race. André Lotterer, who finished fourth, was given a 22-second penalty, thereby dropping him to fourteenth. The Techeetah driver was given the penalty for ignoring a red light when exiting the pit lane following the first lap crash. There was confusion between Lotterer and his team about what the race officials wanted him to do. He had brought his car back to the pit lane before the officials asked all teams to line up on the start-finish straight while they worked on clearing the track. Lotterer confirmed several times with his team several times that he should exit the pit lane and rejoin the rest of the grid. Lotterer was critical of the decision, calling it "extremely harsh".

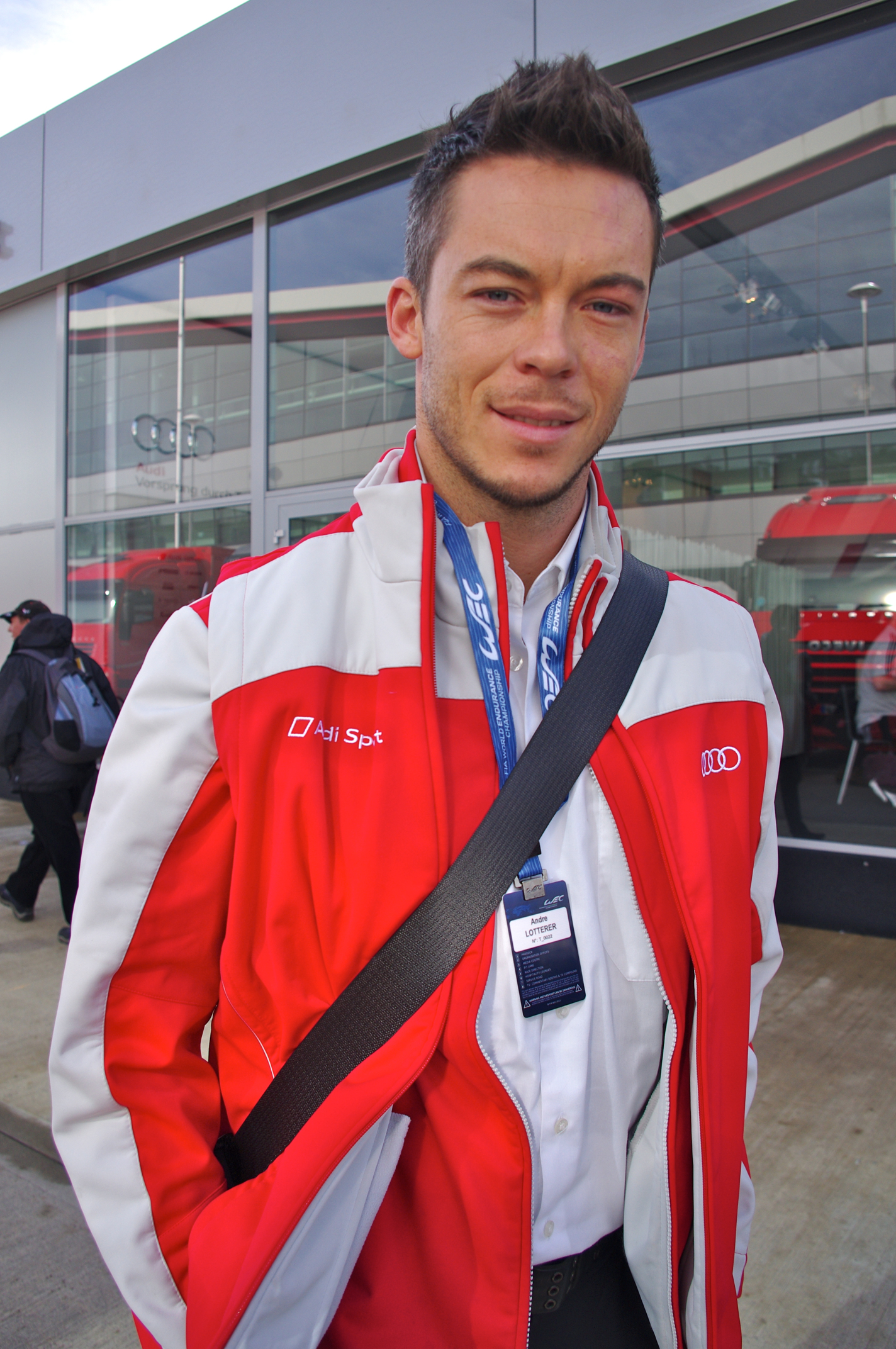
André Lotterer (pictured in 2013) was handed a 22-second penalty after the race.

In addition to the Lotterer penalty, the Dragon Racing driver of José María López, who had finished thirteenth, was disqualified for exceeding the maximum power limit. Edoardo Mortara was penalized for a collision with Alexander Sims, and was given a five-place grid penalty at the following race in New York. Felix da Costa was handed a five-second time penalty for not slowing enough for the full-course yellow, but it kept his 12th-place finish.

Several drivers expressed their displeasure at the way the grid was reset following the red flag. di Grassi, who had managed to make it past the track blockage, described the reorder as "super unfair". Felipe Massa, who also gained positions following the crash, called the decision "totally unacceptable". Massa criticized the fact that cars who were heavily damaged were allowed to be repaired and restart the race in their original positions, ahead of cars that were able to avoid the pile-up and did not need repairs. Sam Bird commented that the first corner chicane was an "accident waiting to happen" given the narrowness of the circuit, as well as the brakes and tires not being up to temperature on the first lap.

The consequence of the race meant Vergne extended his lead in the Drivers' Championship to 32 points over Lucas di Grassi going into the final events in New York. With 87 points, Evans's second-place finish jumped him from sixth to third in the standings. As a result of his penalty, André Lotterer dropped to fourth in the standings, 44 points behind his teammate Vergne. Techeetah retained first in the Teams' Championship with 216 points, 43 points ahead of Audi. Virgin, e.Dams and Mahindra maintained third, fourth and fifth respectively.

It was announced prior to the event that the Swiss ePrix would be left off the calendar for the 2019–20 season. A report by the city government following the race was generally positive, but identified several issues with the event, including lack of access to local homes and businesses, disruption to public transit, and lack of communication to residents. In January 2020, it was announced that the company that organized the race had gone bankrupt.

== Classification ==
=== Race ===
Pos.	No.	Driver	Team	Laps	Time/Retired	Grid	Points
1	25	(France) Jean-Éric Vergne	Techeetah-DS	31	1:25:26.873	1	25+3^{4}
2	20	(New Zealand) Mitch Evans	Jaguar	31	+0.160	2	18
3	23	(Switzerland) Sébastien Buemi	e.Dams-Nissan	31	+0.720	3	15
4	2	(United Kingdom) Sam Bird	Virgin-Audi	31	+2.996	6	12+1^{5}
5	6	(Germany) Maximilian Günther	Dragon-Penske	31	+4.625	5	10
6	66	(Germany) Daniel Abt	Audi	31	+6.930	7	8
7	3	(United Kingdom) Alex Lynn	Jaguar	31	+9.972	10	6
8	19	(Brazil) Felipe Massa	Venturi	31	+12.310	12	4
9	11	(Brazil) Lucas di Grassi	Audi	31	+13.073	19	2
10	5	(Belgium) Stoffel Vandoorne	HWA-Venturi	31	+13.386	15	1
11	27	(United Kingdom) Alexander Sims	Andretti-BMW	31	+14.714	17	
12	28	(Portugal) António Félix da Costa	Andretti-BMW	31	+18.917^{1}	20	
13	64	(Belgium) Jérôme d'Ambrosio	Mahindra	31	+21.872	11	
14	36	(Germany) André Lotterer	Techeetah-DS	31	+23.106^{2}	8	
15	8	(France) Tom Dillmann	NIO	31	+40.084	21	
16	16	(United Kingdom) Oliver Turvey	NIO	31	+46.622	22	
17	17	(United Kingdom) Gary Paffett	HWA-Venturi	31	+1:22.512	16	
Ret	22	(United Kingdom) Oliver Rowland	e.Dams-Nissan	21	Suspension	13	
Ret	94	(Germany) Pascal Wehrlein	Mahindra	11	Technical	4	
Ret	48	(Switzerland) Edoardo Mortara	Venturi	5	Brakes	18	
Ret	4	(Netherlands) Robin Frijns	Virgin-Audi	0	Collision	9	
DSQ	7	(Argentina) José María López	Dragon-Penske	31	Power usage^{3}	14	

Notes:

- ^1 – António Félix da Costa received 5-second time penalty for speeding under Full Course Yellow.
- ^2 – André Lotterer received a drive through penalty converted into a 22-second time penalty for ignoring pit exit light.
- ^3 – José María López originally finished thirteenth, but was disqualified for exceeding power usage over 200 kW.
- ^4 – Pole position.
- ^5 – Fastest lap.

== Standings after the race ==
Drivers' Championship standings

+/–	Pos	Driver	Points
	1	(France) Jean-Éric Vergne	130
	2	(Brazil) Lucas di Grassi	98
3	3	(New Zealand) Mitch Evans	87
1	4	(Germany) André Lotterer	86
1	5	(Portugal) António Félix da Costa	82

Teams' Championship standings

+/–	Pos	Constructor	Points
	1	(China) DS Techeetah	216
	2	(Germany) Audi Sport ABT Schaeffler	173
	3	(United Kingdom) Virgin-Audi	150
	4	(France) e.Dams-Nissan	139
	5	(India) Mahindra	117

- Notes: Only the top five positions are included for both sets of standings.

Previous race: 2019 Berlin ePrix	FIA Formula E Championship; 2018–19 season	Next race: 2019 New York City ePrix
Previous race: N/A	Swiss ePrix	Next race: N/A
