= 2019 Berlin ePrix =

Race 10 of 13 of the 2018–19 Formula E season
← Previous race	Next race →
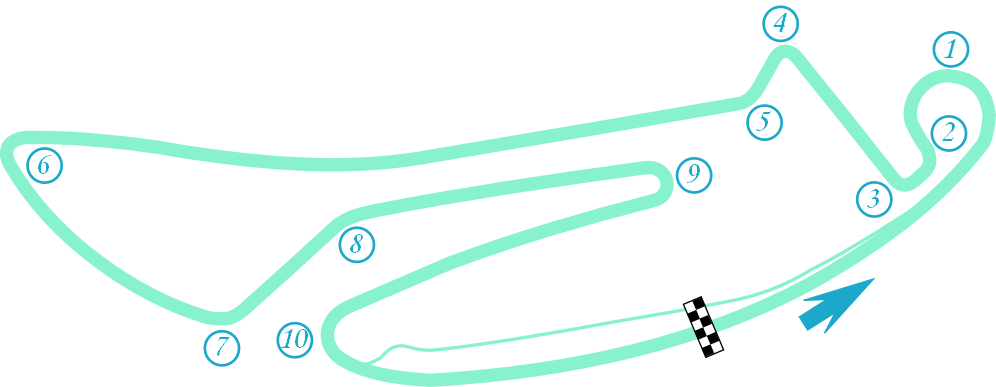

Race details
- Date: 25 May 2019
- Official name: 2019 BMW i Berlin E-Prix presented by CBMM Niobium
- Location: Tempelhof Airport Street Circuit, Berlin
- Course: Street circuit
- Course length: 2.250 km (1.398 mi)
- Distance: 37 laps, 101.250 km (62.914 mi)
- Weather: Cloudy

Pole position
Driver	(Switzerland) Sébastien Buemi	e.Dams-Nissan
- Time: 1:07.295

Fastest lap
Driver	(Brazil) Lucas di Grassi	Audi
- Time: 1:09.357 on lap 29

Podium
First	(Brazil) Lucas di Grassi	Audi
Second	(Switzerland) Sébastien Buemi	e.Dams-Nissan
Third	(France) Jean-Éric Vergne	Techeetah-DS

The 2019 Berlin ePrix (formally the 2019 BMW i Berlin E-Prix presented by CBMM Niobium) was a Formula E electric car race held at the Tempelhof Airport Street Circuit at Tempelhof Airport in the outskirts of Berlin on 25 May 2019. It was the tenth round of the 2018–19 Formula E season and the fifth edition of the event as part of the championship. The 37-lap race was won by Audi driver Lucas di Grassi after starting from third. Sébastien Buemi finished second in the Nissan e.dams, after starting from pole position. Jean-Éric Vergne, the championship leader going into Berlin, took third for Techeetah.

== Report ==
=== Background ===
The Berlin ePrix was confirmed as part of Formula E's 2018–19 series schedule on June 7, 2018 by the FIA World Motor Sport Council. It's the tenth of thirteen scheduled single-seater electric car races of the 2018–19 season, and the fifth running of the event. The ePrix was held at the 2.375 km (1.476 mi) clockwise ten-turn Tempelhof Airport Street Circuit at Berlin Tempelhof Airport on 25 May 2019.

Entering the race, Techeetah driver Jean-Éric Vergne was leading the Drivers' Championship with 87 points, followed by his teammate Andre Lotterer in second by only one point behind, and third placed Virgin Racing's driver Robin Frijns by just 6 points behind the championship leader. In the team's standings, Techeetah lead with 173 points, after both driver finished in the top 10, followed behind by Envision Virgin with 135 and defending constructors champions, Audi Sport Abt Schaeffler down in 3rd with 129 points, after both teams scoring no points in the last race.

After the previous round in Monaco, two drivers received three place grid penalties for causing collisions. Alexander Sims who collided with Di Grassi, and Frijns who collided with Sims.

== Classification ==
=== Qualifying ===
Pos.	No.	Driver	Team	Time	Gap	Grid
1	23	(Switzerland) Sébastien Buemi	e.Dams-Nissan	1:07.295	–	1
2	5	(Belgium) Stoffel Vandoorne	HWA-Venturi	1:07.693	+0.398	2
3	11	(Brazil) Lucas di Grassi	Audi	1:07.719	+0.424	3
4	17	(United Kingdom) Gary Paffett	HWA-Venturi	1:07.783	+0.488	4
5	3	(United Kingdom) Alex Lynn	Jaguar	1:07.849	+0.554	5
6	27	(United Kingdom) Alexander Sims	Andretti-BMW	1:08.017	+0.722	11^{1}
7	66	(Germany) Daniel Abt	Audi	1:07.953	–	6
8	28	(Portugal) António Félix da Costa	Andretti-BMW	1:08.013	+0.060	7
9	25	(France) Jean-Éric Vergne	Techeetah-DS	1:08.046	+0.093	8
10	64	(Belgium) Jérôme d'Ambrosio	Mahindra	1:08.065	+0.112	9
11	94	(Germany) Pascal Wehrlein	Mahindra	1:08.086	+0.133	10
12	22	(United Kingdom) Oliver Rowland	e.Dams-Nissan	1:08.119	+0.166	12
13	2	(United Kingdom) Sam Bird	Virgin-Audi	1:08.182	+0.229	13
14	16	(United Kingdom) Oliver Turvey	NIO	1:08.203	+0.250	14
15	6	(Germany) Maximilian Günther	Dragon-Penske	1:08.218	+0.265	15
16	48	(Switzerland) Edoardo Mortara	Venturi	1:08.223	+0.270	16
17	8	(France) Tom Dillmann	NIO	1:08.263	+0.310	17
18	20	(New Zealand) Mitch Evans	Jaguar	1:08.314	+0.361	18
19	19	(Brazil) Felipe Massa	Venturi	1:08.348	+0.395	19
20	7	(Argentina) José María López	Dragon-Penske	1:08.720	+0.767	20
21	4	(Netherlands) Robin Frijns	Virgin-Audi	1:08.919	+0.966	22^{1}
22	36	(Germany) André Lotterer	Techeetah-DS	1:12.568	+4.615	21

Notes:

- ^1 – Alexander Sims and Robin Frijns received five place grid penalties for causing a collision in the previous race in Monaco

=== Race ===
Pos.	No.	Driver	Team	Laps	Time/Retired	Grid	Points
1	11	(Brazil) Lucas di Grassi	Audi	37	47:02.477	3	25+1^{1}
2	23	(Switzerland) Sébastien Buemi	e.Dams-Nissan	37	+1.856	1	18+3^{2}
3	25	(France) Jean-Éric Vergne	Techeetah-DS	37	+2.522	8	15
4	28	(Portugal) António Félix da Costa	Andretti-BMW	37	+5.845	7	12
5	5	(Belgium) Stoffel Vandoorne	HWA-Venturi	37	+6.336	2	10
6	66	(Germany) Daniel Abt	Audi	37	+6.551	6	8
7	27	(United Kingdom) Alexander Sims	Andretti-BMW	37	+8.235	11	6
8	22	(United Kingdom) Oliver Rowland	e.Dams-Nissan	37	+10.781	12	4
9	2	(United Kingdom) Sam Bird	Virgin-Audi	37	+13.153	13	2
10	94	(Germany) Pascal Wehrlein	Mahindra	37	+14.846	10	1
11	48	(Switzerland) Edoardo Mortara	Venturi	37	+15.377	16	
12	20	(New Zealand) Mitch Evans	Jaguar	37	+17.688	18	
13	4	(Netherlands) Robin Frijns	Virgin-Audi	37	+21.197	22	
14	6	(Germany) Maximilian Günther	Dragon-Penske	37	+26.154	15	
15	19	(Brazil) Felipe Massa	Venturi	37	+26.684	19	
16	17	(United Kingdom) Gary Paffett	HWA-Venturi	37	+27.718	4	
17	64	(Belgium) Jérôme d'Ambrosio	Mahindra	37	+27.729	9	
18	16	(United Kingdom) Oliver Turvey	NIO	37	+32.117	14	
19	8	(France) Tom Dillmann	NIO	37	+33.706	17	
20	7	(Argentina) José María López	Dragon-Penske	37	+46.895	20	
Ret	36	(Germany) André Lotterer	Techeetah-DS	28	Battery	21	
Ret	3	(United Kingdom) Alex Lynn	Jaguar	23	Technical	5	

Notes:

- ^1 – Fastest lap.
- ^2 – Pole position.

== Standings after the race ==
Drivers' Championship standings

+/–	Pos	Driver	Points
	1	(France) Jean-Éric Vergne	102
3	2	(Brazil) Lucas di Grassi	96
1	3	(Germany) André Lotterer	86
	4	(Portugal) António Félix da Costa	82
2	5	(Netherlands) Robin Frijns	81

Teams' Championship standings

+/–	Pos	Constructor	Points
	1	(China) DS Techeetah	188
1	2	(Germany) Audi Sport ABT Schaeffler	163
1	3	(United Kingdom) Virgin-Audi	137
1	4	(France) e.Dams-Nissan	124
1	5	(India) Mahindra	117

- Notes: Only the top five positions are included for both sets of standings.

Previous race: 2019 Monaco ePrix	FIA Formula E Championship; 2018–19 season	Next race: 2019 Swiss ePrix
Previous race: 2018 Berlin ePrix	Berlin ePrix	Next race: 2020 Berlin ePrix
