= 2019 Mexico City ePrix =

Race 4 of 13 of the 2018–19 Formula E season
← Previous race	Next race →
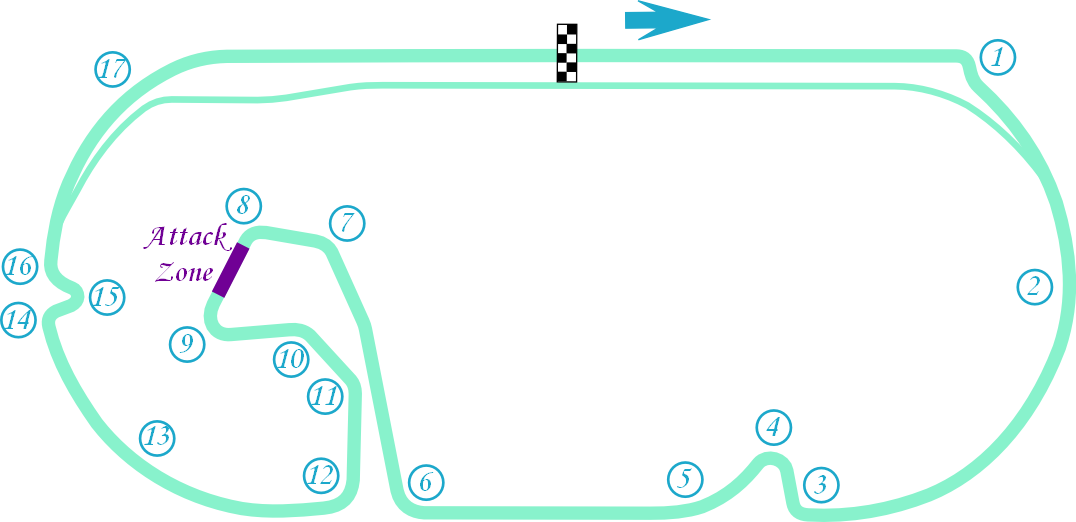

Race details
- Date: 16 February 2019
- Official name: 2019 CBMM Niobium Mexico City E-Prix
- Location: Autódromo Hermanos Rodríguez, Mexico City
- Course: Permanent racing facility
- Course length: 2.093 km (1.301 mi)
- Distance: 45 laps, 94.185 km (58.524 mi)
- Weather: Warm and sunny

Pole position
Driver	(Germany) Pascal Wehrlein	Mahindra
- Time: 0:59.347

Fastest lap
Driver	(Germany) Pascal Wehrlein	Mahindra
- Time: 1:01.112 on lap 10

Podium
First	(Brazil) Lucas di Grassi	Audi
Second	(Portugal) António Félix da Costa	Andretti-BMW
Third	(Switzerland) Edoardo Mortara	Venturi

The 2019 Mexico City ePrix (formally the 2019 CBMM Niobium Mexico City E-Prix) was a Formula E electric car race held at the Autódromo Hermanos Rodríguez in the centre of Mexico City on 16 February 2019. It was the fourth round of the 2018–19 Formula E season and the fourth edition of the event as part of the championship. The 45-lap race was won by Audi driver Lucas di Grassi after starting from second position. António Félix da Costa finished second for Andretti and Edoardo Mortara came in third for Venturi.

== Report ==
=== Background ===
The Mexico City ePrix was confirmed on for the 4th consecutive year on June 7, 2018, by the FIA World Motor Sport Council, and was held at the permanent Autódromo Hermanos Rodríguez located in Magdalena Mixhuca Sports City in the southeast of Mexico City. It was both the 4th race of the season and the 4th time the annual race had been held in Mexico City. The sport continued to use the 2.092 km (1.299 mi) short circuit centred around the Foro Sol which had 17 turns, 12 to the right and 5 to the left. At 2,250 m (7381.89 ft) above sea level, it is the highest track on the calendar.

After winning in Santiago the previous weekend, Sam Bird entered the weekend leading the drivers championship with 43 points and a 2-point lead over Jerome d'Ambrosio. Third place was António Félix da Costa who had failed to score since winning the opening race of the season in Ad Diriyah. He was tied on points with both Sam Bird's Virgin Racing teammate Robin Frijns and Techeetah driver, and defending champion, Jean-Éric Vergne, all three of which had 28 points. In the teams championship, Virgin led with 71 points with Mahindra close behind in second, with 59 points and Techeetah in third with 47 points. Going into the weekend, only one team had failed to score points, that team being HWA.

There was one driver change before the weekend, with former Formula 1 driver Felipe Nasr replacing Maximilian Günther at Dragon Racing after Günther had completed a three race programme with the team which started at the opening round in Ad Diriyah.

=== Practice ===
Both practice sessions were held early on Saturday morning. Practice 1 started shortly after sunrise, meaning that the track was considerably colder than normal, causing several drivers to be caught out by lack of grip. This became apparent when Robin Frijns spun his Envision Virgin 180 degrees on approach to turn 3. Daniel Abt was the fastest in Practice 1 with a time of 59.319. Second fastest was Edoardo Mortara with a 59.397 and third was Alexander Sims with a time of 59.539.

Practice 2 got underway, one and a half hours after the first practice. The only notable incident during Practice 2 is when Oliver Turvey clipped the inside of turn 15 and broke his suspension. Da Costa set the pace with a 58.963, followed by Felipe Massa with a 59.138 and with Sébastien Buemi rounding out the top 3 with a 59.248.

=== Qualifying ===
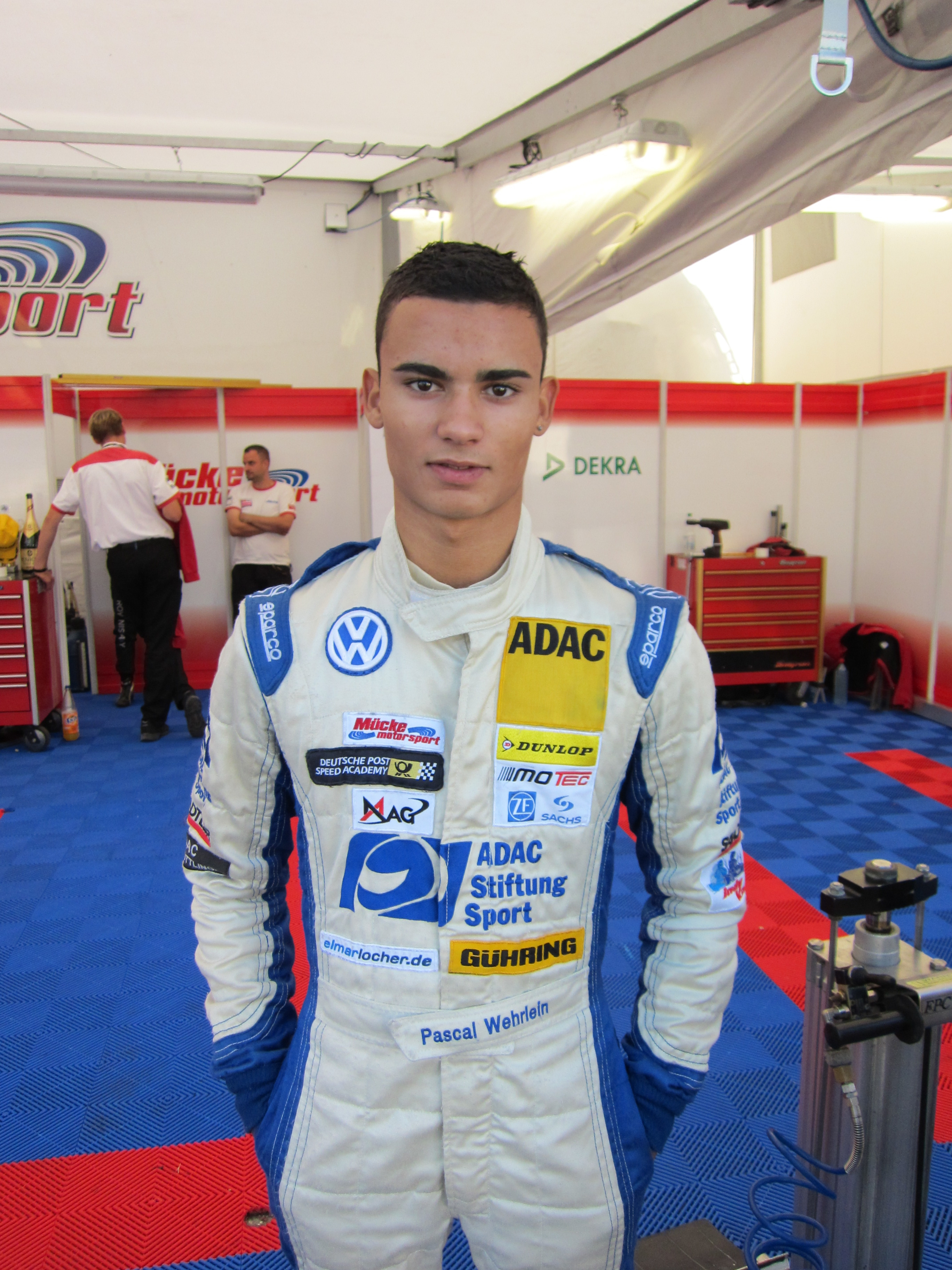
Pascal Wehrlein (pictured in 2011) gets his first pole position in Formula E, after only three races of the season since his debut.

Qualifying was divided into four groups. During the group 1 Qualifying session, the championship leader Sam Bird had his car broke down with a driveshaft problem before he could set a flying lap. Bird would start the Mexico City ePrix from the back of the grid. Oliver Rowland was fastest on the overall group qualifying, with a time of 59.593, ahead of Pascal Wehrlein. Jerome D'Ambrosio qualifies at 19th, while Frijns takes 17th, but was later demoted to 20th after impeding D'Ambrosio. After group qualifying, Rowland, Wehrlein, Massa, Di Grassi, Buemi, and Da Costa progressed to super pole. Pascal Wehrlein went on for his first Pole Position in his Formula E career with a time of 59.347 to secure Mahindra Racing’s first pole since 2018 Rome ePrix, by a margin of three-tenths over Lucas di Grassi. Massa qualifies third, while Rowland takes forth, ahead of BMW Andretti driver, António Félix da Costa, and his teammate Sébastien Buemi.

=== Race ===
The race began at 16:03 Mexico Time (UTC-06:00). Weather conditions at the start of the race were dry. The air temperature throughout ranged from 28.5 to 26.5 °C (83.3 to 79.7 °F) and the track temperature drops from 45 to 38 °C. Each driver was mandated to activate the attack mode system twice and were permitted to arm the system no more than five times. A special feature of Formula E is the "Fan Boost" feature, an additional 25 kW (34 hp) of power to use during the race's second half. The five drivers who were allowed to use the boost were determined by a fan vote. For the Mexico City race, Vandoorne, Abt, Félix da Costa, Buemi, and Di Grassi were handed the extra power. Wehrlein defended his lead from di Grassi off the line ahead of Nissan e.dams driver Oliver Rowland, who jumped from fourth to second at the first corner, ahead of Di Grassi in third place.

Into the first five minutes, the race was under red flag, when Nelson Piquet Jr. had a massive accident, smashed over the back of Vergne's Techeetah car, and clipping the rear of Sims's BMW Andretti car before hitting the wall at turn 17. A full course yellow was initially deployed before the race was suspended and Wehrlein led the Mexico City ePrix from Rowland in second place, and Di Grassi in third. At the safety car restart, most of the field took their first attack mode usage. Wehrlein having pressure from Rowland, with Buemi and da Costa catching the leaders later on.

When Rowland took his second attack mode, he runs wide at turn 9 and di Grassi overtook him at the exit of the stadium section to take second place, with Rowland and Buemi touching together at the final chicane. On the final lap, Di Grassi closed up to Wehrlein, but both Nissan drivers, Rowland and Buemi, ran out of energy with a lap to go and dropped down to the back of the field. At the final lap, Di Grassi attacked down the inside at the following Turn 3, the track's main overtaking spot, Wehrlein cut the chicane and retained the lead of the race. But Wehrlein's energy ran out at the final corner and Di Grassi took the win by a few meters.

=== Post-race ===
Pascal Wehrlein received a five-second time penalty, after cutting the chicane at turn three on the final lap, dropping him out of the podium and finishing at sixth place. With the penalty, Da Costa and Mortara were promoted to the second and third places respectively.

The result meant d'Ambrosio, who finished on fourth, still in the top of the Drivers' Championship leader with 53 points, seven point ahead of Da Costa. Di Grassi's victory enabled him to move into fourth position with 34 points, while Bird dropped out of the lead, down to third after finishing in ninth. Mahindra led the Team's Championship with 83 points, with Virgin Racing dropped to second with 10 points behind. BMW Andretti are in third with 64 points. Techeetah dropped to fourth, with only one point ahead of Audi in fifth.

== Classification ==
=== Qualifying ===
Pos.	No.	Driver	Team	Time	Gap	Grid
1	94	(Germany) Pascal Wehrlein	Mahindra	59.347	-	1
2	11	(Brazil) Lucas di Grassi	Audi	59.653	+0.306	2
3	19	(Brazil) Felipe Massa	Venturi	59.695	+0.348	3
4	22	(United Kingdom) Oliver Rowland	e.Dams-Nissan	59.808	+0.461	4
5	28	(Portugal) Antonio Felix da Costa	Andretti-BMW	59.819	+0.472	5
6	23	(Switzerland) Sébastien Buemi	e.Dams-Nissan	59.949	+0.602	6
7	27	(United Kingdom) Alexander Sims	Andretti-BMW	59.782	—	7
8	25	(France) Jean Eric Vergne	Techeetah-DS	59.802	+0.020	8
9	48	(Switzerland) Edoardo Mortara	Venturi	59.935	+0.153	9
10	16	(United Kingdom) Oliver Turvey	NIO	59.936	+0.154	10
11	3	(Brazil) Nelson Piquet Jr.	Jaguar	59.959	+0.177	11
12	36	(Germany) Andre Lotterer	Techeetah-DS	1:00.050	+0.268	12
13	8	(France) Tom Dillmann	NIO	1:00.192	+0.410	13
14	6	(Brazil) Felipe Nasr	Dragon-Penske	1:00.210	+0.428	14
15	7	(Argentina) José María López	Dragon-Penske	1:00.293	+0.511	15
16	17	(United Kingdom) Gary Paffett	HWA-Venturi	1:00.340	+0.558	16
17	4	(Netherlands) Robin Frijns	Virgin-Audi	1:00.375	+0.593	20^{1}
18	20	(New Zealand) Mitch Evans	Jaguar	1:00.424	+0.642	17
19	64	(Belgium) Jérôme d'Ambrosio	Mahindra	1:00.455	+0.673	18
20	5	(Belgium) Stoffel Vandoorne	HWA-Venturi	1:00.844	+1.062	19
21	66	(Germany) Daniel Abt	Audi	1:00.936	+1.154	21
22	2	(United Kingdom) Sam Bird	Virgin-Audi	no time	no time	22

Notes

- ^1 — Robin Frijns received a 3-place grid penalty for impeding Jérôme d'Ambrosio during Qualifying session.

=== Race ===
Pos.	No.	Driver	Team	Laps	Time/Retired	Grid	Points
1	11	(Brazil) Lucas di Grassi	Audi	45	1:13:15.422	2	25
2	28	(Portugal) António Félix da Costa	Andretti-BMW	45	+0.436	5	18
3	48	(Switzerland) Edoardo Mortara	Venturi	45	+0.745	9	15
4	64	(Belgium) Jérôme d'Ambrosio	Mahindra	45	+1.159	18	12
5	36	(Germany) André Lotterer	Techeetah-DS	45	+1.785	12	10
6	94	(Germany) Pascal Wehrlein	Mahindra	45	+5.210^{2}	1	8+3^{5}+1^{6}
7	20	(New Zealand) Mitch Evans	Jaguar	45	+5.800	17	6
8	19	(Brazil) Felipe Massa	Venturi	45	+8.084	3	4
9	2	(United Kingdom) Sam Bird	Virgin-Audi	45	+8.356	22	2
10	66	(Germany) Daniel Abt	Audi	45	+8.438	21	1
11	4	(Netherlands) Robin Frijns	Virgin-Audi	45	+9.044	20	0
12	16	(United Kingdom) Oliver Turvey	NIO	45	+11.252	10	0
13	25	(France) Jean-Éric Vergne	Techeetah-DS	45	+19.153	8	0
14	27	(United Kingdom) Alexander Sims	Andretti-BMW	45	+20.471	7	0
15	8	(France) Tom Dillmann	NIO	45	+20.871	13	0
16	17	(United Kingdom) Gary Paffett	HWA-Venturi	45	+23.272	16	0
17	7	(Argentina) José María López	Dragon-Penske	45	+41.542^{3}	15	0
18	5	(Belgium) Stoffel Vandoorne	HWA-Venturi	45	+43.425^{4}	19	0
19	6	(Brazil) Felipe Nasr	Dragon-Penske	45	+1:56.160	14	0
20	22	(United Kingdom) Oliver Rowland	e.Dams-Nissan	44	Energy	4	0
21	23	(Switzerland) Sébastien Buemi	e.Dams-Nissan	44	Energy	6	0
Ret	3	(Brazil) Nelson Piquet Jr.	Jaguar	2	Collision	11	0

- ^2 — Pascal Wehrlein received 5-second time penalty for cutting the chicane.
- ^3 — José María López received 10-second time penalty for overspeeding in the pit lane and 5-second penalty for crossing the pit entry line.
- ^4 — Stoffel Vandoorne received 5-second time penalty for using the Fanboost earlier than allowed.
- ^5 — Pole position.
- ^6 — Fastest lap.

== Standings after the race ==
Drivers' Championship standings

+/–	Pos	Driver	Points
1	1	(Belgium) Jérôme d'Ambrosio	53
1	2	(Portugal) António Félix da Costa	46
2	3	(United Kingdom) Sam Bird	45
9	4	(Brazil) Lucas Di Grassi	34
4	5	(Germany) Pascal Wehrlein	30

Teams' Championship standings

+/–	Pos	Constructor	Points
1	1	(India) Mahindra	83
1	2	(United Kingdom) Virgin-Audi	73
1	3	(United States) Andretti-BMW	64
1	4	(China) DS Techeetah	57
	5	(Germany) Audi Sport ABT Schaeffler	56

Previous race: 2019 Santiago ePrix	FIA Formula E Championship; 2018–19 season	Next race: 2019 Hong Kong ePrix
Previous race: 2018 Mexico City ePrix	Mexico City ePrix	Next race: 2020 Mexico City ePrix
