= 2018–19 Formula E Championship =

Formula E season

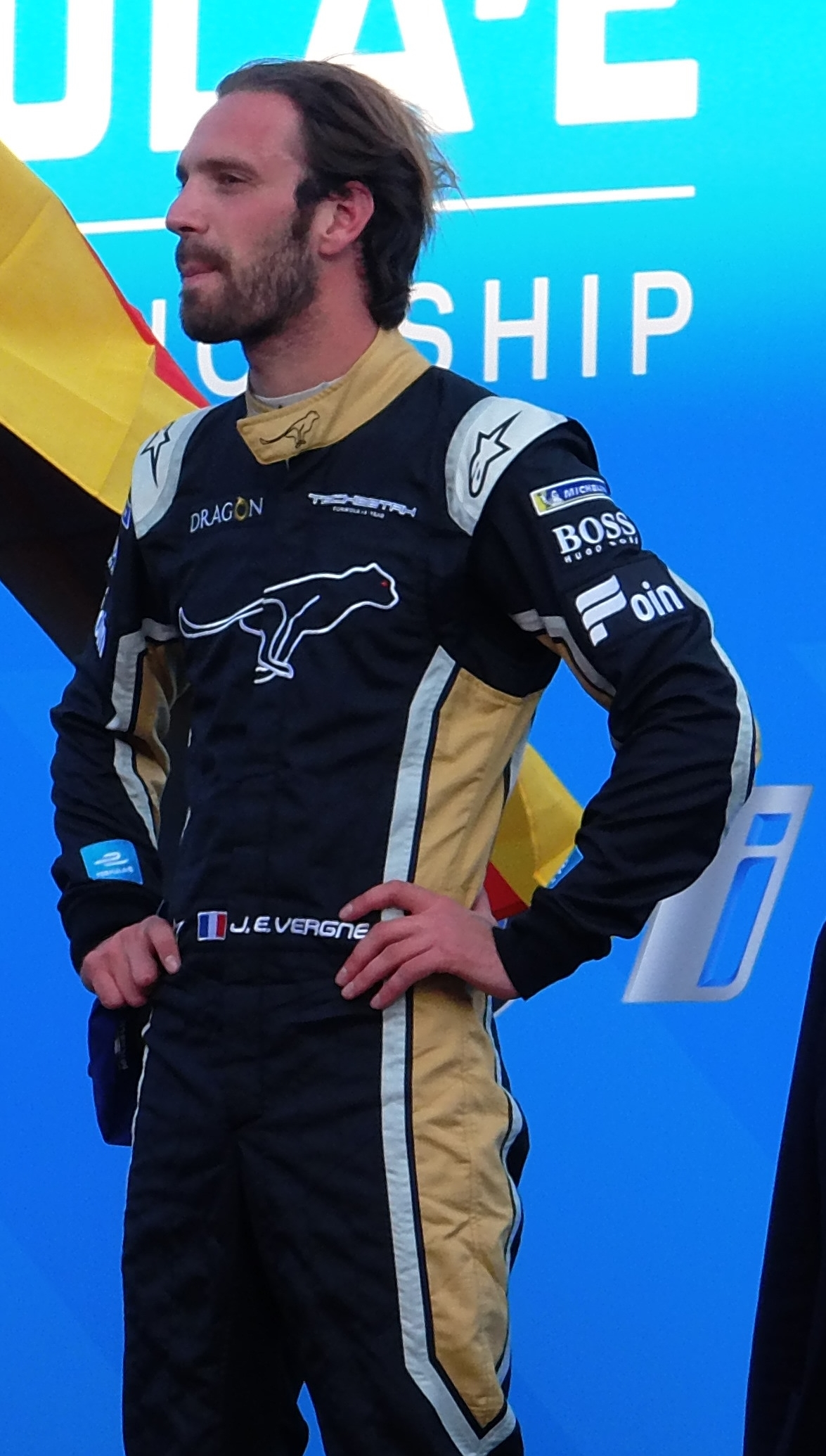
Jean-Éric Vergne won his second Drivers' Championship, becoming the first Formula E Driver in history to win multiple Driver Championships

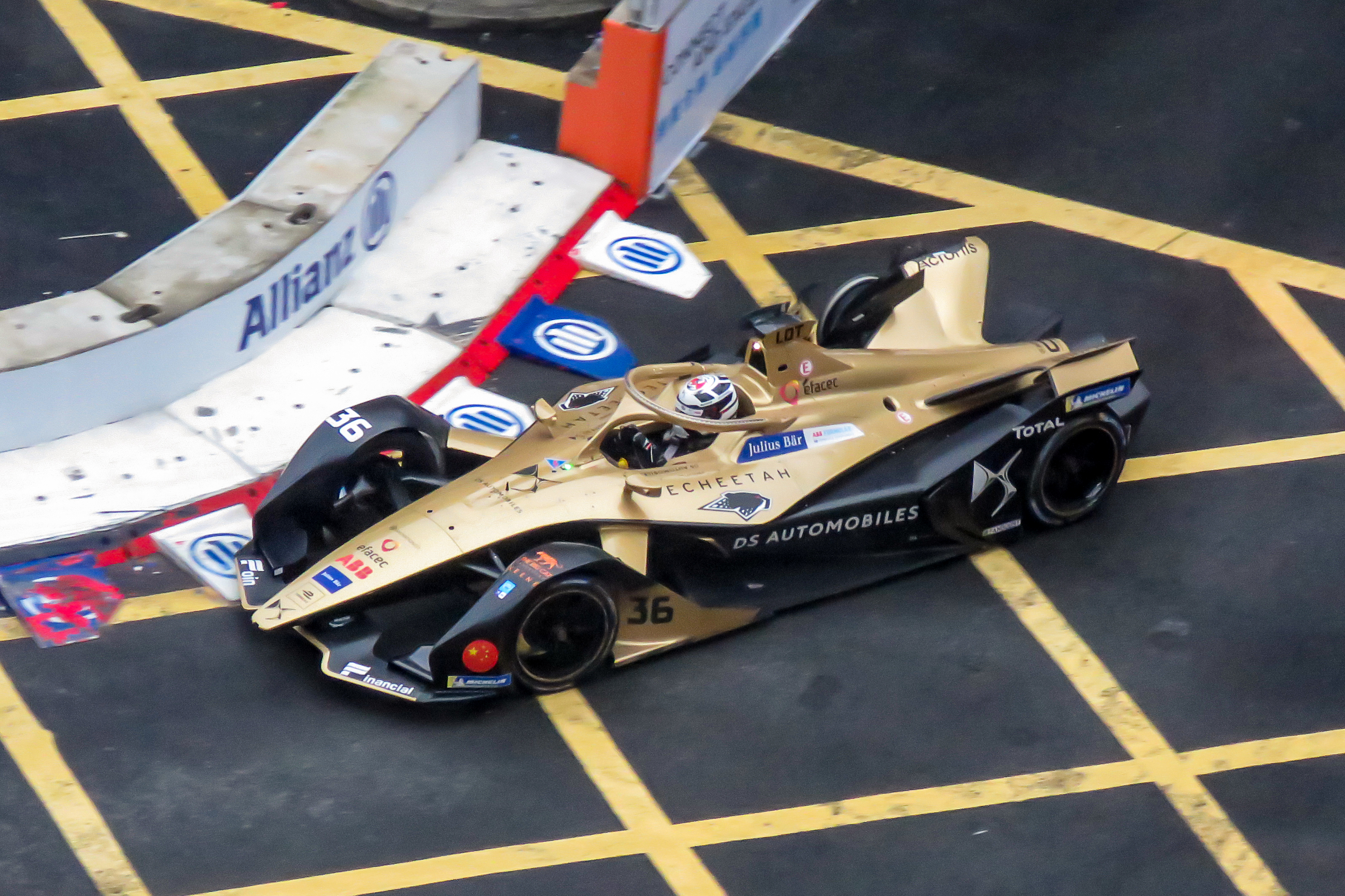
Techeetah won the Teams' Champions

The 2018–19 FIA Formula E Championship was the fifth season of the FIA Formula E championship, a motor racing championship for electrically-powered vehicles recognised by motorsport's governing body, the Fédération Internationale de l'Automobile (FIA), as the highest class of competition for electric open-wheel racing cars.

The 2018–19 season saw the introduction of the all-new Gen2, second generation Formula E car, which boasted significant technological advances over the previous Spark-Renault SRT 01E chassis – its power output rose from 200 kW to 250 kW and top speeds rose to around 280 km/h (174 mph). The arrival of the Gen2 car also saw an end to the series' mid-race car-swaps.

Frenchman Jean-Éric Vergne entered as the defending Drivers' Champion after securing his first title at the New York City ePrix, while Audi Sport Abt Schaeffler returned as defending Teams' Champions – having beaten Vergne's Techeetah team by a narrow two point margin.

The 2019 Hong Kong ePrix was the 50th race of Formula E since its inception in 2014. Formula E has raced in 22 cities in 17 countries across five continents and has seen 13 global manufactures compete in the series. Four drivers have started every Formula E race; they are Lucas di Grassi, Sam Bird, Daniel Abt and Jérôme d'Ambrosio.

The 2018–19 season was the first to have an official support category since Greenpower ran the Schools Series during Formula E's debut 2014–15 season. The Jaguar I-Pace eTrophy featured at 10 of the 13 rounds of the calendar.

After the first race in New York City, Jean-Éric Vergne secured enough points to become the Drivers' Champion, winning his second Formula E championship. Techeetah won their first constructor's championship.

== Teams and drivers ==
All teams used the Spark Gen2 chassis.

Team	Powertrain	No.	Drivers	Rounds
(United Kingdom) Envision Virgin Racing	Audi e-tron FE05	2	(United Kingdom) Sam Bird	All
(United Kingdom) Envision Virgin Racing	Audi e-tron FE05	4	(Netherlands) Robin Frijns	All
(United Kingdom) Panasonic Jaguar Racing	Jaguar I-Type 3	3	(Brazil) Nelson Piquet Jr.	1–6
(United Kingdom) Panasonic Jaguar Racing	Jaguar I-Type 3	3	(United Kingdom) Alex Lynn	7–13
(United Kingdom) Panasonic Jaguar Racing	Jaguar I-Type 3	20	(New Zealand) Mitch Evans	All
(Germany) HWA Racelab	Venturi VFE05	5	(Belgium) Stoffel Vandoorne	All
(Germany) HWA Racelab	Venturi VFE05	17	(United Kingdom) Gary Paffett	All
(United States) GEOX Dragon	Penske EV-3	6	(Germany) Maximilian Günther	1–3, 7–13
(United States) GEOX Dragon	Penske EV-3	6	(Brazil) Felipe Nasr	4–6
(United States) GEOX Dragon	Penske EV-3	7	(Argentina) José María López	All
(United Kingdom) Nio Formula E Team	Nio Sport 004	8	(France) Tom Dillmann	All
(United Kingdom) Nio Formula E Team	Nio Sport 004	16	(United Kingdom) Oliver Turvey	All
(Germany) Audi Sport ABT Schaeffler Formula E Team	Audi e-tron FE05	11	(Brazil) Lucas di Grassi	All
(Germany) Audi Sport ABT Schaeffler Formula E Team	Audi e-tron FE05	66	(Germany) Daniel Abt	All
(Monaco) Venturi Formula E Team	Venturi VFE05	19	(Brazil) Felipe Massa	All
(Monaco) Venturi Formula E Team	Venturi VFE05	48	(Switzerland) Edoardo Mortara	All
(France) Nissan e.dams	Nissan IM01	22	(United Kingdom) Oliver Rowland	All
(France) Nissan e.dams	Nissan IM01	23	(Switzerland) Sébastien Buemi	All
(China) DS Techeetah	DS E-Tense FE 19	25	(France) Jean-Éric Vergne	All
(China) DS Techeetah	DS E-Tense FE 19	36	(Germany) André Lotterer	All
(United States) BMW i Andretti Motorsport (Note: BMW i Andretti Motorsport raced in Riyadh under a British license.)	BMW IFE.18	27	(United Kingdom) Alexander Sims	All
(United States) BMW i Andretti Motorsport	BMW IFE.18	28	(Portugal) António Félix da Costa	All
(India) Mahindra Racing	Mahindra M5Electro	64	(Belgium) Jérôme d'Ambrosio	All
(India) Mahindra Racing	Mahindra M5Electro	94	(Sweden) Felix Rosenqvist	1
(India) Mahindra Racing	Mahindra M5Electro	94	(Germany) Pascal Wehrlein	2–13

=== Team changes ===
- BMW entered Formula E as a manufacturer, partnering with Andretti Autosport.
- Mercedes affiliate HWA entered the championship and establish a technical partnership with Venturi. The agreement sees HWA receive powertrains for the 2018–19 season, serving as a precursor to Mercedes' entry as a manufacturer team in the 2019–20 season.
- Nissan entered the championship as a manufacturer replacing partner company Renault in their partnership with DAMS. Renault cited a desire to concentrate on their Formula One programme as their motivation for leaving Formula E.
- Techeetah switched from Renault to DS Automobiles powertrain, becoming DS Performance's partner. Meanwhile, Virgin Racing switched to use an Audi powertrain.

=== Driver changes ===
- Former Sauber, Ferrari and Williams Formula One driver Felipe Massa made his Formula E debut with Venturi. Massa replaced Maro Engel; Tom Dillmann moved to Nio Formula E Team to replace Luca Filippi.
- Nico Prost left the e.dams team at the end of the 2017–18 season.
- Alexander Sims made his race debut with BMW i Andretti Motorsport alongside regular driver António Félix da Costa.
- Felix Rosenqvist left Mahindra Racing to join Chip Ganassi Racing in the IndyCar Series. He was replaced by former Manor and Sauber Formula One driver and 2015 Deutsche Tourenwagen Masters champion Pascal Wehrlein. On 15 November 2018, it was announced that Rosenqvist will drive the opening round for Mahindra in place of Wehrlein.
- Nick Heidfeld was replaced in the other Mahindra car by Jérôme d'Ambrosio, who moved to the team from Dragon Racing. Jerome d'Ambrosio in turn was replaced at Dragon by former FIA Formula 2 Championship driver Maximilian Günther.
- Robin Frijns returned to Formula E as a Virgin Racing driver, replacing Alex Lynn.
- Former McLaren Formula One driver and 2015 GP2 Series Champion Stoffel Vandoorne and 2018 Deutsche Tourenwagen Masters champion Gary Paffett made their race debut with HWA Racelab.
- FIA Formula 2 Championship driver Alexander Albon was originally due to drive for Nissan e.dams but was released from his contract less than 3 weeks before the start of the season to instead drive in the 2019 Formula One World Championship for Toro Rosso. Oliver Rowland, who drove one race in the 2015-16 Formula E championship replaced Albon.

=== Mid-season changes ===
- After three races in the season, Maximilian Günther was replaced by former Sauber Formula One driver and current Action Express Racing IMSA WeatherTech SportsCar Championship driver Felipe Nasr. Günther returned to Dragon Racing at the Rome ePrix as Nasr drove at the IMSA Long Beach round that weekend. Despite Nasr being scheduled to miss the Rome ePrix he was due to be back for the next race in Paris but Günther stayed on to contest the rest of the season.
- Halfway through the season, Nelson Piquet Jr. left the Jaguar team after the Sanya ePrix. He was replaced by Alex Lynn for the remainder of the season.

== Calendar ==
The 2018–19 championship was contested over thirteen rounds in Europe, Africa, Asia, the Middle East, North America and South America.

Round	ePrix	Country or territory	Circuit	Date
1	Diriyah ePrix	Saudi Arabia	Riyadh Street Circuit	15 December 2018
2	Marrakesh ePrix	Morocco	Circuit International Automobile Moulay El Hassan	12 January 2019
3	Santiago ePrix	Chile	Parque O'Higgins Circuit	26 January 2019
4	Mexico City ePrix	Mexico	Autódromo Hermanos Rodríguez	16 February 2019
5	Hong Kong ePrix	Hong Kong	Hong Kong Central Harbourfront Circuit	10 March 2019
6	Sanya ePrix	China	Haitang Bay Circuit	23 March 2019
7	Rome ePrix	Italy	Circuito Cittadino dell'EUR	13 April 2019
8	Paris ePrix	France	Paris Street Circuit	27 April 2019
9	Monaco ePrix	Monaco	Circuit de Monaco	11 May 2019
10	Berlin ePrix	Germany	Tempelhof Airport Street Circuit	25 May 2019
11	Swiss ePrix	Switzerland	Bern Street Circuit	22 June 2019
12	New York City ePrix Race 1	United States	Brooklyn Street Circuit	13 July 2019
13	New York City ePrix Race 2	United States	Brooklyn Street Circuit	14 July 2019

=== Calendar changes ===
- The series returned to Monaco as the Monaco ePrix is run as a biennial event that alternates with the Historic Grand Prix of Monaco.
- Formula E made its debut in Saudi Arabia with the race to take place on a street circuit in the Ad Diriyah district of Riyadh. The event replaced the Hong Kong ePrix as the opening round of the championship.
- The championship was due to race in São Paulo for the first time. The race had originally been included on the 2017–18 Formula E season calendar before being delayed for one year and replaced with the Punta del Este ePrix. However, the São Paulo race was not included on the provisional calendar published in June 2018 and the Punta del Este race was removed from the schedule.
- A new ePrix in China was added to the calendar with the Hainan resort city of Sanya named as the venue.
- The Santiago ePrix changed its location from Parque Forestal to a bespoke circuit in O'Higgins Park. The move was made following complaints by the residents of Barrio Lastarria, who argued against the original track layout.
- The Swiss ePrix was moved from Zürich to Bern after the former's city officials expressed concerns about the ability of the city's infrastructure to handle a series of large-scale events in quick succession. Organisers have the option to return to Zürich in future seasons.

=== European Races ===
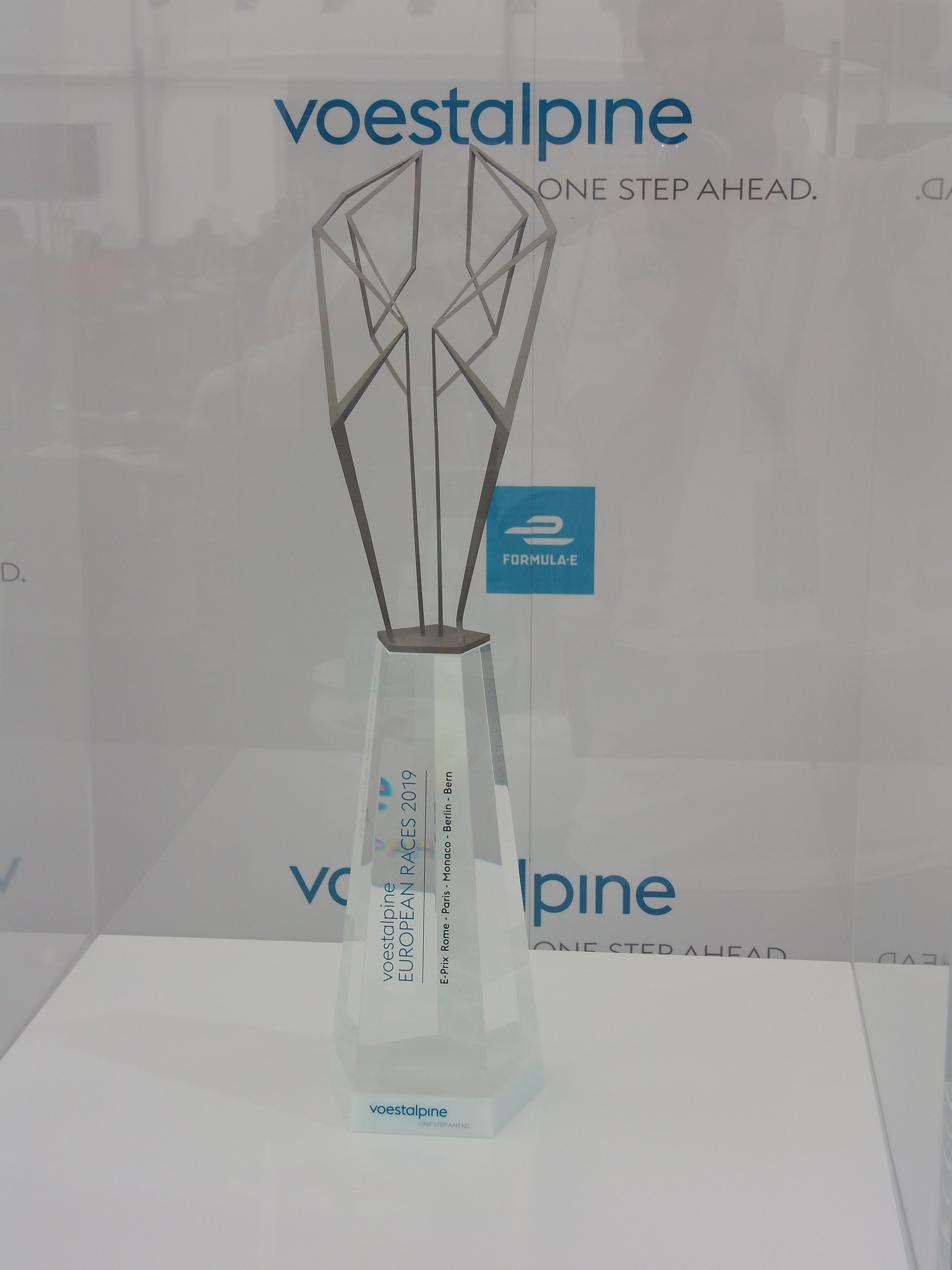
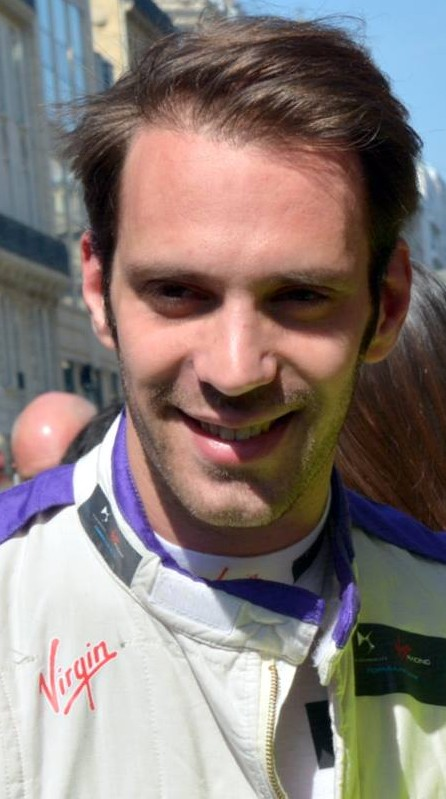
As Jean-Éric Vergne had scored the most podiums during the European leg of the season, he was awarded a trophy by the title sponsor Voestalpine, thus becoming the first ever recipient of the trophy.

A separate competition within the overall Formula E Championship structure which includes all European cities that are part of the calendar has been included. The driver who achieves the best podium finishes of all five races will be awarded a trophy produced by Voestalpine. (Note: The original plan was to award the driver who has collected the most points in all the European races.)

=== ePrix locations ===
Location of non-European ePrix in season 5.
(ePrix – single race)
(ePrix – double header)
Location of European ePrix in season 5.
(held ePrix)

== Changes ==
=== Technical regulations ===
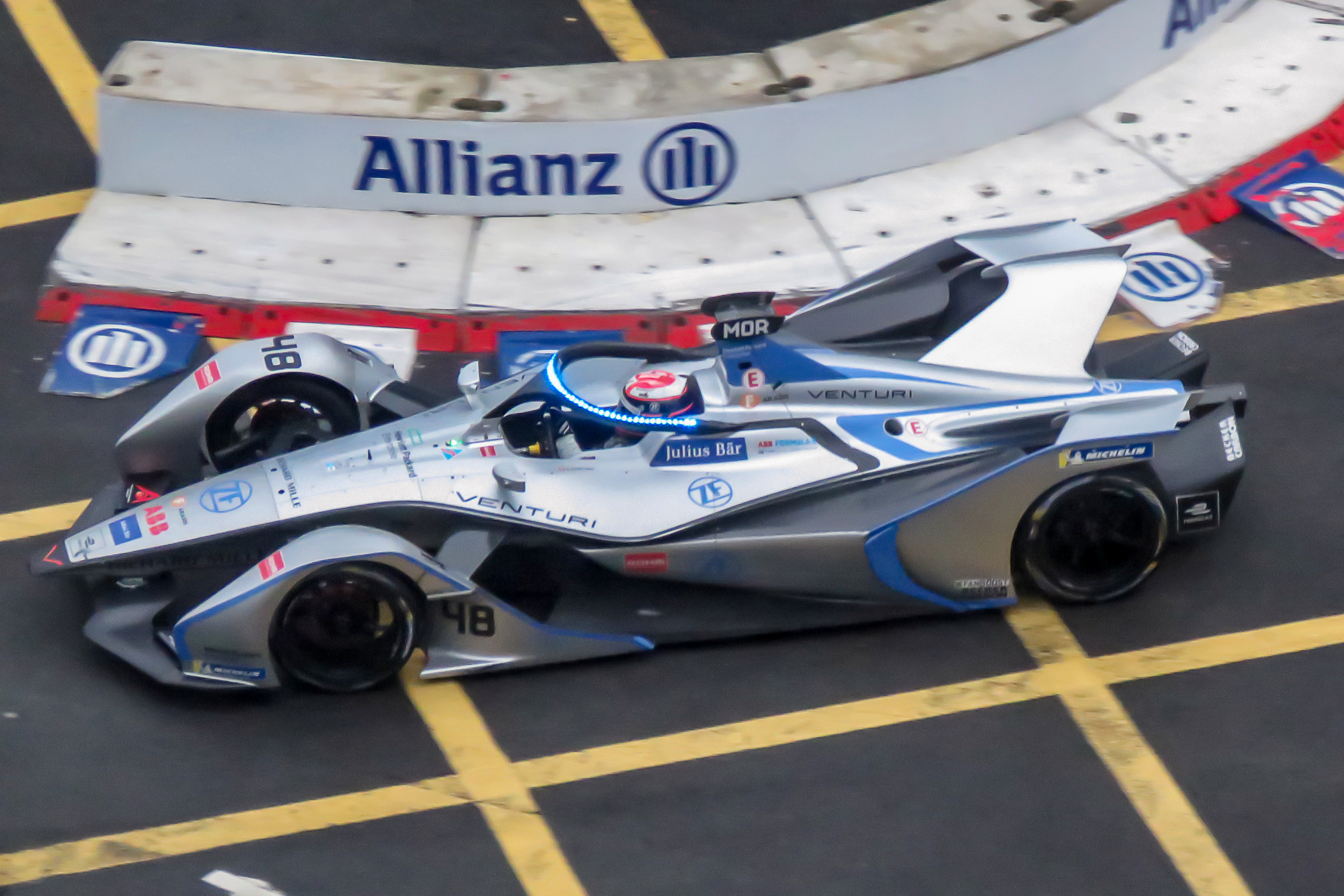
Gen2 car of Edoardo Mortara at the 2019 Hong Kong ePrix showing the Halo LEDs light (in Attack Mode).

- The Spark-Renault SRT 01E, which was used by the championship since its inaugural season, was replaced by a brand-new chassis. The new chassis, which was also developed by Spark Racing Technology, is known as the SRT05e and eschews the conventional design of having a rear wing in favour of incorporating aerodynamic elements into the chassis and floor.
- The category used a new standardised battery produced by McLaren Applied Technologies and Atieva. Each driver is only allowed to use one car per race, thus the battery life now lasts the whole race instead of half distance.
- The series introduced new brakes, as Spark Racing Technology chose Brembo as the sole supplier of the entire braking system for all the single-seaters: discs, calipers, pads, bells and tandem pump.
- The maximum power output of the cars increased to 250 kW. Cars have a series of pre-set power modes which were introduced to encourage strategic racing without allowing a team to gain a competitive advantage through powertrain development.
- The series also introduced a system officially called "attack mode" or dubbed "Mario Kart mode" in which drivers receive an additional 25 kW of power by driving through a designated area of the circuit off the racing line. The duration of the boost mode and the number of boosts available was meant to only decided shortly ahead of each race by the FIA to stop teams from anticipating its use and incorporating it into race strategy. However, this largely did not happen, with all events except the second race in New York having two attack mode activations of 4 minutes each, with the final race having 3 activations, also of 4 minutes each.
- The "halo" cockpit protection device was introduced on the chassis to meet the FIA rules that the halo should be involved in all single seater series by 2020.

=== Sporting regulations ===
- Races were no longer run to a set number of laps. Rather, they ran for forty-five minutes and complete an additional lap once the time limit has expired.

== Results and standings ==
=== ePrix ===
Round	Race	Pole position	Fastest lap	Winning driver	Winning team	Report
1	(Saudi Arabia) Ad Diriyah	(Portugal) António Félix da Costa	(Germany) André Lotterer	(Portugal) António Félix da Costa	(United Kingdom) BMW i Andretti Motorsport	Report
2	(Morocco) Marrakesh	(United Kingdom) Sam Bird	(Brazil) Lucas di Grassi	(Belgium) Jérôme d'Ambrosio	(India) Mahindra Racing	Report
3	(Chile) Santiago	(Switzerland) Sébastien Buemi (Note: Lucas di Grassi set the fastest time but was excluded for driving infringement.)	(Germany) Daniel Abt	(United Kingdom) Sam Bird	(United Kingdom) Envision Virgin Racing	Report
4	Mexico City	(Germany) Pascal Wehrlein	(Germany) Pascal Wehrlein	(Brazil) Lucas di Grassi	(Germany) Audi Sport Abt Schaeffler	Report
5	Hong Kong	(Belgium) Stoffel Vandoorne	(Germany) André Lotterer (Note: Point for Fastest Lap awarded to Sam Bird as Lotterer did not finish inside the top 10.)	(Switzerland) Edoardo Mortara (Note: Sam Bird and Envision Virgin Racing were initial winners but was given 5-second time penalty for causing a collision.)	(Monaco) Venturi Formula E Team	Report
6	(China) Sanya	(United Kingdom) Oliver Rowland	(France) Jean-Éric Vergne	(France) Jean-Éric Vergne	(China) DS Techeetah	Report
7	(Italy) Rome	(Germany) André Lotterer	(France) Jean-Éric Vergne (Note: Point for Fastest Lap awarded to Sebastien Buemi as Vergne did not finish inside the top 10.)	(New Zealand) Mitch Evans	(United Kingdom) Panasonic Jaguar Racing	Report
8	(France) Paris	(United Kingdom) Oliver Rowland (Note: Pascal Wehrlein set the fastest time but was excluded for a technical infringement.)	(France) Tom Dillmann (Note: Point for Fastest Lap awarded to Robin Frijns as Dillmann did not finish inside the top 10.)	(Netherlands) Robin Frijns	(United Kingdom) Envision Virgin Racing	Report
9	Monaco	(United Kingdom) Oliver Rowland (Note: Oliver Rowland set the fastest time and received three points for pole position and the award but had a three-place grid penalty for colliding with Alexander Sims in the Paris E-Prix. Therefore, he started in fourth place while Jean-Éric Vergne started in pole position.)	(Germany) Pascal Wehrlein	(France) Jean-Éric Vergne	(China) DS Techeetah	Report
10	(Germany) Berlin	(Switzerland) Sébastien Buemi	(Brazil) Lucas di Grassi	(Brazil) Lucas di Grassi	(Germany) Audi Sport Abt Schaeffler	Report
11	(Switzerland) Bern	(France) Jean-Éric Vergne	(Portugal) António Félix da Costa (Note: Point for Fastest Lap awarded to Sam Bird as da Costa did not finish inside the top 10.)	(France) Jean-Éric Vergne	(China) DS Techeetah	Report
12	(United States) New York City	(Switzerland) Sébastien Buemi	(France) Jean-Éric Vergne (Note: Point for Fastest Lap awarded to Daniel Abt as Vergne did not finish inside the top 10.)	(Switzerland) Sébastien Buemi	(France) Nissan e.dams	Report
13	(United States) New York City	(United Kingdom) Alexander Sims	(Germany) Daniel Abt	(Netherlands) Robin Frijns	(United Kingdom) Envision Virgin Racing	Report

=== Drivers' Championship standings ===
Points were awarded to the top ten classified finishers in every race, the pole position starter, and the driver who set the fastest lap, using the following structure:

Position	1st	2nd	3rd	4th	5th	6th	7th	8th	9th	10th	Pole	FL
Points	25	18	15	12	10	8	6	4	2	1	3	1

Pos.	Driver	ADR (Saudi Arabia)	MRK (Morocco)	SCL (Chile)	MEX (Mexico)	HKG (Hong Kong)	SYX (China)	RME (Italy)	PAR (France)	MCO (Monaco)	BER (Germany)	BRN (Switzerland)	NYC (United States)		Pts
1	(France) Jean-Éric Vergne	2	5	Ret	13	13	1	14	6	1	3	**1**	15	7	136
2	(Switzerland) Sébastien Buemi	6	8*	**Ret***	21†*	Ret*	8*	5*	15*	5*	**2***	3*	**1***	3*	119
3	(Brazil) Lucas di Grassi	9*	7	12	1*	2	15†*	7*	4	Ret	1	9*	5*	18†*	108
4	(Netherlands) Robin Frijns	12	2	5	11	3	14†	4	1	17†	13	Ret	Ret	1	106
5	(New Zealand) Mitch Evans	4	9	6	7	7	9	1	16	6	12	2	2	17	105
6	(Portugal) António Félix da Costa	**1***	Ret*	Ret*	2*	10*	3*	9*	7*	DSQ*	4*	12*	3*	9*	99
7	(Germany) Daniel Abt	8*	10	3*	10*	4*	5*	18†*	3*	15*	6*	6*	6*	5*	95
8	(Germany) André Lotterer	5	6	13	5	14	4	**2**	2	7	Ret	14	17	Ret	86
9	(United Kingdom) Sam Bird	11	**3**	1	9	6	Ret	11	11	16†	9	4	8	4	85
10	(United Kingdom) Oliver Rowland	7	15	Ret	20†	Ret	**2**	6	**12**	**2**	8	Ret	14	6	71
11	(Belgium) Jérôme d'Ambrosio	3	1	10*	4	Ret	6	8	17†	11	17	13	9	11	67
12	(Germany) Pascal Wehrlein		Ret*	2	**6**	Ret*	7	10	10	4	10	Ret	7	12	58
13	(United Kingdom) Alexander Sims	18	4	7	14	Ret	Ret	17	Ret	13	7	11	4	**2**	57
14	(Switzerland) Edoardo Mortara	19	13	4	3	1	13	Ret	Ret	Ret	11	Ret	Ret	Ret	52
15	(Brazil) Felipe Massa	17*	18*	Ret	8	5	10	Ret	9*	3	15*	8	16†	15	36
16	(Belgium) Stoffel Vandoorne	16*	Ret*	Ret*	18*	**Ret***	Ret*	3*	Ret*	9*	5*	10*	13*	8*	35
17	(Germany) Maximilian Günther	15	12	Ret				19†	5	Ret	14	5	Ret	19†	20
18	(United Kingdom) Alex Lynn							12	Ret	8	Ret	7	Ret	16	10
19	(United Kingdom) Gary Paffett	Ret	Ret	14	16	8	Ret	Ret	8	12	16	17	11	10	9
20	(United Kingdom) Oliver Turvey	13	16	8	12	9	11	13	14	Ret	18	16	10	13	7
21	(Argentina) José María López	Ret	11	9	17	11	Ret	16	13	10*	20	DSQ	12	Ret	3
22	(Brazil) Nelson Piquet Jr.	10	14	11	Ret	Ret	Ret								1
23	(France) Tom Dillmann	14	17	Ret	15	12	12	15	Ret	14	19	15	Ret	14	0
24	(Brazil) Felipe Nasr				19	Ret	Ret								0
	(Sweden) Felix Rosenqvist	Ret													0
Pos.	Driver	ADR (Saudi Arabia)	MRK (Morocco)	SCL (Chile)	MEX (Mexico)	HKG (Hong Kong)	SYX (China)	RME (Italy)	PAR (France)	MCO (Monaco)	BER (Germany)	BRN (Switzerland)	NYC (United States)		Pts

Colour	Result
Gold	Winner
Silver	Second place
Bronze	Third place
Green	Points classification
Blue	Non-points classification
Blue	Non-classified finish (NC)
Purple	Retired, not classified (Ret)
Red	Did not qualify (DNQ)
Red	Did not pre-qualify (DNPQ)
Black	Disqualified (DSQ)
White	Did not start (DNS)
White	Withdrew (WD)
White	Race cancelled (C)
Blank	Did not practice (DNP)
Blank	Did not arrive (DNA)
Blank	Excluded (EX)

**Bold** – Pole
Italics – Fastest Lap
* – FanBoost

† – Drivers did not finish the race, but were classified as they completed more than 90% of the race distance.

=== Voestalpine European races Trophy ===
European Races standings
Pos.	Driver	RME (Italy)	PAR (France)	MCO (Monaco)	BER (Germany)	BRN (Switzerland)	Podiums			(total)
1	(France) Jean-Éric Vergne	14	6	1	3	1	**2**	0	**1**	3
2	(New Zealand) Mitch Evans	1	16	6	12	2	**1**	**1**	0	2
3	(Germany) André Lotterer	**2**	2	7	Ret	14	0	**2**	0	2
4	(Switzerland) Sébastien Buemi	5	15	5	**2**	3	0	**1**	**1**	2
5	(Netherlands) Robin Frijns	4	1	17†	13	Ret	**1**	0	0	1
5	(Brazil) Lucas di Grassi	7	4	Ret	1	9	**1**	0	0	1
6	(United Kingdom) Oliver Rowland	6	**12**	**2**	8	Ret	0	**1**	0	1
7	(Belgium) Stoffel Vandoorne	3	Ret	9	5	10	0	0	**1**	1
7	(Germany) Daniel Abt	18†	3	15	6	6	0	0	**1**	1
7	(Brazil) Felipe Massa	Ret	9	3	15	8	0	0	**1**	1
**Jean-Éric Vergne** has won the trophy.

=== Teams' Championship standings ===
Pos.	Team	No.	ADR (Saudi Arabia)	MRK (Morocco)	SCL (Chile)	MEX (Mexico)	HKG (Hong Kong)	SYX (China)	RME (Italy)	PAR (France)	MCO (Monaco)	BER (Germany)	BRN (Switzerland)	NYC (United States)		Pts
1	(China) DS Techeetah	25	2	5	Ret	13	13	1	14	6	1	3	**1**	15	7	222
1	(China) DS Techeetah	36	5	6	13	5	14	4	**2**	2	7	Ret	14	17	Ret	222
2	(Germany) Audi Sport ABT Schaeffler Formula E Team	11	9	7	12	1	2	15†	7	4	Ret	1	9	5	18†	203
2	(Germany) Audi Sport ABT Schaeffler Formula E Team	66	8	10	3	10	4	5	18†	3	15	6	6	6	5	203
3	(United Kingdom) Envision Virgin Racing	2	11	**3**	1	9	6	Ret	11	11	16†	9	4	8	4	191
3	(United Kingdom) Envision Virgin Racing	4	12	2	5	11	3	14†	4	1	17†	13	Ret	Ret	1	191
4	(France) Nissan e.dams	22	7	15	Ret	20†	Ret	**2**	6	**12**	**2**	8	Ret	14	6	190
4	(France) Nissan e.dams	23	6	8	**Ret**	21†	Ret	8	5	15	5	**2**	3	**1**	3	190
5	(United States) BMW i Andretti Motorsport	27	18	4	7	14	Ret	Ret	17	Ret	13	7	11	4	**2**	156
5	(United States) BMW i Andretti Motorsport	28	**1**	Ret	Ret	2	10	3	9	7	DSQ	4	12	3	9	156
6	(India) Mahindra Racing	64	3	1	10	4	Ret	6	8	17†	11	17	13	9	11	125
6	(India) Mahindra Racing	94	Ret	Ret	2	**6**	Ret	7	10	10	4	10	Ret	7	12	125
7	(United Kingdom) Panasonic Jaguar Racing	3	10	14	11	Ret	Ret	Ret	12	Ret	8	Ret	7	Ret	16	116
7	(United Kingdom) Panasonic Jaguar Racing	20	4	9	6	7	7	9	1	16	6	12	2	2	17	116
8	(Monaco) Venturi Formula E Team	19	17	18	Ret	8	5	10	Ret	9	3	15	8	16†	15	88
8	(Monaco) Venturi Formula E Team	48	19	13	4	3	1	13	Ret	Ret	Ret	11	Ret	Ret	Ret	88
9	(Germany) HWA Racelab	5	16	Ret	Ret	18	**Ret**	Ret	3	Ret	9	5	10	13	8	44
9	(Germany) HWA Racelab	17	Ret	Ret	14	16	8	Ret	Ret	8	12	16	17	11	10	44
10	(United States) GEOX Dragon	6	15	12	Ret	19	Ret	Ret	19†	5	Ret	14	5	Ret	19†	23
10	(United States) GEOX Dragon	7	Ret	11	9	17	11	Ret	16	13	10	20	DSQ	12	Ret	23
11	(United Kingdom) Nio Formula E Team	8	14	17	Ret	15	12	12	15	Ret	14	19	15	Ret	14	7
11	(United Kingdom) Nio Formula E Team	16	13	16	8	12	9	11	13	14	Ret	18	16	10	13	7
Pos.	Team	No.	ADR (Saudi Arabia)	MRK (Morocco)	SCL (Chile)	MEX (Mexico)	HKG (Hong Kong)	SYX (China)	RME (Italy)	PAR (France)	MCO (Monaco)	BER (Germany)	BRN (Switzerland)	NYC (United States)		Pts
