= DS Techeetah =

Sino-French motor racing team

(China) DS Techeetah
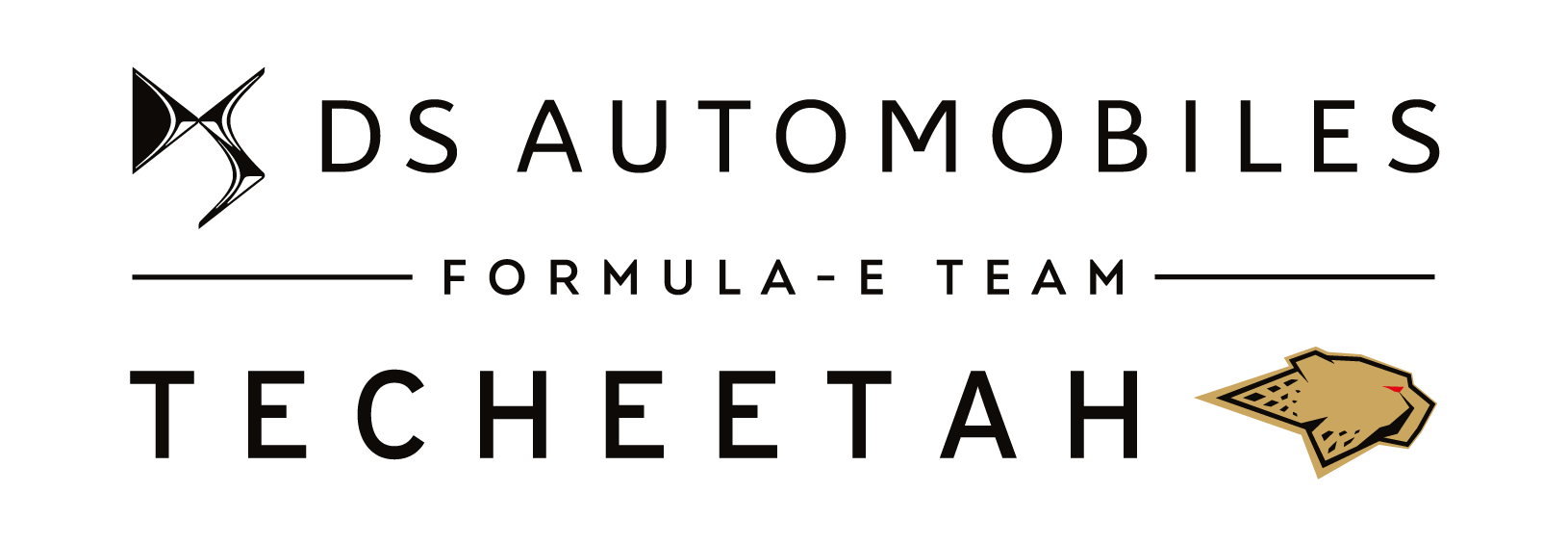
- Founded: 2013 (Note: Techeetah took over Team Aguri prior to the 2016–17 season rather than entering the sport as a new entity.)
- Folded: 2022
- Base: Shanghai, China
- Former series: Formula E
- Teams' Championships: FIA Formula E: 2018–19; 2019–20
- Drivers' Championships: FIA Formula E: 2017–18: Jean-Éric Vergne; 2018–19: Jean-Éric Vergne: 2019–20: António Félix da Costa
- Website: http://www.dstecheetah.com

DS Techeetah (/təˈtʃitə/, Chinese: DS钛麒; pinyin: DS tài qí) was a Sino-French motor racing team under ownership of SECA - China Media Capital that competed in the electric racing series, Formula E.

== Formula E ==
Team Aguri principal Aguri Suzuki announced he would leave the team in April 2016 as senior personnel entered "a period of consultation" over a future change in ownership. In the week before the 2016 London ePrix, the Chinese public equity and venture capital firm China Media Capital announced its purchase of Team Aguri and established a new entity named Techeetah in its place. Senior personnel from Team Aguri, including team principal Mark Preston, retained their jobs with Techeetah, and the cars ran a custom Renault powertrain.

=== 2016–17 season ===
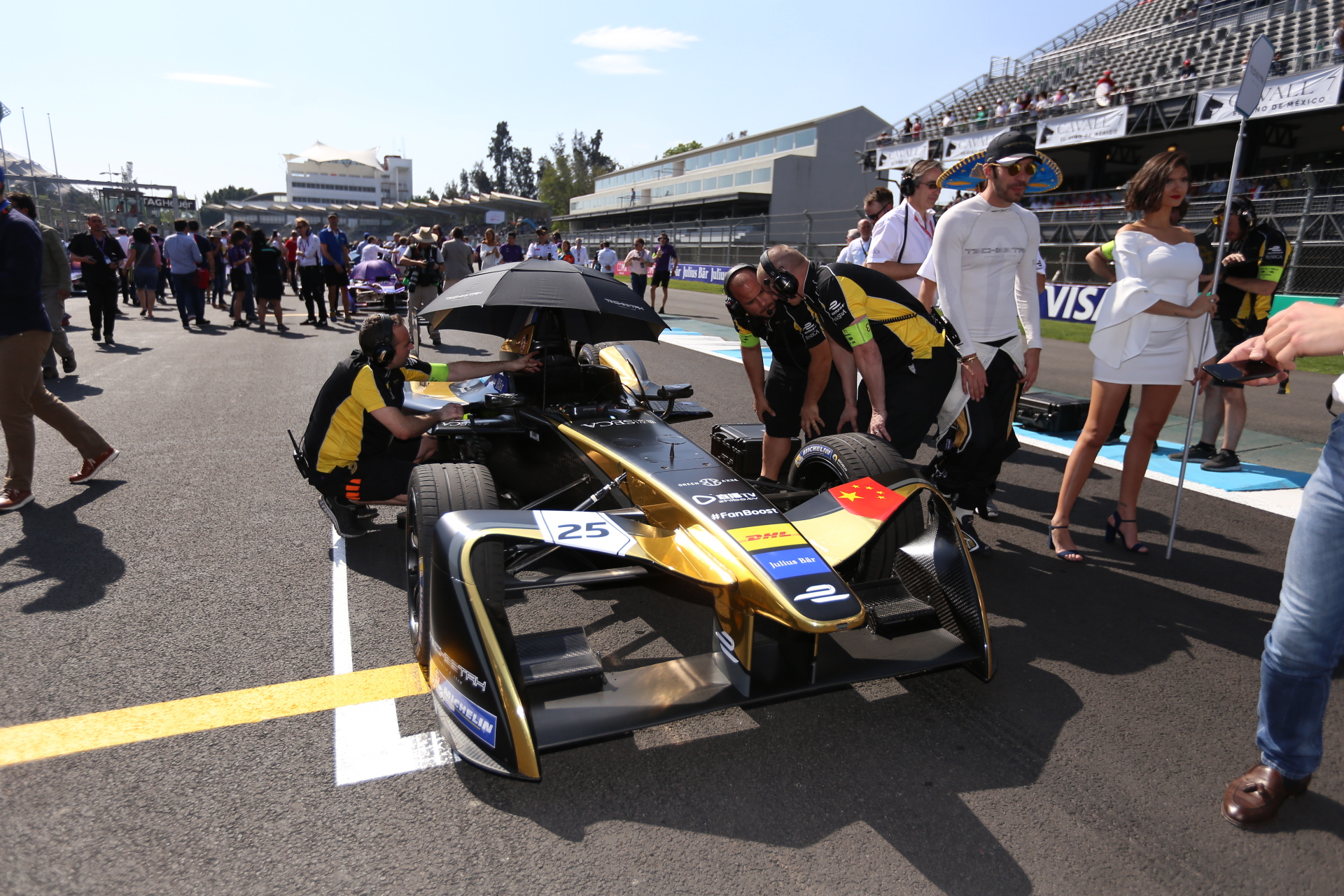
Jean-Éric Vergne before the start of the 2017 Mexico City ePrix.

The team entered the sport following the acquisition of Team Aguri in 2016. In July 2016, Jean-Éric Vergne and Qinghua Ma (who competed with Team Aguri in the final rounds of the previous season prior to CMC's takeover) were confirmed as the team's drivers. With Renault providing powertrains for Techeetah's debut season, Vergne scored the team's maiden podium with a second place at the Buenos Aires ePrix. In March 2017, Techeetah announced former F1 driver Esteban Gutiérrez would replace Ma from round four onwards. However, after Gutiérrez left the team after only three races after being given an opportunity with Dale Coyne Racing to compete in the IndyCar Series, the team then signed Stéphane Sarrazin to compete with the team for the remainder of the season.

=== 2017–18 season ===
Techeetah signed André Lotterer to partner Vergne for its second season in the series. Vergne was supremely consistent over the whole course of the season, finishing on points in every race, accumulating 198 points and winning the Drivers' Championship. The team got overtaken by Audi at the last second, missing out on Teams' Championship by only two points.

=== 2018–19 season ===
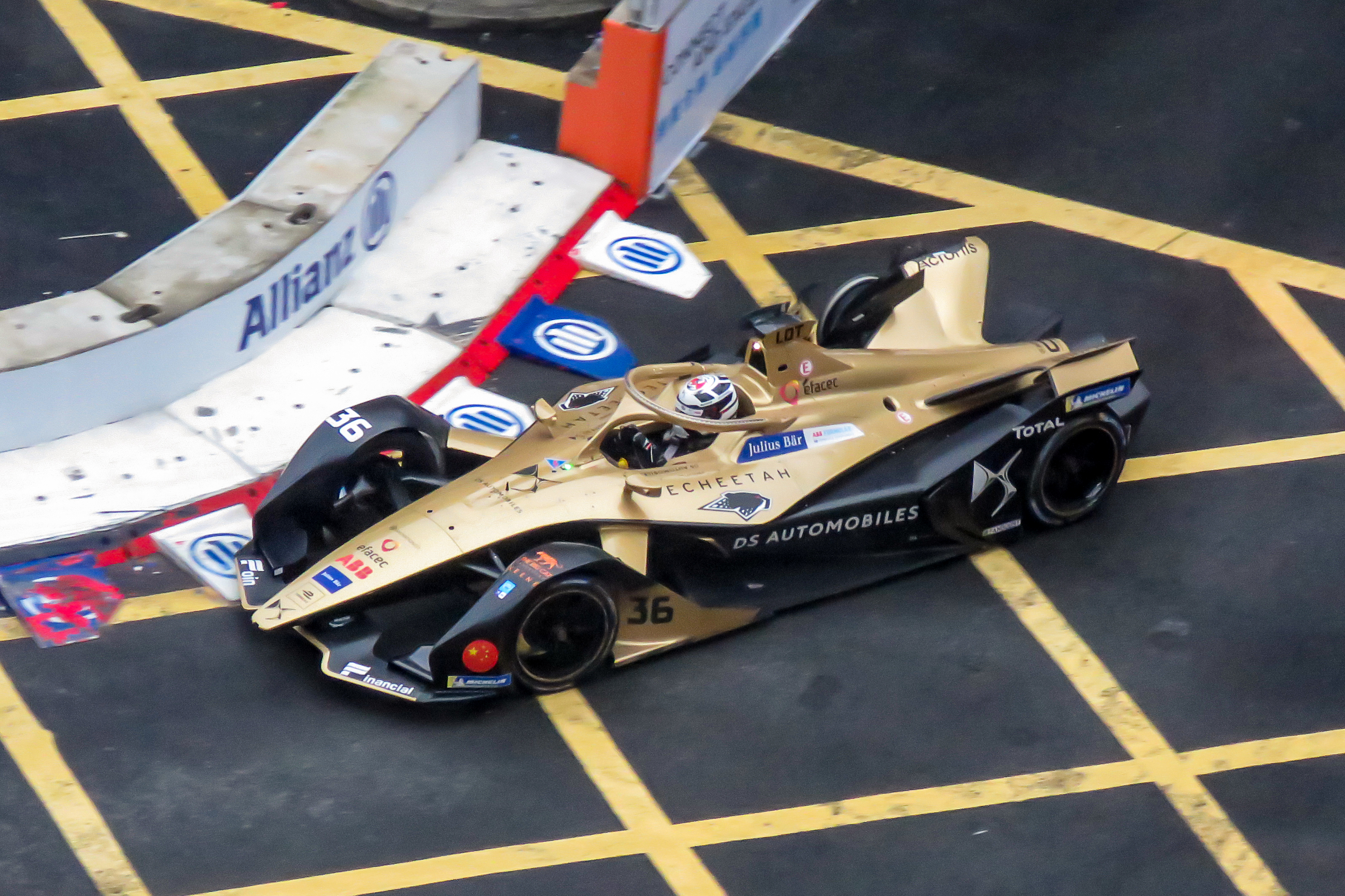
André Lotterer during the 2019 Hong Kong ePrix.

In July 2018, Peugeot Sport with DS Automobiles-rebadged partnered with Techeetah and the team renamed to DS Techeetah. Techeetah switched powertrain from Renault to DS Automobiles powertrain, which also makes Techeetah a manufacturer team with its own DS E-TENSE. In October 2018, DS Techeetah introduced its new headquarters in Versailles. James Rossiter and Zhou Guanyu were announced as the development drivers for Techeetah the 2018/2019 season.

Techeetah's other line-up remained unchanged for the 2018–19 season. After the first race in New York City, Jean-Éric Vergne secured enough points to become the Drivers' Champion, winning his second Formula E championship. Techeetah won their first ever team championship in Formula E. Lotterer subsequently left the team, switching to Porsche.

=== 2019–20 season ===
In September 2019, it was announced that António Félix da Costa would replace Lotterer in the team (as he had departed for the new Porsche Formula E Team). Vergne was set to continue with the team as he signed a long-term contract back in 2018.

=== 2021-2022 season ===
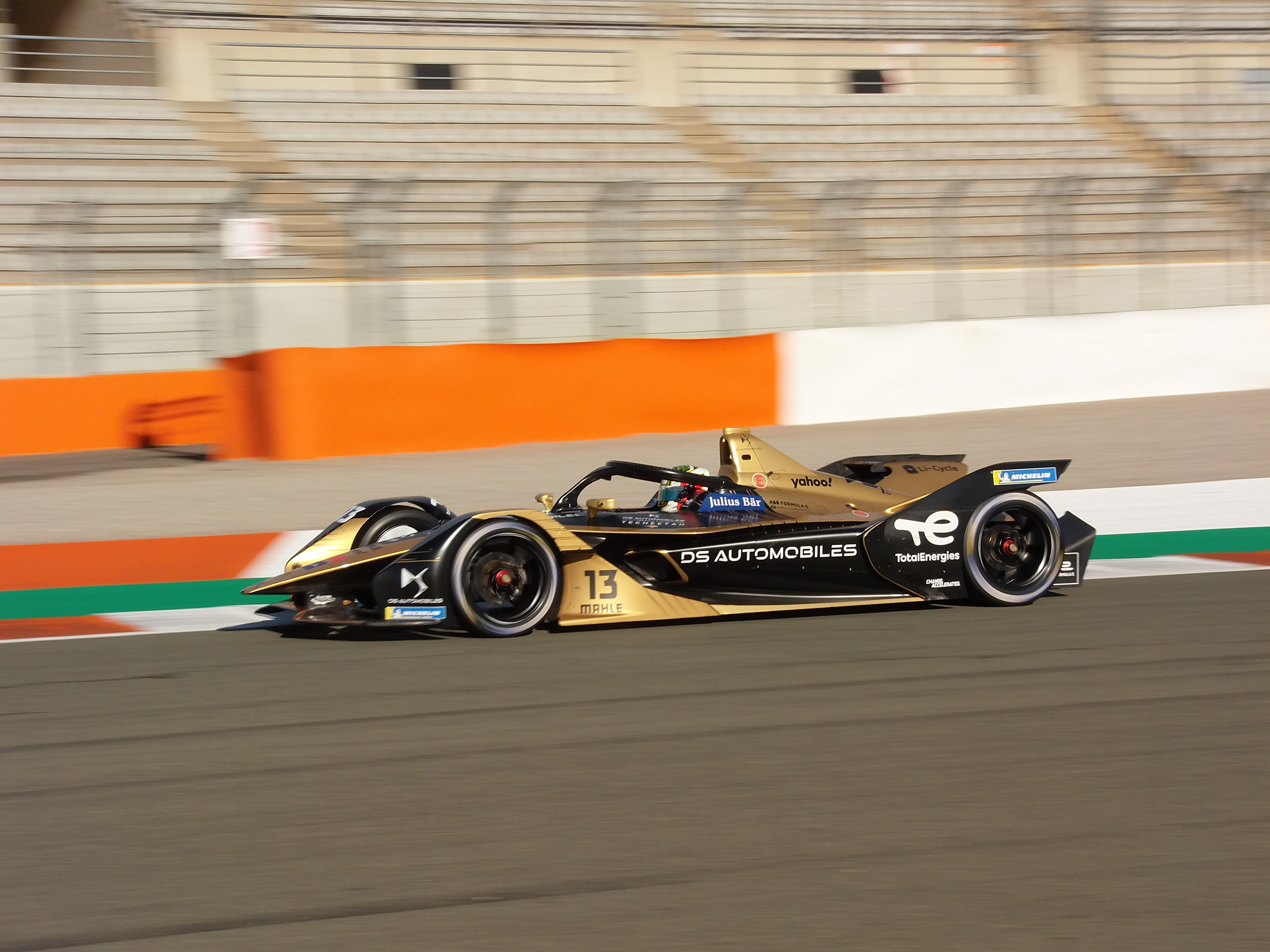
António Félix da Costa testing his Spark SRT05e in Valencia

In the 2021-2022 season DS Techeetah was registered as a French team, though the ownership were still under SECA and China Media Capital.

DS and Techeetah announced the end of their relationship after four seasons. DS would instead partner up with Penske (one of the partners of the former Dragon team). Vergne joined the newly formed DS Penske outfit alongside reigning champion Stoffel Vandoorne while Félix da Costa switched to TAG Heuer Porsche for the 2022–23 season, replacing André Lotterer and partnering Pascal Wehrlein.

=== Post 2021-2022 season ===
Techeetah missed the 2022–23 season, with a view to returning to the grid for the 2023–24 season. The team has not competed in Formula E since the start of the Gen 3 Era. Despite the team success, SECA failed to yield the expected investment or sell-on and that has ultimately led to it falling off the grid ahead of 2023.

== Records ==
DS Techeetah has earned various record results following the 2019/2020 season.

=== Team records ===
Most pole positions in a row in one season
| Driver | Race | Round |
|---|---|---|
| DAC | Marrakesh | S6RD5 |
| DAC | Berlin | S6RD6 |
| DAC | Berlin | S6RD7 |
| JEV | Berlin | S6RD8 |
| JEV | Berlin | S6RD9 |

First team to do two front row lock outs
| Season | Race | Team |
|---|---|---|
| S2 | Beijing | Renault e.DAMS |
| S2 | Punta del Este | Dragon Racing |
| S3 | Hong Kong | NEXTEV NIO |
| S5 | Paris | Nissan e.DAMS |
| S6 | Berlin RD6 | DS Techeetah |
| S6 | Berlin RD9 | DS Techeetah |

- It's the first time a team get the most points on 5 consecutive races in a single season.
- It’s the first time that team has led with more than 64 points
- First team to score a 1-2 finish (Santiago 2018)
- Second team to score all possible points in one race (Audi Sport Abt Schaeffler did previously in Berlin 2018)
- Second team to win it twice
- Second team to win it twice in a row
- Only team to have two champions
- First team to score 48pts in a single race
- 5 poles in a row
- Only team to have two 1-2 finishes / Santiago 18 (with Renault) and Berlin 20 (with DS)
- Only team to win both championships twice
- Only team to win both championships back to back
- Third team to do 3 consecutive wins for a team/manufacturer (shared with Audi and Renault)
- Only team to win Drivers and Teams championships before the last race (RD9 out of 11).
- Team with the largest lead to 2nd in the championship: 77 points

Season six saw the largest end of season gap in both Drivers (71 points) and Teams (77 points).

=== Driver records ===
António Félix da Costa

- Is now the first driver to win the Formula E championship with two races remaining.
- Is the only driver to have won the championship with two races to go
- Is the driver with the largest lead to 2nd : 71 points
- 3rd driver to do a hat-trick (Berlin RD 6 2020) shared with Sébastien Buemi and Daniel Abt
- 3 consecutive pole positions in a single season
- 3 consecutive wins (Season 6) shared with Sébastien Buemi
- First driver to receive an Order of Merit as a result of winning a championship

About Antonio's 2019/2020 Formula E season

Wins: 4 (3 consecutive)

Podiums: 9 (7 consecutive)

Pole positions: 5 (consecutive)

Fastest in qualifying groups: 4

Lap lead: 174

Jean-Éric Vergne

- First back to back champion
- Only driver to win the championship twice
- Was the only driver to have won the championship with one race to go before Jake Dennis achieved the feat in the 2022-23 Formula E season

== Jaguar I-Pace eTrophy ==
Techeetah became the first Formula E team to join the Jaguar I-Pace eTrophy support series, fielding one car for the inaugural 2018–19 season with Stefan Rzadzinski behind the wheel. The team competed under the name TWR Techeetah and was part of the Pro class. The eTrophy entry included an arrangement with Ryan Walkinshaw to return his late father Tom's TWR brand to international motorsport.

=== 2018–19 season ===
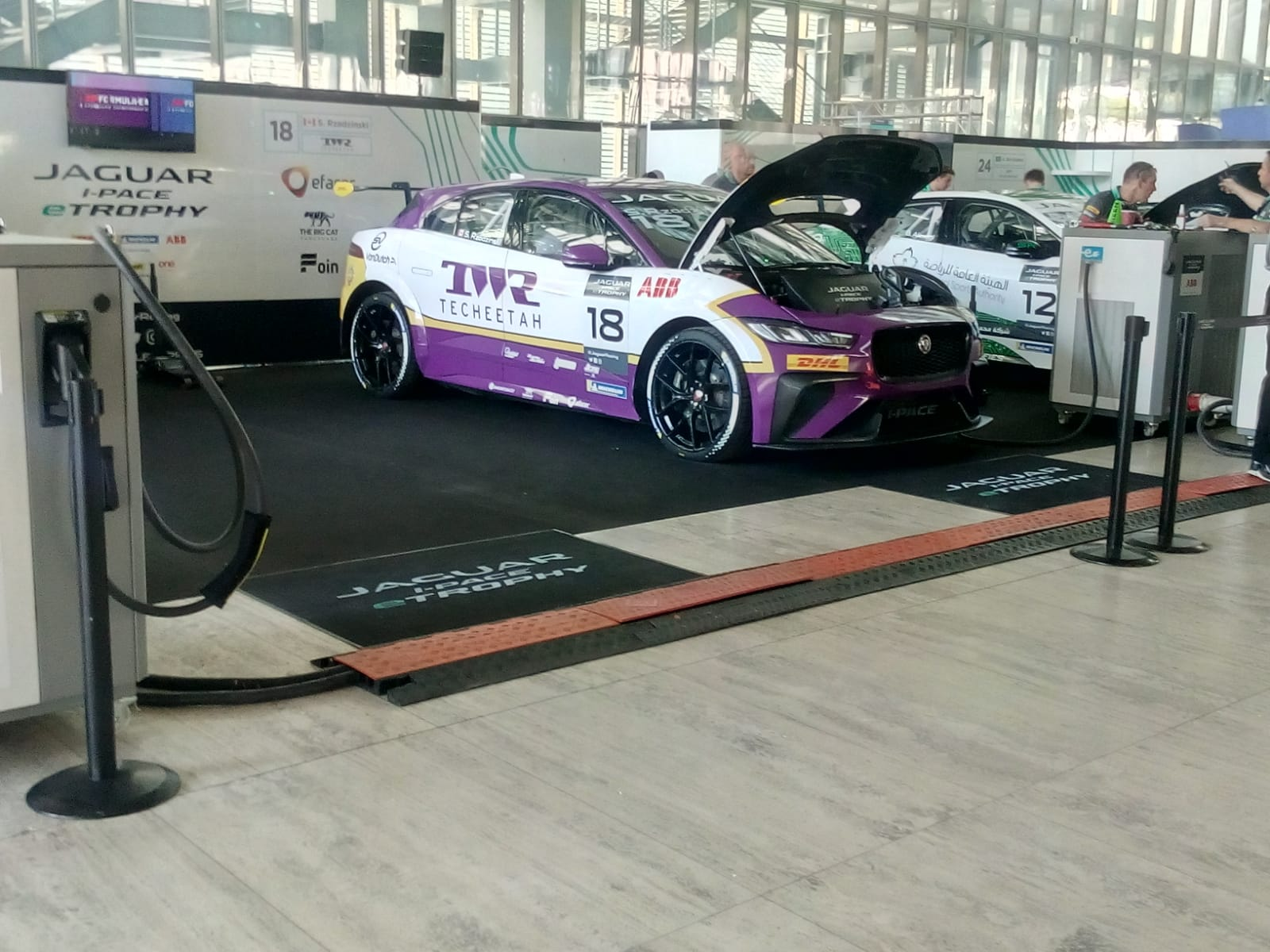
Stefan Rzadzinski's car at the 2019 Rome ePrix.

A plain white livery was used during the first round in Ad Diriyah. Before the second round in Mexico City, a retro Silk Cut-based livery was introduced, which has been in use ever since. Rzadzinski's deal with the team came to end before the Berlin ePrix. Former Panasonic Jaguar Racing driver and 2008–09 A1GP champion Adam Carroll was announced as his replacement. The team, however, completely withdrew from the following round held in New York City.

The team's best result came at the Paris ePrix, where Rzadzinski finished second. For the majority of the season, the TWR Techeetah team was consistently behind the likes of Jaguar Brazil Racing and Rahal Letterman Lanigan Racing, whose drivers were regularly competing for wins. It was also the only team in the Pro class to not win a race during the season.

== Results ==
=== Formula E ===
2015–16: Team Aguri
| Year | Chassis | Powertrain | Tyres | No. | Drivers | 1 | 2 | 3 | 4 | 5 | 6 | 7 | 8 | 9 | 10 | 11 | 12 | 13 | 14 | 15 | 16 | Points | T.C. |
(China) Techeetah
| 2016–17 | Spark SRT01-e | Renault Z.E. 16 | M | | | HKG | MRK | BUE | MEX | MCO | PAR | BER | | NYC | | MTL | | | | | | 156 | 5th |
| 2016–17 | Spark SRT01-e | Renault Z.E. 16 | M | 25 | (France) Jean-Éric Vergne | Ret | 8 | 2 | 2 | Ret | Ret | 8 | 6 | 2 | 8 | 2 | 1 | | | | | 156 | 5th |
| 2016–17 | Spark SRT01-e | Renault Z.E. 16 | M | 33 | (China) Ma Qinghua | Ret | 15 | 16 | | | | | | | | | | | | | | 156 | 5th |
| 2016–17 | Spark SRT01-e | Renault Z.E. 16 | M | 33 | (Mexico) Esteban Gutiérrez | | | | 10 | 8 | 12 | | | | | | | | | | | 156 | 5th |
| 2016–17 | Spark SRT01-e | Renault Z.E. 16 | M | 33 | (France) Stéphane Sarrazin | | | | | | | 11 | 14 | 3 | 12 | 3 | 8 | | | | | 156 | 5th |
| 2017–18 | Spark SRT01-e | Renault Z.E. 17 | M | | | HKG | | MRK | SCL | MEX | PDE | RME | PAR | BER | ZUR | NYC | | | | | | 262 | 2nd |
| 2017–18 | Spark SRT01-e | Renault Z.E. 17 | M | 18 | (Germany) André Lotterer | DSQ | 13 | Ret | 2 | 13 | 12 | 3 | 6 | 9 | 4 | 7 | 9 | | | | | 262 | 2nd |
| 2017–18 | Spark SRT01-e | Renault Z.E. 17 | M | 25 | (France) Jean-Éric Vergne | 2 | 4 | 5 | 1 | 5 | 1 | 5 | 1 | 3 | 10 | 5 | 1 | | | | | 262 | 2nd |
(China) DS Techeetah
| 2018–19 | Spark SRT05e | DS E-TENSE FE19 | M | | | ADR | MRK | SCL | MEX | HKG | SYX | RME | PAR | MCO | BER | BRN | NYC | | | | | 222 | 1st |
| 2018–19 | Spark SRT05e | DS E-TENSE FE19 | M | 25 | (France) Jean-Éric Vergne | 2 | 5 | Ret | 13 | 13 | 1 | 14 | 6 | 1 | 3 | 1 | 15 | 7 | | | | 222 | 1st |
| 2018–19 | Spark SRT05e | DS E-TENSE FE19 | M | 36 | (Germany) André Lotterer | 5 | 6 | 13 | 5 | 14 | 4 | 2 | 2 | 7 | Ret | 14 | 17 | Ret | | | | 222 | 1st |
| 2019–20 | Spark SRT05e | DS E-TENSE FE20 | M | | | DIR | | SCL | MEX | MRK | BER | | BER | | BER | | | | | | | 244 | 1st |
| 2019–20 | Spark SRT05e | DS E-TENSE FE20 | M | 13 | (Portugal) António Félix da Costa | 14 | 10^{G} | 2 | 2 | 1 | 1^{G} | 1 | 4 | 2 | Ret | 9 | | | | | | 244 | 1st |
| 2019–20 | Spark SRT05e | DS E-TENSE FE20 | M | 25 | (France) Jean-Éric Vergne | Ret | 8 | Ret | 4 | 3 | Ret | 10 | 3^{G} | 1^{G} | 18 | 7 | | | | | | 244 | 1st |
| 2020–21 | Spark SRT05e | DS E-TENSE FE20; DS E-TENSE FE21 | M | | | DIR | | RME | | VLC | | MCO | MEX | | NYC | | LDN | | BER | | | 166 | 3rd |
| 2020–21 | Spark SRT05e | DS E-TENSE FE20; DS E-TENSE FE21 | M | 13 | (Portugal) António Félix da Costa | 11 | 3 | Ret | 7 | DSQ | 22 | 1 | 6 | Ret | 12 | 3 | 8 | Ret | 7 | Ret | | 166 | 3rd |
| 2020–21 | Spark SRT05e | DS E-TENSE FE20; DS E-TENSE FE21 | M | 25 | (France) Jean-Éric Vergne | 15 | 12 | 1 | 11 | 9 | 7 | 4 | Ret | 8 | 2 | Ret | 12 | 12 | 6^{G} | 11 | | 166 | 3rd |
(France) DS Techeetah
| 2021–22 | Spark SRT05e | DS E-TENSE FE21 | M | | | DIR | | MEX | RME | | MCO | BER | | JAK | MRK | NYC | | LON | | SEO | | 266 | 3rd |
| 2021–22 | Spark SRT05e | DS E-TENSE FE21 | M | 13 | (Portugal) António Félix da Costa | Ret | 12 | 4 | 6 | 13 | 5 | 8 | 6 | 4 | 2 | Ret | 1 | 7 | 5 | 9 | 10 | 266 | 3rd |
| 2021–22 | Spark SRT05e | DS E-TENSE FE21 | M | 25 | (France) Jean-Éric Vergne | 8 | 6 | 3 | 4 | 2 | 3 | 2 | 9 | 2 | 4 | 18 | Ret | 14 | Ret | 6 | 6 | 266 | 3rd |

Notes

- ^{G} – Driver was fastest in group qualifying stage and was given one championship point.
- † – Driver did not finish the race, but was classified as he completed over 90% of the race distance.

=== Jaguar I-Pace eTrophy ===
| Year | Car | Class | Tyres | No. | Drivers | 1 | 2 | 3 | 4 | 5 | 6 | 7 | 8 | 9 | 10 | Points | D.C. |
TWR Techeetah
| 2018–19 | Jaguar I-PACE eTROPHY | P | M | | | ADR | MEX | HKG | SYX | RME | PAR | MCO | BER | NYC | | | |
| 2018–19 | Jaguar I-PACE eTROPHY | P | M | 18 | (Canada) Stefan Rzadzinski | 12^{6} | Ret | Ret | 3^{3} | 5^{5} | 2^{2} | 10^{5} | | WD | WD | 43 | 6th |
| 2018–19 | Jaguar I-PACE eTROPHY | P | M | 77 | (United Kingdom) Adam Carroll | | | | | | | | 5^{5} | WD | WD | 6 | 7th |

Notes

- † – Driver did not finish the race, but was classified as he completed over 90% of the race distance.
