= Circuito Monteblanco =

Spanish motorsport racing circuit

- Location: Highway A-49 Km.48 Huelva, Andalucia, Spain
- Coordinates: 37°21′33.01″N 6°33′56.33″W
- Broke ground: 2005
- Opened: 2006
- Length: 4.430 km (2.753 mi)
- Turns: 18

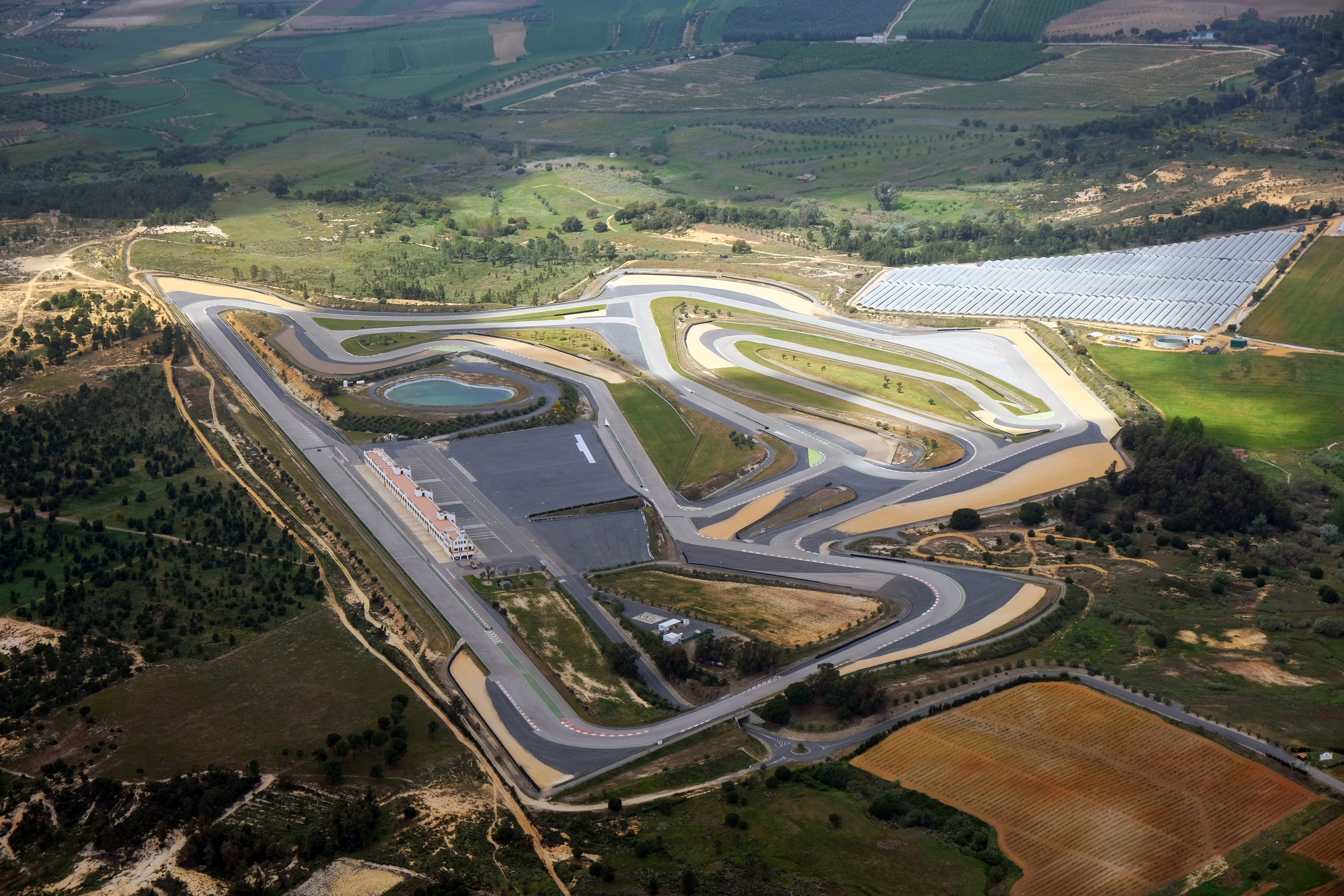
Satellite image of Circuito Monteblanco

Circuito Monteblanco is a Spanish motorsport racing circuit built in 2005-2006. It is located in the municipality of La Palma del Condado, a town in the province of Huelva, south of Spain, at the foot of the Autopista del Quinto Centenario (A-49, E-1), and is accessible via a network of road links with nearby major cities such as Seville or Faro (Portugal). Both cities have international airports.

In 2019, Formula E's all-electric autonomous feeder racing series Roborace raced here.

Monteblanco circuit is used for professional motorsport and motor industry events and testing programs.

== Facilities ==
=== Building ===
- A variety of function rooms from 110m2 and 340m2 of surface area
- Restaurant and café
- 24 modular pit-boxes equipped with monitors
- 4 hospitality rooms with direct access from the pit-box
- Race control room with CCTV and image recording system
- 27 cameras along the track for monitoring
- Timing system
- Fuelling station and car wash area

=== Track ===
- FIA homologated T1 (F1 Testing) & FIA Grade 2 (Races up to GP2)
- GP Circuit Length: 4,430 m
- 26 variants of circuit characteristics and different average speeds
- 12 possible combinations for simultaneous use of two completely independent tracks
- 3 independent pit-lanes
- Internal circuit of 1,437 m equipped with sprinklers and epoxy surface for wet weather testing conditions
- Maximum circuit length 4,730 m
- The length of the main straight: 960 m
- The width of the main straight: 15 m
- The rest of the circuit width: 13 m
- Corners: 19%
- Straights: 81%
- 4.4% maximum gradient
- 36,000 m2 of asphalt run-off area and 50,000 m2 of gravel beds

Multiple layouts are available dependent on which race series an event is for. It can be tailored to replicate all the different elements; fast, slow and medium corners as well as high speed sections. Polyvalent installations, offering multiple tracks, an urban circuit and maximum safety levels.

Twenty six different combinations can be designed for various testing requirements. It has got one of the highest FIA gradings available which means that Circuito Monteblanco can host anything apart from Formula 1 racing. Racing takes place at the track, with track days and testing accounting for a large proportion of its annual usage.

=== Paddock ===
33,000 m2 paddock divided into two zones for dynamic tests such as slalom, curve tracing, emergency braking, acceleration / traction, car dynamics (understeer / oversteer), wet skid control and stability control. The sprinkler system design offers wet weather conditions simulation and our 70m x 4m area of epoxy surface can be used to test braking without adhesion.

=== Testing ===
The design of Monteblanco includes 26 variants of track and 12 combinations for the use of two circuits simultaneously. Monteblanco, in addition to complying with the latest FIA specifications, with improvements in key points as the design of asphalt-gravel mixed loopholes, which increase the level of passive safety for motorcycles and cars. Its control system equipped with 27 video cameras allows continuous monitoring of track vehicles.
