= Formula E: Accelerate =

Formula E Esports

- 2021

Tournament information
- Sport: Formula E
- Dates: 28 January–25 March 2021
- Administrator: rFactor 2 Formula E
- Tournament formats: Open Qualifiers: Online; Entry Period: 7–13 January 2021; Top 3 fastest drivers will receive an invite to participate in Formula E Accelerate.; Race: Six race competition with each race lasts for 25 minutes
- Venue: Online

Final positions
- Champions: (Denmark) Frederik Rasmussen
- 1st runners-up: (North Macedonia) Erhan Jajovski
- 2nd runners-up: (Slovenia) Kevin Siggy

Formula E: Accelerate is a professional esports competition created by Formula E in 2021, following the success of 2020's event, the ABB Formula E Race at Home Challenge in support of UNICEF.

The competition is run on the platform rFactor 2 platform, with seat time at home for competitors, with additional venue events for some rounds. The championship grid is made up of esports teams associated with the manufacturers from the real-world ABB FIA Formula E World Championship, with drivers who are selected through early qualification rounds to represent those teams.

The competition is broadcast on various Formula E social and streaming platforms, such as Twitch, Facebook, and YouTube.

The championship offers a €100,000 prize-pool and some real-world seat-time with laps in a Gen2 Formula E car.

== 2021 ==
In the inaugural 2021 season, over 600 professional sim drivers in addition to plenty of talented gamers entered the qualifiers in January 2021, competing for seats in 12 official teams.

Danish sim racer Frederik Rasmussen was crowned as the 2021 Formula E: Accelerate Champion ahead of Erhan Jajovski, taking the €20,000 top prize and a drive in a real Gen2 Formula E car. ROKiT Venturi Racing secured the Teams' Championship Title, finishing 36 points clear of the field.

== 2022 ==
The 2022 season added VIP tickets to the Seoul e-Prix to the prize, this time with six rounds of the qualifying competitions, known as "the Road to the London Final," to reduce the field down to a conventional grid size matching the real-world series. This grid then raced at a final round held at the London e-Prix. The six qualifying rounds were held at the virtual versions of Rome, Monaco, Berlin, Jakarta, Vancouver, and New York. Frederik Rasmussen won driving for Dragon/Penske with Jarno Opmeer second for Mercedes-EQ.

== 2023 ==
For 2023 the prize pool was reduced to €40,000, with two open qualifying rounds taking place remotely at the virtual versions of Berlin and Rome, but on the same weeks as the real-world rounds. The top 88 drivers from open qualification will go forward into Qualifying races at the same circuits. The top 11 from each event will then make up the 22-car grid for the final to be held at the London e-Prix. The championship will use Gen 3 cars.

== Drivers ==
=== 2021 ===
Team	Race drivers		
Team	No.	Driver name	Rounds
(Germany) Audi Sport ABT Schaeffler	33; 11; 11	(Italy) Manuel Biancolilla (South Africa) Kelvin van der Linde (Germany) Michi Hoyer	All; 1–2, 5–6; 3–4
(United States) BMW i Andretti Motorsport	28; 27	(Slovenia) Kevin Siggy (Croatia) Petar Brljak	All; All
(China) DS Techeetah	25; 13	(Poland) Nikodem Wisniewski (France) Arthur Lehouck	All; All
(United States) Dragon / Penske Autosport	7; 6	(Denmark) Frederik Rasmussen (Bulgaria) Peyo Peev	All; All
(United Kingdom) Envision Virgin Racing	37; 4	(United Kingdom) Graham Carroll (Hungary) Tímea Bencsik	All; All
(United Kingdom) Jaguar Racing	10; 20	(Czech Republic) Martin Stefanko (Poland) Jakub Brzeziński	All; All
(India) Mahindra Racing	29; 94	(Finland) Olli Pahkala (Germany) Lucas Mueller	All; All
(Germany) Mercedes-Benz EQ Formula E Team	17; 5	(Netherlands) Jarno Opmeer (Netherlands) Bono Huis	All; All
(China) NIO 333 FE Team	88; 8	(Estonia) Risto Kappet (China) Jiayu Zhang	All; All
(France) Nissan e.dams	23; 22	(Germany) Marc Gassner (Germany) Jan von der Heyde	All; All
(Monaco) ROKiT Venturi Racing	71; 48	(North Macedonia) Erhan Jajovski (Austria) Lorenz Hörzing	All; 1, 3–6
(Germany) TAG Heuer Porsche Formula E Team	36; 99	(Germany) Marius Golombeck (Czech Republic) Jaroslav Honzík	All; All

== Calendar ==
=== 2021 ===
Round	ePrix	Circuit	Duration	Date	Broadcast
1	New York City ePrix	(United States) Brooklyn Street Circuit, Red Hook, Brooklyn, New York	25 Minutes	28 January	Formula E: Accelerate Round 1 Full Race on YouTube
2	Hong Kong ePrix	Hong Kong Central Harbourfront Circuit, Hong Kong	25 Minutes	4 February	Formula E: Accelerate Round 2 Full Race on YouTube
3	Berlin ePrix	(Germany) Tempelhof Airport Street Circuit, Berlin	25 Minutes	11 February	Formula E: Accelerate Round 3 Full Race on YouTube
4	Diriyah ePrix	(Saudi Arabia) Riyadh Street Circuit, Diriyah	25 Minutes	11 March	Formula E: Accelerate Round 4 Full Race on YouTube
5	Electric Docks	(United States) Lester Special – Electric Docks	25 Minutes	18 March	Formula E: Accelerate Round 5 Full Race on YouTube
6	Rome ePrix	(Italy) Circuito Cittadino dell'EUR, Rome	25 Minutes	28 March	Formula E: Accelerate Grand Final Full Race on YouTube

Note:
Fictional tracks are marked in cyan.

== Results ==
=== Season summary ===
Round	ePrix	Pole position	Fastest lap	Winning driver	Winning team
1	(United States) New York City ePrix	(North Macedonia) Erhan Jajovski	(Slovenia) Kevin Siggy	(North Macedonia) Erhan Jajovski	(Monaco) ROKiT Venturi Racing
2	Hong Kong ePrix	(North Macedonia) Erhan Jajovski	(Denmark) Frederik Rasmussen	(North Macedonia) Erhan Jajovski	(Monaco) ROKiT Venturi Racing
3	(Germany) Berlin ePrix	(Slovenia) Kevin Siggy	(Finland) Olli Pahkala	(Slovenia) Kevin Siggy	(United States) BMW i Andretti Motorsport
4	(Saudi Arabia) Diriyah ePrix	(Denmark) Frederik Rasmussen	(Germany) Marius Golombeck	(Denmark) Frederik Rasmussen	(United States) Dragon / Penske Autosport
5	(United States) Electric Docks	(Denmark) Frederik Rasmussen	(Poland) Jakub Brzeziński	(North Macedonia) Erhan Jajovski	(Monaco) ROKiT Venturi Racing
6	(Italy) Rome ePrix	(Denmark) Frederik Rasmussen	(Denmark) Frederik Rasmussen	(Denmark) Frederik Rasmussen	(United States) Dragon / Penske Autosport

Note:
Fictional tracks are marked in cyan.

== Championship standings ==
=== Scoring system ===
Points were awarded to the top 10 classified finishers in the race, three points for pole sitter and one point was given to the driver who set the fastest lap inside the top ten.

Position	1st	2nd	3rd	4th	5th	6th	7th	8th	9th	10th	Pole	FL
Points	25	18	15	12	10	8	6	4	2	1	3	1

In the event of a tie at the conclusion of the championship, a count-back system is used as a tie-breaker, with a drivers'/teams' best result used to decide the standings.

=== Drivers' Championship standings ===
Pos.	Driver	NYC (United States)	HKG (Hong Kong)	BER (Germany)	DIR (Saudi Arabia)	LES (United States)	RME‡ (Italy)	Points
1	(Denmark) Frederik Rasmussen	9	2^{F}	2	1^{P}	3^{P}	1^{P}^{F}	143
2	(North Macedonia) Erhan Jajovski	1^{P}	1^{P}	4	2	1	4	135
3	(Slovenia) Kevin Siggy	3^{F}	3	1^{P}	3	10	13	75
4	(United Kingdom) Graham Carroll	13	4	20	5	12	2	58
5	(Netherlands) Jarno Opmeer	6	14	14	10	5	3	49
6	(Poland) Nikodem Wisniewski	14	10	8	18	2	6	39
7	(Germany) Marius Golombeck	5	5	18	6^{F}	15	8	37
8	(Czech Republic) Martin Stefanko	20	8	5	7	6	9	32
9	(Italy) Manuel Biancolilla	2	DSQ	7	14	8	11	28
10	(Austria) Lorenz Hörzing	16	DNS	12	8	4	7	28
11	(Poland) Jakub Brzeziński	15	11	9	11	9^{F}	5	25
12	(Netherlands) Bono Huis	4	15	16	4	DSQ	16	24
13	(Croatia) Petar Brljak	18	7	3	9	13	14	23
14	(Estonia) Risto Kappet	8	6	6	13	22	17	20
15	(Germany) Marc Gassner	7	16	13	16	11	10	8
16	(Germany) Jan von der Heyde	10	12	23	22	7	15	7
17	(Finland) Olli Pahkala	11	9	10^{F}	12	19	12	4
18	(Germany) Lucas Mueller	12	18	11	19	DSQ	24	0
19	(France) Arthur Lehouck	24	13	Ret	15	21	18	0
20	(Bulgaria) Peyo Peev	17	19	21	17	14	19	0
21	(Hungary) Tímea Bencsik	23	21	15	23	16	21	0
21	(Czech Republic) Jaroslav Honzík	21	17	22	24	18	22	0
23	(South Africa) Kelvin van der Linde	19	22			17	20	0
24	(Germany) Michi Hoyer			17	21			0
25	(China) Jiayu Zhang	22	20	19	20	20	23	0
Pos.	Driver	NYC (United States)	HKG (Hong Kong)	BER (Germany)	DIR (Saudi Arabia)	LES (United States)	RME‡ (Italy)	Points

Colour	Result
Gold	Winner
Silver	2nd place
Bronze	3rd place
Green	Other points position
Blue	Other classified position
Blue	Not classified, finished (NC)
Purple	Not classified, retired (Ret)
Red	Did not qualify (DNQ)
Red	Did not pre-qualify (DNPQ)
Black	Disqualified (DSQ)
White	Did not start (DNS)
White	Race cancelled (C)
Blank	Did not enter
Annotation	Meaning
P	Pole position
F	Fastest lap

Note:

- ‡ – Double points were awarded in the last race at the Rome ePrix, Rome.

=== Teams' Championship standings ===
Pos.	Team	NYC (United States)	HKG (Hong Kong)	BER (Germany)	DIR (Saudi Arabia)	LES (United States)	RME‡ (Italy)	Points
1	(Monaco) ROKiT Venturi Racing	1^{P}	1^{P}	4	2	1	4	203
1	(Monaco) ROKiT Venturi Racing	16	DNS	12	8	4	7	203
2	(United States) Dragon / Penske Autosport	9	2^{F}	2	1^{P}	3^{P}	1^{P}^{F}	167
2	(United States) Dragon / Penske Autosport	17	19	21	17	14	19	167
3	(United States) BMW i Andretti Motorsport	3^{F}	3	1^{P}	3	10	13	134
3	(United States) BMW i Andretti Motorsport	18	7	3	9	13	14	134
4	(Germany) Mercedes-Benz EQ Formula E Team	4	14	14	4	5	3	97
4	(Germany) Mercedes-Benz EQ Formula E Team	6	15	16	10	DSQ	16	97
5	(United Kingdom) Envision Virgin Racing	13	4	15	5	12	2	79
5	(United Kingdom) Envision Virgin Racing	23	21	20	23	16	21	79
6	(United Kingdom) Jaguar Racing	15	8	5	7	6	5	59
6	(United Kingdom) Jaguar Racing	20	11	9	11	9^{F}	9	59
7	(Germany) TAG Heuer Porsche Formula E Team	5	5	18	6^{F}	15	8	58
7	(Germany) TAG Heuer Porsche Formula E Team	21	17	22	24	18	22	58
8	(China) DS Techeetah	14	10	8	15	2	6	49
8	(China) DS Techeetah	24	13	Ret	18	21	18	49
9	(Germany) Audi Sport ABT Schaeffler	2	22	7	14	8	11	34
9	(Germany) Audi Sport ABT Schaeffler	19	DSQ	17	21	17	20	34
10	(France) Nissan e.dams	7	12	13	16	7	10	25
10	(France) Nissan e.dams	10	16	23	22	11	15	25
11	(China) NIO 333 FE Team	8	6	6	13	20	17	24
11	(China) NIO 333 FE Team	22	20	19	20	22	23	24
12	(India) Mahindra Racing	11	9	10^{F}	12	19	12	13
12	(India) Mahindra Racing	12	18	11	19	DSQ	24	13
Pos.	Team	NYC (United States)	HKG (Hong Kong)	BER (Germany)	DIR (Saudi Arabia)	LES (United States)	RME‡ (Italy)	Points

Colour	Result
Gold	Winner
Silver	2nd place
Bronze	3rd place
Green	Other points position
Blue	Other classified position
Blue	Not classified, finished (NC)
Purple	Not classified, retired (Ret)
Red	Did not qualify (DNQ)
Red	Did not pre-qualify (DNPQ)
Black	Disqualified (DSQ)
White	Did not start (DNS)
White	Race cancelled (C)
Blank	Did not enter
Annotation	Meaning
P	Pole position
F	Fastest lap

Note:

- ‡ – Double points were awarded in the last race at the Rome ePrix, Rome.
- The standings are sorted by best result, rows are not related to the drivers. In case of tie on points, the best positions achieved determined the outcome.
