= 2019 Hong Kong ePrix =

Race 5 of 13 of the 2018–19 Formula E season
← Previous race	Next race →
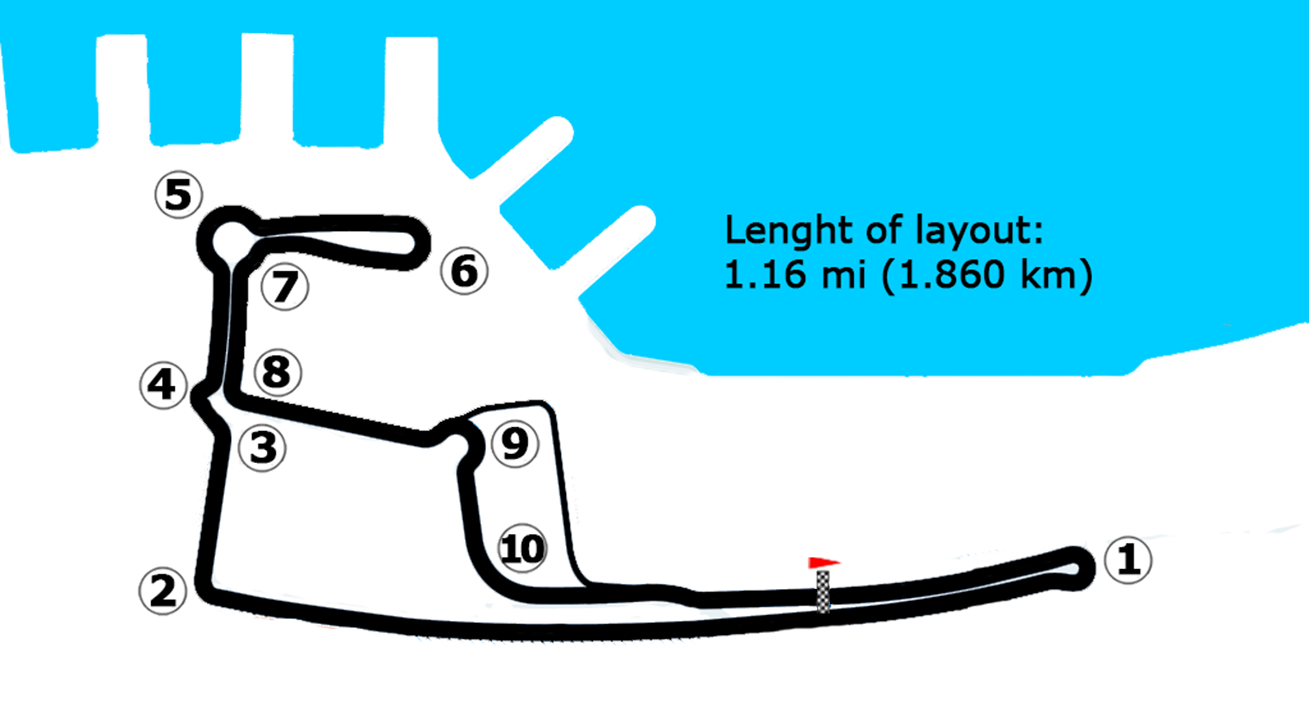

Race details
- Date: 10 March 2019
- Official name: 2019 HKT Hong Kong E-Prix
- Location: Hong Kong Central Harbourfront Circuit, Hong Kong
- Course: Street circuit
- Course length: 1.860 km (1.155 miles)
- Weather: Cloudy

Pole position
Driver	(Belgium) Stoffel Vandoorne	HWA-Venturi
- Time: 1:11.580

Fastest lap
Driver	(Germany) André Lotterer	Techeetah-DS
- Time: 1:02.317 on lap 28

Podium
First	(Switzerland) Edoardo Mortara	Venturi
Second	(Brazil) Lucas Di Grassi	Audi
Third	(Netherlands) Robin Frijns	Virgin-Audi

The 2019 Hong Kong ePrix (formally the 2019 HKT Hong Kong E-Prix) was a Formula E electric motor race held at the Hong Kong Central Harbourfront Circuit in Hong Kong on 10 March 2019. It was the fifth race of the 2018–19 Formula E season, and the 50th Formula E ePrix running overall.

== Report ==
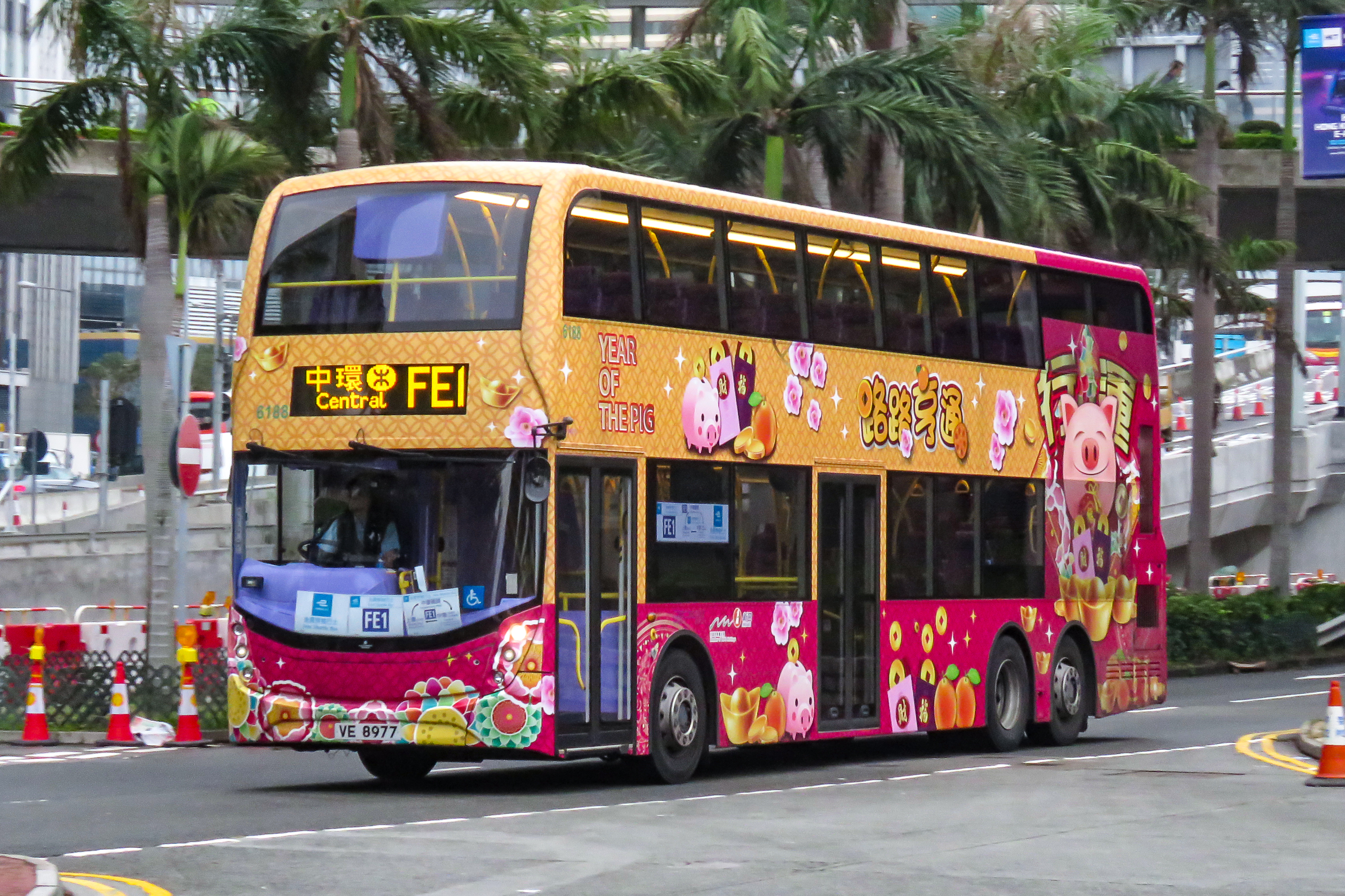
New World First Bus operates the temporary free shuttle route FE1 due to the closure of several roads in Central on Mar 9 and 10th.

=== Background ===
The Hong Kong ePrix was confirmed as part of Formula E's 2018–19 series schedule on June 7, 2018, by the FIA World Motor Sport Council. They were the fifth of thirteen scheduled single-seater electric car races of the 2018–19 season, and the third running of the event. It was held again at Hong Kong Central Harbourfront Circuit, located in the southern part of Hong Kong.

Coming into Hong Kong, Jérôme d'Ambrosio is leading the Drivers' Championship with 53 points, seven points ahead from BMW Andretti driver António Félix da Costa in second, after finishing 4th on the last race in Mexico City, and in third is Sam Bird with 45 points, only one point behind António Félix da Costa. In the Teams' Championship, Mahindra Racing is leading with 83 points; Virgin Racing just 10 points behind in second, and BMW Andretti in third with 64 points.

The 2019 Hong Kong ePrix would celebrate the 50th ePrix in Formula E history.

=== Practice ===
Two practice sessions—both on Saturday morning—were held before the late afternoon race. The first session ran for 45 minutes and the second for half an hour. Early morning showers saw the drivers head out on to a damp track for the first practice session, with the drivers fighting hard to keep the cars off the wall. During the session, Oliver Rowland led the way during the first Practice session after setting a time of 1:09.283, ahead of both DS Techeetah driver Andre Lotterer and his teammate Jean-Éric Vergne. During the session, several competitors ran deep into the run-off area. The notable incidents happened when Virgin Racing driver Sam Bird slide himself into the wall at turn 2, and Frijns clipped the inside wall at the penultimate corner. Gary Paffett had a driveshaft problem at the end of Practice 1.

The second practice session was underway an hour and a half later, with the track still in the damp condition after another rain came down between the first and second practice session. Virgin Racing driver Robin Frijns was the fastest in the second Practice session setting a lap time of 1:09.221, ahead from Rowland in second and Lotterer in third. Venturi driver Edoardo Mortara stopped on track due to a technical issue, just a few minutes into the session, and the Jaguar driver Mitch Evans had to stop as well with an issue at turn 6.

=== Qualifying ===
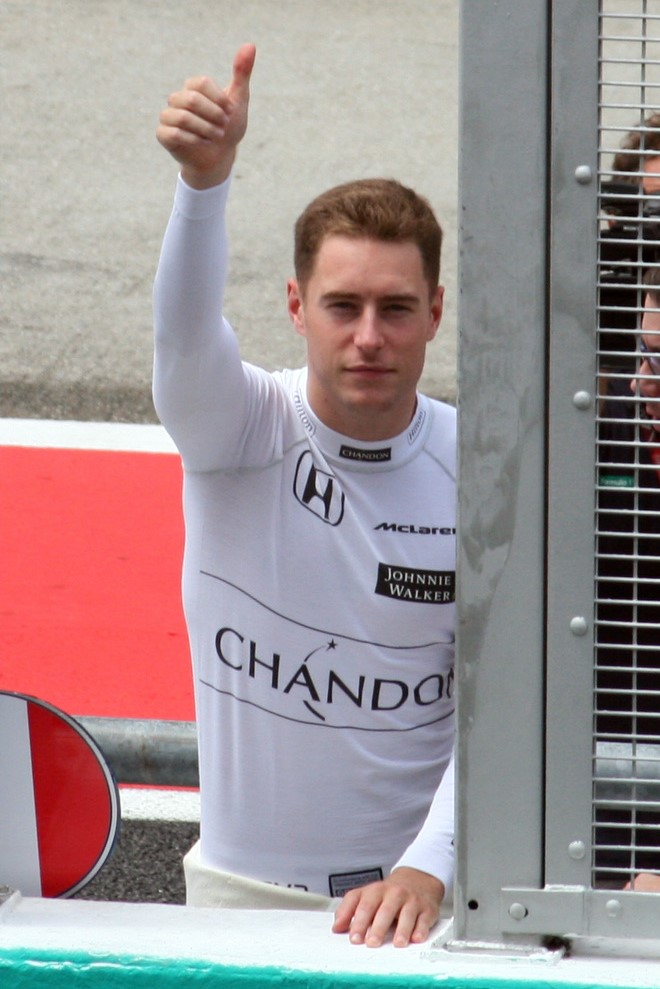
Stoffel Vandoorne (pictured in 2017 while driving in Formula One for McLaren-Honda) took his first pole position of his career and picks up his first points of the season.

Sunday's 75-minute afternoon qualifying session was divided into two groups of five cars and two groups of six entries. Each group was determined by championship standing and was permitted six minutes of on-track activity. All drivers were limited to two timed laps with one at maximum power. The fastest six overall competitors in the four groups participated in a "Super Pole" session with one driver on the track at any time going out in reverse order from six to first. Each of the six drivers was limited to one timed lap and the starting order was determined by the competitor's fastest times (Super Pole from first to six, and group qualifying from seventh to twenty-second). The driver and team who recorded the fastest time were awarded three points towards their respective championships.

In group one, Audi driver Lucas Di Grassi was fastest, ahead of Bird, and Da Costa. Both Mahindra driver, Pascal Wehrlein and Jerome d'Ambrosio, will start the Hong Kong ePrix from the back of the grid. Mortara is fastest in group two, with Lotterer joining him in the top 6 of overall qualifying session. The reigning champion Jean-Éric Vergne crossed the finish line backwards and hitting the wall, causing a red flag during the group two qualifying session. His best qualifying session was deleted by the stewards decision, and he would start in 18th. In the third group, Rowland set the fastest lap, ahead of his teammate Sébastien Buemi, which he missed out of the top six. Felipe Massa and Daniel Abt were third and forth in the group three, ahead of BMW Andretti driver Alexander Sims and the NIO driver of Oliver Turvey. In group four, Stoffel Vandoorne in the HWA Racelab set the overall fastest lap of the group qualifying, with his teammate Gary Paffett came in second, pushing Bird and Buemi out of the top six. Into the Super Pole session, Vandoorne took his first Pole Position of his career with a 1-minute and 11.58 seconds, and collected first points for HWA Racelab. He would start on the front row with Oliver Rowland, who is 0.323 seconds slower. Mortara set the third fastest lap, with Lotterer in forth, and Paffett in fifth. Sixth-placed man Di Grassi runs too deep at turn two.

=== Post-qualifying ===
After qualifying, Mortara received three place grid penalty and was demoted to sixth place on the grid for speeding under the red flag during group qualifying. This promoted Lotterer, Paffett and Di Grassi to third, forth and fifth place respectively.

=== Race ===
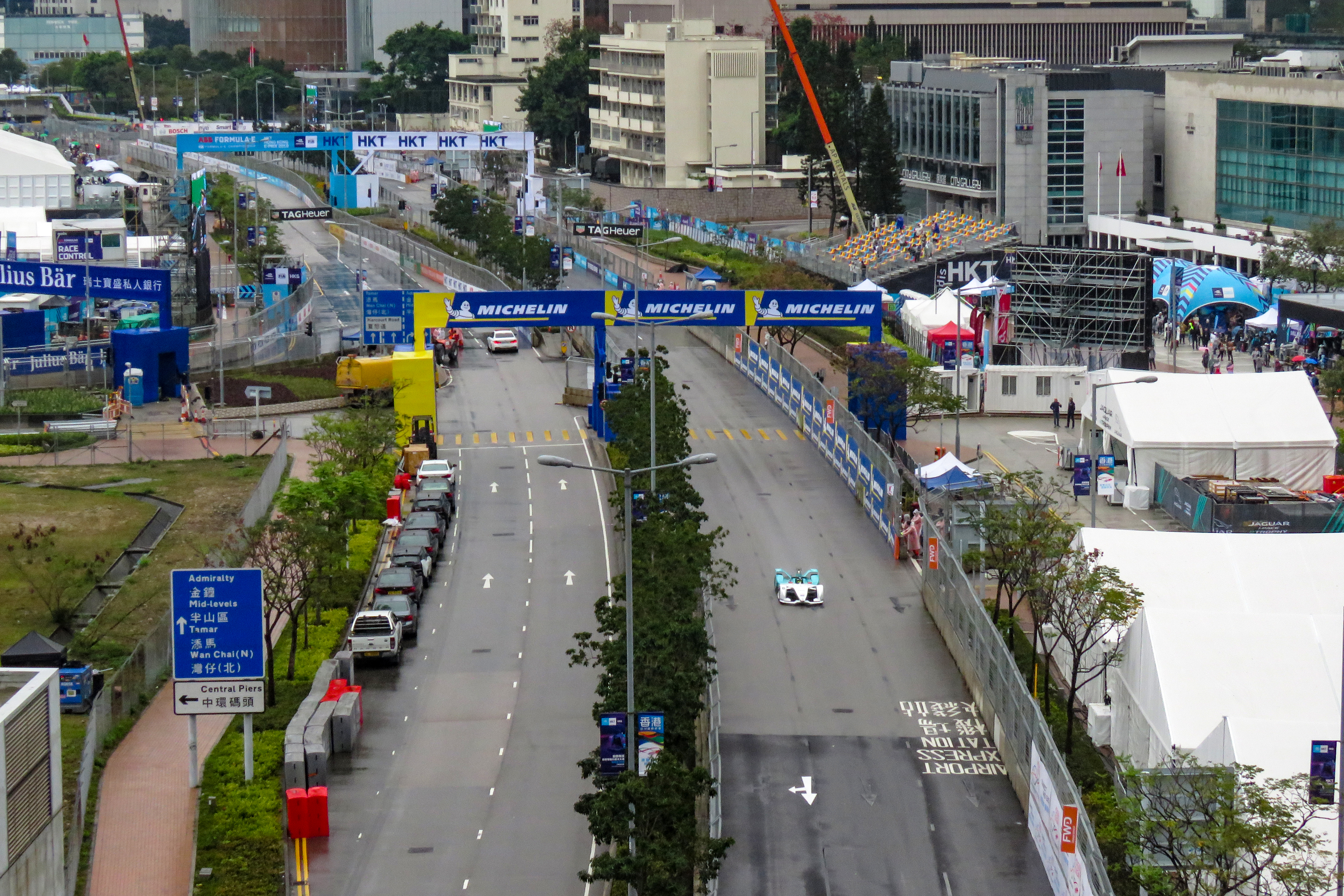
Lung Wo Road on the day of the race.

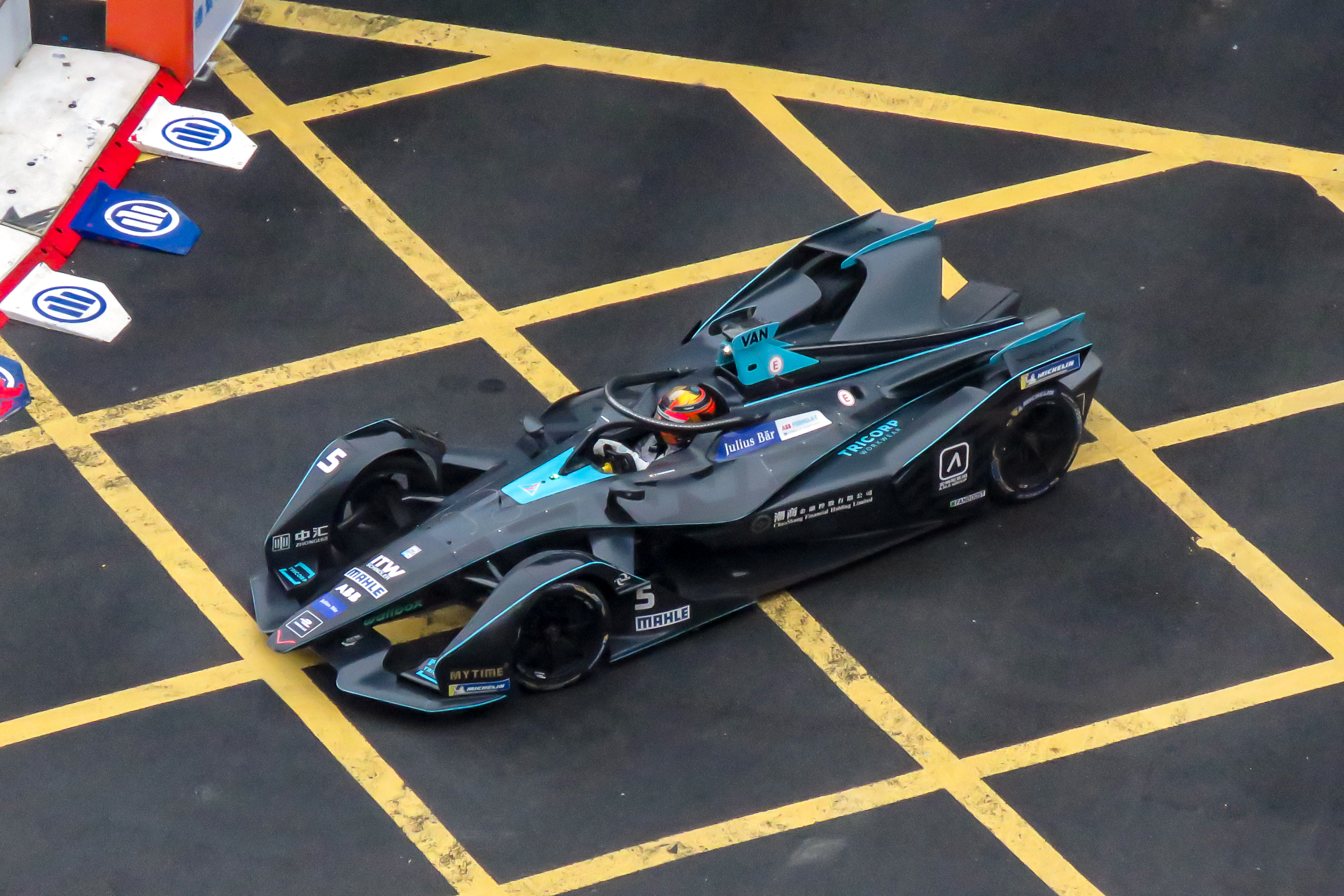
Stoffel Vandoorne at the intersection of Lung Wo Rd and Man Yiu St.

The race began at 16:03 Hong Kong Time (UTC+08:00). Weather conditions at the start of the race were wet. The air temperature throughout ranged from 18.44 to 18.72 °C (65.19 to 65.69 °F) and the track temperature stayed at 19 °C. Each driver was mandated to activate the attack mode system twice and were permitted to arm the system no more than five times. A special feature of Formula E is the "Fan Boost" feature, an additional 25 kW (34 hp) of power to use during the race's second half. The five drivers who were allowed to use the boost were determined by a fan vote. For the Hong Kong race, Vandoorne, Félix da Costa, Abt, Buemi, and Wehrlein were handed the extra power. Rowland took the lead from Vandoorne at the start, as Bird climbed up the order and came fourth at the first corner.

Just minutes in, Dragon driver Felipe Nasr went into the wall at Turn 2, with both Mahindra drivers d'Ambrosio and Wehrlein colliding into Nasr, ending all three drivers' races within the first five minutes and causing the full course yellow to be deployed followed by the Safety Car. The race was temporarily stopped under the red flag with Rowland leading ahead of Bird in second place. With the clock reset to just under 36 minutes remaining, most of the field took their first "attack mode" activation immediately prior to the restart. Rowland led for a lap before losing the lead to Bird when he accidentally pressed the Full Course Yellow speed limiter button at Turn 1, dropping him to 10th. Bird led a lap, before he went too deep at Turn 2 and lost a position to Lotterer. The two drivers battled hard for the win.

With less than 18 minutes left, Vandoorne stopped at Turn 6, suffering a driveshaft problem, while Buemi picked up damage to his left front wheel through the chicane, ending his race early. To recover Vandoorne's car from the track, the race director ordered the safety car to be deployed. The race restarted with 11 minutes left to go with Lotterer still leading, Bird close behind in second, and Mortara in third. Further down the pack, Rowland stopped on track after snapping his rear axle following contact with the wall. The Safety Car was deployed again to recover Rowland's car.

The race restarted again with less than two minutes to go. At Turn 2 on the penultimate lap, Bird made contact with the back of Lotterer's car, puncturing his tyre. Lotterer dropped to last position in 14th, with Bird leading to what could have been his second win of the season. Behind Bird came Mortara in second and Di Grassi in third. Abt and Massa finished in fourth and fifth respectively, with Evans, Paffett, Turvey, and Da Costa completing the top 10. The final finishers were Lopez, Dillmann, Vergne, and Lotterer.

=== Post-race ===
Three hours after the race, the FIA stewards gave Bird a five-second time penalty for causing a collision with Lotterer, dropping Bird to 6th. With the result, Mortara took the win of the 50th ePrix, followed by Audi driver Di Grassi in second and Frijns in third.

The result put Bird into the Drivers' Championship lead with 54 points but only one point ahead of d'Ambrosio. Mortara's victory enabled him to move into fourth position with 52 points, tied with Di Grassi. Virgin Racing led the Teams' Championship with 97 points. Venturi's result moved them into fourth in the Teams' Championship with 66 points, one point ahead of BMW Andretti in fifth place. Techeetah fell to sixth while Audi took second place after both drivers finished in the points. The race also set the record for the most number of retirees (8).

== Classification ==
=== Qualifying ===
Pos.	No.	Driver	Team	Time	Gap	Grid
1	5	(Belgium) Stoffel Vandoorne	HWA-Venturi	1:11.580	-	1
2	22	(United Kingdom) Oliver Rowland	e.Dams-Nissan	1:11.903	+0.323	2
3	48	(Switzerland) Edoardo Mortara	Venturi	1:12.310	+0.730	6^{1}
4	36	(Germany) Andre Lotterer	Techeetah-DS	1:12.868	+1.288	3
5	17	(United Kingdom) Gary Paffett	HWA-Venturi	1:13.033	+1.453	4
6	11	(Brazil) Lucas Di Grassi	Audi	1:14.177	+2.597	5
7	2	(United Kingdom) Sam Bird	Virgin-Audi	1:12.529	—	7
8	23	(Switzerland) Sébastien Buemi	e.Dams-Nissan	1:12.529	+0.000	8
9	19	(Brazil) Felipe Massa	Venturi	1:12.570	+0.041	9
10	4	(Netherlands) Robin Frijns	Virgin-Audi	1:12.600	+0.071	10
11	8	(France) Tom Dillmann	NIO	1:12.839	+0.310	11
12	66	(Germany) Daniel Abt	Audi	1:12.850	+0.321	12
13	27	(United Kingdom) Alexander Sims	Andretti-BMW	1:12.861	+0.332	13
14	7	(Argentina) José María López	Dragon-Penske	1:13.073	+0.544	14
15	3	(Brazil) Nelson Piquet Jr.	Jaguar	1:13.421	+0.892	15
16	6	(Brazil) Felipe Nasr	Dragon-Penske	1:13.885	+1.356	16
17	20	(New Zealand) Mitch Evans	Jaguar	1:13.920	+1.391	17
18	25	(France) Jean Eric Vergne	Techeetah-DS	1:13.927^{2}	+1.398	18
19	16	(United Kingdom) Oliver Turvey	NIO	1:14.133	+1.604	19
20	28	(Portugal) Antonio Felix da Costa	Andretti-BMW	1:14.384	+1.855	20
21	94	(Germany) Pascal Wehrlein	Mahindra	1:14.830	+2.301	21
22	64	(Belgium) Jérôme d'Ambrosio	Mahindra	1:15.347	+2.818	22

Notes

- ^1 — Edoardo Mortara received a 3-place grid penalty for speeding under red flag during group qualifying.
- ^2 — Jean Eric Vergne's best lap time were deleted for causing red flag.

=== Race ===
Pos.	No.	Driver	Team	Laps	Time/Retired	Grid	Points
1	48	(Switzerland) Edoardo Mortara	Venturi	36	59:36.119	6	25
2	11	(Brazil) Lucas di Grassi	Audi	36	+0.988	5	18
3	4	(Netherlands) Robin Frijns	Virgin-Audi	36	+1.536	10	15
4	66	(Germany) Daniel Abt	Audi	36	+1.985	12	12
5	19	(Brazil) Felipe Massa	Venturi	36	+3.258	9	10
6	2	(United Kingdom) Sam Bird	Virgin-Audi	36	+3.306^{2}	7	8+1^{3}
7	20	(New Zealand) Mitch Evans	Jaguar	36	+4.017	17	6
8	17	(United Kingdom) Gary Paffett	HWA-Venturi	36	+4.368	4	4
9	16	(United Kingdom) Oliver Turvey	NIO	36	+5.624	19	2
10	28	(Portugal) António Félix da Costa	Andretti-BMW	36	+6.492	20	1
11	7	(Argentina) José María López	Dragon-Penske	36	+7.218	14	0
12	8	(France) Tom Dillmann	NIO	36	+7.825	11	0
13	25	(France) Jean-Éric Vergne	Techeetah-DS	36	+16.604^{2}	18	0
14	36	(Germany) André Lotterer	Techeetah-DS	36	+24.270	3	0
Ret	22	(United Kingdom) Oliver Rowland	e.Dams-Nissan	29	Accident	2	0
Ret	5	(Belgium) Stoffel Vandoorne	HWA-Venturi	20	Driveshaft	1	3^{4}
Ret	23	(Switzerland) Sébastien Buemi	e.Dams-Nissan	19	Suspension	8	0
Ret	27	(United Kingdom) Alexander Sims	Andretti-BMW	16	Accident	13	0
Ret	6	(Brazil) Felipe Nasr	Dragon-Penske	1	Collision	16	0
Ret	94	(Germany) Pascal Wehrlein	Mahindra	1	Collision	21	0
Ret	64	(Belgium) Jérôme d'Ambrosio	Mahindra	1	Collision	22	0
Ret	3	(Brazil) Nelson Piquet Jr.	Jaguar	1	Suspension	15	0

Notes

- ^2 — Sam Bird and Jean-Eric Vergne received five-second time penalty for causing a collision
- ^3 — Fastest lap.
- ^4 — Pole position.

== Standings after the race ==
Drivers' Championship standings

+/–	Pos	Driver	Points
1	1	(United Kingdom) Sam Bird	54
1	2	(Belgium) Jérôme d'Ambrosio	53
1	3	(Brazil) Lucas di Grassi	52
7	4	(Switzerland) Edoardo Mortara	52
3	5	(Portugal) António Félix da Costa	47

Teams' Championship standings

+/–	Pos	Constructor	Points
1	1	(United Kingdom) Virgin-Audi	97
3	2	(Germany) Audi Sport ABT Schaeffler	86
2	3	(India) Mahindra	83
3	4	(Monaco) Venturi	66
1	5	(United States) Andretti-BMW	65

Previous race: 2019 Mexico City ePrix	FIA Formula E Championship; 2018–19 season	Next race: 2019 Sanya ePrix
Previous race: 2017 Hong Kong ePrix	Hong Kong ePrix	Next race: N/A
