= Hong Kong Central Harbourfront Circuit =

Temporary race track in Hong Kong

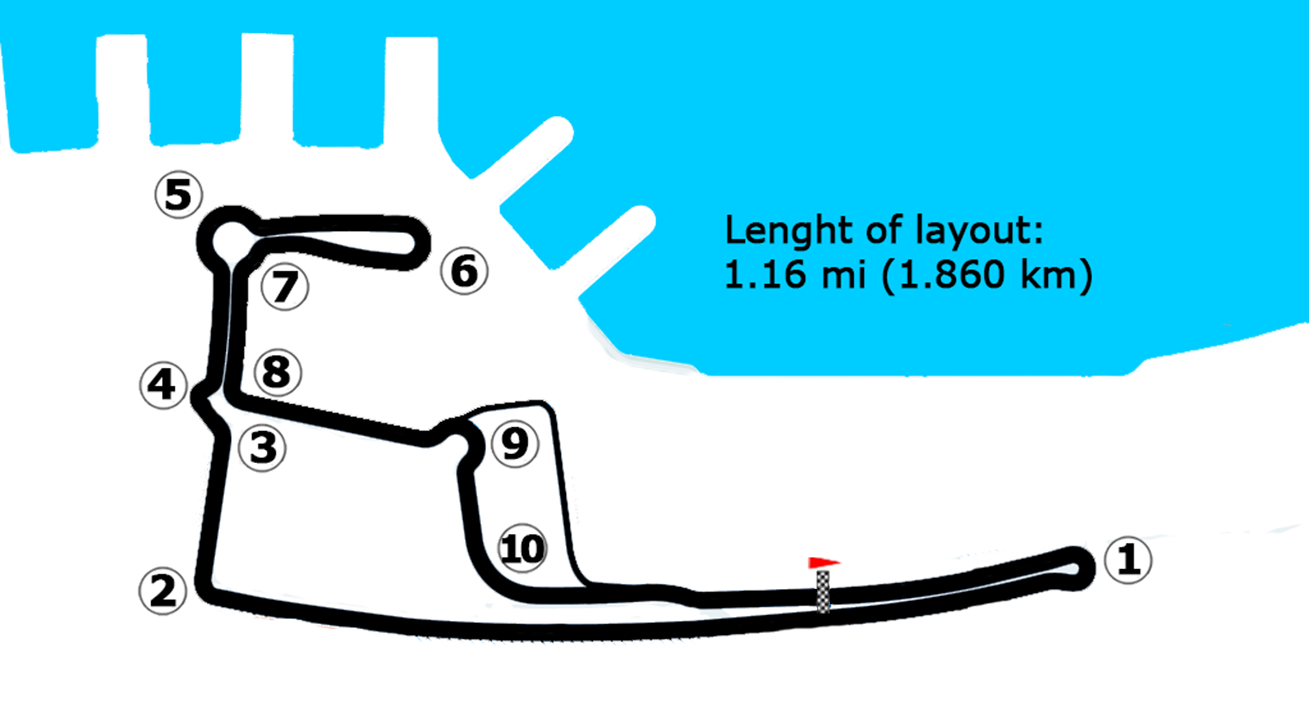
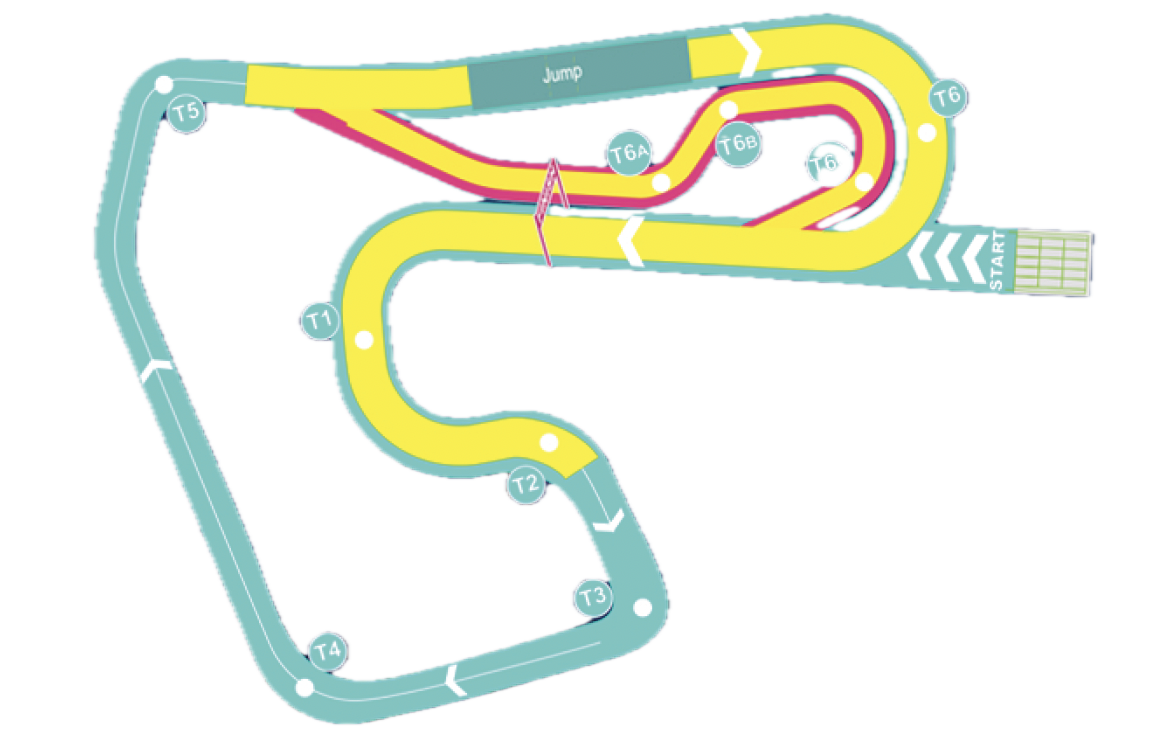
- Formula E circuit (2016–2019) Rallycross Circuit (2023)
- Location: Hong Kong
- Coordinates: 22°16′55″N 114°09′29″E
- FIA Grade: 6R
- Opened: 9 October 2016; 9 years ago
- Closed: 12 November 2023; 2 years ago
- Major events: Former: Formula E Hong Kong ePrix (2016–2017, 2019); Jaguar I-Pace eTrophy (2019); FIA World RX; World RX of Hong Kong, China (2023)

Street Circuit (2016–2019)
- Length: 1.860 km (1.156 mi)
- Turns: 10
- Race lap record: 1:02.317 ( (Germany) Andre Lotterer, DS E-Tense FE 19, 2019, F-E)

Rallycross Circuit (2023)
- Length: 0.802 km (0.498 mi)
- Turns: 6
- Race lap record: 0:35.673 ( (Sweden) Johan Kristoffersson, ZEROID X1, 2023, RX1e)

The Hong Kong Central Harbourfront Circuit is a street circuit on the Central Harbourfront on Hong Kong Island, Hong Kong, facing the Victoria Harbour. A 1.860 km (1.156 mi) layout was used between 2016 and 2019 for the Hong Kong ePrix of the single-seater, electrically powered Formula E championship. Its first use was on 9 October 2016, as the opening ePrix of the 2016–17 Formula E season and its last use being on 10 March 2019. A 0.802 km (0.498 mi) rallycross circuit on the Harbourfront was separately designed for the FIA World Rallycross Championship in the season finale of its 2023 season.

== Events ==
=== Formula E ===
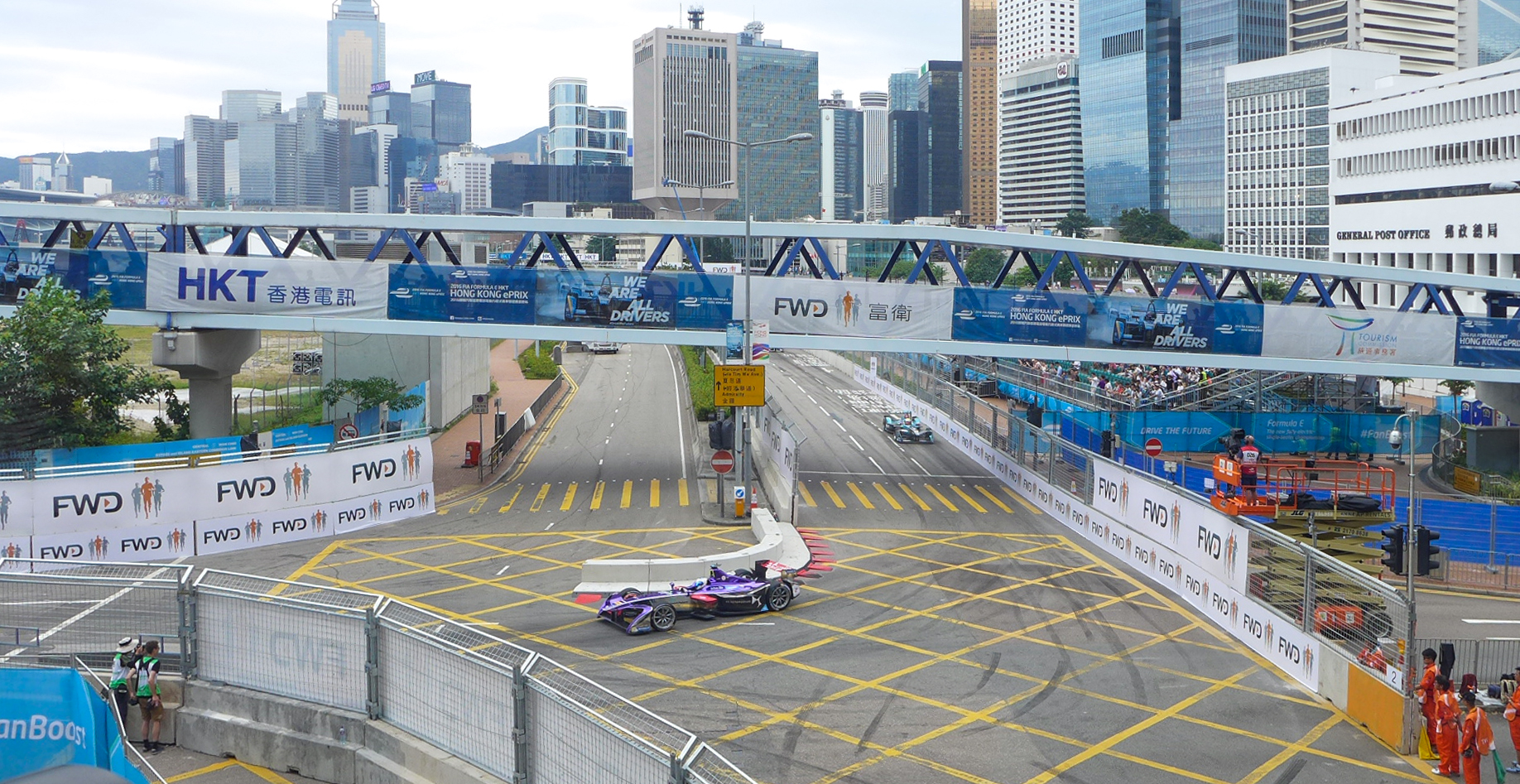
Formula E cars racing in 2016 Hong Kong ePrix

The circuit had been used to hold the Hong Kong ePrix in 2016, 2017 and 2019. A total of 4 races were held on this circuit in the 2016–17 season, 2017-18 season and the 2018–19 season.

The circuit failed to meet regulations set forth by the Fédération Internationale de l'Automobile (FIA). FIA regulations require tracks to be 2.2 km (1.4 mi) long but the Hong Kong Central Harbourfront Circuit was only 1.860 km (1.156 mi) long. The FIA required Hong Kong to extend the circuit to 2.2 km (1.4 mi) for the 2019–20 season, in which two more teams were expected to enter the E-Prix. Lawrence Yu, governor of the Hong Kong Automobile Association, cited difficulties in extending the track to the west as the Hong Kong station on the western side of the circuit links up the city with the airport. An extension to the east of the circuit through a tunnel was considered too dangerous for the cars to be running at high speeds along a straight road before they enter the tunnel.

The Hong Kong ePrix was eventually dropped from the 2019–20 season.

=== World Rallycross Championship ===
Hong Kong was selected to host the final two rounds of the 2023 season in World RX in March 2023. For the first time in the series' history, a 1.225 km (0.761 mi)-long street circuit was designed on the Central Harbourfront, using parts of public roads used by the Formula E circuit. Gravel sections of the rallycross circuit were laid on the Central Harbourfront Event Space. Last-minute track alterations were made one day prior to the race weekend owing to delay in track construction. The circuit was shortened to 0.802 km (0.498 mi) by dropping the two longest asphalt straights from the layout.

Hong Kong did not return to the 2024 calendar of World RX with the organiser reportedly HK$10 million owed in unpaid debt to suppliers.

== Lap records ==
As of November 2023, the fastest official race lap records at the Hong Kong Central Harbourfront Circuit are listed as:

Category	Time	Driver	Vehicle	Event
Formula E Circuit (2016–2019): 1.860 km (1.156 mi)
Formula E	1:02.317	Andre Lotterer	DS E-Tense FE 19	2019 Hong Kong ePrix
Jaguar I-Pace eTrophy	1:21.657	Bryan Sellers	Jaguar I-Pace eTrophy car	2019 Hong Kong Jaguar I-Pace eTrophy round
Rallycross Circuit (2023): 0.802 km (0.498 mi)
World RX	0:35.673	Johan Kristoffersson	ZEROID X1	2023 World RX of Hong Kong, China

== Race winners ==
Season	Date	Driver	Team	Race Distance		Race Time	Report
Season	Date	Driver	Team	Laps	Miles (km)	Race Time	Report
ABB FIA Formula E World Championship
2016	Oct 9	(Switzerland) Sebastian Buemi	e.DAMS Renault	45	51.795 (83.70)	53:13.298	Report
2017	Dec 2	(United Kingdom) Sam Bird	Virgin-Citroën	43	49.708 (79.98)	1:17:10.486	Report
2017	Dec 3	(Sweden) Felix Rosenqvist	Mahindra	45	51.795 (83.70)	50:05.084	Report
2019	Mar 10	(Switzerland) Edoardo Mortara	Venturi	36	41.616 (66.96)	59:36.119	Report
FIA World Rallycross Championship
2023	Nov 11	(Sweden) Kevin Hansen	Hansen	5	2.479 (3.990)	3:17:820	Report
2023	Nov 12	(Sweden) Johan Kristoffersson	Kristoffersson	5	2.479 (3.990)	3:09.300	Report
