= Hong Kong ePrix =

Formula E race

- Hong Kong Central Harbourfront Circuit (2016–2017, 2019)
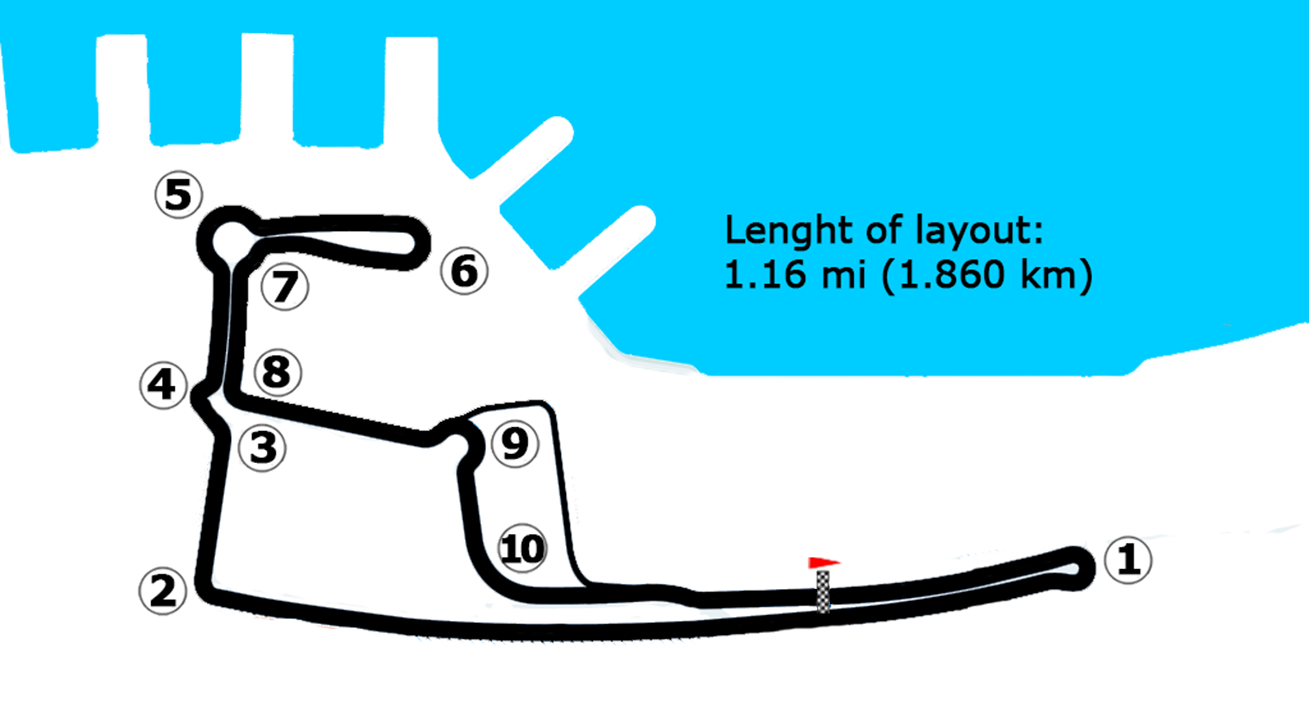

Race information
- Number of times held: 4
- First held: 2016
- Last held: 2019
- Circuit length: 1.860 km (1.156 miles)

Last race (2019)

Pole position
- (Belgium) S. Vandoorne; HWA-Venturi; 1:11.580

Podium
- 1. (Switzerland) E. Mortara; Venturi; 59:36.119; 2. (Brazil) L. di Grassi; Audi; +0.988; 3. (Netherlands) R. Frijns; Virgin-Audi; +1.536

Fastest lap
- (Germany) A. Lotterer; Techeetah; 1:02.317

The Hong Kong ePrix was an annual race of the single-seater, electrically powered Formula E championship, held at the Hong Kong Central Harbourfront Circuit in Hong Kong. The track was touted as a potential venue for the all-electric series’ inaugural race. It was first raced in the 2016–17 season as the first major international motorsport event in Hong Kong.

In its third run in the 2018–19 season, the 2019 Hong Kong ePrix became the 50th race of Formula E since the series' inception in 2014. It was widely expected to be the first wet race in Formula E racing history. Drivers tested the grip levels in both shakedown and practice sessions on a fully wet track, but it did not eventuate. The ePrix was subsequently dropped from the 2019–20 calendar.

== Circuit ==
The ten-turn 1.860 km (1.156 mi) circuit, located in the Central Harbourfront area is a firm favourite on the Formula E calendar. Making use of existing roads, all racing cars and drivers drive past landmarks including the International Finance Centre, Hong Kong Observation Wheel, and Hong Kong City Hall.

Significant portions of the track were covered with painted road signs, which could turn the race to extremely unexpected under serious rainy conditions according to some drivers. There were different tarmac and painted road markings around the circuit, which made some parts of the track slippery and treacherous on an adverse camber section. Still, the drainage is facilitated by the presence of concrete blocks with holes.

The circuit failed to meet regulations set forth by the Fédération Internationale de l'Automobile (FIA). FIA regulations require tracks to be 2.2 km (1.4 mi) long but the Hong Kong Central Harbourfront Circuit was only 1.860 km (1.156 mi) long. The FIA required Hong Kong to extend the circuit to 2.2 km (1.4 mi) for the 2019–20 season, in which two more teams were expected to enter the E-Prix. Lawrence Yu, governor of the Hong Kong Automobile Association, cited difficulties in extending the track to the west as the Hong Kong Station on the western side of the circuit links up the city with the airport. An extension to the east of the circuit through a tunnel considered too dangerous for the cars to be running at high speeds along a straight road before they enter the tunnel.

The Hong Kong ePrix was eventually dropped from the 2019–20 season.

== Results ==
Edition	Track	Winner	Second	Third	Pole position	Fastest lap	Ref
2016	Hong Kong Central Harbourfront Circuit	(Switzerland) Sébastien Buemi e.dams-Renault	(Brazil) Lucas di Grassi; Audi-ABT Schaeffler	(Germany) Nick Heidfeld; Mahindra	(Brazil) Nelson Piquet Jr. NextEV NIO	(Sweden) Felix Rosenqvist; Mahindra	
2017 Race 1	Hong Kong Central Harbourfront Circuit	(United Kingdom) Sam Bird; Virgin-DS	(France) Jean-Éric Vergne; Techeetah-Renault	(Germany) Nick Heidfeld; Mahindra	(France) Jean-Éric Vergne; Techeetah-Renault	(Belgium) Jérôme d'Ambrosio; Dragon-Penske	
2017 Race 2	Hong Kong Central Harbourfront Circuit	(Sweden) Felix Rosenqvist; Mahindra	(Switzerland) Edoardo Mortara; Venturi	(New Zealand) Mitch Evans; Jaguar	(Sweden) Felix Rosenqvist; Mahindra	(Brazil) Lucas di Grassi; Audi	
2019	Hong Kong Central Harbourfront Circuit	(Switzerland) Edoardo Mortara; Venturi	(Brazil) Lucas di Grassi; Audi	(Netherlands) Robin Frijns; Virgin-Audi	(Belgium) Stoffel Vandoorne; HWA-Venturi	(Germany) André Lotterer; Techeetah-DS	

== Controversy ==
With over 350 skyscrapers sitting on Hong Kong's shoreline, it was claimed several drivers encountered radio communication problems due to the buildings blocking the signal, which forced them to recalculate their energy management unassisted.
