= 2016 Hong Kong ePrix =

Race 1 of 12 of the 2016–17 Formula E Championship
Next race →
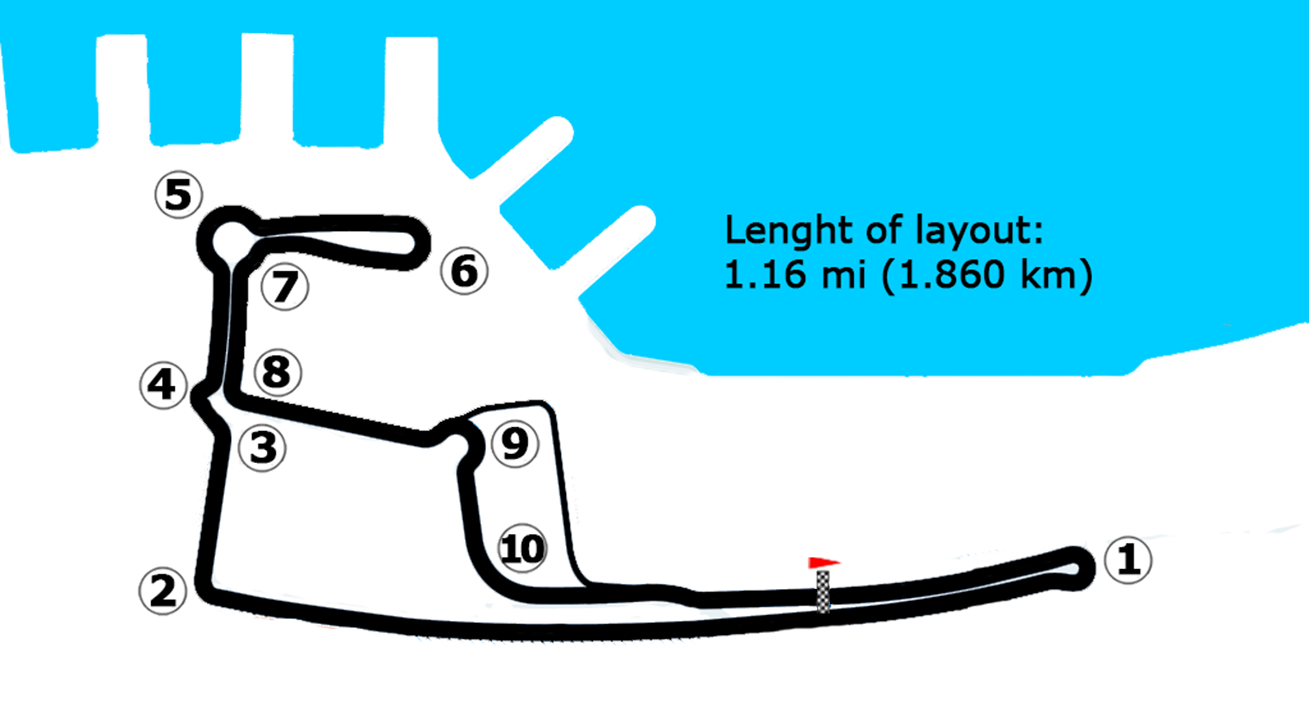

Race details
- Date: 9 October 2016
- Official name: 2016 FIA Formula E HKT Hong Kong ePrix
- Location: Hong Kong Central Harbourfront Circuit, Hong Kong
- Course: Street circuit
- Course length: 1.860 km (1.155 miles)
- Distance: 45 laps, 83.700 km (51.795 miles)
- Weather: Warm
- Attendance: 30,000

Pole position
Driver	(Brazil) Nelson Piquet Jr.	NextEV NIO
- Time: 1:03.099

Fastest lap
Driver	(Sweden) Felix Rosenqvist	Mahindra
- Time: 1:02.947 on lap 36

Podium
First	(Switzerland) Sébastien Buemi	e.Dams-Renault
Second	(Brazil) Lucas di Grassi	Audi Sport ABT
Third	(Germany) Nick Heidfeld	Mahindra

The 2016 Hong Kong ePrix (formally the 2016 FIA Formula E HKT Hong Kong ePrix for sponsorship purposes) was a Formula E electric motor race held at the Hong Kong Central Harbourfront Circuit in Hong Kong before a crowd of 30,000 people on 9 October 2016. It was the first race of the 2016–17 Formula E Championship and the first edition of the event. The 45-lap race was won by e.Dams-Renault driver Sébastien Buemi who started from seventh place. Audi Sport ABT's Lucas di Grassi finished second and Mahindra driver Nick Heidfeld was third.

Nelson Piquet Jr. won the pole position by recording the fastest lap in qualifying. He pulled away from the rest of the field and led until he collided with the barrier after swerving to avoid José María López's crashed car on the 17th lap allowing Sam Bird to take the lead. Some drivers elected to make pit stops to switch to their second cars with Bird choosing to remain on the circuit until his own stop eight laps later. He had technical problems with his second car and Buemi moved into the lead. Di Grassi was no more than two seconds behind Buemi but was unable to get close enough to challenge him because he had to conserve electrical energy and Buemi remained the leader for the rest of the race to win. There were three lead changes among four different drivers during the course of the race.

It was Buemi's first victory of the season and the seventh of his career. The result gave the Buemi of the Drivers' Championship with 25 points, seven ahead of di Grassi and ten in front of Heidfeld. Buemi's teammate Nico Prost was fourth on 12 points and António Félix da Costa was fifth with ten points. e.Dams-Renault held a 19-point advantage in the Teams' Championship over joint second-placed Audi Sport ABT and Andretti. Mahindra Racing were nine points ahead of the fifth-placed NextEV with eleven races left in the season.

== Background ==
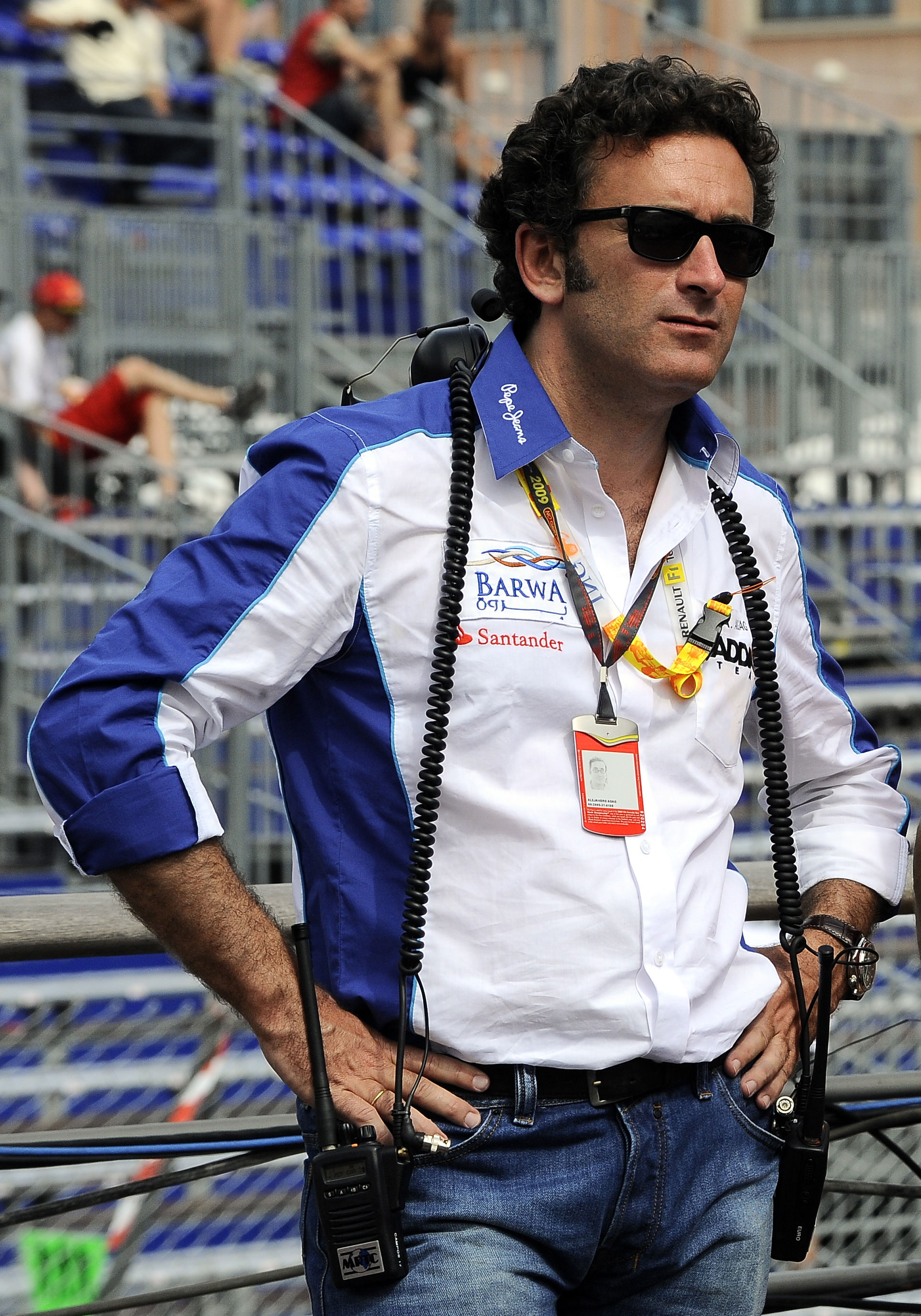
Alejandro Agag (pictured in 2009) publicly announced the Hong Kong ePrix in October 2015.

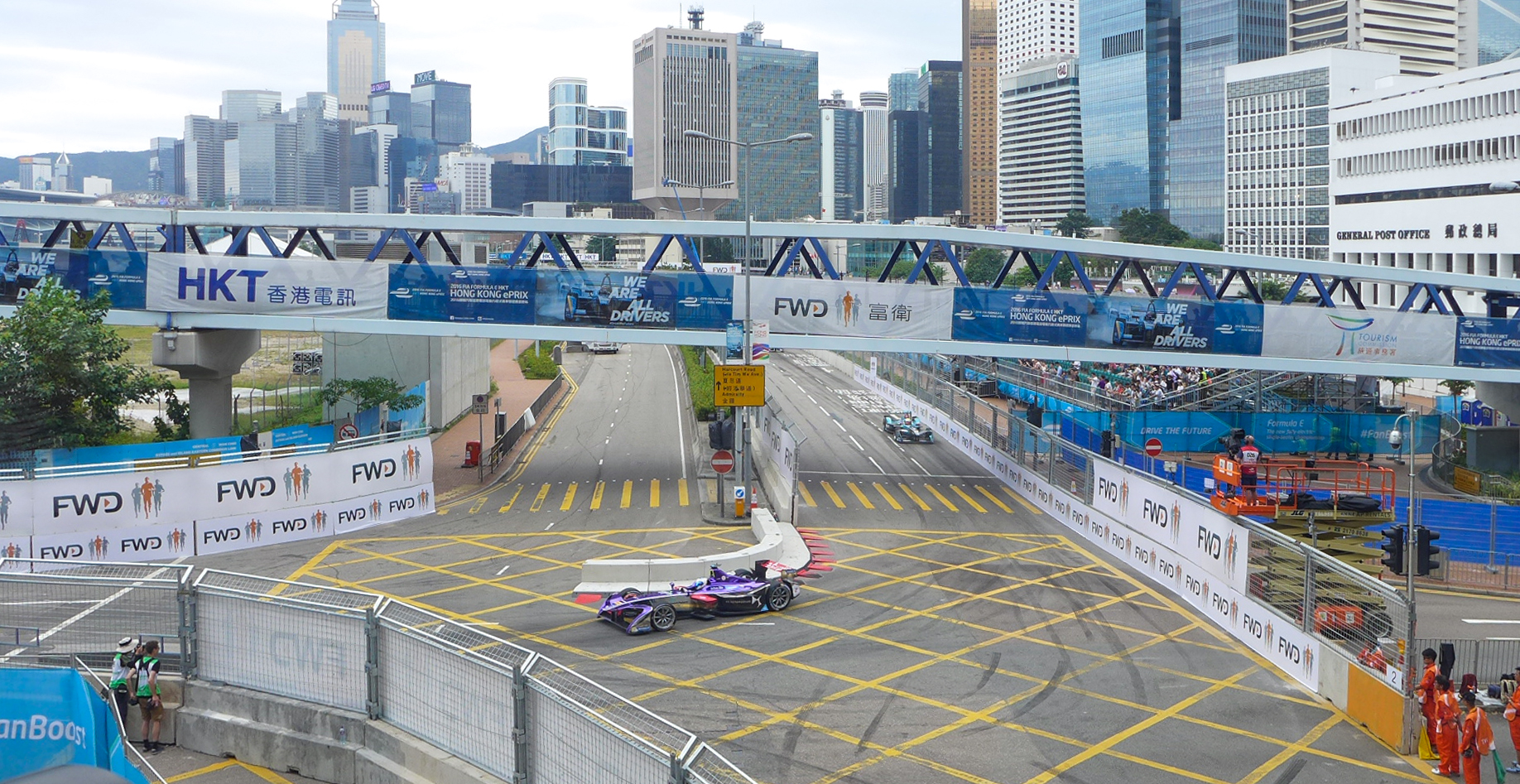
A scene from 2016 Hong Kong ePrix

The idea for a race in Hong Kong was first raised in 2013 when a design team visited the city. It was intended for inclusion in the 2014–15 season schedule but negotiations and approval from local authorities and motorsport's international governing body, the Fédération Internationale de l'Automobile (FIA), went longer than anticipated. In October 2015 the Hong Kong ePrix was announced by the CEO and founder of Formula E Alejandro Agag in a press conference at the Central Harbour Front Event Space, pending further review from the FIA. The event was later confirmed as part of Formula E's 2016–17 schedule in September 2016 by the FIA World Motor Sport Council. It was the first of 12 single-seater electric car races of the season, and was held at the Hong Kong Central Harbourfront Circuit on 9 October 2016. A total of ten squads entering two drivers each competed in the event.

Heading into the new season, some teams opted to keep the same line-up as they had in the previous season; however, some teams changed drivers. One of the main changes involved the début appearance of Jaguar in the sport with the 2008–09 A1 Grand Prix champion Adam Carroll and the 2012 GP3 Series title winner Mitch Evans competing for the team. Team Aguri was purchased by Chinese sports development and management firm SECA in mid-2016 and was renamed Techeetah with Jean-Éric Vergne and Ma Qinghua announced as the team's drivers. Defending FIA GT World Cup champion Maro Engel was hired by Venturi to replace World Endurance Championship driver Mike Conway, while Virgin employed three-time consecutive World Touring Car champion José María López to partner Formula E race winner Sam Bird. The final change involved two-time Macau Grand Prix winner and reigning European Formula Three champion Felix Rosenqvist joining the series with Mahindra, partnering Nick Heidfeld. Defending drivers' champion Sébastien Buemi stayed at e.Dams-Renault after his title-winning campaign, and was again joined by Nico Prost.

Buemi said the increase in competition for the championship's third season meant he was not thinking about the title but on winning as many races as possible. Audi Sport ABT's Lucas di Grassi, who finished second to Buemi in the previous season's drivers' championship, stated his team was highly motivated and aimed to win the championship after having placed third and second in the previous two seasons. He spoke of his feeling that the series was going to possibly experience "the most diverse and perhaps most exciting Formula E season.” Di Grassi said that his objective was to win the race and spoke of his astonishment if he became its inaugural winner. Heidfeld revealed that he was looking forward to the new season and aimed to help his team gain positions in the championship.

The 10-corner 1.860 km (1.156 mi) long track was designed by Rodrigo Nunes. It was constructed in eight days and was completed on the Friday before the event because the local authorities denied permission for the streets to be closed to traffic before that day. US$2.6 million (HK$20 million) was spent on relocating street lighting, cutting down trees, lowering underground facilities covers and converting existing roadside infrastructure. The circuit received positive feedback from drivers. Ma called the track "very exciting" and stated his belief that the race would see a large amount of overtakes. Rosenqvist said that he felt the track appeared "incredible" which went beyond his expectations. It reminded him more of American race circuits than the Guia Circuit and noted the track's bumpiness. Concerns were raised over the turn three chicane which had no kerbs or any visible markings. Heidfeld felt there was a risk of a driver crashing his car in the area with António Félix da Costa backing up his view and calling for the installation of tyres and observation of the turn's run-off area.

== Practice ==
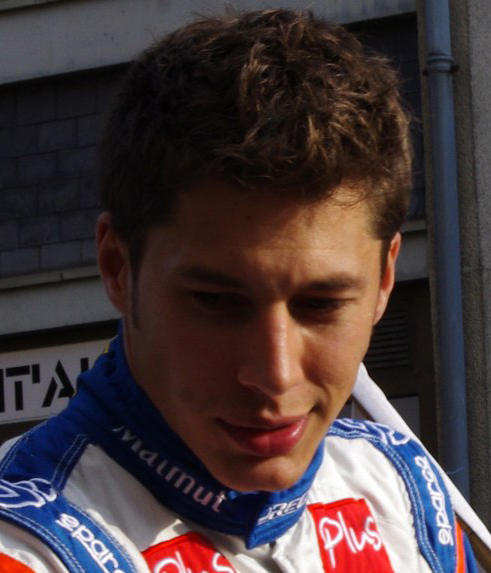
Loïc Duval (pictured in 2011) caused the second practice session to be stopped for ten minutes after crashing his car.

Two practice sessions—both on Sunday morning—were held before the Sunday late afternoon race. The first session ran for 45 minutes and the second for 30 minutes. A 30-minute shakedown was held on Saturday afternoon before the practice sessions and had Ma post the fastest time of 1 minute, 8.633 seconds, four-tenths of a second faster than Nelson Piquet Jr. in second. The session was temporarily halted when Prost's car stopped on track. Both practice sessions took place in warm weather. Di Grassi used 200 kW (270 hp) of power to post the first practice session's fastest lap at 1 minute, 2.381 seconds, 0.145 seconds faster than Buemi in second. Daniel Abt, Engel, Vergne, Bird, Stéphane Sarrazin, Prost, Félix da Costa and Rosenqvist rounded out the session's top ten fastest drivers. The session was first disrupted when Oliver Turvey's vehicle stopped on track with an electrical issue after four minutes, necessitating the brief deployment of red flags, to allow course workers to remove his car from the circuit. A second stoppage occurred when the Andretti of Robin Frijns (who previously spun twice) lost control of his car at turn nine and blocked the track, and Rosenqvist impacted the first turn barrier and was stranded at the corner's run-off area.

In the second practice session, Vergne was quickest with a lap of 1 minute, 2.350 seconds, ahead of Prost, Bird, Rosenqvist, Félix da Costa, Heidfeld, Buemi, Ma, Sarrazin and Loïc Duval (Dragon). Duval lost control of his car and crashed into the turn ten outside barrier's exit, removing both of his right-hand side tyres, and stopping the session for ten minutes to allow his car to be removed from the centre of the track. Engel spun and damaged his right-rear suspension, but was able to drive slowly back to the pit lane. Di Grassi ran wide and went deep onto the turn two run-off area. He spun his car to exit the corner but struck a wall, removing his rear wing. López lost his vehicle's nose cone in a collision with a wall at the same corner, and his rear wing was removed from his car when he hit the turn eight barrier. His rear wing was off the racing line, avoiding the need for yellow flags. The session concluded early when Piquet collided with the chicane exit barrier.

== Qualifying ==
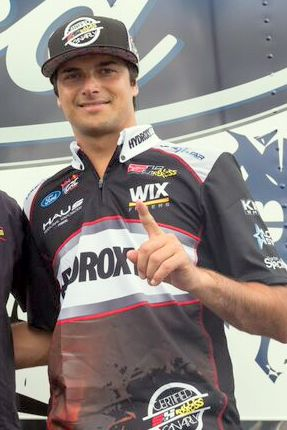
Nelson Piquet Jr. (pictured in 2015) secured his first Formula E career pole position.

After practice but before qualifying, circuit officials elected to remove a kerb at the chicane with the teams notified of the change shortly before qualifying began. Saturday afternoon's qualifying session ran for 60 minutes and was divided into four groups of five cars. Each group was determined by a lottery system and was permitted six minutes of on-track activity. All drivers were limited to two timed laps with one at maximum power. The fastest five overall competitors in the four groups participated in a "Super Pole" session with one driver on the track at any time going out in reverse order from fifth to first. Each of the five drivers was limited to one timed lap and the starting order was determined by the competitor's fastest times (Super Pole from first to fifth, and group qualifying from sixth to twentieth). The driver and team who recorded the fastest time were awarded three points towards their respective championships. Qualifying was held in warm weather. The modifications to the kerb and a dirty track slowed lap times by at least one second than in practice. Super Pole was cancelled following several long delays caused by multiple crashes and the starting order was determined by the fastest overall times in the four groups.

Piquet clinched the first pole position of his career and the first for NextEV with a time of 1 minute, 3.099 seconds. He was joined on the grid's front row by teammate Turvey who was 0.132 seconds slower. In his first Formula E qualifying session, López qualified third in front of his teammate Bird. Buemi went out first in the fourth group and was initially two-tenths of a second slower than Piquet despite no driver errors on his full power lap and took fifth place. Rosenqvist was the first driver to venture onto the track in the group three and drove aggressively which saw him make light contact with the barrier to qualify sixth. Abt took seventh place, ahead of Duval but he served a three-place starting position penalty after he was observed speeding under red-flag conditions in shakedown. Hence, Vergne inherited eighth and his fastest time was set on cold tyres and brakes.

Prost's full power lap saw him narrowly avoid hitting the chicane and his car slid at the final turn, leaving him ninth. Heidfeld took tenth, ad Engel was the fastest driver who was not issued with a penalty to not qualify within the top ten. He was more than one-tenth of a second faster than 13th-placed qualifier Félix da Costa, who in turn, was nearly four-tenths ahead of débutant Carroll. The trio were followed by Sarrazin in 15th, and Evans 16th; cold brakes and tyres slowed Evans. Ma's left-rear quarter was damaged when he made contact with a barrier beside the circuit and qualified 17th. Jérôme d'Ambrosio struggled and began behind Ma. Di Grassi, 19th, pushed hard and made an error at the chicane, hitting the wall, damaging his front-left quarter, and triggering red-flag conditions with three minutes left in the second group. Frijns completed the field and temporarily stopped qualifying when his car went airborne after hitting the kerbs at the chicane and collided with the barrier.

=== Qualifying classification ===
Final qualifying classification
Pos.	No.	Driver	Team	Time	Gap	Grid
1	3	(Brazil) Nelson Piquet Jr.	NextEV NIO	1:03.099	—	1
2	88	(United Kingdom) Oliver Turvey	NextEV NIO	1:03.231	+0.132	2
3	37	(Argentina) José María López	Virgin-Citroën	1:03.251	+0.152	3
4	2	(United Kingdom) Sam Bird	Virgin-Citroën	1:03.258	+0.159	4
5	9	(Switzerland) Sébastien Buemi	e.dams-Renault	1:03.317	+0.218	5
6	19	(Sweden) Felix Rosenqvist	Mahindra	1:03.332	+0.233	6
7	66	(Germany) Daniel Abt	Audi Sport ABT	1:03.615	+0.516	7
8	6	(France) Loïc Duval	Dragon-Penske	1:03.637	+0.538	11^{1}
9	25	(France) Jean-Éric Vergne	Techeetah-Renault	1:03.750	+0.651	8
10	8	(France) Nico Prost	e.dams-Renault	1:03.759	+0.660	9
11	23	(Germany) Nick Heidfeld	Mahindra	1:03.848	+0.749	10
12	5	(Germany) Maro Engel	Venturi	1:03.915	+0.816	12
13	28	(Portugal) António Félix da Costa	Andretti-BMW	1:04.057	+0.958	13
14	47	(United Kingdom) Adam Carroll	Jaguar	1:04.428	+1.329	14
15	4	(France) Stéphane Sarrazin	Venturi	1:04.520	+1.421	15
16	20	(New Zealand) Mitch Evans	Jaguar	1:04.588	+1.489	16
17	33	(China) Ma Qinghua	Techeetah-Renault	1:04.740	+1.641	17
18	7	(Belgium) Jérôme d'Ambrosio	Dragon-Penske	1:05.166	+2.067	18
19	11	(Brazil) Lucas di Grassi	Audi Sport ABT	1:08.094	+4.995	19
20	27	(Netherlands) Robin Frijns	Andretti-BMW	1:10.407	+7.308	20

Notes:

- ^1 — Loïc Duval received a three-place grid penalty for speeding under red flag conditions in the shakedown session.

== Race ==
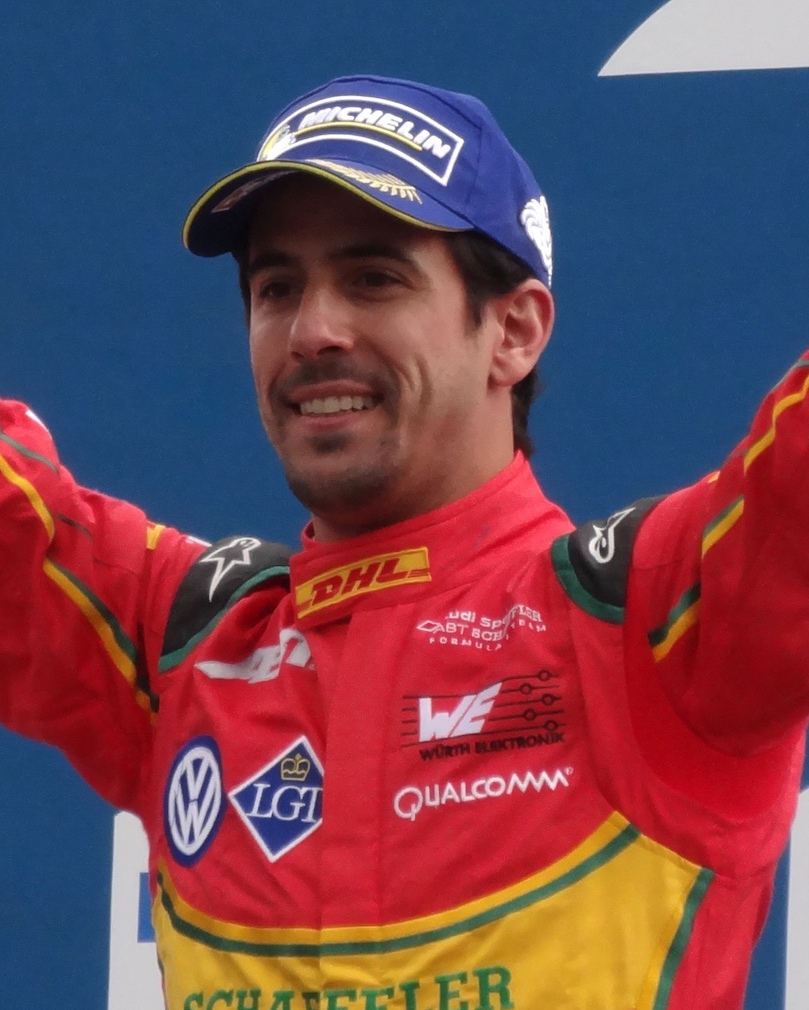
Lucas di Grassi finished second despite damaging his car on the race's first lap.

A special feature of Formula E is the "Fan Boost" feature, an additional 100 kW (130 hp) of power to use in the driver's second car. The three drivers who were allowed to use the boost were determined by a fan vote. For the Hong Kong race, Buemi, di Grassi and López were handed the extra power and the results were announced on the 14th lap. The weather at the start was dry, warm and mostly sunny. The air temperature ranged from 28.0 to 28.8 °C (82.4 to 83.8 °F) with a track temperature between 36.1 to 37.8 °C (97.0 to 100.0 °F). Rain showers from a nearby typhoon had been forecast for the race but moved away from Hong Kong before it started. The event was attended by 30,000 people. When the event started at 16:00 Hong Kong Time (UTC+8), Piquet and his teammate Turvey made clean getaways and maintained first and second on the straight heading into the first turn. López ran wide leaving the first corner, made minor contact with the turn's barrier, allowing teammate Bird and Buemi to overtake him. López lightly hit Bird and fell down the running order because of heavy steering damage. Under braking for the second turn, Abt's rear wing was removed when Félix da Costa collided with him, causing Ma to apply his brakes and strike the back of Félix da Costa's car, leading to the removal of the former's front wing. Di Grassi was unable to slow and collided with Ma's rear, removing the front-right section of his nose cone.

Prost fell from ninth of 14th by the end of the first lap because of an incorrect power setting, while Heidfeld made four positions over the same distance. At the end of the first lap Piquet led from teammate Turvey, who was followed in turn, by Bird, Buemi, López, Heidfeld, Rosenqvist, Duval, Vergne and Abt. Piquet pulled away from the rest of the field as Buemi started to draw closer to Bird and Turvey. López fell to eighth on the second lap after Mahindra's Heidfeld and Rosenqvist along with Duval overtook him. Both di Grassi and Abt were shown a black flag with an orange circle, requiring both drivers to make pit stops for car repair. Ma switched to a second car but became the race's first retirement soon after because of a battery issue. Bird placed Turvey under pressure which allowed Piquet to open up a two-second lead by lap four. On lap five, Di Grassi moved to the outside line into the chicane on the fifth lap and overtook Sarrazin and López leaving the turn and moved in front of Carroll into the second corner. Bird overtook Turvey for second position on lap six, and Buemi passed Turvey by turning left into turn one on the following lap.

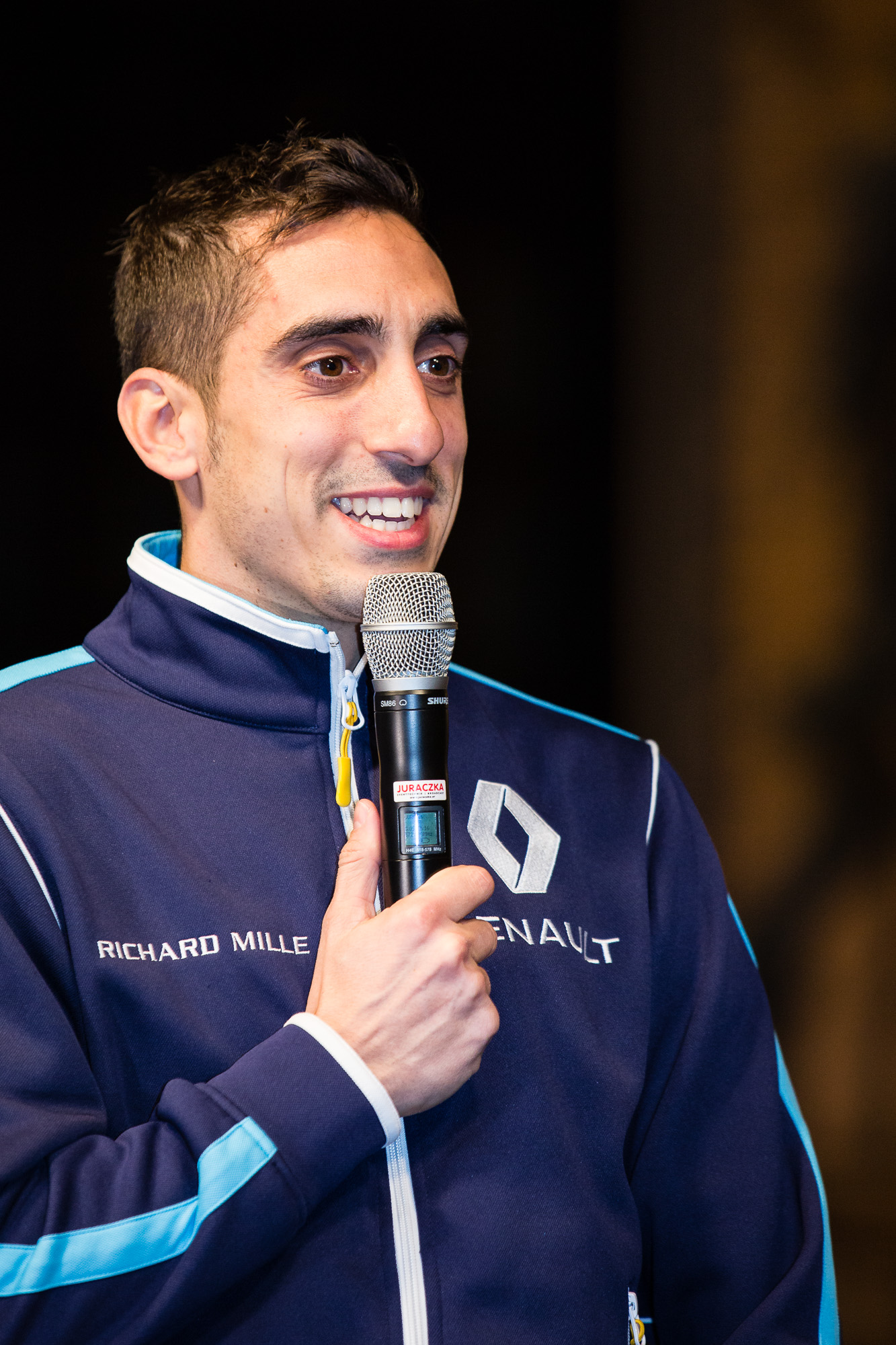
Sébastien Buemi clinched his first victory of the season.

Di Grassi made his required pit stop for a new front wing on lap eighth and narrowly avoided striking a trackside marshal leaving his pit stall. Vergne dropped down the order when his car developed a water pump battery failure and had to make an unscheduled pit stop to move into his second vehicle on lap nine. López had dropped to 16th place by the start of the next lap. Bird briefly reduced the time deficit to Piquet until the latter responded to his fast pace. Rosenqvist lost control of the rear of his car and slid backwards into the turn five barrier on the 14th lap, damaging his rear wing. The crash forced him to make a pit stop to switch into his second car. López carried a large amount of speed exiting the chicane and made contact with a wall on lap 17. Piquet was close behind and took avoiding action but reacted late and had an understeer that sent him into a barrier. He did not damage his car and extricated himself from the barrier but lost the lead to Bird and Buemi moved to second. The incident necessitated the safety car's deployment to allow marshals to repair the wall and remove López's car from the track. Some drivers, including Buemi, made their mandatory pit stops to switch into their second cars under safety car conditions at the end of the 20th lap.

Bird elected not to make a pit stop and maintained the lead at the lap-22 restart, ahead of Félix da Costa. Piquet chose to make his pit stop immediately after racing resumed. Bird pulled away from Félix da Costa whom the delayed Vergne slowed. He chose to remain on the circuit with a strategy to conserve electrical energy which was followed by both Jaguar drivers. Bird made his pit stop at the end of the 25th lap and it appeared that he would rejoin the race in the top ten but technical problems with his second car caused him to search for different reset procedures, losing 1 minute, 27 seconds and emerged one lap down in 15th position. An electrical issue was discovered on Evans' second car during his pit stop and his team elected to retire him on the same lap to prevent further damage. Frijns led the field for one lap before making his pit stop on the 26th lap. Buemi took the lead from Frijns with di Grassi second and Heidfeld third. Di Grassi closed to within less than two seconds of Buemi with ten laps left with the latter reacting by extending his advantage to 2 1/2 seconds. Rosenqvist set the race's fastest lap of 1 minute, 2.947 on lap 36, earning him one point.

By the 38th lap, drivers who made their stops under safety car conditions entered their electrical energy conservation phase. Andretti chose to allow their drivers to remain on the circuit for as long as possible, allowing Félix da Costa and Frijns to catch and overtake d'Ambrosio and Turvey for fifth and sixth in the closing laps. Félix da Costa then attempted to catch the fourth-placed Prost but was unable to get close to him. As the final lap began, di Grassi, Heidfeld and Prost had five per cent of usage electrical energy remaining. Buemi was unchallenged for the rest of the lap to take his first victory of the season and the seventh of his career. Di Grassi finished second, ahead of Heidfeld in third. Prost, Félix da Costa, Frijns, d'Ambrosio, Turvey, Engel and Sarrazin rounded out the top ten. Piquet, Carroll filled the next two positions. Bird was fast enough to unlap himself by passing the race leaders, despite spinning his tyres at the circuit's low-speed exit turns, and finished 13th. Duval and Rosenqvist were the final finishers. There were three lead changes in the race; four drivers reached the front of the field. Buemi led once for a total of 20 laps, more than any other competitor. Of the two other retirees, Vergne stopped with an overheating battery, and Abt lost all electrical energy in his car after 34 laps.

=== Post-race ===
The top three drivers appeared on the podium to collect their trophies and spoke to the media in a later press conference. Buemi said that the race had not been easy because his battery had greatly overheated and another lap would have prevented him from finishing. Nevertheless, he was happy to begin the new season with a victory after having ended the previous season badly. He later confessed that luck played a role in him winning as his car was not set-up to his preference but reserved praise to his strategist. Second-place finisher di Grassi spoke of his delight with the result and that his race had been "crazy" which demonstrated that this team they did not stop and it was "a great start" to his season. He praised his mechanics for helping him stay on the same lap as the leaders and believed that he was targeting the fastest lap award. Heidfeld, who finished in third, stated that he was happy to achieve a podium position in the first race of the season and hoped that his team could finish their forward progress in the championship.

Piquet said it was a mixed day for his team considering that he had the pole position and made a quick getaway at the start but was disappointed to finish 11th. He claimed that the incident with López may have happened to any other driver but was looking forward to the season's next race where he hoped to qualify well and his team were going to keep pushing. Bird was disappointed with the result, saying it was beneficial if the technical problems with his second car at the pit stop were diagnosed in the season's first race rather than later on. His teammate López thanked the sport's fans for voting him to receive the FanBoost and was upbeat despite retiring from his first event: "The car is fast and I think qualifying proved that. I’m sure the end result will be much, much better in Marrakech." Vergne told the press that he lost the chance to achieve a strong result in the race when his car developed problems with his car's water pump and described the event as "a big mess" but felt certain that he could secure the championship.

As this was the first race of the season, Buemi led the Drivers' Championship with 25 points, seven ahead of di Grassi in second, who in turn, was a further three in front of the third-placed Heidfeld. Prost was fourth on 12 points, and Félix da Costa was fifth with ten points. e.Dams-Renault's first and fourth-place finishes meant they became the leaders of the Teams' Championship with 37 points; Audi Sport ABT and Andretti were tied for second with 18 points each. Mahindra stood in fourth on 16 points, nine ahead of NextEV in fifth place with eleven races left in the season. Despite negative press reviews about the Hong Kong ePrix, Agag reaffirmed his commitment to holding a race in the city and stated that he would not be discouraged by any financial losses incurred from the event.

=== Race classification ===
Drivers who scored championship points are denoted in bold.

Final race classification
Pos.	No.	Driver	Team	Laps	Time/Retired	Grid	Points
1	**9**	**(Switzerland) Sébastien Buemi**	**e.dams-Renault**	**45**	**53:13.298**	**5**	**25**
2	**11**	**(Brazil) Lucas di Grassi**	**Audi Sport ABT**	**45**	**+2.477**	**19**	**18**
3	**23**	**(Germany) Nick Heidfeld**	**Mahindra**	**45**	**+5.522**	**10**	**15**
4	**8**	**(France) Nico Prost**	**e.dams-Renault**	**45**	**+7.360**	**9**	**12**
5	**28**	**(Portugal) António Félix da Costa**	**Andretti-BMW**	**45**	**+17.987**	**13**	**10**
6	**27**	**(Netherlands) Robin Frijns**	**Andretti-BMW**	**45**	**+21.161**	**20**	**8**
7	**7**	**(Belgium) Jérôme d'Ambrosio**	**Dragon-Penske**	**45**	**+28.443**	**18**	**6**
8	**88**	**(United Kingdom) Oliver Turvey**	**NextEV NIO**	**45**	**+30.355**	**2**	**4**
9	**5**	**(Germany) Maro Engel**	**Venturi**	**45**	**+30.898**	**12**	**2**
10	**4**	**(France) Stéphane Sarrazin**	**Venturi**	**45**	**+31.734**	**15**	**1**
11	3	(Brazil) Nelson Piquet Jr.	NextEV NIO	45	+35.256	1	3^{1}
12	47	(United Kingdom) Adam Carroll	Jaguar	45	+43.839	14	
13	2	(United Kingdom) Sam Bird	Virgin-Citroën	45	+48.058	4	
14	6	(France) Loïc Duval	Dragon-Penske	43	+2 Laps	11	
15	**19**	**(Sweden) Felix Rosenqvist**	**Mahindra**	**43**	**+2 Laps**	**6**	**1^{2}**
Ret	66	(Germany) Daniel Abt	Audi Sport ABT	34	Battery	7	
Ret	25	(France) Jean-Éric Vergne	Techeetah-Renault	31	Battery	8	
Ret	20	(New Zealand) Mitch Evans	Jaguar	24	Electrical	16	
Ret	37	(Argentina) José María López	Virgin-Citroën	15	Accident	3	
Ret	33	(China) Ma Qinghua	Techeetah-Renault	1	Collision damage	17	

Notes:

- **^1** — Three points for pole position.
- **^2** — One point for fastest lap.

== Standings after the race ==
Drivers' Championship standings

Pos	Driver	Points
1	(Switzerland) Sébastien Buemi	25
2	(Brazil) Lucas di Grassi	18 (−7)
3	(Germany) Nick Heidfeld	15 (−10)
4	(France) Nico Prost	12 (−13)
5	(Portugal) António Félix da Costa	10 (−15)

Teams' Championship standings

Pos	Constructor	Points
1	(France) e.Dams-Renault	37
2	(Germany) Audi Sport ABT	18 (−19)
3	(United States) Andretti-BMW	18 (−19)
4	(India) Mahindra	16 (−21)
5	(China) NextEV NIO	7 (−30)

- Notes: Only the top five positions are included for both sets of standings.

Previous race: 2016 London ePrix	FIA Formula E Championship; 2016–17 season	Next race: 2016 Marrakesh ePrix
Previous race: N/A	Hong Kong ePrix	Next race: 2017 Hong Kong ePrix
