= Formula E Race at Home Challenge =

Short lived virtual race series

ABB Formula E Race at Home Challenge
- 2020

Tournament information
- Sport: Formula E
- Dates: 18 April 2020–7 June 2020
- Administrator: Formula E
- Tournament formats: Classes: Driver Grid; Challenge Grid; Pre-qualifying: Challenge Grid only; Monday–Thursday before the event; 18 drivers can pre-qualify for the event; Guest drivers complete the grid; The top 24 players in the standings will be invited to the Grand Final; Qualifying: One-shot qualifying in groups; Race: Damage level set at 80%; Elimination "Race Royale"; The final twelve then sprints to the finish (Note: Originally it was the final ten.)
- Host: rFactor 2

Final positions
- Champions: Driver Grid: (Belgium) Stoffel Vandoorne; Challenge Grid: (Slovenia) Kevin Siggy

The Formula E Race at Home Challenge (formally the ABB Formula E Race at Home Challenge in support of UNICEF) was a series of esports events held as a temporary replacement of the suspended 2019–20 Formula E season due to the COVID-19 pandemic. The series was run on the platform of rFactor 2. The virtual tournament was broadcast on various Formula E social channels along with selected television partners.

British racing driver Charlie Martin was announced as the first guest participant in the Race at Home Challenge, and will occupy a permanent guest role for the entirety of the series. As such, she became the first transgender driver to be affiliated with FIA Formula E and joined a host of other female drivers who had either competed in the series or who had participated in test events.

Daniel Abt had all his points taken away after the Berlin race as he was found to have used professional gamer, Lorenz Hörzing in his place. Abt additionally paid £8,900 (10,000 Euros) to charity. Hörzing was banned from the Challenge grid outright. Abt was later suspended and released by Audi.

== Teams and drivers ==
| Team | No. | Driver Grid | | Challenge Grid (Note: Drivers who failed to pre-qualify for any given round are not listed here. Those who already made it into the championship, but failed to pre-qualify for any given round, are only listed in the Challenge Grid standings as "did not pre-qualify" (DNPQ). This only includes those drivers who actually entered the pre-qualifying stage of that round. Drivers who did pre-qualify for any given round, but did not enter it, are only listed in the Challenge Grid standings as "did not participate" (DNP) and also in the Replacements subsection.) | |
| Team | No. | Drivers | Rounds | Drivers | Rounds |
|---|---|---|---|---|---|
| (United Kingdom) Envision Virgin Racing | 2 | (New Zealand) Nick Cassidy | 0–1 | (United Kingdom) Jimmy Broadbent | 0 |
| (United Kingdom) Envision Virgin Racing | 2 | (New Zealand) Nick Cassidy | 0–1 | (Austria) Lorenz Hörzing | 1 |
| (United Kingdom) Envision Virgin Racing | 2 | (United Kingdom) Sam Bird | 2–8 | (Germany) Joel Schmitt | 2 |
| (United Kingdom) Envision Virgin Racing | 2 | (United Kingdom) Sam Bird | 2–8 | (Italy) Matteo Topa | 3 |
| (United Kingdom) Envision Virgin Racing | 2 | (United Kingdom) Sam Bird | 2–8 | (Austria) Lorenz Hörzing | 4–5 |
| (United Kingdom) Envision Virgin Racing | 2 | (United Kingdom) Sam Bird | 2–8 | (Turkey) Özgür Benzes | 6–7 |
| (United Kingdom) Envision Virgin Racing | 4 | (Netherlands) Robin Frijns | 0–7 | (United Kingdom) Graham Carroll | 0 |
| (United Kingdom) Envision Virgin Racing | 4 | (Netherlands) Robin Frijns | 0–7 | (Germany) Ben Hitz | 1–7 |
| (United Kingdom) Envision Virgin Racing | 4 | (United Kingdom) Alice Powell | 8 | (Germany) Ben Hitz | 8 |
| (China) NIO 333 FE Team | 3 | (United Kingdom) Oliver Turvey | All | (China) Liu Zexuan | 0, 4 |
| (China) NIO 333 FE Team | 3 | (United Kingdom) Oliver Turvey | All | (Croatia) Petar Brljak | 1–3 |
| (China) NIO 333 FE Team | 3 | (United Kingdom) Oliver Turvey | All | (United Kingdom) Charlie Martin | 5–7 |
| (China) NIO 333 FE Team | 3 | (United Kingdom) Oliver Turvey | All | (Greece) Jim Parisis | 8 |
| (China) NIO 333 FE Team | 33 | (China) Ma Qinghua | All | (Croatia) Petar Brljak | 0 |
| (China) NIO 333 FE Team | 33 | (China) Ma Qinghua | All | (Greece) Jim Parisis | 1–2, 4–5 |
| (China) NIO 333 FE Team | 33 | (China) Ma Qinghua | All | (China) Ye Yifei | 3, 6–7 |
| (Germany) Mercedes-Benz EQ Formula E Team | 5 | (Belgium) Stoffel Vandoorne | All | (United Kingdom) Archie Hamilton | 0–1 |
| (Germany) Mercedes-Benz EQ Formula E Team | 5 | (Belgium) Stoffel Vandoorne | All | (United Kingdom) Mike Channell | 2 |
| (Germany) Mercedes-Benz EQ Formula E Team | 5 | (Belgium) Stoffel Vandoorne | All | (Germany) Sophia Flörsch | 3–4, 7 |
| (Germany) Mercedes-Benz EQ Formula E Team | 5 | (Belgium) Stoffel Vandoorne | All | (United Kingdom) Axel LaFlamme | 5–6 |
| (Germany) Mercedes-Benz EQ Formula E Team | 17 | (Netherlands) Nyck de Vries | All | (Spain) Daniel Juncadella | 0 |
| (Germany) Mercedes-Benz EQ Formula E Team | 17 | (Netherlands) Nyck de Vries | All | (Netherlands) Noah Reuvers | 1–8 |
| (United States) GEOX Dragon | 6 | (New Zealand) Brendon Hartley | All | (Sweden) Joel Eriksson | 0–1, 4 |
| (United States) GEOX Dragon | 6 | (New Zealand) Brendon Hartley | All | (United Kingdom) Alex Cooper | 2 |
| (United States) GEOX Dragon | 6 | (New Zealand) Brendon Hartley | All | (France) Kevin Morville | 3 |
| (United States) GEOX Dragon | 6 | (New Zealand) Brendon Hartley | All | (United Kingdom) Chris Shepherd | 5 |
| (United States) GEOX Dragon | 6 | (New Zealand) Brendon Hartley | All | (Italy) Armando Iannaccone | 6 |
| (United States) GEOX Dragon | 6 | (New Zealand) Brendon Hartley | All | (United Kingdom) Axel LaFlamme | 7 |
| (United States) GEOX Dragon | 7 | (Switzerland) Nico Müller | 0–7 | (United Kingdom) Brandon Williams | 0 |
| (United States) GEOX Dragon | 7 | (Switzerland) Nico Müller | 0–7 | (Bulgaria) Peyo Peev | 1–7 |
| (United States) GEOX Dragon | 7 | (Sweden) Joel Eriksson | 8 | (Bulgaria) Peyo Peev | 8 |
| (Germany) Audi Sport ABT Schaeffler | 11 | (Brazil) Lucas di Grassi | All | (United Kingdom) Steve Alvarez Brown | 0 |
| (Germany) Audi Sport ABT Schaeffler | 11 | (Brazil) Lucas di Grassi | All | (Czech Republic) Jiří Toman | 1 |
| (Germany) Audi Sport ABT Schaeffler | 11 | (Brazil) Lucas di Grassi | All | (South Africa) Kelvin van der Linde | 2 |
| (Germany) Audi Sport ABT Schaeffler | 11 | (Brazil) Lucas di Grassi | All | (Sweden) Eric Stranne | 3 |
| (Germany) Audi Sport ABT Schaeffler | 11 | (Brazil) Lucas di Grassi | All | (Norway) Scott Søvik | 4 |
| (Germany) Audi Sport ABT Schaeffler | 11 | (Brazil) Lucas di Grassi | All | (United Kingdom) Lionel O'Connor | 5 |
| (Germany) Audi Sport ABT Schaeffler | 11 | (Brazil) Lucas di Grassi | All | (United States) Verena Mei | 6 |
| (Germany) Audi Sport ABT Schaeffler | 11 | (Brazil) Lucas di Grassi | All | (Germany) Moritz Löhner | 7 |
| (Germany) Audi Sport ABT Schaeffler | 11 | (Brazil) Lucas di Grassi | All | (Netherlands) Arjan Veltens | 8 |
| (Germany) Audi Sport ABT Schaeffler | 31 | (South Africa) Kelvin van der Linde | 7–8 | (United Kingdom) Alisdair Irvine | 7–8 |
| (Germany) Audi Sport ABT Schaeffler | 66 | (Germany) Daniel Abt | 0–5 | (Poland) Zbigniew Siara | 1 |
| (Germany) Audi Sport ABT Schaeffler | 66 | (Germany) Daniel Abt | 0–5 | (United Kingdom) Axel LaFlamme | 2–4 (Note: For Round 4, LaFlamme was registered to drive for the Venturi Racing car no. 48, but instead drove the Audi car no. 66, which was officially assigned to Alisdair Irvine, meaning that Audi had three drivers that day.) |
| (Germany) Audi Sport ABT Schaeffler | 66 | (Germany) Daniel Abt | 0–5 | (United Kingdom) Alisdair Irvine | 4–6 |
| (China) DS Techeetah | 13 | (Portugal) António Félix da Costa | All | (United Kingdom) Charlie Martin | 0, 4 |
| (China) DS Techeetah | 13 | (Portugal) António Félix da Costa | All | (United Kingdom) James Rossiter | 1 |
| (China) DS Techeetah | 13 | (Portugal) António Félix da Costa | All | (United Kingdom) Chris Shepherd | 2 |
| (China) DS Techeetah | 13 | (Portugal) António Félix da Costa | All | (Norway) Scott Søvik | 3 |
| (China) DS Techeetah | 13 | (Portugal) António Félix da Costa | All | (India) Kush Maini | 5–8 |
| (China) DS Techeetah | 25 | (France) Jean-Éric Vergne | All | (United Kingdom) James Rossiter | 0 |
| (China) DS Techeetah | 25 | (France) Jean-Éric Vergne | All | (Portugal) Nuno Pinto | 1–7 |
| (Germany) TAG Heuer Porsche Formula E Team | 18 | (Switzerland) Neel Jani | All | (Germany) Moritz Löhner | 0 |
| (Germany) TAG Heuer Porsche Formula E Team | 18 | (Switzerland) Neel Jani | All | (United Kingdom) Mike Channell | 1 |
| (Germany) TAG Heuer Porsche Formula E Team | 18 | (Switzerland) Neel Jani | All | (Poland) Nikodem Wisniewski | 2 |
| (Germany) TAG Heuer Porsche Formula E Team | 18 | (Switzerland) Neel Jani | All | (United Kingdom) Alisdair Irvine | 3 |
| (Germany) TAG Heuer Porsche Formula E Team | 18 | (Switzerland) Neel Jani | All | (Germany) Marius Golombeck | 4–5 |
| (Germany) TAG Heuer Porsche Formula E Team | 18 | (Switzerland) Neel Jani | All | (Australia) Joshua Rogers | 6–8 |
| (Germany) TAG Heuer Porsche Formula E Team | 36 | (Germany) André Lotterer | All | (United Kingdom) Mike Channell | 0 |
| (Germany) TAG Heuer Porsche Formula E Team | 36 | (Germany) André Lotterer | All | (Australia) Joshua Rogers | 1, 4 |
| (Germany) TAG Heuer Porsche Formula E Team | 36 | (Germany) André Lotterer | All | (Switzerland) Simona de Silvestro | 2–3 |
| (Germany) TAG Heuer Porsche Formula E Team | 36 | (Germany) André Lotterer | All | (Netherlands) Arjan Veltens | 5–6 |
| (Germany) TAG Heuer Porsche Formula E Team | 36 | (Germany) André Lotterer | All | (Germany) Marius Golombeck | 7–8 |
| (Monaco) ROKiT Venturi Racing | 19 | (Brazil) Felipe Massa | All | (North Macedonia) Erhan Jajovski | 0, 2 |
| (Monaco) ROKiT Venturi Racing | 19 | (Brazil) Felipe Massa | All | (United Kingdom) Axel LaFlamme | 1 |
| (Monaco) ROKiT Venturi Racing | 19 | (Brazil) Felipe Massa | All | (United Kingdom) Jacob Reid | 3–8 |
| (Monaco) ROKiT Venturi Racing | 48 | (Switzerland) Edoardo Mortara | All | (North Macedonia) Erhan Jajovski | 1 |
| (Monaco) ROKiT Venturi Racing | 48 | (Switzerland) Edoardo Mortara | All | (United Kingdom) Jacob Reid | 2 |
| (Monaco) ROKiT Venturi Racing | 48 | (Switzerland) Edoardo Mortara | All | (United Kingdom) Gareth Paterson | 3–4 (Note: For Round 4, Paterson was registered to drive for the BMW i Andretti car no. 27, but instead drove the Venturi car no. 48, which was officially assigned to Alex LaFlamme, who instead ran in an Audi car no. 66.) |
| (Monaco) ROKiT Venturi Racing | 48 | (Switzerland) Edoardo Mortara | All | (Norway) Scott Søvik | 5–7 |
| (United Kingdom) Panasonic Jaguar Racing | 20 | (New Zealand) Mitch Evans | All | (United Kingdom) Jack Ashton | 0 |
| (United Kingdom) Panasonic Jaguar Racing | 20 | (New Zealand) Mitch Evans | All | (Poland) Kuba Brzezinski | 1–2 |
| (United Kingdom) Panasonic Jaguar Racing | 20 | (New Zealand) Mitch Evans | All | (Netherlands) Remco Majoor | 3 |
| (United Kingdom) Panasonic Jaguar Racing | 20 | (New Zealand) Mitch Evans | All | (Croatia) Petar Brljak | 4 |
| (United Kingdom) Panasonic Jaguar Racing | 20 | (New Zealand) Mitch Evans | All | (United Kingdom) Archie Hamilton | 5 |
| (United Kingdom) Panasonic Jaguar Racing | 20 | (New Zealand) Mitch Evans | All | (United Kingdom) Mike Channell | 6 |
| (United Kingdom) Panasonic Jaguar Racing | 20 | (New Zealand) Mitch Evans | All | (Brazil) Sérgio Jimenez | 7 |
| (United Kingdom) Panasonic Jaguar Racing | 51 | (United Kingdom) James Calado | All | (United Kingdom) Kai Bachini | 0 |
| (United Kingdom) Panasonic Jaguar Racing | 51 | (United Kingdom) James Calado | All | (United Kingdom) Jacob Reid | 1 |
| (United Kingdom) Panasonic Jaguar Racing | 51 | (United Kingdom) James Calado | All | (United Kingdom) Alex Lynn | 2–3 |
| (United Kingdom) Panasonic Jaguar Racing | 51 | (United Kingdom) James Calado | All | (Netherlands) Remco Majoor | 4 |
| (United Kingdom) Panasonic Jaguar Racing | 51 | (United Kingdom) James Calado | All | (Croatia) Petar Brljak | 5–8 |
| (France) Nissan e.dams | 22 | (United Kingdom) Oliver Rowland | All | (Mexico) Ricardo Sanchez | 0 |
| (France) Nissan e.dams | 22 | (United Kingdom) Oliver Rowland | All | (Germany) Marc Gassner | 1 |
| (France) Nissan e.dams | 22 | (United Kingdom) Oliver Rowland | All | (Netherlands) Niek Jacobs | 2–8 |
| (France) Nissan e.dams | 23 | (United Kingdom) Jann Mardenborough | 0 | (Germany) Marc Gassner | 0 |
| (France) Nissan e.dams | 23 | (Switzerland) Sébastien Buemi | 1–8 | (Germany) Jan von der Heyde | 1–6, 8 |
| (France) Nissan e.dams | 23 | (Switzerland) Sébastien Buemi | 1–8 | (Netherlands) Arjan Veltens | 7 |
| (United States) BMW i Andretti Motorsport | 27 | (United Kingdom) Alexander Sims | All | (Norway) Jarl Teien | 0 |
| (United States) BMW i Andretti Motorsport | 27 | (United Kingdom) Alexander Sims | All | (United Kingdom) Charlie Martin | 1–3 |
| (United States) BMW i Andretti Motorsport | 27 | (United Kingdom) Alexander Sims | All | —N/a | 4 |
| (United States) BMW i Andretti Motorsport | 27 | (United Kingdom) Alexander Sims | All | (Turkey) Cem Bölükbaşı | 5–7 |
| (United States) BMW i Andretti Motorsport | 27 | (United Kingdom) Alexander Sims | All | (Turkey) Cem Bölükbaşı | 8 |
| (United States) BMW i Andretti Motorsport | 28 | (Germany) Maximilian Günther | All | (Slovenia) Kevin Siggy | All |
| (India) Mahindra Racing | 64 | (Belgium) Jérôme d'Ambrosio | 0–7 | (Finland) Olli Pahkala | 0–1 |
| (India) Mahindra Racing | 64 | (Belgium) Jérôme d'Ambrosio | 0–7 | (Switzerland) Markus Keller | 2–7 |
| (India) Mahindra Racing | 64 | (Belgium) Sam Dejonghe | 8 | (Switzerland) Markus Keller | 8 |
| (India) Mahindra Racing | 94 | (Belgium) Sam Dejonghe | 0 | (Netherlands) Hany Alsabti | 0 |
| (India) Mahindra Racing | 94 | (Germany) Pascal Wehrlein | 1–8 | (Germany) Lucas Müller | 1–8 |

Guest drivers are marked in green. (Note: Guest drivers had been invited to the championship without the need to pre-qualify for the rounds they entered.)

=== Replacements ===
| Round | Driver | Pre-qualifying method | Replaced by | Reason |
|---|---|---|---|---|
| 2 | (Australia) Joshua Rogers | Finished 1st in previous race | (Netherlands) Noah Reuvers | Finished 9th in pre-qualifying |
| 2 | (Finland) Olli Pahkala | Finished 4th in previous race | (United Kingdom) Alex Cooper | Finished 10th in pre-qualifying |
| 2 | (Italy) Marco Santoni | Finished 7th in pre-qualifying | (Switzerland) Markus Keller | Finished 12th in pre-qualifying |
| 3 | (Greece) Stavros Mouzaidis | Finished 6th in pre-qualifying | (Italy) Matteo Topa | Finished 11th in pre-qualifying |
| 4 | (United Kingdom) Graham Carroll | Finished 2nd in pre-qualifying | (United Kingdom) Alisdair Irvine | Finished 9th in pre-qualifying |
| 4 | (United Kingdom) Chris Shepherd | Finished 8th in pre-qualifying | (Norway) Scott Søvik | Finished 10th in pre-qualifying |
| 5 | N/A | reserved spot for guest driver | (United Kingdom) Alisdair Irvine | Finished 9th in pre-qualifying |
| 5 | (United States) Jack Harrison | Finished 7th in pre-qualifying | (Norway) Scott Søvik | Finished 10th in pre-qualifying |
| 6 | N/A | extra pre-qualifying spot (Note: The top 10 from previous race included a guest driver (Cem Bölükbaşı), who was not eligible to pre-qualify this way as guest drivers are invited separately, meaning that only nine drivers pre-qualified via the previous race result. In previous cases, both James Rossiter and Alex Lynn did not free up an extra spot despite finishing in the top 10 in their respective races, suggesting a possible rule change has been made since.) | (Italy) Armando Iannaccone | Finished 9th in pre-qualifying |
| 6 | (United Kingdom) Graham Carroll | Finished 1st in pre-qualifying | (Turkey) Özgür Benzes | Finished 10th in pre-qualifying |
| 7 | (Germany) Jan von der Heyde | Finished 2nd in previous race | (Turkey) Özgür Benzes | Finished 9th in pre-qualifying |

== Calendar ==
| Round | Circuit | Date |
|---|---|---|
| 0 | Circuit de Monaco | April 18 |
| 1 | Hong Kong Central Harbourfront Circuit | April 25 |
| 2 | (United States) Lester Special – Electric Docks | May 2 |
| 3 | Circuit de Monaco | May 9 |
| 4 | Hong Kong Central Harbourfront Circuit | May 16 |
| 5 | (Germany) Tempelhof Airport Street Circuit | May 23 |
| 6 | (United States) Brooklyn Street Circuit | May 30 |
| 7 | (United States) Brooklyn Street Circuit | June 6 |
| 8 | (Germany) Tempelhof Airport Street Circuit | June 7 |

Fictional tracks are marked in light cyan.

== Results and standings ==
| Round | Race | Pole position | Fastest lap | Winning driver | Winning team | Class |
|---|---|---|---|---|---|---|
| 0 | Circuit de Monaco | (Germany) Maximilian Günther | (Belgium) Stoffel Vandoorne | (Germany) Maximilian Günther | (United States) BMW i Andretti Motorsport | Driver Grid |
| 0 | Circuit de Monaco | (United Kingdom) Graham Carroll | (Finland) Olli Pahkala | (United Kingdom) Graham Carroll | (United Kingdom) Envision Virgin Racing | Challenge Grid |
| 1 | Hong Kong Central Harbourfront Circuit | (Belgium) Stoffel Vandoorne | (New Zealand) Nick Cassidy | (Germany) Maximilian Günther | (United States) BMW i Andretti Motorsport | Driver Grid |
| 1 | Hong Kong Central Harbourfront Circuit | (Croatia) Petar Brljak | (Slovenia) Kevin Siggy | (Australia) Joshua Rogers | (Germany) TAG Heuer Porsche Formula E Team | Challenge Grid |
| 2 | (United States) Lester Special – Electric Docks | (Belgium) Stoffel Vandoorne | (Germany) Pascal Wehrlein | (Germany) Maximilian Günther | (United States) BMW i Andretti Motorsport | Driver Grid |
| 2 | (United States) Lester Special – Electric Docks | (Bulgaria) Peyo Peev | (Bulgaria) Peyo Peev | (Bulgaria) Peyo Peev | (United States) GEOX Dragon | Challenge Grid |
| 3 | Circuit de Monaco | (Germany) Pascal Wehrlein | (Germany) Pascal Wehrlein | (Germany) Pascal Wehrlein | (India) Mahindra Racing | Driver Grid |
| 3 | Circuit de Monaco | (Slovenia) Kevin Siggy | (Slovenia) Kevin Siggy | (Slovenia) Kevin Siggy | (United States) BMW i Andretti Motorsport | Challenge Grid |
| 4 | Hong Kong Central Harbourfront Circuit | (Switzerland) Edoardo Mortara | (Germany) Pascal Wehrlein | (Germany) Pascal Wehrlein | (India) Mahindra Racing | Driver Grid |
| 4 | Hong Kong Central Harbourfront Circuit | (Australia) Joshua Rogers | (Australia) Joshua Rogers | (Germany) Lucas Müller | (India) Mahindra Racing | Challenge Grid |
| 5 | (Germany) Tempelhof Airport Street Circuit | (Belgium) Stoffel Vandoorne | (Belgium) Stoffel Vandoorne | (United Kingdom) Oliver Rowland | (France) Nissan e.dams | Driver Grid |
| 5 | (Germany) Tempelhof Airport Street Circuit | (Slovenia) Kevin Siggy | (Croatia) Petar Brljak | (Slovenia) Kevin Siggy | (United States) BMW i Andretti Motorsport | Challenge Grid |
| 6 | (United States) Brooklyn Street Circuit | (Belgium) Stoffel Vandoorne | (Belgium) Stoffel Vandoorne | (Belgium) Stoffel Vandoorne | (Germany) Mercedes-Benz EQ Formula E Team | Driver Grid |
| 6 | (United States) Brooklyn Street Circuit | (Slovenia) Kevin Siggy | (Slovenia) Kevin Siggy | (Slovenia) Kevin Siggy | (United States) BMW i Andretti Motorsport | Challenge Grid |
| 7 | (United States) Brooklyn Street Circuit | (Germany) Pascal Wehrlein | (Belgium) Stoffel Vandoorne | (Germany) Pascal Wehrlein | (India) Mahindra Racing | Driver Grid |
| 7 | (United States) Brooklyn Street Circuit | (Germany) Lucas Müller | (Slovenia) Kevin Siggy | (Germany) Lucas Müller | (India) Mahindra Racing | Challenge Grid |
| 8 | (Germany) Tempelhof Airport Street Circuit | (United Kingdom) Oliver Rowland | (Belgium) Stoffel Vandoorne | (United Kingdom) Oliver Rowland | (France) Nissan e.dams | Driver Grid |
| 8 | (Germany) Tempelhof Airport Street Circuit | (Slovenia) Kevin Siggy | (Slovenia) Kevin Siggy | (Slovenia) Kevin Siggy | (United States) BMW i Andretti Motorsport | Challenge Grid |

=== Points structure ===
| Round | 1st | 2nd | 3rd | 4th | 5th | 6th | 7th | 8th | 9th | 10th | Pole | FL |
|---|---|---|---|---|---|---|---|---|---|---|---|---|
| 0 | No points awarded | | | | | | | | | | | |
| 1–7 | 25 | 18 | 15 | 12 | 10 | 8 | 6 | 4 | 2 | 1 | 1 | 1 |
| 8 | 50 | 36 | 30 | 24 | 20 | 16 | 12 | 8 | 4 | 2 | 2 | 2 |

=== Driver Grid standings ===
| Pos. | Driver | MCO (Monaco) | HKG (Hong Kong) | LES (United States) | MCO (Monaco) | HKG (Hong Kong) | BER (Germany) | NYC (United States) | NYC (United States) | BER (Germany) | Pts |
|---|---|---|---|---|---|---|---|---|---|---|---|
| 1 | (Germany) Maximilian Günther | **1** | 1 | 1 | 3 | | | | | | 65 |
| 2 | (Germany) Pascal Wehrlein | | 3 | 10 | **1** | **1** | | | **1** | | 44 |
| 3 | (Netherlands) Robin Frijns | 14^{E} | 4 | 2 | 5 | | | | | | 40 |
| 4 | (Belgium) Stoffel Vandoorne | 2 | **5** | **5** | 2 | | | **1** | | | 40 |
| 5 | (Switzerland) Neel Jani | 15^{E} | 12 | 4 | 4 | | | | | | 24 |
| 6 | (New Zealand) Nick Cassidy | 4 | 2 | | | | | | | | 19 |
| 7 | (Switzerland) Nico Müller | 5 | 13^{E} | 3 | 8 | | | | | | 19 |
| 8 | (United Kingdom) Oliver Rowland | 6 | 6 | 15^{E} | 6 | | 1 | | | **1** | 16 |
| 9 | (United Kingdom) Oliver Turvey | 10 | 7 | 6 | 18^{E} | | | | | | 14 |
| 10 | (Netherlands) Nyck de Vries | 22^{E} | 23^{E} | 7 | 22^{E} | | | | | | 6 |
| 11 | (Germany) André Lotterer | 3 | 20^{E} | 17^{E} | 7 | | | | | | 6 |
| 12 | (Brazil) Felipe Massa | 19^{E} | 8 | 20^{E} | 15^{E} | | | | | | 4 |
| 13 | (United Kingdom) James Calado | 12^{E} | 21^{E} | 8 | 11 | | | | | | 4 |
| 14 | (Belgium) Jérôme d'Ambrosio | DNS | 9 | 12 | 14^{E} | | | | | | 2 |
| 15 | (China) Ma Qinghua | 13^{E} | 11 | 22^{E} | 9 | | | | | | 2 |
| 16 | (United Kingdom) Alexander Sims | 21^{E} | 10 | 14^{E} | 12 | | | | | | 1 |
| 17 | (Switzerland) Edoardo Mortara | WD | 14^{E} | 16^{E} | 10 | | | | | | 1 |
| 18 | (France) Jean-Éric Vergne | 8 | 22^{E} | 9 (Note: Vergne was penalised after the race and did not receive any points.) | 21^{E} | | | | | | 0 |
| 19 | (Switzerland) Sébastien Buemi | | 18^{E} | 11 | 16^{E} | | | | | | 0 |
| 20 | (Brazil) Lucas di Grassi | 17^{E} | DNS | 13^{E} | 17^{E} | | | | | | 0 |
| 21 | (New Zealand) Brendon Hartley | 16^{E} | 16^{E} | WD | 13^{E} | | | | | | 0 |
| 22 | (Germany) Daniel Abt | 11^{E} | 15^{E} | 23^{E} | 19^{E} | | DSQ | | | | 0 |
| 23 | (New Zealand) Mitch Evans | 7 | 17^{E} | 18^{E} | 24^{E} | | | | | | 0 |
| 24 | (Portugal) António Félix da Costa | 20^{E} | 19^{E} | 21^{E} | 23^{E} | | | | | | 0 |
| 25 | (United Kingdom) Sam Bird | | | 19^{E} | 20^{E} | | | | | | 0 |
| | (South Africa) Kelvin van der Linde | | | | | | | | | | |
| – | (United Kingdom) Jann Mardenborough | 9 | | | | | | | | | |
| – | (Belgium) Sam Dejonghe | 18^{E} | | | | | | | | | |
| Pos. | Driver | MCO (Monaco) | HKG (Hong Kong) | LES (United States) | MCO (Monaco) | HKG (Hong Kong) | BER (Germany) | NYC (United States) | TBA | TBA | Pts |

| Colour | Result |
|---|---|
| Gold | Winner |
| Silver | Second place |
| Bronze | Third place |
| Green | Points classification |
| Blue | Non-points classification |
| Blue | Non-classified finish (NC) |
| Purple | Retired, not classified (Ret) |
| Red | Did not qualify (DNQ) |
| Red | Did not pre-qualify (DNPQ) |
| Black | Disqualified (DSQ) |
| White | Did not start (DNS) |
| White | Withdrew (WD) |
| White | Race cancelled (C) |
| Blank | Did not practice (DNP) |
| Blank | Did not arrive (DNA) |
| Blank | Excluded (EX) |

**Bold** – Pole
Italics – Fastest lap
^{E} – Eliminated

=== Challenge Grid standings ===
| Pos. | Driver | MCO (Monaco) | HKG (Hong Kong) | LES (United States) | MCO (Monaco) | HKG (Hong Kong) | BER (Germany) | NYC (United States) | TBA | TBA | Pts |
|---|---|---|---|---|---|---|---|---|---|---|---|
| 1 | (Slovenia) Kevin Siggy | 2 | 3 | 2 | **1** | | | | | | 61 |
| 2 | (Bulgaria) Peyo Peev | | 23^{E} | **1** | 3 | | | | | | 42 |
| 3 | (Croatia) Petar Brljak | 4 | **2** | 5 | 4 | | | | | | 41 |
| 4 | (Germany) Lucas Müller | | 13^{E} | 3 | 2 | | | | | | 33 |
| 5 | (Australia) Joshua Rogers | | 1 | DNP | | | | | | | 25 |
| 6 | (Germany) Jan von der Heyde | | 7^{6} | 4 | 11^{E} | | | | | | 20 |
| 7 | (United Kingdom) Jacob Reid | | 17^{E} | 7 | 5 | | | | | | 16 |
| 8 | (Germany) Ben Hitz | | 9^{8} | 6 | 9 | | | | | | 14 |
| 9 | (Finland) Olli Pahkala | 5 | 4 | DNP | | | | | | | 12 |
| 10 | (North Macedonia) Erhan Jajovski | 18^{E} | 5 | 21^{E} | | | | | | | 10 |
| 11 | (Portugal) Nuno Pinto | | 11^{10} | 16^{E} | 6 | | | | | | 9 |
| 12 | (Netherlands) Remco Majoor | | | | 7 | | | | | | 6 |
| 13 | (Poland) Kuba Brzezinski | | 8^{7} | 22^{E} | | | | | | | 6 |
| 14 | (Netherlands) Niek Jacobs | | | 9 | 8 | | | | | | 6 |
| 15 | (Switzerland) Markus Keller | | | 8 | 13^{E} | | | | | | 4 |
| 16 | (Greece) Jim Parisis | | 10^{9} | 14^{E} | | | | | | | 2 |
| 17 | (Netherlands) Noah Reuvers | | 14^{E} | 11^{10} | 10 | | | | | | 2 |
| 18 | (Germany) Marc Gassner | 3 | 12 | | | | | | | | 0 |
| 19 | (Sweden) Eric Stranne | | | | 12 | DNPQ | | | | | 0 |
| 20 | (Austria) Lorenz Hörzing | | 16^{E} | DNPQ | DNPQ | | | | | | 0 |
| 21 | (United Kingdom) Alisdair Irvine | | | | 16^{E} | | | | | | 0 |
| 22 | (Poland) Nikodem Wisniewski | | | 17^{E} | | | | | | | 0 |
| 23 | (United Kingdom) Chris Shepherd | | | 18^{E} | DNPQ | DNP | | | | | 0 |
| 24 | (Italy) Matteo Topa | | | | 18^{E} | DNPQ | | | | | 0 |
| 25 | (Germany) Joel Schmitt | | | 19^{E} | | | | | | | 0 |
| 26 | (Czech Republic) Jiří Toman | | 21^{E} | | | | | | | | 0 |
| 27 | (France) Kevin Morville | | | | 21^{E} | DNPQ | | | | | 0 |
| 28 | (Poland) Zbigniew Siara | | 22^{E} | DNPQ | DNPQ | | | | | | 0 |
| 29 | (Norway) Scott Søvik | | | | 23^{E} | | | | | | 0 |
| 30 | (United Kingdom) Alex Cooper | | | DNS | | DNPQ | | | | | 0 |
| – | (United Kingdom) Graham Carroll | **1** | | | | DNP | | | | | |
| – | (Norway) Jarl Teien | 6 | | DNPQ | | | | | | | |
| – | (United Kingdom) Brandon Williams | 8 | DNPQ | | | | | | | | |
| – | (United Kingdom) Jack Ashton | 10 | | DNPQ | | | | | | | |
| – | (Netherlands) Hany Alsabti | 11^{E} | | | | | | | | | |
| – | (Germany) Moritz Löhner | 12^{E} | | | | | | | | | |
| – | (United Kingdom) Jimmy Broadbent | 14^{E} | | | | | | | | | |
| – | (United Kingdom) Steve Alvarez Brown | 15^{E} | | | | | | | | | |
| – | (China) Liu Zexuan | 17^{E} | | | | | | | | | |
| – | (Mexico) Ricardo Sanchez | 19^{E} | | | | | | | | | |
| – | (United Kingdom) Kai Bachini | 22^{E} | | | | | | | | | |
| – | (Italy) Marco Santoni | | | DNP | | | | | | | |
| – | (Greece) Stavros Mouzaidis | | | | DNP | | | | | | |
Guest drivers ineligible for points
| – | (United Kingdom) James Rossiter | 9 | 6 | | | | | | | | |
| – | (Spain) Daniel Juncadella | 7 | | | | | | | | | |
| – | (United Kingdom) Alex Lynn | | | 10 | 14^{E} | | | | | | |
| – | (Switzerland) Simona de Silvestro | | | 12 | 17^{E} | | | | | | |
| – | (Sweden) Joel Eriksson | 13^{E} | 15^{E} | | | | | | | | |
| – | (South Africa) Kelvin van der Linde | | | 13^{E} | | | | | | | |
| – | (United Kingdom) Charlie Martin | 20^{E} | 18^{E} | 15^{E} | 24^{E} | | | | | | |
| – | (United Kingdom) Axel LaFlamme | | 19^{E} | 20^{E} | 15^{E} | | | | | | |
| – | (United Kingdom) Archie Hamilton | 16^{E} | 20^{E} | | | | | | | | |
| – | (Germany) Sophia Flörsch | | | | 20^{E} | | | | | | |
| – | (United Kingdom) Mike Channell | 21^{E} | 24^{E} | 23^{E} | | | | | | | |
| – | (United Kingdom) Gareth Paterson | | | | 22^{E} | | | | | | |
| Pos. | Driver | MCO (Monaco) | HKG (Hong Kong) | LES (United States) | MCO (Monaco) | HKG (Hong Kong) | BER (Germany) | NYC (United States) | TBA | TBA | Pts |

| Colour | Result |
|---|---|
| Gold | Winner |
| Silver | Second place |
| Bronze | Third place |
| Green | Points classification |
| Blue | Non-points classification |
| Blue | Non-classified finish (NC) |
| Purple | Retired, not classified (Ret) |
| Red | Did not qualify (DNQ) |
| Red | Did not pre-qualify (DNPQ) |
| Black | Disqualified (DSQ) |
| White | Did not start (DNS) |
| White | Withdrew (WD) |
| White | Race cancelled (C) |
| Blank | Did not practice (DNP) |
| Blank | Did not arrive (DNA) |
| Blank | Excluded (EX) |

**Bold** – Pole
Italics – Fastest lap
^{Superscript} – Point-scoring position
^{E} – Eliminated
