= Lawrence Yu Kam-kee =

Hong Kong businessman

Lawrence Yu Kam-Kee
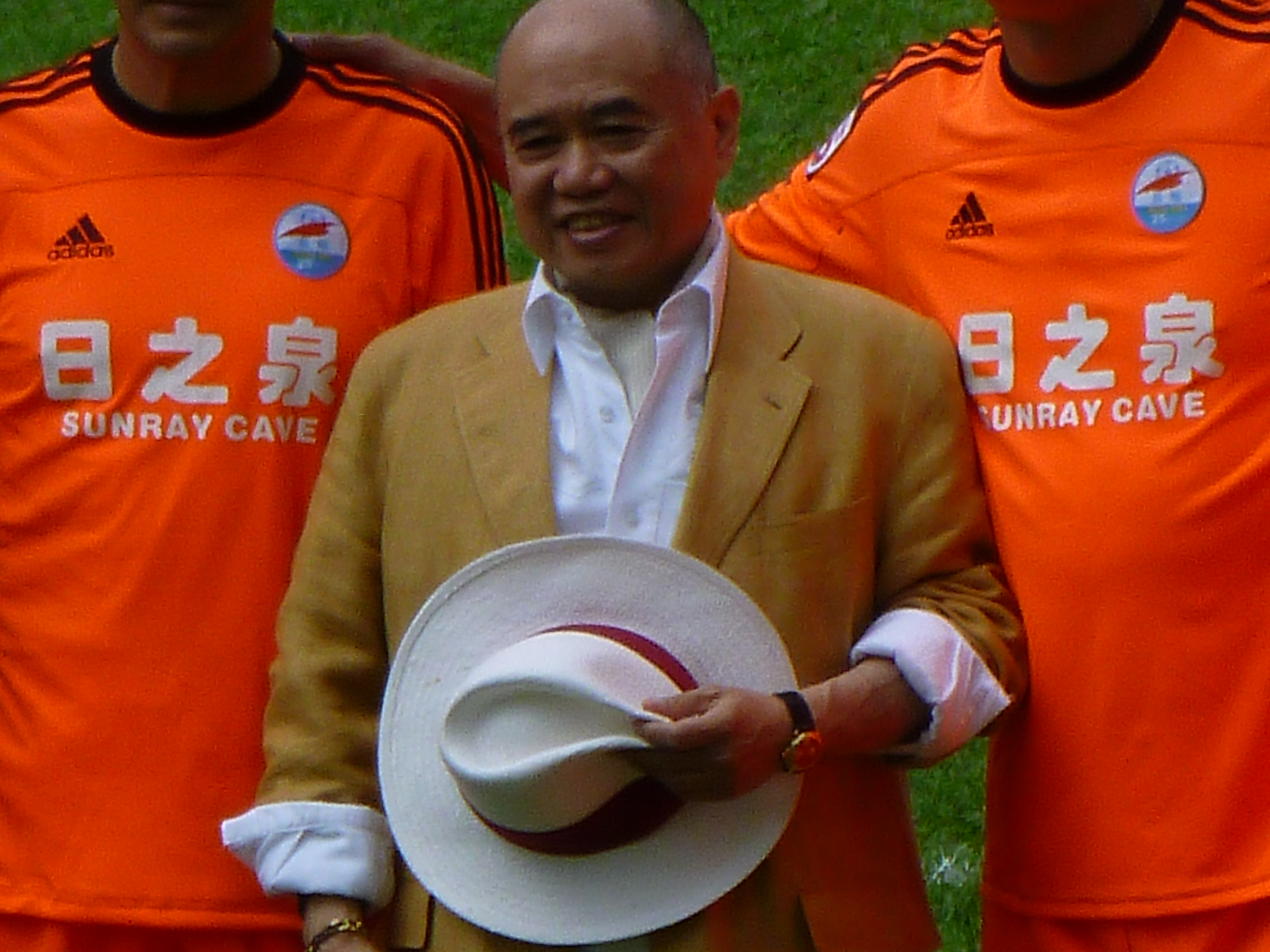
- Born: 1946 (age 79–80)
- Occupation: Entrepreneur

Lawrence Yu Kam-kee MBE, BBS, JP (Chinese: 余錦基, born 1946) is a prominent Hong Kong businessman.

== Biography ==
He graduated from the Diocesan Boys' School in the 1960s.

He is currently serving as the Chairman of the China Renji Medical Group Limited.

He is the former Chairman of the Hong Kong Community Chest Fund and the Hong Kong Football Association.

In 2021, he contracted COVID and spent 15 days in the hospital.

== Filmography ==
- Night Caller (1985)
