= Lung Wo Road =

Road in Hong Kong

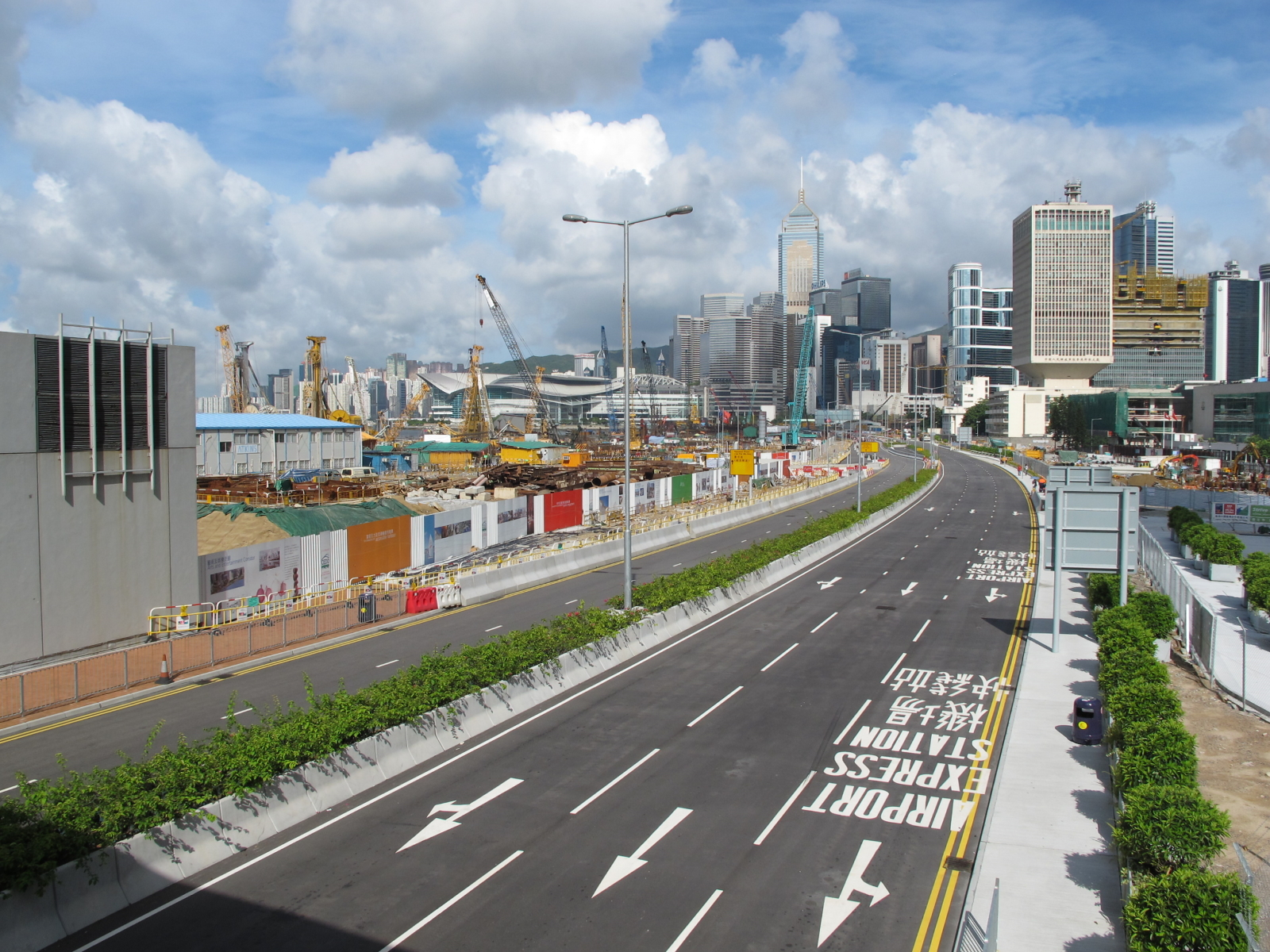
Lung Wo Road

Lung Wo Road (Chinese: 龍和道) is a road between Central and Wan Chai, Hong Kong. It is constructed in three phases as part of the Central and Wan Chai Reclamation. The first two phases are completed by 2010 and 2011 respectively and the third was expected to be completed in 2017.

The road is located at the northern side of Edinburgh Place, at approximately the sites of the former Queen's Pier and Edinburgh Place Ferry Pier, as well as reclaimed lands from Victoria Harbour.

== See also ==
- List of streets and roads in Hong Kong
