= 2017 Paris ePrix =

Race 6 of 12 of the 2016–17 Formula E Championship
← Previous race	Next race →
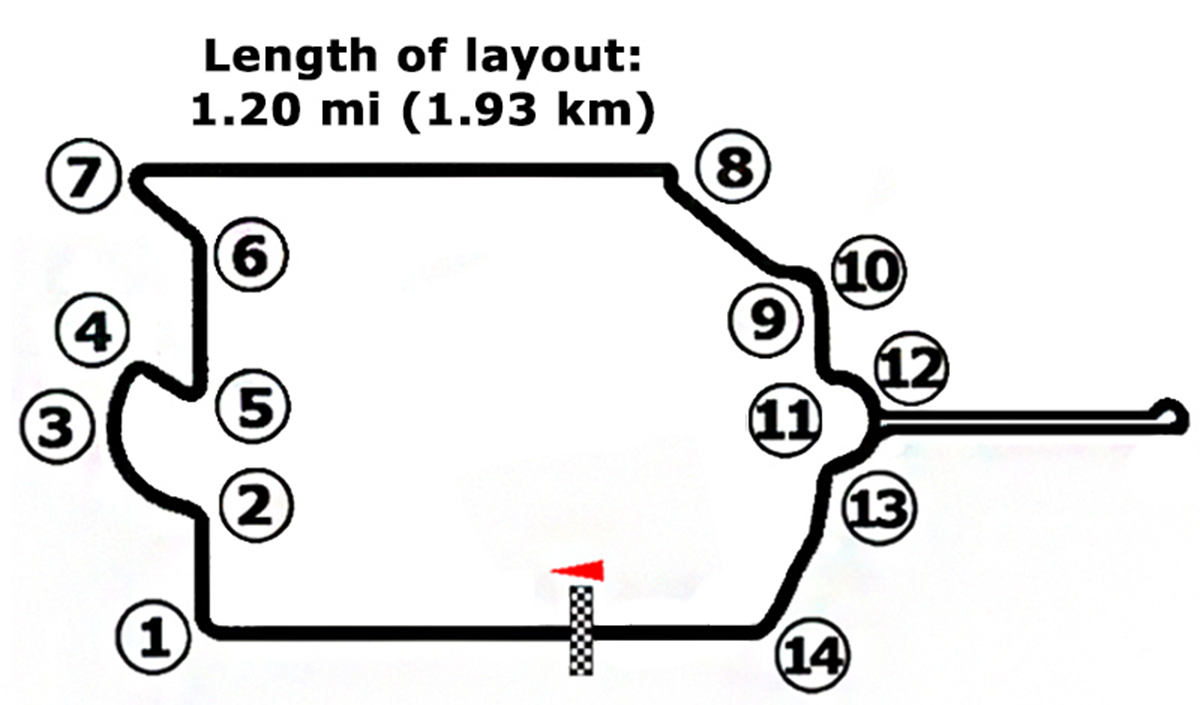
- Layout of the Paris Formula E street circuit

Race details
- Date: 20 May 2017
- Official name: 2017 Qatar Airways Paris ePrix
- Location: Circuit des Invalides, Les Invalides, Paris, France
- Course: Street circuit
- Course length: 1.93 km (1.20 miles)
- Distance: 49 laps, 94.598 km (58.781 miles)
- Weather: Sunny, Air: 17.9 to 19.0 °C (64.2 to 66.2 °F), Track: 32.2 to 34.4 °C (90.0 to 93.9 °F)
- Attendance: 46,000

Pole position
Driver	(Switzerland) Sébastien Buemi	e.Dams-Renault
- Time: 1:02.319

Fastest lap
Driver	(United Kingdom) Sam Bird	Virgin-Citroën
- Time: 1:02.422 on lap 42

Podium
First	(Switzerland) Sébastien Buemi	e.Dams-Renault
Second	(Argentina) José María López	Virgin-Citroën
Third	(Germany) Nick Heidfeld	Mahindra

The 2017 Paris ePrix (formally the 2017 Qatar Airways Paris ePrix) was a Formula E electric motor race held on 20 May 2017 at the Circuit des Invalides in the Les Invalides building complex before a crowd of 46,000 people. It was the sixth race of the 2016–17 Formula E Championship and the second Paris ePrix. e.Dams-Renault driver Sébastien Buemi won the 49-lap race from pole position. José María López finished second for the Virgin team and Mahindra driver Nick Heidfeld third.

Buemi won the pole position by recording the fastest time in qualifying and held off second-placed starter Jean-Éric Vergne to keep the lead at the start of the race. Buemi pulled away from Vergne but the field was closed after a crash between championship rival Lucas di Grassi and António Félix da Costa on the 16th lap brought out a full course yellow. All drivers, including Buemi, made their mandatory pit stops to switch into a second car as a consequence of the accident. Buemi regained the lead three laps after the restart from Mike Conway when the latter made his own stop to switch into his second car. Vergne crashed on lap 34 which caused the safety car to be deployed. Buemi held off López at the restart four laps later and led the rest of the race to claim the victory. There were three lead changes among three different drivers during the course of the race.

It was Buemi's fifth victory of the season, the eleventh of his career, and his first in Paris. The result extended Buemi's Drivers' Championship advantage to 43 points ahead of di Grassi, and his teammate Nico Prost maintained third place. Heidfeld's strong finish moved him to fourth and Vergne's failure to finish meant he to fifth. e.Dams-Renault consolidated their lead in the Teams' Championship to 75 points in front of the non-scoring Audi Sport ABT, and Mahindra kept third position with six races left in the season.

== Background ==
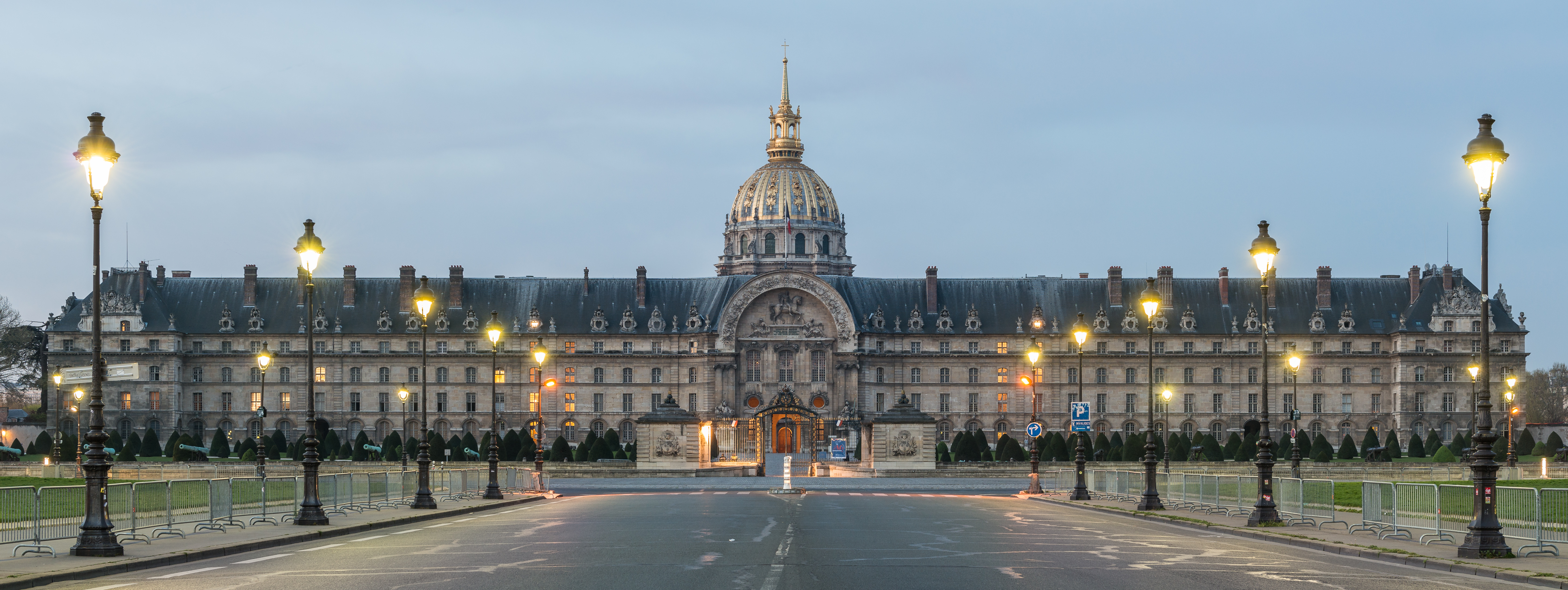
The Esplanade des Invalides, where the track's pit lane was located.

The Paris ePrix was confirmed as part of Formula E's 2016–17 series schedule in September 2016 by the FIA World Motor Sport Council. It was the sixth of twelve scheduled single-seater electric car races of the 2016–17 Championship, the second Paris ePrix, and was held on 20 May 2017 at the Circuit des Invalides in the Les Invalides building complex. The 2016 race was held in April but the 2017 edition was moved to May to enable teams and drivers to drive in better weather. The Circuit des Invalides is 1.93 km (1.20 mi) long, run in an clockwise direction and is composed of 14 turns.

Before the race e.Dams-Renault driver Sébastien Buemi led the Drivers' Championship with 104 points, 15 ahead of Lucas di Grassi in second and a further 43 in front of third-placed Nico Prost. Jean-Éric Vergne was fourth with 40 points and Sam Bird was fifth with 34 points. e.Dams-Renault led the Teams' Championship with 152 points; Audi Sport ABT were in second place on 115 points. Mahindra stood in third with 60 points, while Techeetah and Virgin contended for fourth position.

Buemi, the pre-race favourite, stated that after winning the Monaco ePrix one week prior, he ventured to Paris with more motivation to achieve another podium finish, saying: "It's a special weekend for us with the team and I will do my best to continue our top form." José María López stated he felt his team were due a good finish after a sub-par performance in Monaco and had prepared extensively for the race. He looked forward to competing in Paris for the first time and expected to achieve a decent points-scoring position. Mahindra's Nick Heidfeld said he sought another podium finish to allow Mahindra to retain third place in the Teams' Championship but was wary of cold weather causing several cars to struggle on cold tyre temperatures. Vergne spoke of his belief Paris would be his "best race of the year" and praised the work the city put in to hold the race, "The Paris track is not the kind of track we have been to except for Hong Kong – really bumpy, narrow, difficult to drive – so we'll see how it goes."

A total of 10 squads each entering two participants for a total of 20 drivers for the race. There were two driver changes for the race. Loïc Duval (Dragon) and Maro Engel (Venturi) were unable to drive in Paris because of a Deutsche Tourenwagen Masters commitment at the Lausitzring and were replaced by Toyota World Endurance Championship (WEC) driver Mike Conway and the Formula V8 3.5 Series champion Tom Dillmann. Conway had previously tested for Dragon in the first season's pre-season testing session at Donington Park and returned to the sport the following season to drive for Venturi in the campaign's final seven races. Dillmann had prior experience driving for Venturi with his participation in the Mexico City ePrix shakedown session in place of regular driver Stéphane Sarrazin who attended the WEC pre-season test session at the Autodromo Nazionale di Monza for Toyota. Formula Two driver Nyck de Vries had been considered for the role before Dillmann was selected. Dillmann stated in a press release that he was "delighted" to take part in the event and expressed his desire to contest a full season of the series in the future.

== Practice ==
Two practice sessions—both on Saturday morning—were held before the Saturday late afternoon race. The first session ran for 45 minutes and the second for 30 minutes. A 30-minute shakedown session was held on late Friday afternoon without any major incidents but no lap times were officially published by Formula E. Both of the practice sessions took place in dry weather. In the first practice session, Buemi used 200 kW (270 hp) of power to record the fastest time of 1 minute, 1.998 seconds, seven-tenths of a second faster than López in second. Vergne, Di Grassi, Felix Rosenqvist, Bird, Conway, Nelson Piquet Jr., Heidfeld and Prost made up positions three to ten. Bird's car shut down because of a power failure at the exit of the first turn. He abandoned his vehicle at the side of the track, and first practice was stopped temporarily after three minutes. Bird's teammate López caused a brief full course yellow flag period when he gently collided with the turn one barrier. He was able to reverse out of the corner and drove to the pit lane. Esteban Gutiérrez went onto a run-off area, and both Audi Sport ABT drivers locked their tyres, reversing out of the turn one escape road. Di Grassi recorded the second session's fastest lap late into a qualifying simulation at 1 minute, 1.359 seconds; he was two-tenths of a second faster than López in second. Buemi, Daniel Abt, Bird, Rosenqvist, Prost, Oliver Turvey of NextEV, Vergne and Andretti's Robin Frijns occupied positions three through ten. During the second practice, where multiple drivers ran deep onto the turn one run-off area, Conway pushed hard, causing him to lose control of his car's rear at the final corner. He spun but avoided damage to his vehicle.

== Qualifying ==
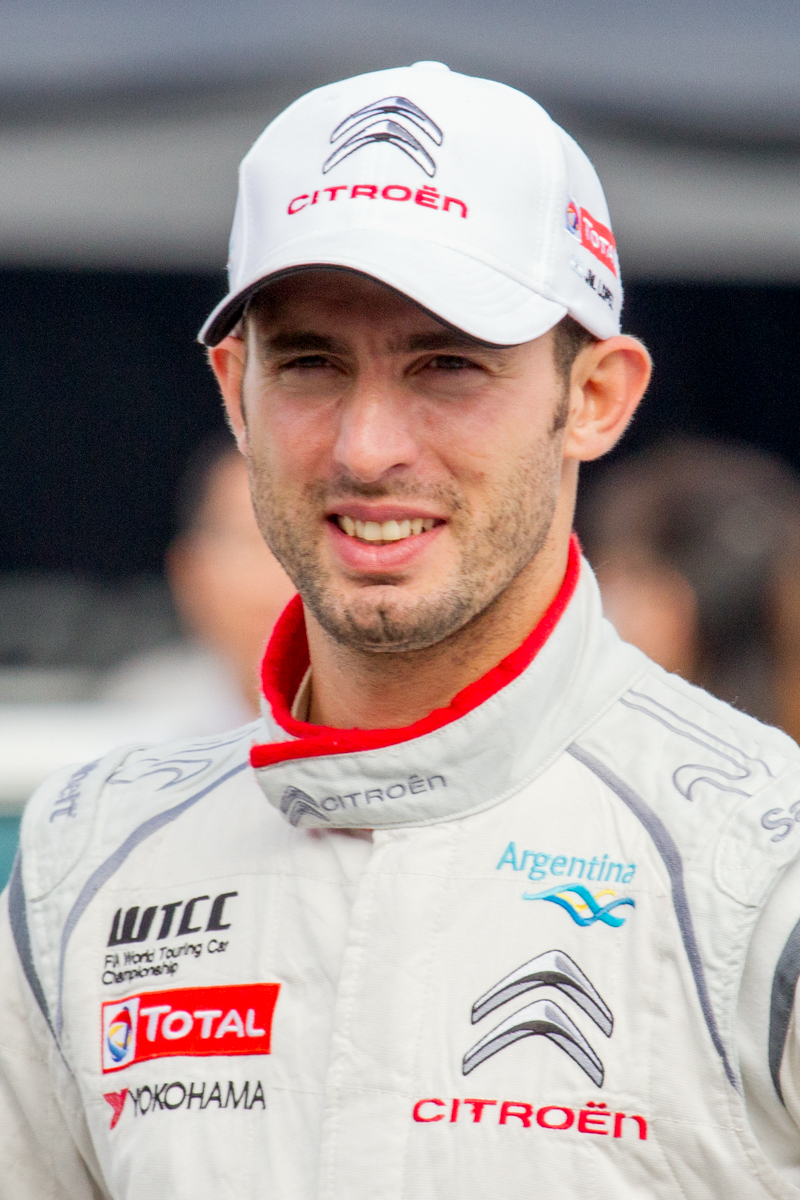
José María López (pictured in 2014) qualified third and escaped being penalised after using too much electrical energy on his super pole lap.

Saturday afternoon's qualifying session ran for 60 minutes and was divided into four groups of five cars. Each group was determined by a lottery system and was permitted six minutes of on-track activity. All drivers were limited to two timed laps with one at maximum power. The fastest five overall competitors in the four groups participated in a "Super Pole" session with one driver on the track at any time going out in reverse order from fifth to first. Each of the five drivers was limited to one timed lap and the starting order was determined by the competitor's fastest times (Super Pole from first to fifth, and group qualifying from sixth to twentieth). The driver and team who recorded the fastest time were awarded three points towards their respective championships. Qualifying took place in dry weather.

Lap times were slower than the previous year's session because of subtle track surface changes and new tyres provided by Michelin. In the first group of five drivers, which saw no one venture out of their garages and onto the track for the first three minutes because they were unwilling to see who would be the first to set a benchmark lap, Buemi set the fastest overall lap in group qualifying with a lap of 1 minute, 2.171 seconds, ahead of Rosenqvist, di Grassi. Abt and Bird. López was fastest in the track's first third of the lap to lead the second group, followed by Mitch Evans (Jaguar) and Prost, Conway and Piquet. In the third group, local favourite Vergne went second-fastest overall, with Turvey 0.110 seconds slower. Gutiérrez, Jérôme d'Ambrosio and Stéphane Sarrazin (Andretti and Venturi) completed the third group. Sarrazin pulled over to the side of the track when his powertrain switched off during his minimum power lap, before restarting his car. This allowed him to continue, although the problem meant he started from last on the grid. Despite going the fastest of any competitor in the fourth group, Heidfeld narrowly missed out on qualifying for the super pole, while second-quickest driver Frijns was also not able to advance further by less than a tenth of a second. Dillmann, António Félix da Costa and Adam Carroll (Andretti and Jaguar) competed the fourth group's running order. After group qualifying ended, Buemi, Vergne, Turvey, López and Gutiérrez qualified for super pole.

Gutiérrez was the first driver to attempt his super pole lap and recorded fast times before locking his brakes and running deep into the turn eight escape road, and was restricted to fifth. López, seeking his first pole position in Formula E, was the next competitor to drive onto the track and took third, but was investigated for the inadvertent usage of excessive electrical energy on his out-lap after mistakenly switching his car's settings. Although no penalty was applied, the switching of settings damaged his car's battery, leading to it being changed before the race. Turvey was fastest in the first third of the lap before a small error in the following section left him fourth. Vergne was faster than López to move into provisional pole position. Buemi was the final driver to set his lap, and despite making small errors in the final third of the lap took pole position with a time of 1 minute, 2.319 seconds. The time gap to Vergne was 0.006 seconds, the closest in Formula E history. (Note: The record was further surpassed when di Grassi qualified 0.001 seconds ahead of López at the Berlin ePrix.) It was Buemi's second consecutive pole position, and the eighth of his career. After qualifying ended, Turvey was demoted ten places on the grid because his team changed a powertrain component. Following penalties, the rest of the grid order was set as Heidfeld, Rosenqvist, Frijns, Evans, Prost, Conway, Piquet, d'Ambrosio, di Grassi, Turvey, Dillmann, Abt, Félix da Costa, Bird, Carroll and Sarrazin.

=== Qualifying classification ===
Final qualifying classification
Pos.	No.	Driver	Team	GS	SP	Grid
1	9	(Switzerland) Sébastien Buemi	e.Dams-Renault	1:02.171	1:02.319	1
2	25	(France) Jean-Éric Vergne	Techeetah-Renault	1:02.274	1:02.325	2
3	37	(Argentina) José María López	Virgin-Citroën	1:02.459	1:02.640	3
4	88	(United Kingdom) Oliver Turvey	NextEV NIO	1:02.384	1:02.910	14^{1}
5	33	(Mexico) Esteban Gutiérrez	Techeetah-Renault	1:02.597	1:13.287	4
6	23	(Germany) Nick Heidfeld	Mahindra	1:02.611	—N/a	5
7	19	(Sweden) Felix Rosenqvist	Mahindra	1:02.617	—N/a	6
8	27	(Netherlands) Robin Frijns	Andretti-BMW	1:02.654	—N/a	7
9	20	(New Zealand) Mitch Evans	Jaguar	1:02.687	—N/a	8
10	8	(France) Nico Prost	e.Dams-Renault	1:02.746	—N/a	9
11	6	(United Kingdom) Mike Conway	Dragon-Penske	1:02.808	—N/a	10
12	3	(Brazil) Nelson Piquet Jr.	NextEV NIO	1:02.810	—N/a	11
13	7	(Belgium) Jérôme d'Ambrosio	Dragon-Penske	1:02.814	—N/a	12
14	11	(Brazil) Lucas di Grassi	Audi Sport ABT	1:02.840	—N/a	13
15	5	(France) Tom Dillmann	Venturi	1:03.024	—N/a	15
16	66	(Germany) Daniel Abt	Audi Sport ABT	1:03.071	—N/a	16
17	28	(Portugal) António Félix da Costa	Andretti-BMW	1:03.268	—N/a	17
18	2	(United Kingdom) Sam Bird	Virgin-Citroën	1:03.573	—N/a	18
19	47	(United Kingdom) Adam Carroll	Jaguar	1:03.771	—N/a	19
20	4	(France) Stéphane Sarrazin	Venturi	1:06.121	—N/a	20

Notes:

- ^1 — Oliver Turvey was demoted ten places for changing his powertrain.

== Race ==
A special feature of Formula E is the "Fan Boost" feature, an additional 100 kW (130 hp) of power to use in the driver's second car. The three drivers who were allowed to use the boost were determined by a fan vote. For the Paris race, Buemi, di Grassi and Abt were handed the extra power. The race began at 16:00 Central European Summer Time (UTC+2). The weather at the start were dry and sunny with an air temperature between 17.9 to 19.0 °C (64 to 66 °F) and a track temperature from 32.2 to 34.4 °C (90 to 94 °F); a 10 per cent chance of rain was forecast. 46,000 people attended the ePrix due to an expansion in seating and lower ticket prices; organisers had initially expected 10,000 people to attend. Buemi held off Vergne on the outside line to lead the field on the approach into the first corner. López narrowly avoided colliding with Vergne, and the latter was pressured by the fast-starting Heidfeld who passed Gutiérrez. Abt made the best start in the field, gaining four positions by the end of the first lap, while Turvey and di Grassi dropped the same number of positions over the same distance. At the end of the first lap, Buemi led from Vergne, López, Heidfeld, Gutiérrez, Rosenqvist, Frijns, Evans, Prost and d'Ambrosio.

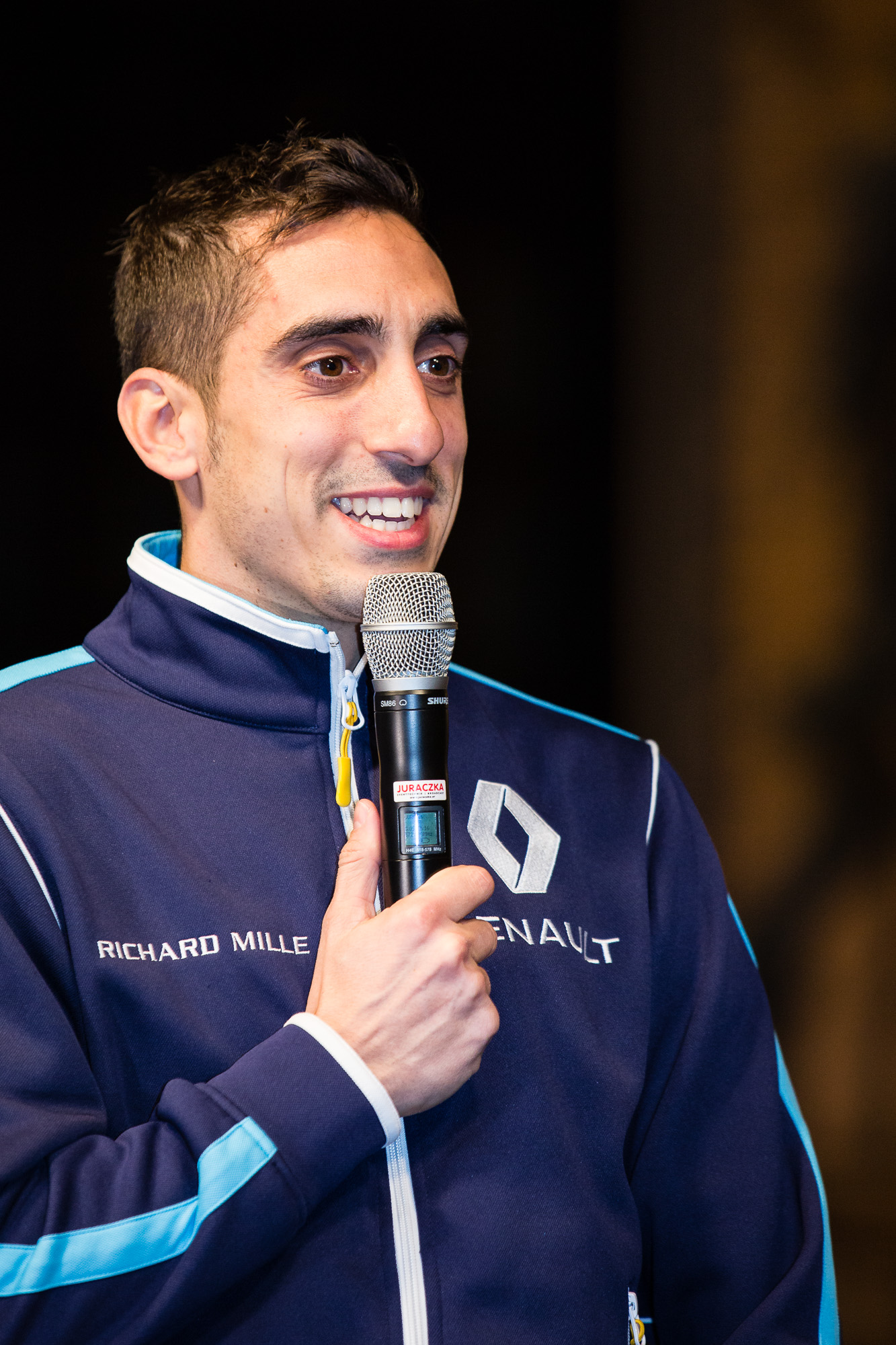
Sébastien Buemi (pictured in 2016) took the pole position and won his fifth race of the season after leading a race-high of 44 laps.

After the first lap passed without any major incidents, the field settled down for the time being before the first on-track battles commenced. After three laps, Buemi held a one-second advantage over Vergne. Gutiérrez was driving slower than the cars around him and was overtaken by Rosenqvist for fifth place on the seventh lap. Following the loss of fifth, Gutiérrez continued to struggle to match the pace of the top five drivers. He led a six-car battle for sixth place but benefited from the track's tight nature to remain there. Di Grassi had difficulty getting ahead of Dillmann and Félix da Costa gained on di Grassi and started to attack him. Félix da Costa overtook di Grassi heading into turn one but di Grassi remained close behind. On lap 20, di Grassi attempted to overtake Félix da Costa on the outside into turn seven, and moved ahead before the braking area. Di Grassi then steered right to take the turn with his car's right-rear corner level with Félix da Costa's front-left wheel, causing the two to collide. After Félix da Costa hit the inside barrier, both cars speared into the outside wall.

Di Grassi was able to restart but Félix da Costa's race ended prematurely and the full course yellow flag was shown to allow officials to retrieve his car. Most of the field, including Buemi, used the opportunity to make the mandatory switch into their second cars as a consequence of the accident. Conway elected not to enter the pit lane and led the field back up to speed at the lap 23 restart. Di Grassi took advantage of the situation to move into tenth. Conway made his pit stop on lap 26, handing the lead back to Buemi, whose advantage over Vergne had been reduced to slightly more than one second. Di Grassi overtook Prost with FanBoost for eighth the following lap. Frijns passed Gutiérrez for sixth place and the latter lost seventh and eighth to di Grassi and Prost soon after. The stewards handed Di Grassi and Carroll drive-through penalties for being under the minimum pit stop time; di Grassi took his penalty on the 31st lap, emerging in 18th behind Carroll, but returned to the pit lane for car repairs two laps later. Vergne was drawing closer to Buemi on lap 34, but suspected something broke on his car, which loosened his steering. Vergne ran wide leaving turn 13, damaging his vehicle's front-right corner in a collision with a barrier and ending his race. Vergne's stranded car necessitated the deployment of the safety car, with López elevated to second and Heidfeld third. D'Ambrosio drove into his garage on lap 35 to retire with mechanical issues.

Racing resumed on lap 38 and López got close to Buemi but could not take the lead. Di Grassi elected to make a pit stop and temporarily set the race's fastest lap. Frijns, Dillmann and Gutiérrez were issued five-second time penalties after they were observed speeding under full course yellow flag conditions. Bird went faster than di Grassi to record the race's fastest lap of 1 minute, 2.422 on lap 42, earning him one point in the Drivers' Championship. With three laps remaining, di Grassi locked his brakes and crashed at turn eight with the front of his car. As was the case the previous year, the race finished behind the safety car. Drivers were not permitted to overtake and Buemi took his fifth victory of the season, the eleventh of his career, and his first in Paris. López finished second, 0.707 seconds behind, achieving his first Formula E podium, and Heidfeld took his second consecutive third-place finish. Abt caused confusion when his car stopped on the track halfway before the start/finish line with a battery management system failure; drivers behind him were hesitant to pass him for fear of being penalised, creating a large blockade on the narrow backstraight. Rosenqvist finished fourth and Prost fifth. Frijns was demoted to sixth after his time penalty was applied. Piquet, Dillmann, Evans and Sarrazin rounded out the top ten. Gutiérrez finished 11th after his time penalty was enforced. Turvey, Abt, Conway, Carroll and Bird were the final classified finishers. There were three lead changes in the race; three drivers reached the front of the field. Buemi led twice for a total of 44 laps, out of 49.

=== Post-race ===
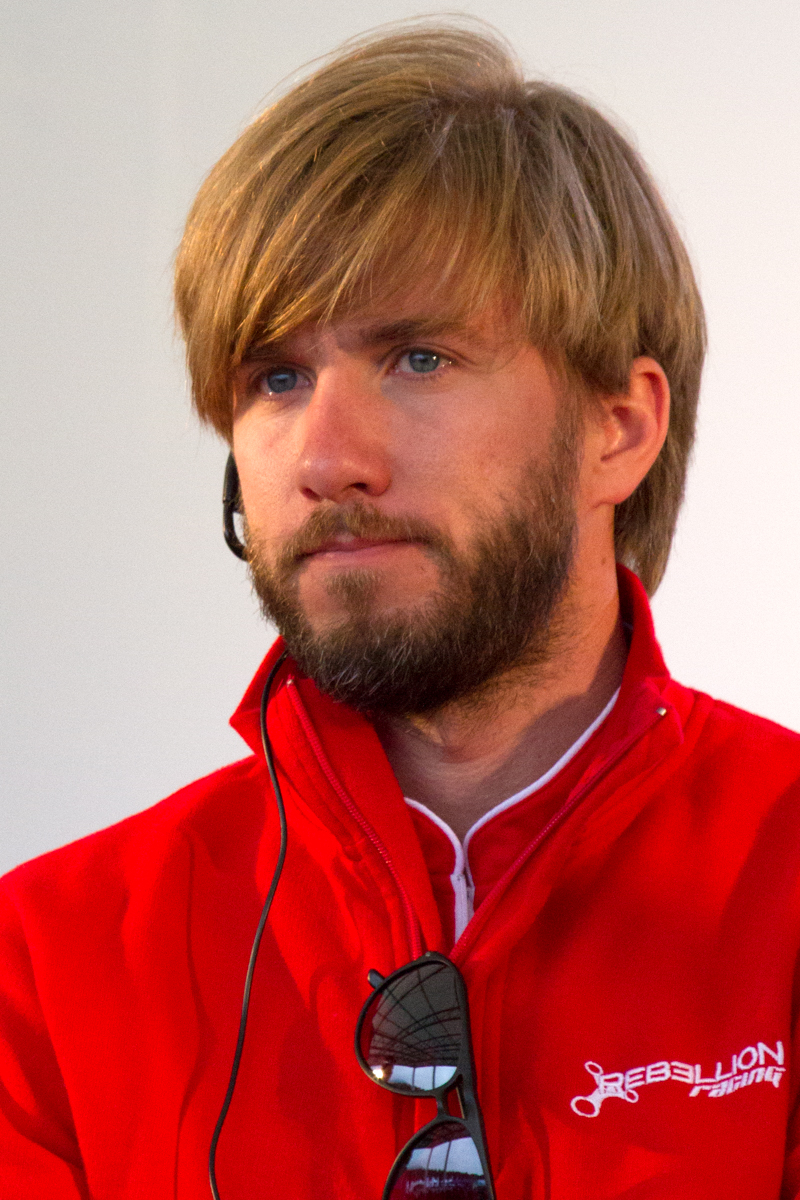
Nick Heidfeld (pictured in 2014) finished in third place, the second consecutive ePrix he finished there.

The top three drivers appeared on the podium to collect their trophies and spoke to the media at a later press conference. Buemi revealed he attempted to brake as late as possible to prevent Vergne from overtaking him at the start but had used more electrical energy than expected when he established an advantage. He stated that he lost some time under full course yellow conditions but when Vergne retired, he "was having a nice time, as he was putting me under pressure." Buemi stated his belief he would not have won had e.Dams-Renault not repaired his car's powertrain at their technical headquarters in Viry-Châtillon. However he spoke of his feeling the team deserved the victory more than him due to them overcoming the preceding year's problems with track conditions. López said from the beginning of the season, his car was good, but he was not yet experienced enough to be competitive. However, he stated his team "worked hard" in the event at a track which he liked and said he felt it played a role in his second-place result. Third-place finisher Heidfeld stated it felt "great" to have achieved his second consecutive podium result, and that it was "another exciting race", and his team were more competitive than they were in Monaco. He said it was "a great result" for Mahindra, and that they would not stop until they had achieved their objective of securing their first victory.

The stewards investigated the collision between di Grassi and Félix da Costa but elected to take no action towards the latter, and di Grassi spoke to Félix da Costa post-race. Di Grassi claimed Félix da Costa "didn't know how to race today" and that he was passed "very harshly". He admitted to have not seen Félix da Costa after overtaking him: "That's the price of starting at the back, there's always these risks. That generated the crash and then this chaotic domino effect that really was a day to forget." Félix da Costa blamed di Grassi for causing the collision, claiming the latter was "out of character" and saying he would not have thought di Grassi would attempt such a manoeuvre. He added while di Grassi was intelligent, he steered earlier than expected which put him into the wall: "He was being very clever – I overtook him and he was staying there. But one lap to another his mind just switched, he tried to overtake me like 20 times in five corners. He was all over me, and then he was just trying desperate moves everywhere." Di Grassi said his team would forget about the event because of him going from being the fastest driver in the second practice session to having a slow qualifying lap and would recover for the next race of the season.

Vergne stated his belief he could have challenged Buemi for the victory. He revealed he worked hard to conserve a large amount of electrical energy, waiting for his chance to attack Buemi: "The car was so much better, I was faster than him in the second stint considering how little energy I was consuming and unfortunately a failure broke all those chances. A lot of hard work disappeared in an instant." Frijns said he was delighted to finish in a points-scoring position but felt the event was "one of the more bizarre races of my career" and was of the opinion that luck was on his side. He stated it had been a long period of time since he had scored points and his sixth-place finish was "significant" for himself and his team. Dillmann said his maiden race was "really good fun" following his battle with di Grassi and Piquet, but that he had to learn everything when the day started though he stressed it passed without any major problems: "I built up step by step. I only had a 50km test before, so that was quite tough to jump in against guys who have been racing here for three years."

The result extended Buemi's lead over di Grassi in the Drivers' Championship to 43 points, with Prost a further 29 points behind in third. Heidfeld moved to fourth place and Vergne dropped to fifth. e.Dams-Renault's strong performance allowed them to consolidate their lead in the Teams' Championship with 190 points; although neither of their cars scored points, Audi Sport ABT were still second while Mahindra's strong results strengthened their hold on third place. With Techeetah not scoring points, Virgin and NextEV moved into fourth and fifth respectively with six races left in the season. Despite the setbacks for Audi Sport ABT, the team's principal Hans-Jürgen Abt said he hoped they had used up all the bad luck and wanted to be back in contention for the season's next two races.

=== Race classification ===
Drivers who scored championship points are denoted in bold.

Final race classification
Pos.	No.	Driver	Team	Laps	Time/Retired	Grid	Points
1	**9**	**(Switzerland) Sébastien Buemi**	**e.Dams-Renault**	**49**	**59:41.125**	**1**	25+3^{2}
2	**37**	**(Argentina) José María López**	**Virgin-Citroën**	**49**	**+0.707**	**3**	18
3	**23**	**(Germany) Nick Heidfeld**	**Mahindra**	**49**	**+2.043**	**5**	15
4	**19**	**(Sweden) Felix Rosenqvist**	**Mahindra**	**49**	**+2.621**	**6**	12
5	**8**	**(France) Nico Prost**	**e.Dams-Renault**	**49**	**+3.521**	**9**	10
6	**27**	**(Netherlands) Robin Frijns**	**Andretti-BMW**	**49**	**+7.999^{4}**	**7**	8
7	**3**	**(Brazil) Nelson Piquet Jr.**	**NextEV NIO**	**49**	**+32.420**	**11**	6
8	**5**	**(France) Tom Dillmann**	**Venturi**	**49**	**+32.929**	**15**	4
9	**20**	**(New Zealand) Mitch Evans**	**Jaguar**	**49**	**+33.369**	**8**	2
10	**4**	**(France) Stéphane Sarrazin**	**Venturi**	**49**	**+34.051**	**20**	1
11	33	(Mexico) Esteban Gutiérrez	Techeetah-Renault	49	+36.091^{4}	4	
12	88	(United Kingdom) Oliver Turvey	NextEV NIO	49	+40.082^{4}	14	
13	66	(Germany) Daniel Abt	Audi Sport ABT	48	Battery	16	
14	6	(United Kingdom) Mike Conway	Dragon-Penske	48	+1 Lap	10	
15	47	(United Kingdom) Adam Carroll	Jaguar	48	+1 Lap	19	
16	**2**	**(United Kingdom) Sam Bird**	**Virgin-Citroën**	**47**	**+2 Laps**	**18**	1^{3}
Ret	11	(Brazil) Lucas di Grassi	Audi Sport ABT	38	Accident	13	
Ret	7	(Belgium) Jérôme d'Ambrosio	Dragon-Penske	35	Suspension	12	
Ret	25	(France) Jean-Éric Vergne	Techeetah-Renault	33	Steering/accident	2	
Ret	28	(Portugal) António Félix da Costa	Andretti-BMW	18	Collision	17	

Notes:

- **^2** — Three points for pole position.
- **^3** — One point for fastest lap.
- **^4** — Robin Frijns, Esteban Gutiérrez and Oliver Turvey had five seconds added to race time.

== Standings after the race ==
Drivers' Championship standings

+/–	Pos	Driver	Points
	1	(Switzerland) Sébastien Buemi	132
	2	(Brazil) Lucas di Grassi	89 (−43)
	3	(France) Nico Prost	58 (−74)
2	4	(Germany) Nick Heidfeld	47 (−91)
1	5	(France) Jean-Éric Vergne	40 (−98)

Teams' Championship standings

+/–	Pos	Team	Points
	1	(France) e.Dams-Renault	190
	2	(Germany) Audi Sport ABT	115 (−75)
	3	(India) Mahindra	87 (−103)
1	4	(United Kingdom) Virgin-Citroën	63 (−127)
1	5	(China) NextEV NIO	48 (−142)

- Notes: Only the top five positions are included for both sets of standings.

== Notes and references ==
=== References ===
Previous race: 2017 Monaco ePrix	FIA Formula E Championship; 2016–17 season	Next race: 2017 Berlin ePrix
Previous race: 2016 Paris ePrix	Paris ePrix	Next race: 2018 Paris ePrix
