= 2019 Paris ePrix =

Race 8 of 13 of the 2018–19 Formula E season
← Previous race	Next race →
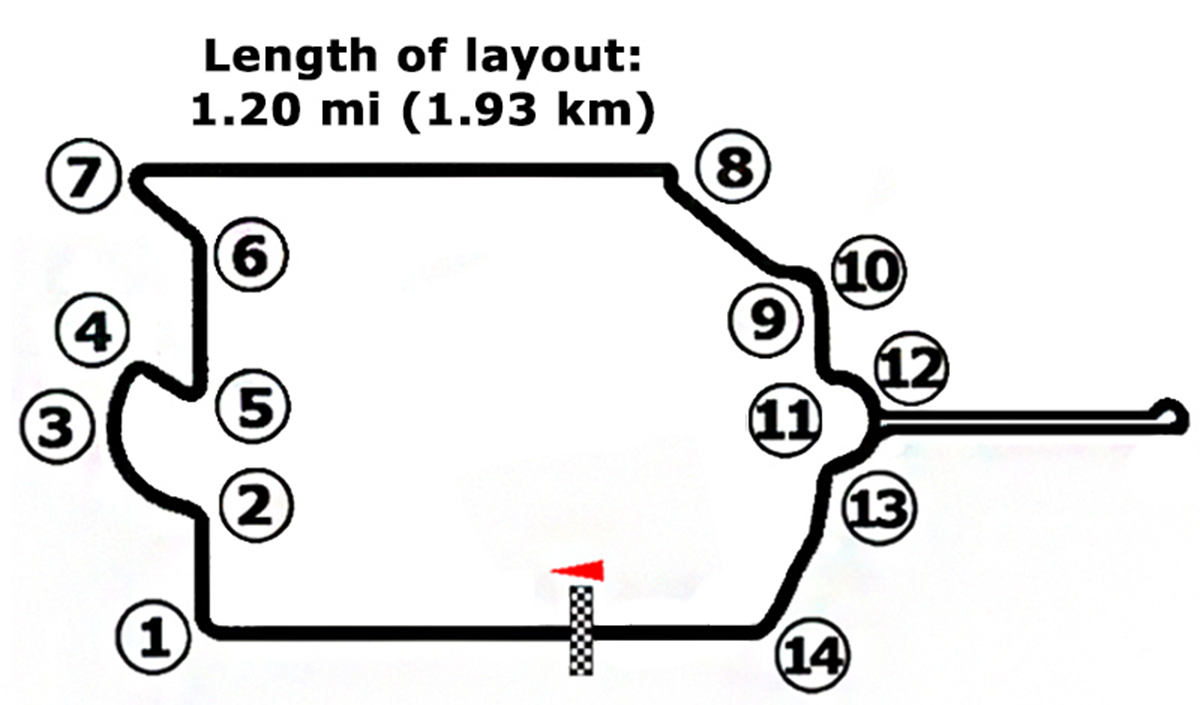
- Layout of the Paris ePrix street circuit

Race details
- Date: 27 April 2019
- Official name: 2019 Paris E-Prix
- Location: Circuit des Invalides, Les Invalides, Paris, France
- Course: Street circuit
- Course length: 1.93 km (1.20 miles)
- Distance: 32 laps, 61.440 km (38.177 miles)
- Weather: Rain

Pole position
Driver	(United Kingdom) Oliver Rowland	e.Dams-Nissan
- Time: 1:00.535

Fastest lap
Driver	(France) Tom Dillmann	NIO
- Time: 1:02.780 on lap 10

Podium
First	(Netherlands) Robin Frijns	Virgin–Audi
Second	(Germany) Andre Lotterer	Techeetah-DS
Third	(Germany) Daniel Abt	Audi

The 2019 Paris ePrix was a Formula E electric car race held at the Circuit des Invalides in the Les Invalides building complex on 27 April 2019. It was the eighth race of the 2018–19 Formula E season and the fourth and final edition of the event.

== Report ==
=== Background ===
The Paris ePrix was confirmed as part of Formula E's 2018–19 series schedule on June 7, 2018 by the FIA World Motor Sport Council. It is the eighth of thirteen scheduled single-seater electric car races of the 2018–19 season, and the fourth running of the event. The ePrix would be held at the 1.930 km (1.199 mi) clockwise fourteen-turn Circuit des Invalides in the Les Invalides building complex of the city's 7th arrondissement on 27 April 2019.

Going into the race, Mahindra driver Jérôme d'Ambrosio is leading the Drivers' Championship with 65 points, only one point ahead of BMW Andretti driver António Félix da Costa in second. In third is the Techeetah driver André Lotterer with 62 points, two points behind the championship leader after finishing second in the previous race. Jaguar driver Mitch Evans is in forth with 61 points, after winning the race in Rome. Audi Sport Abt Schaeffler driver Lucas Di Grassi stays in fifth with 58 points after finishing seventh in Rome. In the Teams' Championship, DS Techeetah led with 116 points, only seven points ahead of Virgin Racing in second place. In third place is the Mahindra Racing with 102 points; tie on points with Audi. BMW Andretti completing the top five with 82 points.

Maximilian Günther kept his Dragon Racing seat in Paris, as Felipe Nasr is focusing his preparations for the next round of the IMSA WeatherTech SportsCar Championship.

=== Practice ===
Practice 1 took part in damp conditions early in the morning. On his very first lap Lucas Di Grassi of Audi Sport got all out of shape and put the car into the wall on the out lap. He made it back to the pits but missed the rest of the session due to the damage he sustained in the crash. DS Techeetah driver Jean-Éric Vergne also lost the car early on and spun and skated of the track and down the escape road. Sébastien Buemi of Nissan e.dams collided with Virgin Racing driver Sam Bird and consequently spun, with Bird spinning into the outside wall. Many drivers going down the escape road at Turn 3 with lock ups. Robin Frijns of the Virgin Racing pushed too hard and hit the wall on the exit of Turn 3 with Sébastien Buemi spinning and following Frijns in. Then Sam Bird hit the wall in the same place as his teammate but sustained a lot more damage and was consequently out of the session and missed the second practice due to the damage. André Lotterer in the DS Techeetah was quickest after the red flag came out and brought the session to an early end.

The second practice session took part in dry conditions on the streets of Paris. Everyone left the pits as soon as possible except Sam Bird whose car was still being worked on after his heavy crash in FP1. Alex Lynn of Jaguar Racing pushed too hard and gently put the car into the wall at slow speed and, fortunately with minimal damage was able to continue. Sébastien Buemi spun and crossed the finish line backwards as he spun through the final corner. Dragon Racing driver José María López then crashed in the same place as Alex Lynn. Carrying on his form from his win in Rome last time out Mitch Evans put his Jaguar quickest of the session with a time of a 1:00.226, followed by Oliver Rowland and Lucas Di Grassi.

=== Qualifying ===
Mitch Evans brushed the wall in group 1 qualifying and took some of the wall branding off. Jérôme d'Ambrosio was the only driver who made it from group 1 to superpole. In group 2 Robin Frijns set a strong lap to book his place in super pole. Sébastien Buemi, Oliver Rowland, Pascal Wehrlein and Felipe Massa were the other 4 drivers to make it to superpole. Wehrlein took pole position from Oliver Rowland and Sébastien Buemi.

=== Race ===
The race was started behind the safety car. After the race got going, drama started when rain appeared causing mayhem. After the rain was stopped, the drivers finally got some control of their cars after the chaos and drama that’s happened during the race

=== Post-race ===
Paris ePrix was originally due to return in 2020. However, the 2020 event was cancelled due to the COVID-19 pandemic and the event was not featured since 2021.

== Classification ==
=== Qualifying ===
Pos.	No.	Driver	Team	Time	Gap	Grid
1	94	(Germany) Pascal Wehrlein	Mahindra	1:00.383	–	22^{1}
2	22	(United Kingdom) Oliver Rowland	e.Dams-Nissan	1:00.535	+0.152	1
3	23	(Switzerland) Sébastien Buemi	e.Dams-Nissan	1:00.768	+0.385	2
4	4	(Netherlands) Robin Frijns	Virgin-Audi	1:00.793	+0.410	3
5	19	(Brazil) Felipe Massa	Venturi	1:01.217	+0.834	4
6	64	(Belgium) Jérôme d'Ambrosio	Mahindra	1:01.307	+0.924	21^{1}
7	6	(Germany) Maximilian Günther	Dragon-Penske	1:00.719	–	5
8	36	(Germany) Andre Lotterer	Techeetah-DS	1:00.738	+0.019	6
9	66	(Germany) Daniel Abt	Audi	1:00.739	+0.020	7
10	11	(Brazil) Lucas di Grassi	Audi	1:00.761	+0.042	8
11	8	(France) Tom Dillmann	NIO	1:00.784	+0.065	9
12	48	(Switzerland) Edoardo Mortara	Venturi	1:00.801	+0.082	10
13	16	(United Kingdom) Oliver Turvey	NIO	1:00.876	+0.157	11
14	25	(France) Jean-Éric Vergne	Techeetah-DS	1:00.886	+0.167	12
15	2	(United Kingdom) Sam Bird	Virgin-Audi	1:00.928	+0.209	13
16	28	(Portugal) Antonio Felix da Costa	Andretti-BMW	1:00.952	+0.233	14
17	3	(United Kingdom) Alex Lynn	Jaguar	1:01.012	+0.293	15
18	27	(United Kingdom) Alexander Sims	Andretti-BMW	1:01.037	+0.318	16
19	17	(United Kingdom) Gary Paffett	HWA-Venturi	1:01.135	+0.416	17
20	20	(New Zealand) Mitch Evans	Jaguar	1:01.243	+0.524	18
21	5	(Belgium) Stoffel Vandoorne	HWA-Venturi	1:01.471	+0.752	19
22	7	(Argentina) José María López	Dragon-Penske	1:07.494	+6.775	20

Notes:

- ^1 — Pascal Wehrlein and Jérôme d'Ambrosio's lap times were deleted for tyre pressure infringement.

=== Race ===
Pos.	No.	Driver	Team	Laps	Time/Retired	Grid	Points
1	4	(Netherlands) Robin Frijns	Virgin-Audi	32	47:50.510	3	25+1^{3}
2	36	(Germany) André Lotterer	Techeetah-DS	32	+1.373	6	18
3	66	(Germany) Daniel Abt	Audi	32	+3.175	7	15
4	11	(Brazil) Lucas di Grassi	Audi	32	+3.666	8	12
5	6	(Germany) Maximilian Günther	Dragon-Penske	32	+5.456	5	10
6	25	(France) Jean-Éric Vergne	Techeetah-DS	32	+6.694	12	8
7	28	(Portugal) António Félix da Costa	Andretti-BMW	32	+7.238	14	6
8	17	(United Kingdom) Gary Paffett	HWA-Venturi	32	+7.901	17	4
9	19	(Brazil) Felipe Massa	Venturi	32	+10.522	4	2
10	94	(Germany) Pascal Wehrlein	Mahindra	32	+10.998	22	1
11	2	(United Kingdom) Sam Bird	Virgin-Audi	32	+11.488	13	
12	22	(United Kingdom) Oliver Rowland	e.Dams-Nissan	32	+19.451	1	3^{4}
13	7	(Argentina) José María López	Dragon-Penske	32	+24.023	20	
14	16	(United Kingdom) Oliver Turvey	NIO	32	+1:22.226^{1}	11	
15	23	(Switzerland) Sébastien Buemi	e.Dams-Nissan	31	+1 Lap	2	
16	20	(New Zealand) Mitch Evans	Jaguar	31	+1 Lap	18	
17	64	(Belgium) Jérôme d'Ambrosio	Mahindra	29	Accident^{2}	21	
Ret	3	(United Kingdom) Alex Lynn	Jaguar	23	Collision	15	
Ret	48	(Switzerland) Edoardo Mortara	Venturi	23	Collision	10	
Ret	27	(United Kingdom) Alexander Sims	Andretti-BMW	18	Collision	16	
Ret	5	(Belgium) Stoffel Vandoorne	HWA-Venturi	18	Suspension	19	
Ret	8	(France) Tom Dillmann	NIO	17	Accident	9	

Notes:

- ^1 — Oliver Turvey received a drive through penalty converted into a 50-second time penalty for causing a collision
- ^2 — Jérôme d'Ambrosio received 5-second time penalty for improper use of Attack Mode.
- ^3 — Fastest lap.
- ^4 — Pole position.

== Standings after the race ==
Drivers' Championship standings

+/–	Pos	Driver	Points
5	1	(Netherlands) Robin Frijns	81
1	2	(Germany) André Lotterer	80
1	3	(Portugal) António Félix da Costa	70
1	4	(Brazil) Lucas di Grassi	70
4	5	(Belgium) Jérôme d'Ambrosio	65

Teams' Championship standings

+/–	Pos	Constructor	Points
	1	(China) DS Techeetah	142
	2	(United Kingdom) Virgin-Audi	135
1	3	(Germany) Audi Sport ABT Schaeffler	129
1	4	(India) Mahindra	103
	5	(United States) BMW i Andretti Motorsport	88

- Notes: Only the top five positions are included for both sets of standings.

Previous race: 2019 Rome ePrix	FIA Formula E Championship; 2018–19 season	Next race: 2019 Monaco ePrix
Previous race: 2018 Paris ePrix	Paris ePrix	Next race: N/A; 2020 edition cancelled
