= 2017 Vegas eRace =

2017 Formula E eSports race held in Las Vegas, Nevada

Race details
| Date | January 7, 2017 | |
| Official name | 2017 Visa Vegas eRace |
| Location | The Venetian Resort Hotel Casino, Las Vegas, Nevada |
| Course | Virtual street circuit 3.14 mi (5.05 km) |
| Distance | Qualifying Race; 14 laps, 70.746 km (43.960 mi); Main Race; 20 laps, 101.000 km (62.758 mi) |
- Qualifying Race

Pole
| Driver | José María López (ARG) | Virgin |

Podium
| First | António Félix da Costa (POR) | Andretti |
| Second | José María López (ARG) | Virgin |
| Third | Robin Frijns (NED) | Andretti |
- Main Race

Pole
| Driver | Bono Huis (NED) | Dragon |
| Time | 1:28.661 |

Fastest Lap
| Driver | David Greco (ITA) | e.Dams-Renault |
| Time | 1:27.613 |

Podium
| First | Bono Huis (NED) | Dragon |
| Second | Felix Rosenqvist (SWE) | Mahindra |
| Third | Olli Pahkala (FIN) | Mahindra |

The 2017 Visa Vegas eRace was an eSports Formula E race held on January 7, 2017, at The Venetian Resort Hotel Casino in Las Vegas, Nevada, as part of the Sports Business Innovation Summit at the 2017 Consumer Electronics Show. This race, unlike others, did not count towards the 2016-17 season and was not held on a real track. Ten sim racers—competitors who typically enter simulation racing video games—raced against regular series drivers on a simulated course for a $1 million total prize fund, a record in eSports racing history. The race consisted of two races: a 14-lap qualifying race for the slowest 20 qualifiers to determine positions 11 to 20 for the 20-lap main race; and a 20-lap main race. An earlier qualifying session, divided into five groups of six cars, determined the first ten starting positions.

Bono Huis, a Dragon sim driver, led every session and won the event from pole position. António Félix da Costa, a professional driver, won the earlier qualifying race. Huis led for the majority of the race until the mandatory virtual pit stops to change into a second car, when Mahindra's Olli Pahkala took over. Pahkala finished first on the road after leading the final five laps, but he was penalised 12 seconds after it was discovered that a software bug allowed him to use FanBoost for longer than allowed. Felix Rosenqvist, the highest-placed professional driver for Mahindra, took second, while Pakhala's penalty dropped him to third.

The eRace received mixed reviews in the media. Those who criticised the race criticised its organisation because multiple technical issues caused a half-hour delay in the main event, and one driver was forced to withdraw from both races due to simulator issues. Positive reviewers expressed their belief that the event's consequences could lead to a professional eSports racing series and aid in the resolution of accessibility issues, as well as for others to use it as an alternative career to traditional motor racing. Following the eRace, some sim racers were adopted into the teams to which they were assigned, assisting their real-life development through car testing and advice.

== Background and preparations ==
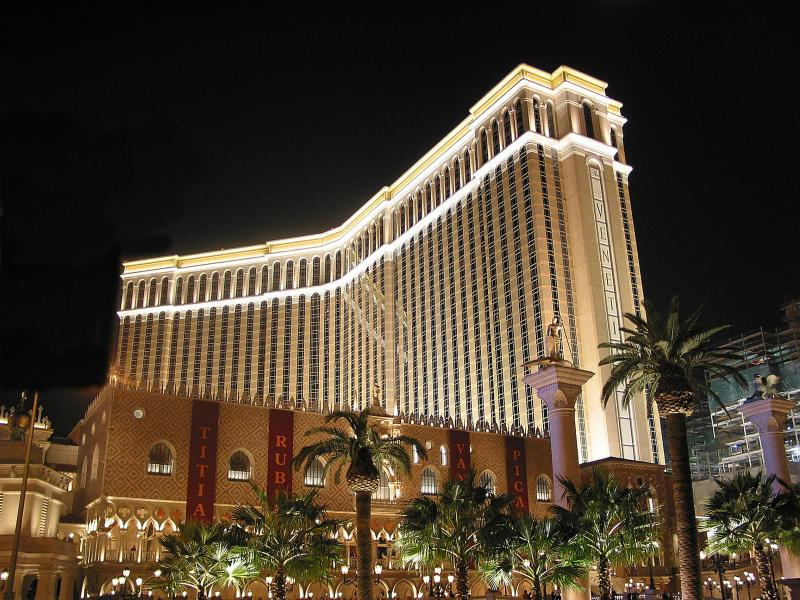
The Venetian Resort Hotel Casino, where the eRace was held

Luis Pachon, the founder of the Madrid-based start-up company Cloud Sport, proposed the idea for an eRace in Las Vegas to Formula E (FE) CEO Alejandro Agag, who quickly understood Pachon's intention and began work soon after. iRacing was reportedly an early contender for an association with FE, but the costs of laser scanning the track, and the lack of a wider benefit of putting in the effort of constructing the circuit, meant it was not cost effective.

Agag revealed the eRace plans to Reuters in June 2016, and announced that it would take place during the 2017 Consumer Electronics Show (CES). FE had previously held eRaces at all championship rounds, in which spectators competed against professional racing drivers in the eVillage of the hosting race track. The eRace was officially confirmed at the 2016 London ePrix the following month. It was held on January 7, 2017, as part of CES' Sport Business Innovation Summit at The Venetian Resort Hotel Casino, but it did not count towards the 2016–17 championship and no points were awarded. For this event, FE partnered with ELEAGUE and featured commentary from Jack Nicholls and Dario Franchitti.

The eRace featured 20 FE competitors from the regular season grid and ten sim racing drivers who qualified for the event by competing in the Road to Vegas Challenge, a four-race elimination contest held between October 16 and December 4, 2016. (Note: The four races were based on real life street circuits in Long Beach, Paris, Berlin and London.) Former Formula Ford 1600 driver Graham Carroll and iRacing world champion Greger Huttu qualified first and second for the eRace. Each of the ten sim drivers was assigned to one of the ten genuine FE teams at random. For realism, each participant wore a flame-proof race suit and drove identical virtual cars, with the only difference being team liveries and personal numbers for identification. Pit stops to virtually switch to a second car were mandatory. The race was regulated by FE's sporting director, and motorsport's world governing body, the Fédération Internationale de l'Automobile. The total prize fund was $1 million (the largest in eSports racing history), (Note: In comparison, the iRacing World Championship total prize fund is $30,000.) and was broadcast on the live streaming platform Twitch.

Cloud Sport designed the 3.14-mile (5.05 km) long anti-clockwise track, which was publicly unveiled on January 6. Drivers started on South Las Vegas Boulevard, passing hotels and casino resorts such as the Luxor and the MGM Grand. Cloud Sport supplied and regulated the Playseat simulation equipment which operated on the racing video game rFactor 2. Thrustmaster TS-PC steering wheels and T3PA pedals were fitted to the equipment. The stewards sealed and approved all computers to ensure parity. External ports were blocked to prevent anyone from connecting personal components. Drivers were unable to feel G-forces during the race, so Cloud Sport programmed the vehicles to respond to the inertia created by sudden acceleration. This created a realistic driving experience, as vehicles tilted onto three wheels during sharp cornering, and the cars' performance deteriorated when they were damaged.

The Vegas eRace was heavily promoted beforehand. Nelson Piquet Jr. of NextEV NIO, FE's inaugural champion, expressed his excitement for the eRace and stated that FE combining the simulation and real-life racing worlds was a positive step: "I think this is going to be really fun with all the drivers together." Andretti driver Robin Frijns expressed interest in how he would fare against sim drivers: "I don't really know what to expect, maybe the sim drivers or the fans are really good, maybe not, we don't know. If all you do is race on simulators at home, then maybe they are pretty good!." According to Mahindra's Felix Rosenqvist, the sim racers would have an advantage due to their experience, but it would not be as significant after learning the circuit. Audi Sport ABT team principal Hans-Jürgen Abt thought the Vegas eRace was "a good example" of how the series more progressive than other racing championships: "For more than six decades, we have been racing in motorsport on all of the world's race tracks—but this event is a total first for us."

== Practice and qualifying ==
Four practice sessions were held before the qualification race on January 7. The first session, held on January 6, lasted half an hour and was attended by sim drivers, followed by an identically timed session for professional racing drivers fifteen minutes later. On the morning of January 7, the final two sessions for sim and professional drivers each lasted fifteen minutes. Bono Huis set the fastest time for Dragon in the combined opening practice session, 1 minute, 28.456 seconds, half a second faster than anyone else. His closest rival was professional driver Rosenqvist, who finished second, ahead of third-placed Graham Carroll and Virgin's José María López in fourth. Piquet was fifth, ahead of sixth-placed António Félix da Costa. Sam Bird, Enzo Bonito, Olli Pahkala and Frijns rounded out the top ten fastest drivers in the session. Huis again led the combined time sheets in the second practice session, this time with a lap of 1 minute, 28.142 seconds, more than half a second faster than second-placed Frijns; Rosenqvist was third, Félix da Costa was fourth, Petar Brljak was fifth, and Graham Carroll was sixth. Pahkala was seventh, Bonito eighth, David Greco ninth and López tenth.

Saturday afternoon's 50 minute qualifying session was divided into five groups of six cars. The groups were determined by a lottery system and were permitted six minutes of on-track activity. The fastest five overall competitors in all five groups participated in a "Super Pole" session with one driver on the track at any time going out in reverse order from fifth to first. Each of the five drivers was limited to one timed lap and the starting order was determined by their' fastest times. (Super Pole from first to fifth, and group qualifying from sixth to tenth). Huis continued to top every session throughout the eRace meeting and achieved pole position with a lap of 1 minute, 28.631 seconds. He received a $25,000 automatic award for his achievement. Rosenqvist, whose fastest lap was two-tenths of a second slower, joined Huis on the front row. Sim racers rounded out the top ten, with Aleksi Uusi-Jaakkola third and Graham Carroll fourth. Greco finished fifth out of five super pole competitors. Sixth to tenth place went to Pahkala, Patrik Holzmann, Huttu, Bonito, and Alkesi Elomaa. Lucas di Grassi, Ma Qinghua, Bird, Maro Engel, Jean-Éric Vergne, Jérôme d'Ambrosio, Daniel Abt, Sébastien Buemi, Mitch Evans, Stéphane Sarrazin, Loïc Duval, Nico Prost, Oliver Turvey, Adam Carroll, Petar Brjlak (who crashed during his run) and Nick Heidfeld completed the starting order.

=== Qualifying race ===
From 15:25 Pacific Standard Time (PST) (UTC+08:00), the slowest 20 drivers from group qualifying competed in a 14-lap qualifying race to determine positions 11 to 20 on the grid. D'Ambrosio failed to start due to technical problems with his racing pod. In a race marred by multiple crashes that resulted in several cars losing bodywork parts, López led from the start until Félix da Costa closed in on him and overtook him on the outside at turn five. Félix da Costa led the rest of the race to finish first and start 11th in the main race. López finished second and Frijns came third. Outside the top three, Piquet secured fourth and was followed closely behind by Evans and Bird in fifth and sixth. Defending series champion Buemi took seventh ahead of di Grassi in eighth. The final two qualifiers were Di Grassi's teammate Abt and Duval in ninth and tenth.

=== Qualifying classification ===
| Pos. | No. | Driver | Team | Time | Gap | Grid |
|---|---|---|---|---|---|---|
| 1 | 67 | Bono Huis (NED) | Dragon | 1:28.661 | — | 1^{1} |
| 2 | 19 | Felix Rosenqvist (SWE) | Mahindra | 1:28.832 | +0.201 | 2^{1} |
| 3 | 26 | Aleksi Uusi-Jaakkola (FIN) | Andretti | 1:29.135 | +0.474 | 3^{1} |
| 4 | 44 | Graham Carroll (GBR) | Virgin | 1:29.243 | +0.582 | 4^{1} |
| 5 | 42 | David Greco (ITA) | e.Dams-Renault | 1:29.378 | +0.747 | 5^{1} |
| 6 | 29 | Olli Pahkala (FIN) | Mahindra | 1:29.050 | — | 6^{1} |
| 7 | 77 | Patrik Holzmann (DEU) | Audi Sport ABT | 1:29.072 | +0.022 | 7^{1} |
| 8 | 18 | Greger Huttu (FIN) | Jaguar | 1:29.117 | +0.068 | 8^{1} |
| 9 | 38 | Enzo Bonito (ITA) | Techeetah | 1:29.223 | +0.151 | 9^{1} |
| 10 | 55 | Aleksi Elomaa (FIN) | Venturi | 1:29.448 | +0.346 | 10^{1} |
| 11 | 37 | José María López (ARG) | Virgin | 1:29.490 | +0.418 | 12^{2} |
| 12 | 28 | António Félix da Costa (POR) | Andretti | 1:29.516 | +0.444 | 11^{2} |
| 13 | 27 | Robin Frijns (NED) | Andretti | 1:29.517 | +0.445 | 13^{2} |
| 14 | 3 | Nelson Piquet Jr. (BRA) | NextEV NIO | 1:29.798 | +0.726 | 14^{2} |
| 15 | 11 | Lucas di Grassi (BRA) | Audi Sport ABT | 1:30.267 | +1.195 | 18^{2} |
| 16 | 33 | Ma Qinghua (CHN) | Techeetah | 1:30.548 | +1.486 | — |
| 17 | 2 | Sam Bird (GBR) | Virgin | 1:30.620 | +1.570 | 16^{2} |
| 18 | 5 | Maro Engel (DEU) | Venturi | 1:30.647 | +1.597 | — |
| 19 | 25 | Jean-Éric Vergne (FRA) | Techeetah | 1:30.659 | +1.609 | — |
| 20 | 7 | Jérôme d'Ambrosio (BEL) | Dragon | 1:30.660 | +1.610 | — |
| 21 | 66 | Daniel Abt (DEU) | Audi Sport ABT | 1:30.781 | +1.731 | 19^{2} |
| 22 | 9 | Sébastien Buemi (CHE) | e.Dams-Renault | 1:30.905 | +1.855 | 17^{2} |
| 23 | 20 | Mitch Evans (NZL) | Jaguar | 1:30.913 | +1.863 | 15^{2} |
| 24 | 4 | Stéphane Sarrazin (FRA) | Venturi | 1:30.954 | +1.894 | — |
| 25 | 6 | Loïc Duval (FRA) | Dragon | 1:30.996 | +1.946 | 20^{2} |
| 26 | 8 | Nico Prost (FRA) | e.Dams-Renault | 1:31.331 | +2.281 | — |
| 27 | 88 | Oliver Turvey (GBR) | NextEV NIO | 1:31.533 | +2.483 | — |
| 28 | 47 | Adam Carroll (GBR) | Jaguar | 1:31.890 | +2.840 | — |
| 29 | 68 | Petar Brljak (CRO) | NextEV NIO | 1:32.400 | +3.330 | — |
| 30 | 23 | Nick Heidfeld (DEU) | Mahindra | 1:41.331 | +12.781 | — |

Notes:

- ^1 — Qualified for the main race by virtue of setting a top ten fastest qualification lap time.
- ^2 — Earned qualification into the main race by finishing within the top ten positions in the qualification race.

== Main race ==
The "Fan Boost" feature, which provided an additional 100 kW (130 hp) of power for six seconds in the driver's second car, was a unique feature of FE. A fan vote determined which three drivers were allowed to use the boost. Pakhala, López, and Greco were given the extra power for the Vegas eRace. The race was due to begin at 16:05 PST, but due to multiple technical issues, it was delayed for half an hour and reduced from 28 to 20 laps. Di Grassi failed to start due to a simulator control issue. The exact number of viewers was not disclosed. Huis maintained the lead from the standing start entering the first corner and began to expand a small lead over Rosenqvist in the opening laps, who could not maintain the leader's pace. Towards the end of lap one, Holzmann clipped the outside wall out of the final corner, speared across the start/finish straight, and collected Félix da Costa, ending both drivers' chances of a podium finish. Holzmann retired, but Félix da Costa continued despite minor car damage. Piquet dropped to 17th on the first lap, but returned to 14th by lap seven. By the third lap, Bird had moved up to sixth.

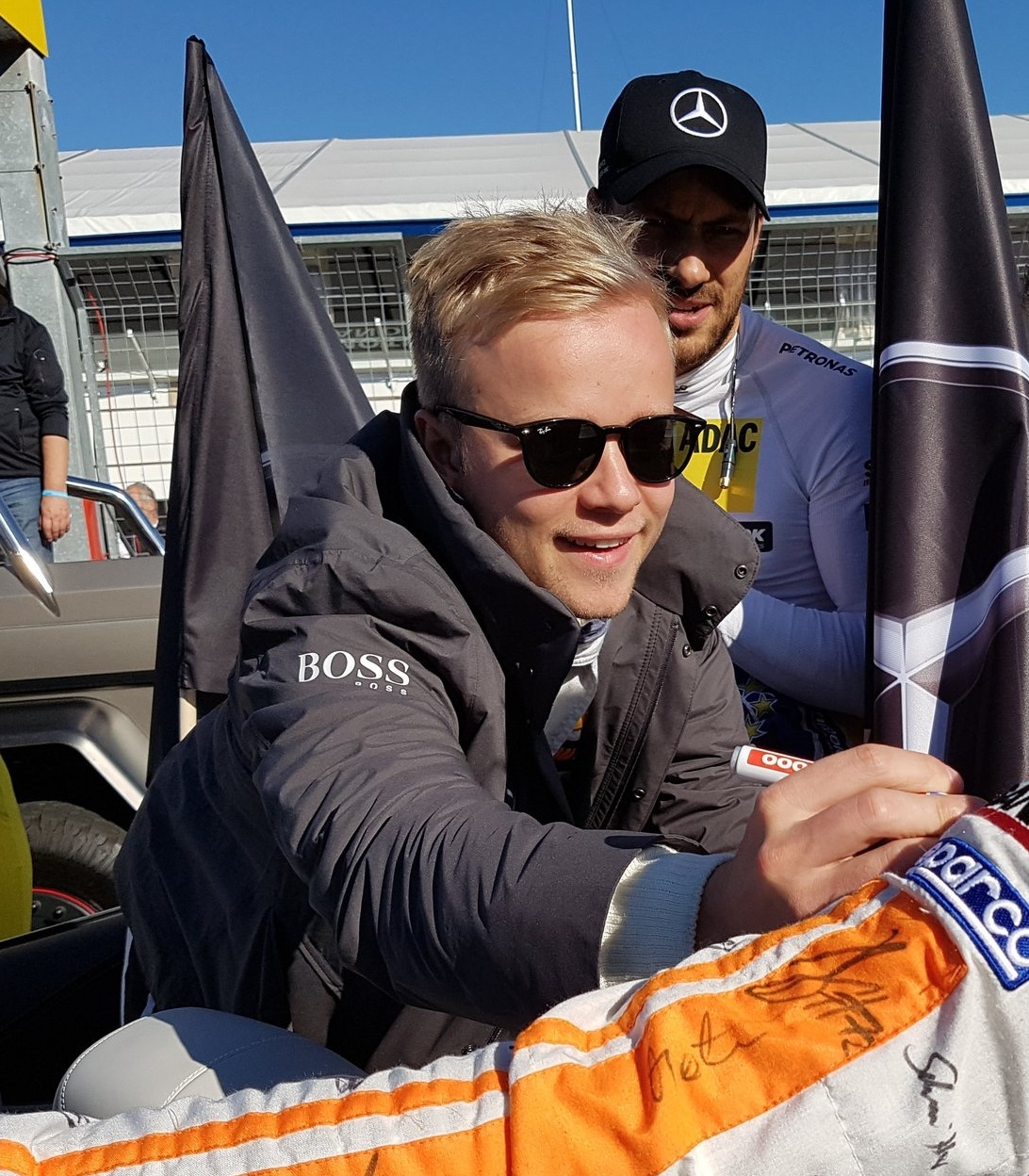
Second-placed Felix Rosenqvist (pictured in 2016) was the highest-placed professional driver to finish the eRace.

The mandatory virtual pit stops required all drivers to change cars, began at the end of lap seven, when Bird entered the pit lane. Pahkala left a multi-car battle for third with Uusi-Jaakkola, Greco, and Graham Carroll at the conclusion of the next lap in order to make his mandatory pit stop. Pahkala left with a clear track ahead of him, and because no other driver was impeding him, he set a series of fast lap times. On the tenth lap, Graham Carroll got a run on Uusi-Jaakkola leaving the final corner and steered onto the inside line into the first turn chicane. Greco made it three abreast on the outside. He and Uusi-Jaakkola collided, and the latter touched Graham Carroll's left-rear wheel. Two of the cars barrel-rolled through the trackside catch fencing and into some palm trees. The cars glitched quickly and re-rendered themselves onto the circuit. Both Uusi-Jaakkola and Greco had lost a wheel and dropped several positions. Virtual racing technology meant the trio emerged unhurt from the crash and the safety car was not used.

As the eRace progressed, race leader Huis made an error, allowing Rosenqvist to close to within less than two seconds of him. Huis and Rosenqvist made their pit stops together at the end of lap fifteen and emerged in second and third places. Pakhala lapped in the 1 minute, 24 second range, moving him to the front of the field, and requiring Huis and Rosenqvist to focus on battling for second position. Buemi dropped outside the top ten with four laps remaining when Piquet passed him for tenth. Ussi-Jaakkola and Bonito battled for fourth, which ended in the latter's favour in the last three laps. Pahkala was unchallenged for the rest of the eRace, and was first to cross the start/finish line. Huis held off Rosenqvist in the closing laps for second.

Huis and Dragon filed a complaint with the race officials following the podium ceremony. An examination of data shared by viewers on Twitter shortly after the race revealed that Pahkala had used FanBoost illegally for approximately five laps, rather than the maximum of five seconds due to a software bug. Hence, Pahkala had 12 seconds added to his race time and was demoted to third. Huis inherited the victory with Rosenqvist second. Bonito finished fourth, ahead of the Finnish duo of Uusi-Jaakkola and Huttu. The final classified finishers were López, Bird, Abt, Piquet, Buemi, Elomaa, Frijns, Duval, Greco, Félix da Costa, and Graham Carroll. Huis received $200,000 for race victory and Greco got $10,000 for setting the fastest lap.

=== Main race classification ===
| Pos. | No. | Driver | Team | Laps | Time/Retired | Grid |
|---|---|---|---|---|---|---|
| 1 | 67 | Bono Huis (NED) | Dragon | 20 | 30:54.690 | 1 |
| 2 | 19 | Felix Rosenqvist (SWE) | Mahindra | 20 | +1.330 | 2 |
| 3 | 29 | Olli Pahkala (FIN) | Mahindra | 20 | +7.000^{3} | 6 |
| 4 | 38 | Enzo Bonito (ITA) | Techeetah | 20 | +11.450 | 9 |
| 5 | 26 | Aleksi Uusi-Jaakkola (FIN) | Andretti | 20 | +16.650 | 3 |
| 6 | 18 | Greger Huttu (FIN) | Jaguar | 20 | +36.180 | 8 |
| 7 | 37 | José María López (ARG) | Virgin | 20 | +37.940 | 12 |
| 8 | 2 | Sam Bird (GBR) | Virgin | 20 | +43.910 | 15 |
| 9 | 66 | Daniel Abt (DEU) | Audi Sport ABT | 20 | +45.990 | 19 |
| 10 | 3 | Nelson Piquet Jr. (BRA) | NextEV NIO | 20 | +55.610 | 14 |
| 11 | 9 | Sébastien Buemi (CHE) | e.Dams-Renault | 20 | +59.080 | 17 |
| 12 | 55 | Aleksi Elomaa (FIN) | Venturi | 20 | +1:00.240 | 10 |
| 13 | 27 | Robin Frijns (NED) | Andretti | 19 | +1 Lap | 13 |
| 14 | 6 | Loïc Duval (FRA) | Dragon | 19 | +1 Lap | 20 |
| 15 | 38 | David Greco (ITA) | e.Dams-Renault | 19 | +1 Lap | 5 |
| 16 | 28 | António Félix da Costa (POR) | Andretti | 19 | +1 Lap | 11 |
| 17 | 44 | Graham Carroll (GBR) | Virgin | 19 | +1 Lap | 4 |
| Ret | 20 | Mitch Evans (NZL) | Jaguar | 10 | Retired | 15 |
| Ret | 77 | Patrik Holzmann (DEU) | Audi Sport ABT | 1 | Accident | 7 |
| DNS | 11 | Lucas di Grassi (BRA) | Audi Sport ABT | — | Simulator | 18 |

Notes:

- ^3 — Olli Pahkala had twelve seconds added to his race time for overusing FanBoost because of a software bug.

== Post-race ==
Huis commented on the victory: "It's very exciting to be here, racing in conjunction with pro drivers during one of the most renowned tech forward events. And to be the ultimate grand victor with Faraday Future Dragon Racing is thrilling." Second-place finisher Rosenqvist stated that, while the simulation racing environment was new to all of the professional racing drivers, he hoped to compete in future eRaces, adding: "In the end it worked out very well for me and I was up the at front in every session. Luckily, in the final I started from the front row and had a very clean race with a long first stint, without any traffic, and I was able to cruise to the podium in P2." Despite his 12-second penalty for overusing FanBoost, Pahkala remained upbeat, stating that he believed the simulation and real-world racing worlds belong together and praised the development of motor racing eSport events, adding: "In the end, P3 was more than welcome for me. It's been a blast! I made some mistakes in the practice session preparation which cost me pace later on and P3 is more than fair for everyone with what happened."

Media reaction to the Vegas eRace was mostly positive. Kyle Patrick for GTPlanet praised the quality of competitiveness across the field: "Real drivers showed they could hang with the gamers on their own turf, which can only be a good thing for both sides moving forward." The correspondent for CNN wrote Huis was widely agreed to be "a deserving overall winner", and said that the eRace had further emphasized "the narrow margins between the FE drivers and sim racers" with five professional drivers finishing in the top ten. New England Sports Network's Pat McAssey noted that FE's partnership with ELEAGUE brought sim racing to a mainstream audience and argued that eSports can potentially solve accessibility issues because some people lack the money to purchase a go-kart. He argued that FE could help eRacing grow and allow others to use it as an alternative career path to traditional motor racing. Curtis Moldrich, writing for Alphr, echoed similar sentiments, believing that the positive outcome of the Vegas eRace was a testament to FE's forward-thinking philosophy. Despite his belief that another eRace on a large scale would be unlikely, Autosport's Scott Mitchell called the event "an enormous middle finger to the traditionalists," and felt that it was "huge for a hidden part of motorsport that FE has taken that chance."

Other media outlets received the race more negatively. Luke Smith of NBC Sports wrote that Pahkala's penalty was "deeply embarrassing for all of those who looked to make the inaugural eRace such a success" and likened it to "Balance of Performance on steroids." He went on to say that the event did not go as smoothly as organisers had hoped, and that there was some scepticism about FE attempting to bridge the gap between the real-life and simulation worlds because the former relies on sensory input. The Checkered Flag's Scott Douglas was more critical, writing that as a competition, the race was "a disappointment" since sim racers were expected to dominate, and its problems hurt the finishing order's credibility: "This undermined the race as a competition, and also did nothing to help the reputation of FE itself as its best drivers were so resoundingly beaten. It lacked any sense of real weight or drama, and tied in with the glitches affecting some of the drivers it didn't come anywhere near to producing the excitement of real racing." Jonathan M. Gitlin of Ars Technica felt short-changed watching the eRace and noted the large number of complaints about the quality of the graphics in the Twitch stream.

== Legacy ==
Following the event, some of the competing sim racers were adopted into their respective teams and assisted in the real-life development of their cars through testing and advising, indicating that their opinions were taken seriously, according to FE's eSports manager Matt Huxley.
