= 2018 Paris ePrix =

Race 8 of 12 of the 2017–18 Formula E Championship
← Previous race	Next race →
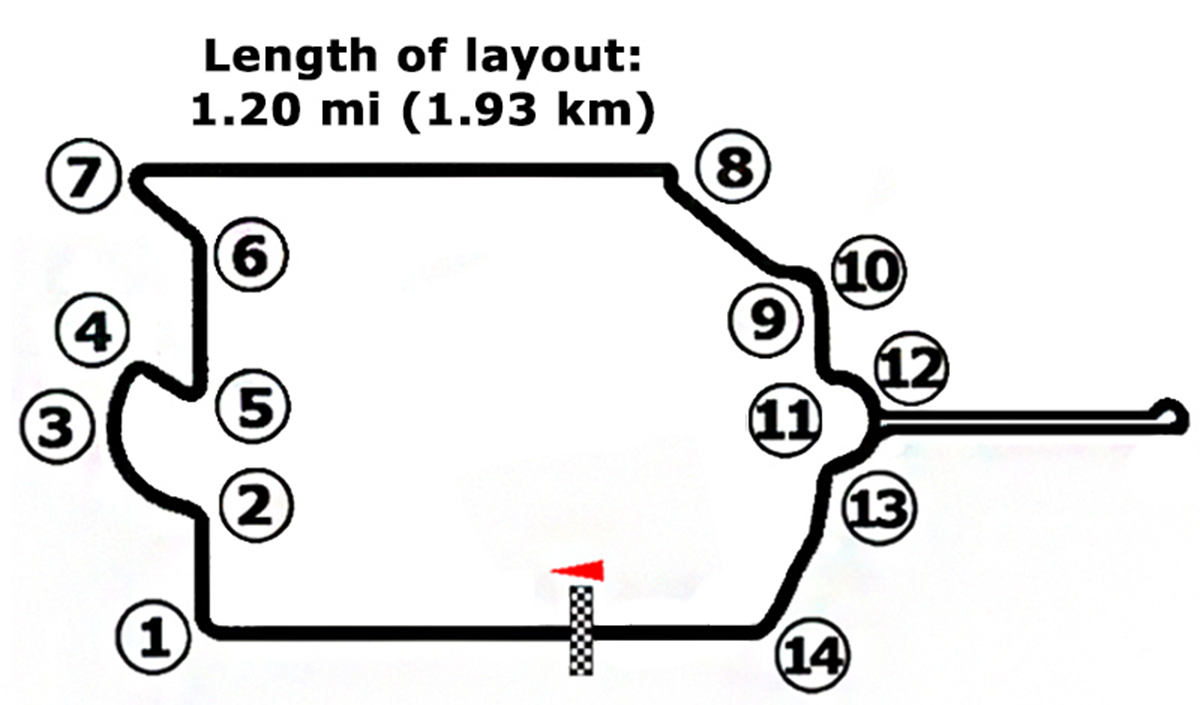
- Layout of the Paris Formula E street circuit

Race details
- Date: 28 April 2018
- Official name: 2018 Qatar Airways Paris E-Prix
- Location: Circuit des Invalides, Les Invalides, Paris, France
- Course: Street circuit
- Course length: 1.93 km (1.20 miles)
- Distance: 49 laps, 94.598 km (58.781 miles)
- Weather: Sunny
- Attendance: 48,000

Pole position
Driver	(France) Jean-Éric Vergne	Techeetah-Renault
- Time: 1:01.444

Fastest lap
Driver	(Brazil) Lucas di Grassi	Audi
- Time: 1:02.367 on lap 34

Podium
First	(France) Jean-Éric Vergne	Techeetah-Renault
Second	(Brazil) Lucas di Grassi	Audi
Third	(United Kingdom) Sam Bird	Virgin-Citroën

The 2018 Paris ePrix (formally the 2018 Qatar Airways Paris E-Prix) was a Formula E electric car race held before a crowd of 48,000 spectators at the Circuit des Invalides in the Les Invalides building complex on 28 April 2018. It was the eighth race of the 2017–18 Formula E Championship and the third Paris ePrix. The 49-lap race was won by Techeetah driver Jean-Éric Vergne from pole position. Audi's Lucas di Grassi finished second and Virgin driver Sam Bird was third.

Vergne won the pole position by recording the fastest lap in qualifying and maintained the lead for the next 23 laps as Bird had more electrical energy available. This allowed Bird to shorten Vergne's lead and unsuccessfully tried to overtake him. Through the pit stop phase to get into a second car, di Grassi took the lead for two laps after conserving electrical energy. Edoardo Mortara led the following lap before Vergne retook the position after the pit stops. Vergne was unchallenged for the final third of the race and took his third victory of the season after his teammate André Lotterer battled Bird and di Grassi.

The consequence of the race extended Vergne's Drivers' Championship lead over Bird to 31 points and Felix Rosenqvist kept third despite placing eighth. Sébastien Buemi kept fourth position while di Grassi moved him from eighth to fifth. In the Teams' Championship, Techeetah increased their advantage over Virgin from 34 to 55 points. Audi overtook Mahindra for third with four races left in the season.

== Background ==
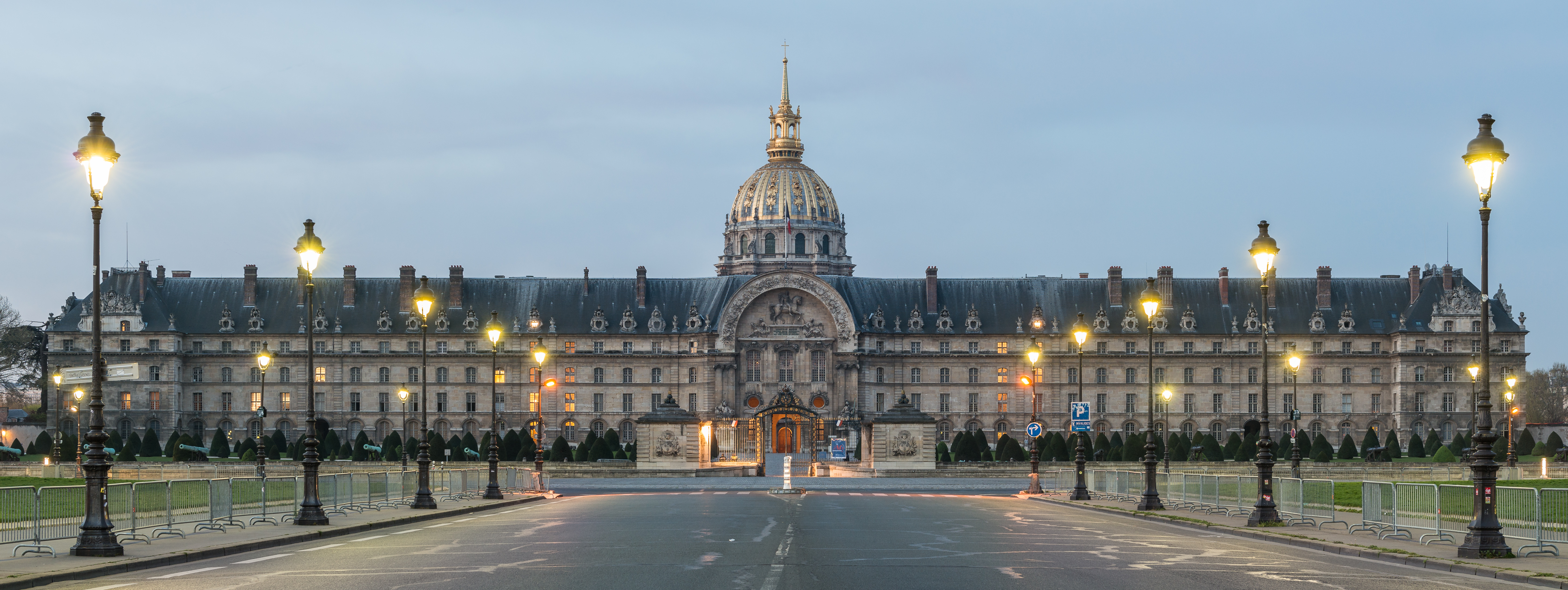
The Esplanade des Invalides, where the track's pit lane was located.

The 2018 Paris ePrix was confirmed as part of Formula E's 2017–18 schedule in September 2017 by the FIA World Motor Sport Council. It was the eighth of twelve scheduled single-seater electric car races of the 2017–18 Championship, and the third edition of the event. The ePrix was held at the 14-turn 1.930 km (1.199 mi) clockwise Circuit des Invalides in the Les Invalides building complex of the city's 7th arrondissement on 28 April 2018. It was switched from May to April because organisers wanted less traffic in the area owing to the 2017 race being held outside the French school holidays. Construction of the circuit took around six days with workers using 5,000 t (5,000,000 kg) of material shipped to the Port Gros-Caillou. Additionally, 1.5 km (0.93 mi) of road was resurfaced to make it smoother. Organisers of the race expected around 50,000 people in attendance.

Going into the race, Techeetah driver Jean-Éric Vergne led the Drivers' Championship with 119 points. Sam Bird of Virgin followed in second place with 101 points and Mahindra's Felix Rosenqvist was third with 82 points. Sébastien Buemi of the e.Dams-Renault team was fourth with 60 points and Audi driver Daniel Abt was fifth with 50 points scored. Techeetah led the Teams' Championship with 152 points; Virgin were second with 118 points and Mahindra were 15 points behind in third. Audi in fourth and Jaguar in fifth were separated by one point.

Bird had won the preceding Rome ePrix two weeks prior and narrowed Vergne's championship lead to 18 points. He spoke of his team's belief they were closer than they had been in the title contest and aimed to capitalise on their current situation, adding that "I won last time out so I'm feeling good. It's getting to crunch time now in the championship and thankfully I'm there and fighting for the world title this year." Vergne did not finish the 2017 event due to a suspension failure and spent a week testing in Techeetah's simulator with his mechanics and looked forward to driving in Paris, saying that "Having grown up in Paris, this race is extra special for me. I'm really looking forward to racing now and to meet all the French fans that have been an incredible support so far this season." Lucas di Grassi (Audi), the 2016 Paris ePrix winner, was stimulated to keep getting podium finishes and took a plethora of momentum from Rome, adding that "Now we need to perfectly nail everything down."

A total of 20 drivers represented ten squads of two drivers each for the ePrix. There was one change of driver heading into the event. Having been in one of the NIO cars since the season-opening Hong Kong ePrix double header, Luca Filippi was dropped for the race and replaced by the team's reserve and simulation driver Ma Qinghua. The change was necessitated following Filippi's poor performances over the season compared to teammate Oliver Turvey and the lack of significant results and internal pressure was applied to allow a Chinese driver to race once during the campaign. This caused Ma to miss the FIA World Rallycross Championship round at Montalegre.

== Practice ==
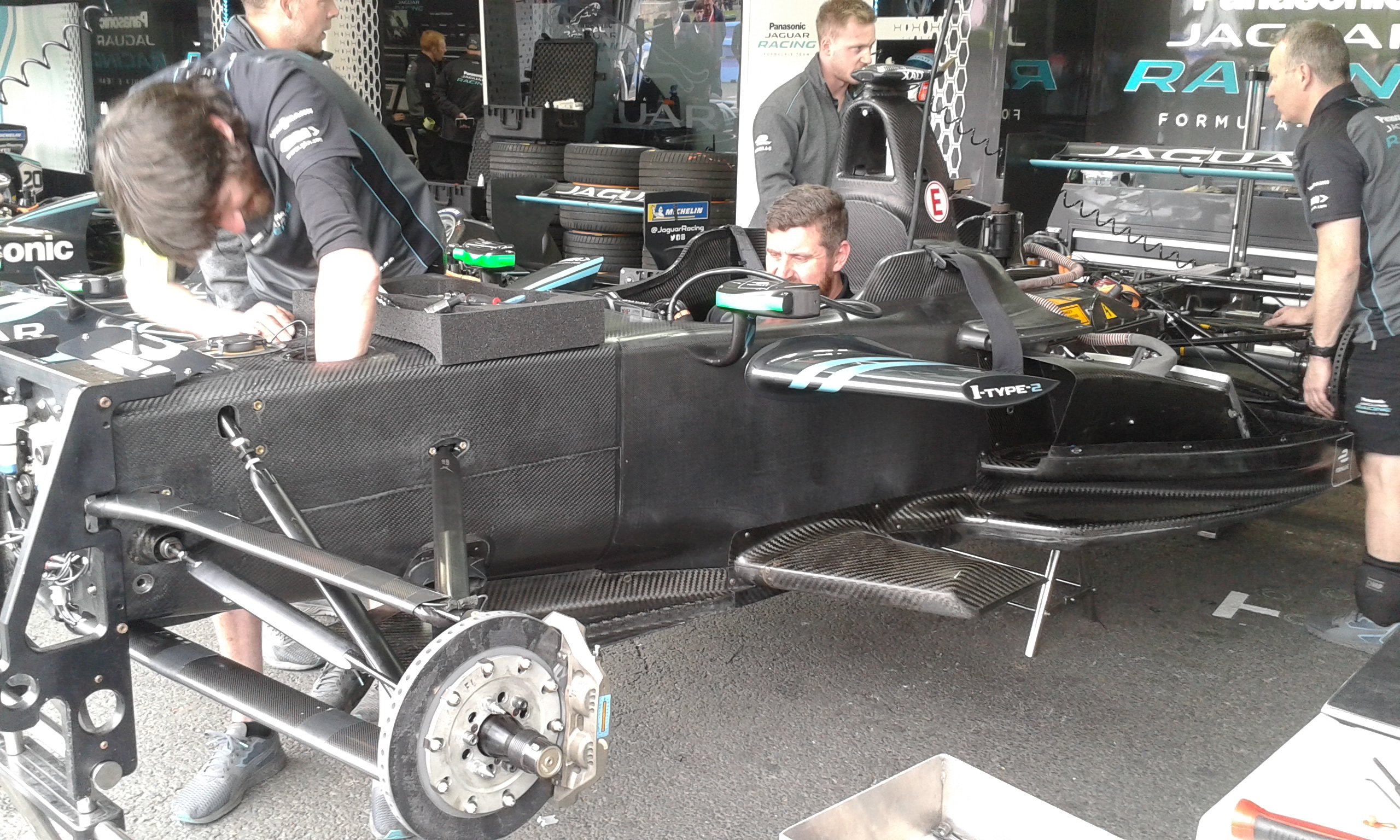
The car of Nelson Piquet Jr. being repaired after his crash during free practice. He also damaged his second vehicle, stopping him from driving in the qualifying session.

Two practice sessions—both on Saturday morning—were held before the late afternoon race. The first session ran for 45 minutes and the second lasted half an hour. An untimed half hour shakedown session was held late Friday afternoon to allow teams to check the reliability of their cars and electronic systems. Bird set the fastest lap late in the first practice session at 1 minute, 1.698 seconds, followed by di Grassi, Abt, Mitch Evans (Jaguar), Vergne, Alex Lynn (Virgin), José María López (Dragon), António Félix da Costa (Andretti), Jérôme d'Ambrosio (Dragon) and André Lotterer (Techeetah). Two red flags were necessitated in a session where several drivers went off the track: Nelson Piquet Jr. (Jaguar) lost control of his car heading onto the start/finish straight, and deranged his front-right suspension by striking the turn 14 barrier 15 minutes in. Though Piquet was unhurt, the session was stopped for ten minutes and the safety car returned him to the pit lane as his car was moved. The second stoppage came with 15 minutes left when Rosenqvist struck the kerb at turn 12, and lost control of his vehicle's rear by going airborne. He oversteered into an outside exit wall and broke his front-left suspension. Di Grassi used 200 kW (270 hp) of power to set the fastest lap at the end of second practice at 1 minute, 0.881 seconds, a tenth of a second ahead of Vergne. Positions three through ten were filled by Evans, Rosenqvist, Abt, Turvey, Bird, Piquet, Buemi and Lotterer. Though the session passed relatively smoothly, Piquet crashed for a second time by locking his tyres, losing control of his second car, and bent his front-left tyre in a collision at the long-right turn five barrier, stopping the session for about five minutes.

== Qualifying ==
Saturday's afternoon qualifying session ran for an hour and was divided into four groups of five cars. Each group was determined by a lottery system and was permitted six minutes of on-track activity. All drivers were limited to two timed laps with one at maximum power. The fastest five overall competitors in the four groups participated in a "Super Pole" session with one driver on the track at any time going out in reverse order from fifth to first. Each of the five drivers was limited to one timed lap and the starting order for the ePrix was determined by the competitor's fastest times (Super Pole from first to fifth, and group qualifying from sixth to twentieth). The driver and team who recorded the fastest time were awarded three points towards their respective championships.

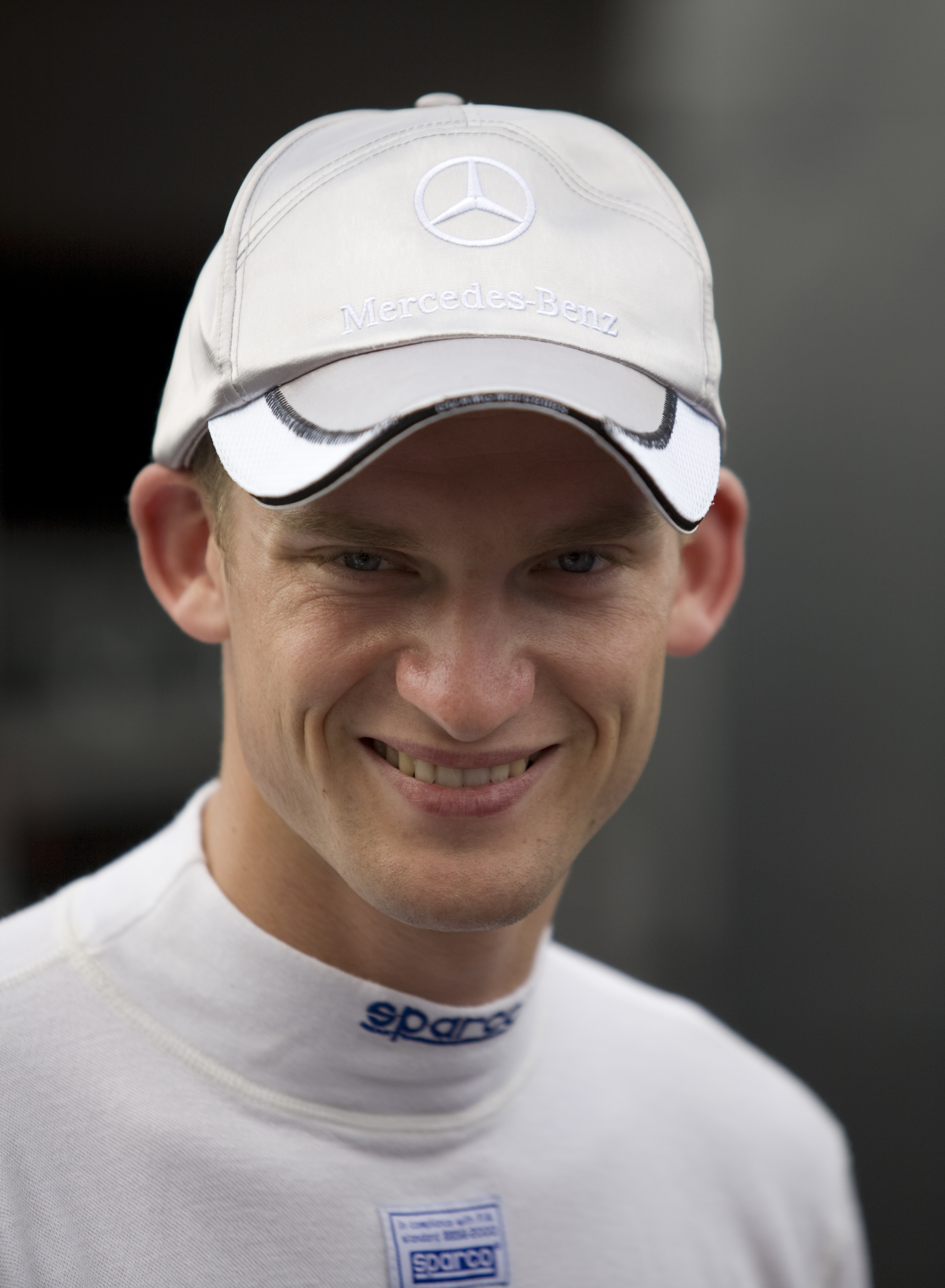
Maro Engel (pictured in 2009) qualified fourth in his second career appearance in super pole.

In the first group of five competitors, which had nobody venture onto the dusty track until midway through the session, Vergne set the fastest lap time of any driver in group qualifying at 1 minute, 1.508 seconds. Bird was close behind in second with Buemi third. Rosenqvist and Abt had weak attempts that left him more than half a second slower than Vergne and completed the first group's drivers. Lotterer led the second group in which traffic was expected to impede others less often and the track conditions were expected to improve but this proved not to be the case due to dust and debris accumulation. Second to fourth places were taken by di Grassi, Turvey and Evans. Piquet did not partake in qualifying because his two cars were being re-built after his two crashes in practice. Jaguar contravened series regulations which obliges teams to send their cars to parc fermé five minutes before qualifying. The stewards later granted Piquet dispensation to start the ePrix. In group three, Félix da Costa was fastest by setting a quick second sector and was followed by López in second. Nick Heidfeld (Mahindra) delayed his lap for as long as possible but he lost time in the final third of a lap and came third. Lynn and Edoardo Mortara (Venturi) struggled on the bumpy track and were the third group's slowest two competitors.

All five drivers of the fourth group ventured onto the track as soon as it commenced and had Maro Engel (Venturi) record the fastest lap in spite his first two sector times being off the pace of the fastest overall runners and stopped di Grassi from entering super pole. D'Ambrosio out-qualified teammate López for the first time in the season and was second-quickest in group four. Tom Blomqvist (Andretti), Nico Prost (e.Dams-Renault) and Ma were group four's slowest three drivers. At the end of the group stages, Vergne, Félix da Costa, Engel, Bird and Lotterer's lap times progressed them to super pole. Vergne (fined €1,000 for pit lane over-speeding during qualifying) was the last driver to set a lap and recorded overall best times to earn his fourth pole position of the season with a 1-minute, 1.144 seconds lap. He was joined on the grid's front row by Bird who held the pole until Vergne's lap in spite of glancing a wall on his try. Lotterer attained his highest qualifying start in Formula E at the time with third after locking his tyres entering turn three. In his second super pole appearance, Engel also had his best career qualifying effort in fourth after losing momentum in the final sector. Fifth-placed Félix da Costa locked his tyres and ran wide at the exit of the third corner to not be in contention for pole position. After qualifying, Evans changed the gearbox in one of his cars and dropped ten places because he had taken up his "joker" change in Punta del Este. However, he could not serve the full penalty and was penalised five seconds during the mandatory change into his second car. Mortara incurred a three-place grid penalty for exceeding the 50 km/h (31 mph) speed limit under red flag conditions in the second practice session. The rest of the grid lined up after penalties as di Grassi, d'Ambrosio, Buemi, Turvey, López, Rosenqvist, Heidfeld, Prost, Abt, Lynn, Blomqvist, Ma, Piquet, Mortara and Evans.

=== Qualifying classification ===
Final qualifying classification
Pos.	No.	Driver	Team	GS	SP	Grid
1	25	(France) Jean-Éric Vergne	Techeetah-Renault	1:01.508	1:01.144	1
2	2	(United Kingdom) Sam Bird	Virgin-Citroën	1:01.771	1:01.421	2
3	18	(Germany) André Lotterer	Techeetah-Renault	1:01.818	1:01.487	3
4	5	(Germany) Maro Engel	Venturi	1:01.756	1:01.541	4
5	28	(Portugal) António Félix da Costa	Andretti-BMW	1:01.563	1:02.805	5
6	1	(Brazil) Lucas di Grassi	Audi	1:01.823	—N/a	6
7	7	(Belgium) Jérôme d'Ambrosio	Dragon-Penske	1:01.836	—N/a	7
8	9	(Switzerland) Sébastien Buemi	e.Dams-Renault	1:01.837	—N/a	8
9	16	(United Kingdom) Oliver Turvey	NIO	1:01.888	—N/a	9
10	6	(Argentina) José María López	Dragon-Penske	1:01.902	—N/a	10
11	19	(Sweden) Felix Rosenqvist	Mahindra	1:02.012	—N/a	11
12	23	(Germany) Nick Heidfeld	Mahindra	1:02.058	—N/a	12
13	8	(France) Nico Prost	e.Dams-Renault	1:02.092	—N/a	13
14	20	(New Zealand) Mitch Evans	Jaguar	1:02.122	—N/a	20^{1}
15	66	(Germany) Daniel Abt	Audi	1:02.125	—N/a	14
16	36	(United Kingdom) Alex Lynn	Virgin-Citroën	1:02.139	—N/a	15
17	27	(United Kingdom) Tom Blomqvist	Andretti-BMW	1:02.823	—N/a	16
18	4	(Switzerland) Edoardo Mortara	Venturi	1:02.834	—N/a	19^{2}
19	68	(China) Ma Qinghua	NIO	1:02.998	—N/a	17
20	3	(Brazil) Nelson Piquet Jr.	Jaguar	—	—N/a	18

Notes:

- ^1— Mitch Evans dropped ten places for changing his gearbox in one of his cars.
- ^2— Edoardo Mortara was demoted three positions for speeding under red flag conditions during second practice.

== Race ==
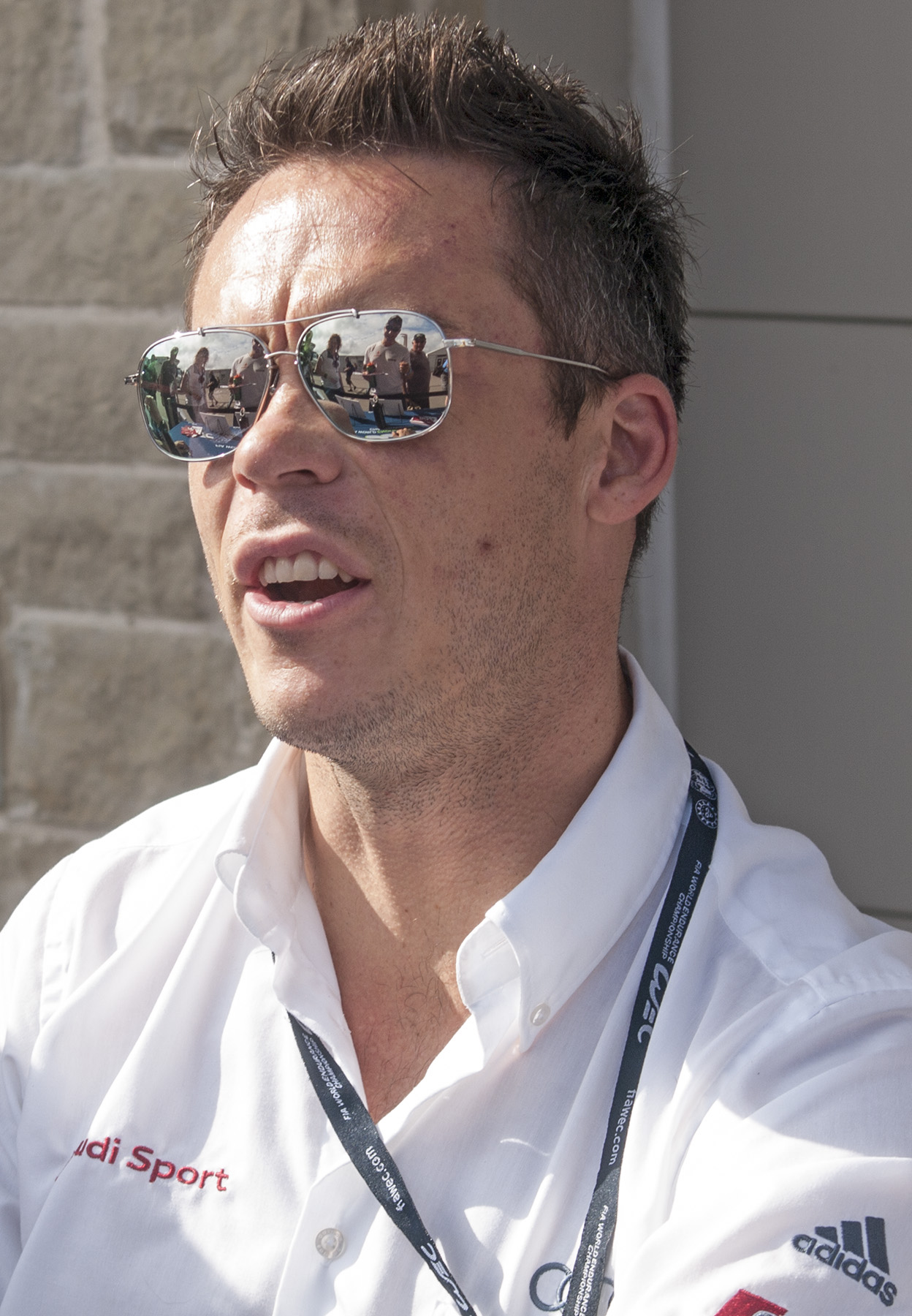
André Lotterer (pictured in 2014) ran at the front of the field for the duration of the race before dropping to sixth due to electrical energy over-usage and car damage.

The weather at the start was dry but cloudy with the air temperature between 15.55 and 15.84 °C (59.99 and 60.51 °F) and the track temperature from 22.75 to 23.35 °C (72.95 to 74.03 °F). A special feature of Formula E is the "Fan Boost" feature, an additional 100 kW (130 hp) of power to use in the driver's second car. The three drivers who were allowed to use the boost were determined by a fan vote. For the Paris race, Abt, Buemi and di Grassi were handed the extra power. When the race began before a crowd of 48,000 at 16:03 Central European Summer Time (UTC+02:00), Vergne maintained the lead driving into the opening corner. Lotterer made a brisk start to pass Bird but the latter regained second position as the two avoided an accident. Further back, di Grassi passed Félix da Costa for fifth as the latter was slow off the grid and fell to seventh. D'Ambrosio similarly had an unclean first lap and switched positions with his fast-starting teammate López. A problem with Ma's inverter meant he moved just a few metres off his starting slot and went several laps down on the leader.

At the turn nine hairpin, Evans attempted to pass Blomqvist with an aggressive manoeuvre and ended up ramming the back of Blomqvist's car. The resulting concertina effect caused Blomqvist to mount the rear of Prost's vehicle. The damage to Evans and Blomqvist's cars led them to enter the pit lane for repairs and dropped them to the rear of the field. The consequence of Ma's stationary car and the Evans, Blomqvist and Prost incident led the race director to activate the full course yellow procedure to allow marshals to clear debris. Racing resumed on the second lap with Vergne leading. On that lap, Félix da Costa locked his brakes due to a software glitch that switched off his car when he applied his brakes and drove onto the turn eight run-off area. He later returned to the pit lane to retire. Abt passed d'Ambrosio by braking later than him on the outside into turn one for tenth on lap four. At the front, Vergne, Bird and Lotterer opened up a small gap over Engel in fourth who was pressured by di Grassi and Buemi who conserved electrical energy.

Abt overtook Rosenqvist on the outside for ninth at the start of lap eight and passed López in the same area but on the inside the next lap. On lap 13, the black flags with an orange disc were waved for Prost, ordering him to enter the pit lane and replace his front wing because the one mounted on his car was damaged by Blomqvist in the first lap accident. Abt overtook Turvey for seventh on lap 16. Bird had slightly more usable electrical energy than race leader Vergne, allowing him to shorten the latter's advantage and replicate a duel from 2016 at the same track. Lotterer joined the battle soon after as he set at that point the race's fastest lap at 1 minute, 3.073 seconds. However, on lap 22, Lotterer lost a small amount of time to Bird when he locked his tyres into turn eight. Lotterer narrowly avoided glancing the wall but later caught back up. With electrical energy running low on the next lap, Bird tried again to pass Vergne by braking later than him on the right entering turn one but locked his front tyres and turned back onto the racing line.

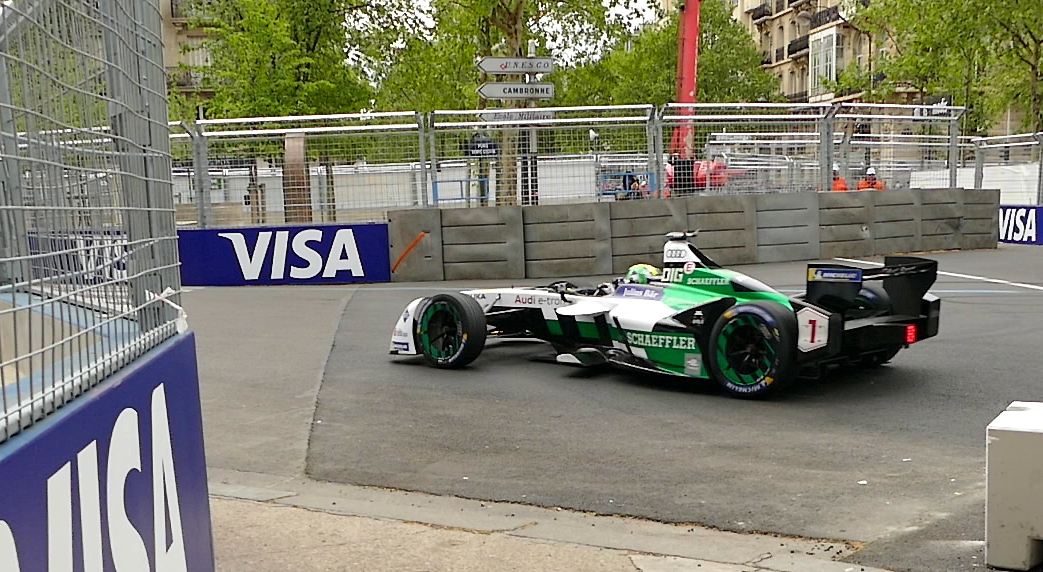
Lucas di Grassi conserved electrical energy in the first half of the race and finished second after a fast pit stop and gaining the advantage of a battle within the top three.

Vergne, Bird and Lotterer were separated by half a second when they made their mandatory pit stops to change into a second car at the end of lap 24. Di Grassi and Buemi's strategy allowed the duo to complete two more laps in first and second. Rosenqvist made a prior pit stop and was being lapped by the top two but did not yield to di Grassi, allowing Buemi to close up but could not overtake him. Mortara led for one lap after conserving the most electrical energy out of any driver as he sought to gain positions after his qualifying performance. After the pit stops, Vergne retained first place and extended his lead over Bird by more than a second. Lotterer remained in third despite his pit stop lasting two seconds longer. Di Grassi demoted Engel to fifth by having a faster pit stop and he held off Engel upon rejoining the circuit. Abt began to duel Buemi for sixth on lap 30. Rosenqvist took ninth from López by moving between him and the turn ten inside wall on that lap. Rosenqvist braked later than Turvey and took eighth from him on the outside at turn one.

Meanwhile, di Grassi's electrical energy advantage allowed him to pull away from Engel whom Buemi and Abt battled with and recorded the race's fastest lap on lap 34 of 1 minute, 2.367 seconds to earn one point. On lap 35, Lotterer had drawn close enough to Bird to affect an overtake on him. Lotterer turned left and passed Bird entering turn ten but locked his tyres midway through by missing his braking point. The two collided since Bird's path was blocked. Lotterer sustained rear wing damage but continued. This allowed di Grassi to close up and overtake Bird on the inside entering turn one the lap after. Entering the final ten laps, most drivers had 40 per cent of electrical energy available which meant everyone had to use 4 per cent for the rest of the race due to the short length of the track but the possibility of some not reaching the end increased as Bird had just 22 per cent left with six laps to go. On lap 41, a short yellow flag phase was prompted when López hit Mortara at turn ten and the latter drifted into a barrier but reversed to continue driving. Abt used his FanBoost to overtake Buemi on the inside into turn one for sixth three laps later and then unsuccessfully attempted to pass Engel.

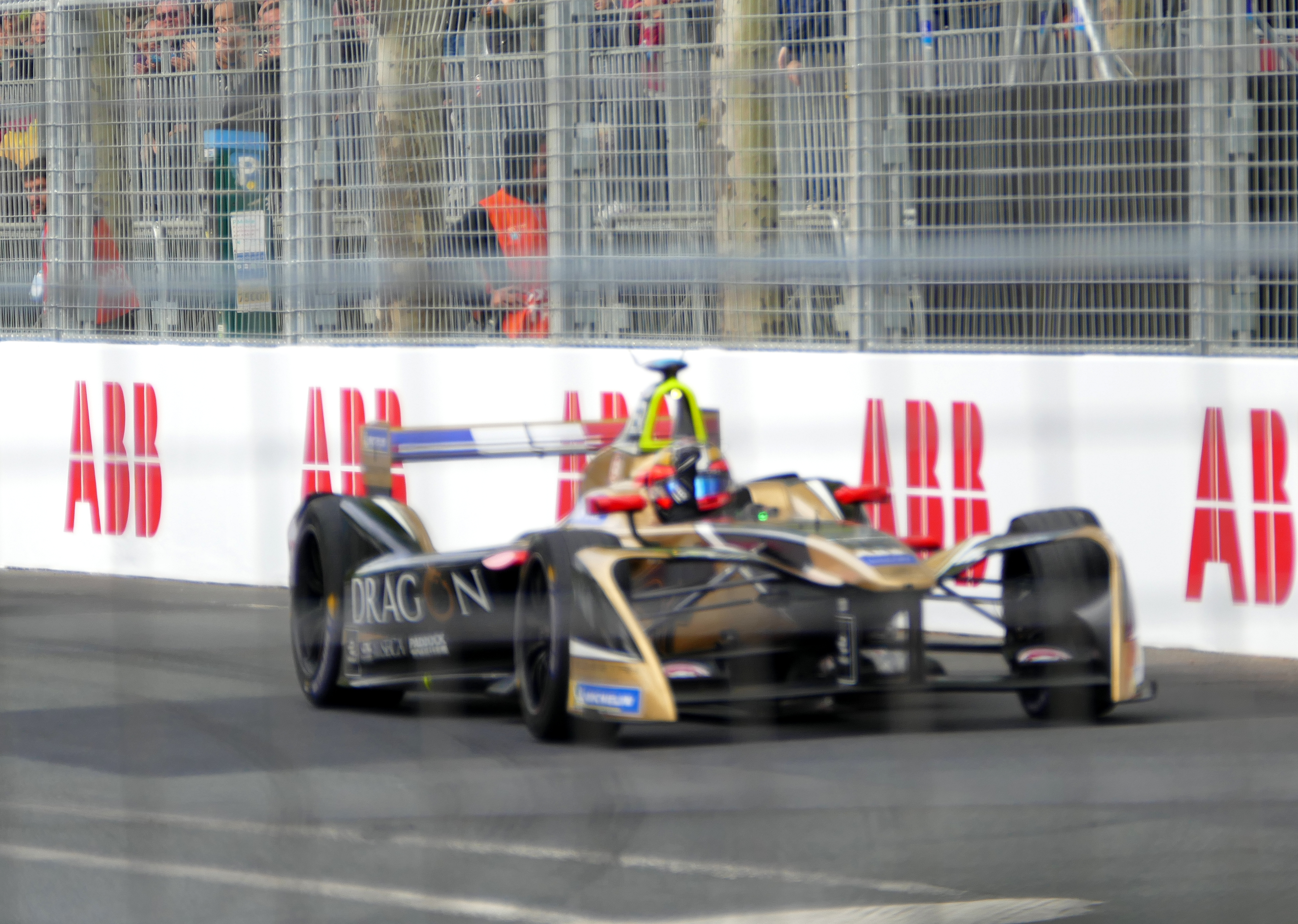
Jean-Éric Vergne started from pole position and led for the majority of the ePrix to clinch his third win of the season.

Lotterer and di Grassi drew closer to race leader Vergne as they distanced fourth-placed Bird in the closing laps. Di Grassi came close to passing Lotterer through turns eight and nine on lap 46 and the manner of Lotterer's defensive manoeuvres drew an angry response from di Grassi over the radio and both drivers lost momentum. On the final lap, Abt lost fifth to Buemi at the turn nine chicane in a manoeuvre that damaged Abt's sidepod and the latter narrowly avoided going into a wall. Abt stopped, steered 360 degrees and re-accelerated. This left him without enough electrical energy to cross the finish line at full racing speed and his car shut down. Unchallenged in the final third of the race, Vergne extended his lead to almost five seconds and slowed across the line with a small amount of electrical energy for his third victory of the season. Meanwhile, Lotterer ran out of electrical energy at turn nine and di Grassi took second from him. Bird sought a way past the slow Lotterer but he could not do so due to the tight circuit and rammed into the rear of his car. The crash littered debris on the track, damaging Bird's front-left wheel, but took third while Lotterer's rear wing was cracked. Engel took his best career finish in fourth and positions five to ten were taken by Buemi, Lotterer, Abt. Rosenqvist, Turvey and López. Heidfeld, d'Ambrosio, Mortara, Lynn, Evans, Prost and Ma were the final classified finishers. Piquet was the only other retirement when he stopped with a loose seat belt on lap 32.

=== Post-race ===
The top three drivers appeared on the podium to collect their trophies and spoke to the media in a later press conference. Vergne declared his victory as the "most emotional" of his career up to that point, "I can't find words, It's an incredible feeling, by far my best victory. If there was a race I wanted to win this year it was clearly Paris". He reserved praise for his team, thanked them for their work over the weekend and affirmed they would continue to work hard for the rest of the season. Second-placed di Grassi spoke of his happiness at another podium and maintaining his record of scoring points after repairs were made to his car to improve its reliability, "I had another good run today. It was a shame about qualifying, as I missed super pole by five-thousandths of a second and it was super tight." Bird complimented Vergne on the way he ran the race but stated his feeling he was sometimes being put into Lotterer's path, "If he could use him, I'm sure he would've liked to have used him to create a buffer as he is fighting me for the title currently."

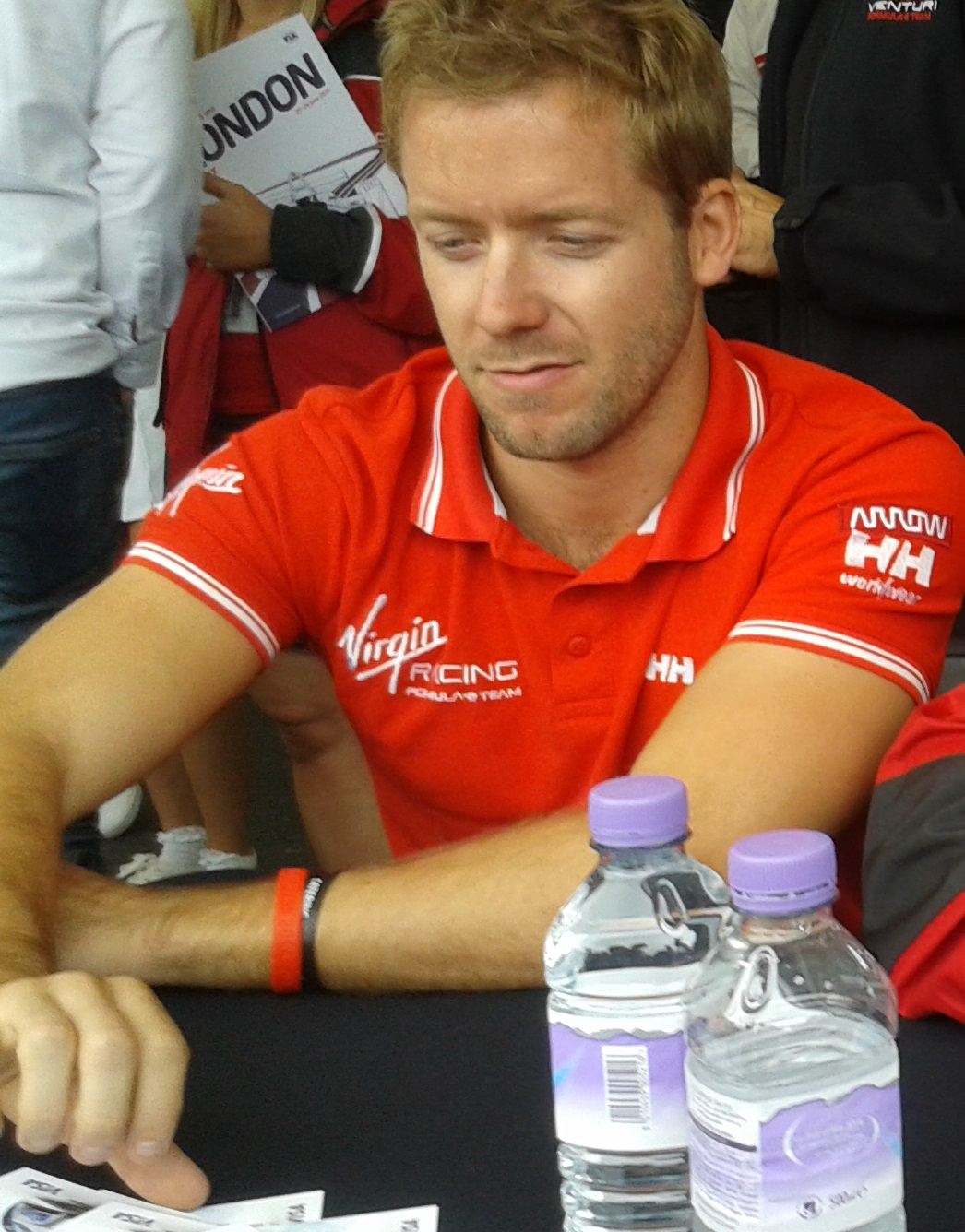
Second-placed Sam Bird (pictured in 2015) was vocal in his criticism of Lotterer's driving and disclosed that racing standards were discussed prior the race.

The stewards deemed Lotterer to have caused the final lap collision with Bird and imposed a ten-place grid penalty on him for the Berlin ePrix but did not penalise him for the lap 35 contact with the latter. Bird was vocal in his criticism of Lotterer, telling the press the issue of moving under braking was discussed in the pre-race drivers briefing, and called for the consistent application of penalties, "That is not correct in any form of motorsport and I believe what we saw today was not correct. I had a bit of it in Punta [del Este] and it's too aggressive." Di Grassi said he saw no logic of Lotterer impeding him once his energy had been depleted and warned that such manoeuvres could become common in Formula E. He agreed with Bird's view and wanted the enforcement of improved competitor etiquette and urged the series' governing body, the Fédération Internationale de l'Automobile, to impose harsher penalties on those deemed to have inadequate driving standards. Lotterer dismissed the criticism towards him and targeted di Grassi in his comments, "I don't know, I was just racing. I don't know what he was complaining about. He actually drove into me twice in this race. I don't care what he says"

Engel scored eleven points prior to the Paris ePrix and stated his career-best fourth-place finish gave him the confidence to aim for the podium at Berlin, "We've always said that if we have a car that enables us to regularly be in top ten, and on good days, when everything comes together, we can fight for the top five, maybe even get on the podium. We had a good day in Paris. We were so close to the podium but we can be happy with P4." Audi team principal Allan McNish revealed Abt declared his intention to overcome the narrow circuit in the team's pre-race briefing. Abt argued Buemi got too close to him on the final lap and stated his feeling he was overly defensive once past. Buemi countered this argument by suggesting Abt left him space to pass on the left. Piquet retired with a seat belt problem for the second successive race. He renewed criticism of Formula E's decision to drop the minimum pit stop time, suggesting the new regulation mandated other drivers to risk too much in shortening the amount of time spent in the pit lane and claimed those running in the top ten refitted their seat belts after the race, "It caused us to get the seatbelts loose at one point when I was adjusting them during the run. They got loose, they opened, and I had to stop."

The consequence of Vergne's victory increased his lead in the Drivers' Championship to 31 points over Bird. Rosenqvist now had 86 points and retained third position despite his eighth-place finish while Buemi kept fourth position with 70 points. Di Grassi's second-place finish moved him three positions from eighth to fifth with 58 points. In the Teams' Championship, Techeetah moved further ahead of Virgin by 19 points. Audi overtook Mahindra for third position, while Jaguar scored no points but retained fifth place with four races left in the season.

=== Race classification ===
Drivers who scored championship points are denoted in bold.

Final race classification
Pos.	No.	Driver	Team	Laps	Time/Retired	Grid	Points
1	**25**	**(France) Jean-Éric Vergne**	**Techeetah-Renault**	**49**	**54:49.102**	**1**	25+3^{4}
2	**1**	**(Brazil) Lucas di Grassi**	**Audi**	**49**	**+4.882**	**6**	18+1^{5}
3	**2**	**(United Kingdom) Sam Bird**	**Virgin-Citroën**	**49**	**+8.897**	**2**	15
4	**5**	**(Germany) Maro Engel**	**Venturi**	**49**	**+9.287**	**4**	12
5	**9**	**(Switzerland) Sébastien Buemi**	**e.Dams-Renault**	**49**	**+10.194**	**8**	10
6	**18**	**(Germany) André Lotterer**	**Techeetah-Renault**	**49**	**+10.855**	**3**	8
7	**66**	**(Germany) Daniel Abt**	**Audi**	**49**	**+13.918**	**14**	6
8	**19**	**(Sweden) Felix Rosenqvist**	**Mahindra**	**49**	**+15.271**	**11**	4
9	**16**	**(United Kingdom) Oliver Turvey**	**NIO**	**49**	**+19.557**	**9**	2
10	**6**	**(Argentina) José María López**	**Dragon-Penske**	**49**	**+20.989**	**10**	1
**11**	23	(Germany) Nick Heidfeld	Mahindra	49	+21.698	12	
**12**	7	(Belgium) Jérôme d'Ambrosio	Dragon-Penske	49	+26.723	7	
**13**	4	(Switzerland) Edoardo Mortara	Venturi	49	+29.937	19	
**14**	36	(United Kingdom) Alex Lynn	Virgin-Citroën	40	+43.112	15	
**15**	20	(New Zealand) Mitch Evans	Jaguar	49	+43.989	20	
**16**	8	(France) Nico Prost	e.Dams-Renault	48	+1 Lap	13	
**17**	68	(China) Ma Qinghua	NIO	46	+3 Laps	17	
**Ret**	3	(Brazil) Nelson Piquet Jr.	Jaguar	32	Seat belt	18	
**Ret**	27	(United Kingdom) Tom Blomqvist	Andretti-BMW	32	Damage	16	
**Ret**	28	(Portugal) António Félix da Costa	Andretti-BMW	2	Brakes	5	

Notes:

- **^4** — Three points for pole position.
- **^5** — One point for fastest lap.

== Standings after the race ==
Drivers' Championship standings

+/–	Pos	Driver	Points
	1	(France) Jean-Éric Vergne	147
	2	(United Kingdom) Sam Bird	116 (−31)
	3	(Sweden) Felix Rosenqvist	86 (−61)
	4	(Switzerland) Sébastien Buemi	70 (−77)
3	5	(Brazil) Lucas di Grassi	58 (−89)

Teams' Championship standings

+/–	Pos	Constructor	Points
	1	(China) Techeetah-Renault	188
	2	(United Kingdom) Virgin-Citroën	133 (−55)
3	3	(Germany) Audi	114 (−74)
1	4	(India) Mahindra	107 (−81)
	5	(United Kingdom) Jaguar	88 (−100)

- Notes: Only the top five positions are included for both sets of standings.

Previous race: 2018 Rome ePrix	FIA Formula E Championship; 2017–18 season	Next race: 2018 Berlin ePrix
Previous race: 2017 Paris ePrix	Paris ePrix	Next race: 2019 Paris ePrix
