= Paris ePrix =

Sports event in France

- Paris Street Circuit (2016–2019)
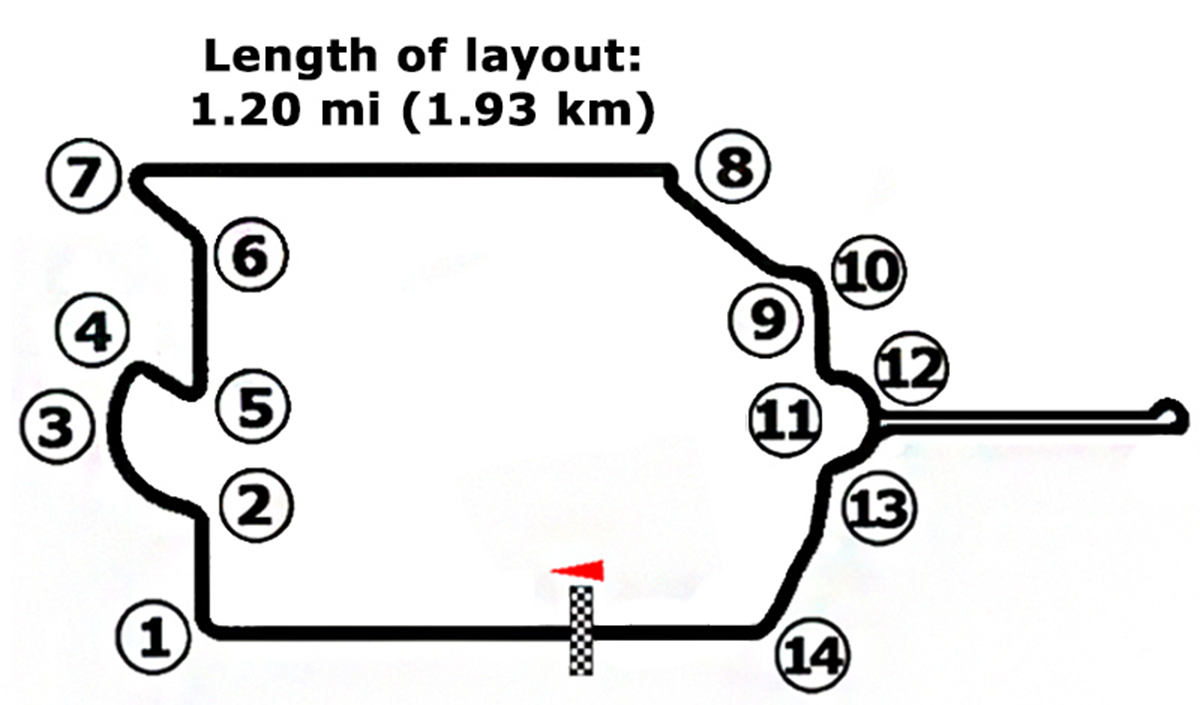

Race information
- Number of times held: 4
- First held: 2016
- Last held: 2019
- Circuit length: 1.930 km (1.200 miles)
- Laps: 49

Last race (2019)

Pole position
- (United Kingdom) Oliver Rowland; e.Dams-Nissan; 1:00.535

Podium
- 1. (Netherlands) Robin Frijns; Virgin−Audi; 47:50.510; 2. (Germany) André Lotterer; Techeetah-DS; +1.373; 3. (Germany) Daniel Abt; Audi; +3.175

Fastest lap
- (France) Tom Dillmann; NIO; 1:02.780

The Paris ePrix was an annual race of the single-seater, electrically powered Formula E championship, held in Paris, France. It was first raced in the 2015-16 season.

== Circuit ==
=== Circuit des Invalides ===
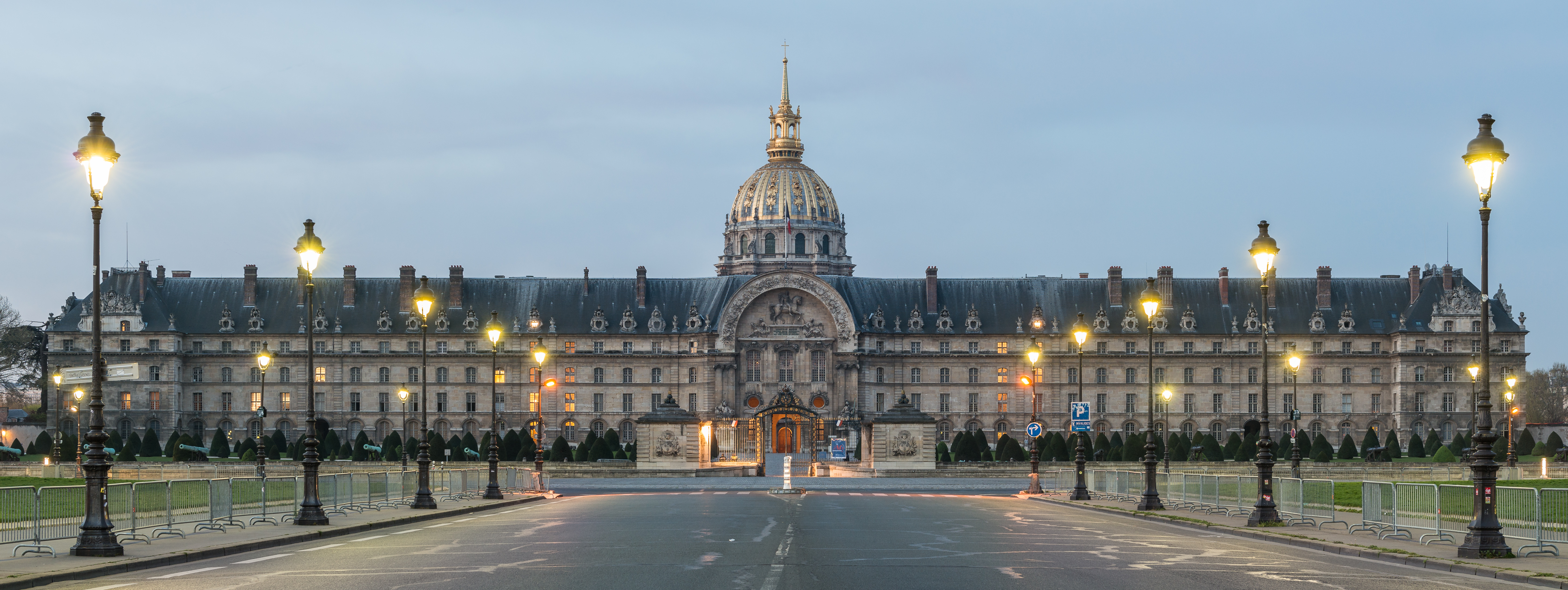
View from the Esplanade des Invalides, where the pit lane is located.

The track was 1.930 km (1.199 mi) in length and featured 14 turns. It went clock-wise around Les Invalides with the Musée de l'Armée and the tomb of Napoleon. The pit lane was located along the Esplanade des Invalides, north of Les Invalides. It was characterised by a slippery surface, and a short section at turn 3 with new tarmac temporarily placed over the cobblestones. It also featured the tightest pit lane between turns 14 and 1 in the entire calendar due to the tight hairpin turn before rejoining the track.

== Results ==
Edition	Track	Winner	Second	Third	Pole position	Fastest lap	Ref
2016	Circuit des Invalides	(Brazil) Lucas di Grassi; ABT Sportsline	(France) Jean-Éric Vergne; DS Virgin Racing	(Switzerland) Sébastien Buemi; DAMS	(United Kingdom) Sam Bird; DS Virgin Racing	(Germany) Nick Heidfeld; Mahindra Racing	
2017	Circuit des Invalides	(Switzerland) Sébastien Buemi; DAMS	(Argentina) José María López; DS Virgin Racing	(Germany) Nick Heidfeld; Mahindra Racing	(Switzerland) Sébastien Buemi; DAMS	(United Kingdom) Sam Bird; DS Virgin Racing	
2018	Circuit des Invalides	(France) Jean-Éric Vergne; Techeetah	(Brazil) Lucas di Grassi; Audi	(United Kingdom) Sam Bird; DS Virgin Racing	(France) Jean-Éric Vergne; Techeetah	(Brazil) Lucas di Grassi; Audi	
2019	Circuit des Invalides	(Netherlands) Robin Frijns; Virgin	(Germany) André Lotterer; Techeetah	(Germany) Daniel Abt; Audi	(United Kingdom) Oliver Rowland e.Dams	(France) Tom Dillmann; NIO	
2020	Cancelled due to COVID-19 in France						

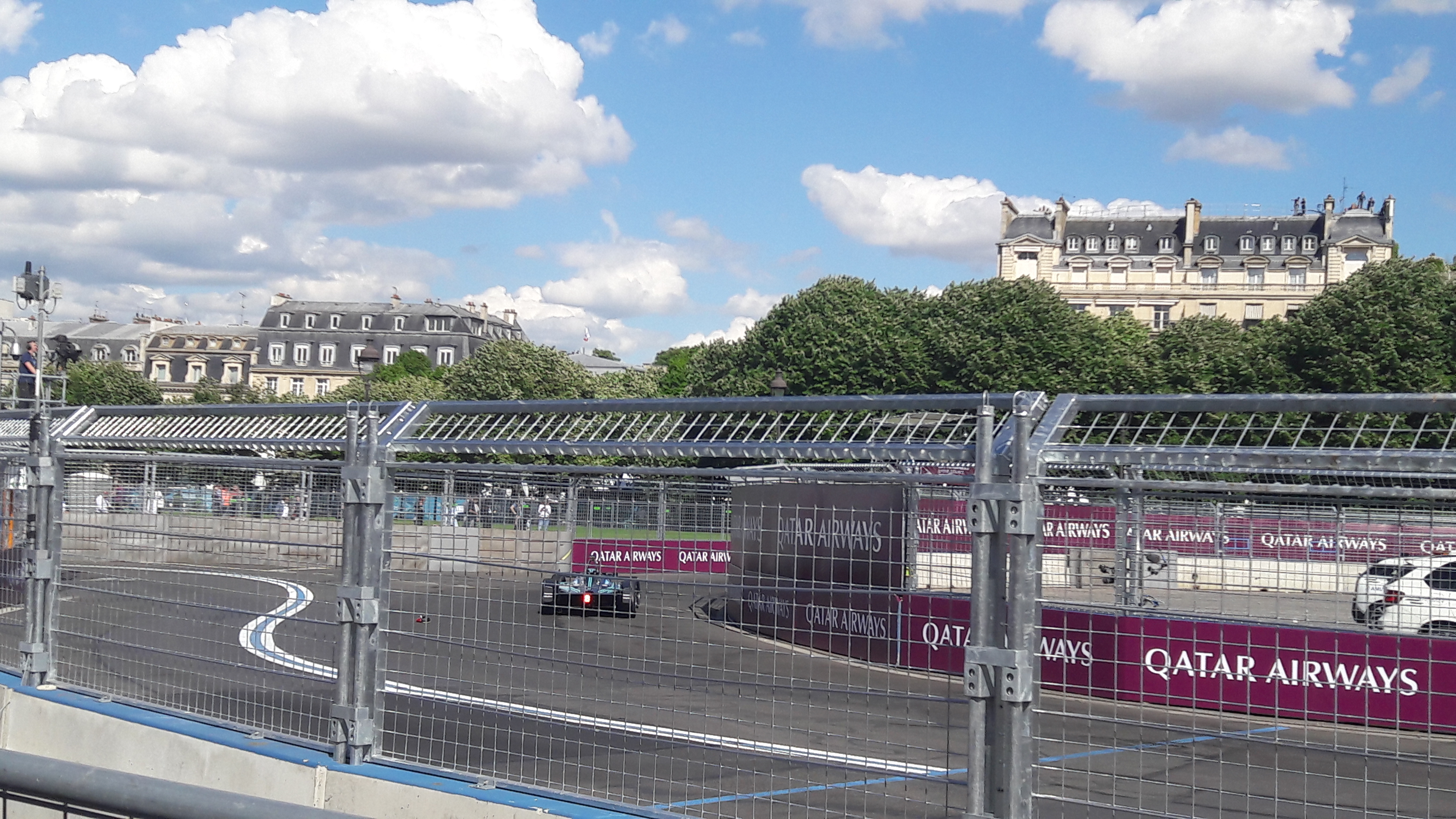
Photo from the 2017 Paris ePrix.
