= Paris Street Circuit =

Street circuit in Paris, France

Circuit des Invalides
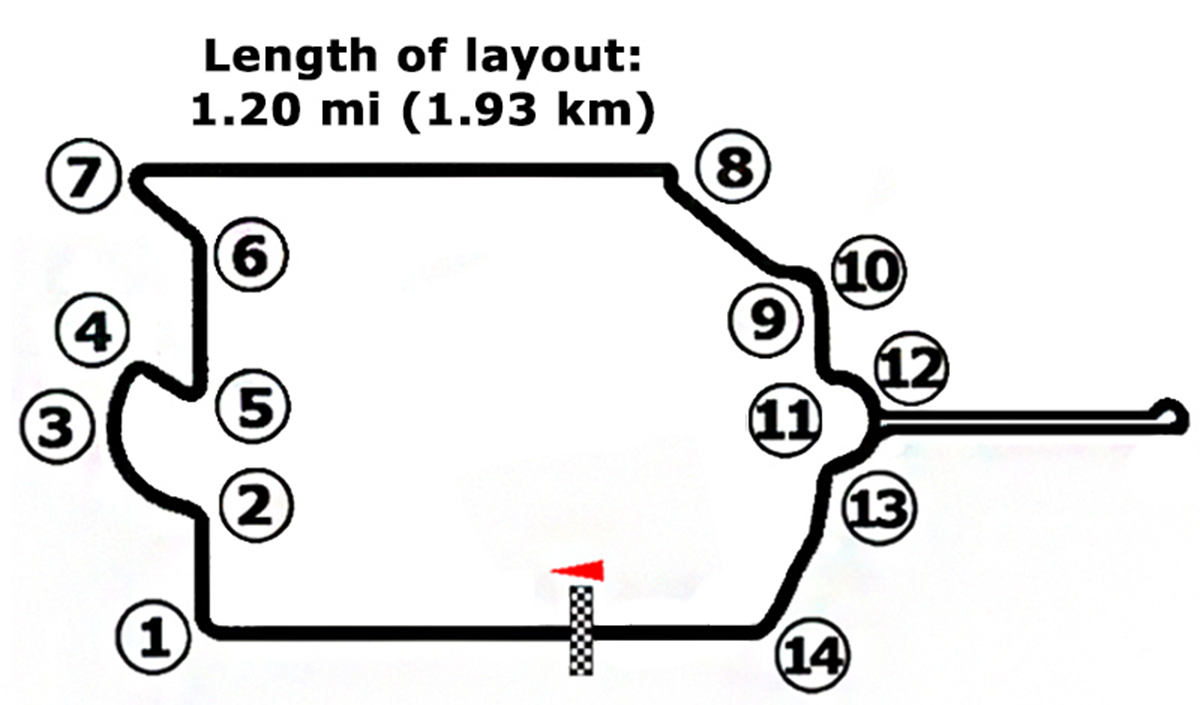
- Location: Paris, France
- Coordinates: 48°51′18″N 2°18′45″E
- Opened: 23 April 2016; 10 years ago
- Closed: 27 April 2019; 7 years ago
- Major events: Formula E Paris ePrix (2016–2019); Jaguar I-Pace eTrophy (2019)
- Website: http://www.paris-eprix.com/fr/

Formula E Circuit (2016–2019)
- Length: 1.930 km (1.199 mi)
- Turns: 14
- Race lap record: 1.02.323 ( (Germany) Nick Heidfeld, Mahindra M2ELECTRO, 2016, F-E)

The Circuit des Invalides was a street circuit located around Les Invalides in Paris, France. It was used for the Paris ePrix of the single-seater, electrically powered Formula E championship. It was first used on 23 April 2016 for the 2016 Paris ePrix.

== Layout ==
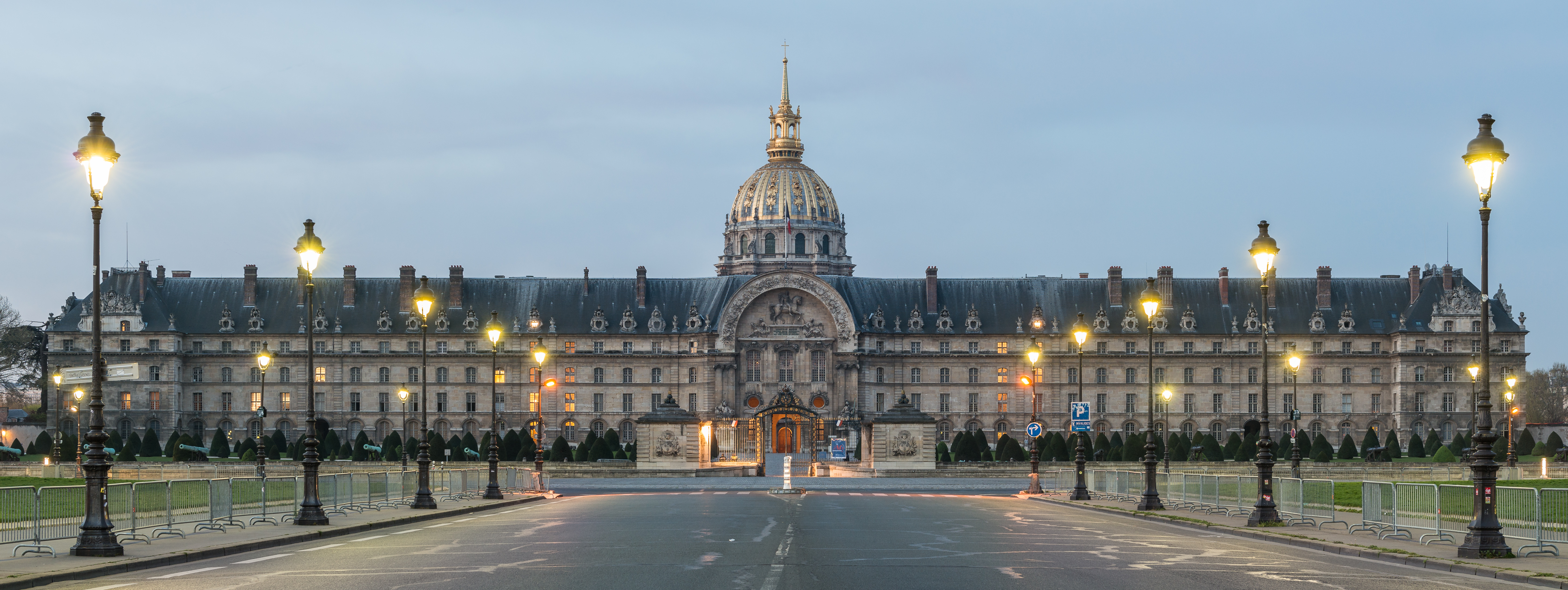
View from the Esplanade des Invalides, where the pit lane is located.

The track was 1.930 km (1.199 mi) in length and featured 14 turns. It went clock-wise around Les Invalides with the Musée de l'Armée and the tomb of Napoleon. The pit lane was located along the Esplanade des Invalides, north of Les Invalides. It was characterised by a slippery surface, and a short section at turn 3 with new tarmac temporarily placed over the cobblestones.

== Lap records ==
The official race lap records at the Paris Street Circuit are listed as:

Category	Time	Driver	Vehicle	Event
Formula E Circuit (2016–2019): 1.930 km (1.199 mi)
Formula E	1:02.323	Nick Heidfeld	Mahindra M2ELECTRO	2016 Paris ePrix
Jaguar I-Pace eTrophy	1:17.153	Simon Evans	Jaguar I-Pace eTrophy car	2019 Paris Jaguar I-Pace eTrophy round
