= 2018 Zurich ePrix =

Race 10 of 12 of the 2017–18 Formula E Championship
← Previous race	Next race →
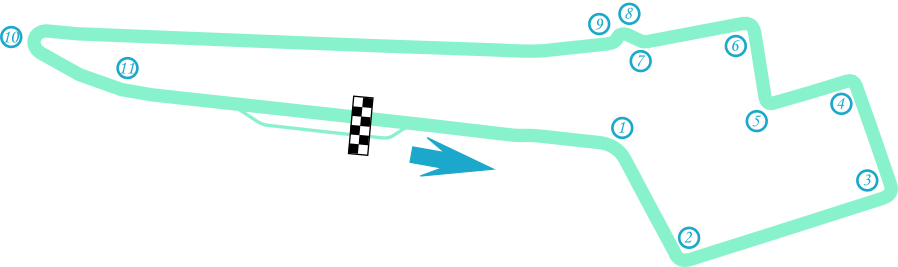

Race details
- Date: 10 June 2018
- Official name: 2018 Julius Baer Zurich E-Prix
- Location: Zurich Street Circuit, Zurich, Switzerland
- Course: Street circuit
- Course length: 2.465 km (1.532 mi)
- Distance: 39 laps, 96.135 km (59.736 mi)
- Weather: Hot and sunny
- Attendance: 150,000

Pole position
Driver	(New Zealand) Mitch Evans	Jaguar
- Time: 1:12.811

Fastest lap
Driver	(Germany) André Lotterer	Techeetah-Renault
- Time: 1:14.730 on lap 36

Podium
First	(Brazil) Lucas di Grassi	Audi
Second	(United Kingdom) Sam Bird	Virgin-Citroën
Third	(Belgium) Jérôme d'Ambrosio	Dragon-Penske

The 2018 Zurich ePrix (formally the 2018 Julius Baer Zurich E-Prix) was a Formula E electric car race held before a crowd of about 150,000 spectators at the Zurich Street Circuit in Zurich, Switzerland on 10 June 2018. It was the tenth round of the 2017–18 Formula E Championship, the inaugural running of the event, and the first international circuit race in Switzerland since the 1954 Swiss Grand Prix. The 39-lap race was won by Audi driver Lucas di Grassi after starting from fifth. Sam Bird finished second for Virgin and Dragon driver Jérôme d'Ambrosio was third.

Jaguar driver Mitch Evans won the first pole position of his career by recording the fastest lap in qualifying and he led the opening 17 laps despite reporting rising battery temperatures limiting his ability to harvest electrical energy under braking. Di Grassi gained positions by passing other drivers and he overtook Evans driving into the first corner at the start of lap 18 to take the lead. He maintained the lead for the remainder of the race to claim his first victory of the season and the seventh of his career by 7 1/2 seconds over Bird.

The consequence of the final positions meant Jean-Éric Vergne still led the Drivers' Championship despite a drive-through penalty for accelerating before a full course yellow was lifted to clear debris on the track. Bird narrowed Vergne's lead to 23 points and di Grassi's win moved him from sixth to third. Sébastien Buemi moved to fourth by finishing fifth and Felix Rosenqvist fell to fifth after scoring no points. Audi lowered Techeetah's advantage in the Teams' Championship to 33 points while Virgin maintained third with two races left in the season.

== Background ==
=== Preview ===
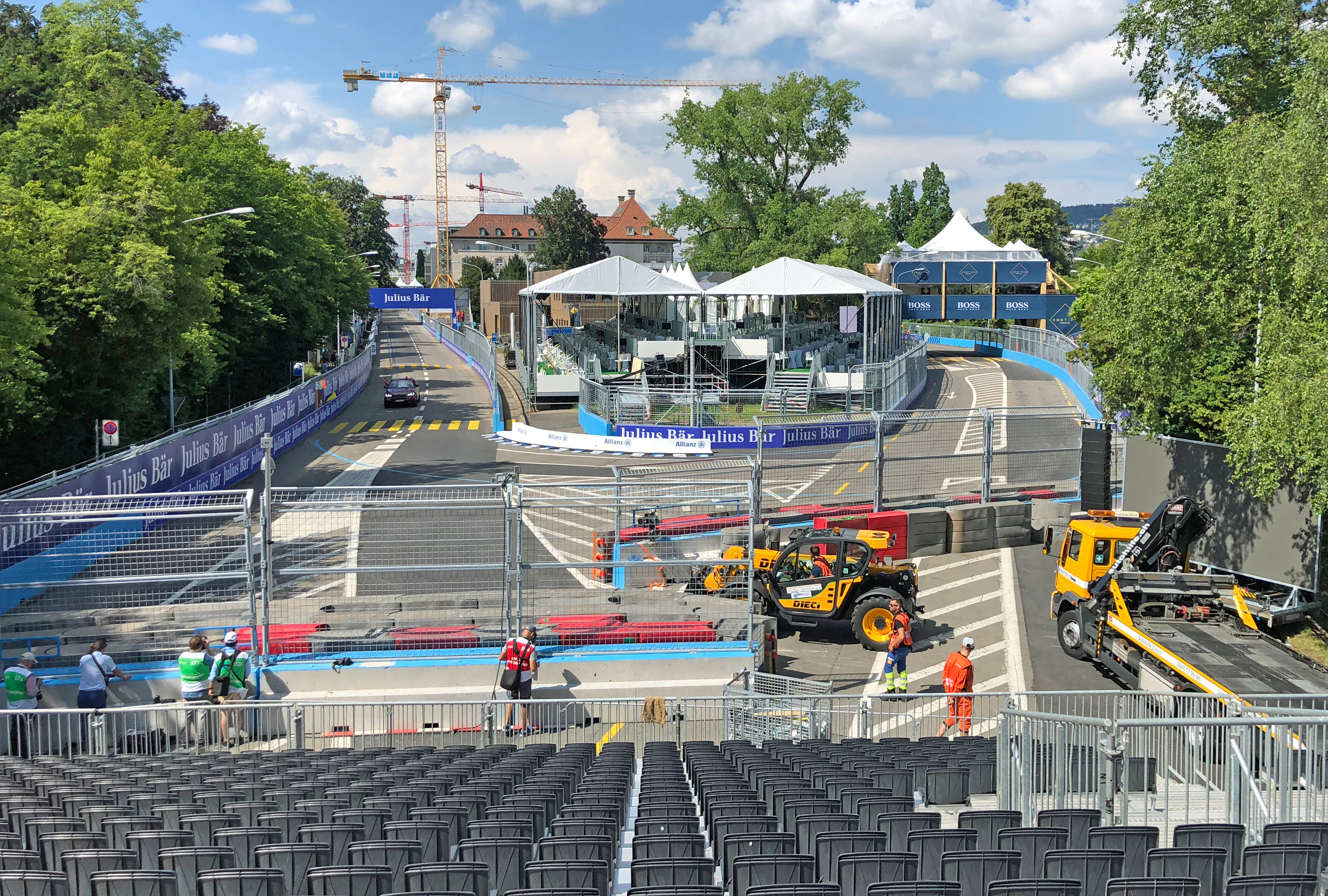
View of Mythenquai street the day before the ePrix.

There were ten teams of two drivers each for a total of 20 competitors entered for the event. Coming into the race from Berlin four weeks earlier, Techeetah driver Jean-Éric Vergne led the Drivers' Championship with 162 points. Virgin's Sam Bird was second with 122 points and Felix Rosenqvist of Mahindra was third with 86 points. Audi's Daniel Abt was close behind in fourth with 85 points and Sébastien Buemi of e.Dams-Renault was close behind in fifth with 82 points. Techeetah led the Teams' Championship with 205 points; Audi were second with 161 points and Virgin were third with 139 points. Mahindra were in fourth with 108 points and Jaguar were fifth with 96 points. 87 points were available for the season's final three races which meant Vergne could clinch the Championship in Zurich. Vergne needed to win the race with Bird failing to score any points to win his first Drivers' Championship. Vergne finishing second would mean that Bird would have to win both New York City races with the former not scoring points to become the champion on count-back.

=== Preparations ===
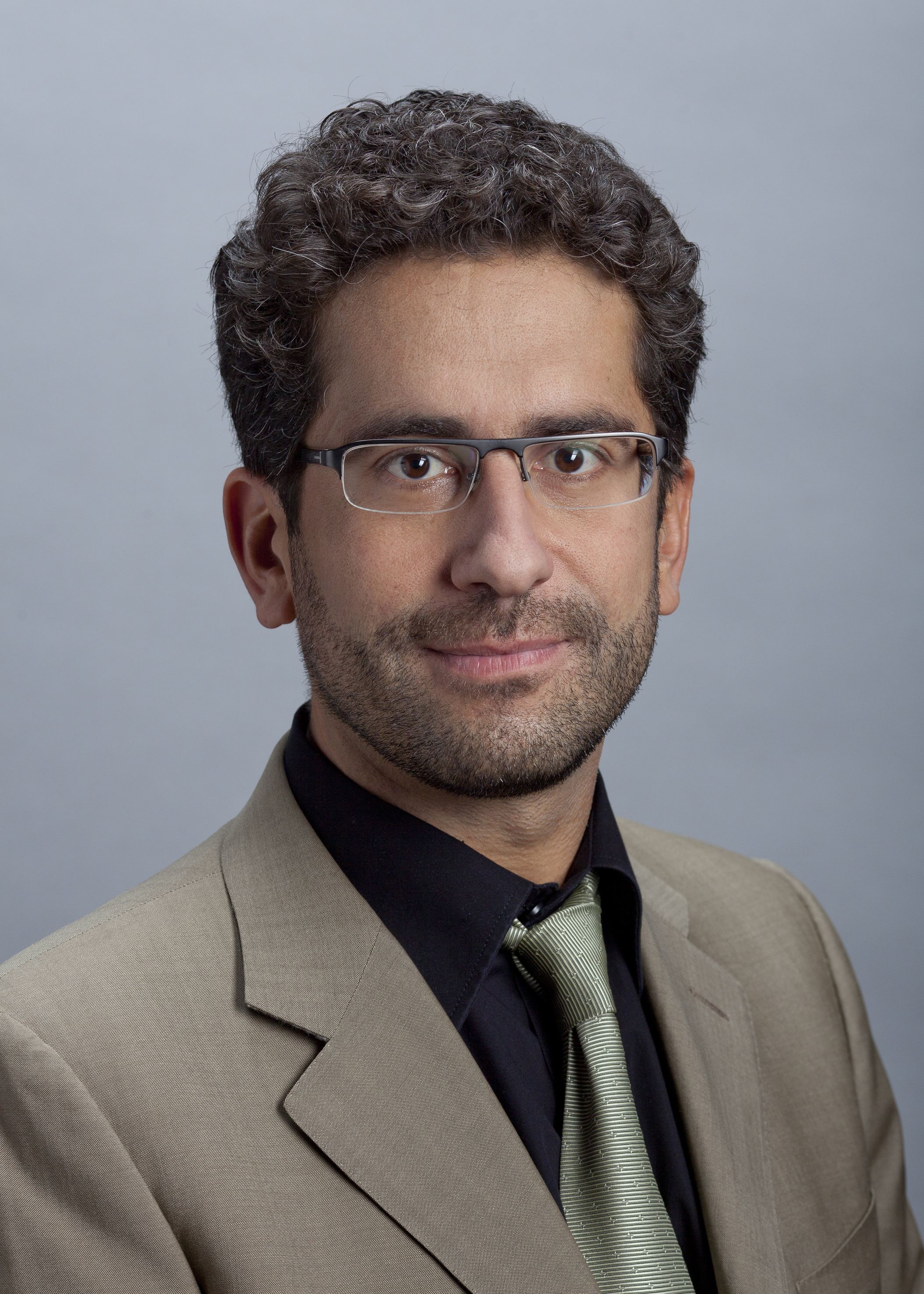
Fathi Derder was instrumental in Zurich's Formula E debut by putting forward a motion to exempt electric cars from a long-standing ban on motor racing in Switzerland that the Council of States adopted in December 2015.

Preparations for a Formula E race in Switzerland commenced in March 2015 when the Council of States backed a motion put forward by the National Councillor Fathi Derder to exempt electric car racing from a long-standing ban on motor racing in the country. (Note: The ban was implemented in response to the 1955 Le Mans disaster in which 84 people were killed.) The motion was adopted by the Federal Council in December, allowing electric vehicles to race in Switzerland from 1 April 2016 pending authorisation from local authorities with regards to maximum speeds. Organisers then began putting forward their candidacies for cities to hold the race. They plead for the ePrix to be held in Lugano on 7 May 2016 to replace the Berlin ePrix but this was withdrawn because the required funding of €10 million was not raised and they later supported holding it in Switzerland's largest city Zurich. On 21 September 2017, Zurich was included on the 2017–18 Championship's final calendar in a FIA World Motor Sport Council meeting in Paris. It was the tenth of twelve scheduled single seater electric car rounds of the 2017–18 Championship and took place at the Zurich Street Circuit on 10 June 2018. Prior to the ePrix, Switzerland's last motor race was the 1954 Swiss Grand Prix at Circuit Bremgarten in Bern: Switzerland banned most motor racing in 1955 after the 1955 Le Mans disaster. Organisers of the race expected around 25,000 to 150,000 people to attend.

Although it was reported in the local press that Zurich City Council had granted permission for the race to be run, a spokesperson denied these reports two hours later. However, the city council did give their approval for the race to be held the following month. Preparation for the ePrix commenced, and a three-year contract was signed with the option for an extension to 2024, which was subsequently increased by another three years to 2027. Permits were granted by the office of the mayor of Zurich Corine Mauch to project leader Pascal Derron who led negotiations with local politicians. Derron ensured those who provided the city's infrastructure services were satisfied the ePrix could be held. In December, a board member of Zurich's pedestrian association filed a complaint with Zurich City Council concerning the event. He sought for a referendum as the city was paying CHF 2 million towards the race and argued there was a risk of deteriorating the quality of life and disrupting local transport routes. No action was taken by Zurich City Council.

The layout of the 11-turn 2.46 km (1.53 mi) circuit was not designed by a professional planner like other tracks but by the CEO of e-Mobil Züri Roger Tognella and his son Andrin by using Google Earth on their home computer. It was officially unveiled to the public on 5 January 2018. Drivers began a lap of the circuit on Enge Harbour at Mythenquai and the layout led back to the harbour via the Stockerstrasse and Alfred-Escher-Strasse streets. The track had different surfaces such as circuit asphalt and new concrete. Some tramlines at turns seven and nine were filled for the weekend and others were untouched. Because of cobblestones in the pit lane, teams adapted to a new software mode as the speed limit was lowered to 30 km/h (19 mph). Construction of the circuit began in late May and local officials ensured the public lost no access to the city's roadside infrastructure. It was dismantled on 12 June, two days after the ePrix. Buemi stated his belief that a low-downforce set-up would provide drivers with opportunities to reach their top speeds on the two long straights.

== Practice ==
Two practice sessions—both on Sunday morning—were held before the early evening race. The first session ran for 45 minutes and the second lasted half an hour. A half an hour untimed shakedown session was held on Saturday afternoon to enable teams to check the reliability of their cars and their electronic systems at low speed. In the first practice session, held in warm weather, di Grassi used 200 kW (270 hp) of power to set the fastest lap of 1 minute, 11.995 seconds. Jaguar's Mitch Evans, Abt, Nelson Piquet Jr. of Jaguar, Oliver Turvey for NIO, Bird, Vergne, Rosenqvist, Buemi and José María López of Dragon placed second through tenth. During practice, which saw several drivers venture deep onto the run-off areas, Bird was close by the electrical energy conservative López and was impeded by him at the final corner. López caught Bird out by braking early and trying to let him through on the main straight and Bird lost control of his car's rear on the bumpy track by locking his front brakes. Bird crashed into the barrier, damaging his right-rear suspension and steering but returned to the pit lane to switch into a second car. Turvey damaged his suspension by glancing a barrier and Stéphane Sarrazin of Andretti and Luca Filippi for NIO stopped at turns one and two towards the session's conclusion.

After first practice, an annoyed Bird went to López's garage, confronted him about the crash, and the latter attempted to explain his perspective to Bird. López then spoke to his team who reviewed television footage of the incident and apologised to Bird through the media. In second practice, Rosenqvist was fastest with a maximum power lap of 1 minute, 12.007 seconds that he set ten minutes before practice concluded. Evans was 0.054 seconds slower in second and the Dragon pair of Jérôme d'Ambrosio and López were third and fourth. The rest of the top ten heading into qualifying were Virgin's Alex Lynn, Bird, Vergne, André Lotterer of Techeetah, Buemi and Piquet. Traffic forestalling competitor's running and several drivers locked their brakes. Some again went onto the track's run-off areas. Buemi spun entering turn four but sustained light damage to his vehicle's rear from contact with the outside barrier. López locked his rear tyres under braking for turn one and slid sideways into the left-hand side TecPro barrier but he returned to the pit lane with minor bodywork damage. In the session's closing seconds, Lotterer misjudged his braking point and hit the rear of Nico Prost's e.Dams-Renault car at the turn ten hairpin, dislodging Prost's left-rear sidepod.

== Qualifying ==
Sunday's afternoon qualifying session ran for an hour and was divided into four groups of five cars. Each group was determined by a lottery system and was permitted six minutes of on-track activity. All drivers were limited to two timed laps with one at maximum power. The fastest five overall competitors in the four groups participated in a "Super Pole" session with one driver on the track at any time going out in reverse order from fifth to first. Each of the five drivers was limited to one timed lap and the starting order was determined by the competitor's fastest times. (Super Pole from first to fifth, and group qualifying from sixth to twentieth). The driver and team who recorded the fastest time were awarded three points towards their respective championships.

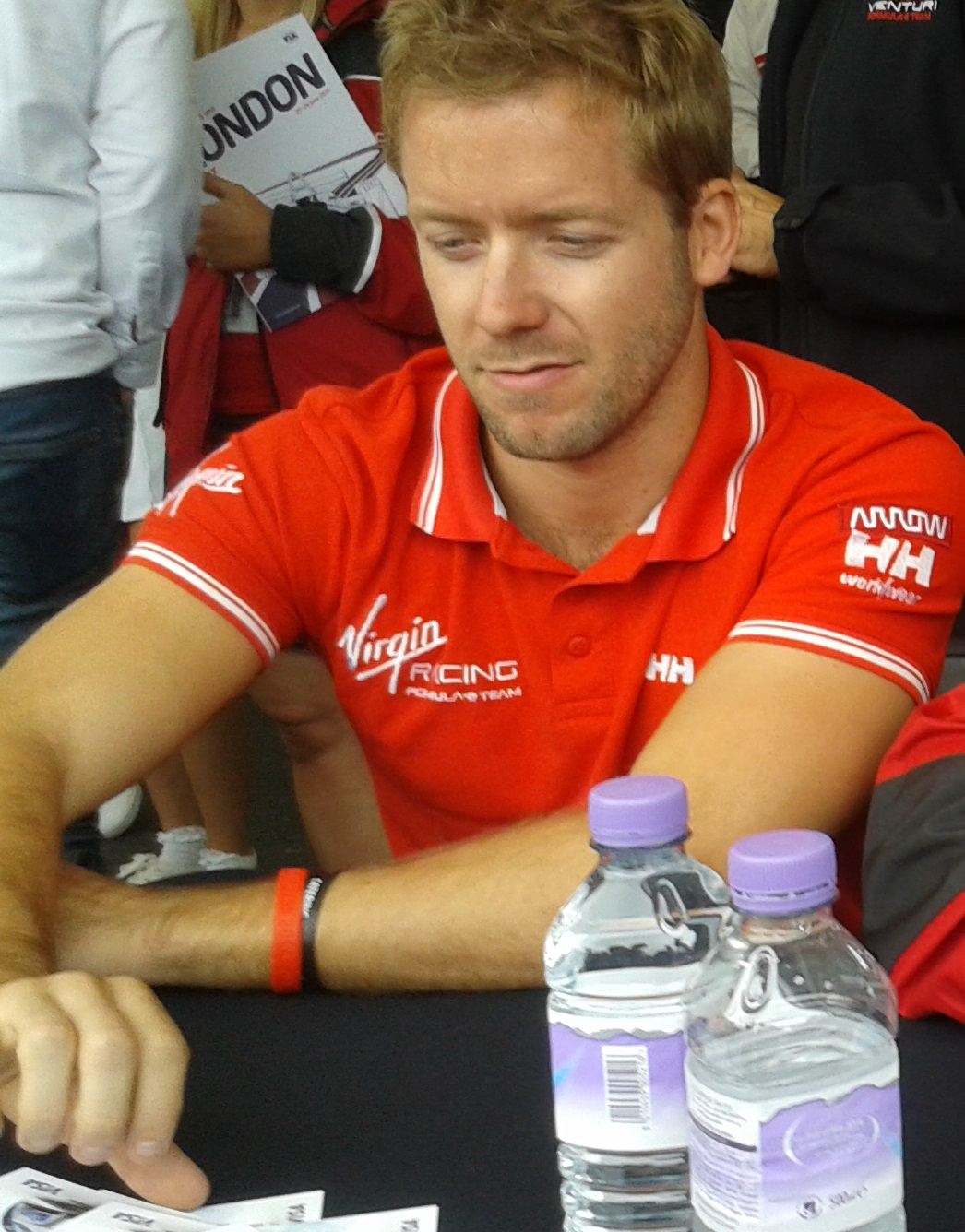
Sam Bird (pictured in 2015) was the highest-placed championship contender by starting from third and finishing second.

In the first group of five runners, all competitors bar Vergne waited for four minutes to begin their lap times on the bumpy track. Bird paced the session with a benchmark time, ahead of Buemi, Rosenqvist and Abt. Pole position favourite Vergne could not feel the grip in his car and was the first group's slowest driver. Vergne was summoned to the stewards and reprimanded for violating series regulations because his team misread the line indicating the end of the second sector. This meant he intermittently activated the 200 kW (270 hp) power mode approximately 100 m (330 ft) before then. Evans set the fastest overall lap time in group qualifying in group two of 1 minute, 12.594 seconds. Lotterer took second in the closing seconds of the group, and di Grassi and Piquet were third and fourth. Turvey glanced the turn two barrier with his right-rear wheel, bending a track-rod and he was slowest overall in group qualifying. Track conditions improved as each group passed and attention switched to the third group and whether they could demote the championship contenders further down the grid. However, nobody in group three recorded a lap that put them in the top five as Lynn was fastest, followed by Heidfeld, Edoardo Mortara of Venturi and Andretti driver António Félix da Costa. Venturi's Maro Engel made an error and was the third group's slowest driver.

In group four, the Dragon pair of d'Ambrosio and López were first and second and prevented di Grassi from entering super pole. Prost lost confidence after locking his tyres on his warm-up lap but came within 0.023 seconds of teammate Buemi for seventh overall. Sarrazin and Filippi were group four's two slowest drivers. At the end of group qualifying, Evans, d'Ambrosio, López, Lotterer and Bird qualified for super pole. Evans was the last driver to set a super pole lap and took a wide line over the bumps at turn one. He took his and Jaguar's first pole position in single seater racing with an error-free lap of 1 minute, 12.811 seconds. He was joined on the grid's front row by Lotterer—his best qualifying performance of the season—who had pole position until Evans' lap. Bird, who was first on-track, clipped the barrier for third and it prevented him from reducing Vergne's lead in the Drivers' Championship. D'Ambrosio appeared to go faster than Lotterer but he lost a tenth of a second at the final turn and took fourth. Fifth-placed López drifted sideways and lost a second as he narrowly avoided hitting a wall leaving the turn one right-hander. After qualifying, López received a three-place grid penalty for not slowing under yellow flag conditions in first practice. Lynn lost the same amount of positions due to an inter-team miscommunication that caused him to drive into the fast lane of the pit lane before it opened for group three.

=== Qualifying classification ===
Final qualifying classification
Pos.	No.	Driver	Team	GS	SP	Grid
1	20	(New Zealand) Mitch Evans	Jaguar	1:12.594	1:12.811	1
2	18	(Germany) André Lotterer	Techeetah-Renault	1:12.906	1:12.948	2
3	2	(United Kingdom) Sam Bird	Virgin-Citroën	1:12.981	1:13.022	3
4	7	(Belgium) Jérôme d'Ambrosio	Dragon-Penske	1:12.857	1:13.096	4
5	6	(Argentina) José María López	Dragon-Penske	1:12.877	1:13.927	8^{1}
6	1	(Brazil) Lucas di Grassi	Audi	1:13.042	—N/a	5
7	9	(Switzerland) Sébastien Buemi	e.Dams-Renault	1:13.061	—N/a	6
8	8	(France) Nico Prost	e.Dams-Renault	1:13.084	—N/a	7
9	66	(Germany) Daniel Abt	Audi	1:13.107	—N/a	9
10	19	(Sweden) Felix Rosenqvist	Mahindra	1:13.214	—N/a	10
11	3	(Brazil) Nelson Piquet Jr.	Jaguar	1:13.380	—N/a	11
12	36	(United Kingdom) Alex Lynn	Virgin-Citroën	1:13.393	—N/a	15^{2}
13	23	(Germany) Nick Heidfeld	Mahindra	1:13.405	—N/a	12
14	4	(Switzerland) Edoardo Mortara	Venturi	1:13.413	—N/a	13
15	28	(Portugal) António Félix da Costa	Andretti-BMW	1:13.422	—N/a	14
16	27	(France) Stéphane Sarrazin	Andretti-BMW	1:13.500	—N/a	16
17	25	(France) Jean-Éric Vergne	Techeetah-Renault	1:13.524	—N/a	17
18	5	(Germany) Maro Engel	Venturi	1:13.541	—N/a	18
19	68	(Italy) Luca Filippi	NIO	1:14.067	—N/a	19
20	16	(United Kingdom) Oliver Turvey	NIO	1:14.139	—N/a	20

Notes:

- ^1 — José María López received a three-place grid penalty for speeding under yellow flag conditions during the first practice session.
- ^2 — Alex Lynn was demoted three places because of a miscommunication that caused him to drive in the fast lane of the pit lane before his qualifying group.

== Race ==
The weather at the start of the race was dry and sunny with the air temperature between 27.175 and 28 °C (80.915 and 82.400 °F) and the track temperatures ranged from 30.55 to 31.1 °C (86.99 to 87.98 °F). The hot weather caused teams to prioritise battery temperature maintenance. A special feature of Formula E is the "FanBoost" feature, an additional 100 kW (130 hp) of power to use in the driver's second car. The three drivers who were allowed to use the boost were determined by a fan vote. For the Zurich race, Buemi, di Grassi and Rosenqvist were handed the extra power. Around 150,000 people attended the event. The ePrix began at 18:04 Central European Summer Time (UTC+02:00) rather than the usual 16:04 because Formula E did not wish to clash with the men's singles finals of the French Open and race organisers held it on a Sunday for better localised traffic management. Evans made a good start and defended his lead from Lotterer on the approach to turn one. Lotterer then blocked Bird from taking second. Di Grassi tried to pass d'Ambrosio on the outside for fourth but no space was left for an overtake. The rest of the field passed through the next sequence of corners with minor contact and it appeared all had escaped without issue. However, as everybody closed up at the Tramstop chicane, Piquet mounted the rear of Abt's car, removing Abt's rear wing and a section of Piquet's front wing. The accident scattered debris on the track.

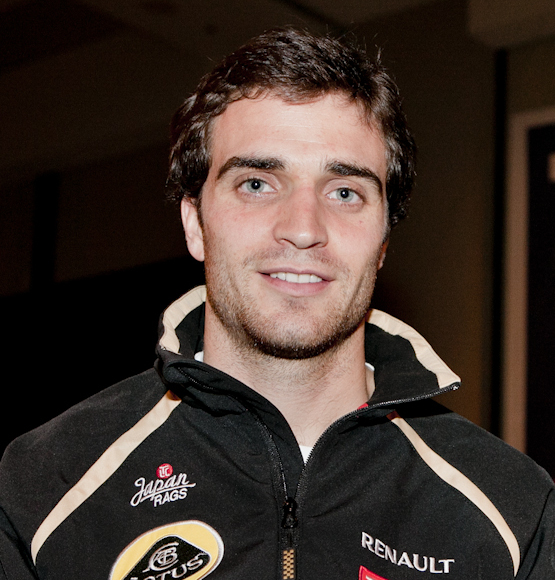
Jérôme d'Ambrosio (pictured in 2012) took his first podium in Formula E since the second 2016 London ePrix round.

At the end of the first lap, Evans led Lotterer by two seconds and Bird, d'Ambrosio and di Grassi were close by. Vergne overtook Engel to move into sixteenth place while di Grassi passed d'Ambrosio entering the Tramstop chicane around the inside for the fourth position on the next lap. D'Ambrosio lost fifth to Buemi entering turn one at the start of the third lap. By the next lap, Piquet and Abt were shown the black flag with an orange disc, which required them to enter the pit lane for repairs to their cars. Both entered the pit lane on the following lap. In the meantime, Evans reported rising battery temperatures, lessening his ability to harvest electrical energy under braking. On lap eight, one of Mortara's tie-rods on his right-rear suspension sheared on a kerb heading to the Tramstop chicane and forcing him to retire. By the ninth lap, Vergne moved into the top ten with successive overtakes on Lynn, Mortara and Heidfeld entering the first corner as he conserved electrical energy. Similarly, Di Grassi had an electrical energy advantage over the top three due to the better efficiency of his Audi's powertrain.

He used this to close up enough to Bird and overtake him for third place by turning left on the entry to turn ten on lap 13. Di Grassi had enough momentum to provide him with an opportunity to pass Lotterer on the outside into turn ten on the next lap but Lotterer turned right to block him. He tried again on the start/finish straight but Lotterer again blocked di Grassi. At his third try at the beginning of lap 16, di Grassi aggressively overtook Lotterer for second into the first turn. Further back in the field on the 17th lap, Vergne steered right entering turn one as he to pass the eighth-placed Rosenqvist on his left. Rosenqvist resisted Vergne's attack and the two made contact. He slid wide into a TecPro barrier at the first corner while Vergne continued without damage to his car. Rosenqvist extricated himself from the barrier; debris from his car littered the track and his front wing detached leaving turn two. At the end of the same lap, Evans held off di Grassi driving into the turn ten hairpin, but di Grassi had more usable electrical energy and overtook Evans into the first corner at the start of the lap 18.

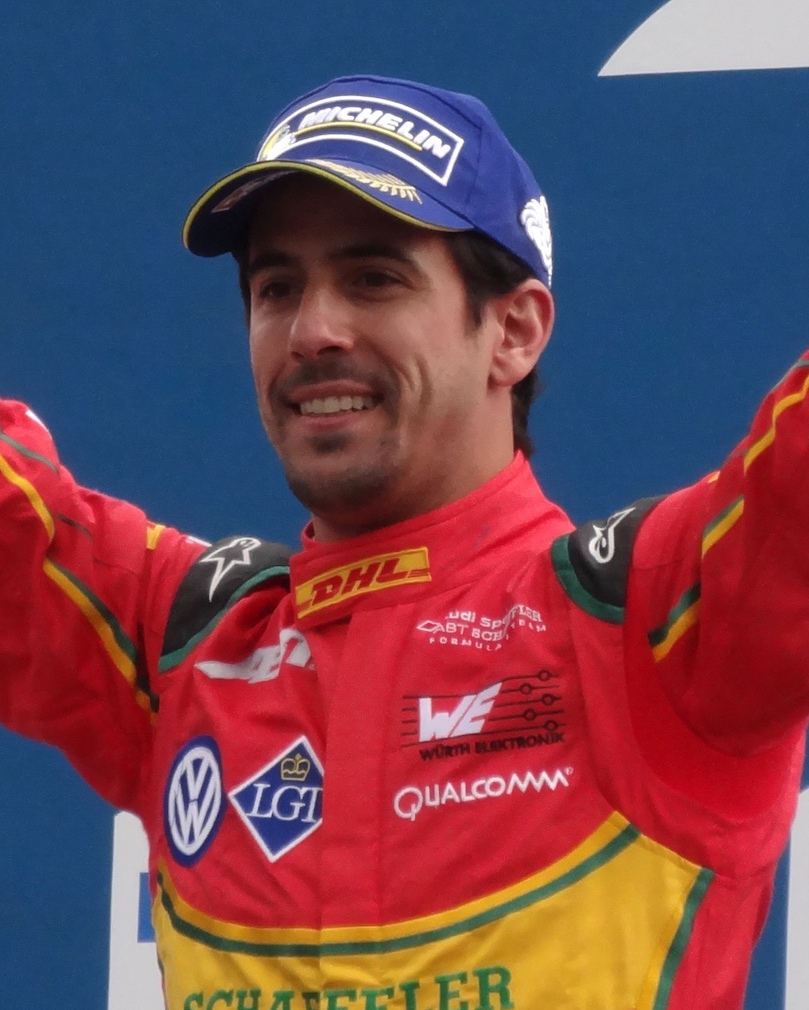
Lucas di Grassi (pictured in 2016) led a race-high 22 laps for his first victory of the season and the seventh of his career.

Di Grassi began to pull away from Evans as Buemi overtook Bird into turn one for fourth on the 19th lap. Soon after, Vergne was about to get ahead of d'Ambrosio for seventh when he hit Rosenqvist's detached front wing because the latter was to his left but Vergne avoided picking up a front-right puncture. In response, race director Scot Elkins activated the full course yellow procedure to allow marshals to remove debris from the track. During the full course yellow, the field chose to make their mandatory pit stops to change into a second vehicle at the conclusion of lap 19. Di Grassi kept the lead from Evans and Lotterer while Vergne lost 12 seconds because he had trouble starting his car when he tried to exit his garage, falling to ninth. Piquet retired with a broken driveshaft on lap 21. Eight laps later, it was announced Evans, Lotterer, Buemi, López and Vergne were under investigation by the stewards for exceeding the 50 km/h (31 mph) speed limit during the full course yellow procedure. The first four were issued drive-through penalties on the next lap. Evans and Lotterer took their penalties at the start of lap 31 while Buemi and López served theirs at the end of that lap. Vergne received a drive-through penalty on lap 32.

Prost's brakes failed into the turn ten hairpin and he ran straight into the barrier to the outside of the track on lap 33. Vergne took his penalty at the conclusion of the 34th lap. He emerged in 12th place behind Engel, whom he overtook into the turn ten hairpin. Buemi activated his FanBoost to pass Evans into turn one at the beginning of the 36th lap. On the same lap, Lotterer earned one championship point for setting the race's fastest lap of 1 minute, 14.730 seconds. Unhindered in the final 20 laps, di Grassi opened his lead to more than seven seconds and finished first after 39 laps to claim his first victory of the season and the seventh of his career. Bird followed 7.542 later in second and the drive-through penalties helped d'Ambrosio take his first podium finish since the second 2016 London ePrix race. Off the podium, Lotterer finished fourth, Buemi fifth and Heidfeld sixth. Evans came seventh and Félix da Costa had a clean race in eighth. Turvey held off Vergne for ninth by six-tenths of a second. The final finishers were Engel, López, Abt, Sarrazin, Rosenqvist and Lynn. There were two lead changes among two drivers during the event. Di Grassi led once for a race-high 22 laps.

=== Post-race ===
The top three drivers appeared on the podium to collect their trophies and spoke to the media in a later press conference. Di Grassi spoke of his happiness over winning and dedicated it to his unborn son Leonardo, adding that "The weekend was amazing and the event here was fantastic. You could hear the huge number of people cheering all over the track. I tried to save a bit more energy in the first half of the first stint, and then managed to overtake the next three cars." Bird said he was disappointed after qualifying third but was confident he could challenge di Grassi in the New York City ePrix double header, "We settled into a rhythm in the race and it’s become apparent that I have to lift more than the people around me. That’s just the way it is – but we’ve got ourselves in this fantastic position in the title fight, and scored second place today – with a little bit of luck I have to say." Third-placed D'Ambrosio said he adapted his strategy to conserve electrical energy, "It was emotional, but a steady race, I did the best I could to bring it home and that was important. We still have some work to do in the race, especially on my side. In qualifying I’ve done a really good job in the last three races, and we’ve done a tremendous job since Berlin, but we need to better ourselves for New York."

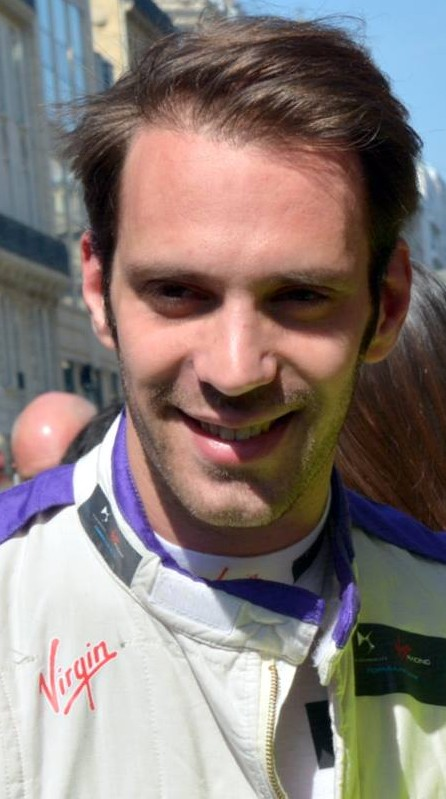
Jean-Éric Vergne (pictured in 2016) maintained the lead of the Drivers' Championship after the race.

Allan McNish, the team principal of Audi, commented on his surprise di Grassi won despite starting fifth, "When he got up in fourth and then the speed with which he caught Sam [Bird] then I thought, ‘crikey, this is on’. To be leading coming in to the pit stop was mighty but at the stop there was a worry about an unsafe release but Lucas was flawless in the race. It was a very accomplished win and so deserving for him after the start to the season." Rosenqvist spoke to Vergne after the media left the paddock and accepted an apology from Vergne for his lap 17 crash. Rosenqvist said it was a misunderstanding with a serious consequence for him, "Just as I turned in he dived at the last moment and I had to do something not to hit him. But genuinely, I tried to let him through but it didn’t work out like that as I was the one who lost out and he went free, which is a bit harsh." Evans admitted to feeling conflicted after taking his maiden pole position and finishing seventh, "Our first Formula E pole position was a huge motivation boost for the troupe and showed how far we have come in the meantime, unfortunately the race did not go that way as we had hoped."

Evans, Lotterer and López were later discovered to have not slowed sufficiently by the time the full course yellow was activated on lap 19 while Buemi and Vergne were penalised for accelerating just before the system was lifted on the next lap. Lotterer argued the stewards should improve the leniency in their decision making when no driver gained an advantage and felt the penalty he received prevented him from getting onto the podium, "It’s the rules, there’s no point complaining about it but it’s super frustrating. You wish that something they would let a few things slide as it didn’t change anyone’s position." Buemi said he felt his early reaction to the lifting of the full course yellow was caused by him not being able to hear the race director over his radio momentarily and it prompted him to brake sharply out of uncertainty. Vergne accused Formula E of creating a new regulation during the event to allow for increased suspense in the championship at the season-ending New York City ePrix, "It's weird, it's five of us getting penalised. We're not daft, we've been racing these cars all year with Full Course Yellows, we never got penalties. Now, suddenly, there are five drivers [getting one]: four ahead of Bird, and me. It's a bit weird."

The consequence of the race meant Vergne still led the Drivers' Championship with 163 points but his lead over Bird narrowed to 23 points because of Bird's second-place finish. With 101 points, di Grassi's victory moved him from sixth to third. Buemi's fifth-place finish moved him to fourth with 92 points and Rosenqvist fell to fifth after scoring no points. Techeetah retained first in the Teams' Championship with 219 points. Audi moved to within 33 points of Techeetah and Virgin dropped further back in third. Mahindra and Jaguar maintained fourth and fifth with two races left in the season. The 2019 race was relocated to Bern after Zürich city officials expressed concerns about the ability of its infrastructure to handle a series of large-scale events in quick succession.

=== Race classification ===
Drivers who scored championship points are denoted in bold.

Final race classification
Pos.	No.	Driver	Team	Laps	Time/Retired	Grid	Points
1	**1**	**(Brazil) Lucas di Grassi**	**Audi**	**39**	**51:19.811**	**5**	25
2	**2**	**(United Kingdom) Sam Bird**	**Virgin-Citroën**	**39**	**+7.542**	**3**	18
3	**7**	**(Belgium) Jérôme d'Ambrosio**	**Dragon-Penske**	**39**	**+16.822**	**4**	15
4	**18**	**(Germany) André Lotterer**	**Techeetah-Renault**	**39**	**+20.295**	**2**	12+1^{3}
5	**9**	**(Switzerland) Sébastien Buemi**	**e.Dams-Renault**	**39**	**+26.692**	**6**	10
6	**23**	**(Germany) Nick Heidfeld**	**Mahindra**	**39**	**+28.059**	**12**	8
7	**20**	**(New Zealand) Mitch Evans**	**Jaguar**	**39**	**+30.631**	**1**	6+3^{4}
8	**28**	**(Portugal) António Félix da Costa**	**Andretti-BMW**	**39**	**+31.301**	**14**	4
9	**16**	**(United Kingdom) Oliver Turvey**	**NIO**	**39**	**+32.180**	**20**	2
10	**25**	**(France) Jean-Éric Vergne**	**Techeetah-Renault**	**39**	**+32.833**	**17**	1
11	5	(Germany) Maro Engel	Venturi	39	+34.604	18	
12	6	(Argentina) José María López	Dragon-Penske	39	+35.206	8	
13	66	(Germany) Daniel Abt	Audi	39	+46.222	9	
14	27	(France) Stéphane Sarrazin	Andretti-BMW	39	+1:09.505	16^{5}	
15	19	(Sweden) Felix Rosenqvist	Mahindra	38	+1 Lap	10	
16	36	(United Kingdom) Alex Lynn	Virgin-Citroën	38	+1 Lap	15	
Ret	8	(France) Nico Prost	e.Dams-Renault	31	Brakes	7	
Ret	68	(Italy) Luca Filippi	NIO	20	Retired	19	
Ret	3	(Brazil) Nelson Piquet Jr.	Jaguar	20	Driveshaft	11	
Ret	4	(Switzerland) Edoardo Mortara	Venturi	6	Suspension	13	

Notes:

- **^3** — One point for fastest lap.
- **^4** — Three points for pole position.
- **^5** — Stéphane Sarrazin was penalised 22 seconds for an unsafe pit stop release.

== Standings after the race ==
Drivers' Championship standings

+/–	Pos	Driver	Points
	1	(France) Jean-Éric Vergne	163
	2	(United Kingdom) Sam Bird	140 (−23)
3	3	(Brazil) Lucas di Grassi	101 (−62)
1	4	(Switzerland) Sébastien Buemi	92 (−71)
2	5	(Sweden) Felix Rosenqvist	86 (−77)

Teams' Championship standings

+/–	Pos	Constructor	Points
	1	(China) Techeetah-Renault	219
	2	(Germany) Audi	186 (−33)
	3	(United Kingdom) Virgin-Citroën	157 (−62)
	4	(India) Mahindra	116 (−103)
	5	(United Kingdom) Jaguar	105 (−114)

- Notes: Only the top five positions are included for both sets of standings.

== Notes and references ==
=== References ===
Previous race: 2018 Berlin ePrix	FIA Formula E Championship; 2017–18 season	Next race: 2018 New York City ePrix
Previous race: N/A	Zurich ePrix	Next race: N/A
