= Fathi Derder =

Swiss politician (1970–2025)

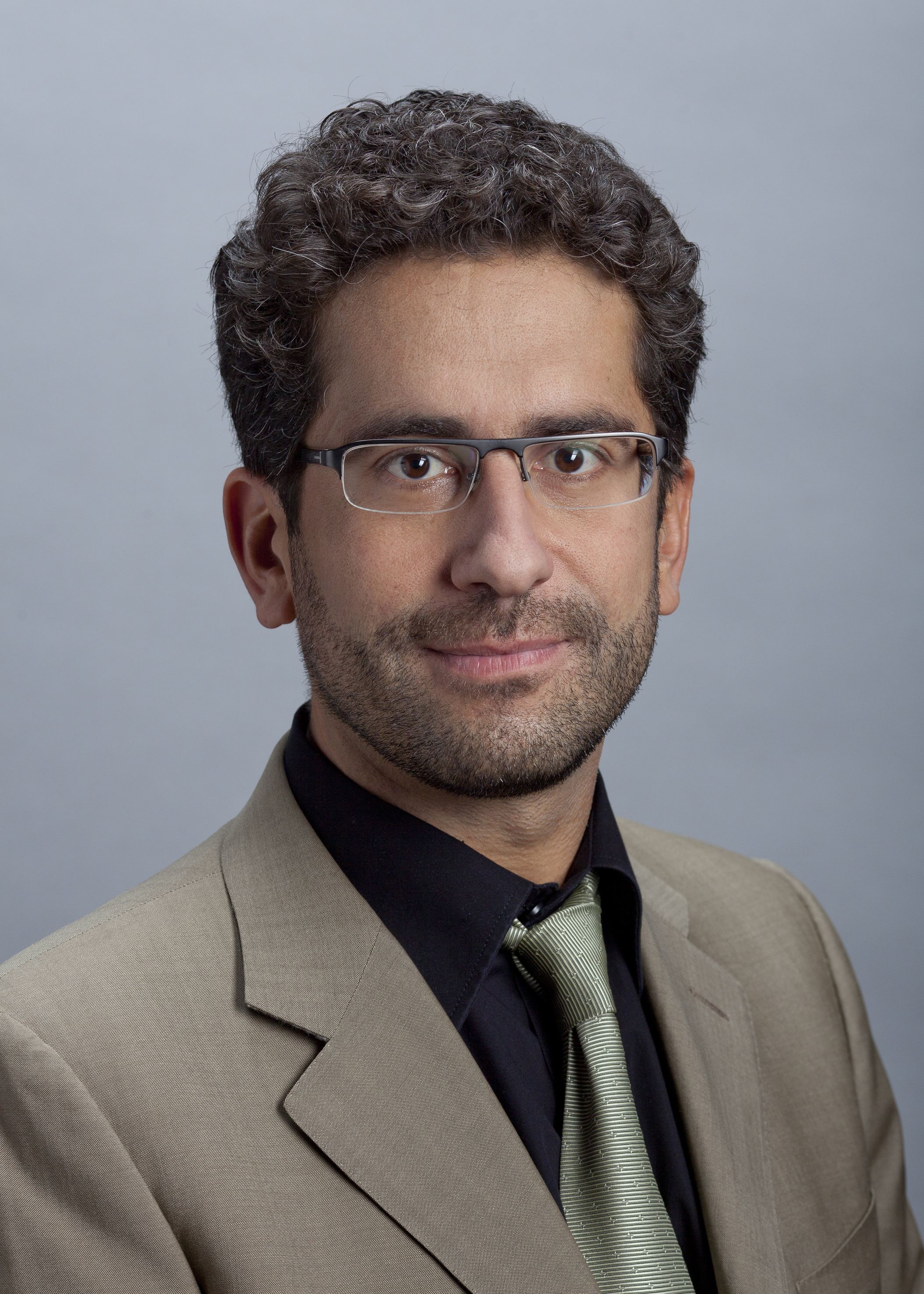

Member of the Swiss National Council
- In office 5 December 2011 – 1 December 2019

Personal details
- Born: 4 December 1970 Lausanne, Switzerland
- Died: 25 January 2025 (aged 54)
- Party: PLR (until 2019)
- Education: University of Lausanne
- Occupation: Journalist

Fathi Derder (4 December 1970 – 25 January 2025) was a Swiss journalist and politician of the Liberal-Radical Party (PLR).

== Life and career ==
=== Early life and family ===
Born in Lausanne on 4 December 1970, Derder had an Algerian father and a Valasian mother. He was a dual national until 2000, when he gave up his Algerian passport over administrative difficulties. He had two brothers. He had four children in total; two with his first wife Isabelle Falconnier, and two with his second wife Mélanie Chappuis.

=== Education and journalistic career ===
Derder studied letters at the University of Lausanne and joined its student radio station, Fréquence Banane. He began his career with the newspaper La Côte before working at Radio Lac and Radio Suisse Romande. In 2008, he was named editor-in-chief of La Télé. From May 2017 to July 2018, he was editor-in-chief of Agefi. In August 2022, he became co-host of the radio show Drôle d'époque. Two months later, he was named president of the Chambre cantonale consultative des immigrés. In November 2022, he succeeded Niniane Paeffgan as director of Swiss Digital Initiative.

=== Political career ===
In 2011, Derder was elected to the National Council, where he joined the Science, Education and Culture Committee. In 2015, he took advantage of the fact that Olivier Français was appointed to the Council of States and was re-elected. In 2018, he announced that he would not seek re-election. In 2019, his term expired and he concurrently resigned from the PLR. At the end of his term, he took a skeptical position of the website Lobbywatch.

=== Death ===
Derder took his life on 25 January 2025, at the age of 54, leaving a suicide note in which he explains having struggled with depression.

== Publications ==
- Le prochain Google sera suisse (à 10 conditions) (2015)
- Les petits secrets du Palais (2019)
