= 2017–18 Formula E Championship =

4th season of ABB FIA Formula E

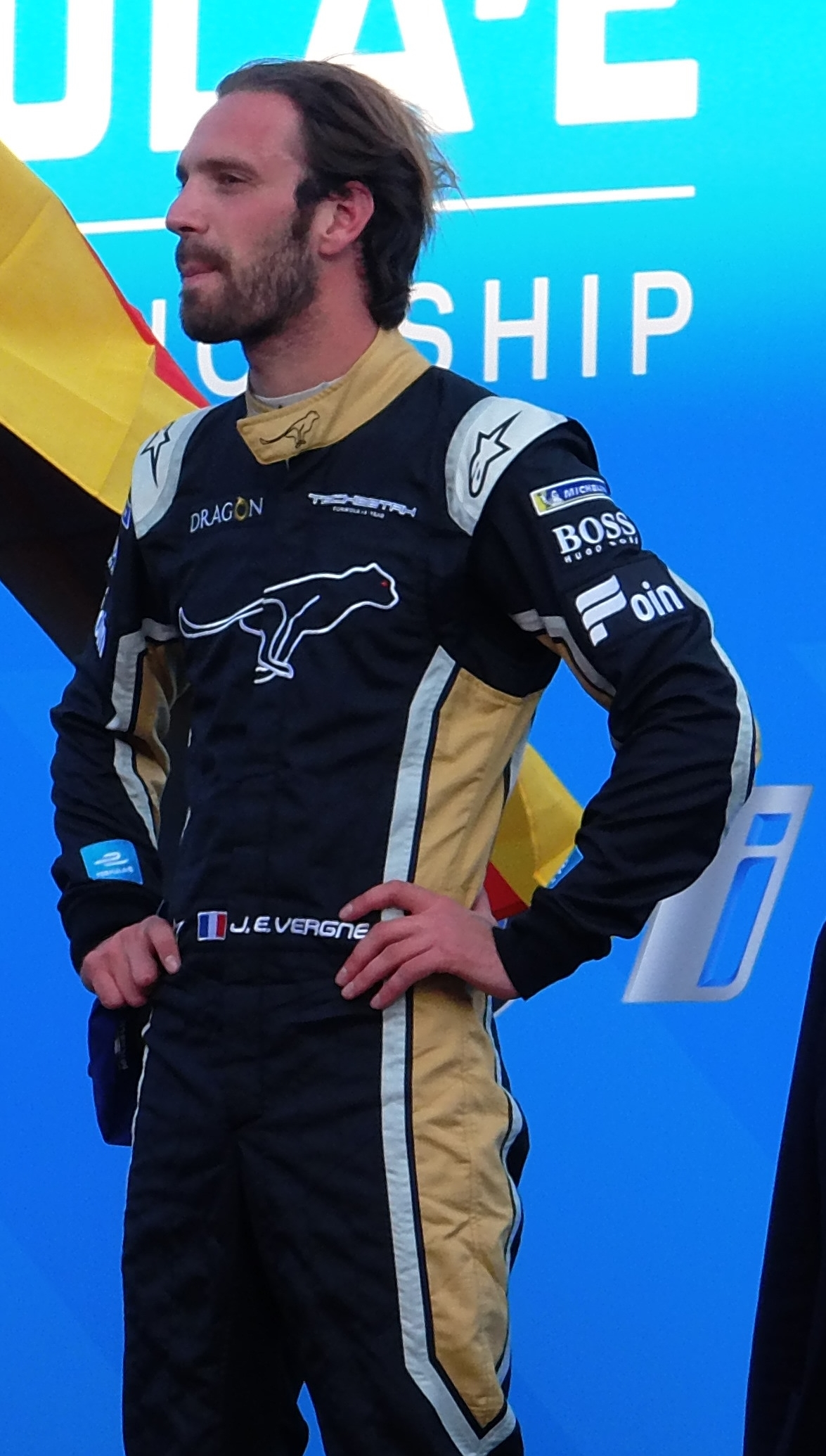
Jean-Éric Vergne, the Drivers' Champion.

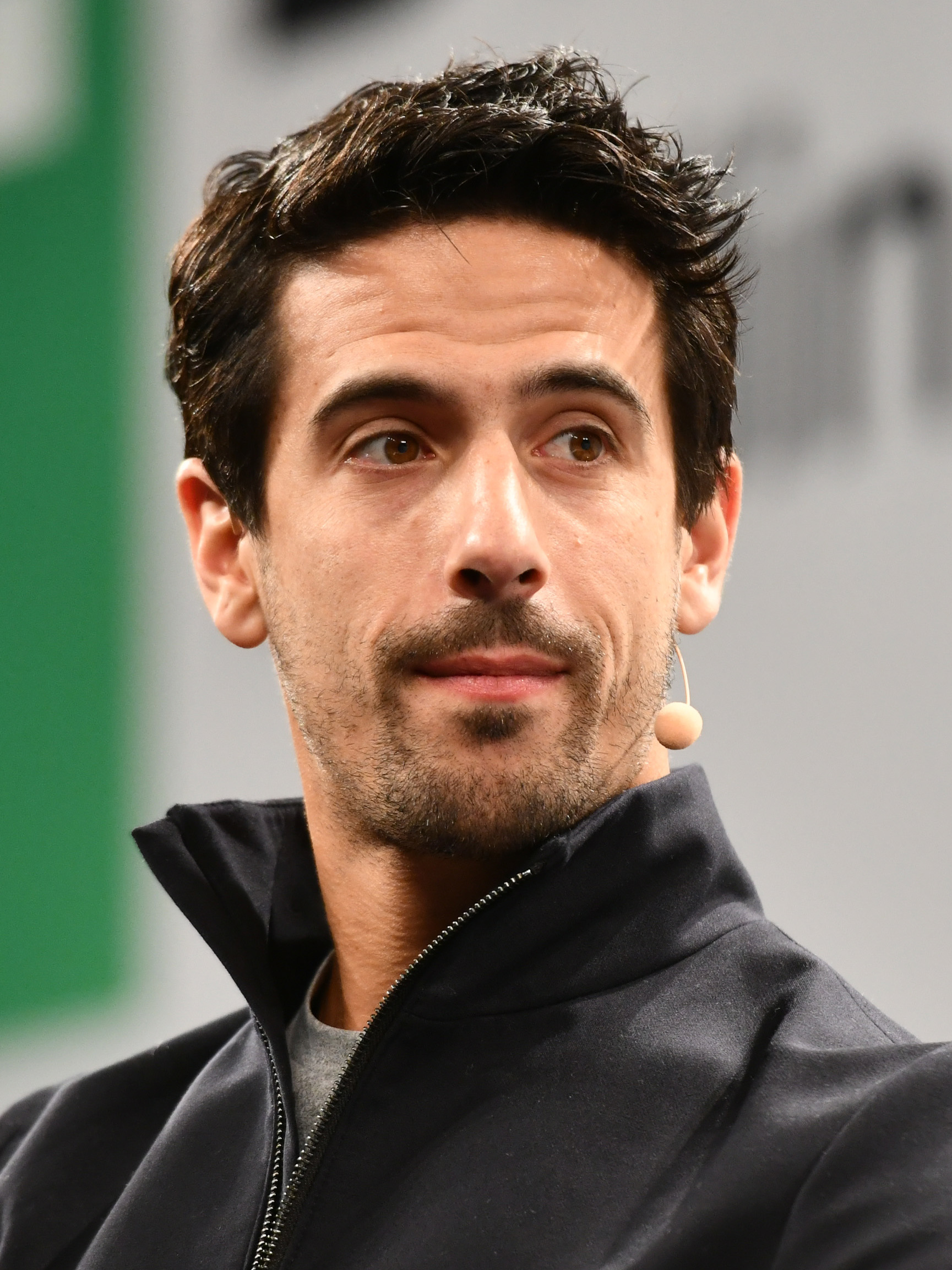
Lucas di Grassi, the runner-up.

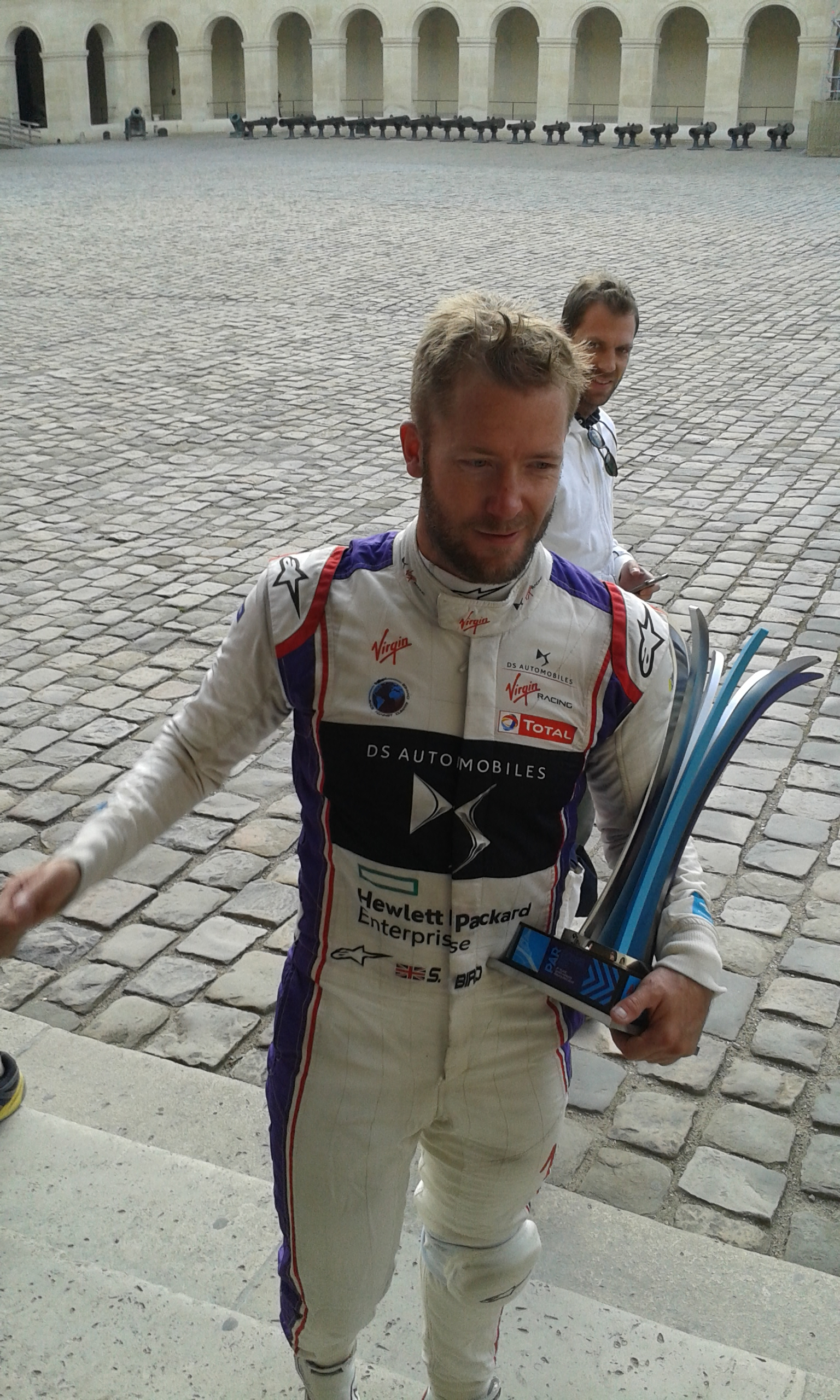
Sam Bird finished the season in third.

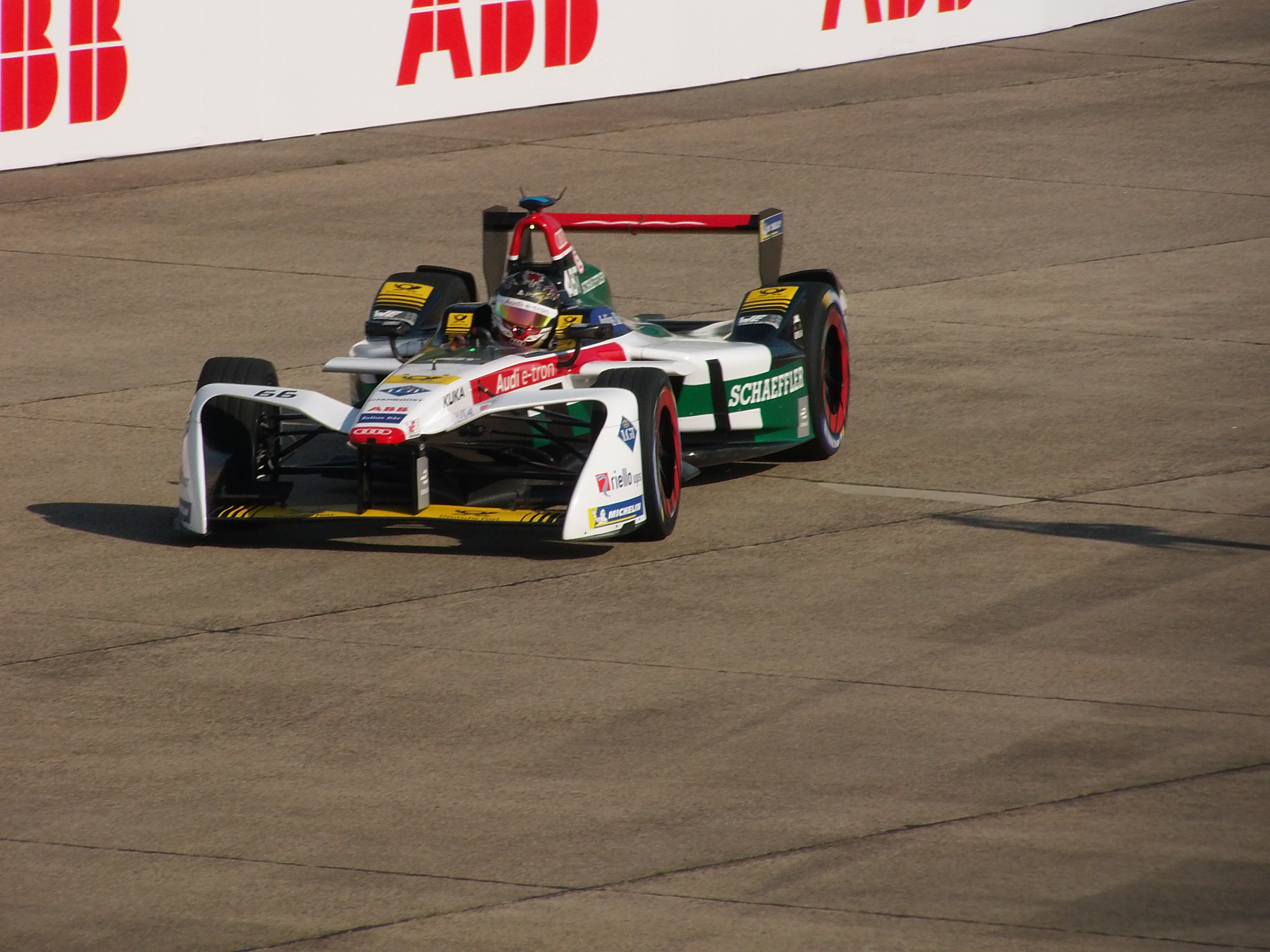
Audi Sport ABT Schaeffler won the Teams' title.

The 2017–18 FIA Formula E Championship (known for commercial reasons as the 2017–18 ABB FIA Formula E Championship) was the fourth season of the Fédération Internationale de l'Automobile (FIA) Formula E motor racing. It featured the 2017–18 ABB FIA Formula E Championship, a motor racing championship for open-wheel electric racing cars, recognised by FIA, the sport's governing body, as the highest class of competition for electrically powered vehicles. Twenty drivers representing ten teams contested twelve ePrix, which started in Hong Kong on 2 December 2017 and ended on 15 July 2018 in New York City as they competed for the Drivers' and Teams' Championships.

2017–18 was the final season that the Spark-Renault SRT 01E chassis—which debuted in the 2014–15 Formula E season—was used in competition; as a brand new chassis package was introduced for the 2018–19 season.

Lucas di Grassi entered as the defending Drivers' Champion after securing his first title at the 2017 Montreal ePrix. Renault e.Dams began the season as the defending Teams' Champion, having clinched its third consecutive accolade at the same event.

Frenchman Jean-Éric Vergne took victory in Drivers' Championship with 198 points, besting Lucas di Grassi and Sam Bird. Audi Sport Abt Schaeffler took victory in the Team's Championship, beating Techeetah by a narrow two point margin.

== Teams and drivers ==
All teams used Spark chassis.

Team	Powertrain	No.	Driver name	Races
(Germany) Audi Sport ABT Schaeffler	Audi e-tron FE04	1	(Brazil) Lucas di Grassi	All
(Germany) Audi Sport ABT Schaeffler	Audi e-tron FE04	66	(Germany) Daniel Abt	All
(United Kingdom) DS Virgin Racing	DS Virgin DSV-03	2	(United Kingdom) Sam Bird	All
(United Kingdom) DS Virgin Racing	DS Virgin DSV-03	36	(United Kingdom) Alex Lynn	All
(United Kingdom) Panasonic Jaguar Racing	Jaguar I-Type 2	3	(Brazil) Nelson Piquet Jr.	All
(United Kingdom) Panasonic Jaguar Racing	Jaguar I-Type 2	20	(New Zealand) Mitch Evans	All
(Monaco) Venturi Formula E Team	Venturi VM200-FE-03	4	(Switzerland) Edoardo Mortara	1–8, 10
(Monaco) Venturi Formula E Team	Venturi VM200-FE-03	4	(France) Tom Dillmann	9, 11–12
(Monaco) Venturi Formula E Team	Venturi VM200-FE-03	5	(Germany) Maro Engel	All
(United States) Dragon Racing	Penske EV-2	6	(Switzerland) Neel Jani	1–2
(United States) Dragon Racing	Penske EV-2	6	(Argentina) José María López	3–12
(United States) Dragon Racing	Penske EV-2	7	(Belgium) Jérôme d'Ambrosio	All
(France) Renault e.Dams	Renault Z.E. 17	8	(France) Nicolas Prost	All
(France) Renault e.Dams	Renault Z.E. 17	9	(Switzerland) Sébastien Buemi	All
(United Kingdom) Nio Formula E Team	NextEV Nio Sport 003	16	(United Kingdom) Oliver Turvey	1–11
(United Kingdom) Nio Formula E Team	NextEV Nio Sport 003	16	(China) Ma Qinghua	12
(United Kingdom) Nio Formula E Team	NextEV Nio Sport 003	68	(Italy) Luca Filippi	1–7, 9–12
(United Kingdom) Nio Formula E Team	NextEV Nio Sport 003	68	(China) Ma Qinghua	8
(China) Techeetah	Renault Z.E. 17	18	(Germany) André Lotterer	All
(China) Techeetah	Renault Z.E. 17	25	(France) Jean-Éric Vergne	All
(India) Mahindra Racing	Mahindra M4Electro	19	(Sweden) Felix Rosenqvist	All
(India) Mahindra Racing	Mahindra M4Electro	23	(Germany) Nick Heidfeld	All
(United States) MS&AD Andretti Formula E	Andretti ATEC-03	27	(Monaco) Kamui Kobayashi (Note: Kobayashi is a Japanese driver who was racing under a Monégasque racing license.)	1–2
(United States) MS&AD Andretti Formula E	Andretti ATEC-03	27	(United Kingdom) Tom Blomqvist	3–8
(United States) MS&AD Andretti Formula E	Andretti ATEC-03	27	(France) Stéphane Sarrazin	9–12
(United States) MS&AD Andretti Formula E	Andretti ATEC-03	28	(Portugal) António Félix da Costa	All

=== Team changes ===
==== Name changes ====
The official entry list for the 2017–18 season contained a number of name changes for the teams. These were:

- Abt Schaeffler Audi Sport became Audi Sport Abt Schaeffler, reflecting increased involvement from Audi.
- Faraday Future Dragon Racing dropped the name Faraday Future from the official name to become Dragon Racing.
- NextEV NIO Formula E was shortened to become NIO Formula E.
- MS Amlin Andretti became MS&AD Andretti Formula E, pending future cooperation with BMW.

=== Driver changes ===
==== Joining Formula E ====
- Former IndyCar and GP2 driver Luca Filippi joins Nio, replacing Nelson Piquet Jr. who moved to Jaguar.
- 2008 A1 Grand Prix champion and 2016 World Endurance Champion Neel Jani joined the series with Dragon Racing replacing Loïc Duval.
- 2014 GP3 Series champion and 2017 12 Hours of Sebring winner Alex Lynn replaces José María López at DS Virgin Racing.
- 2011 Formula Nippon Champion and 2012 World Endurance Champion André Lotterer joins Techeetah replacing Stéphane Sarrazin.
- 2010 Formula 3 Euro Series champion Edoardo Mortara will make his debut in Formula E with Venturi.
- DTM driver Tom Blomqvist was set to replace Robin Frijns at Andretti Autosport but his seat prior the first round was granted to FIA World Endurance Championship and Super Formula Championship driver Kamui Kobayashi.

==== Changing teams ====
- 2014–15 Formula E champion Nelson Piquet Jr. moves to Panasonic Jaguar Racing, replacing Adam Carroll.

==== Mid-season changes ====
After just one weekend in Hong Kong, Dragon Racing driver Neel Jani left the team in order to focus on his upcoming World Endurance Championship campaign. He was replaced by former DS Virgin Racing driver José María López.

For the first weekend in Hong Kong, Kamui Kobayashi was brought by MS&AD Andretti to satisfy sponsors. Tom Blomqvist however, took over that car after and raced it until the Paris round, where he left the team to focus on World Endurance Championship commitments with BMW, he was replaced by Stéphane Sarrazin.

Edoardo Mortara missed Berlin and the finale in New York due to DTM commitments with Mercedes. Mortara was replaced by Tom Dillmann on both occasions.

Ma Qinghua subbed in for Luca Filippi at Nio Formula E Team for the Paris ePrix, to fulfill a contract obligation.

== Rule changes ==
- The maximum power usage during the race was increased from 170 kW to 180 kW.
- A point for the fastest lap will be restricted to drivers finishing in the top 10, ending the incentive for drivers with damaged cars or placed outside points positions to switch cars to get fastest lap with no intent of finishing the race.

== Calendar ==
In May 2017, a provisional calendar for the 2017–18 season was circulated. In September, the full calendar was announced. This calendar included new races in Santiago, São Paulo, Rome and Zürich, the latter of which will mark the first time since 1955 a motorsports circuit race will be held in Switzerland. The Buenos Aires round was discontinued, whilst the Monaco round will not be held due to the Historic Grand Prix of Monaco taking place in 2018. Later that year, on 30 November, it was announced that the São Paulo race would be postponed until 2019, with a race elsewhere to replace it in the schedule. It was later announced that Punta del Este in Uruguay, which had been on the schedule for seasons 1 and 2, would be returning in place of São Paulo. On 18 December 2017, the Montreal ePrix was cancelled due to the Mayor of Montreal citing rising costs to the taxpayer. On 18 January 2018, it was announced the ePrix would not be replaced, thus decreasing the calendar to twelve rounds.

Round	ePrix	Country	Track	Date
1	Hong Kong ePrix Race 1	Hong Kong	Hong Kong Central Harbourfront Circuit	2 December 2017
2	Hong Kong ePrix Race 2	Hong Kong	Hong Kong Central Harbourfront Circuit	3 December 2017
3	Marrakesh ePrix	Morocco	Circuit International Automobile Moulay El Hassan	13 January 2018
4	Santiago ePrix	Chile	Santiago Street Circuit	3 February 2018
5	Mexico City ePrix	Mexico	Autódromo Hermanos Rodríguez	3 March 2018
6	Punta del Este ePrix	Uruguay	Punta del Este Street Circuit	17 March 2018
7	Rome ePrix	Italy	Circuito Cittadino dell'EUR	14 April 2018
8	Paris ePrix	France	Paris Street Circuit	28 April 2018
9	Berlin ePrix	Germany	Tempelhof Airport Street Circuit	19 May 2018
10	Zürich ePrix	Switzerland	Zürich Street Circuit	10 June 2018
11	New York City ePrix Race 1	United States	Brooklyn Street Circuit	14 July 2018
12	New York City ePrix Race 2	United States	Brooklyn Street Circuit	15 July 2018

=== ePrix locations ===
Location of non-European ePrix in season 4.
(ePrix – single race)
(ePrix – double header)
Location of European ePrix in season 4.
(held ePrix)

== Results and standings ==
=== ePrix ===
Round	Race	Pole position	Fastest lap	Winning driver	Winning team	Report
1	Hong Kong	(France) Jean-Éric Vergne	(Belgium) Jérôme d'Ambrosio (Note: Point for Fastest Lap awarded to Daniel Abt as d'Ambrosio did not finish inside the top 10.)	(United Kingdom) Sam Bird	(United Kingdom) DS Virgin Racing	Report
2	Hong Kong	(Sweden) Felix Rosenqvist	(Brazil) Lucas di Grassi (Note: Point for Fastest Lap awarded to Felix Rosenqvist as di Grassi did not finish inside the top 10.)	(Sweden) Felix Rosenqvist (Note: Daniel Abt and Audi Sport Abt Schaeffler were the initial winners but were disqualified for technical infringement.)	(India) Mahindra Racing	Report
3	(Morocco) Marrakesh	(Switzerland) Sébastien Buemi	(Brazil) Nelson Piquet Jr.	(Sweden) Felix Rosenqvist	(India) Mahindra Racing	Report
4	(Chile) Santiago	(France) Jean-Éric Vergne	(United Kingdom) Sam Bird	(France) Jean-Éric Vergne	(China) Techeetah	Report
5	Mexico City	(Sweden) Felix Rosenqvist	(Brazil) Lucas di Grassi	(Germany) Daniel Abt	(Germany) Audi Sport Abt Schaeffler	Report
6	(Uruguay) Punta del Este	(France) Jean-Éric Vergne	(Argentina) José María López	(France) Jean-Éric Vergne	(China) Techeetah	Report
7	(Italy) Rome	(Sweden) Felix Rosenqvist	(Germany) Daniel Abt	(United Kingdom) Sam Bird	(United Kingdom) DS Virgin Racing	Report
8	(France) Paris	(France) Jean-Éric Vergne	(Brazil) Lucas di Grassi	(France) Jean-Éric Vergne	(China) Techeetah	Report
9	(Germany) Berlin	(Germany) Daniel Abt	(Germany) Daniel Abt	(Germany) Daniel Abt	(Germany) Audi Sport Abt Schaeffler	Report
10	(Switzerland) Zürich	(New Zealand) Mitch Evans	(Germany) André Lotterer	(Brazil) Lucas di Grassi	(Germany) Audi Sport Abt Schaeffler	Report
11	(United States) New York City	(Switzerland) Sebastien Buemi	(Sweden) Felix Rosenqvist (Note: Point for Fastest Lap awarded to Daniel Abt as Rosenqvist did not finish inside the top 10.)	(Brazil) Lucas di Grassi	(Germany) Audi Sport Abt Schaeffler	Report
12	(United States) New York City	(Switzerland) Sebastien Buemi	(Germany) Daniel Abt	(France) Jean-Éric Vergne	(China) Techeetah	Report

=== Drivers' Championship standings ===
Points were awarded to the top ten classified finishers in every race, the pole position starter, and the driver who set the fastest lap, using the following structure:

Position	**1st**	**2nd**	**3rd**	**4th**	**5th**	**6th**	**7th**	**8th**	**9th**	**10th**	**Pole**	**FL**
Points	25	18	15	12	10	8	6	4	2	1	3	1

Pos.	Driver	HKG (Hong Kong)		MRK (Morocco)	SCL (Chile)	MEX (Mexico)	PDE (Uruguay)	RME (Italy)	PAR (France)	BER (Germany)	ZUR (Switzerland)	NYC (United States)		Pts
1	(France) Jean-Éric Vergne	**2**	4	5	**1**	5	**1**	5	**1**	3	10	5*	1*	198
2	(Brazil) Lucas di Grassi	17	14	Ret	Ret	9*	2	2*	2*	2	1*	1	2	144
3	(United Kingdom) Sam Bird	1	5	3	5	17	3	1	3	7	2	9	10	143
4	(Switzerland) Sébastien Buemi	11	10	**2***	3*	3*	Ret*	6	5*	4*	5*	**3***	**4***	125
5	(Germany) Daniel Abt	5*	DSQ*	10*	Ret*	1	14*	4*	7*	**1***	13*	2*	3*	120
6	(Sweden) Felix Rosenqvist	14	**1**	1	4	**Ret***	5*	**Ret**	8	11*	15	14	5	96
7	(New Zealand) Mitch Evans	12	3	11	7	6	4	9	15	6	**7**	Ret	6	68
8	(Germany) André Lotterer	DSQ	13	Ret	2	13	12	3	6	9	4	7	9	64
9	(Brazil) Nelson Piquet Jr.	4	12	4	6	4	Ret	Ret	Ret	12	Ret	Ret	7	51
10	(United Kingdom) Oliver Turvey	16	6	Ret	14	2	7	12	9	5	9	WD		46
11	(Germany) Nick Heidfeld	3	16	7	Ret	Ret	Ret	16	11	10	6	6	8	42
12	(Germany) Maro Engel	13	7	12	Ret	16	10	8	4	8	11	8	Ret	31
13	(Switzerland) Edoardo Mortara	7	2	17†	13	8	17	10	13		Ret			29
14	(Belgium) Jérôme d'Ambrosio	Ret	15	15	8	11	9	7	12	19	3	13	Ret	27
15	(Portugal) António Félix da Costa	6	11	14	9	7	11	11	Ret	15	8	11	15	20
16	(United Kingdom) Alex Lynn	8	9	9	Ret	10	6	Ret	14	16	16	Ret	14	17
17	(Argentina) José María López			6	Ret*	12	8	17†	10	18	12	Ret	Ret	14
18	(France) Tom Dillmann									13		4	Ret	12
19	(France) Nicolas Prost	9	8	13	10	Ret	15	14	16	14	Ret	10	11	8
20	(United Kingdom) Tom Blomqvist			8	11	15	16	15	Ret					4
21	(Italy) Luca Filippi	10*	Ret*	16	12	14	13	13*		17	Ret	15	Ret	1
22	(France) Stéphane Sarrazin									20	14	12	12	0
23	(China) Ma Qinghua								17				13	0
24	(Japan) Kamui Kobayashi	15*	17*											0
25	(Switzerland) Neel Jani	18	18											0
Pos.	Driver	HKG (Hong Kong)		MRK (Morocco)	SCL (Chile)	MEX (Mexico)	PDE (Uruguay)	RME (Italy)	PAR (France)	BER (Germany)	ZUR (Switzerland)	NYC (United States)		Pts

Colour	Result
Gold	Winner
Silver	Second place
Bronze	Third place
Green	Points classification
Blue	Non-points classification
Blue	Non-classified finish (NC)
Purple	Retired, not classified (Ret)
Red	Did not qualify (DNQ)
Red	Did not pre-qualify (DNPQ)
Black	Disqualified (DSQ)
White	Did not start (DNS)
White	Withdrew (WD)
White	Race cancelled (C)
Blank	Did not practice (DNP)
Blank	Did not arrive (DNA)
Blank	Excluded (EX)

**Bold** – Pole
Italics – Fastest Lap
* – FanBoost

† – Drivers did not finish the race, but were classified as they completed more than 90% of the race distance.

=== Teams' Championship standings ===
Pos.	Team	No.	HKG (Hong Kong)		MRK (Morocco)	SCL (Chile)	MEX (Mexico)	PDE (Uruguay)	RME (Italy)	PAR (France)	BER (Germany)	ZUR (Switzerland)	NYC (United States)		Pts
1	(Germany) Audi Sport ABT Schaeffler	1	17	14	Ret	Ret	9	2	2	2	2	1	1	2	264
1	(Germany) Audi Sport ABT Schaeffler	66	5	DSQ	10	Ret	1	14	4	7	**1**	13	2	3	264
2	(China) Techeetah	18	DSQ	13	Ret	2	13	12	3	6	9	4	7	9	262
2	(China) Techeetah	25	**2**	4	5	**1**	5	**1**	5	**1**	3	10	5	1	262
3	(United Kingdom) DS Virgin Racing	2	1	5	3	5	Ret	3	1	3	7	2	9	10	160
3	(United Kingdom) DS Virgin Racing	36	8	9	9	Ret	10	6	Ret	14	16	16	Ret	14	160
4	(India) Mahindra Racing	19	14	**1**	1	4	**Ret**	5	**Ret**	8	11	15	14	5	138
4	(India) Mahindra Racing	23	3	16	7	Ret	Ret	Ret	16	11	10	6	6	8	138
5	(France) Renault e.dams	8	9	8	13	10	Ret	15	14	16	14	Ret	10	11	133
5	(France) Renault e.dams	9	11	10	**2**	3	3	Ret	6	5	4	5	**3**	**4**	133
6	(United Kingdom) Panasonic Jaguar Racing	3	4	12	4	6	4	Ret	Ret	Ret	12	Ret	Ret	7	119
6	(United Kingdom) Panasonic Jaguar Racing	20	12	3	11	7	6	4	9	12	6	**7**	Ret	6	119
7	(Monaco) Venturi Formula E Team	4	7	2	17†	13	8	17	10	13	13	Ret	4	Ret	72
7	(Monaco) Venturi Formula E Team	5	13	7	12	Ret	16	10	8	4	8	11	8	Ret	72
8	(United Kingdom) Nio Formula E Team	16	16	6	Ret	14	2	7	12	9	5	9	WD	13	47
8	(United Kingdom) Nio Formula E Team	68	10	Ret	16	12	14	13	13	17	17	Ret	15	Ret	47
9	(United States) Dragon Racing	6	18	18	6	Ret	12	8	17†	10	18	12	Ret	Ret	41
9	(United States) Dragon Racing	7	Ret	15	15	8	11	9	7	12	19	3	13	Ret	41
10	(United States) MS&AD Andretti Formula E	27	15	17	8	11	15	16	15	Ret	20	14	12	12	24
10	(United States) MS&AD Andretti Formula E	28	6	11	14	9	7	11	11	Ret	15	8	11	15	24
Pos.	Team	No.	HKG (Hong Kong)		MRK (Morocco)	SCL (Chile)	MEX (Mexico)	PDE (Uruguay)	RME (Italy)	PAR (France)	BER (Germany)	ZUR (Switzerland)	NYC (United States)		Pts
