= 2018 New York City ePrix =

Race 11 of 12 of the 2017–18 Formula E Championship
← Previous race
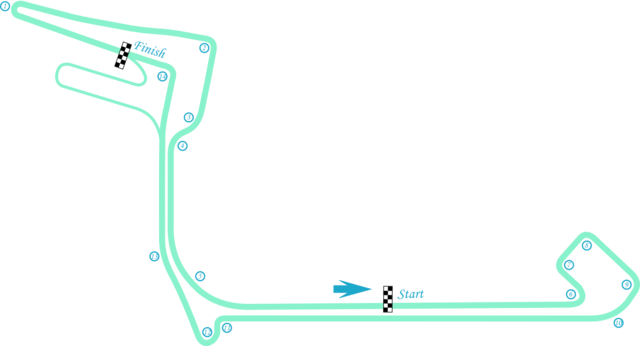

Race details
- Date: 14 July 2018
- Official name: 2018 Qatar Airways New York City E-Prix
- Location: Brooklyn Street Circuit, Red Hook, Brooklyn
- Course: Street circuit
- Course length: 1.475 mi (2.374 km)
- Distance: 43 laps, 63.404 mi (102.039 km)
- Weather: Sunny

Pole position
Driver	(Switzerland) Sébastien Buemi	e.Dams-Renault
- Time: 1:13.911

Fastest lap
Driver	(Sweden) Felix Rosenqvist	Mahindra
- Time: 1:14.663 on lap 42

Podium
First	(Brazil) Lucas di Grassi	Audi
Second	(Germany) Daniel Abt	Audi
Third	(Switzerland) Sébastien Buemi	e.Dams-Renault

The 2018 New York City ePrix (formally the 2018 Qatar Airways New York City E-Prix) were a pair of Formula E electric car races held on July 14 and 15, 2018 at the Brooklyn Street Circuit in Red Hook, Brooklyn. They were the 11th and 12th rounds of the 2017–18 Formula E Championship, and it was the second annual edition of the event. The first race, contested over 43 laps on July 14, was won by Lucas di Grassi of the Audi team after starting 11th. His teammate Daniel Abt finished second, and e.Dams-Renault driver Sébastien Buemi was third. The second race on July 15 also lasted 43 laps, and was won by Techeetah's Jean-Éric Vergne from third. Di Grassi and his teammate were second and third, respectively.

Buemi took the tenth pole position of his career by posting the fastest lap in qualifying and held the lead until Abt passed him on the fifth lap. Di Grassi overtook Buemi for second 15 laps later. Abt maintained the lead through the mandatory pit stops to change into a second car. On lap 24, di Grassi passed Abt for first after his teammate made a driver error. A safety car on lap 35 closed the field up to allow marshals to clear debris after Alex Lynn of Virgin crashed The race restarted with two minutes to go, and di Grassi retained the lead to secure his second consecutive victory, and the eighth of his career.

For the second day running, but on a wet track, Buemi won the pole position with the fastest qualifying lap, the eleventh of his career, but he immediately lost the lead to Vergne at the start. The race was neutralised on lap eight because the Dragon car of José María López needed to be moved after his suspension failed, and for a three car accident on the straight linking turns ten and eleven. Racing resumed four laps later with Vergne leading through the next 12 laps, and the switch into a second vehicle at the halfway point. In the final six laps, Vergne held off di Grassi to take his fourth victory of the season, and the fifth of his career.

The race results won Vergne his first Drivers' Championship after finishing fifth in the first race. Di Grassi's results saw him pass Sam Bird, Vergne's rival entering the event, for second. Buemi maintained fourth, and Abt finished the season in fifth. In the Teams' Championship, Audi outscored Techeetah in both races to win the title by two points. Virgin took third with 160 points. The battle for fourth position was won by Mahindra by five points over e.Dams-Renault in fifth.

== Background ==
The 2018 New York City ePrix double header was confirmed as part of Formula E's 2017–18 series schedule by the FIA World Motor Sport Council in September 2017. They were the 11th and 12th scheduled single-seater electric car races of the 2017–18 Championship, and it was the second annual edition of the event. The races were held at the 14-turn 1.47 mi (2.37 km) Brooklyn Street Circuit in Red Hook, Brooklyn on July 14 and 15. It was the final two races for the Spark-Renault SRT 01E car, which was replaced by the SRT05e from the 2018–19 Championship onward. Renault made its final appearance as a Formula E team and powertrain manufacturer, and were replaced by corporate partner Nissan. Organisers of the ePrix expected 40,000 people to converge to the circuit over the weekend. Formula E arranged a partnership with the New York City Economic Development Corporation to provide organizations in the Red Hook community with a 1,000 race day tickets to give away to local residents for free.

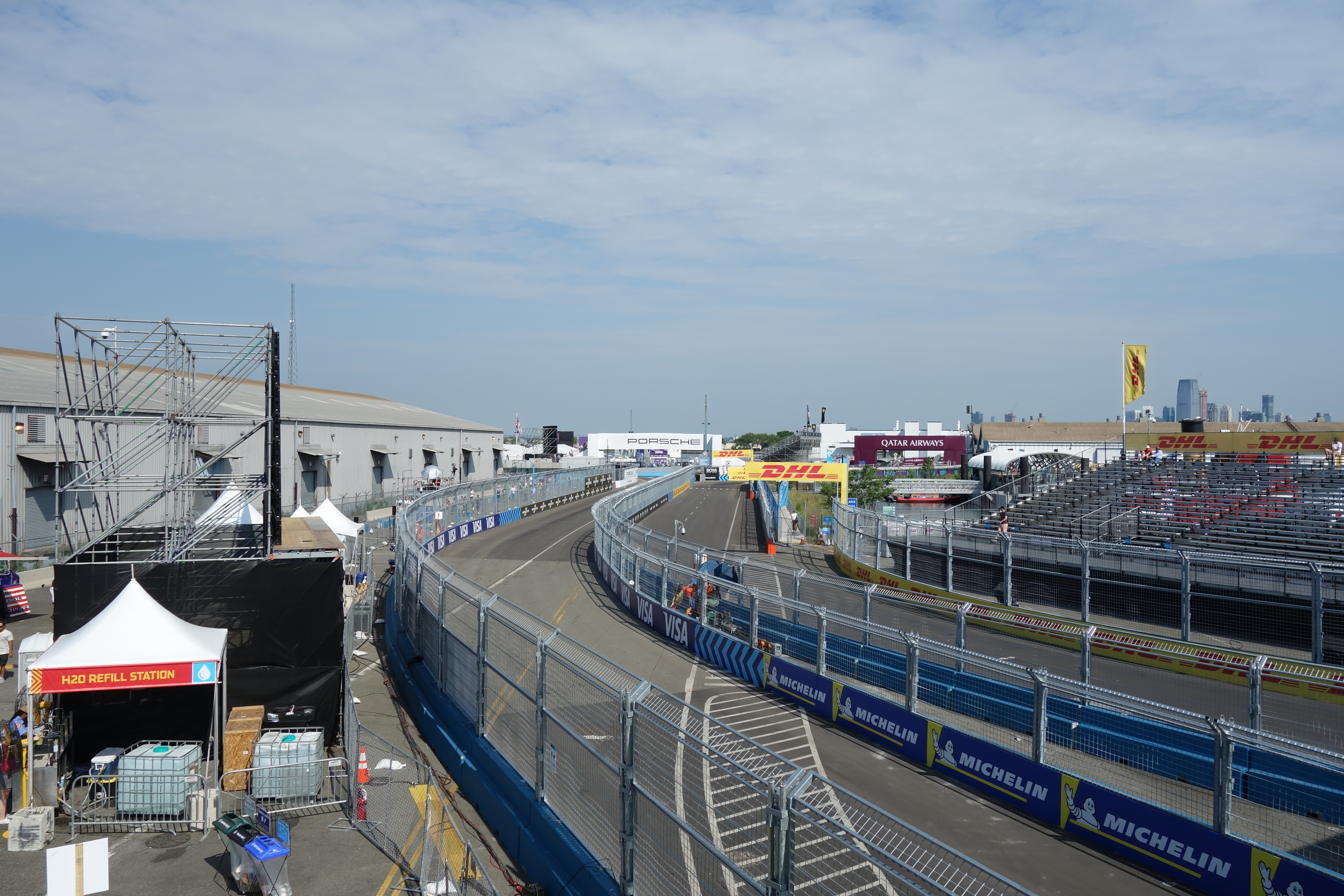
The Brooklyn Street Circuit, where the race was held

Before the race, Jean-Éric Vergne of Techeetah led the Drivers' Championship with 163 points. Virgin's Sam Bird was second with 140 points, and Audi driver Lucas di Grassi was third with 101 points. With 92 points, Sébastien Buemi of e.Dams-Renault was fourth and Mahindra driver Felix Rosenqvist was six points behind in fifth. In the Teams' Championship, Techeetah led with 219 points, 33 ahead of Audi. Virgin were third with 157 points with Mahindra (116 points) and Jaguar (105) fourth and fifth. 58 points were available for the final two races of the season, which meant Vergne could win the Drivers' Championship in the first race if he won and Bird did not earn one point for the fastest lap and three for taking the pole position.

Bird began the season by leading the championship after the 2017 Hong Kong ePrix, and losing it to Vergne after the Santiago ePrix but remained in contention by consistently finishing in the top five over the next seven races. At the preceding Zürich ePrix, Vergne's lead in the Drivers' Championship was lowered from 40 to 23 points after Bird finished second and Vergne tenth. Bird, the winner of both New York City races in 2017, was the underdog for the Drivers' Championship and believed Vergne was under pressure, saying in his situation, he would be anxious of close racing due to car-to-car contact or a driver error causing him to crash, "The thought of him having a bad Saturday must almost keep him awake at night because if that happens and I have a good Saturday he has to deliver the following day." Vergne said Techeetah would not alter its approach and had maximum preparation, "No matter how this weekend goes, we have shown that a customer team can take on the manufacturers and be successful."

The Brooklyn Street Circuit was modified for this round. The track was extended farther north and west to Summit Street and Hamilton Avenue. As opposed to the original right-hand hairpin at the end of the main straight on Bowne Street, a four-turn complex was added featuring a left-hander and three right-hand corners leading to the second straight that formed the previous track configuration. The changes increased the overall length of the circuit by 0.5 km (0.31 mi), and were made to accommodate the more powerful second generation and more downforce efficient Formula E car. Di Grassi opined the elongated track could increase overtaking on the back straight, and create more excitement during the races. Bird however stated the alterations would hinder his team as its car was less energy efficient than others, and the flowing corners would not help him.

There was one change of driver for the weekend. Venturi driver Edoardo Mortara had a Deutsche Tourenwagen Masters commitment for Mercedes-Benz at the Circuit Zandvoort due to his championship position of second in that series. He was replaced by the team's test and reserve driver Tom Dillmann. This was the second time in the season Dillmann replaced Mortara with the first at the Berlin ePrix two months prior and had driven for Venturi seven times in the 2016–17 Championship. Venturi's request to switch competitors was granted by the stewards through bypassing a series regulation stating any changes of driver in the final three races of the season was forbidden except in unforeseen circumstances such as the suspension of an e-licence.

== Race one ==
=== Practice and qualifying ===
Two practice sessions—both on Saturday morning—were held before the late afternoon race. The first session was scheduled to run for 45 minutes and the second lasted half an hour. An untimed half hour shakedown session was held late Friday afternoon to allow teams to check the reliability of their cars and electronic systems. Although no major accidents were reported during the session, Buemi crashed into the wall, but he escaped with minor damage to his car.

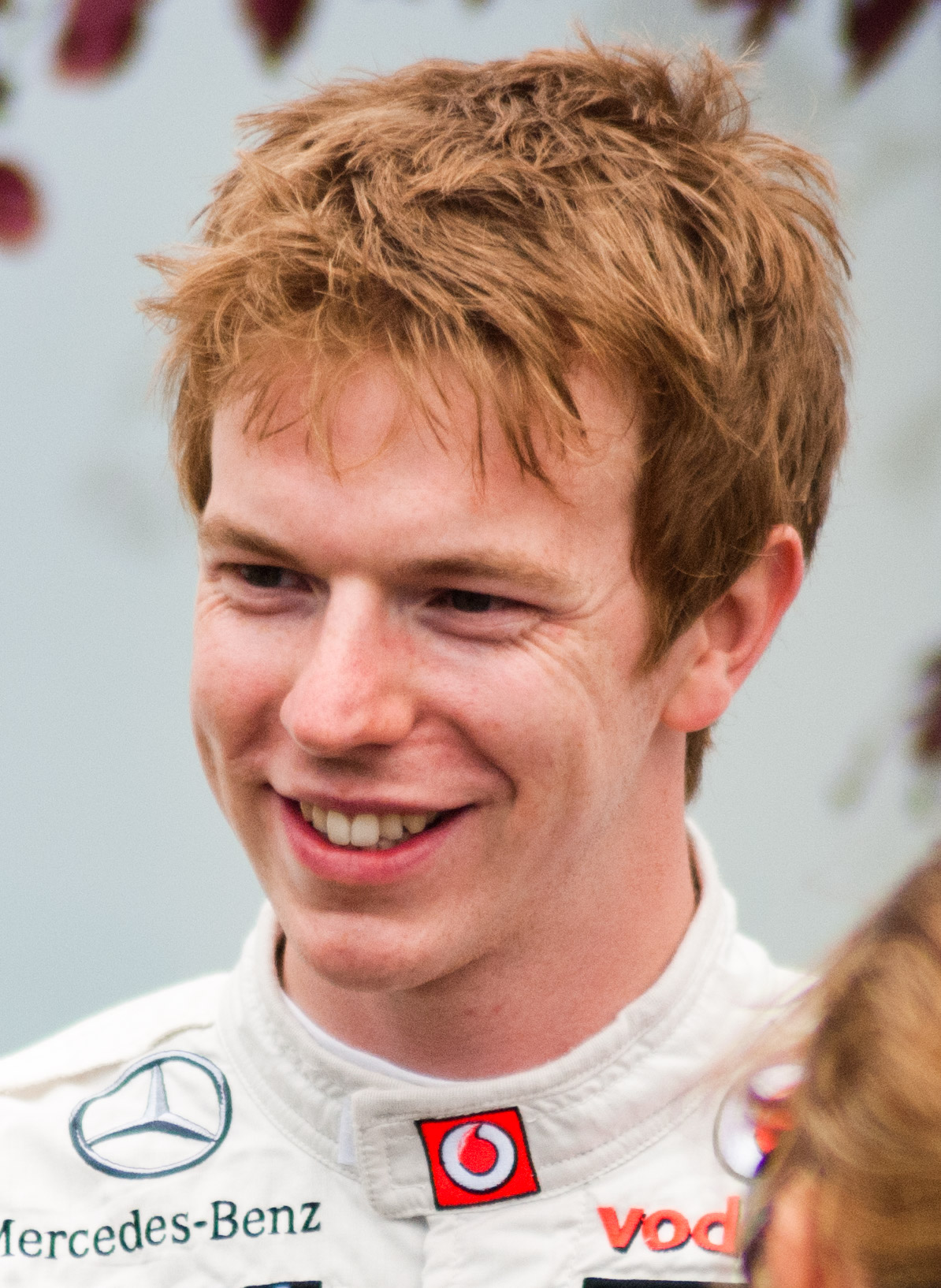
Oliver Turvey (pictured in 2012) withdrew from the race because he fractured the fifth metacarpal bone on his left hand in a heavy crash during second practice.

In the first practice session, held in warm and dusty conditions, di Grassi was fastest with a 1-minute and 13.566 seconds lap he set with 200 kW (270 hp) of power late on. Buemi was 0.350 seconds slower in second. Jaguar's Mitch Evans, Vergne, Daniel Abt of Audi, Bird, Dragon driver José María López, NIO's Oliver Turvey, Alex Lynn for Virgin and Techeetah's André Lotterer occupied positions three through ten. Nick Heidfeld for Mahindra made the track impassible after hitting the turn 11 chicane exit kerb. He went straight into the wall beside the circuit with Abt close by. The session was red flagged for three minutes while the field dispersed. Seven minutes later, López sheared his right-rear suspension over the turn 12 kerb. A second stoppage was needed when López lost the ability to drive, after stopping at pit lane entrance. The session was extended by ten minutes to allow drivers to better familiarise themselves with the track. A yellow flag was waved for Nelson Piquet Jr.'s Jaguar which stopped at the turn twelve exit, and Maro Engel lightly damaged his Venturi car in a collision with the turn two tire barrier.

In the second half hour practice session, most teams used the opportunity to simulate their qualifying laps at 200 kW (270 hp) of power, as several drivers had to scythe their way past traffic on the narrow circuit, and dust off the racing line reduced visibility. Rosenqvist recorded a benchmark time that Buemi bettered, and Stéphane Sarrazin bent the right-rear suspension on his Andretti at the wall in the turn seven left-hander. Di Grassi began his maximum power lap when he grazed the barrier at the turn two 90-degree right-hander with the right-rear of his car, and he entered the pit lane for repairs. Dragon's Jérôme d'Ambrosio led until Evans went fastest with a time of 1 minute and 13.207 seconds with two minutes remaining. D'Ambrosio, Bird, López, Buemi, Nico Prost of e.Dams-Renault, António Félix da Costa of Andretti, Turvey, and the Audis of Abt and di Grassi completed the top ten ahead of qualifying. After second practice, Turvey was transported to the trackside medical center, and then to a hospital in Brooklyn, because he fractured the fifth metacarpal bone on his left hand; he lost control of his car while on a maximum power lap, and collided with the outside barrier at the turn 14 left-hander, causing him to miss qualifying.

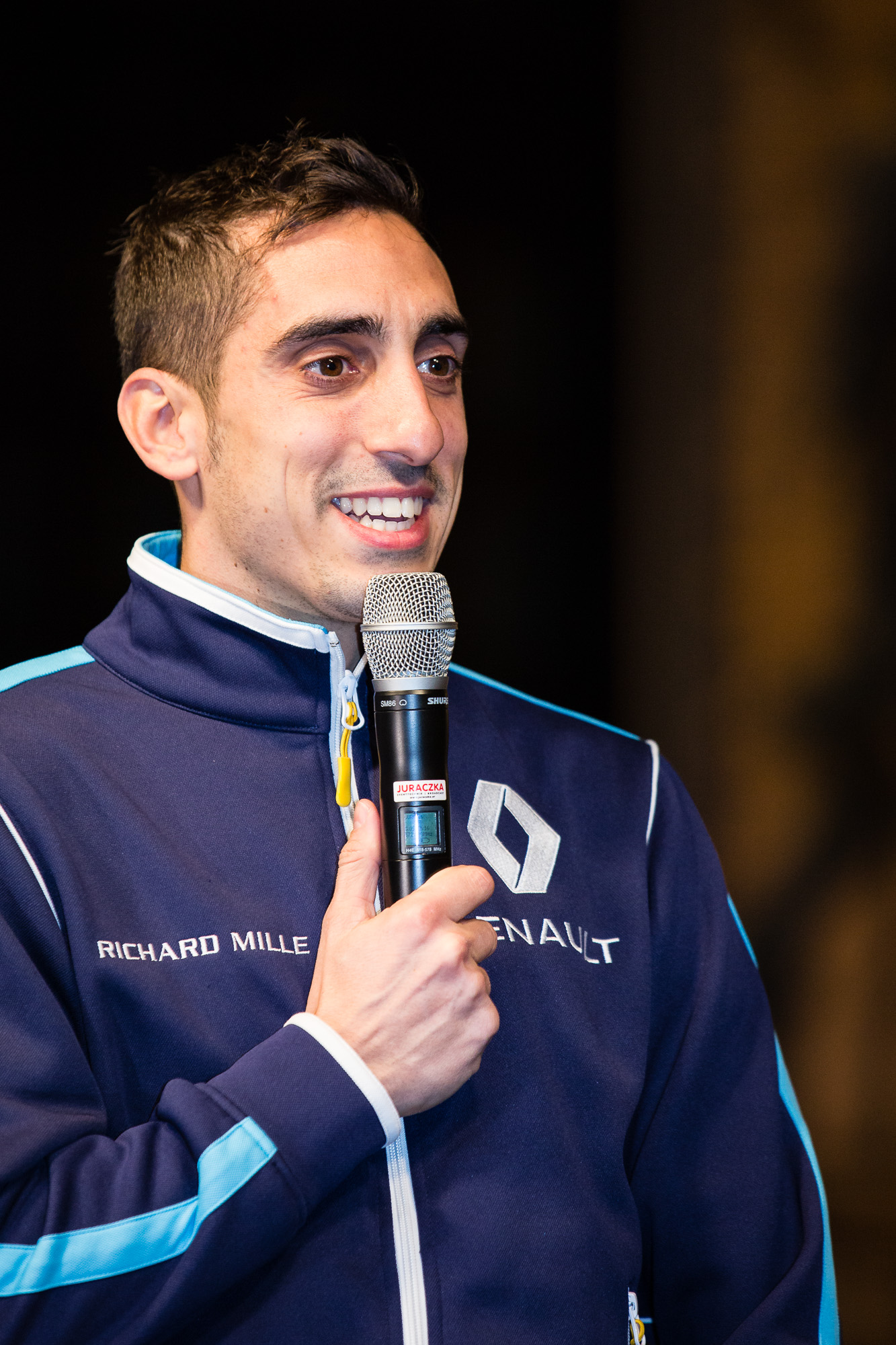
Sébastien Buemi (pictured in 2016) took the pole position for the race on Saturday and repeated the feat on Sunday.

Saturday's afternoon qualifying session ran for an hour and was divided into four groups of five cars. Each group was determined by a lottery system and was permitted six minutes of on-track activity. All drivers were limited to two timed laps with one at maximum power. The fastest five overall competitors in the four groups participated in a "super pole" session with one driver on the track at any time going out in reverse order from fifth to first. Each of the five drivers was limited to one timed lap and the starting order was determined by the competitor's fastest times (super pole from first to fifth, and group qualifying from sixth to twentieth). The driver and team who recorded the fastest time were awarded three points towards their respective championships. In the first group, Vergne narrowly avoided a collision with Buemi, but he was the early pace setter with a provisional fastest lap of any driver in all four groups at 1 minute and 13.890 seconds. Buemi and di Grassi were provisionally second and third. Bird and Rosenqvist were group one's slowest two drivers. Lotterer was provisionally group two's fastest competitor. Abt and the Jaguar duo of Evans and Piquet were second to fourth. The absent Turvey was unclassified because of his withdrawal. At the conclusion of the second group, it was announced that the Techeetahs of Vergne and Lotterer were under investigation for a possible overuse of power. In group three, d'Ambrosio was fastest and he demoted Buemi from super pole contention. Positions two through five were made up by Engel, Heidfeld, Félix da Costa and Lynn.

During the fourth group, Vergne and his teammate Lotterer had their lap times in group qualifying nullified because they were confirmed to have overused the maximum amount of allocated power. This was related to a software glitch affecting a section of updated code that improved reliability to a control system that regulates power usage. Prost set group four's fastest lap, followed by López, Dillmann and NIO's Luca Filippi. Sarrazin was the slowest driver to set a lap time in group qualifying after he slid sideways into the barrier lining the circuit at turn eleven; race control did not halt the session because he continued driving. At the end of group qualifying, the lap times set by Abt, Evans, d'Ambrosio, Buemi and Prost progressed them to super pole. Buemi took his second pole position of the season, and the tenth of his career with a time of 1 minute and 13.911 seconds. He was joined on the grid's front row by Evans who was 0.554 seconds slower as a consequence of him sliding wide at turn five. Prost qualified in third place, and d'Ambrosio started from fourth after a driver error at turn six. Abt made a mistake at turn seven and he began from fifth. The rest of the grid lined up as Piquet, López, Engel, Dillmann, Heidfeld, di Grassi, Félix da Costa, Lynn, Bird, Filippi, Rosenqvist, Sarrazin, Vergne and Lotterer. After qualifying, Turvey was withdrawn on medical grounds, and he was replaced by NIO's test and reserve driver Ma Qinghua for the Sunday race through the application of force majeure.

=== Race ===
The first 43-lap race began at 15:33 Eastern Daylight Time (UTC−05:00) on July 14. The weatherat the start were dry and clear with the air temperature between 31.6 to 32.1 °C (88.9 to 89.8 °F) and the track temperature was from 43.25 to 45 °C (109.85 to 113.00 °F). A special feature of Formula E is the "FanBoost" feature, an additional 100 kilowatts (130 hp) of power to use in the driver's second car. The three drivers who were allowed to use the boost were determined by a fan vote. For the first New York City race, Abt, Buemi and Vergne were handed the extra power. Evans moved only a few metres from his starting slot due to a broken driveshaft, as Buemi maintained the lead going into the first corner with his teammate Prost in second and Abt third. D'Ambrosio swerved to avoid striking Evans' car, and that allowed his teammate López to draw alongside him on the run to the first turn. This resulted in López removing his front wing when he hit the rear of d'Ambrosio's vehicle, knocking his teammate's rear wing off. As both Dragon drivers delayed the field, Lynn passed Félix da Costa on the inside line, while Vergne dropped to the rear so he could conserve electrical energy. Abt passed Prost for second around the inside heading towards turn six, as Bird moved into tenth with a pass on d'Ambrosio.

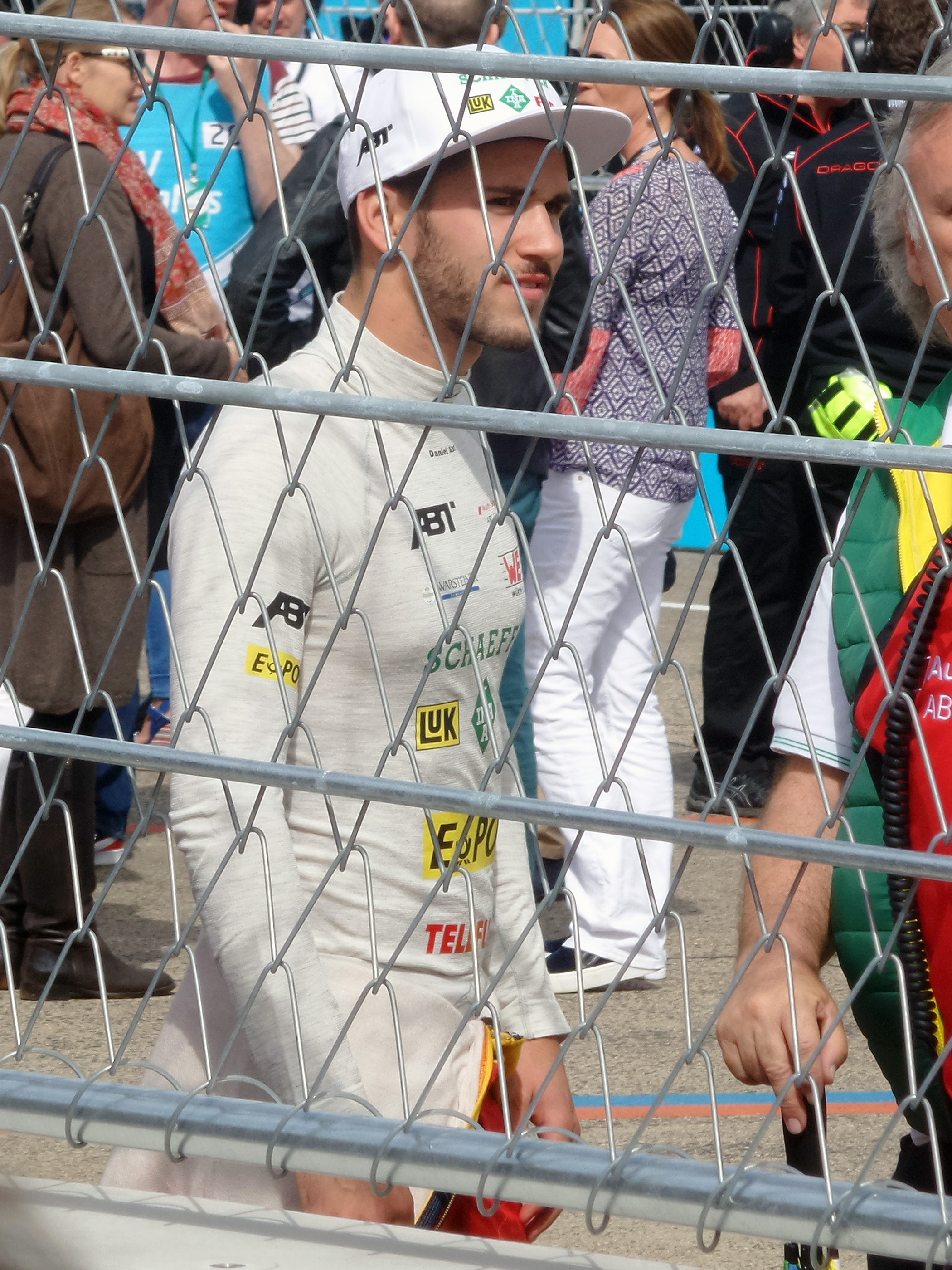
Daniel Abt (pictured in 2015) finished second but he was unhappy with the position because of perceived team orders that were later disproved.

Coming to the conclusion of the first lap, Buemi led Abt, Prost, the fast-starting Piquet and Dillmann as López entered the pit lane for a replacement rear wing. Prost lost third and fourth to Piquet and Dillmann on the second lap, as Lynn allowed his teammate Bird through into tenth. At the conclusion of lap three, d'Ambrosio drove into the pit lane to have a new nose cone fitted to his car. On lap five, di Grassi overtook Engel around the outside for sixth going into the turn eleven chicane as the Techeetahs of Lotterer and Vergne began to move up the field. At the front of the pack, Buemi came under pressure from Abt with the latter plotting where to execute an overtaking manoeuvre. During the sixth lap, Abt steered left to the inside of Buemi at the end of the straight going into the turn eleven chicane to pass him for the lead. Elsewhere, Dillmann overtook Piquet into the same corner for third on the next lap. On the 11th lap, Rosenqvist went to the outside of Félix da Costa, and forced him wide at turn one for 12th. This allowed Vergne to pass Félix da Costa on the inside for 13th going into turn two, and out-braked Rosenqvist on the entry to turn seven for 12th.

That same lap, Lotterer overtook Bird for tenth driving into the turn eleven chicane. Lotterer then delayed Bird enough to allow Vergne to draw closer. Vergne got ahead of Lynn around the outside on the approach to the turn 11 chicane on lap 13. Di Grassi lapped faster than anybody and he overtook Dillmann on the outside for third into the same corner two laps later. Lotterer moved marginally farther away from Bird to provide his teammate Vergne with an opportunity to pass. This came on lap 16 as Vergne passed Bird on the inside into turn six for tenth. On lap 17, Lotterer passed Engel for eighth. A lap later, Heidfeld overtook Prost on the back straight to move into sixth. Di Grassi caught and passed Buemi into turn six for second on the 20th lap. Prost lost seventh to Lotterer on the next lap. In the meantime, Bird returned to the top ten by passing Engel on the main straight. At the end of lap 22, the field except for Sarrazin made their mandatory pit stops to change into a second car. Rosenqvist stopped in the pit lane's center to avoid colliding with his teammate Heidfeld; drivers scrambled for space to avoid hitting him. (Note: Mahindra were fined €2500 for releasing Nick Heidfeld in an unsafe manner.)

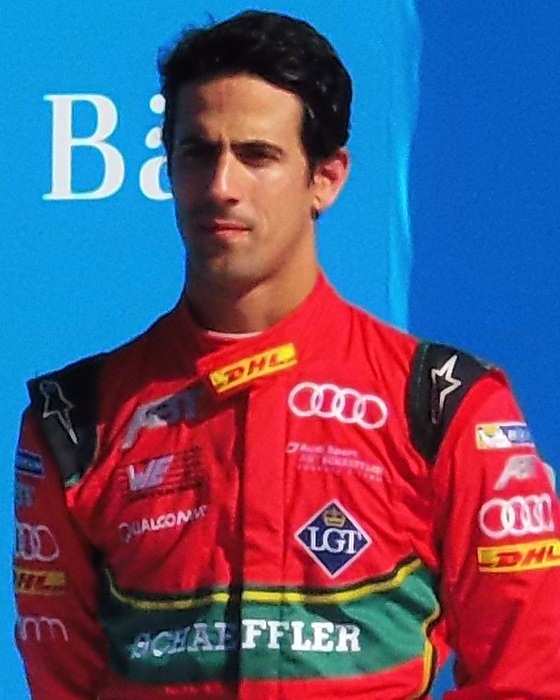
Lucas di Grassi (pictured in 2017) won his second victory in a row and the eighth of his career.

After the pit stops, Abt still led but di Grassi reduced the gap due to a faster car switch. Dillmann lost fourth to Piquet but he regained the position after Piquet stopped exiting the pit lane because he inadvertently switched his car off and lost positions. On lap 24, di Grassi began to challenge his teammate Abt for first. Abt ran wide leaving turn seven, and di Grassi nudged the rear of his teammate's car. Di Grassi turned to the outside to pass Abt for first into the turn 11 chicane with an aggressive overtake that saw them make minor contact in the braking zone. He sought a way back past going into turn six on the next lap but di Grassi repelled the manoeuvre. Both Audi drivers were given the instruction Code 100, which was surmised as a potential team order to hold position. On the 29th lap, Techeetah instructed Lotterer to allow his teammate Vergne past into turn six. However, as Engel overtook Bird on the inside for tenth on lap 35, Lynn lost control of his car's rear, and struck the turn five outside wall .

Although Lynn was uninjured and clambered out of his vehicle, the full course yellow procedure, and then the safety car was deployed to close the field up, and allow marshals to clean the track clearing and repair the barriers. The race was restarted with two minutes left as it switched to a timed event. Heidfeld overtook Lotterer for sixth and challenged Vergne for fifth. Engel overtook Prost for eighth, and Bird followed through for ninth. On the final lap, Filippi entered the pit lane to retire for unknown reasons. Abt also set the fastest lap in the top ten at 1 minute and 15.082 seconds to earn one championship point. (Note: Felix Rosenqvist set the overall fastest lap at one minute and 14.663 seconds on lap 42, but the one championship point for the award was given to Daniel Abt because Rosenqvist did not finish within the top ten.) Di Grassi crossed the finish line to take his second victory in a row after the race in Zürich a month prior, and the eighth of his career. Abt was 0.965 seconds behind in second, and Buemi completed the podium in third. Off the podium, Dillmann took a season best result of fourth. Vergne finished fifth to claim the Drivers' Championship as Bird could not catch his points total with a race to go. The final finishers were Heidfeld, Lotterer, Engel, Bird, Prost, Félix da Costa, Sarrazin, d'Ambrosio, Rosenqvist and Fillippi.

=== Post-race ===
The top three drivers appeared on the podium to collect their trophies and spoke to the media in a later press conference. Di Grassi praised the speed of his car, his on-track battles and said having a large lead in Formula E was nonsensical because of a disruption such as the deployment of the safety car meaning a driver had wasted electrical energy in pulling away from the rest of the field. Abt stated he was unsure if there was an inter-team miscommunication over di Grassi passing him, "I'm happy for Audi – the team deserves this but of course I can't sit here and smile like crazy.” Third-placed Buemi revealed that he did not challenge di Grassi for electrical energy management purposes and focused on his own performance after brake and battery temperature issues, "In the end, I didn't have the pace and they were stronger. Still, there's one more race to go and then I have to work on next year as clearly in terms of efficiency they [Audi] were in a different league today, so I'm happy to be the best of the rest.”

On his way back to the pit lane, Vergne dedicated his first motor racing Drivers' Championship since the 2010 British Formula 3 International Series to his friend and fellow racing driver Jules Bianchi, who died nine months after sustaining severe head injuries in an accident at the 2014 Japanese Grand Prix. During the celebration, Vergne said he was happy to win the championship but that he could not celebrate the achievement until the end of the second race because he needed to focus on that event. Although Bird congratulated Vergne on the title, he bemoaned his powertrain's lack of energy efficiency on a longer circuit and the extra distance covered by drivers than had been observed in 2017, "we're still very proud of what we've achieved and the whole team has done an amazing job to put us in this position."

Regarding Audi's inter-team battle, Abt was unhappy over the situation and spoke of his belief that di Grassi disobeyed a team order to hold position after his teammate passed him. He urged Audi to hold internal discussions about the practice, "I don't care if team orders are imposed, but if they are they need to be respected, and today they have not been respected. That's why I'm unhappy." Di Grassi insisted he had received no team orders until after the battle, "There was no call. There was no call until the end of the first third of the second stint, when we had to save energy. That was it." Allan McNish, team principal of Audi, clarified that no instructions had been given, and revealed the decision to end the inter-team battle was made because of the potential threat from the Techeetahs in the event the safety car was dispatched. He later stated that both di Grassi and Abt were allowed to race each other unless certain circumstances prompted a strategy change, "Opinions can differ of course like they did in New York a little, but we should a day later that it was water under the bridge and we got the job done. Therefore our overall strategy of allowing them to race, within reason, will remain."

The result of the ePrix meant Vergne's fifth-place finish won him his maiden Drivers' Championship with a 31-point lead over his nearest rival Bird. Di Grassi's victory enabled him to maintain the third position but he drew to within 16 points of Bird in the battle for second. Buemi was still in fourth, and Abt's second-place finish advanced him from sixth to fifth. Although the Drivers' Championship had been decided, the Teams' Championship had not. Techeetah continued to lead with 235 points, but Audi's one-two finish meant the manufacturer was now just five points adrift in second place. Virgin maintained third with 159 points. Mahindra (124 points) and e.Dams-Renault (118) contended for fifth with a round to go.

=== Standings after the race ===
Drivers' Championship standings

+/–	Pos	Driver	Points
	1	(France) Jean-Éric Vergne	173
	2	(United Kingdom) Sam Bird	142 (−31)
	3	(Brazil) Lucas di Grassi	126 (−47)
	4	(Switzerland) Sébastien Buemi	110 (−63)
1	5	(Germany) Daniel Abt	104 (−69)

Teams' Championship standings

+/–	Pos	Constructor	Points
	1	(China) Techeetah-Renault	235
	2	(Germany) Audi	230 (−5)
	3	(United Kingdom) Virgin-Citroën	159 (−76)
	4	(India) Mahindra	124 (−111)
1	5	(France) e.Dams-Renault	118 (−117)

- Notes: Only the top five positions are included for both sets of standings.

== Race two ==
2018 New York City ePrix
Race 12 of 12 of the 2017–18 Formula E Championship
← Previous race
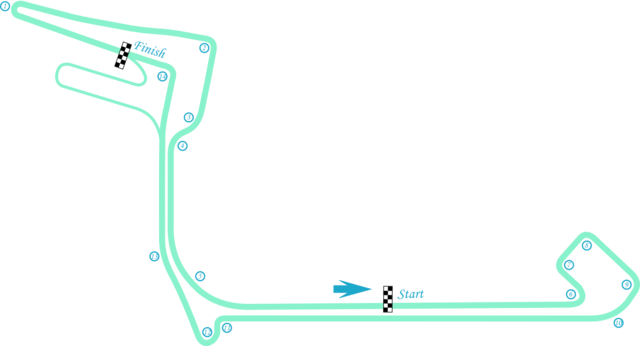

Race details
- Date: 15 July 2018
- Official name: 2018 Qatar Airways New York City E-Prix
- Location: Brooklyn Street Circuit, Red Hook, Brooklyn
- Course: Street circuit
- Course length: 1.475 mi (2.374 km)
- Distance: 43 laps, 63.404 mi (102.039 km)
- Weather: Sunny

Pole position
Driver	(Switzerland) Sébastien Buemi	e.Dams-Renault
- Time: 1:17.973

Fastest lap
Driver	(Germany) Daniel Abt	Audi
- Time: 1:15.552 on lap 15

Podium
First	(France) Jean-Éric Vergne	Techeetah-Renault
Second	(Brazil) Lucas di Grassi	Audi
Third	(Germany) Daniel Abt	Audi

=== Practice and qualifying ===
One 45-minute practice session on Sunday morning was held before the early afternoon race. Overnight rain saturated the track, and it recommenced just before the start of the third practice session, causing several drivers to aquaplane on standing water, as they all ran on the standardised all-weather tires. Abt set the fastest lap 15 minutes in with a time of 1 minute and 18.699 seconds before weather conditions deteriorated. He was followed by Evans, Félix da Costa, Buemi, di Grassi, Sarrazin, Lotterer, Vergne, Rosenqvist, and Bird. López pirouetted through 360 degrees at turn seven but avoided hitting the wall. Bird lost traction under braking, and broke his right-rear suspension in an impact with the outside barrier at the turn eleven chicane after 15 minutes. He drove his car back to the pit lane for repairs. Rosenqvist locked his tyres, and he removed the front wing from his car in a head-on collision with the TecPro wall at the same corner as Bird in practice's final ten minutes. He extricated himself from the wall, and drove to the pit lane for a replacement nose cone.

Sunday's qualifying session was held in the morning rather than the customary time of the beginning of the afternoon. In the first group, held on a damp racing surface, Sarrazin set the early pace, ahead of Dillmann (who ran deep on the run into the first corner), Filippi, and Prost. Ma was group one's slowest competitor after he crashed into the wall at the exit of turn 14 as he began his maximum power lap, damaging the right-rear suspension. Di Grassi set the fastest overall time of any driver in group qualifying with a 1-minute and 17.867 seconds lap. Buemi was 0.272 seconds slower in second. The second group's slowest three drivers were Abt, Vergne, and Bird. As more rain fell, López was fastest in group three, followed by his teammate d'Ambrosio, Engel, and Lynn. Félix da Costa did not set a quick lap because of a battery management system failure on his car while on an out-lap. He began from the rear of the field. In group four, rain continued to fall as Lotterer went fastest, with the Jaguars of Evans and Piquet second and third after Piquet broke the steering arm of his car on the barrier leaving turn one. The Mahindras of Rosenqvist and Heidfeld were the fourth group's two slowest competitors. At the conclusion of group qualifying, di Grassi, Buemi, Lotterer, Abt and Vergne's lap times advanced them to super pole. Buemi was circumspect en route to his second consecutive pole position, and the eleventh of his career with a lap of 1 minute and 17.973 seconds. He was joined on the grid's front row by Lotterer, and his teammate Vergne qualified in third after he glanced the barrier on the entry to turn five, losing more time in the track's final sector. Abt lost time in the opening two sectors but a quick third sector placed him fourth. Fifth-placed di Grassi slowed to pass through standing water and oversteered into the turn two outside TecPro barrier with the right-rear of his car. After qualifying, Lynn and Félix da Costa were penalised ten places on the starting grid for changing their gearboxes. The rest of the grid lined up after penalties as Evans, Piquet, Bird, Rosenqvist, Sarrazin, López, d'Ambrosio, Heidfeld, Dillmann, Filippi, Prost, Engel, Ma, Lynn, and Félix da Costa.

=== Race ===
The second 43-lap race commenced at 15:03 local time on July 15. A few hours beforehand, the event was temporarily suspended because of a lightning storm that was due to pass through Red Hook, and race organisers ordered a full evacuation of the track. The storm subsided an hour later, and the race began on schedule. The air temperature was between 26.7 and 27.85 °C (80.06 and 82.13 °F) and the track temperature ranged from 28.85 to 30.6 °C (83.93 to 87.08 °F). When the five red lights went out to begin the ePrix, Buemi made a slow start and turned left to block Lotterer's path. That allowed the fast-starting Vergne to go to the inside of Buemi and out-brake him for take the lead before the first corner. Abt fell to seventh when Piquet and Rosenqvist passed him into the turn 11 chicane. However, Abt returned to sixth by passing Rosenqvist, as Lynn went entered pit lane to serve a ten-second stop-and-go penalty because he did not take his full grid penalty. Buemi defended from Lotterer on the outside under braking for the turn 11 chicane at the conclusion of lap one, just as Lotterer defended from di Grassi who made minor contact with him. On the third lap, it was announced that the Techeetahs of Vergne and Lotterer were under investigation for a potential jump start.

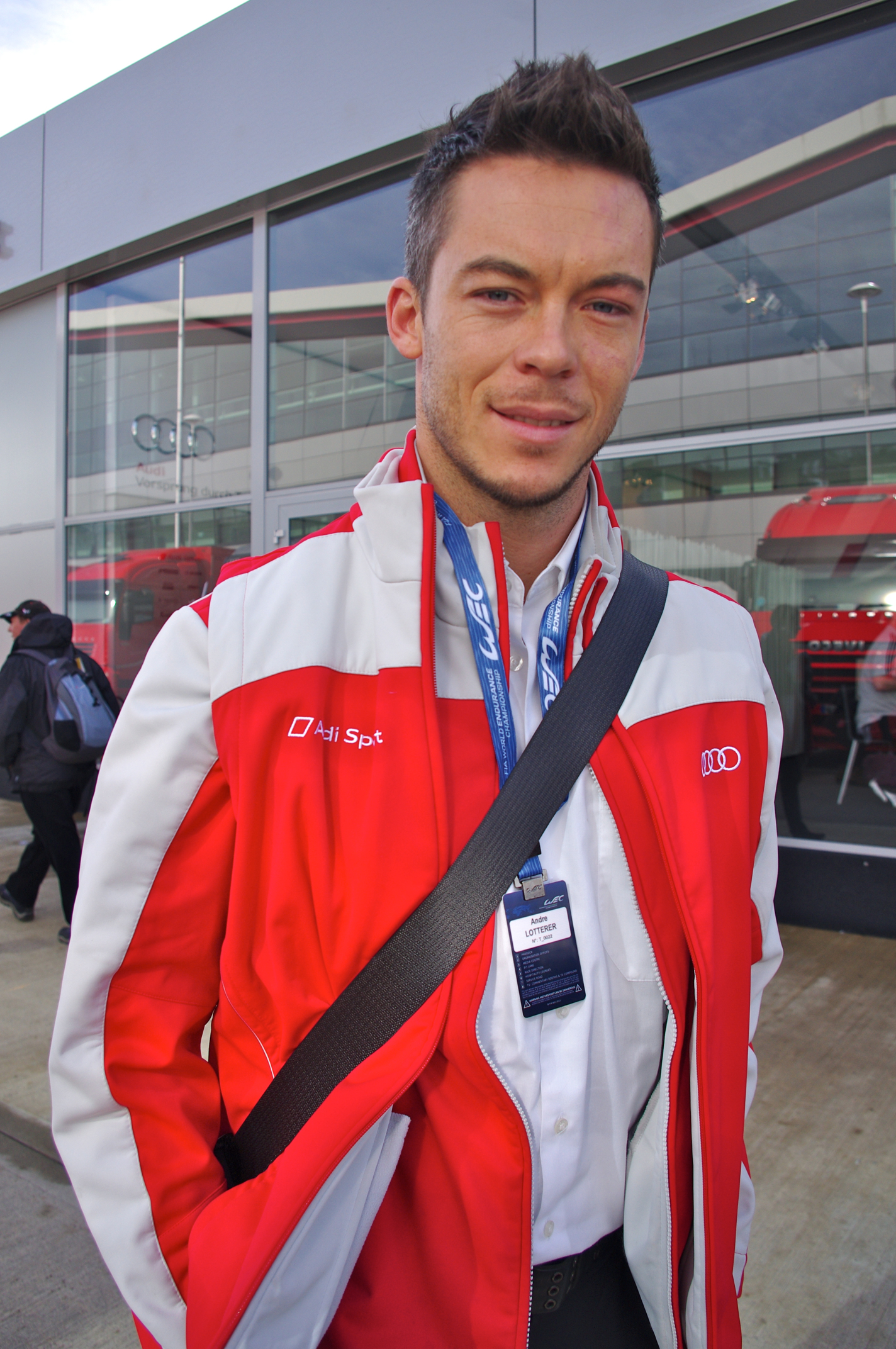
André Lotterer (pictured in 2013) began from second but was handed a ten-second stop-and-go penalty for jumping the start.

Evans went to the inside of Rosenqvist going into turn six but Rosenqvist blocked the pass on the next lap. On lap five, Lotterer turned to the inside to overtake Buemi for second entering the turn eleven chicane, as di Grassi sustained minor front wing damage during a failed pass on Buemi. Dillmann entered the pit lane to retire with a transmission failure on the lap. On the eighth lap, a full course yellow flag was necessitated because López broke his right-rear suspension on the turn two kerb, stopping at the side of the track at turn six to retire, as his front wing almost caught fire when he hit the barrier. As the full course yellow was activated, Filippi went to the inside of Félix da Costa into the turn 11 chicane, but Félix da Costa moved towards Filippi. That caused Filippi to strike the rear of Félix da Costa's car. Filippi drifted across the track with a broken front wing and right-front wheel bearing, collecting d'Ambrosio who was behind him in the turn's braking zone. It was during the full course yellow that the stewards imposed a ten-second stop-and-go penalty on Lotterer; Vergne was not penalised.

The full course yellow procedure was lifted on lap eleven, and racing resumed with Vergne leading at the rolling restart. Lotterer took his ten-second stop-and-go penalty in the pit lane at the start of the following lap. He emerged in fifteenth as Buemi moved into second and di Grassi took over third. That lap, di Grassi overtook Buemi around the inside to move into second at the turn 11 chicane. His teammate Abt used extra electrical energy to replicate a similar manoeuvre on Piquet for fifth. Engel retired with a sudden loss of car power on the next lap. Abt earned one championship point with the race's fastest lap at 1 minute and 15.552 seconds on lap 15. On lap 18, Félix da Costa incurred a ten-second stop-and-go penalty for the collision with Filippi and three e-licence penalty points. On the same lap, Vergne, Buemi and Abt were announced as the winners of the FanBoost vote. As di Grassi closed up to Vergne, his teammate Abt overtook Buemi on the inside for third entering the turn 11 chicane on the 19th lap. Piquet allowed his teammate Evans through on the inside for fifth but later lost sixth to Rosenqvist at the final corner on lap 21.

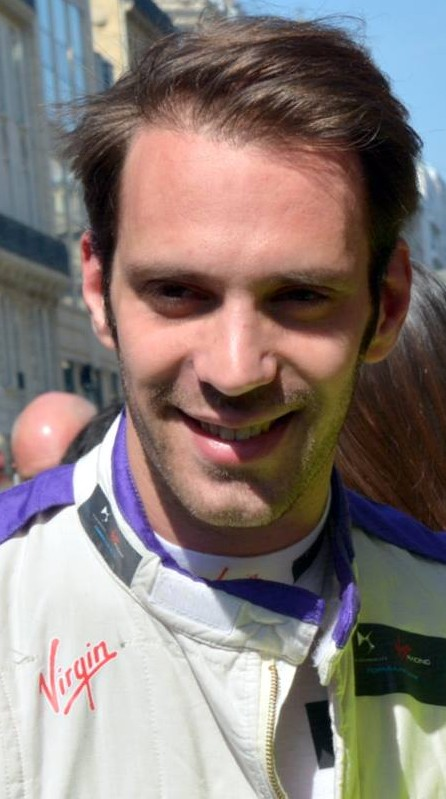
Jean-Éric Vergne (pictured in 2016) led every lap of the second race and held off di Grassi to claim his fourth victory of the season.

At the end of lap 22, the mandatory pit stops to change into a second car commenced when Abt entered the pit lane after a strategy miscommunication. The rest of the front runners made their stops at the conclusion of the following lap. After the pit stops, Vergne retained the lead with di Grassi close behind in second, Abt in third and Buemi fourth. Rosenqvist passed Evans for fifth. Buemi used his FanBoost to overtake Abt by out-braking him for third amidst a heavy defence from Abt on the approach to turn eleven on the 26th lap. This allowed Vergne to draw clear as Buemi and Abt slowed each other in the process. Three laps later, a driver error from Buemi at turn two made him vulnerable to Abt. The Audi driver had additional momentum and used it to retake third from Buemi into turn six. On lap 36, Heidfeld overtook Piquet for seventh before the turn eleven chicane, and repelled his subsequent attack into the final corner. Lotterer overtook Prost for 11th two laps later.

In the meantime, di Grassi sought to get by Vergne for the lead. Vergne used his FanBoost to mitigate di Grassi's attack though he subsequently conserved electrical energy by slowing. On lap 39, as Vergne continued to conserve electrical energy, di Grassi was caught out by him, and pushed the rear of his car heading into the final turn, knocking the rear camera out of alignment. Further down the field, Lotterer passed Sarrazin for tenth going into turn six on the next lap. He passed the electrical energy conservative Bird for ninth on the straight linking turns ten and eleven on the 41st lap. Di Grassi could not find a way past Vergne, and the latter finished the race first to take his fourth victory of the season, and the fifth of his career. Di Grassi and Abt finished in second and third to claim the Teams' Championship for Audi. Off the podium, Buemi finished fourth, ahead of Rosenqvist in fifth, and Evans sixth. Piquet, Heidfeld, Lotterer, Bird rounded out the top ten. The final finishers were Prost, Sarrazin, Ma, Lynn, and Félix da Costa. No lead changes occurred as Vergne led the race from start to finish.

=== Post-race ===
The top three drivers appeared on the podium to collect their trophies and spoke to the media in a later press conference. Vergne congratulated Audi on claiming the Teams' Championship and Techeetah for its effort during the season and said his team did not allow any errors to be made. Di Grassi reserved praise for Vergne taking the Drivers' Championship and said he was delighted for Audi winning the Teams' Championship because of the manufacturer's commitment to Formula E and the work its staff at the team's garage put in, " Every time we say the same but I'm very proud that Audi committed to Formula E, suffering a lot, keeping their head high, recovering and in the last race winning by two points is just unbelievable.” Third-placed Abt hailed the conclusion of Audi's season and that they would be stronger for the following season.

Audi Formula E Project Leader Tristan Summerdale eulogised the team's comeback throughout the season after multiple inverter failures in its opening four rounds, and praised di Grassi and Abt for their perseverance, “I think what we achieved is pretty special and the whole team and our suppliers have to take so much credit. To consider where we were after Santiago and then to see the number of points we have been able to put on the board is mighty. It's a great comeback and shows the great resilience we have at Audi." Mark Preston, team principal of Techeetah, said that the outfit's loss of the Teams' Championship to Audi would not deduct itself from their achievements, and it provided them with additional motivation for an improved performance in the 2018–19 season, "This has been a wonderful season. Against all the odds, we have built a team that is capable of taking on the best manufacturers in the championship and compete right to the very end."

Vergne and his teammate Lotterer were fined €5,000 and incurred two penalty points on their e-licences after scrutineers found during inspection that both drivers were wearing "non-compliant underwear" during the second qualifying session, a transgression of series regulations. Regarding his jump start, Lotterer admitted he was at fault because he was no longer able to hold his grip on the clutch, and apologised for losing Techeetah the Teams' Championship, "It's hard to accept now losing the championship like this, although it's a season's result, but I was the one that messed it up. I'm gutted for the team. We win together, we lose together. They tried to cheer me up, they're a nice team, and I'm really thankful to race with these guys. It's a shame because we put in so much hard work, but we lost it like this and they really deserved it."

The final championship standings meant Vergne won the Drivers' Championship by 54 points over di Grassi whose second-place finish saw him pass Bird for second as Bird was tenth in the second race. With 120 points, Buemi finished in fourth place, and Abt was a further five points behind in the fifth position. Audi won the Teams' Championship by two points over Techeetah in second. Virgin placed third with 160 points. After both its drivers finished in the top ten, Mahindra held fourth from e.Dams-Renault in the final standings.

=== Standings after the race ===
Drivers' Championship standings

+/–	Pos	Driver	Points
	1	(France) Jean-Éric Vergne	198
1	2	(Brazil) Lucas di Grassi	144 (−54)
1	3	(United Kingdom) Sam Bird	143 (−55)
	4	(Switzerland) Sébastien Buemi	125 (−73)
	5	(Germany) Daniel Abt	120 (−78)

Teams' Championship standings

+/–	Pos	Constructor	Points
1	1	(Germany) Audi	264
1	2	(China) Techeetah-Renault	262 (−2)
	3	(United Kingdom) Virgin-Citroën	160 (−104)
	4	(India) Mahindra	138 (−126)
	5	(France) e.Dams-Renault	133 (−131)

- Notes: Only the top five positions are included for both sets of standings.

== Classification ==
=== Qualifying one ===
Final first qualifying classification
Pos.	No.	Driver	Team	GS	SP	Grid
1	9	(Switzerland) Sébastien Buemi	e.Dams-Renault	1:14.178	1:13.911	1
2	20	(New Zealand) Mitch Evans	Jaguar	1:14.050	1:14.465	2
3	8	(France) Nico Prost	e.Dams-Renault	1:14.198	1:14.921	3
4	7	(Belgium) Jérôme d'Ambrosio	Dragon-Penske	1:14.121	1:15.391	4
5	66	(Germany) Daniel Abt	Audi	1:13.981	1:16.579	5
6	3	(Brazil) Nelson Piquet Jr.	Jaguar	1:14.203	—N/a	6
7	6	(Argentina) José María López	Dragon-Penske	1:14.244	—N/a	7
8	5	(Germany) Maro Engel	Venturi	1:14.292	—N/a	8
9	4	(France) Tom Dillmann	Venturi	1:14.304	—N/a	9
10	23	(Germany) Nick Heidfeld	Mahindra	1:14.322	—N/a	10
11	1	(Brazil) Lucas di Grassi	Audi	1:14.325	—N/a	11
12	28	(Portugal) António Félix da Costa	Andretti-BMW	1:14.382	—N/a	12
13	36	(United Kingdom) Alex Lynn	Virgin-Citroën	1:14.473	—N/a	13
14	2	(United Kingdom) Sam Bird	Virgin-Citroën	1:14.484	—N/a	14
15	68	(Italy) Luca Filippi	NIO	1:14.523	—N/a	15
16	19	(Sweden) Felix Rosenqvist	Mahindra	1:14.825	—N/a	16
17	27	(France) Stéphane Sarrazin	Andretti-BMW	1:26.036	—N/a	17
18	25	(France) Jean-Éric Vergne	Techeetah-Renault	—	—N/a	18^{1}
19	18	(Germany) André Lotterer	Techeetah-Renault	—	—N/a	19^{1}
WD	16	(United Kingdom) Oliver Turvey	NIO	—	—N/a	—^{2}

Notes:

- **^1** — Jean-Éric Vergne and André Lotterer had all their qualifying lap times deleted for overusing power limit over 200KW.
- **^2** — Oliver Turvey was withdrawn from the weekend after fracturing his fifth metacarpal bone on his left hand in a crash during the second practice session.

=== Race one ===
Drivers who scored championship points are denoted in bold.

Final first race classification
Pos.	No.	Driver	Team	Laps	Time/Retired	Grid	Points
1	**1**	**(Brazil) Lucas di Grassi**	**Audi**	**43**	**1:02:30.054**	**11**	25
2	**66**	**(Germany) Daniel Abt**	**Audi**	**43**	**+0.965**	**5**	18+1^{3}
3	**9**	**(Switzerland) Sébastien Buemi**	**e.Dams-Renault**	**43**	**+2.583**	**1**	15+3^{4}
4	**4**	**(France) Tom Dillmann**	**Venturi**	**43**	**+4.090**	**9**	12
5	**25**	**(France) Jean-Éric Vergne**	**Techeetah-Renault**	**43**	**+4.679**	**18**	10
6	**23**	**(Germany) Nick Heidfeld**	**Mahindra**	**43**	**+5.142**	**10**	8
7	**18**	**(Germany) André Lotterer**	**Techeetah-Renault**	**43**	**+5.810**	**19**	6
8	**5**	**(Germany) Maro Engel**	**Venturi**	**43**	**+6.312**	**8**	4
9	**2**	**(United Kingdom) Sam Bird**	**Virgin-Citroën**	**43**	**+6.833**	**14**	2
10	**8**	**(France) Nico Prost**	**e.Dams-Renault**	**43**	**+8.389**	**3**	1
11	28	(Portugal) António Félix da Costa	Andretti-BMW	43	+9.114	12	
12	27	(France) Stéphane Sarrazin	Andretti-BMW	43	+13.242	17	
13	7	(Belgium) Jérôme d'Ambrosio	Dragon-Penske	43	+13.805	4	
14	19	(Sweden) Felix Rosenqvist	Mahindra	43	+35.452	16	
15	68	(Italy) Luca Filippi	NIO	42	+1 Lap	15	
Ret	36	(United Kingdom) Alex Lynn	Virgin-Citroën	33	Accident	13	
Ret	6	(Argentina) José María López	Dragon-Penske	30	Suspension	7	
Ret	3	(Brazil) Nelson Piquet Jr.	Jaguar	30	Battery	6	
Ret	20	(New Zealand) Mitch Evans	Jaguar	0	Driveshaft	2	
WD	16	(United Kingdom) Oliver Turvey	NIO	—	—	—	

Notes:

- **^3** — One point for the fastest lap was awarded to Daniel Abt as Felix Rosenqvist did not finish in the top ten.
- **^4** — Three points for pole position.

=== Qualifying two ===
Final second qualifying classification
Pos.	No.	Driver	Team	GS	SP	Grid
1	9	(Switzerland) Sébastien Buemi	e.Dams-Renault	1:18.139	1:17.973	1
2	18	(Germany) André Lotterer	Techeetah-Renault	1:18.315	1:18.013	2
3	25	(France) Jean-Éric Vergne	Techeetah-Renault	1:18.571	1:18.031	3
4	66	(Germany) Daniel Abt	Audi	1:18.432	1:18.145	4
5	1	(Brazil) Lucas di Grassi	Audi	1:17.867	—	5
6	20	(New Zealand) Mitch Evans	Jaguar	1:18.580	—N/a	6
7	3	(Brazil) Nelson Piquet Jr.	Jaguar	1:18.704	—N/a	7
8	2	(United Kingdom) Sam Bird	Virgin-Citroën	1:18.794	—N/a	8
9	19	(Sweden) Felix Rosenqvist	Mahindra	1:18.828	—N/a	9
10	27	(France) Stéphane Sarrazin	Andretti-BMW	1:19.017	—N/a	10
11	6	(Argentina) José María López	Dragon-Penske	1:19.114	—N/a	11
12	7	(Belgium) Jérôme d'Ambrosio	Dragon-Penske	1:19.124	—N/a	12
13	23	(Germany) Nick Heidfeld	Mahindra	1:19.168	—N/a	13
14	4	(France) Tom Dillmann	Venturi	1:19.365	—N/a	14
15	68	(Italy) Luca Filippi	NIO	1:19.454	—N/a	15
16	8	(France) Nico Prost	e.Dams-Renault	1:19.529	—N/a	16
17	5	(Germany) Maro Engel	Venturi	1:19.540	—N/a	17
18	36	(United Kingdom) Alex Lynn	Virgin-Citroën	1:19.658	—N/a	19^{5}
19	16	(China) Ma Qinghua	NIO	1:26.086	—N/a	18
20	28	(Portugal) António Félix da Costa	Andretti-BMW	—	—N/a	20^{5}

Notes:

- **^5**— Alex Lynn and António Félix da Costa were each penalised ten positions for changing their gearboxes.

=== Race two ===
Drivers who scored championship points are denoted in bold.

Final second race classification
Pos.	No.	Driver	Team	Laps	Time/Retired	Grid	Points
**1**	**25**	**(France) Jean-Éric Vergne**	**Techeetah-Renault**	**43**	**1:01:38.089**	**2**	25
**2**	**1**	**(Brazil) Lucas di Grassi**	**Audi**	**43**	**+0.508**	**5**	18
**3**	**66**	**(Germany) Daniel Abt**	**Audi**	**43**	**+1.287**	**4**	15+1^{6}
**4**	**9**	**(Switzerland) Sébastien Buemi**	**e.Dams-Renault**	**43**	**+1.780**	**1**	12+3^{7}
**5**	**19**	**(Sweden) Felix Rosenqvist**	**Mahindra**	**43**	**+12.146**	**9**	10
**6**	**20**	**(New Zealand) Mitch Evans**	**Jaguar**	**43**	**+20.050**	**6**	8
**7**	**3**	**(Brazil) Nelson Piquet Jr.**	**Jaguar**	**43**	**+20.592**	**7**	6
**8**	**23**	**(Germany) Nick Heidfeld**	**Mahindra**	**43**	**+24.275**	**13**	4
**9**	**18**	**(Germany) André Lotterer**	**Techeetah-Renault**	**43**	**+28.821**	**2**	2
**10**	**2**	**(United Kingdom) Sam Bird**	**Virgin-Citroën**	**43**	**+32.810**	**8**	1
11	8	(France) Nico Prost	e.Dams-Renault	43	+34.100	16	
12	27	(France) Stéphane Sarrazin	Andretti-BMW	43	+34.594	10	
13	16	(China) Ma Qinghua	NIO	42	+1 Lap	18	
14	36	(United Kingdom) Alex Lynn	Virgin-Citroën	42	+1 Lap	19	
15	28	(Portugal) António Félix da Costa	Andretti-BMW	40	+3 Laps	20	
Ret	5	(Germany) Maro Engel	Venturi	15	Power	17	
Ret	68	(Italy) Luca Filippi	NIO	7	Crash	15	
Ret	7	(Belgium) Jérôme d'Ambrosio	Dragon-Penske	6	Crash	12	
Ret	6	(Argentina) José María López	Dragon-Penske	5	Suspension	11	
Ret	4	(France) Tom Dillmann	Venturi	4	Gearbox	14	

Notes:

- **^6** — One point for fastest lap.
- **^7** — Three points for pole position.

== Notes and references ==
=== References ===
Previous race: 2018 Zürich ePrix	FIA Formula E Championship; 2017–18 season	Next race: 2018 Ad Diriyah ePrix
Previous race: 2017 New York City ePrix	New York City ePrix	Next race: 2019 New York City ePrix
