= Fréquence Banane =

Ecublens, Switzerland; Switzerland
- Frequency: (100.5 (temporary)) MHz

Programming
- Affiliations: UNIKOM

History
- First air date: November 1, 1993

Technical information
- Translators: Digital Audio Broadcasting, Cable, Internet

Links
- Webcast: fbpc5.epfl.ch/fb_128.m3u
- Website: frequencebanane.ch

Fréquence Banane is the student radio of EPFL and the University of Lausanne based in Ecublens/Switzerland. It is a non-commercial community radio station member of UNIKOM-Radios.
