= List of Formula E ePrix =

The following is a complete list of Formula E ePrix which have been a part of the FIA Formula E Championship since its inception in 2014.

As of the 2026 London ePrix, 165 ePrix have been held.

The term ePrix is derived from the single-seater tradition of the Grand Prix, while changing the term to represent its nature of using only electric powered cars. In Gen1 and Gen2 eras, ePrix were held almost exclusively on city centered street courses, with some exceptions being held on permanent race tracks instead of the usual street course; examples include the Autódromo Hermanos Rodríguez and Circuit Ricardo Tormo. The Berlin ePrix are raced in an existing space at the Berlin Tempelhof Airport, featuring wide long sweeping turns and a track made up of 100% concrete. The Excel London Circuit was the only track that runs both indoor and outdoor. Courses vary in length from 1.860 to 3.934 km (1.156 to 2.444 mi).

Since the inception of Formula E Gen3, the championship has shifted from street circuits to more permanent tracks, often resulting in smaller versions of notable venues to ensure traditional track length; examples include the Portland International Raceway and the Shanghai International Circuit. ePrix generally have a race distance between 80 and 100 km (50 and 62 mi). Since 2022, the Circuit de Monaco has been the only track in Formula E that uses the same layout as a Formula One Grand Prix.

== Active and past races ==
The information below is correct as of the 2026 London ePrix.

Key
†	Current races (for the 2025–26 season)	**	Future (for the 2027 season)

=== By race title ===
ePrix	Country	Season													Total races
ePrix	Country	1 2014–15	2 2015–16	3 2016–17	4 2017–18	5 2018–19	6 2019–20	7 2020–21	8 2021–22	9 2022–23	10 2023–24	11 2024–25	12 2025–26	13 2027	Total races
Beijing	China	1	1												2
Putrajaya	Malaysia	1	1												2
Punta del Este	Uruguay	1	1		1										3
Buenos Aires	Argentina	1	1	1											3
Miami^{†}	United States	1										1	1	0	3
Long Beach	United States	1	1												2
Monaco^{†}	Monaco	1		1		1		1	1	1	1	2	2	0	11 (Note: The 2025 and 2026 Monaco ePrix were double header events. The 2027 Monaco ePrix will be a double header event)
Berlin^{†}	Germany	1	1	2	1	1	6	2	2	2	2	2	2	0	24 (Note: The 2017, 2023–2026 Berlin ePrix were double header events. The 2027 Berlin ePrix will be a double header event. The 2020 Berlin ePrix consisted of six races divided into three double headers. Both the 2021 and 2022 Berlin ePrix consisted of two races, each using the same layout, but the second race was held in reversed layout.)
Moscow	Russia	1													1
London^{†}	United Kingdom	2	2					2	2	2	2	2	2	0	16 (Note: All London ePrix held so far were double header events. The 2027 London ePrix will be also a double header event.)
Mexico City^{†}	Mexico		1	1	1	1	1		1	1	1	1	1	0	10
Paris	France		1	1	1	1									4
Hong Kong	Hong Kong			1	2	1									4 (Note: The 2017 Hong Kong ePrix was a double header event.)
Marrakesh	Morocco			1	1	1	1		1						5
New York City	United States			2	2	2		2	2						10 (Note: All New York City ePrix held were double header events.)
Montreal	Canada			2											2 (Note: The 2017 Montreal ePrix was a double header event.)
Santiago	Chile				1	1	1								3
Rome	Italy				1	1		2	2	2					8 (Note: The 2021–2023 Rome ePrix were double header events.)
Zürich	Switzerland				1										1
Diriyah	Saudi Arabia					1	2	2	2	2	2				11 (Note: All Diriyah ePrix, except the 2018 edition, were double header events.)
Sanya^{†}	China					1							1	0	2
Swiss (Bern)	Switzerland					1									1
Valencia	Spain							2							2 (Note: The 2021 Valencia ePrix was a double header event.)
Puebla	Mexico							2							2 (Note: The 2021 Puebla ePrix was a double header event.)
Jakarta	Indonesia								1	2		1			4 (Note: The 2023 Jakarta ePrix was a double header event.)
Seoul	South Korea								2						2 (Note: The 2022 Seoul ePrix was a double header event.)
Hyderabad	India									1					1
Cape Town	South Africa									1					1
São Paulo^{†}	Brazil									1	1	1	1	0	4
Portland	United States									1	2				3 (Note: The 2024 Portland ePrix was a double header event.)
Tokyo^{†}	Japan										1	2	2	0	5 (Note: The 2025 and 2026 Tokyo ePrix were double header events. The 2027 Tokyo ePrix will be a double header event.)
Misano	Italy										2				2 (Note: The 2024 Misano ePrix was a double header event.)
Shanghai^{†}	China										2	2	2	0	6 (Note: All Shanghai ePrix held so far were double header events. The 2027 Shanghai ePrix will be a double header event.)
Jeddah^{†}	Saudi Arabia											2	2	0	4 (Note: Both Jeddah ePrix held so far were double header events. The 2027 Jeddah ePrix will be a double header event.)
Madrid ^{†}	Spain												1	0	1 (Note: The 2027 Madrid ePrix will be a double header event.)
Austin ^{**}	United States													0	0
Zandvoort ^{**}	Netherlands													0	0 (Note: The 2027 Zandvoort ePrix will be a double header event.)

=== By host nation ===
Country	Races held	Tracks used	Circuit Layout	Races per Track	Total races
Germany^{†}	Berlin ePrix^{†}	Tempelhof Airport Street Circuit	Berlin Tempelhof	23	24
Germany^{†}	Berlin ePrix^{†}	Berlin Street Circuit	Berlin Karl Marx	1	24
United States^{†}	New York City ePrix	Brooklyn Street Circuit	Brooklyn	10	18
United States^{†}	Portland ePrix	Portland International Raceway	Portland	3	18
United States^{†}	Long Beach ePrix	Long Beach Street Circuit	Long Beach EPrix	2	18
United States^{†}	Miami ePrix^{†}	Biscayne Bay Street Circuit	Miami	1	18
United States^{†}	Miami ePrix^{†}	Homestead-Miami Speedway	Miami	1	18
United States^{†}	Miami ePrix^{†}	Miami International Autodrome	Miami	1	18
United States^{†}	Austin ePrix^{**}	Circuit of the Americas		0	18
United Kingdom^{†}	London ePrix^{†}	ExCeL London Circuit	London ExCeL	12	16
United Kingdom^{†}	London ePrix^{†}	Battersea Park Street Circuit	London Battersea	4	16
United Kingdom^{†}	London ePrix^{†}	Brands Hatch^{**}		0	16
Saudi Arabia^{†}	Diriyah ePrix	Riyadh Street Circuit	Diriyah	11	15
Saudi Arabia^{†}	Jeddah ePrix^{†}	Jeddah Corniche Circuit	Jeddah	4	15
Mexico^{†}	Mexico City ePrix^{†}	Autódromo Hermanos Rodríguez	Mexico City	10	12
Mexico^{†}	Puebla ePrix	Autódromo Miguel E. Abed	Puebla	2	12
China^{†}	Hong Kong ePrix	Hong Kong Central Harbourfront Circuit	Hong Kong	4	14
China^{†}	Shanghai ePrix^{†}	Shanghai International Circuit	Shanghai	6	14
China^{†}	Beijing ePrix	Beijing Olympic Green Circuit	Beijing	2	14
China^{†}	Sanya ePrix^{†}	Sanya Street Circuit	Sanya	2	14
Italy	Rome ePrix	Circuito Cittadino dell'EUR	Rome	8	10
Italy	Misano ePrix	Misano World Circuit	Misano	2	10
Monaco^{†}	Monaco ePrix^{†}	Circuit de Monaco	Monaco	11	11
Morocco	Marrakesh ePrix	Circuit International Automobile Moulay El Hassan	Marrakech	5	5
Japan^{†}	Tokyo ePrix^{†}	Tokyo Street Circuit	Tokyo	5	5
France	Paris ePrix	Paris Street Circuit	Paris	4	4
Indonesia	Jakarta ePrix	Jakarta International e-Prix Circuit	Jakarta	4	4
Brazil^{†}	São Paulo ePrix^{†}	São Paulo Street Circuit	São Paulo	4	4
Chile	Santiago ePrix	Parque O'Higgins Circuit	Santiago Parque	2	3
Chile	Santiago ePrix	Santiago Street Circuit	Santiago Street	1	3
Argentina	Buenos Aires ePrix	Puerto Madero Street Circuit	Buenos Aires	3	3
Uruguay	Punta del Este ePrix	Punta del Este Street Circuit	Punta del Este	3	3
Spain^{†}	Valencia ePrix	Circuit Ricardo Tormo	Valencia	2	3
Spain^{†}	Madrid ePrix^{†}	Circuito del Jarama	Madrid	1	3
Canada	Montreal ePrix	Montréal Street Circuit	Montreal	2	2
Switzerland	Zürich ePrix	Zürich Street Circuit	Zürich	1	2
Switzerland	Swiss ePrix (Bern)	Bern Street Circuit	Bern	1	2
South Korea	Seoul ePrix	Seoul Street Circuit	Seoul	2	2
Malaysia	Putrajaya ePrix	Putrajaya Street Circuit	Putrajaya	2	2
Russia	Moscow ePrix	Moscow Street Circuit	Moscow	1	1
India	Hyderabad ePrix	Hyderabad Street Circuit	Hyderabad	1	1
South Africa	Cape Town ePrix	Cape Town Street Circuit	Cape Town	1	1
Netherlands^{**}	Zandvoort ePrix^{**}	Circuit Zandvoort^{**}		0	0

== Races by season ==
Rnd	2014–15	2015–16	2016–17	2017–18	2018–19	2019–20	2020–21	2021–22	2022–23	2023–24	2024–25	2025–26	2027
1	(China) Beijing	(China) Beijing	Hong Kong	Hong Kong*	(Saudi Arabia) Ad Diriyah	(Saudi Arabia) Diriyah*	(Saudi Arabia) Diriyah*	(Saudi Arabia) Diriyah*	Mexico City	Mexico City	(Brazil) São Paulo	(Brazil) São Paulo	(Saudi Arabia) Jeddah*
2	(Malaysia) Putrajaya	(Malaysia) Putrajaya	(Morocco) Marrakesh	Hong Kong*	(Morocco) Marrakesh	(Saudi Arabia) Diriyah*	(Saudi Arabia) Diriyah*	(Saudi Arabia) Diriyah*	(Saudi Arabia) Diriyah*	(Saudi Arabia) Diriyah*	Mexico City	Mexico City	(Saudi Arabia) Jeddah*
3	(Uruguay) Punta del Este	(Uruguay) Punta del Este	(Argentina) Buenos Aires	(Morocco) Marrakesh	(Chile) Santiago	(Chile) Santiago	(Italy) Rome*	Mexico City	(Saudi Arabia) Diriyah*	(Saudi Arabia) Diriyah*	(Saudi Arabia) Jeddah*	(United States) Miami	Mexico City
4	(Argentina) Buenos Aires	(Argentina) Buenos Aires	Mexico City	(Chile) Santiago	Mexico City	Mexico City	(Italy) Rome*	(Italy) Rome*	(India) Hyderabad	(Brazil) São Paulo	(Saudi Arabia) Jeddah*	(Saudi Arabia) Jeddah*	(United States) Austin
5	(United States) Miami	Mexico City	Monaco	Mexico City	Hong Kong	(Morocco) Marrakesh	(Spain) Valencia*	(Italy) Rome*	(South Africa) Cape Town	(Japan) Tokyo	(United States) Miami	(Saudi Arabia) Jeddah*	(United States) Miami
6	(United States) Long Beach	(United States) Long Beach	(France) Paris	(Uruguay) Punta del Este	(China) Sanya	(Germany) Berlin*	(Spain) Valencia*	Monaco	(Brazil) São Paulo	(Italy) Misano*	Monaco*	(Spain) Madrid	(Brazil) São Paulo
7	Monaco	(France) Paris	(Germany) Berlin*	(Italy) Rome	(Italy) Rome	(Germany) Berlin*	Monaco	(Germany) Berlin*	(Germany) Berlin*	(Italy) Misano*	Monaco*	(Germany) Berlin*	(China) Sanya
8	(Germany) Berlin	(Germany) Berlin	(Germany) Berlin*	(France) Paris	(France) Paris	(Germany) Berlin*	(Mexico) Puebla*	(Germany) Berlin*	(Germany) Berlin*	Monaco	(Japan) Tokyo*	(Germany) Berlin*	(Germany) Berlin*
9	(Russia) Moscow	(United Kingdom) London*	(United States) New York City*	(Germany) Berlin	Monaco	(Germany) Berlin*	(Mexico) Puebla*	(Indonesia) Jakarta	Monaco	(Germany) Berlin*	(Japan) Tokyo*	Monaco*	(Germany) Berlin*
10	(United Kingdom) London*	(United Kingdom) London*	(United States) New York City*	(Switzerland) Zürich	(Germany) Berlin	(Germany) Berlin*	(United States) New York City*	(Morocco) Marrakesh	(Indonesia) Jakarta*	(Germany) Berlin*	(China) Shanghai*	Monaco*	Monaco*
11	(United Kingdom) London*	—N/a	(Canada) Montreal*	(United States) New York City*	(Switzerland) Swiss (Bern)	(Germany) Berlin*	(United States) New York City*	(United States) New York City*	(Indonesia) Jakarta*	(China) Shanghai*	(China) Shanghai*	(China) Sanya	Monaco*
12	—N/a	—N/a	(Canada) Montreal*	(United States) New York City*	(United States) New York City*	—N/a	(United Kingdom) London*	(United States) New York City*	(United States) Portland	(China) Shanghai*	(Indonesia) Jakarta	(China) Shanghai*	(United Kingdom) London*
13	—N/a	—N/a	—N/a	—N/a	(United States) New York City*	—N/a	(United Kingdom) London*	(United Kingdom) London*	(Italy) Rome*	(United States) Portland*	(Germany) Berlin*	(China) Shanghai*	(United Kingdom) London*
14	—N/a	—N/a	—N/a	—N/a	—N/a	—N/a	(Germany) Berlin*	(United Kingdom) London*	(Italy) Rome*	(United States) Portland*	(Germany) Berlin*	(Japan) Tokyo*	(Netherlands) Zandvoort*
15	—N/a	—N/a	—N/a	—N/a	—N/a	—N/a	(Germany) Berlin*	(South Korea) Seoul*	(United Kingdom) London*	(United Kingdom) London*	(United Kingdom) London*	(Japan) Tokyo*	(Netherlands) Zandvoort*
16	—N/a	—N/a	—N/a	—N/a	—N/a	—N/a	—N/a	(South Korea) Seoul*	(United Kingdom) London*	(United Kingdom) London*	(United Kingdom) London*	(United Kingdom) London*	(Spain) Madrid*
17	—N/a	—N/a	—N/a	—N/a	—N/a	—N/a	—N/a	—N/a	—N/a	—N/a	—N/a	(United Kingdom) London*	(Spain) Madrid*
18	—N/a	—N/a	—N/a	—N/a	—N/a	—N/a	—N/a	—N/a	—N/a	—N/a	—N/a	—N/a	(China) Shanghai*
19	—N/a	—N/a	—N/a	—N/a	—N/a	—N/a	—N/a	—N/a	—N/a	—N/a	—N/a	—N/a	(China) Shanghai*
20	—N/a	—N/a	—N/a	—N/a	—N/a	—N/a	—N/a	—N/a	—N/a	—N/a	—N/a	—N/a	(Japan) Tokyo*
21	—N/a	—N/a	—N/a	—N/a	—N/a	—N/a	—N/a	—N/a	—N/a	—N/a	—N/a	—N/a	(Japan) Tokyo*

* denotes two or more races in the ePrix
