= Fortescue Zero Racing =

British-Australian racing team

(Australia) (United Kingdom) Fortescue Zero Racing
- Founded: 2026
- Founder(s): Andrew Forrest
- Base: Kidlington, England
- Team principal(s): Jim Wright
- Current series: Formula E
- Current drivers: 20. (United Kingdom) Dan Ticktum; 30. TBA

Fortescue Zero Racing is a British-based Australian racing team which is set to compete in Formula E. The team, owned by mining and energy giant Fortescue, was formed following the buyout of Penske Autosport in September 2026.

== History ==
On 24 January 2022, Australian mining and energy firm Fortescue announced its purchase of Williams Advanced Engineering for £164m. In January 2023, the company was renamed WAE Technologies. In June 2024, it was rebranded again as Fortescue Zero. Fortescue Zero supplied the battery technology used in Extreme E and Formula E Gen3 cars, as well as the new-for-2025 Pit Boost, and is the service provider for Jaguar Racing since 2016.

On 18 September 2026, Andrew Forrest announced the buyout of Penske Autosport, thus adding full ownership of a team to Fortescue Zero's Formula E portfolio. The team will run Jaguar powertrains and be based in Kidlington, England. Jim Wright was appointed as team principal and British duo Taylor Barnard and Dan Ticktum were announced as the team's driver line up for the 2026–27 season. After a contract dispute with Barnard, who was attempting to release himself from Fortescue Zero in favour of the newly formed Fusion Formula E Team, Paul Aron was present at Circuito del Jarama to test for the team with Barnard being left out in the official season entry list. Fortescue Zero expressed its disappointment with the situation and that Barnard is still signed to the team.

== Results ==
Year	Chassis	Powertrain	Tyres	No.	Drivers	1	2	3	4	5	6	7	8	9	10	11	12	13	14	15	16	17	18	19	20	21	Points	T.C.
Fortescue Zero Racing
2026–27	Formula E Gen4	Jaguar I-Type 08	B			MEX	COA	MIA	SAO	SYX	JED		MCO		BER		GBR		NED		MAD		SHA		TKO			
2026–27	Formula E Gen4	Jaguar I-Type 08	B	20	(United Kingdom) Dan Ticktum																							
2026–27	Formula E Gen4	Jaguar I-Type 08	B	30	TBA																							

Notes

- ^{G} – Driver was fastest in group qualifying stage and was given one championship point.
- † – Driver did not finish the race, but was classified as he completed over 90% of the race distance.
- * – Season still in progress.
