= Taylor Barnard =

British racing driver (born 2004)

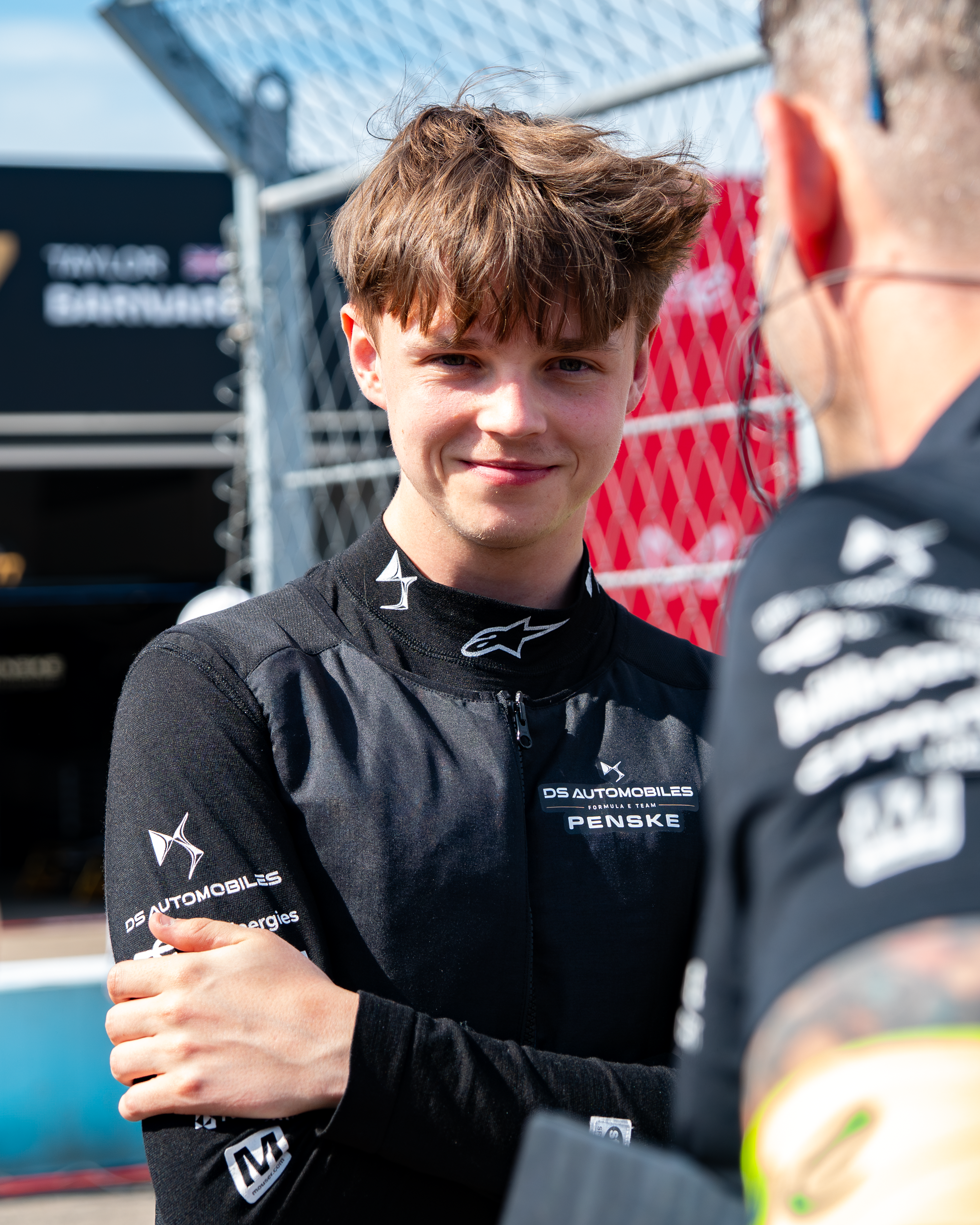
- Barnard at the 2026 Berlin ePrix
- Born: 1 June 2004 (age 22); Norwich, Norfolk, England
- Nationality: (United Kingdom) British

Formula E career
- Debut season: 2023–24
- Current team: Fortescue Zero Racing
- Car number: TBA
- Former teams: McLaren, DS Penske
- Starts: 36
- Championships: 0
- Wins: 1
- Podiums: 6
- Poles: 2
- Fastest laps: 1
- Finished last season: 11th (68 pts)

Previous series
- 2024; 2023–2024; 2023; 2022; 2021–2022; 2020, 2022: FIA Formula 2; FR Middle East; FIA Formula 3; F4 UAE; ADAC F4; Italian F4
- Statistics up to date as of 28 July 2025.

Taylor Barnard (/ˈbɑːrnɑːrd/ BARN-ard; born 1 June 2004) is a British racing driver competing in Formula E and is currently signed to Fortescue Zero Racing.

Barnard began competitive kart racing aged seven, winning several national and continental titles before graduating to junior formulae in 2020. His third season in Formula 4 culminated in his finishing runner-up to Kimi Antonelli in the ADAC Championship with PHM. In 2023, he became a race-winner in FIA Formula 3 and finished runner-up to Antonelli in Formula Regional Middle East. He then joined AIX in FIA Formula 2 for 2024, winning the Monaco sprint race.

Barnard was signed as a reserve and development driver for the McLaren Formula E Team in 2024 and made his debut at the 2024 Monaco ePrix as a replacement for Sam Bird. He was promoted as a full-time driver in 2024–25. Barnard has numerous records in Formula E as the youngest driver to start an ePrix, the youngest points scorer, the youngest podium finisher, the youngest polesitter, the youngest front row starter, the youngest race leader, the youngest driver to set the fastest lap, and the youngest ePrix winner.

== Early and personal life ==
Barnard was born on 1 June 2004 in Norwich, Norfolk, England. He was raised nearby in Horsford.

Barnard labels three-time Formula One World Drivers' Champion Ayrton Senna as his racing idol.

== Junior racing career ==
=== Karting ===
Barnard began karting in 2012 at the Trent Valley Kart Club. From there, he branched out to the Super 1 National Championship, where he would remain until his title victory in 2017. Added to that, Barnard won the Kartmasters British Grand Prix on two occasions, as well as winning the LGM Series in the IAME Cadet category.

Barnard moved onto the European stage in 2018, racing in the OK Junior class for KR Motorsport, for whom he would win the WSK Final Cup at season's end. Having become a karting protégé of Nico Rosberg and joined the Formula One World Champion's Racing Academy, Barnard progressed into the OK Senior category the following year. He would win the WSK Champions Cup at the start of the campaign, whilst coming fourth in the European Championship. That year, Barnard also finished second in the Karting World Championship, missing out narrowly to Lorenzo Travisanutto in wet conditions. Barnard remained with Rosberg Racing Academy for his final karting season in 2020, where he once again ended up as the runner-up of the World Championship, this time losing out against Callum Bradshaw. That year brought more trophies however, with Barnard taking another WSK Champions Cup crown, as well as winning the WSK Open Cup.

=== Lower formulae ===
Barnard made his car racing debut in 2020, competing in three rounds of the Italian F4 Championship for AKM Motorsport. With two points coming from the weekend at Monza, Barnard ended up 26th in the standings.

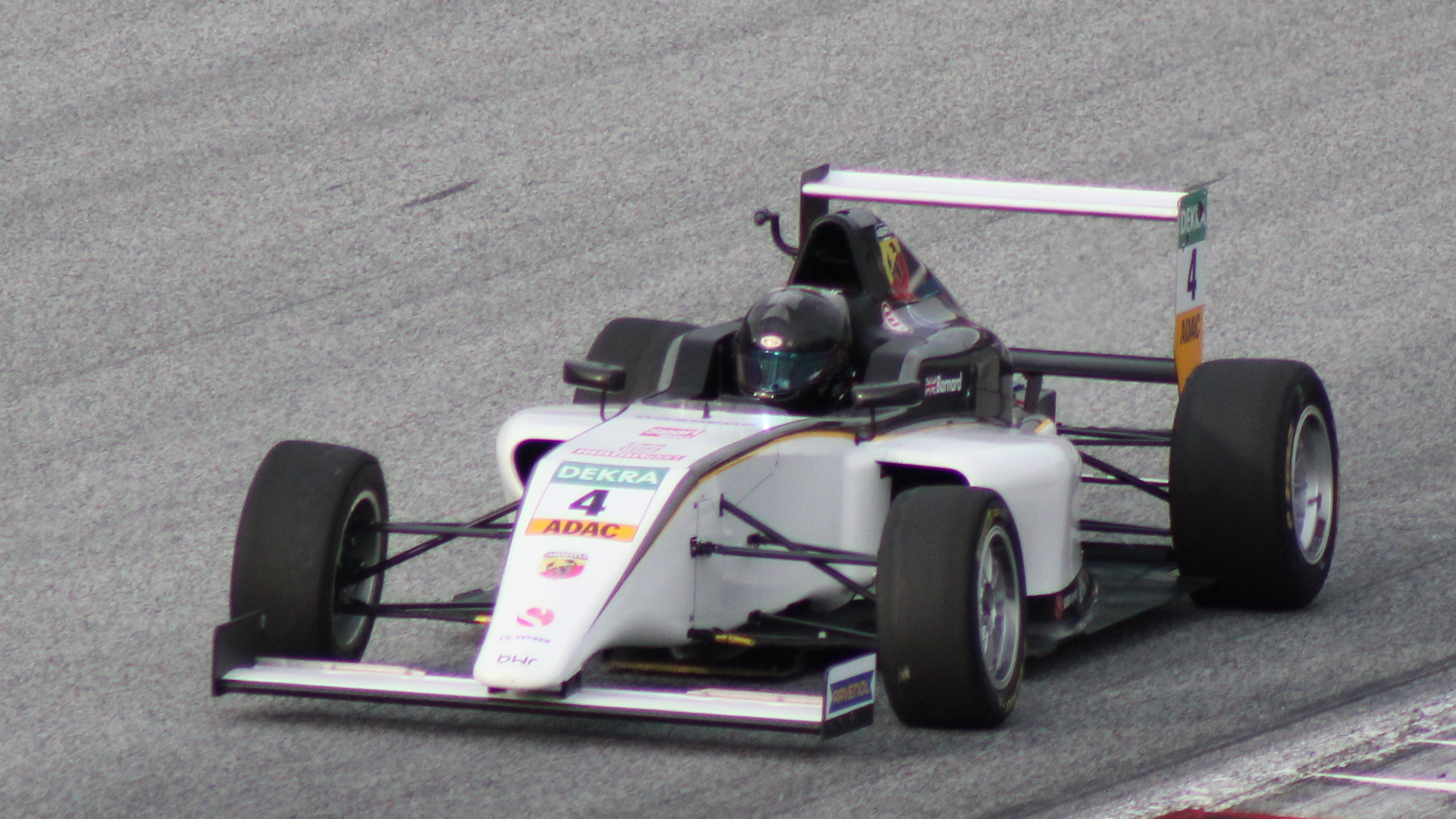
Barnard racing in the 2021 ADAC Formula 4 Championship at the Red Bull Ring.

For 2021, Barnard partnered up with BWR Motorsports, a team affiliated with his mentor Nico Rosberg, to compete in the ADAC Formula 4 Championship. However, following just three rounds, in which Barnard took a best result of fourth, the team was forced to miss two events, only returning for the season finale. Because of this, the Briton finished 17th in the championship, taking 17 points.

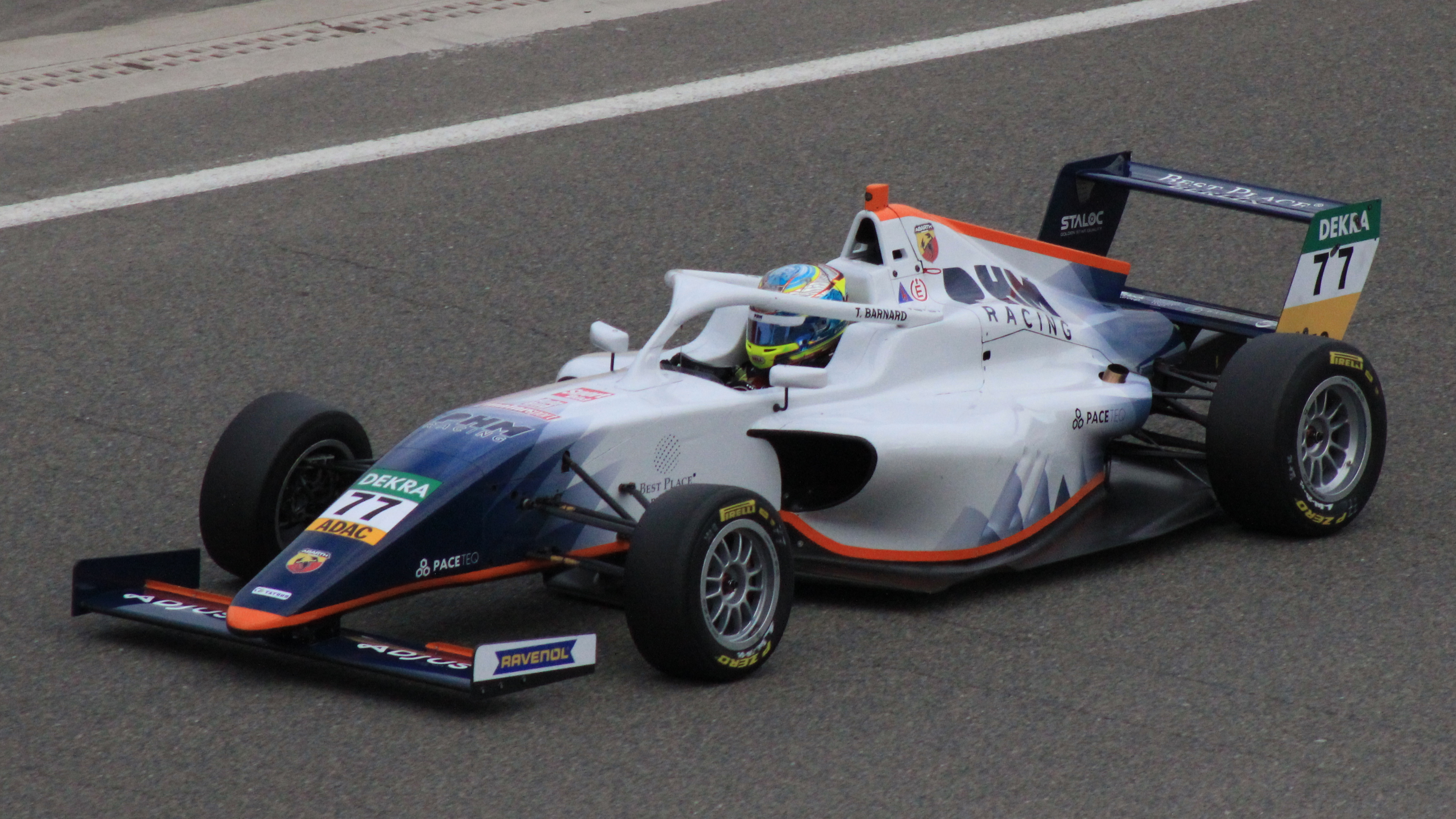
Barnard racing in the 2022 ADAC Formula 4 Championship at Spa-Francorchamps.

Nevertheless, Barnard remained in Formula 4 the following year, driving for newly-formed team PHM Racing alongside Nikita Bedrin and Jonas Ried. He began the year by competing in the F4 UAE Championship in January, taking his and his team's first win in car racing at the Yas Marina Circuit. The rest of the campaign was plagued by reliability issues relating to the car, as Barnard ended up ninth overall.

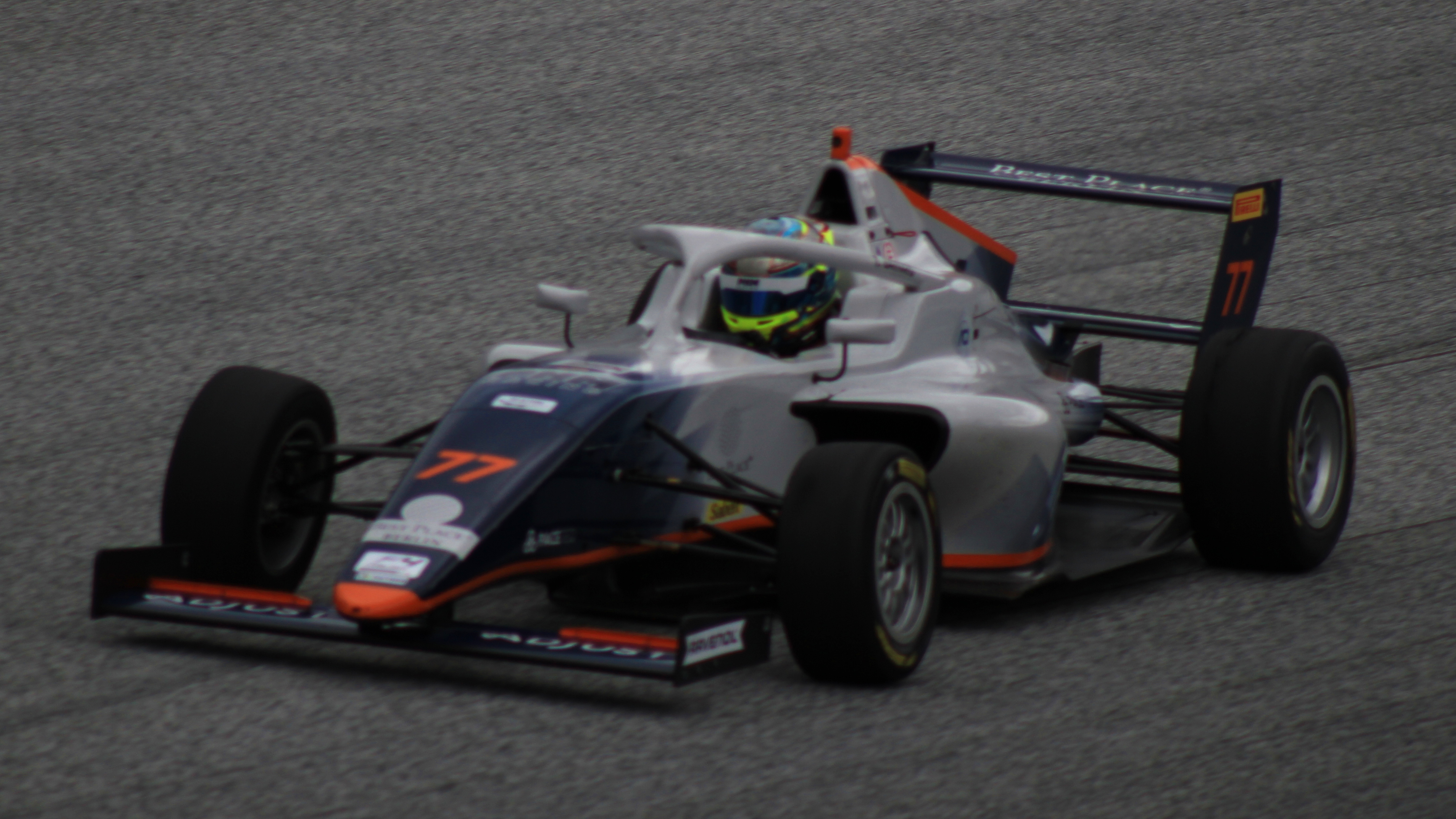
Barnard racing in the 2022 Italian F4 Championship at the Red Bull Ring.

Barnard's main campaign would lie in the Italian F4 and ADAC Formula 4 series, which he would once again contest with PHM. In the former, Barnard took one podium at Vallelunga Circuit and finished eighth in the standings, whilst in the latter, his campaign would be more successful. Having started out with two sixth places and a collision with teammate Ried at Spa-Francorchamps, the Briton experienced a more positive weekend in Hockenheim, taking a pair of podiums. Following more points finishes at Circuit Zandvoort, the event at the Nürburgring became a turning point for Barnard. After taking his first victory of the season in Race 1, owing to a five-second penalty to leader Andrea Kimi Antonelli for a jump start, Barnard fended off his Italian rival in Race 2, scoring another win. With championship leader Antonelli absent at the penultimate round at the Lausitzring, Barnard would capitalise, winning two races and finishing second in Race 1, in a weekend characterised by a number of battles with his teammate Bedrin. Despite this, Barnard would be unable to take the title, although another pair of podiums at the season finale, including a victory in the final race, meant that Barnard became the championship runner-up.

=== Formula Regional ===
During the opening months of 2023, Barnard competed in the inaugural Formula Regional Middle East Championship with PHM Racing. After taking two podium places in the opening round at Dubai Autodrome, he took his first race victory in the second round at Kuwait Motor Town. He originally finished the race in second position, but was promoted to the win after race winner Joshua Dufek was disqualified due to a technical infringement. A second win followed at the next round, also held in Kuwait, before he took three podium places in the penultimate round in Dubai. Barnard went into the final round at Yas Marina Circuit with a chance of the championship title, but two disappointing finishes outside of the points in the first two races meant he ultimately finished as runner-up in the championship to Kimi Antonelli.

Barnard competed in the championship again in the 2024 season with PHM AIX Racing, where he once again finished as the runner up. He finished the season with 176 points, which was 79 points behind champion Tuukka Taponen. Throughout the season, Barnard secured four pole positions and five race wins. During the first race of the season at the Yas Marina Circuit, Barnard took the season's first victory after starting from pole position. His second victory was inherited the next day during Race 3 after original race winner Martinius Stenshorne received a penalty. However, his titles hopes were hampered during the second round in the second Yas Marina round where he managed only one podium while Taponen won twice. Barnard's third win came following a pole position start and a close race with Taponen during the opening race of Round 3 at the Dubai Autodrome. During Round 4, Barnard managed to claim his fourth win after yet another narrow victory over Taponen. During the penultimate race in Round 5, Barnard secured his fifth win of the season and seventh overall win in the series.

=== FIA Formula 3 ===
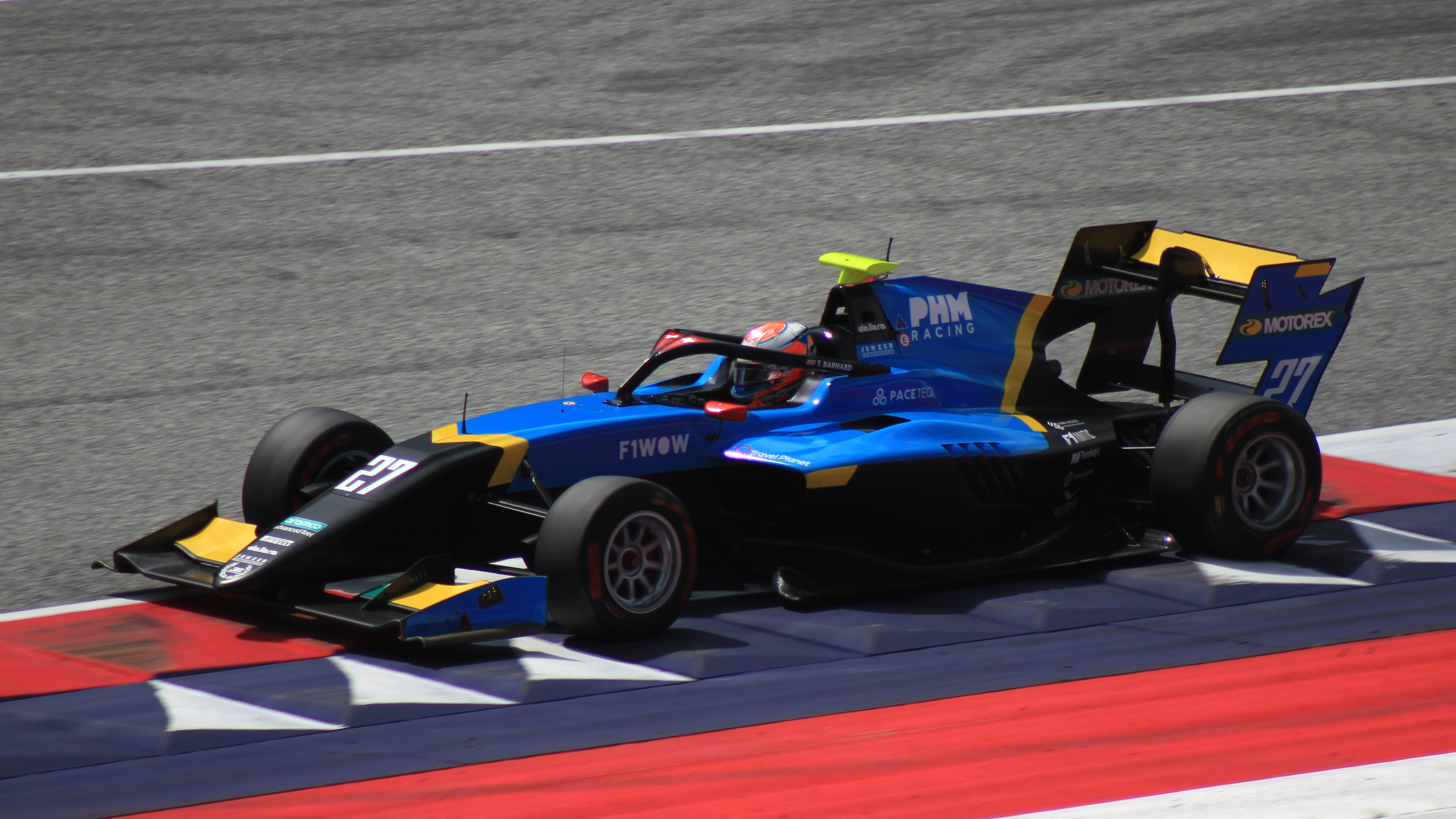
Barnard driving the Dallara F3 2019 during the 2023 Spielberg Formula 3 round

In the autumn of 2022, Barnard, along with his Formula 4 teammate Nikita Bedrin and Euroformula Open driver Alex García, took part in the 2022 FIA Formula 3 post-season test for Jenzer Motorsport. In January 2023, Barnard was announced as the final driver for Jenzer Motorsport to complete its lineup for the 2023 season, alongside Bedrin and García. He was pointless during the Bahrain season opener, but he would score scored his first points in the Melbourne feature race where he finished ninth, marking a run of five consecutive points-scoring positions. He made the top 12 in Monaco for the first time with ninth, and scored points in both races with fifth and eighth place. He then impressed in Barcelona round by qualifying on the front row. After finishing ninth in the sprint, Barnard maintained his position in the earlier stages of the race but ultimately was unable to cope with the faster cars and he slipped to ninth.

In the Silverstone sprint race, Barnard moved up to second at the start and was in contention for the win but he tagged Sebastián Montoya into a spin, causing Barnard to lose places and he eventually finished in 30th place. Qualifying tenth for the Spa-Francorchamps round, Barnard took his first podium in the series as he finished in second place. The following day, he proceeded to take his maiden Formula 3 victory in the feature race following a right call on strategy, as he held off Christian Mansell in a race that took place in mixed conditions. The final round in Monza saw another impressive showing from Barnard, as he placed fourth and third in the races, taking another podium in the latter amidst multiple battles. His late run of form allowed Barnard to finish tenth in the championship standings, taking 72 points and three podiums throughout the season.

In September 2023, Barnard was named as one of four nominees for the Aston Martin Autosport BRDC Award, alongside Formula 4 racer Arvid Lindblad and GB3 Championship drivers Callum Voisin and Joseph Loake.

=== FIA Formula 2 ===
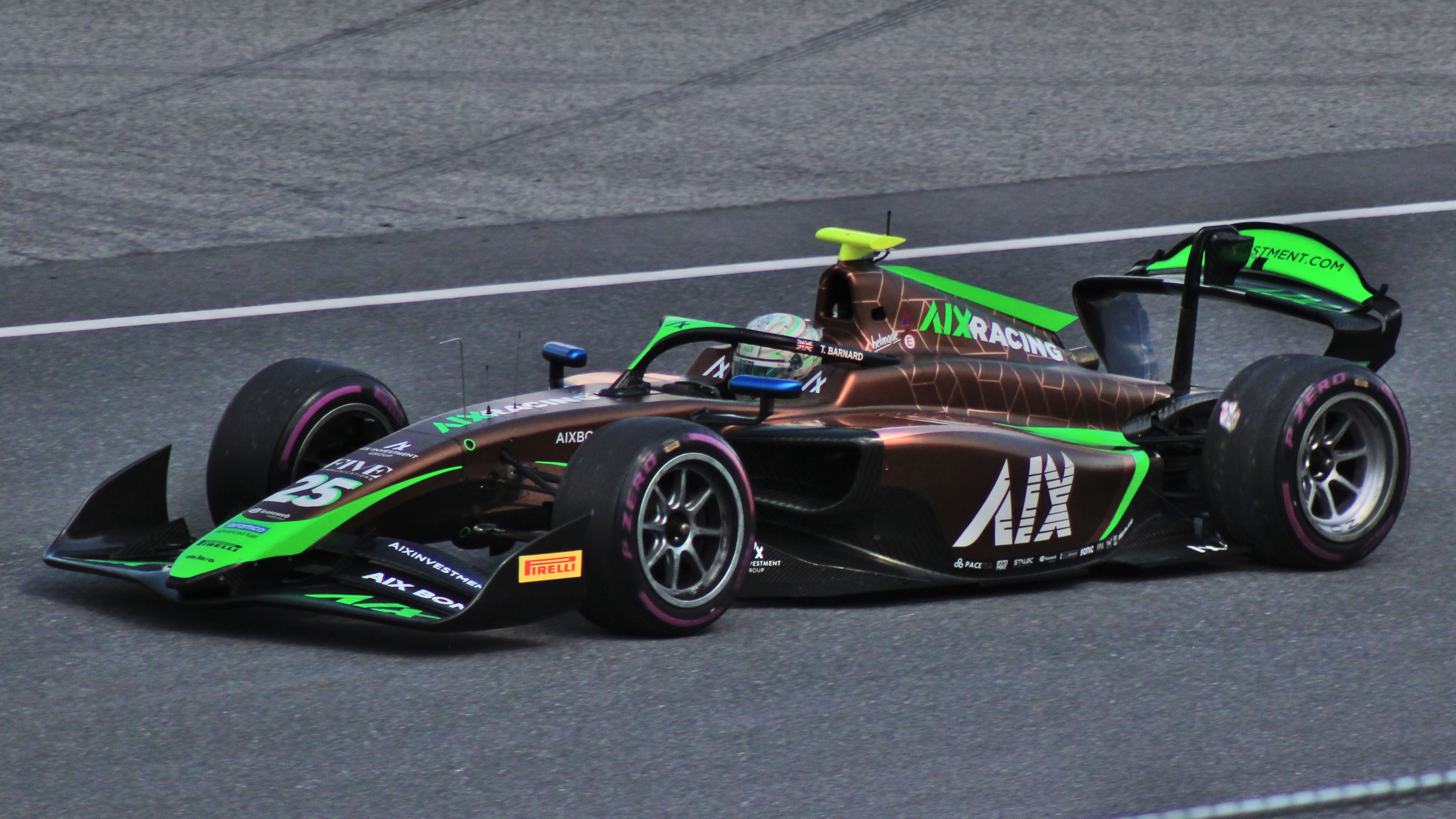
Barnard driving the Dallara F2 2024 during the 2024 Spielberg Formula 2 round

In February 2024, it was announced that Barnard would graduate to the 2024 season of the FIA Formula 2 Championship with PHM AIX Racing partnering Joshua Dürksen. He qualified ninth in the Bahrain opener and started second for the sprint, but dropped down the order rapidly at the start, before retiring due to brake issues. He only scored his first points finish of the series with seventh place during round 4 in Imola, following a multi-car pileup on the opening lap. However, he was later disqualified over an alleged failure to engage the start set-up procedure on the formation lap. Barnard redeemed himself in Monaco by proceeding to take his maiden victory in the sprint race after qualifying on reverse pole. Barnard secured his best qualifying of the year with sixth in Austria, and scored his feature race points with eighth place. Barnard then scored double points in Budapest, with seventh and ninth place in the sprint and feature races respectively, despite qualifying in 17th.

During the summer break, Barnard signed to compete for McLaren in the 2024–25 season of Formula E and subsequently ended his Formula 2 campaign prior to the Monza round. At the end of the season, Barnard placed 21st in the overall standings with 18 points.

== Formula E ==
=== McLaren (2023–2025) ===
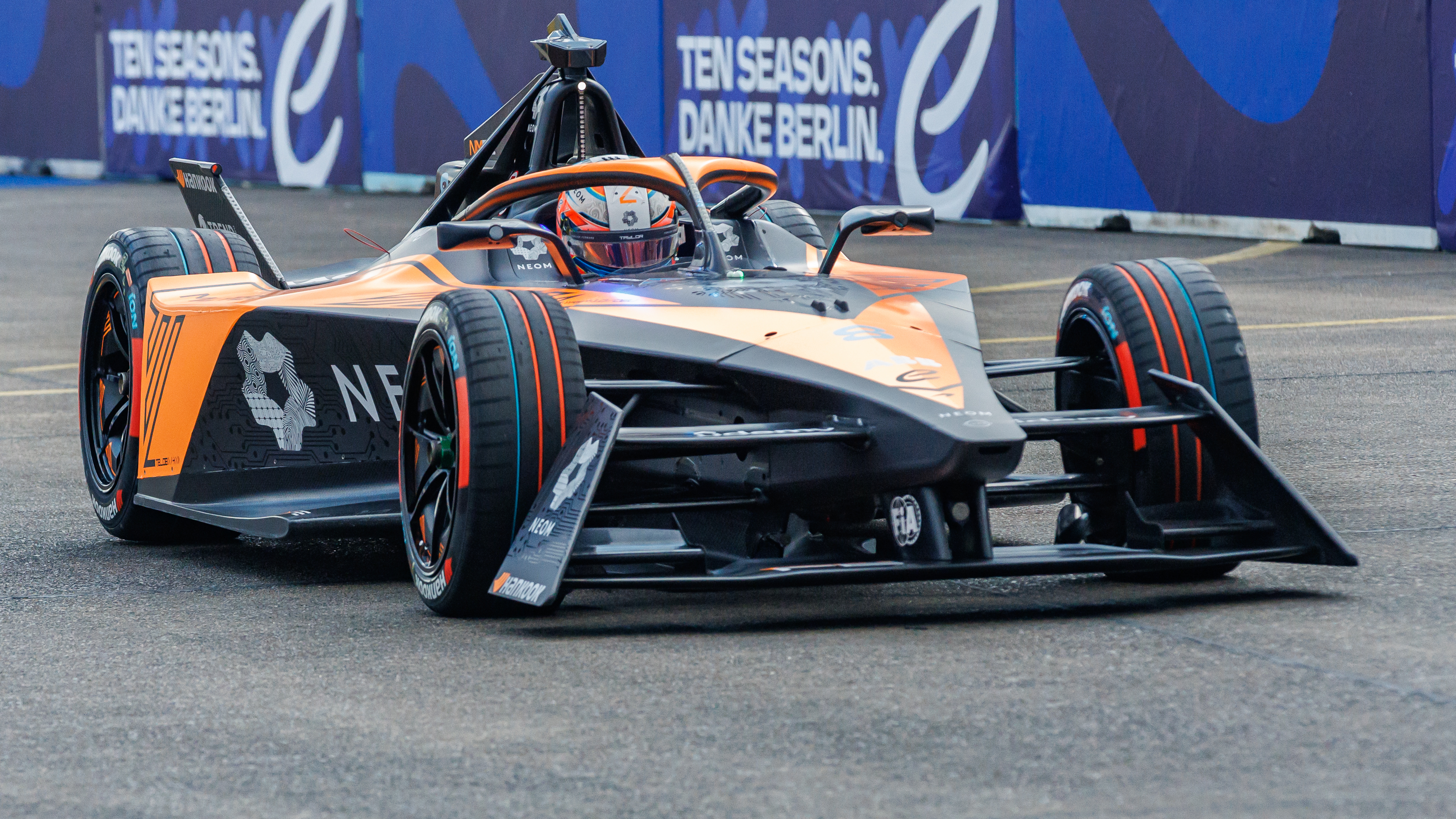
Barnard with McLaren at the 2024 Berlin ePrix

In October 2023, Barnard took part in pre-season testing for the 2023–24 season of Formula E with McLaren as part of a mandatory rookie test. He took part in the opening session of the test and finished in seventh place, just under half a second from the fastest time set by Mitch Evans. He also finished the session as the fastest rookie driver. In January 2024, Barnard was signed as McLaren's reserve and development driver for the season. Barnard made his Formula E debut at the Monaco ePrix from FP2 onwards to deputise Sam Bird, who suffered a hand injury from a crash in FP1. He qualified in 22nd and finished his debut race in 14th while becoming the youngest driver to start an ePrix at 19 years and 331 days. Barnard continued to deputise for Bird at the Berlin ePrix, where he finished Race 1 in tenth to score his first Formula E points while becoming the youngest point scorer. He ended the double-header weekend by finishing Race 2 in eighth.

After the departure of Jake Hughes to Maserati MSG at the end of the 2023–24 season, Barnard was promoted as a full time driver and partnered Sam Bird for the 2024–25 season. Barnard qualified 17th at the season opening São Paulo ePrix and finished the race in third. In doing so, Barnard won his first podium in his maiden race as a full-time driver and became the youngest podium finisher at the age of 20 years and 189 days. He followed up with another podium finish by coming in third at Race 1 of the Jeddah ePrix. At Race 2, he scored his first pole position, becoming the youngest polesitter at the age of 20 years 259 days but failed to convert it to a win, finishing the race in second. Barnard secured two additional podiums, with third place finishes at Tokyo and Shanghai. He finished his first full-time season in fourth in the Drivers' Championship and departed from McLaren as the team exited Formula E at the end of the season.

=== DS Penske (2025–2026) ===
In September 2025, DS Penske announced the signing of Barnard, who will partner Maximilian Günther for the 2025–26 season, replacing Jean-Éric Vergne. At the season finale, Barnard became the youngest race winner in the series by winning Race 2 of the London ePrix. He finished 11th in the drivers standings with 68 points. After the end of the season, Fortescue Zero bought out Penske and formed Fortescue Zero Racing following DS Automobiles deciding to pull out of Formula E.

=== Fortescue Zero Racing (2026–present) ===
In October 2026, Barnard was announced as Fortescue Zero Racing's first driver signing as it enters the 2026–27 season. In the following month, it was reported that Barnard was seeking to invalidate his contract with Fortescue Zero to explore other options in Formula E. As a result, Barnard did not attend Fortescue Zero's official team launch. At the Circuito del Jarama pre-season testing, Barnard tested for the newly formed Fusion Formula E Team and was left out in the official season entry list. Fortescue Zero announced its disappointment with the situation and that Barnard is still signed to the team. In the final hour of the third and final day of testing, Barnard's car began smoking and caught fire before it exploded. Barnard managed to exit the car before it caught fire.

== Karting record ==
=== Karting career summary ===
Season	Series	Team	Position
2012	Trent Valley Kart Club — Comer Cadet		10th
2013	LGM Series — IAME Cadet		28th
2013	Trent Valley Kart Club — IAME Cadet		14th
2013	Kartmasters British Grand Prix — IAME Cadet		18th
2014	Trent Valley Kart Club — IAME Cadet		**3rd**
2014	Kartmasters British Grand Prix — IAME Cadet		NC
2014	Super 1 National Championship — IAME Cadet	AIM Motorsport	15th
2015	LGM Series — IAME Cadet		11th
2015	Kartmasters British Grand Prix — IAME Cadet		**1st**
2015	Super 1 National Championship — IAME Cadet	AIM Motorsport	5th
2016	LGM Series — IAME Cadet		4th
2016	Super 1 National Championship — IAME Cadet		7th
2016	MSA Kartmasters British Grand Prix — IAME Cadet		8th
2016	ABkC British Open Championship — IAME Cadet		**2nd**
2017	LGM Series — IAME Cadet		**1st**
2017	Super 1 National Championship — IAME Cadet	Fusion Motorsport	**1st**
2017	Kartmasters British Grand Prix — IAME Cadet	Fusion Motorsport	**1st**
2017	SKUSA SuperNationals — Mini Swift	Team Benik	6th
2018	WSK Champions Cup — OKJ	TB Racing Team	30th
2018	South Garda Winter Cup — OKJ	KR Motorsport	9th
2018	WSK Super Master Series — OKJ	KR Motorsport	5th
2018	WSK Open Cup — OKJ	KR Motorsport	7th
2018	CIK-FIA European Championship — OKJ	KR Motorsport	22nd
2018	CIK-FIA World Championship — OKJ	KR Motorsport	4th
2018	IAME International Final — X30 Junior	KR Motorsport	4th
2018	WSK Final Cup — OKJ	KR Motorsport	**1st**
2019	WSK Champions Cup — OK	Rosberg Racing Academy	**1st**
2019	South Garda Winter Cup — OK	Rosberg Racing Academy	11th
2019	WSK Super Master Series — OK	Rosberg Racing Academy	**2nd**
2019	WSK Euro Series — OK	Rosberg Racing Academy	6th
2019	Italian Championship — OK	Rosberg Racing Academy	12th
2019	CIK-FIA European Championship — OK	Rosberg Racing Academy	4th
2019	CIK-FIA World Championship — OK	Rosberg Racing Academy	**2nd**
2019	IAME International Final — X30 Pro	Rosberg Racing Academy	6th
2019	WSK Open Cup — OK	Rosberg Racing Academy	**1st**
2019	WSK Final Cup — OK	Rosberg Racing Academy	6th
2019	SKUSA SuperNationals — X30 Senior	Kartsport North America	NC
2020	SKUSA Winter Series — X30 Senior		NC
2020	WSK Champions Cup — OK	Rosberg Racing Academy	**1st**
2020	South Garda Winter Cup — OK	Rosberg Racing Academy	10th
2020	WSK Super Master Series — OK	Rosberg Racing Academy	5th
2020	CIK-FIA International Super Cup — KZ2	Rosberg Racing Academy	NC
2020	CIK-FIA European Championship — OK	Rosberg Racing Academy	**2nd**
2020	WSK Euro Series — OK	Rosberg Racing Academy	15th
2020	Champions of the Future — OK	Rosberg Racing Academy	6th
2020	CIK-FIA World Championship — OK	Rosberg Racing Academy	5th
2020	WSK Open Cup — OK	Rosberg Racing Academy	**1st**

=== Complete CIK-FIA Karting European Championship results ===
(key) (Races in bold indicate pole position) (Races in italics indicate fastest lap)

Year	Team	Class	1	2	3	4	5	6	7	8	DC	Points
2018	KR Motorsport	OKJ	SAR; QH; 17	SAR; R 8	PFI; QH; 27	PFI; R 28	AMP; QH; 19	AMP; R 16	AUB; QH; 13	AUB; R 25	22nd	8
2019	Rosberg Racing Academy	OK	ANG; QH; 5	ANG; R 4	GEN; QH; 47	GEN; R DNQ	KRI; QH; 7	KRI; R 6	LEM; QH; 12	LEM; R 3	4th	49
2020	Rosberg Racing Academy	OK	ZUE; QH; 1	**ZUE**; **R** 2	SAR; QH; 1	**SAR**; **R** 1	WAC; QH (9)	WAC; R (6)			2nd	65

=== Complete Karting World Championship results ===
Year	Team	Class	Quali Heats	Main race
2018	(Italy) KR Motorsport	OKJ	**1st**	**4th**
2019	(Italy) Rosberg Racing Academy	OK	6th	**2nd**
2020	(Italy) Rosberg Racing Academy	OK	**1st**	**5th**

== Racing record ==
=== Racing career summary ===
Season	Series	Team	Races	Wins	Poles	F/Laps	Podiums	Points	Position
2020	Italian F4 Championship	AKM Motorsport	8	0	0	0	0	2	26th
2021	ADAC Formula 4 Championship	BWR Motorsports	12	0	0	0	0	17	17th
2021	Drexler Automotive Formula 4 Cup	BWR Motorsports	2	0	0	1	1	28	5th
2022	Formula 4 UAE Championship	PHM Racing	20	1	0	0	1	80	9th
2022	Italian F4 Championship	PHM Racing	20	0	0	0	1	103	8th
2022	ADAC Formula 4 Championship	PHM Racing	18	5	3	3	10	266	**2nd**
2023	Formula Regional Middle East Championship	PHM Racing	15	2	0	3	7	152	**2nd**
2023	FIA Formula 3 Championship	Jenzer Motorsport	18	1	0	0	3	72	10th
2023–24	Formula E	NEOM McLaren Formula E Team	3	0	0	0	0	5	22nd
2024	Formula Regional Middle East Championship	PHM AIX Racing	15	5	4	1	6	176	**2nd**
2024	FIA Formula 2 Championship	AIX Racing	20	1	0	0	1	18	21st
2024–25	Formula E	NEOM McLaren Formula E Team	16	0	2	1	5	112	4th
2025–26	Formula E	DS Penske	17	1	0	0	1	68	11th
2026–27	Formula E	Fusion Formula E Team	Test driver						
2026–27	Formula E	Fortescue Zero Racing	0	0	0	0	0	0	TBD

* Season still in progress.

=== Complete Italian F4 Championship results ===
(key) (Races in bold indicate pole position) (Races in italics indicate fastest lap)

Year	Team	1	2	3	4	5	6	7	8	9	10	11	12	13	14	15	16	17	18	19	20	21	22	DC	Points
2020	AKM Motorsport	MIS; 1	MIS; 2	MIS; 3	IMO1; 1	IMO1; 2	IMO1; 3	RBR; 1	RBR; 2	RBR; 3	MUG; 1; 11	MUG; 2; 15	MUG; 3; 24	MNZ; 1; 21†	MNZ; 2; 9	MNZ; 3; 17	IMO2; 1	IMO2; 2	IMO2; 3	VLL; 1; 17	VLL; 2 C	VLL; 3; 29		26th	2
2022	PHM Racing	IMO; 1; 6	IMO; 2; 10	IMO; 3; 4	MIS; 1 Ret	MIS; 2; 12	MIS; 3; 9	SPA; 1; 7	SPA; 2; 31†	SPA; 3; 9	VLL; 1; 5	VLL; 2; 2	VLL; 3; 5	RBR; 1; 22	RBR; 2	RBR; 3; 13	RBR; 4; 9	MNZ; 1; 5	MNZ; 2; 4	MNZ; 3 C	MUG; 1; 9	MUG; 2; 14	MUG; 3; 6	8th	103

=== Complete ADAC Formula 4 Championship results ===
(key) (Races in bold indicate pole position) (Races in italics indicate fastest lap)

Year	Team	1	2	3	4	5	6	7	8	9	10	11	12	13	14	15	16	17	18	Pos	Points
2021	BWR Motorsports	RBR; 1; 14	RBR; 2; 13	RBR; 3; 4	ZAN; 1; 14	ZAN; 2 Ret	ZAN; 3; 9	HOC1; 1 Ret	HOC1; 2; 12	HOC1; 3; 10	SAC; 1	SAC; 2	SAC; 3	HOC2; 1	HOC2; 2	HOC2; 3	NÜR; 1; 11	NÜR; 2; 11	NÜR; 3; 14	17th	17
2022	PHM Racing	SPA; 1; 6	SPA; 2; 6	SPA; 3; 15	HOC; 1; 3	HOC; 2; 4	HOC; 3; 3	ZAN; 1; 6	ZAN; 2; 6	ZAN; 3; 4	NÜR1; 1; 1	**NÜR1**; **2**; 1	NÜR1; 3; 3	**LAU**; **1**; 2	**LAU**; **2**; 1	LAU; 3; 1	NÜR2; 1; 4	NÜR2; 2; 2	NÜR2; 3; 1	2nd	266

=== Complete Formula 4 UAE Championship results ===
(key) (Races in bold indicate pole position) (Races in italics indicate fastest lap)

Year	Team	1	2	3	4	5	6	7	8	9	10	11	12	13	14	15	16	17	18	19	20	Pos	Points
2022	PHM Racing	YMC1; 1; 12	YMC1; 2; 8	YMC1; 3; 6	YMC1; 4; 1	DUB1; 1; 6	DUB1; 2; 8	DUB1; 3; 16	DUB1; 4 Ret	DUB2; 1; 7	DUB2; 2 Ret	DUB2; 3 Ret	DUB2; 4; 13	DUB3; 1 Ret	DUB3; 2; 9	DUB3; 3; 6	DUB3; 4; 15	YMC2; 1; 6	YMC2; 2; 7	YMC2; 3; 21	YMC2; 4; 10	9th	80

=== Complete Formula Regional Middle East Championship results ===
(key) (Races in bold indicate pole position) (Races in italics indicate fastest lap)

Year	Entrant	1	2	3	4	5	6	7	8	9	10	11	12	13	14	15	DC	Points
2023	PHM Racing	DUB1; 1; 3	DUB1; 2; 3	DUB1; 3 Ret	KUW1; 1; 14	KUW1; 2; 1	KUW1; 3 Ret	KUW2; 1; 4	KUW2; 2; 24†	KUW2; 3; 1	DUB2; 1; 3	DUB2; 2; 3	DUB2; 3; 2	ABU; 1; 14	ABU; 2; 18	ABU; 3; 4	2nd	152
2024	PHM AIX Racing	**YMC1**; **1**; 1	YMC1; 2; 8	**YMC1**; **3**; 1	YMC2; 1; 16	YMC2; 2; 22†	YMC2; 3; 3	**DUB1**; **1**; 1	DUB1; 2; 8	DUB1; 3; 4	**YMC3**; **1**; 1	YMC3; 2; 14	YMC3; 3; 5	DUB2; 1; 8	DUB2; 2; 1	DUB2; 3; 9	2nd	176

† – Driver did not finish the race but was classified, as he completed more than 90% of the race distance.

=== Complete FIA Formula 3 Championship results ===
(key) (Races in bold indicate pole position) (Races in italics indicate fastest lap)

Year	Entrant	1	2	3	4	5	6	7	8	9	10	11	12	13	14	15	16	17	18	DC	Points
2023	Jenzer Motorsport	BHR; SPR; 14	BHR; FEA; 16	MEL; SPR; 12	MEL; FEA; 9	MON; SPR; 5	MON; FEA; 8	CAT; SPR; 9	CAT; FEA; 9	RBR; SPR; 27	RBR; FEA; 12	SIL; SPR; 30	SIL; FEA; 21	HUN; SPR; 11	HUN; FEA; 14	SPA; SPR; 2	SPA; FEA; 1	MNZ; SPR; 4	MNZ; FEA; 3	10th	72

=== Complete FIA Formula 2 Championship results ===
(key) (Races in bold indicate pole position) (Races in italics indicate fastest lap)

Year	Entrant	1	2	3	4	5	6	7	8	9	10	11	12	13	14	15	16	17	18	19	20	21	22	23	24	25	26	27	28	DC	Points
2024	AIX Racing	BHR; SPR; Ret	BHR; FEA; 16	JED; SPR; 13	JED; FEA; 13	MEL; SPR; 13	MEL; FEA; 16	IMO; SPR; DSQ	IMO; FEA; 20	MON; SPR; 1	MON; FEA; 11	CAT; SPR; 19	CAT; FEA; Ret	RBR; SPR; 12	RBR; FEA; 8	SIL; SPR; 9	SIL; FEA; 14	HUN; SPR; 7	HUN; FEA; 9	SPA; SPR; 16	SPA; FEA; 13	MNZ; SPR	MNZ; FEA	BAK; SPR	BAK; FEA	LSL; SPR	LSL; FEA	YMC; SPR	YMC; FEA	21st	18

=== Complete Formula E results ===
(key) (Races in bold indicate pole position; races in italics indicate points for the fastest lap of the top-10 finishers)

Year	Entrant	Chassis	Powertrain	1	2	3	4	5	6	7	8	9	10	11	12	13	14	15	16	17	Pos	Points
2023–24	NEOM McLaren Formula E Team	Spark Gen3	Nissan e-4ORCE 04	MEX	DRH	DRH	SAP	TOK	MIS	MIS	MCO; 14	BER; 10	BER; 8	SHA	SHA	POR	POR	LDN	LDN		22nd	5
2024–25	NEOM McLaren Formula E Team	Spark Gen3 Evo	Nissan e-4ORCE 05	SAO; 3	MEX; 14	JED; 3	**JED**; 2	MIA; 20	**MCO**; 15	MCO; 16	TKO; 3	TKO; Ret	SHA; 3	SHA; 10	JKT; 7	BER; 4	BER; 6	LDN; 16	LDN; Ret		4th	112
2025–26	DS Penske	Formula E Gen3 Evo	DS E-Tense FE25	SAO; 13†	MEX; 4	MIA; 14	JED; 10	JED; 10	MAD; 18	BER; 8	BER; 11	MCO; 7	MCO; 15	SAN; 9	SHA; 16	SHA; 9	TKO; 10	TKO; 9	LDN; 5	LDN; 1	11th	68

* Season still in progress.
