= 2026–27 Formula E World Championship =

Motorsport racing series

The 2026–27 ABB FIA Formula E World Championship will be the thirteenth season of the FIA Formula E championship, a motor racing championship for electrically powered vehicles recognised by motorsport's governing body, the Fédération Internationale de l'Automobile (FIA), as the highest class of competition for electric open-wheel racing cars. It will begin in January 2027 and end in July 2027.

The 2026–27 season will see a major overhaul in its technical ruleset as the Formula E Gen3 Evo package will be replaced by the Formula E Gen4 car.

== Teams and drivers ==
All teams will use the Formula E Gen4 car on Bridgestone tyres.

Team	Powertrain	No.	Drivers	Rounds
(Germany) Porsche Formula E Team	Porsche 975 RSE	1	(Germany) Pascal Wehrlein	TBC
(Germany) Porsche Formula E Team	Porsche 975 RSE	51	(Switzerland) Nico Müller	TBC
(United States) Cupra Kiro	Porsche 975 RSE	3	(Spain) Pepe Martí	TBC
(United States) Cupra Kiro	Porsche 975 RSE	33	(United Kingdom) Jake Hughes	TBC
(Germany) Opel GSE Formula E Team	Opel GSE 27FE	4	(New Zealand) Mitch Evans	TBC
(Germany) Opel GSE Formula E Team	Opel GSE 27FE	12	(France) Théo Pourchaire	TBC
(United Kingdom) Jaguar TCS Racing	Jaguar I-Type 08	5	(Belgium) Stoffel Vandoorne	TBC
(United Kingdom) Jaguar TCS Racing	Jaguar I-Type 08	13	(Portugal) António Félix da Costa	TBC
(United Kingdom) Paysafe Envision Formula E Team	Jaguar I-Type 08	7	(Germany) Maximilian Günther	TBC
(United Kingdom) Paysafe Envision Formula E Team	Jaguar I-Type 08	15	(United Kingdom) Zak O'Sullivan	TBC
(United Kingdom) Lola Formula E Team	Lola T004	11	(Brazil) Enzo Fittipaldi	TBC
(United Kingdom) Lola Formula E Team	Lola T004	35	(Israel) Robert Shwartzman	TBC
(Australia) Fortescue Zero Racing	Jaguar I-Type 08	20	(United Kingdom) Dan Ticktum	TBC
(Australia) Fortescue Zero Racing	Jaguar I-Type 08	30	TBA	TBC
(India) Mahindra Racing	M13Electro	21	(Netherlands) Nyck de Vries	TBC
(India) Mahindra Racing	M13Electro	48	(Switzerland) Edoardo Mortara	TBC
(Japan) Nissan Formula E Team	Nissan e-4ORCE 06	22	(Barbados) Zane Maloney	TBC
(Japan) Nissan Formula E Team	Nissan e-4ORCE 06	23	(United Kingdom) Oliver Rowland	TBC
(France) Citroën Racing	Citroën Racing ë-CX	25	(France) Jean-Éric Vergne	TBC
(France) Citroën Racing	Citroën Racing ë-CX	37	(New Zealand) Nick Cassidy	TBC
(United Kingdom) Fusion Formula E Team	Porsche 975 RSE	26	TBA	TBC
(United Kingdom) Fusion Formula E Team	Porsche 975 RSE	90	(Turkey) Ayhancan Güven	TBC
(United States) Andretti Formula E	Nissan e-4ORCE 06	27	(United Kingdom) Jake Dennis	TBC
(United States) Andretti Formula E	Nissan e-4ORCE 06	28	(Brazil) Felipe Drugovich	TBC

=== Team changes ===
Stellantis withdrew its DS Automobiles brand from Formula E after 11 seasons, ending a partnership with Penske Autosport that had lasted for the last four. Opel will enter a 12th team, Opel GSE Formula E Team, joining Citroën as the two Stellantis representatives. The Penske operation was acquired by Australian mining and energy company Fortescue, who will enter as Fortescue Zero Racing using Jaguar powertrains.

In November 2025, Porsche stated its intent to field a second factory team for Season 13 after halting its FIA World Endurance Championship programme. In September 2026, the project was paralysed and turned to a new customer team, later named Fusion Formula E Team.

Andretti Global ended its partnership with Porsche after four seasons and switched to Nissan powertrains for Season 13 onwards, replacing the customer slot previously used by the former McLaren team.

Online payments company Paysafe was announced as the title sponsor of Envision Racing, renamed as Paysafe Envision Racing for Season 13.

Lola Cars ended its partnership with the Abt Sportsline team after two seasons and ran its cars from a newly expanded Silverstone base.

=== Driver changes ===
The Lola Formula E Team will have an all-new lineup. Lucas di Grassi, the only driver to have entered every Formula E event, announced his retirement from professional motorsport despite having a contract with the team, while Zane Maloney also departed the team after two seasons to join the Nissan Formula E Team. At Nissan, Maloney will replace Norman Nato, who parted ways the team after three seasons. Lola replaced their lineup with two rookies in 2025 Indianapolis 500 pole-sitter Robert Shwartzman and 2026 Indy NXT runner-up Enzo Fittipaldi.

Despite having a contract, Joel Eriksson left Envision Racing, having spent just a single full-time season at the team. Sébastien Buemi also stepped down as a driver, effectively retiring from Formula E after twelve seasons and a championship title, but remained with Envision in an advisory role. Envision signed Maximilian Günther, who left DS Penske after 4 years in the Stellantis stable, and promoted its simulator driver Zak O'Sullivan, who previously raced in Super Formula with Team Impul, to a race seat.

New team Opel GSE Formula E Team will field Mitch Evans, who departed Jaguar TCS Racing after ten seasons. The team's lineup will be completed by 2023 Formula 2 champion and Peugeot Hypercar driver Théo Pourchaire, who will make his Formula E debut after rookie tests with Maserati and Citroën in past seasons. To replace Evans, Jaguar fielded 2021–22 champion Stoffel Vandoorne, who was previously a reserve driver for the team in the 2025–26 season.

Dan Ticktum left Cupra Kiro after five seasons to join the new Fortescue Zero Racing, where he was to be joined by former DS Penske driver Taylor Barnard. However, due to a contractual disagreement between the team and Barnard, he was initially left off the season entry list.

Jake Hughes replaced Ticktum in Cupra Kiro. Hughes most recently competed as a full-time driver for Maserati MSG Racing in the 2024–25 season and served as a reserve driver for Mahindra in the majority of the 2025–26 season.

The new Fusion Formula E Team intends to field 2025 DTM champion and Porsche factory driver Ayhancan Güven on his Formula E debut.

== Calendar ==
The official calendar was released on 23 June 2026. The following ePrix are contracted to form the 2026–27 Formula E World Championship, which will be the longest season in championship history, consisting of 21 races. On 12 November 2026, the FIA announced an update to the calendar, with Jeddah moved to 16 and 17 April 2027 and Sanya brought forward by two weeks to 3 April 2027.

Round	E-Prix	Country	Circuit	Date
1	Mexico City ePrix	Mexico	Autódromo Hermanos Rodríguez	16 January 2027
2	Austin ePrix	United States	Circuit of the Americas	6 February 2027
3	Miami ePrix	United States	Miami International Autodrome	20 February 2027
4	São Paulo ePrix	Brazil	São Paulo Street Circuit	13 March 2027
5	Sanya ePrix	China	Sanya Street Circuit	3 April 2027
6	Jeddah ePrix	Saudi Arabia	Jeddah Corniche Circuit	16 April 2027
7	Jeddah ePrix	Saudi Arabia	Jeddah Corniche Circuit	17 April 2027
8	Monaco ePrix	Monaco	Circuit de Monaco	1 May 2027
9	Monaco ePrix	Monaco	Circuit de Monaco	2 May 2027
10	Berlin ePrix	Germany	Tempelhof Airport Street Circuit	8 May 2027
11	Berlin ePrix	Germany	Tempelhof Airport Street Circuit	9 May 2027
12	British ePrix	United Kingdom	Brands Hatch	29 May 2027
13	British ePrix	United Kingdom	Brands Hatch	30 May 2027
14	Dutch ePrix	Netherlands	Circuit Zandvoort	18 June 2027
15	Dutch ePrix	Netherlands	Circuit Zandvoort	19 June 2027
16	Madrid ePrix	Spain	Circuito del Jarama	26 June 2027
17	Madrid ePrix	Spain	Circuito del Jarama	27 June 2027
18	Shanghai ePrix	China	Shanghai International Circuit	10 July 2027
19	Shanghai ePrix	China	Shanghai International Circuit	11 July 2027
20	Tokyo ePrix	Japan	Tokyo Street Circuit	24 July 2027
21	Tokyo ePrix	Japan	Tokyo Street Circuit	25 July 2027

=== ePrix locations ===
Location of ePrix in season 13
(ePrix only)
(ePrixUnleashed & ePrix)

=== Location changes ===
- Formula E will make its debut at Circuit of the Americas for the inaugural Austin ePrix, at Circuit Zandvoort for the inaugural Zandvoort ePrix, and at Brands Hatch, which will replace the ExCeL London Circuit as the new venue for an ePrix in the UK, also renamed from London ePrix to the British ePrix.
- The Madrid ePrix, which ran a single race in the 2025–26 season, will become a double-header event.

== Regulation changes ==
=== Technical regulations ===
Formula E's fourth generation of technical ruleset will debut in the 2026–27 season. The new Formula E Gen4 car will be the largest, heaviest and most powerful car in series history. It will deliver a maximum of 600kW (804bhp) of power, compared to Gen3's maximum of 350kW (470bhp). Its battery capacity will also be increased by 43%, with drivers now allowed to deploy a maximum of 55kWh throughout a race.

The all-wheel drive that was previously only active during the race start and the attack mode phases will now be active at all times, a first in FIA-sanctioned single-seater motorsport. The cars will also be fitted with an active differential, traction control and anti-lock braking systems.

The new car will also have two different aerodynamic configurations, a high-downforce package and a low-downforce package.

=== Sporting regulations ===
Together with the introduction of the new Gen4 technical framework, the race format for double-header events was changed. The first race of a double-header weekend, now called 'E-PrixUnleashed', will be a 30-minute sprint race without pit stops and with six minutes of attack mode, where the cars will be using the high downforce aero setting they also use in qualifying. The second race of the weekend, just called 'E-Prix', will be a 45-minute race with a mandatory pit stop and eight minutes of attack mode, where the cars will be using the low downforce aero setting.

The Attack Mode can now be paused during a race suspension (Safety car, Full Course Yellow, or red flag) at the driver's instruction. The remaining Attack Mode time resumes once the driver passes through an activation zone, now simply called the 'Attack Zone', again under green-flag conditions.

The points system was also amended, with qualifying now awarding points for every driver that reaches the duel stages, with additional points awarded for winning duels.

== Season report ==
=== Pre-season ===
Ahead of the pre-season test at Circuito del Jarama held from 16 to 20 November 2026, reports emerged that Fortescue Zero Racing’s Taylor Barnard was in a contract dispute to invalidate his contract with the team. As a result, Barnard tested for Fusion Formula E Team whereas Fortescue Zero recruited Alpine F1 Team reserve driver Paul Aron to replace Barnard for the pre-season test. In the final hour of the third and final day of testing, Barnard's car began smoking and caught fire before it exploded. Barnard managed to exit the car before it caught fire. The session was immediately red flagged and prematurely ended as Formula E and FIA investigated the incident.

== Results and standings ==
=== Drivers' Championship ===
Points will be awarded using the following structure:

Position	1st	2nd	3rd	4th	5th	6th	7th	8th	9th	10th	FL
Qualifying points	5 (Note: The winner of the Final Duel receives 4 points for finishing first in the qualifying classification plus 1 additional point for pole position, for a total of 5. The pole position point is not awarded if the driver fails to complete a timed lap in every duel (quarter-final, semi-final, and final), unless the Stewards grant it in exceptional circumstances outside the driver's control.)	3	2	2	1	1	1	1			
Race points	25	18	15	12	10	8	6	4	2	1	1
