= Fusion Formula E Team =

British Formula E team

(United Kingdom) Fusion Formula E Team
- Founded: 2026
- Founder(s): Dan Richards
- Team principal(s): Phil Charles
- Current series: Formula E
- Current drivers: 26. TBA; 90. (Turkey) Ayhancan Güven
- Races: 0
- Wins: 0
- Podiums: 0
- Poles: 0
- Points: 0
- Website: https://www.fusionformulae.com/

The Fusion Formula E Team is a British motor racing team which is set to compete in Formula E. The team is owned by British entrepreneur Dan Richards.

== History ==
In November 2025, Porsche publicly stated its intention to add a second factory team to the grid alongside its existing team, starting the 2026–27 season. The plan for this new team was to act as a "junior team" to help develop drivers and engineers for eventual graduation to the main team. However, plans changed in September 2026 and Porsche abandoned the second factory team project. Porsche already invested in assets for this new team, so they made the decision to sell these assets to an independent customer. Dan Richards' Fusion Racing Group purchased the assets and appeared on the championship entry list initially as NewCo Formula E Team. In November 2026, the team was officially launched as Fusion Formula E Team. Former DS Penske senior personnel Phil Charles and Chris Bluett joined Fusion, with Charles named team principal, and Bluett serving as sporting director.

DS Penske driver Taylor Barnard initially signed with fellow newcomer Fortescue Zero Racing for the 2026–27 season. Barnard, however, attempted to release himself from Fortescue in order to sign with Fusion, later resulting in contract disputes with Fortescue. During the pre-season test at Circuito del Jarama, Barnard and Porsche factory driver Ayhancan Güven drove for Fusion. In the final hour of the third day of testing, Barnard's car caught fire and exploded. Barnard exited his car before it caught fire.

== Results ==
Year	Chassis	Powertrain	Tyres	No.	Drivers	1	2	3	4	5	6	7	8	9	10	11	12	13	14	15	16	17	18	19	20	21	Points	T.C.
Fusion Formula E Team
2026–27	Formula E Gen4	Porsche 975 RSE	B			MEX	COA	MIA	SAO	SYX	JED		MCO		BER		GBR		NED		MAD		SHA		TKO			
2026–27	Formula E Gen4	Porsche 975 RSE	B	26	TBA																							
2026–27	Formula E Gen4	Porsche 975 RSE	B	90	(Turkey) Ayhancan Güven																							

Notes

- ^{G} – Driver was fastest in group qualifying stage and was given one championship point.
- † – Driver did not finish the race, but was classified as he completed over 90% of the race distance.
- * – Season still in progress.

== See also ==
- LN4 Fusion
