= Zandvoort ePrix =

Formula E race in the Netherlands

- Circuit Zandvoort

Race information
- Number of times held: 0
- First held: 2027 (scheduled)

The Zandvoort ePrix is a planned race of the FIA Formula E World Championship, an all-electric single-seater racing series, to be held at Circuit Zandvoort in Zandvoort, Netherlands. The first event is scheduled as a double-header on 18 and 19 June 2027, as rounds 14 and 15 of the 2026–27 Formula E World Championship. It will be the first Formula E event held in the Netherlands.

== History ==
Interest in a Dutch round of Formula E predates the Zandvoort agreement; the city of Eindhoven made an unsuccessful bid to host a race in 2021. In July 2025 it was reported that Formula E was in talks with Circuit Zandvoort about a race from 2027, after the circuit's contract to host the Dutch Grand Prix in Formula One ended. Formula E chief executive Jeff Dodds confirmed that the series was considering the venue, and Dutch driver Nyck de Vries, the 2020–21 Formula E champion, publicly supported the idea.

The race was confirmed on 23 June 2026 when Formula E and the FIA published the 2026–27 calendar, the first of the Gen4 era. Zandvoort was one of three new venues on the calendar, alongside Circuit of the Americas and Brands Hatch. The circuit signed a multi-year agreement, reported to be for three years with an option to extend. The event is promoted by Sportvibes and TIG Sports, the same companies that promoted the Dutch Grand Prix.

The first Zandvoort ePrix falls in the year after the final Dutch Grand Prix, held in August 2026. Circuit director Robert van Overdijk rejected suggestions that Formula E was a replacement for Formula One, saying the two events had different objectives. He also said the Gen4 car, with its larger battery capacity and faster charging, was a precondition for Formula E racing on a permanent circuit of Zandvoort's size.

== Circuit ==
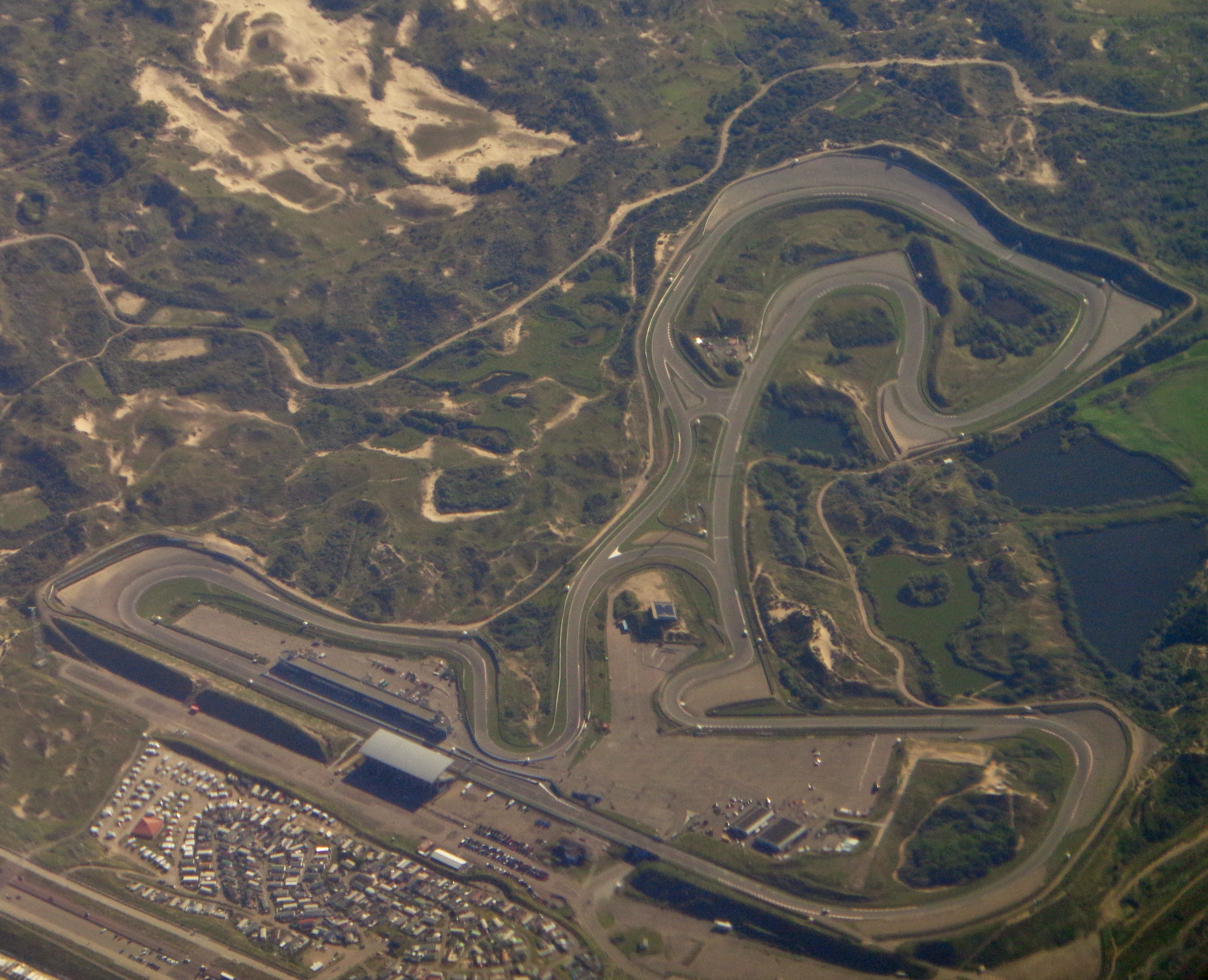
Aerial view of Circuit Zandvoort in 2016

The race will not use the full 4.259 km (2.646 mi) Grand Prix layout. As of June 2026, Formula E planned to use one of the circuit's shorter configurations, based on the national circuit, with a right-hand hairpin at the traditional Turn 5 and a total length of around 3 km (1.9 mi). No temporary chicanes were planned, although this was subject to change following simulations, and the layout still required FIA homologation. Van Overdijk said that any alterations would be temporary and that no permanent changes to the circuit were needed.

== Results ==
Edition	Race	Date	Winner	Second	Third	Pole position	Fastest lap	Ref
2027	1	18 June 2027	Scheduled					
2027	2	19 June 2027	Scheduled					
