= Oakwood Park Grammar School =

Location
- Oakwood Park; Maidstone, Kent, ME16 8AH; United Kingdom; 51°16′12″N 0°29′56″E

Information
- Type: Grammar School; Academy
- Motto: Strive and Serve
- Established: 1918
- Department for Education URN: 136727 Tables
- Ofsted: Reports
- Chairman of Governors: J. Murton
- Headteacher: Sarah Craig
- Staff: 65
- Gender: Boys (co-ed Sixth Form)
- Age: 11 to 18
- Enrolment: 994
- Houses: Broughton; Fisher; Hazlitt; Sadler; Wilberforce
- Colours: Maroon; Blue
- Publication: @Oakwood
- Website: http://www.opgs.org/

Oakwood Park Grammar School is a boys grammar school with academy status located in Maidstone, United Kingdom, the school is co-educational in the sixth form (years 12 and 13). The school takes boys at the age of 11 and over by examination (11-plus) and boys and girls at 16+ on their GCSE results. The current headteacher is Sarah Craig. The school is popularly known by its initials OPGS, Oakwood or Oakwood Park

== History ==
OPGS was founded in 1918 as the Co-educational Junior Technical School for Boys and the Junior Commercial School for Girls. The school was based at two sites in Maidstone town centre: Faith Street and Tonbridge Road. The school admitted pupils at the age of 11 and 13. The school was also known as the Maidstone Technical School.

By the 1950s the school had outgrown these two sites and a new site was found at Oakwood Park, further along on the Tonbridge Road. The school moved into its new premises between September 1958 and September 1959. The new premises were officially opened in September 1959 with a service of dedication performed by the then Archbishop of Canterbury Geoffrey Francis Fisher. It was then known as the Maidstone Technical School for Boys. In 1963 it became the Maidstone Technical High School for Boys.

The introduction of comprehensive education in the 1970s lead to the Thameside Scheme being introduced in the Maidstone area. September 1971 saw the last admission aged 11. There were no new admissions in the next two academic years. From September 1974 pupils were admitted at the age of 13. At the same time the school was renamed Maidstone School for Boys. Under the Thameside Scheme technical schools had in effect become grammar schools but were not allowed to call themselves as such. Now the school had to compete with Maidstone Grammar School for pupils.

In 1983 the use of the "grammar school" title was relaxed and on 10 October 1983 Maidstone School for Boys became Oakwood Park Grammar School (OPGS). In the 1980s the school started admitting girls into the sixth form.

Enrolment declined in the late 1980s and Kent County Council, the local education authority, considered merging OPGS with Invicta Grammar School, a girls grammar school located in east Maidstone. A vigorous campaign by parents, staff and governors prevented the merger. On 1 April 1992 OPGS became one of the first schools in the area to achieve grant maintained status, giving it independence from KCC. Enrolment increased thereafter and in September 1993 grammar schools across the area started admitting pupils at the age of 11 (year 7).

After the scrapping of grant maintained status in the late 1990s, OPGS became a community school, reverting to Kent County Council control. The school became a mathematics and computing specialist college in 2003. The school then became a foundation school, giving it some independence from Kent County Council. On 1 May 2011 the school officially became an academy, meaning that Kent County Council no longer have any responsibility for the school apart from co-ordinating admissions.

== Extracurricular activities ==
The school has sports teams in football, rugby, cricket, basketball, rowing and athletics which compete at local, county and national levels. There are regular inter-form competitions and an annual sports day. The school has music groups including an orchestra and the Coconut Grove steel band. The school has a purpose-built drama studio which is home to the drama club. Other school clubs include debating, chess and robotics. The school is a participant in the Duke of Edinburgh Award scheme and has numerous overseas trips. Oakwood focus on these aspects greatly and it is very unusual for a grammar school to emphasise the importance of extracurricular work. This is also done though volunteering day which is held each year and in which all students volunteer for one school day to gain experience and to give back to the community.

== Houses ==
OPGS used to have houses named after local villages – Allington, Brenchley, Chillington, Detling, Egerton and Farleigh. This house system was abandoned in the 1980s.

The house system was re-introduced in 2009 due to the school's growing size and to accompany the school's 50-year anniversary. The school's five houses are:

- Broughton (named after Andrew Broughton, former mayor of Maidstone and signatory of Charles I of England's death warrant)
- Fisher (named after Geoffrey Francis Fisher, Archbishop of Canterbury, who led the dedication service at the official opening of the school's Oakwood Park site)
- Hazlitt (named after William Hazlitt, a famous English essayist, playwright and social commentator who was from Maidstone)
- Sadler (named after David Sadler, a former OPGS student who went on to play 272 games for Manchester United football club following the devastating Munich air disaster, and 4 games for England)
- Wilberforce (named after William Wilberforce, the famous British politician who successfully stood against slavery, who has family in East Farleigh)

== Headteachers ==
- 2024–: S. Craig
- 2006–2024: Kevin W. Moody
- 1992–2006: Mike J. Newbould
- 1985–1992: A. G. Sandford
- 1966–1985: John A. Skinner
- 1956–1966: R. H. Voice
- 1933–1955: H. Collins
- 1918–1933: James Quick

== Alumni ==
OPGS has helped nurture students through various career paths.

- James Hall – artistic gymnast
- Jon Harley – footballer formerly of Chelsea and several other clubs
- David Sadler – footballer who played for Manchester United and England
- Dominic Sherwood – actor, known for his roles in Shadowhunters and Vampire Academy
- Laurie Vincent – musician, known for playing guitar, bass, and vocals in the band Slaves
- Marc Morris – historian
- Mark Sargeant – Michelin-starred chef
- Richard Sambrook - journalist and academic
- Jeff Dodds - chief executive officer of Formula E

== Controversies ==
Discovery of explicit video

On 22 June 1995, news broke that two teachers at OPGS had been suspended after students accidentally discovered a video of them engaging in sexual activity in the school gym. The tape, recorded eight years earlier, was unknowingly stored at the school and resurfaced when three 15-year-old pupils, working on a video project, viewed it. At least 12 students saw the footage before staff intervened. The teachers faced disciplinary action but were described as long-serving and well-respected members of staff.

Pornographic tweet

In 2018, local newspapers reported that headteacher Kevin Moody's Twitter account was hacked after a pornographic video was "liked" from it, leading to its circulation among sixth-form students. The school swiftly deactivated the account and warned pupils against sharing the video, citing a breach of the behaviour policy.

Teacher misconduct

Former geography teacher Keeley Dean was banned from teaching for life after it emerged she had a sexual relationship with a sixth-form student in 2008. The affair, lasting eight months, was reported in 2020 by the former pupil. A Teaching Regulation Agency panel found Dean guilty of professional misconduct, leading to her dismissal and lifetime prohibition from the profession.

== Notes and references ==
https://books.google.fi/books/about/Maidstone_Technical_High_School_for_Boys.html?id=7jndPAAACAAJ&redir_esc=y
