= 2025 London ePrix =

Race 15 of 16 of the 2024-25 Formula E season
← Previous race
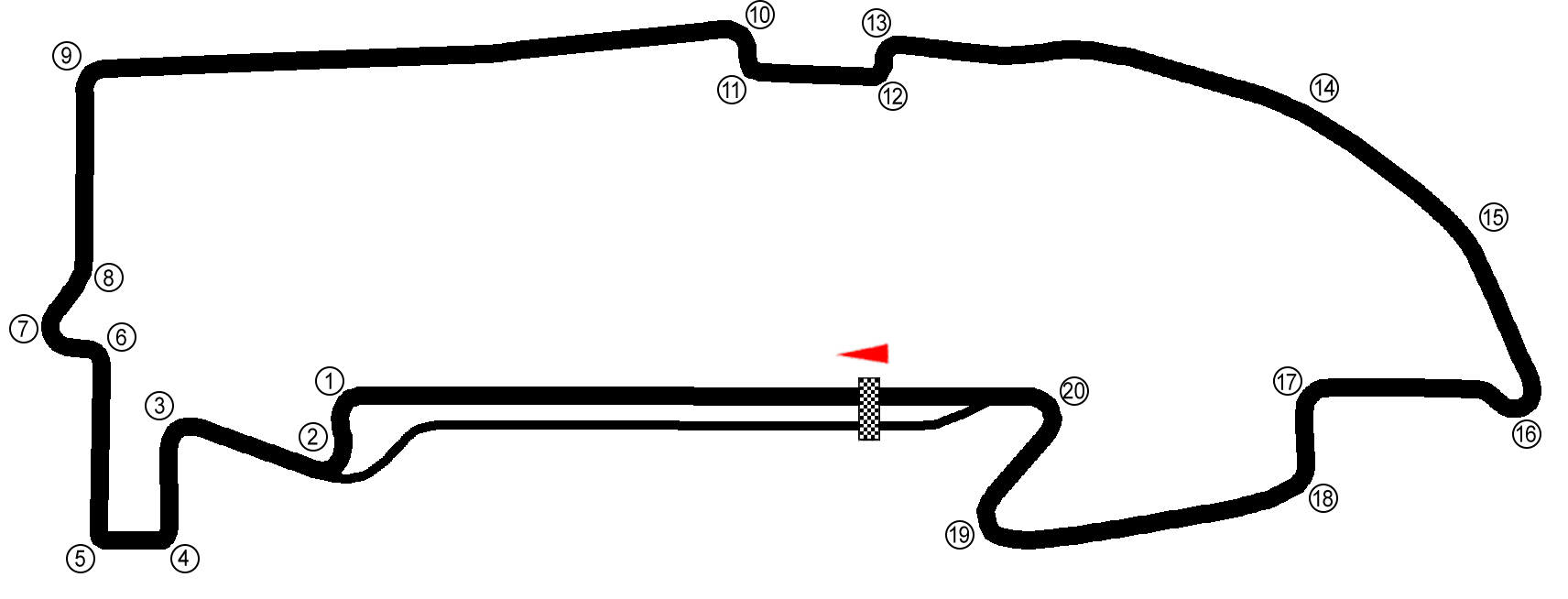

Race details
- Date: 26 July 2025
- Official name: 2025 Marvel Fantastic Four London E-Prix
- Location: ExCeL London Circuit, Royal Docks, Newham, London
- Course: Street circuit
- Course length: 2.086 km (1.296 mi)
- Distance: 38 (Note: 37 planned laps +1 added lap) laps, 79.218 km (49.224 mi)
- Scheduled distance: 37 laps, 77.182 km (47.959 mi)

Pole position
Driver	(New Zealand) Mitch Evans	Jaguar
- Time: 1:07.205

Fastest lap
Driver	(United Kingdom) Taylor Barnard	McLaren
- Time: 1:08.289

Podium
First	(New Zealand) Nick Cassidy	Jaguar
Second	(Netherlands) Nyck De Vries	Mahindra
Third	(Germany) Pascal Wehrlein	Porsche

2025 London ePrix
Race 16 of 16 of the 2024-25 Formula E season
← Previous race
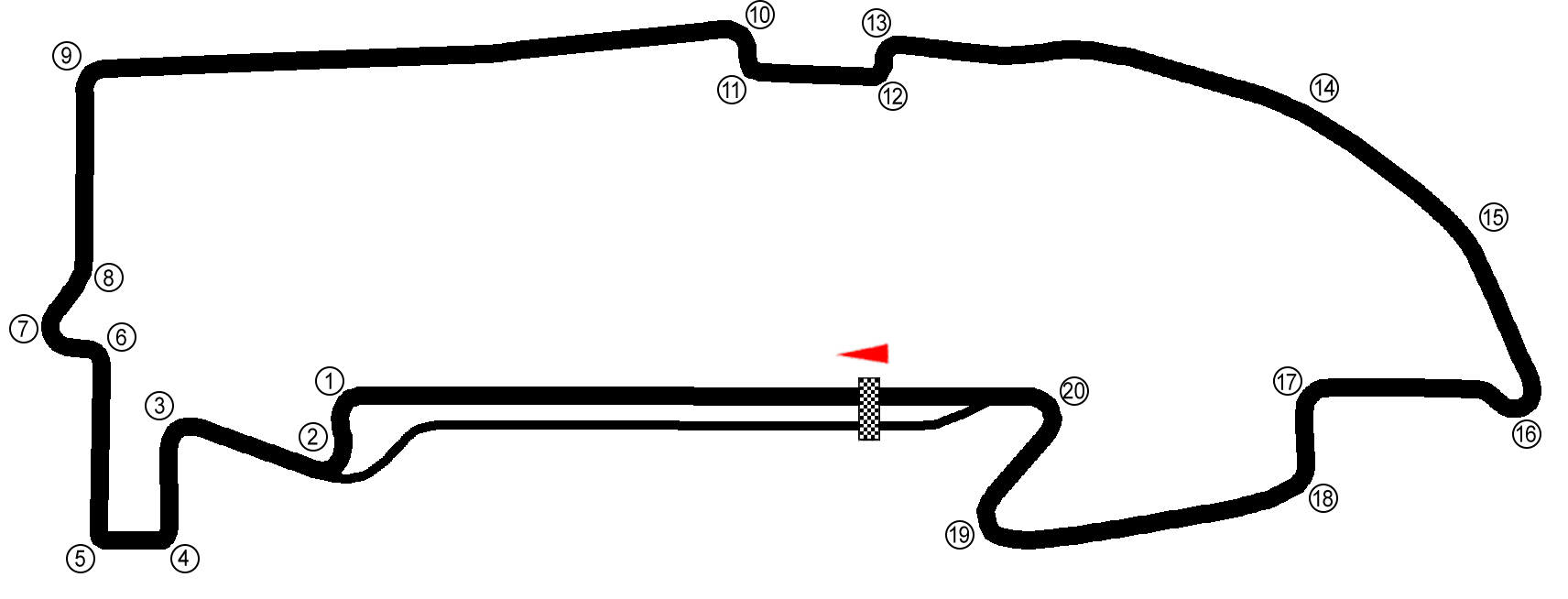

Race details
- Date: 27 July 2025
- Official name: 2025 Marvel Fantastic Four London E-Prix
- Location: ExCeL London Circuit, Royal Docks, Newham, London
- Course: Street circuit
- Course length: 2.086 km (1.296 mi)
- Distance: 36 (Note: 34 planned laps + 2 added laps) laps, 75.096 km (46.662 mi)
- Scheduled distance: 34 laps, 70.924 km (44.070 mi)

Pole position
Driver	(United Kingdom) Dan Ticktum	Cupra Kiro-Porsche
- Time: 1:07.278

Fastest lap
Driver	(New Zealand) Nick Cassidy	Jaguar
- Time: 1:07.950

Podium
First	(New Zealand) Nick Cassidy	Jaguar
Second	(Netherlands) Nyck De Vries	Mahindra
Third	(Switzerland) Sébastian Buemi	Envision-Jaguar

The 2025 London ePrix, known for sponsorship reasons as the 2025 Marvel Fantastic Four London E-Prix, was a pair of Formula E electric car races held at the ExCeL London Circuit in the Royal Docks area of Newham, London on 26 and 27 July 2025. They served as the 15th and 16th rounds of the 2024-25 Formula E season and the 7th running of the London ePrix.

Nick Cassidy won both races, with Nyck de Vries finishing second on both occasions. The final place on the podium was taken by Pascal Wehrlein in race one and Sébastien Buemi in race two.

== Background ==
Oliver Rowland had already secured the Formula E World Championship at the previous race weekend in Berlin, but the Teams' Championship and Manufacturers' Championship were both up for contention, with Porsche leading both championships going into London.

=== Driver changes ===
Norman Nato and Nyck de Vries both returned to Nissan and Mahindra respectively after missing the Berlin ePrix.

== Classification ==
(All times are in BST)

=== Race 1 ===
==== Qualifying ====
Qualifying for race 1 took place at 12:20 PM on 26 July.

Group draw
Group A	(United Kingdom) ROW	(United Kingdom) BAR	(New Zealand) CAS	(United Kingdom) TIC	(Germany) GUE	(Switzerland) BUE	(Netherlands) DEV	(Switzerland) MUE	(United Kingdom) BIR	(France) NAT	(Barbados) MAL
Group B	(Germany) WEH	(Portugal) DAC	(France) JEV	(Switzerland) MOR	(United Kingdom) DEN	(New Zealand) EVA	(Belgium) VAN	(United Kingdom) HUG	(Brazil) DIG	(Netherlands) FRI	(Germany) BEC

===== Qualifying duels =====
Quarter-finals
A2	(Germany) Maximilian Günther
A3	(Netherlands) Nyck de Vries
A1	(New Zealand) Nick Cassidy
A4	(United Kingdom) Dan Ticktum
B2	(New Zealand) Mitch Evans
B3	(United Kingdom) Jake Hughes
B1	(Germany) Pascal Wehrlein
B4	(Belgium) Stoffel Vandoorne

Semi-finals
(Netherlands) Nyck de Vries
(United Kingdom) Dan Ticktum
(New Zealand) Mitch Evans
(Germany) Pascal Wehrlein

Final
(Netherlands) Nyck de Vries
(New Zealand) Mitch Evans

===== Overall classification =====
Pos.	No.	Driver	Team	A	B	QF	SF	F	Grid
1	9	(New Zealand) Mitch Evans	Jaguar	—N/a	1:08.914	1:07.657	1:07.301	1:07.205	1
2	21	(Netherlands) Nyck de Vries	Mahindra	1:09.159	—N/a	1:07.574	1:07.643	1:07.379	2
3	1	(Germany) Pascal Wehrlein	Porsche	—N/a	1:08.690	1:07.603	1:07.335	—N/a	3
4	33	(United Kingdom) Dan Ticktum	Cupra Kiro-Porsche	1:09.207	—N/a	1:07.632	1:07.652	—N/a	4
5	37	(New Zealand) Nick Cassidy	Jaguar	1:08.785	—N/a	1:07.649	—N/a	—N/a	5
6	7	(Germany) Maximilian Günther	DS Penske	1:08.973	—N/a	1:07.751	—N/a	—N/a	6
7	2	(Belgium) Stoffel Vandoorne	Maserati	—N/a	1:08.950	1:07.775	—N/a	—N/a	7
8	55	(United Kingdom) Jake Hughes	Maserati	—N/a	1:08.936	1:07.843	—N/a	—N/a	8
9	48	(Switzerland) Edoardo Mortara	Mahindra	—N/a	1:08.968	—N/a	—N/a	—N/a	9
10	51	(Switzerland) Nico Müller	Andretti-Porsche	1:09.259	—N/a	—N/a	—N/a	—N/a	10
11	27	(United Kingdom) Jake Dennis	Andretti-Porsche	—N/a	1:08.973	—N/a	—N/a	—N/a	11
12	23	(United Kingdom) Oliver Rowland	Nissan	1:09.272	—N/a	—N/a	—N/a	—N/a	12
13	3	(Germany) David Beckmann	Cupra Kiro-Porsche	—N/a	1:09.107	—N/a	—N/a	—N/a	13
14	5	(United Kingdom) Taylor Barnard	McLaren-Nissan	1:09.300	—N/a	—N/a	—N/a	—N/a	14
15	25	(France) Jean-Éric Vergne	DS Penske	—N/a	1:09.122	—N/a	—N/a	—N/a	15
16	17	(France) Norman Nato	Nissan	1:09.371	—N/a	—N/a	—N/a	—N/a	16
17	13	(Portugal) António Félix da Costa	Porsche	—N/a	1:09.193	—N/a	—N/a	—N/a	17
18	16	(Switzerland) Sébastien Buemi	Envision-Jaguar	1:09.497	—N/a	—N/a	—N/a	—N/a	18
19	4	(Netherlands) Robin Frijns	Envision-Jaguar	—N/a	1:09.374	—N/a	—N/a	—N/a	19
20	8	(United Kingdom) Sam Bird	McLaren-Nissan	1:09.551	—N/a	—N/a	—N/a	—N/a	20
21	11	(Brazil) Lucas di Grassi	Lola Yamaha ABT	—N/a	1:09.766	—N/a	—N/a	—N/a	21
22	22	(Barbados) Zane Maloney	Lola Yamaha ABT	1:09.972	—N/a	—N/a	—N/a	—N/a	22

==== Race ====
Race 1 started at 5:05 PM on 26 July.

Pos.	No.	Driver	Team	Laps	Time/Retired	Grid	Points
1	37	(New Zealand) Nick Cassidy	Jaguar	38	51:15.991	5	25
2	21	(Netherlands) Nyck de Vries	Mahindra	38	+1.578	2	18
3	1	(Germany) Pascal Wehrlein	Porsche	38	+2.634	3	15+1^{2}
4	2	(Belgium) Stoffel Vandoorne	Maserati	38	+3.838	7	12
5	25	(France) Jean-Éric Vergne	DS Penske	38	+5.571	15	10
6	48	(Switzerland) Edoardo Mortara	Mahindra	38	+6.056	6	8
7	4	(Netherlands) Robin Frijns	Envision-Jaguar	38	+8.365	19	6
8	27	(United Kingdom) Jake Dennis	Andretti-Porsche	38	+9.387 (Note: Dennis finished 5th, but received a 5-second post-race penalty for causing a collision with Rowland.)	11	4
9	17	(France) Norman Nato	Nissan	38	+10.164	16	2
10	9	(New Zealand) Mitch Evans	Jaguar	38	+13.382	1	1+3^{1}
11	23	(United Kingdom) Oliver Rowland	Nissan	38	+14.680	12	
12	3	(Germany) David Beckmann	Cupra Kiro-Porsche	38	+15.070	13	
13	5	(United Kingdom) Taylor Barnard	McLaren-Nissan	38	+15.729	14	
14	13	(Portugal) António Félix da Costa	Porsche	38	+16,425	17	
15	51	(Switzerland) Nico Müller	Andretti-Porsche	38	+17.851	10	
16	16	(Switzerland) Sébastien Buemi	Envision-Jaguar	38	+17.943 (Note: Buemi received a 5-second penalty for causing a collision with Müller.)	18	
17	11	(Brazil) Lucas Di Grassi	Lola Yamaha ABT	38	+31.596 (Note: Di Grassi received a 5-second time penalty for crossing the pitlane exit line. He later received a 10-second time penalty for not using the total amount of time of his attack mode during the race.)	21	
Ret	8	(United Kingdom) Sam Bird	McLaren-Nissan	37	Puncture	20	
Ret	33	(United Kingdom) Dan Ticktum	Cupra Kiro-Porsche	31	Accident	4	
Ret	22	(Barbados) Zane Maloney	Lola Yamaha ABT	30	Technical issue	22	
Ret	55	(United Kingdom) Jake Hughes	Maserati	0	Collision damage	8	
Ret	7	(Germany) Maximilian Günther	DS Penske	0	Collision damage	6	

Notes:

- ^1 – Pole position.
- ^2 – Fastest lap.

==== Standings after the race ====
Drivers' Championship standings

	Pos	Driver	Points
	1	(United Kingdom) Oliver Rowland	184
	2	(Germany) Pascal Wehrlein	141
2	3	(New Zealand) Nick Cassidy	127
1	4	(United Kingdom) Taylor Barnard	112
1	5	(Portugal) António Félix da Costa	103

Teams' Championship standings

	Pos	Team	Points
	1	(Germany) Porsche	244
	2	(Japan) Nissan	205
1	3	(United Kingdom) Jaguar	191
1	4	(United States) DS Penske	178
1	5	(India) Mahindra	168

Manufacturers' Championship standings

Pos	Manufacturer	Points
1	(Germany) Porsche	361
2	(Japan) Nissan	338
3	(United Kingdom) Jaguar	310
4	(Netherlands) Stellantis	264
5	(India) Mahindra	195

- Notes: Only the top five positions are included for all three sets of standings.

=== Race 2 ===
==== Qualifying ====
Qualifying for race 1 took place at 12:20 PM on 27 July.

Group draw
Group A	(United Kingdom) ROW	(New Zealand) CAS	(Portugal) DAC	(Switzerland) MOR	(United Kingdom) DEN	(Netherlands) DEV	(New Zealand) EVA	(Switzerland) MUE	(United Kingdom) BIR	(Netherlands) FRI	(Barbados) MAL
Group B	(Germany) WEH	(United Kingdom) BAR	(France) JEV	(United Kingdom) TIC	(Germany) GUE	(Switzerland) BUE	(Belgium) VAN	(United Kingdom) HUG	(Brazil) DIG	(France) NAT	(Germany) BEC

===== Qualifying duels =====
Quarter-finals
A2	(Netherlands) Nyck de Vries
A3	(New Zealand) Mitch Evans
A1	(Switzerland) Edoardo Mortara
A4	(New Zealand) Nick Cassidy
B2	(Germany) Maximilian Günther
B3	(Germany) Pascal Wehrlein
B1	(United Kingdom) Dan Ticktum
B4	(Belgium) Stoffel Vandoorne

Semi-finals
(New Zealand) Mitch Evans
(New Zealand) Nick Cassidy
(Germany) Maximilian Günther
(United Kingdom) Dan Ticktum

Final
(New Zealand) Nick Cassidy
(United Kingdom) Dan Ticktum

===== Overall classification =====
Pos.	No.	Driver	Team	A	B	QF	SF	F	Grid
1	33	(United Kingdom) Dan Ticktum	Cupra Kiro-Porsche	—N/a	1:08.447	1:07.021	1:07.037	1:07.278	6 (Note: Dan Ticktum was given a five-place grid penalty for causing a collision in race one. As a result, he started the race from sixth position, but was still awarded the bonus points for pole position.)
2	37	(New Zealand) Nick Cassidy	Jaguar	1:08:752	—N/a	1:07.130	1:08.791	1:07.494	1
3	7	(Germany) Maximilian Günther	DS Penske	—N/a	1:08.573	1:07.316	1:07.331	—N/a	2
4	9	(New Zealand) Mitch Evans	Jaguar	1:08.750	—N/a	1:07:473	1:09.305	—N/a	3
5	1	(Germany) Pascal Wehrlein	Porsche	—N/a	1:08.587	1:07.456	—N/a	—N/a	4
6	21	(Netherlands) Nyck de Vries	Mahindra	1:08.621	—N/a	1:07.511	—N/a	—N/a	5
7	2	(Belgium) Stoffel Vandoorne	Maserati	—N/a	1:08.728	1:07.990	—N/a	—N/a	7
8	48	(Switzerland) Edoardo Mortara	Mahindra	1:08.583	—N/a	1:58.879	—N/a	—N/a	8
9	17	(France) Norman Nato	Nissan	—N/a	1:08.816	—N/a	—N/a	—N/a	9
10	23	(United Kingdom) Oliver Rowland	Nissan	1:08.786	—N/a	—N/a	—N/a	—N/a	10
11	5	(United Kingdom) Taylor Barnard	McLaren-Nissan	—N/a	1:08.823	—N/a	—N/a	—N/a	11
12	4	(Netherlands) Robin Frijns	Envision-Jaguar	1:08.813	—N/a	—N/a	—N/a	—N/a	12
13	25	(France) Jean-Éric Vergne	DS Penske	—N/a	1:08.844	—N/a	—N/a	—N/a	13
14	51	(Switzerland) Nico Müller	Andretti-Porsche	1:08.867	—N/a	—N/a	—N/a	—N/a	14
15	16	(Switzerland) Sébastien Buemi	Envision-Jaguar	—N/a	1:08.899	—N/a	—N/a	—N/a	19 (Note: Sébastien Buemi was given a five-place grid penalty for causing a collision in race one.)
16	27	(United Kingdom) Jake Dennis	Andretti-Porsche	1:09.014	—N/a	—N/a	—N/a	—N/a	15
17	55	(United Kingdom) Jake Hughes	Maserati	—N/a	1:08.925	—N/a	—N/a	—N/a	16
18	8	(United Kingdom) Sam Bird	McLaren-Nissan	1:09.094	—N/a	—N/a	—N/a	—N/a	17
19	11	(Brazil) Lucas di Grassi	Lola Yamaha ABT	—N/a	1:09.387	—N/a	—N/a	—N/a	21 (Note: Lucas di Grassi was given a three-place penalty for causing a collision during the third practice session.)
20	22	(Barbados) Zane Maloney	Lola Yamaha ABT	1:09.716	—N/a	—N/a	—N/a	—N/a	18
21	3	(Germany) David Beckmann	Cupra Kiro-Porsche	—N/a	1:09.404	—N/a	—N/a	—N/a	20
22	13	(Portugal) António Félix da Costa	Porsche	1:17.353	—N/a	—N/a	—N/a	—N/a	22

==== Race ====
Race 1 started at 5:05 PM on 27 July.

Pos.	No.	Driver	Team	Laps	Time/Retired	Grid	Points
1	37	(New Zealand) Nick Cassidy	Jaguar	36	47:25.718	1	25+1^{2}
2	21	(Netherlands) Nyck de Vries	Mahindra	36	+13.581	5	18
3	16	(Switzerland) Sébastien Buemi	Envision-Jaguar	36	+14.964	19	15
4	27	(United Kingdom) Jake Dennis	Andretti-Porsche	36	+15.610	15	12
5	9	(New Zealand) Mitch Evans	Jaguar	36	+18.129 (Note: Mitch Evans crossed the line in second place but was given a five-second time penalty for speeding under full course yellow. This dropped him to fifth place and promoted Sébastien Buemi to the podium.)	3	10
6	13	(Portugal) António Félix da Costa	Porsche	36	+18.428	22	8
7	7	(Germany) Maximilian Günther	DS Penske	36	+19.106	2	6
8	1	(Germany) Pascal Wehrlein	Porsche	36	+21.431	4	4
9	11	(Brazil) Lucas Di Grassi	Lola Yamaha Abt	36	+22.693	21	2
10	3	(Germany) David Beckmann	Cupra Kiro-Porsche	36	+23.388	20	1
11	17	(France) Norman Nato	Nissan	36	+24.292	9	
12	2	(Belgium) Stoffel Vandoorne	Maserati	36	+24.605	7	
13	4	(Netherlands) Robin Frijns	Envision-Jaguar	36	+25.464	12	
14	33	(United Kingdom) Dan Ticktum	Cupra Kiro-Porsche	36	+26.085	6	3^{1}
15	25	(France) Jean-Éric Vergne	DS Penske	36	+31.112	13	
16	22	(Barbados) Zane Maloney	Lola Yamaha Abt	36	+1:01.900	18	
17	55	(United Kingdom) Jake Hughes	Maserati	36	+1:09.846	16	
Ret	8	(United Kingdom) Sam Bird	McLaren-Nissan	22	Retired	17	
Ret	23	(United Kingdom) Oliver Rowland	Nissan	15	Retired	10	
Ret	51	(Switzerland) Nico Müller	Andretti-Porsche	15	Retired	14	
Ret	5	(United Kingdom) Taylor Barnard	McLaren-Nissan	9	Retired	11	
Ret	48	(Switzerland) Edoardo Mortara	Mahindra	0	Retired	8	

Notes:

- ^1 – Pole position.
- ^2 – Fastest lap.

==== Standings after the race ====
Porsche secured both Teams' and Manufacturers' Championship titles.

Drivers' Championship standings

	Pos	Driver	Points
	1	(United Kingdom) Oliver Rowland	184
1	2	(New Zealand) Nick Cassidy	153
1	3	(Germany) Pascal Wehrlein	145
	4	(United Kingdom) Taylor Barnard	112
	5	(Portugal) António Félix da Costa	111

Teams' Championship standings

	Pos	Team	Points
	1	(Germany) Porsche	256
1	2	(United Kingdom) Jaguar	227
1	3	(Japan) Nissan	207
1	4	(India) Mahindra	186
1	5	(United States) DS Penske	184

Manufacturers' Championship standings

	Pos	Manufacturer	Points
	1	(Germany) Porsche	383
1	2	(United Kingdom) Jaguar	350
1	3	(Japan) Nissan	342
	4	(Netherlands) Stellantis	274
	5	(India) Mahindra	213

Notes: Only the top five positions are included for all three sets of standings.

== Notes ==
Previous race: 2025 Berlin ePrix	FIA Formula E World Championship; 2024-25 season	Next race: 2025 São Paulo ePrix
Previous race: 2024 London ePrix	London ePrix	Next race: 2026 London ePrix
