= Formula E Gen4 =

Electric formula race car designed for use in the FIA Formula E Championship

- Category: Formula E
- Constructor: Spark Racing Technology
- Designers: Vincent Gaillardot (Technical Manager, Formula E)
- Predecessor: Formula E Gen3

Technical specifications
- Length: 5,540 mm (218.1 in)
- Width: 1,800 mm (70.9 in)
- Height: 1,025 mm (40.4 in)
- Wheelbase: 3,080 mm (121.3 in)
- Electric motor: Front, mid-rear
- Battery: 55 kWh Podium Advanced Technologies
- Power: 600 kW (805 hp; 816 PS) (qualifying and attack mode); 450 kW (603 hp; 612 PS) (race)
- Weight: 1,016 kg (2,240 lb)
- Tyres: Bridgestone treaded dry; Bridgestone Typhoon wet

Competition history

The Formula E Gen4 is the fourth generation of all-electric single-seater racing cars designed for use in the ABB FIA Formula E World Championship. The car was officially unveiled on 5 November 2025. The Gen4 is forecast to make its racing debut in Season 13 (2026-27).

Improvement to the previous Gen3 Evo car include permanent all-wheel drive, with a new rear wing which allows 2 aerodynamic configurations. Each car will be built from at least 20% recycled materials, with the whole car designed to be recyclable after its use. Prototype cars have been tested by manufacturers in late 2025.

== Overview ==
Teams and manufacturers expressed interest in the Gen4 era in early 2024, with the idea that many of the current championship teams will sign for all four years. Jaguar Racing is advancing in the field of Gen4 cars by setting up a specialised Mechatronics unit under the supervision of Muin Ahmad, who recently led the development of the twin battery system of Formula E Cars.

The Gen4 car was officially unveiled on 5 November 2025, with the championship describing it as a “trailblazer” for the series. The vehicle is designed to deliver a significant performance uplift compared to the preceding Gen3 specification. Among its headline figures are a peak power output of 805 horsepower (600 kW) in qualifying and attack mode, 603 horsepower (450 kW) during races with permanent all-wheel-drive, a 50 percent power increase over the Gen3 Evo model. The Gen4 car's increased power, downforce, and tire grip is expected to allow it to exceed the pace of the contemporary Formula 2 car.

Further technical highlights include active all-wheel drive for all phases of racing and two aerodynamic configurations (high-downforce for qualifying and low-downforce for races), which has extended the length of the cars significantly from 5,016 mm (197.5 in) to 5,540 mm (218.1 in). The new 55 kWh battery, supplied by Italian company Podium Advanced Technologies, can provide 51.25 kWh of usable energy and is capable of up to 700 kW of regenerative braking, which is expected to provide around 40% of energy outputted during a race distance. Due to the strengthened crash safety structures for the expected higher speeds, larger battery, and larger aerodynamic package compared to the Gen3 car, weight has increased to 1,012 kg (2,231 lb).

Like the Gen3 cars, teams can develop the rear powertrain and associated systems, while the front powertrain remains provided by a common supplier. Teams are now allowed to develop the rear suspension, active-locking limited-slip differentials on both axles, and the brake-by-wire system system which now features the readdition of friction brakes on the rear axle due to the higher expected speeds.

The tires are now supplied by Bridgestone and have grown in width by 30 mm (1.2 in) at the front and 15 mm (0.6 in) at the rear over the Gen3 Evo tires to 295 mm (11.6 in) and 330 mm (13.0 in) respectively. With the introduction of a dedicated wet weather tire compound known as the Typhoon tire, the standard tires use a more aggressive tread pattern and grippier compound. It marks Bridgestone's return to supplying single-seater racecars, which it last did for F1 in 2010. Power steering has been added for the first time in a Formula E car. Sustainability features of the chassis include 100 percent recyclable construction with at least 20 percent recycled content.

Manufacturers confirmed to begin testing the car in late November 2025 include OEMs such as Porsche, Jaguar, Nissan and others, with full competition planned for Season 13 of the championship.

== Reception ==
The Gen4 car has been described as a “quantum leap” in electric racing technology. Formula E CEO Jeff Dodds emphasized that it represents “over a decade of progress, innovation, and ambition in electric racing”. Motorsport media highlighted its potential to attract greater respect and viewership for the championship.

== See also ==
- Formula E Gen3
- Formula E
- Spark Racing Technology
