= Austin ePrix =

Annual Formula E race

- Circuit of the Americas (NASCAR Layout)
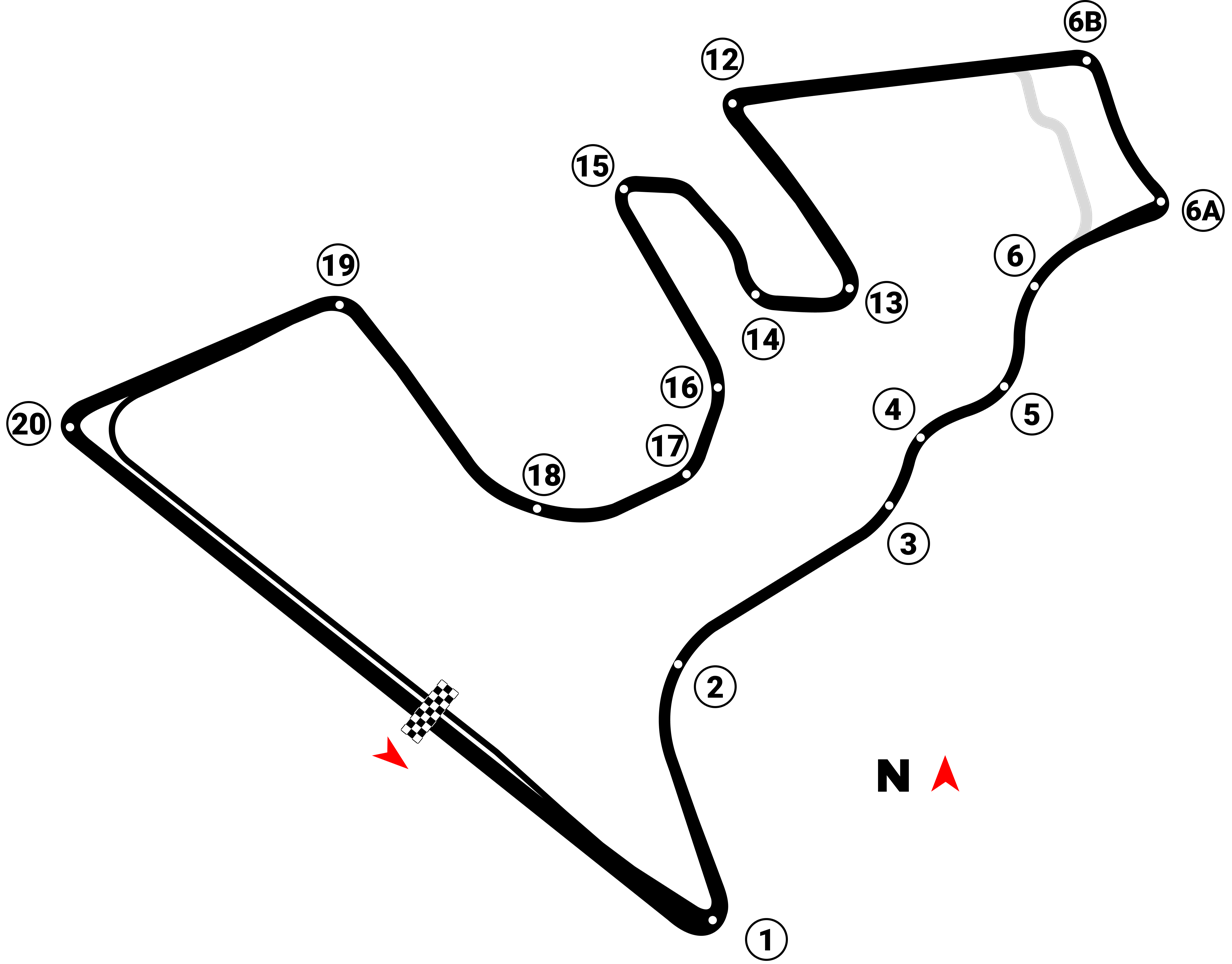

Race information
- First held: 2027
- Circuit length: 3.862 km (2.400 miles)

The Austin ePrix will be a future race of the FIA Formula E World Championship, an all-electric single-seater racing series. The race will be held on a modified version of the Circuit of the Americas (COTA) for the first time on February 6, 2027.

== History ==
On June 23, 2026, it was revealed that Austin would have a date for FE. It would mark the fifth United States ePrix following Miami, Long Beach, New York City, and Portland.

== Circuit ==
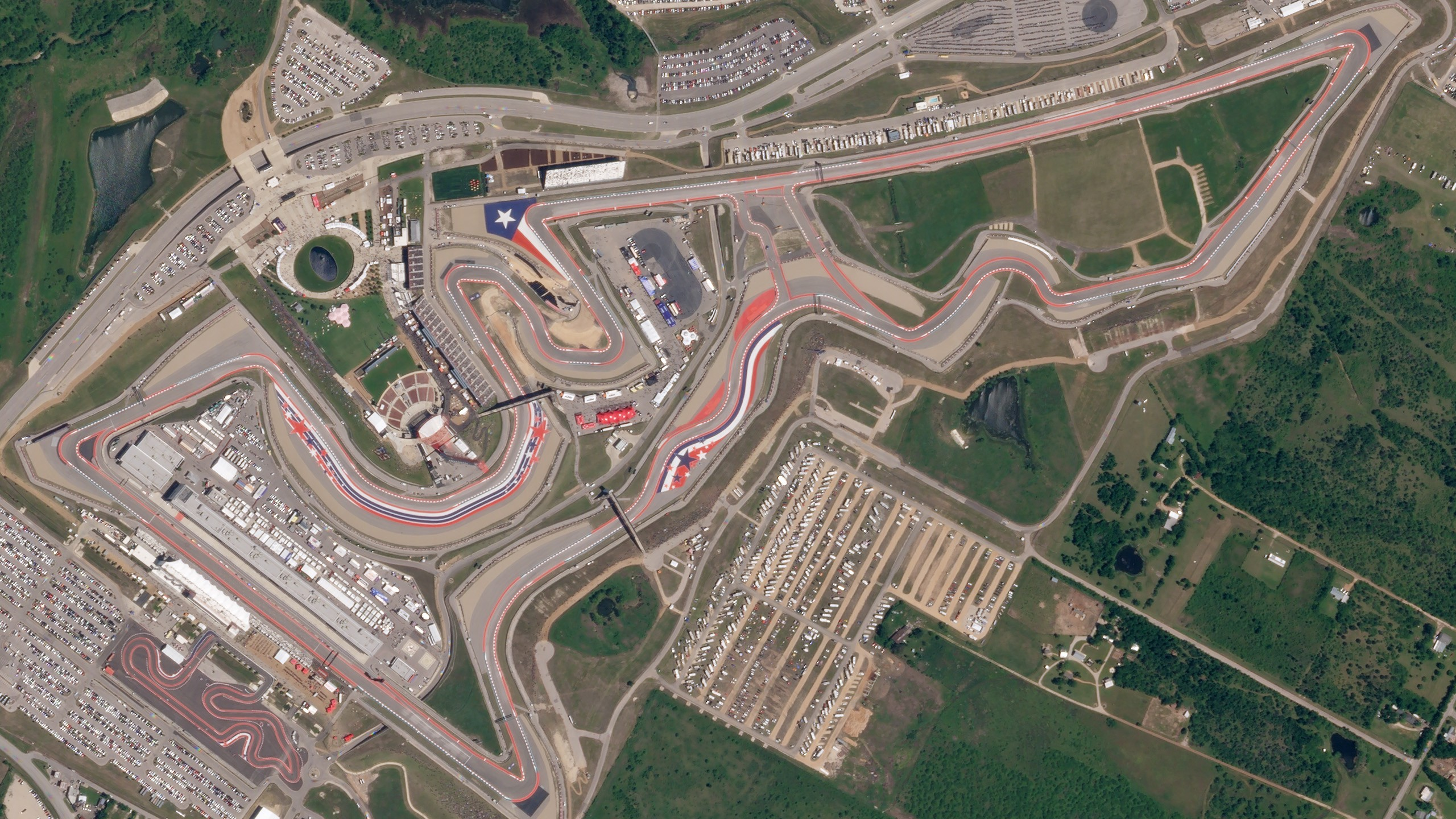
The Circuit of the Americas facilities in 2018

Circuit of the Americas will be home to the ePrix. With the ePrix debuting in 2027, this will mark the fifth major auto race held at COTA alongside F1's United States Grand Prix, MotoGP's United States motorcycle Grand Prix, WEC's Lone Star Le Mans, and the NASCAR's race weekend.

== Results ==
Edition	Track	Winner	Second	Third	Pole position	Fastest lap	Ref
2027	Circuit of the Americas						
