= Jeff Dodds =

British businessman and Chief Executive Officer of Formula E

- Born: Jeffrey Dodds; December 1973 (age 52)
- Occupation: Chief Executive Officer
- Years active: 1998-present
- Employer: Formula E
- Spouse: Mary
- Children: 2

Jeffrey Dodds (born December 1973) is a British business executive and the current Chief Executive Officer of Formula E. He took over the role in June 2023, having previously worked as the Chief Operating Officer for Virgin Media O2 from May 2017.

== Early life and education ==
Dodds was born in 1973 in Kent and went to school at the Oakwood Park Grammar School in Maidstone. Dodds' father was a firefighter and his mother was a nurse.

== Career ==
Prior to his work with Formula E, Dodds has held roles with organisations including Honda, Callaway Golf Europe, Virgin Media, and Tele2.

=== Formula E ===
In May 2023, Dodds was appointed Chief Executive Officer of Formula E.

Dodds stated that increasing media deals would be a key priority under his leadership.

In December 2024, Dodds announced Formula E would be donating $250,000 to charity after Max Verstappen won the Formula One title. The money was split between the Red Bull Wings for Life organisation for spinal cord research and another charity dedicated to raising opportunities for women in motorsport.

=== Other work ===
Dodds has been a board member of disability advocacy organisation, The Valuable 500, since its inception. He is currently the Chair, having taken up the position in 2023.

== Personal life ==
Dodds lives in Berkshire with his wife Mary and the couple has two children. Away from work, Dodds' interests include golf, driving, shooting and cooking.

Dodds has said he has been a Formula One fan all his life.
