= Formula E Gen3 =

Electric formula race car designed for use in the FIA Formula E Championship

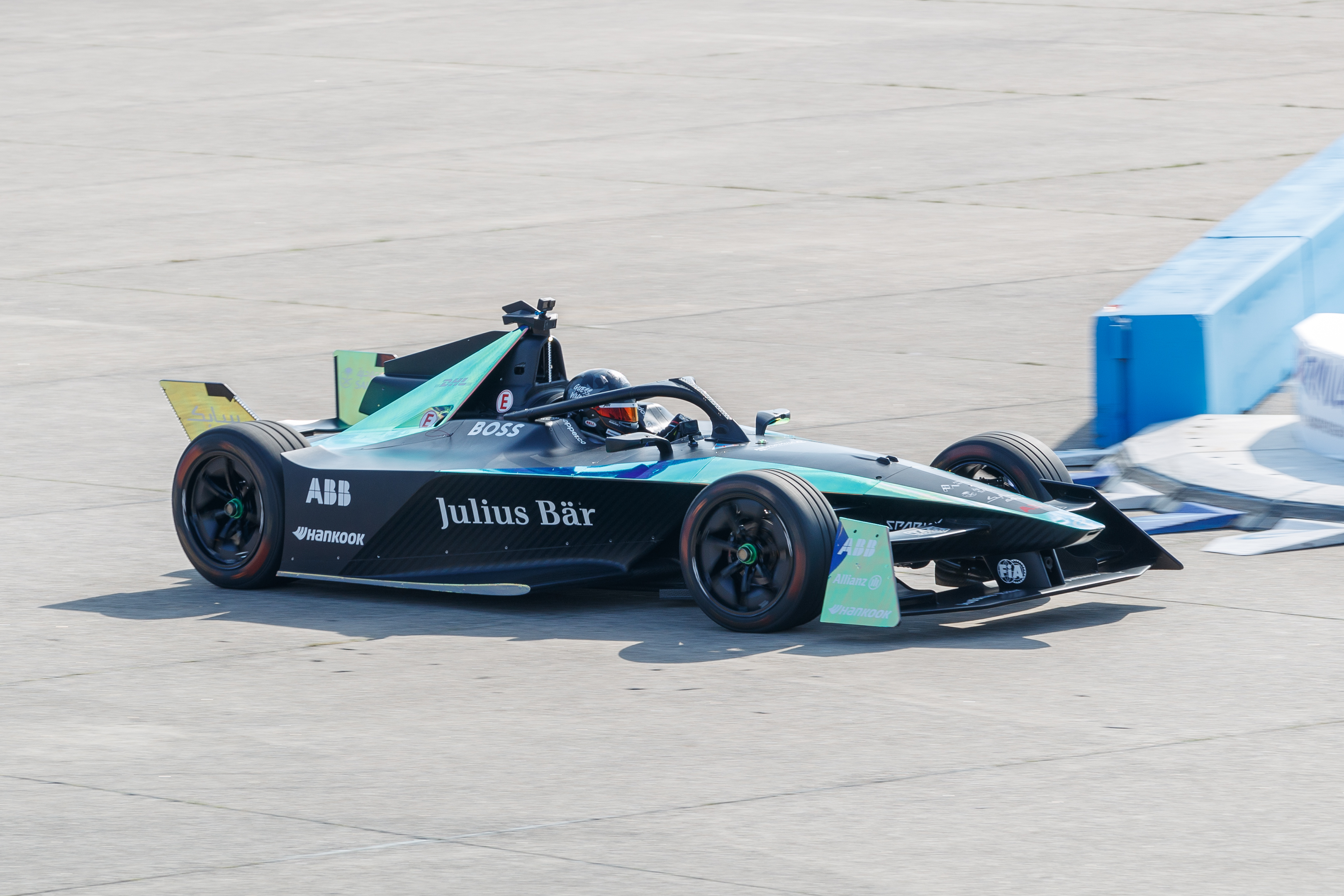
- Daniel Abt driving the Gen3 at a 2023 Berlin ePrix demo
- Category: Formula E
- Constructor: Spark Racing Technology
- Designer: Alessandra Ciliberti (Technical Director)
- Predecessor: Spark SRT05e
- Successor: Formula E Gen4

Technical specifications
- Chassis: Carbon fibre and aluminium monocoque
- Length: 5,016.2 mm (197.5 in)
- Width: 1,700 mm (66.9 in)
- Height: 1,023.4 mm (40.3 in)
- Wheelbase: 2,970.5 mm (116.9 in)
- Electric motor: Various mid-mounted
- Transmission: Various unknown
- Battery: 47 kW·h (169 MJ) 12.77 C by WAE Technologies
- Power: GENBETA: 400 kW (536 hp; 544 PS); Max: 350 kW (469 hp; 476 PS); Race: 300 kW (402 hp; 408 PS)
- Weight: 760 kg (1,675.5 lb); 840 kg (1,851.9 lb) (with driver)
- Tyres: Hankook

Competition history
- Notable entrants: (United States) DS Penske (China) Nio 333 Racing (China) ERT Formula E Team (United States) Cupra Kiro (Germany) ABT CUPRA Formula E Team (United Kingdom) Lola Yamaha Abt Formula E Team (United Kingdom) NEOM McLaren Formula E Team (Monaco) Maserati MSG Racing (India) Mahindra Racing (United Kingdom) Jaguar TCS Racing (Germany) Porsche Formula E Team (United Kingdom) Envision Racing (Japan) Nissan Formula E Team (United States) Andretti Formula E (France) Citroën Racing

The Formula E Gen3, also known as Spark Gen3 or simply Gen3, is an electric formula race car designed for use in the FIA Formula E Championship. The car is the successor to the SRT05e, and is constructed by Spark Racing Technology. It is used as the base car for all manufacturers and teams from the 2022–23 Formula E World Championship onwards. The upgraded Gen3 Evo has been used from 2024–25 season onwards. It is the first ever Formula E car with all-wheel drive to race internationally.

== Development ==
In July 2020 it was announced that Spark Racing Technology would build the chassis and supply the front axles, Williams Advanced Engineering would supply the batteries, and Hankook would supply all-weather tires that incorporate bio-material and sustainable rubber.

== Specifications ==
The wheelbase is 2,970 mm (117 in) and the weight is 760 kg (1,676 lb) without the 80 kg (176 lb) driver allocation for a total of 840 kg (1,851.9 lb). It has a manufacturer-developed rear axle electric motor which is limited to a maximum of 350 kW (469 hp; 476 PS) in qualifying and attack mode, and 300 kW (402 hp; 408 PS) in race mode. The front axle is equipped with a standardized Front Powertrain Kit (FPK), which is a 350 kW (469 hp; 476 PS) drive unit supplied by Lucid Motors solely used for regenerative braking. The package, which also includes the single-speed gear reduction, differential, and inverter, weighs 32 kg (71 lb) and fits within the dimensions of 259 mm × 343 mm × 266 mm (10.2 in × 13.5 in × 10.5 in). The motor has a maximum speed of 19,500 RPM and has a power density of 15.6 hp/kg. The FPK is limited to 250 kW of regeneration, which along with 350 kW from the rear axle allows for 600 kW of regenerative braking in total. The battery is a 47 kWh liquid cooled unit weighing 284 kg (626 lb) and limited to 38.5 kWh usable capacity in races. The battery is also designed to handle "flash-charging" at rates of up to 600 kW, allowing pitstop recharging into the championship for the first time; however, the introduction of fast charging was postponed due to battery issues persistent throughout testing. The theoretical top speed is 322 km/h (200 mph). The power-to-weight ratio is roughly equivalent to an Audi RS5 Turbo DTM.

=== Gen 3 Evo ===
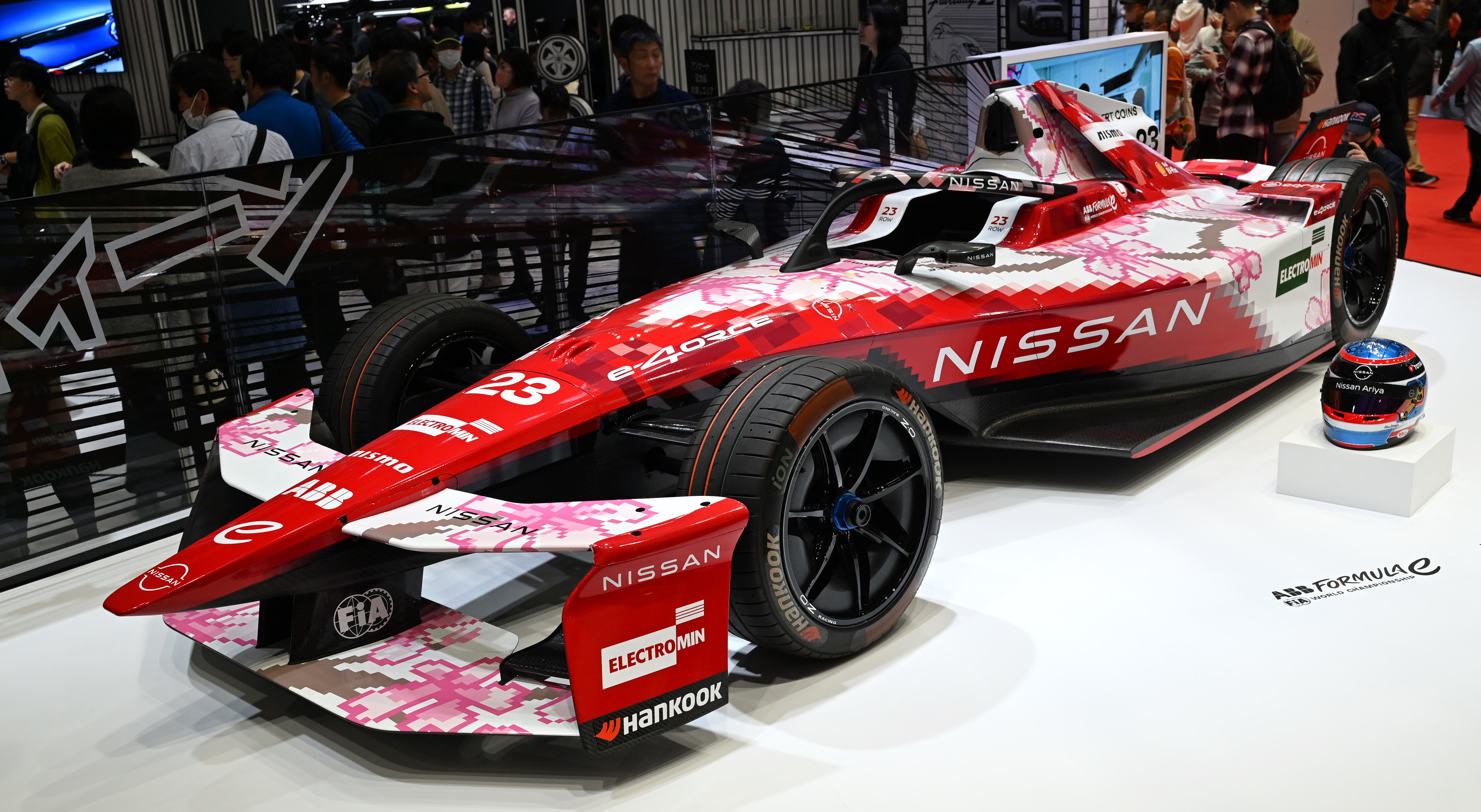
2024–25 Gen3 Evo used by the Nissan Formula E Team

The Gen3 Evo car was introduced for the 2024–2025 season. The front wing was changed to reintroduce an upper element and a more covered front wheel seen on previous generations for their lower drag, better durability and altered aesthetics. The Hankook tires were modified to provide 5-10% more grip after driver feedback. While peak power remains at 350kW, the extra 50kW over the standard race mode is now provided by the FPK, enabling all-wheel drive for use during qualifying, race starts, and Attack Mode. The changes are expected to decrease laptimes by 1–1.5 seconds and improve the utility of Attack Mode's additional power, which was previously limited by insufficient traction. The addition of customizable headlights and noise generators were considered to help differentiate manufacturers, but were ultimately not implemented.

== GENBETA ==
The GENBETA is a modified version of the Gen3 racecar. It has enhanced battery output, all-wheel drive, softer iON Race tyre compound, and 3D printed front wing endplates, wheel fins and a wind deflector. It has been used to break two different world records.

=== World indoor speed record ===
During the 2023 London ePrix weekend, then-McLaren driver Jake Hughes set a new Guinness World Record for indoor speed by hitting 218.71 km/h (135.9 mph) inside London's ExCeL Centre. The previous record for fastest speed achieved by a vehicle indoors was 165.20 km/h (102.65 mph) set by American driver Leh Keen in a Porsche Taycan Turbo S at the New Orleans Convention Centre in 2021.

=== Single-seater acceleration record ===
In January 2024, Reem Al Aboud set a new record for FIA single-seater acceleration. She drove the GENBETA from 0-100km/h (0-60mph) in 2.49 seconds, beating the previous benchmark of 2.6 seconds, which was set in a Formula One car.
