= 2023–24 Formula E World Championship =

Electric car racing season

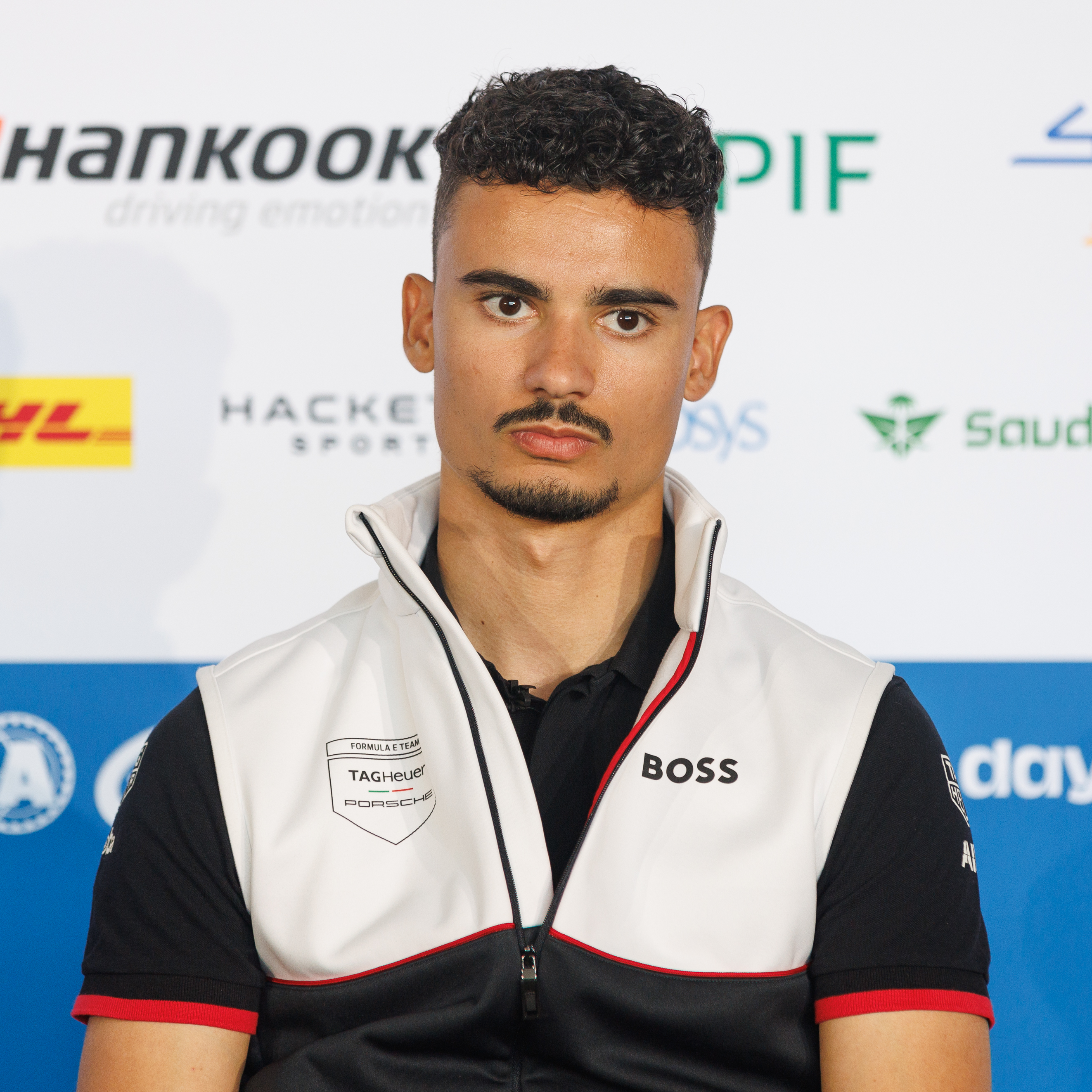
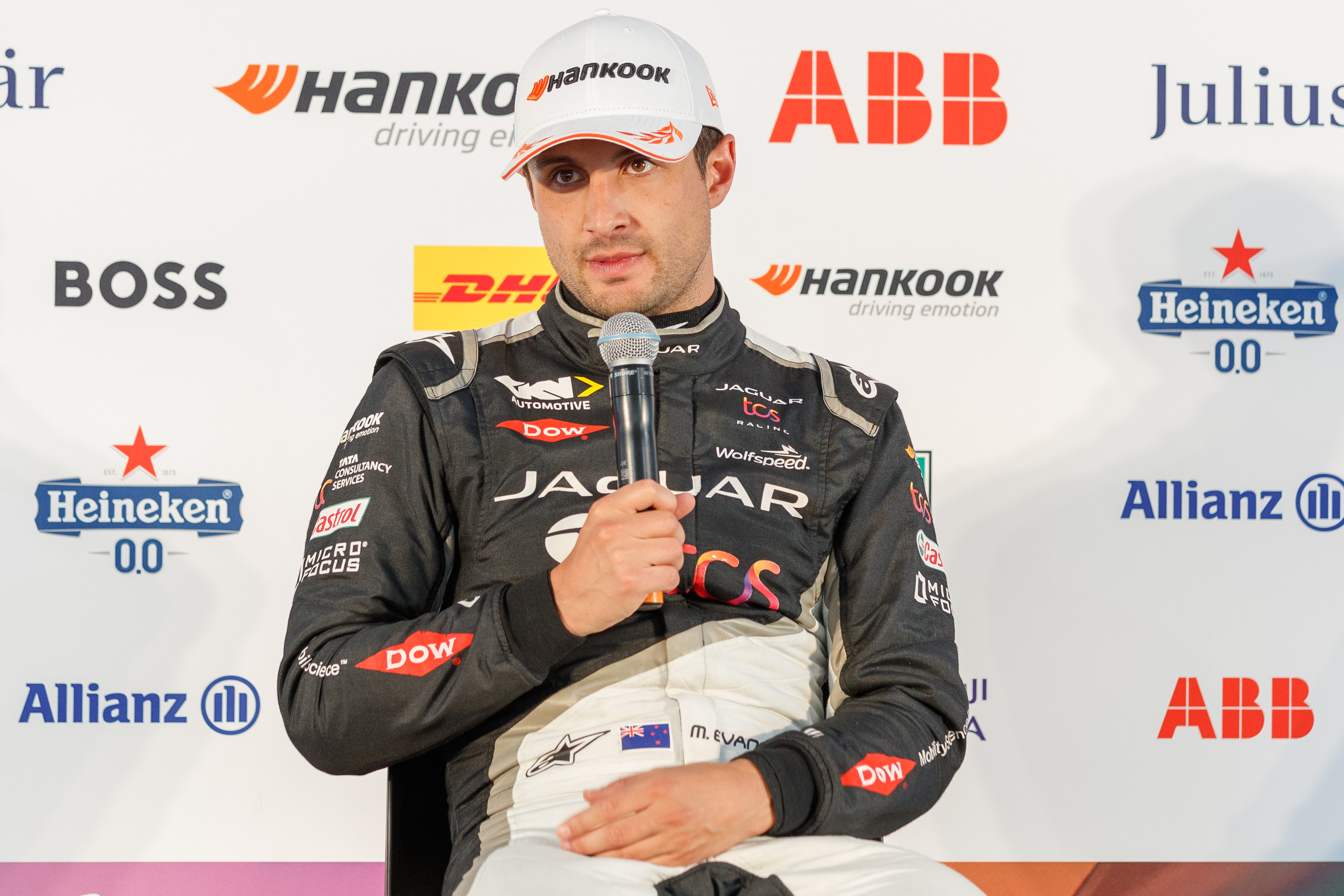
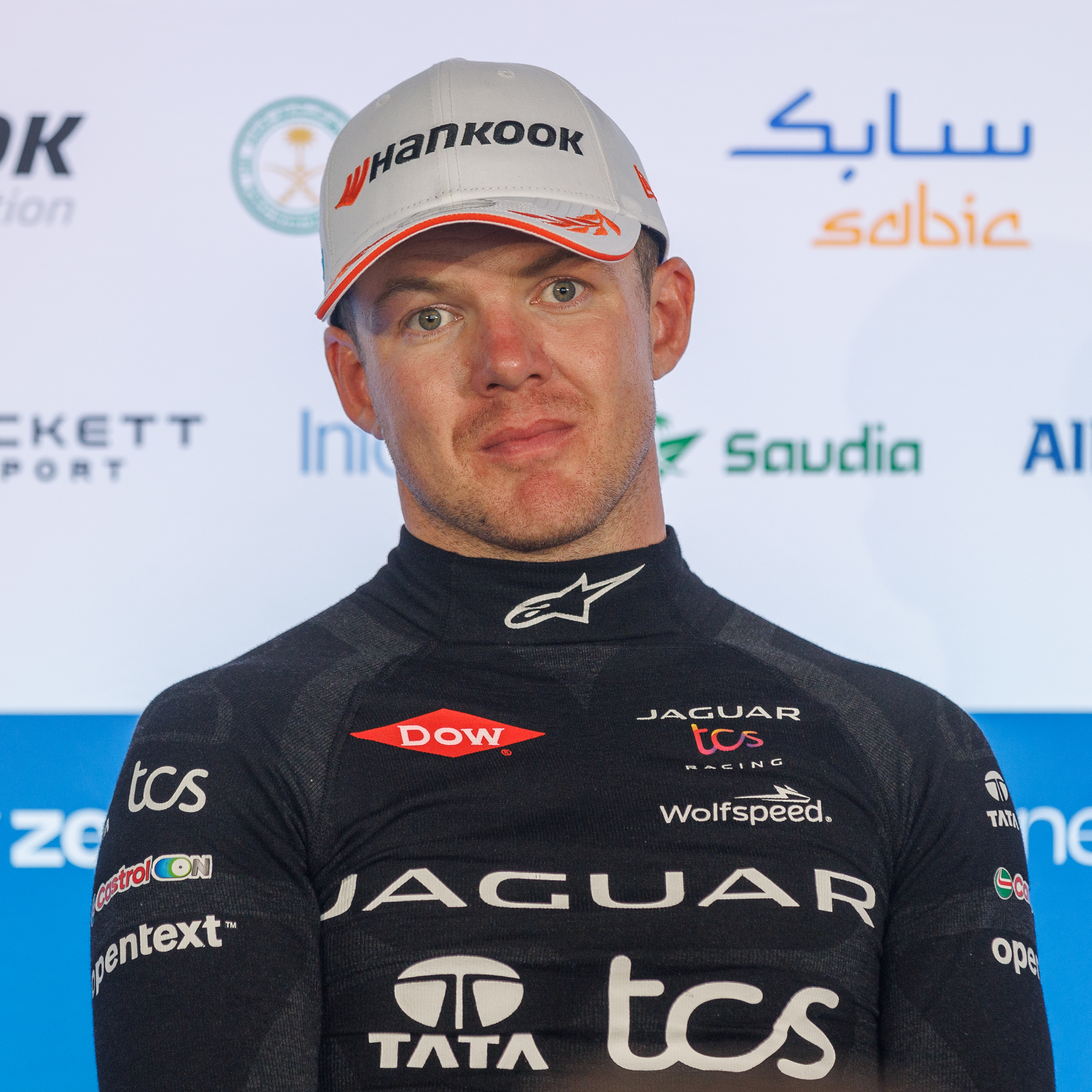
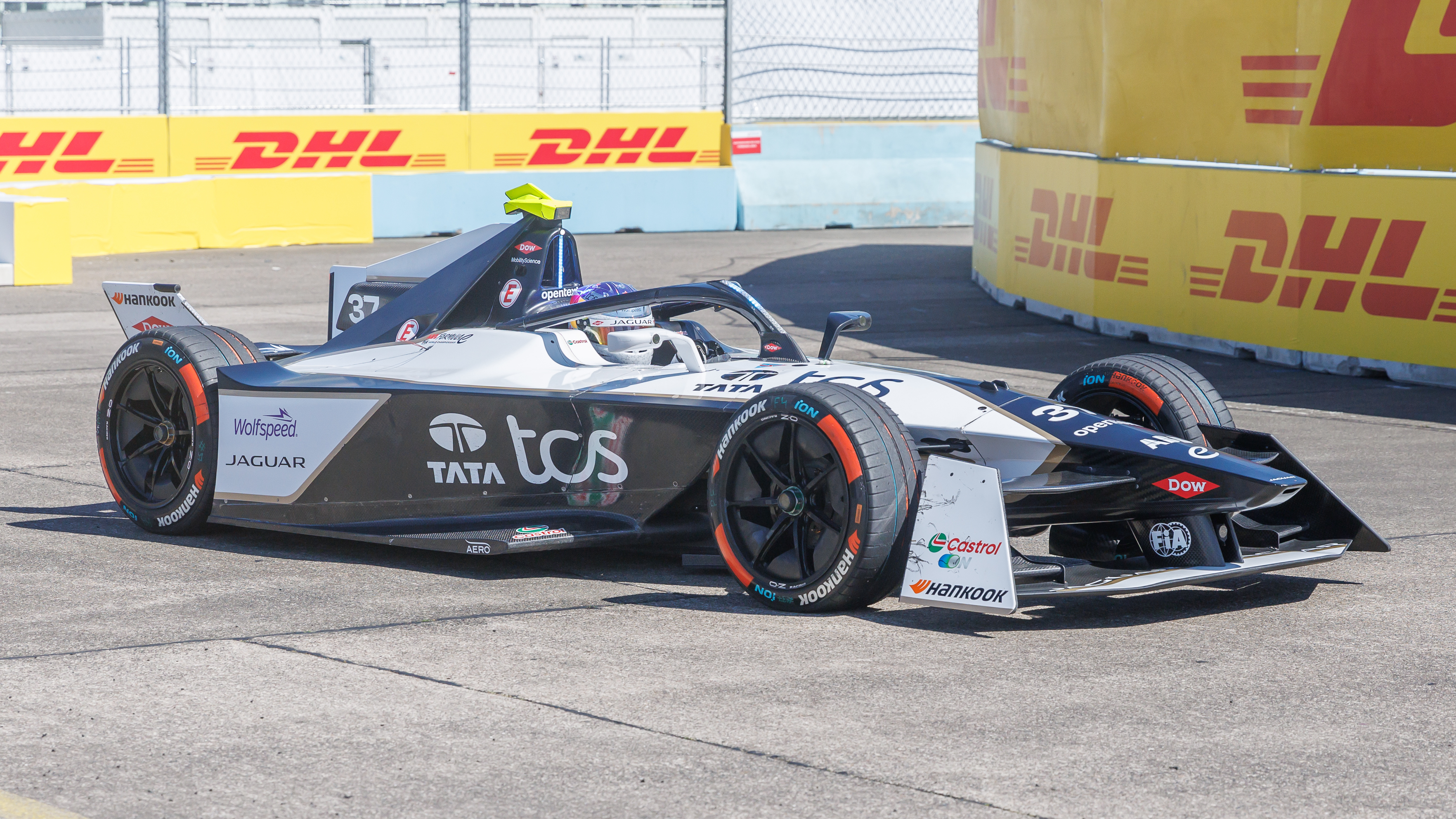
Pascal Wehrlein (top) won his first World Drivers' Championship with Porsche. Mitch Evans (middle left) ended the season as runner-up, while Nick Cassidy (middle right) finished third. Jaguar TCS Racing and Jaguar (bottom) won their first World Teams' Championship and the inaugural Manufacturers' Trophy.

The 2023–24 ABB FIA Formula E World Championship was the tenth season of the FIA Formula E championship, a motor racing championship for electrically powered vehicles recognized by motorsport's governing body, the Fédération Internationale de l'Automobile (FIA), as the highest class of competition for electric open-wheel racing cars. Although the championship season is designated as 2023–2024, all races were held in 2024.

Pascal Wehrlein, driving for the TAG Heuer Porsche Formula E Team, won his first World Drivers' Championship at the final race of the season, ahead of the Jaguar pair of Mitch Evans and Nick Cassidy. Jaguar TCS Racing took their first World Teams' Championship and also won the inaugural Manufacturer's Cup.

== Teams and drivers ==
All teams used the Formula E Gen3 car on Hankook tyres.

Team	Powertrain	No.	Drivers	Rounds
(United States) Andretti Formula E	Porsche 99X Electric (Note: The 99X Electric branding has been used for every Formula E powertrain developed by Porsche ever since their debut season. This is the third powertrain.)	1	(United Kingdom) Jake Dennis	All
(United States) Andretti Formula E	Porsche 99X Electric	17	(France) Norman Nato	All
(United States) DS Penske	DS E-Tense FE23 (Note: Contributes points towards Stellantis' total in the Manufacturers' Trophy, alongside the Maserati Tipo Folgore.)	2	(Belgium) Stoffel Vandoorne	All
(United States) DS Penske	DS E-Tense FE23	25	(France) Jean-Éric Vergne	All
(China) ERT Formula E Team	ERT X24	3	(Brazil) Sérgio Sette Câmara	All
(China) ERT Formula E Team	ERT X24	33	(United Kingdom) Dan Ticktum	All
(United Kingdom) Envision Racing	Jaguar I-Type 6	4	(Netherlands) Robin Frijns	1–8, 11–16
(United Kingdom) Envision Racing	Jaguar I-Type 6	4	(Sweden) Joel Eriksson	9–10
(United Kingdom) Envision Racing	Jaguar I-Type 6	16	(Switzerland) Sébastien Buemi	1–8, 11–16
(United Kingdom) Envision Racing	Jaguar I-Type 6	16	(Estonia) Paul Aron	9–10
(United Kingdom) NEOM McLaren Formula E Team	Nissan e-4ORCE 04	5	(United Kingdom) Jake Hughes	All
(United Kingdom) NEOM McLaren Formula E Team	Nissan e-4ORCE 04	8	(United Kingdom) Sam Bird	1–8, 11–16 (Note: Bird was initially entered for the 2024 Monaco ePrix, but withdrew due to a hand injury sustained in free practice.)
(United Kingdom) NEOM McLaren Formula E Team	Nissan e-4ORCE 04	8	(United Kingdom) Taylor Barnard	8–10
(Monaco) Maserati MSG Racing	Maserati Tipo Folgore (Note: The Maserati powertrain is a rebadged DS E-Tense FE23, contributing points towards Stellantis' total in the Manufacturers' Trophy.)	7	(Germany) Maximilian Günther	All
(Monaco) Maserati MSG Racing	Maserati Tipo Folgore	18	(India) Jehan Daruvala	All
(United Kingdom) Jaguar TCS Racing	Jaguar I-Type 6	9	(New Zealand) Mitch Evans	All
(United Kingdom) Jaguar TCS Racing	Jaguar I-Type 6	37	(New Zealand) Nick Cassidy	All
(Germany) ABT CUPRA Formula E Team	Mahindra M10Electro	11	(Brazil) Lucas di Grassi	All
(Germany) ABT CUPRA Formula E Team	Mahindra M10Electro	51	(Switzerland) Nico Müller	1–8, 11–16
(Germany) ABT CUPRA Formula E Team	Mahindra M10Electro	51	(South Africa) Kelvin van der Linde	9–10
(Germany) TAG Heuer Porsche Formula E Team	Porsche 99X Electric	13	(Portugal) António Félix da Costa	All
(Germany) TAG Heuer Porsche Formula E Team	Porsche 99X Electric	94	(Germany) Pascal Wehrlein	All
(India) Mahindra Racing	Mahindra M10Electro	21	(Netherlands) Nyck de Vries	1–8, 11–16
(India) Mahindra Racing	Mahindra M10Electro	21	(United Kingdom) Jordan King	9–10
(India) Mahindra Racing	Mahindra M10Electro	48	(Switzerland) Edoardo Mortara	All
(Japan) Nissan Formula E Team	Nissan e-4ORCE 04	22	(United Kingdom) Oliver Rowland	All (Note: Rowland was initially entered for the 2024 Portland ePrix, but withdrew due to falling ill ahead of the event.)
(Japan) Nissan Formula E Team	Nissan e-4ORCE 04	22	(Brazil) Caio Collet	13–14
(Japan) Nissan Formula E Team	Nissan e-4ORCE 04	23	(France) Sacha Fenestraz	All

=== Team changes ===
- Nio left Formula E after the prior season's end and fully rebranded to ERT Formula E Team for 2024 after new investment.

=== Driver changes ===
- Robin Frijns' contract with ABT CUPRA for 2024 would be terminated, with the team opting to reunite with Lucas di Grassi, who won the 2016–17 championship with the team.
- Sam Bird left Jaguar Racing after three seasons with the team. Nick Cassidy switched to the team from Envision Racing to partner Mitch Evans.
- After Frijns' contract with ABT Cupra was terminated, he returned to Envision Racing in the place of Jaguar-bound Cassidy.
- McLaren announced that René Rast had departed the team after spending a season with them. Bird was announced as his replacement after he departed Jaguar.
- Oliver Rowland rejoined Nissan, with whom he had driven four seasons prior to a two-year spell at Mahindra Racing. This saw Norman Nato leave the team after one year with the manufacturer.
- André Lotterer left Andretti Autosport and Formula E after six seasons. Former Nissan driver Nato stepped in as his replacement.
- After six years together, Edoardo Mortara left Maserati MSG Racing and was replaced by previous Mahindra reserve driver Jehan Daruvala. Mortara joined Mahindra in place of the CUPRA-bound di Grassi.
- After a year away, 2020–21 series champion Nyck de Vries returned to the sport with Mahindra to replace Roberto Merhi.

==== Mid-season ====
McLaren driver Sam Bird sustained a hand injury in a crash during the opening practice session of the Monaco ePrix. He withdrew from the event and was replaced by McLaren reserve and development driver Taylor Barnard, who already drove for the team in the rookie practice session ahead of the Misano ePrix and became the youngest driver to start a race in Formula E. Bird's injury meant that he was also forced to miss the Berlin E-Prix double-header, with Barnard continuing to deputize. Bird returned from the Shanghai E-Prix onwards.

Multiple drivers missed the Berlin ePrix double-header because of a calendar clash with the FIA World Endurance Championship's 6 Hours of Spa-Francorchamps. Both Envision Racing drivers prioritized their WEC commitments and were replaced by GT driver Joel Eriksson, whose last Formula E race was for Dragon / Penske in the 2020–21 season, and Hitech Pulse-Eight Formula 2 driver Paul Aron. Mahindra Racing's Nyck de Vries also missed out on Berlin and had Mahindra reserve and development driver Jordan King take his place. ABT CUPRA once again had their reserve driver Kelvin van der Linde replace Nico Müller for the Berlin round.

Nissan driver Oliver Rowland fell ill ahead of the Portland ePrix. He was replaced by the team's reserve driver, Indy NXT competitor Caio Collet, who made his series debut.

== Calendar ==
The following ePrix formed a part of the 2023–24 Formula E World Championship:

Round	E-Prix	Country	Circuit	Date
1	Mexico City ePrix	Mexico	Autódromo Hermanos Rodríguez	13 January 2024
2	Diriyah ePrix	Saudi Arabia	Riyadh Street Circuit	26 January 2024
3	Diriyah ePrix	Saudi Arabia	Riyadh Street Circuit	27 January 2024
4	São Paulo ePrix	Brazil	São Paulo Street Circuit	16 March 2024
5	Tokyo ePrix	Japan	Tokyo Street Circuit	30 March 2024
6	Misano ePrix	Italy	Misano World Circuit Marco Simoncelli	13 April 2024
7	Misano ePrix	Italy	Misano World Circuit Marco Simoncelli	14 April 2024
8	Monaco ePrix	Monaco	Circuit de Monaco	27 April 2024
9	Berlin ePrix	Germany	Tempelhof Airport Street Circuit	11 May 2024
10	Berlin ePrix	Germany	Tempelhof Airport Street Circuit	12 May 2024
11	Shanghai ePrix	China	Shanghai International Circuit	25 May 2024
12	Shanghai ePrix	China	Shanghai International Circuit	26 May 2024
13	Portland ePrix	United States	Portland International Raceway	29 June 2024
14	Portland ePrix	United States	Portland International Raceway	30 June 2024
15	London ePrix	United Kingdom	ExCeL London	20 July 2024
16	London ePrix	United Kingdom	ExCeL London	21 July 2024

=== Location changes ===
- The Cape Town E-Prix, the Jakarta E-Prix and the Rome E-Prix were not held in 2024. There originally was a plan to reschedule the Jakarta round in the wake of a general election period, but it was ultimately rejected.
- The Tokyo E-Prix joined the calendar and became the first time an FIA World Championship visited the city.
- The Shanghai E-Prix joined the calendar and became the first time the championship raced in China since the Sanya E-Prix in the 2018–19 season.
- The Misano E-Prix joined the calendar, replacing the Rome E-Prix.
- The Portland E-Prix hosted a double header after having hosted only one race in 2023.
- The Hyderabad E-Prix was originally set to be held on 10 February 2024, but was cancelled due to a change in governance for the region.

=== ePrix locations ===
Location of ePrix in season 10
(ePrix - Single Race)
(ePrix - Double Header)

== Regulation changes ==
The Manufacturers' Cup was introduced ahead of the São Paulo ePrix, with the championship standings backdated to the start of the season. The highest-placed two cars per powertrain manufacturer per race scored points towards that manufacturer's position in the standings, using the same points system as already implemented for the Drivers' and Teams' Championships.

== Season report ==
=== Pre-season ===
Pre-season testing took place at Valencia on 23–27 October 2023. Jaguar cars topped all three sessions, with Mitch Evans fastest in the first two and Nick Cassidy fastest in the final session. The traditional simulation race was topped by Envision's Robin Frijns. The test was heavily disrupted by a battery fire in the garage of battery supplier Williams Advanced Engineering, caused by a faulty battery. One and a half days of running were cancelled, and the Mahindra cars parked in the garage adjacent to the fire sustained heavy damage. Nyck de Vries' car was too damaged to participate in the rest of the test, with the team being compensated with an extra private test session ahead of the season opener in Mexico City.

=== Opening rounds ===
Porsche's Pascal Wehrlein took pole position for the season-opening Mexico City E-Prix ahead of Envision's Sébastien Buemi. He kept his lead at the start of the race and quickly made an effort to take his two attack mode activations. After he had dropped behind Buemi for his second attack mode, the safety car was called for Frijns hitting the wall in turn 18. On the restart, Wehrlein regained the lead when Buemi took his second attack mode, while Jaguar's Nick Cassidy got into third when Maserati's Maximilian Günther did the same. Cassidy's teammate Mitch Evans, who ran fifth and lacked pace compared to the front group, acted as a roadblock, keeping a train of cars behind him. This meant the upper positions remained static for the rest of the race, with Wehrlein taking a controlled victory, albeit under investigation for a possible technical infringement. This concerned the throttle maps used at the start, with concerns of a use of traction control, but Wehrlein was later cleared to keep his win.

The Diriyah E-Prix double-header began with DS Penske's Jean-Éric Vergne on pole position. ERT's Sérgio Sette Câmara made a strong start from fourth, but had no space to go and fell back behind Evans in second and Andretti's Jake Dennis in third. Vergne fell to second as he took his first attack mode, and he and Evans made contact when the latter then also activated his a lap later. This allowed Dennis to gain a place into second after the first round of attack modes. He continued this trend through the second round and came out in the lead ahead of Vergne. Evans in third tried to use his attack mode to regain lost ground. He took second, but then ran off into turn 18 multiple times, first when attempting to take the lead from Dennis, then when defending from Vergne and a third time on the final lap, which allowed Cassidy through into third. By this time, Dennis' advantage stood at 13 seconds, and with Wehrlein coming eighth, Dennis' win now saw him only a single point behind the German in the standings.

One day later, it was Nissan's Oliver Rowland who took pole position. His lead was short-lived, however, as he got a bad start and was immediately passed by Frijns. Cassidy also overtook him when he took his first attack mode, with the Kiwi then closing up to Frijns and taking the lead when the later activated attack mode. Cassidy then built a gap to Frijns before coincidentally taking his first attack mode right when Frijns took his second. This then allowed him to take his second attack mode right after the first ended and stay in first place. From that point on, the second half of the race saw the order remain largely static, with Cassidy managing his gap to Frijns and Rowland and never coming under serious pressure before taking the win. Both championship leaders had difficult races, with Wehrlein starting in tenth and finishing seventh and Dennis starting 14th and finishing outside the points. Cassidy's win allowed him to take the championship lead, 18 points ahead of Wehrlein.

Next up was the São Paulo E-Prix, where Wehrlein was back on top in qualifying. DS Penske's Stoffel Vandoorne started in second, but did not attack Wehrlein at the start before the energy-preserving peloton-style racing set in. This phase of the race, where leading was a disadvantage as it took more energy, saw the leading group trade first place as they took turns diving off the racing line to activate their attack modes. This group included Wehrlein, Vandoorne, Porsche's António Félix da Costa, Vergne, Evans and McLaren's Sam Bird. This phase was interrupted by championship leader Cassidy crashing into the wall after his damaged front wing was lodged under his car. Evans led at the restart, and with energy saving now no longer a priority, began defending from Bird while simultaneously managing a battery issue. On the final lap of the race, Bird made his move on Evans to take the lead and McLaren's first Formula E win. With Rowland in third and Wehrlein fourth, Cassidy's points lead was reduced to only three points.

The Tokyo E-Prix marked Formula E's debut event in Japan, and Rowland took pole position for Nissan's home race. He was forced to defend from Mahindra's Edoardo Mortara, who had started third and got past Günther. Rowland kept the lead and was able to activate his first attack mode when Günther tried to regain second place from Mortara. With the Swiss then taking his first and Rowland his second attack mode, Günther was shuffled into the lead. This turned into second after his first attack mode, and ten laps from the end Günther managed to surprise Rowland with a lunge into turn ten and take the lead. He built a gap to be able to keep first place through his second attack mode. Mortara had dropped down to fifth by that point, and Rowland was unable to retake the lead despite laying heavy pressure on Günther. Dennis took third on the final lap. Wehrlein and Cassidy both had rather anonymous races to come fifth and eighth, which meant the German now held the championship lead by two points.

Misano marked the beginning of the season's European leg, and Evans took pole position for the first race. The circuit proved to be the most energy-critical yet, with the peloton-style racing reaching new heights. First place changed hands almost every lap, with half the field leading at some stage of the race. This pack racing led to multiple contacts between drivers, forcing both championship leaders to pit for new front wings. Bird was once again among those who looked to have a chance to win before he had to retire after sustaining a rear-right puncture. Six laps from the end, da Costa was leading and began upping the pace, with Rowland following him. The pair traded top spot before da Costa secured the win, with Dennis third. After the race, da Costa was disqualified for a minute technical infringement on his throttle damper springs. Porsche protested, a process that would last until late June, when the FIA would reject the appeal. With Wehrlein and Cassidy not scoring, Rowland took the lead of the standings.

=== Mid-season rounds ===
McLaren's Jake Hughes claimed pole position for the second race at Misano. With the race distance shorter than the day before, energy saving was not as critical, so Hughes elected to keep his lead at the start. Wehrlein moved into second at the start and remained inside the leading group throughout the opening part of the race. Rowland, who had started in tenth, climbed up the order, reaching second place behind Wehrlein at the half-way point. While this also meant he had sustained a sizable energy deficit, he still kept pace with the leader and made his move to take the lead five laps from the end. The pair then gapped Dennis in third, before Rowland's car apparently ran out of energy on the final lap, forcing him out of contention. This saw Wehrlein take the win, with Dennis in second and Cassidy third after overtaking Müller right on the finish line. As Rowland finished 17th, Wehrlein reclaimed the championship lead, albeit by the smallest of margins as Dennis’ recent run of form saw him tie Wehrlein's points tally.

The Monaco E-Prix began with Bird sustaining a wrist injury in opening practice, forcing him to withdraw from the event. His team's reserve driver Taylor Barnard replaced him. Wehrlein took pole position in qualifying and held off Vandoorne at the start, with the Jaguar pair behind. He dropped to fourth after his first attack mode activation, before Vandoorne and Vergne followed suit. After a safety car interruption for Mortara hitting the wall, Vandoorne took attack mode for the second time and dropped behind both Jaguars. This allowed the pair to completely control the race: Cassidy created a gap to the leading Evans to allow him to take both attack modes and remain in the lead. Evans then repaid the favor to Cassidy. This led to an assured Jaguar 1–2, with Evans taking the win, and Vandoorne completing the podium. Wehrlein came home fifth to defend his points lead, while Dennis lacked pace and finished 19th. This allowed Cassidy back into second place in the standings, seven points behind Wehrlein.

Next up was the Berlin E-Prix double-header, and Mortara took pole position and Mahindra's first points of the season. His lead only lasted for two laps, though, before he took his first attack mode. A safety car that interrupted multiple side-by-side battles then brought some confusion about the restart order, before it was Vergne that led the field ahead of Wehrlein, Vandoorne and Mortara. Evans moved from fourth into the lead and tried to activate his attack mode, but failed to do so. This meant he had to attempt to arm it again, which cost him multiple places. He used the extra power to move back to the front, with Vergne in close competition. By this point, Cassidy - who had started in ninth and spent the whole race down in the pack conserving energy - was on the move, climbed up the order and swept past Vergne to take the race lead four laps from the end. He won the race, while Evans dropped to fourth behind Rowland. Wehrlein came fifth, but still had to cede the championship lead to Cassidy by nine points.

Dennis took pole position for Berlin's second race, ahead of Cassidy and Andretti's Norman Nato. The Kiwi took the lead through the first lap and then his first attack mode at the earliest opportunity, with most of the leaders also employing a similar strategy. There was once again a safety car halting proceedings, but when racing resumed, Cassidy climbed back to the front of the order. He led da Costa and Evans, before the Portuguese then took the lead at the half-way point. With everyone bar Evans then taking their second attack modes, the Kiwi took the lead before following suit a few laps later and dropping right into a battle with Cassidy for third. By the time Cassidy was able to overtake Evans, only four laps were left for him to chase down Rowland and da Costa. He made quick work of Rowland a lap later, but was unable to threaten da Costa, who took an assured victory. Still, he was able to extend his lead to 16 points over Wehrlein, who had a rough race to come fourth, making contact with Dennis multiple times.

Formula E then made its debut in Shanghai, and Vergne claimed pole position for the first race. Rowland in second had a bad start and dropped behind Wehrlein and Evans. The two Porsche cars worked together throughout the first phase of attack mode activations, but Evans came out on top on lap 7. Wehrlein and da Costa managed to both move back past him later on and looked set to control the rest of the race, before Evans then used a slight energy advantage to overtake da Costa and claim second place. Cassidy, who had started down the order and remained there to save energy once again, had climbed to fourth by lap 23, with an energy surplus of three percent in hand. He also overtook da Costa to move into third, while Wehrlein had to drive more and more in defense of Evans. He tried to take the lead lap after lap, with Cassidy ordered by the team to hold third despite his energy advantage. Evans passed Wehrlein on the final lap to take the win, with Cassidy's lead over Wehrlein now down to 13 points.

Race two of the weekend saw Hughes take pole position by a single thousandth of a second ahead of Vandoorne. The Belgian had the better start, though, and took the lead, with da Costa following through into second place a lap later. Nato then used an early attack mode activation to move into the lead, with da Costa his closest challenger and the pair trading top spot throughout the rest of their attack mode strategy. On lap 12, Wehrlein made contact with Bird and suffered a puncture, forcing him to pit and out of contention. A few laps later, da Costa again took the lead from Nato and, with a sizable energy advantage in hand, quickly built a gap while the Frenchman dropped behind Hughes into third. The McLaren driver then set out to challenge da Costa, but could not stop him from winning the race. Cassidy came fourth, lucky to only damage his front wing in an earlier collision with Hughes. As Wehrlein did not score, the championship momentum was back in Cassidy's favor, with the gap now up to 25 points.

=== Closing rounds ===
The penultimate weekend of the season at Portland opened with Evans taking pole position ahead of Hughes. Once again, energy management was crucial and so the lead changed hands multiple times throughout the opening stint of the race. Locked in a battle, Evans forced Hughes off the road and was awarded a five-second time penalty for causing a collision. Championship leader Cassidy once again employed his strategy of staying in the pack to conserve energy before climbing up the order. This saw him hit the front of the field on lap 12, ahead of da Costa. The lead pair then began upping their pace, trading the lead multiple times before Evans took second off da Costa on lap 24. On the penultimate lap, Cassidy made a pivotal mistake, running off track and spinning into the final corner. Evans finished the race first, but his penalty dropped him to eighth, handing da Costa the win ahead of Frijns and Vergne. Wehrlein missed the chance to sizably shorten his points gap to Cassidy as he only came tenth.

Vergne took pole for Portland's second race to become the driver with the most pole positions in series history. Saturday's winner da Costa continued right where he left off as he took the lead right at the start. When his teammate Wehrlein then made contact with Mortara, his frontwing got loose before flying off and hitting Bird, sending the Briton into retirement. Cassidy was also in trouble when his previously proven strategy of saving energy by staying in the pack backfired and he was part of a three-car collision into the first turn.While Wehrlein was able to continue, Cassidy was forced to pit with a damaged nose, ending his hopes of a points finish. At the front, the lead changed hands multiple times before a brief safety car was called for debris. Da Costa took the lead on the restart and resisted pressure from Frijns to take his third win in a row. Evans took third from Wehrlein late in the race, with both drivers now only 12 points behind Cassidy. Da Costa also kept his outside title chance, 33 points off the lead.

Pole position for the penultimate race of the season in London went to Evans, reducing his gap to Cassidy, who would start 14th, to nine points. He led throughout a tumultuous opening part of the race where a safety car was needed after Frijns hit the wall and took out Bird in the process. Cassidy, down in 15th at that point, had two robust battles with Dennis and Vandoorne that saw him damage his steering. Evans then ceded the lead to Buemi when he took attack mode, but retook first place shortly after, with Wehrlein following him through and then moving ahead with a decisive pass. He immediately built a gap to take his second attack mode, coming out side by side with Evans but taking the lead into the next turn. From that point on, Wehrlein was in control of proceedings while Evans had to defend from Günther behind before the German suffered a gearbox issue to hand Buemi a podium. Cassidy managed to salvage a seventh-place finish, so Wehrlein entered the final race with a seven-point lead.

Despite missing the final practice session with a brake issue, Cassidy took a sensational pole position for the final race to set up an all-out finale. He kept his lead at the start while Evans moved into second place, with the Jaguar pair then controlling the opening of the race. On lap 6, Wehrlein made an important move past Günther to secure third place and close right up to the leaders.Cassidy's first attack mode was covered off by Evans, allowing him to keep the lead, but the second time round, Cassidy dropped behind Evans and crucially also behind Wehrlein. Cassidy, with both attack modes done, was then hit by da Costa and suffered a puncture. This took him out of title contention, while Rowland took the race lead as a timely safety car was then called for debris. After the restart, Evans tried activating his second attack mode ahead of Wehrlein, but failed the activation process and had to try again the next lap, allowing Wehrlein past him into second. The German therefore won the world championship, six points ahead of Evans.

Formula E's tenth season once again offered a close title battle as Wehrlein and Porsche finally managed to continue their strong form into the latter stages of the year after failing to do so the years prior. While Cassidy looked in prime contention for the title up until the penultimate weekend, a bleak Portland double-header completely swung the momentum of the battle. That then set up another thrilling finale in which Cassidy was removed from title contention by a collision in which he had no fault in for the second year in a row. Apart from the championship fight, the championship received mixed opinions: While its on-track product remained unique and well-liked, extremely complex steward decisions confused fans and media alike, the extreme peloton-style racing drew criticism from drivers and viewership figures declined amid the series’ key market in the UK moving behind a paywall.

== Results and standings ==
=== E-Prix ===
Round	E-Prix	Pole position	Fastest lap	Winning driver	Winning team	Winning manufacturer	Report
1	Mexico City	(Germany) Pascal Wehrlein	(New Zealand) Nick Cassidy	(Germany) Pascal Wehrlein	(Germany) TAG Heuer Porsche Formula E Team	(Germany) Porsche	Report
2	(Saudi Arabia) Diriyah	(France) Jean-Éric Vergne	(United Kingdom) Jake Dennis	(United Kingdom) Jake Dennis	(United States) Andretti Formula E	(Germany) Porsche	Report
3	(Saudi Arabia) Diriyah	(United Kingdom) Oliver Rowland	(United Kingdom) Jake Dennis (Note: Jake Dennis set the fastest lap, but did not finish in the top 10, so was ineligible to be the point-scorer for the fastest lap. Nick Cassidy was the point-scorer instead for setting the fastest lap of those finishing in the top 10.)	(New Zealand) Nick Cassidy	(United Kingdom) Jaguar TCS Racing	(United Kingdom) Jaguar	Report
4	(Brazil) São Paulo	(Germany) Pascal Wehrlein	(Netherlands) Nyck de Vries (Note: Nyck de Vries set the fastest lap, but did not finish in the top 10, so was ineligible to be the point-scorer for the fastest lap. Sébastien Buemi was the point-scorer instead for setting the fastest lap of those finishing in the top 10.)	(United Kingdom) Sam Bird	(United Kingdom) NEOM McLaren Formula E Team	(Japan) Nissan	Report
5	(Japan) Tokyo	(United Kingdom) Oliver Rowland	(United Kingdom) Sam Bird (Note: Sam Bird set the fastest lap, but did not finish in the top 10, so was ineligible to be the point-scorer for the fastest lap. Maximilian Günther was the point-scorer instead for setting the fastest lap of those finishing in the top 10.)	(Germany) Maximilian Günther	(Monaco) Maserati MSG Racing	(Netherlands) Stellantis	Report
6	(Italy) Misano	(New Zealand) Mitch Evans	(United Kingdom) Oliver Rowland	(United Kingdom) Oliver Rowland	(Japan) Nissan Formula E Team	(Japan) Nissan	Report
7	(Italy) Misano	(United Kingdom) Jake Hughes	(Portugal) António Félix da Costa (Note: António Félix da Costa set the fastest lap, but did not finish in the top 10, so was ineligible to be the point-scorer for the fastest lap. Pascal Wehrlein was the point-scorer instead for setting the fastest lap of those finishing in the top 10.)	(Germany) Pascal Wehrlein	(Germany) TAG Heuer Porsche Formula E Team	(Germany) Porsche	Report
8	Monaco	(Germany) Pascal Wehrlein	(India) Jehan Daruvala (Note: Jehan Daruvala set the fastest lap, but did not finish in the top 10, so was ineligible to be the point-scorer for the fastest lap. Nick Cassidy was the point-scorer instead for setting the fastest lap of those finishing in the top 10.)	(New Zealand) Mitch Evans	(United Kingdom) Jaguar TCS Racing	(United Kingdom) Jaguar	Report
9	(Germany) Berlin	(Switzerland) Edoardo Mortara	(France) Norman Nato (Note: Norman Nato set the fastest lap, but did not finish in the top 10, so was ineligible to be the point-scorer for the fastest lap. Nick Cassidy was the point-scorer instead for setting the fastest lap of those finishing in the top 10.)	(New Zealand) Nick Cassidy	(United Kingdom) Jaguar TCS Racing	(United Kingdom) Jaguar	Report
10	(Germany) Berlin	(United Kingdom) Jake Dennis	(France) Norman Nato (Note: Norman Nato set the fastest lap, but did not finish in the top 10, so was ineligible to be the point-scorer for the fastest lap. Nick Cassidy was the point-scorer instead for setting the fastest lap of those finishing in the top 10.)	(Portugal) António Félix da Costa	(Germany) TAG Heuer Porsche Formula E Team	(Germany) Porsche	Report
11	(China) Shanghai	(France) Jean-Éric Vergne	(United Kingdom) Jake Dennis	(New Zealand) Mitch Evans	(United Kingdom) Jaguar TCS Racing	(United Kingdom) Jaguar	Report
12	(China) Shanghai	(United Kingdom) Jake Hughes	(France) Norman Nato	(Portugal) António Félix da Costa	(Germany) TAG Heuer Porsche Formula E Team	(Germany) Porsche	Report
13	(United States) Portland	(New Zealand) Mitch Evans	(United Kingdom) Jake Hughes (Note: Jake Hughes set the fastest lap, but did not finish in the top 10, so was ineligible to be the point-scorer for the fastest lap. Mitch Evans was the point-scorer instead for setting the fastest lap of those finishing in the top 10.)	(Portugal) António Félix da Costa	(Germany) TAG Heuer Porsche Formula E Team	(Germany) Porsche	Report
14	(United States) Portland	(France) Jean-Éric Vergne	(Netherlands) Robin Frijns	(Portugal) António Félix da Costa	(Germany) TAG Heuer Porsche Formula E Team	(Germany) Porsche	Report
15	(United Kingdom) London	(New Zealand) Mitch Evans	(New Zealand) Mitch Evans	(Germany) Pascal Wehrlein	(Germany) TAG Heuer Porsche Formula E Team	(Germany) Porsche	Report
16	(United Kingdom) London	(New Zealand) Nick Cassidy	(United Kingdom) Jake Hughes	(United Kingdom) Oliver Rowland	(Japan) Nissan Formula E Team	(Japan) Nissan	Report

=== Drivers' Championship ===
Points were awarded using the following structure:

Position	1st	2nd	3rd	4th	5th	6th	7th	8th	9th	10th	Pole	FL
Points	25	18	15	12	10	8	6	4	2	1	3	1

Pos.	Driver	MEX (Mexico)	DRH (Saudi Arabia)		SAP (Brazil)	TKO (Japan)	ITA (Italy)		MCO (Monaco)	BER (Germany)		SHA (China)		POR (United States)		LDN (United Kingdom)		Pts
1	(Germany) Pascal Wehrlein	**1**	8	7	**4**	5	16	1	**5**	5	4	2	20	10	4	1	2	198
2	(New Zealand) Mitch Evans	5	5	10	2	15	**5**	NC	1	4	6	1	5	**8**	3	**2**	3	192
3	(New Zealand) Nick Cassidy	3	3	1	Ret	8	Ret	3	2	1	2	3	4	19	13	7	**Ret**	176
4	(United Kingdom) Oliver Rowland	11	13	**3**	3	**2**	1	Ret	6	3	3	4	10	WD	WD	15	1	156
5	(France) Jean-Éric Vergne	6	**2**	8	7	12	6	7	4	2	10	**6**	7	3	**5**	17	5	139
6	(Portugal) António Félix da Costa	Ret	16	14	6	4	DSQ	17	7	6	1	18	1	1	1	Ret	13	134
7	(United Kingdom) Jake Dennis	9	1	12	5	3	2	2	19	Ret	**5**	5	12	6	10	16	Ret	122
8	(Germany) Maximilian Günther	4	7	9	9	1	3	12	9	Ret	Ret	21	8	Ret	8	Ret	Ret	73
9	(Netherlands) Robin Frijns	Ret	10	2	18	9	17	Ret	17			12	9	2	2	Ret	7	66
10	(Belgium) Stoffel Vandoorne	8	14	5	8	16	8	Ret	3	7	20	9	6	9	11	9	8	61
11	(Switzerland) Sébastien Buemi	2	12	WD	10	13	12	Ret	15			8	12	20	9	3	4	53
12	(Switzerland) Nico Müller	17	18	13	Ret	7	11	4	Ret			15	15	5	6	6	6	52
13	(United Kingdom) Sam Bird	14	4	Ret	1	NC	Ret	10	WD			17	Ret	7	Ret	8	Ret	48
14	(United Kingdom) Jake Hughes	7	11	4	Ret	14	13	**8**	16	15	12	16	**2**	21	Ret	Ret	10	48
15	(France) Norman Nato	10	6	16	17	6	7	16	10	18	19	14	3	13	7	10	12	47
16	(Switzerland) Edoardo Mortara	13	15	11	12	DSQ	Ret	13	Ret	**8**	16	Ret	13	4	Ret	5	Ret	29
17	(France) Sacha Fenestraz	12	Ret	6	11	11	9	5	8	9	Ret	11	14	15	18	14	15	26
18	(Netherlands) Nyck de Vries	15	17	15	14	Ret	14	15	12			7	16	12	Ret	4	16	18
19	(United Kingdom) Dan Ticktum	18	21	Ret	16	18	4	14	13	14	17	20	21	17	15	13	14	12
20	(Brazil) Sérgio Sette Câmara	DNS	9	18	DSQ	10	15	6	18	16	13	13	18	14	14	12	11	11
21	(India) Jehan Daruvala	16	20	Ret	15	17	Ret	9	20	17	7	19	17	16	12	18	Ret	8
22	(United Kingdom) Taylor Barnard								14	10	8							5
23	(Brazil) Lucas di Grassi	Ret	19	17	13	Ret	10	11	11	Ret	11	10	19	11	17	11	9	4
24	(Sweden) Joel Eriksson									Ret	9							2
25	(South Africa) Kelvin van der Linde									11	15							0
26	(United Kingdom) Jordan King									12	18							0
27	(Estonia) Paul Aron									13	14							0
28	(Brazil) Caio Collet													18	16			0
Pos.	Driver	MEX (Mexico)	DRH (Saudi Arabia)		SAP (Brazil)	TKO (Japan)	ITA (Italy)		MCO (Monaco)	BER (Germany)		SHA (China)		POR (United States)		LDN (United Kingdom)		Pts

Colour	Result
Gold	Winner
Silver	Second place
Bronze	Third place
Green	Points classification
Blue	Non-points classification
Blue	Non-classified finish (NC)
Purple	Retired, not classified (Ret)
Red	Did not qualify (DNQ)
Red	Did not pre-qualify (DNPQ)
Black	Disqualified (DSQ)
White	Did not start (DNS)
White	Withdrew (WD)
White	Race cancelled (C)
Blank	Did not practice (DNP)
Blank	Did not arrive (DNA)
Blank	Excluded (EX)

**Bold** – Pole

Italics – Fastest lap

=== Teams' Championship ===
Pos.	Team	No.	MEX (Mexico)	DRH (Saudi Arabia)		SAP (Brazil)	TKO (Japan)	ITA (Italy)		MCO (Monaco)	BER (Germany)		SHA (China)		POR (United States)		LDN (United Kingdom)		Pts
1	(United Kingdom) Jaguar TCS Racing	9	5	5	10	2	15	**5**	NC	1	4	6	1	5	**8**	3	**2**	3	368
1	(United Kingdom) Jaguar TCS Racing	37	3	3	1	Ret	8	Ret	3	2	1	2	3	4	19	13	7	**Ret**	368
2	(Germany) TAG Heuer Porsche Formula E Team	13	Ret	16	14	6	4	DSQ	19	7	6	1	18	1	1	1	Ret	13	332
2	(Germany) TAG Heuer Porsche Formula E Team	94	**1**	8	7	**4**	5	16	1	**5**	5	4	2	20	10	4	1	2	332
3	(United States) DS Penske	2	8	14	5	8	16	8	Ret	3	7	20	9	6	9	11	9	8	200
3	(United States) DS Penske	25	6	**2**	8	7	12	6	7	4	2	10	**6**	7	3	**5**	17	5	200
4	(Japan) Nissan Formula E Team	22	11	13	**3**	3	**2**	1	Ret	6	3	3	4	10	18	16	15	1	182
4	(Japan) Nissan Formula E Team	23	12	Ret	6	11	11	9	5	8	9	Ret	11	14	15	18	14	15	182
5	(United States) Andretti Formula E	1	9	1	12	5	3	2	2	20	Ret	**5**	5	11	6	10	16	Ret	169
5	(United States) Andretti Formula E	17	10	6	16	17	6	7	18	10	18	19	14	3	13	7	10	12	169
6	(United Kingdom) Envision Racing	4	Ret	10	2	18	9	17	Ret	17	Ret	9	12	9	2	2	Ret	7	121
6	(United Kingdom) Envision Racing	16	2	12	WD	10	13	12	Ret	15	13	14	8	12	20	9	3	4	121
7	(United Kingdom) NEOM McLaren Formula E Team	5	7	11	4	Ret	14	13	**8**	16	15	12	16	**2**	21	Ret	Ret	10	101
7	(United Kingdom) NEOM McLaren Formula E Team	8	14	4	Ret	1	NC	Ret	10	14	10	8	17	Ret	7	Ret	8	Ret	101
8	(Monaco) Maserati MSG Racing	7	4	7	9	9	1	3	12	9	Ret	Ret	21	8	Ret	8	Ret	Ret	81
8	(Monaco) Maserati MSG Racing	18	16	20	Ret	15	17	Ret	9	18	17	7	19	17	16	12	18	Ret	81
9	(Germany) ABT CUPRA Formula E Team	11	Ret	19	17	13	Ret	10	12	11	Ret	11	10	19	11	17	11	9	56
9	(Germany) ABT CUPRA Formula E Team	51	17	18	13	Ret	7	11	4	Ret	11	15	15	15	5	6	6	6	56
10	(India) Mahindra Racing	21	15	17	15	14	Ret	14	15	12	12	18	7	16	12	Ret	4	16	47
10	(India) Mahindra Racing	48	13	15	11	12	DSQ	Ret	13	Ret	**8**	16	Ret	13	4	Ret	5	Ret	47
11	(China) ERT Formula E Team	3	DNS	9	18	DSQ	10	15	6	19	16	13	13	18	14	14	12	11	23
11	(China) ERT Formula E Team	33	18	21	Ret	16	18	4	14	13	14	17	20	21	17	15	13	14	23
Pos.	Team	No.	MEX (Mexico)	DRH (Saudi Arabia)		SAP (Brazil)	TKO (Japan)	ITA (Italy)		MCO (Monaco)	BER (Germany)		SHA (China)		POR (United States)		LDN (United Kingdom)		Pts

=== Manufacturers' Trophy ===
The highest-placed two cars per powertrain manufacturer per race scored points towards that manufacturer's position in the standings.

Pos.	Manufacturer	MEX (Mexico)	DRH (Saudi Arabia)		SAP (Brazil)	TKO (Japan)	ITA (Italy)		MCO (Monaco)	BER (Germany)		SHA (China)		POR (United States)		LDN (United Kingdom)		Pts
1	(United Kingdom) Jaguar	2	3	1	2	8	**5**	3	1	1	2	1	4	2	2	**2**	3	455
1	(United Kingdom) Jaguar	3	5	2	10	9	12	Ret	2	4	6	3	5	**8**	3	3	4	455
2	(Germany) Porsche	**1**	1	7	**4**	3	2	1	**5**	5	1	2	1	1	1	1	2	451
2	(Germany) Porsche	9	6	12	5	4	7	2	7	6	4	5	3	6	4	10	12	451
3	(Japan) Nissan	7	4	**3**	1	**2**	1	5	6	3	3	4	**2**	7	16	8	1	273
3	(Japan) Nissan	11	11	4	3	11	9	**8**	8	9	8	11	20	15	18	14	10	273
4	(Netherlands) Stellantis (Note: Includes points scored by the DS E-Tense FE23 and the Maserati Tipo Folgore, which are rebadged variants of the same powertrain.)	4	**2**	5	7	1	3	7	3	2	7	**6**	6	3	**5**	9	5	263
4	(Netherlands) Stellantis	6	7	8	8	12	6	9	4	7	10	9	7	9	8	17	8	263
5	(India) Mahindra	13	15	11	12	7	10	4	11	**8**	11	7	13	4	6	4	6	95
5	(India) Mahindra	15	17	13	13	Ret	11	11	12	11	15	10	15	5	17	5	9	95
6	(China) Electric Racing Technologies	18	9	17	16	10	4	6	13	14	13	13	18	14	14	12	11	23
6	(China) Electric Racing Technologies	DNS	21	Ret	17	18	15	14	18	16	17	20	21	17	15	13	14	23
Pos.	Manufacturer	MEX (Mexico)	DRH (Saudi Arabia)		SAP (Brazil)	TKO (Japan)	ITA (Italy)		MCO (Monaco)	BER (Germany)		SHA (China)		POR (United States)		LDN (United Kingdom)		Pts
