= 2024 Diriyah ePrix =

Race 2 of 16 of the 2023–24 Formula E season
← Previous race	Next race →
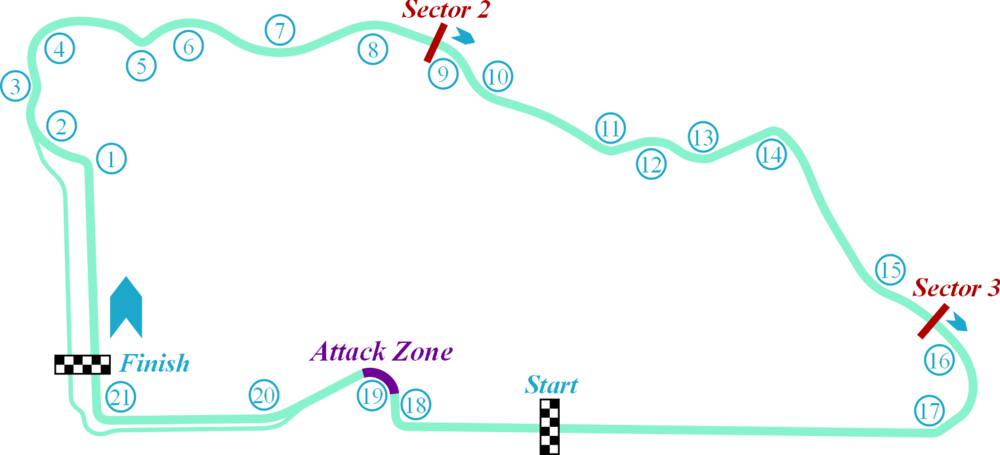

Race details
- Date: 26 January 2024
- Official name: 2024 Diriyah E-Prix
- Location: Riyadh Street Circuit, Diriyah, Riyadh, Saudi Arabia
- Course: Street circuit
- Course length: 2.495 km (1.550 mi)
- Distance: 37 laps, 92.315 km (57.362 mi)

Pole position
Driver	(France) Jean-Éric Vergne	DS Penske
- Time: 1:12.062

Fastest lap
Driver	(United Kingdom) Jake Dennis	Andretti-Porsche
- Time: 1:11.399 on lap 36

Podium
First	(United Kingdom) Jake Dennis	Andretti-Porsche
Second	(France) Jean-Éric Vergne	DS
Third	(New Zealand) Nick Cassidy	Jaguar

2024 Diriyah ePrix
Race 3 of 16 of the 2023–24 Formula E season
← Previous race	Next race →
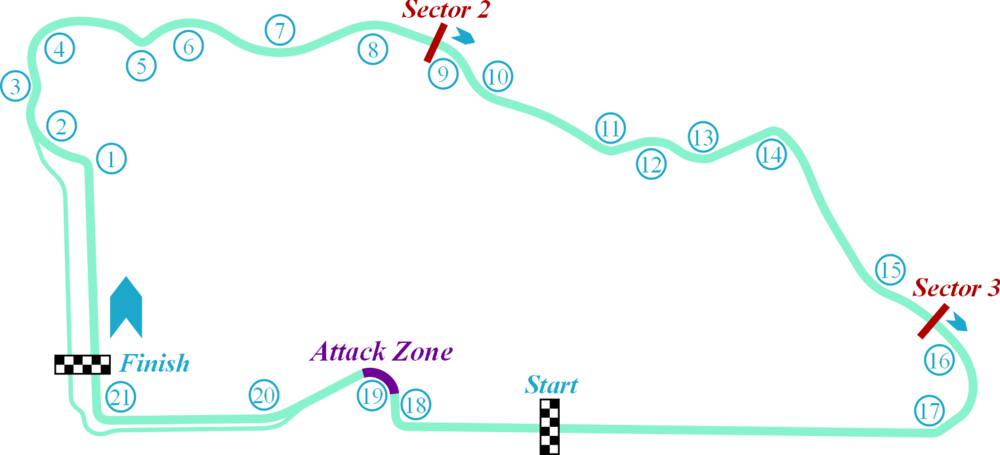

Race details
- Date: 27 January 2024
- Official name: 2024 Diriyah E-Prix
- Location: Riyadh Street Circuit, Diriyah, Riyadh, Saudi Arabia
- Course: Street circuit
- Course length: 2.495 km (1.550 mi)
- Distance: 36 laps, 89.820 km (55.812 mi)

Pole position
Driver	(United Kingdom) Oliver Rowland	Nissan
- Time: 1:10.055

Fastest lap
Driver	(United Kingdom) Jake Dennis; Nick Cassidy (Note: The point was awarded to Cassidy as Dennis did not finish in the top 10.)	Andretti-Porsche
- Time: 1:10.296 on lap 33

Podium
First	(New Zealand) Nick Cassidy	Jaguar
Second	(Netherlands) Robin Frijns	Envision-Jaguar
Third	(United Kingdom) Oliver Rowland	Nissan

The 2024 Diriyah ePrix was a pair of Formula E electric car races held at the Riyadh Street Circuit in the town of Diriyah, north west of Riyadh, in Saudi Arabia on the 26 and 27 January 2024. It served as the second round of the 2023–24 Formula E season, the sixth and final edition of the Diriyah ePrix and the fourth time the event was held at night.

== Background ==
Following a win from pole in the first round in Mexico City. Pascal Wehrlein led the championship with 28 points. Sébastien Buemi was second, 10 points behind, and Nick Cassidy was third, 12 points behind.

== Classification ==
(All times are in AST).

=== Race 1 ===
==== Qualifying ====
Qualifying for race 1 took place at 3:20 PM on 26 January.

Group draw
Group A	(Germany) WEH	(New Zealand) CAS	(New Zealand) EVA	(United Kingdom) HUG	(United Kingdom) DEN	(United Kingdom) ROW	(Switzerland) MOR	(Netherlands) DEV	(Switzerland) MUE	(Netherlands) FRI	(Brazil) DIG
Group B	(Switzerland) BUE	(Germany) GUE	(France) JEV	(Belgium) VAN	(France) NAT	(France) FEN	(United Kingdom) BIR	(India) DAR	(United Kingdom) TIC	(Portugal) DAC	(Brazil) SET

==== Qualifying duels ====
Quarter-finals
A3	(Germany) Pascal Wehrlein
A2	(United Kingdom) Jake Dennis
A4	(New Zealand) Mitch Evans
A1	(New Zealand) Nick Cassidy
B3	(Germany) Maximilian Günther
B2	(Brazil) Sérgio Sette Câmara
B4	(France) Norman Nato
B1	(France) Jean-Éric Vergne

Semi-finals
(United Kingdom) Jake Dennis
(New Zealand) Mitch Evans
(Brazil) Sérgio Sette Câmara
(France) Jean-Éric Vergne

Final
(New Zealand) Mitch Evans
(France) Jean-Éric Vergne

==== Overall classification ====
Pos.	No.	Driver	Team	A	B	QF	SF	F	Grid
1	25	(France) Jean-Éric Vergne	DS	—N/a	1:12.856	1:12.164	1:12.125	1:12.062	1
2	9	(New Zealand) Mitch Evans	Jaguar	1:13.006	—N/a	1:12.313	1:11.992	1:12.134	2
3	1	(United Kingdom) Jake Dennis	Andretti-Porsche	1:12.779	—N/a	1:12.527	1:12.079	—N/a	3
4	3	(Brazil) Sérgio Sette Câmara	ERT	—N/a	1:12.897	1:12.495	1:12.611	—N/a	4
5	17	(France) Norman Nato	Andretti-Porsche	—N/a	1:12.933	1:12.475	—N/a	—N/a	5
6	94	(Germany) Pascal Wehrlein	Porsche	1:12.872	—N/a	1:12.610	—N/a	—N/a	6
7	37	(New Zealand) Nick Cassidy	Jaguar	1:12.619	—N/a	1:12.821	—N/a	—N/a	7
8	7	(Germany) Maximilian Günther	Maserati	—N/a	1:12.931	1:12.892	—N/a	—N/a	8
9	8	(United Kingdom) Sam Bird	McLaren-Nissan	—N/a	1:13.147	—N/a	—N/a	—N/a	9
10	5	(United Kingdom) Jake Hughes	McLaren-Nissan	1:13.207	—N/a	—N/a	—N/a	—N/a	10
11	2	(Belgium) Stoffel Vandoorne	DS	—N/a	1:13.167	—N/a	—N/a	—N/a	11
12	4	(Netherlands) Robin Frijns	Envision-Jaguar	1:13.272	—N/a	—N/a	—N/a	—N/a	12
13	16	(Switzerland) Sébastien Buemi	Envision-Jaguar	—N/a	1:13.186	—N/a	—N/a	—N/a	13
14	22	(United Kingdom) Oliver Rowland	Nissan	1:13.350	—N/a	—N/a	—N/a	—N/a	14
15	23	(France) Sacha Fenestraz	Nissan	—N/a	1:13.294	—N/a	—N/a	—N/a	15
16	51	(Switzerland) Nico Müller	ABT-Mahindra	1:13.531	—N/a	—N/a	—N/a	—N/a	16
17	13	(Portugal) António Félix da Costa	Porsche	—N/a	1:13.367	—N/a	—N/a	—N/a	20 (Note: Da Costa received a three-place grid penalty for causing a collision with Nico Müller at the previous race.)
18	11	(Brazil) Lucas di Grassi	ABT-Mahindra	1:13.729	—N/a	—N/a	—N/a	—N/a	17
19	33	(United Kingdom) Dan Ticktum	ERT	—N/a	1:13.446	—N/a	—N/a	—N/a	18
20	48	(Switzerland) Edoardo Mortara	Mahindra	1:13.791	—N/a	—N/a	—N/a	—N/a	19
21	18	(India) Jehan Daruvala	Maserati	—N/a	1:14.054	—N/a	—N/a	—N/a	21
22	21	(Netherlands) Nyck de Vries	Mahindra	1:14.254	—N/a	—N/a	—N/a	—N/a	22

==== Race ====
Race 1 started at 8:04 PM on 26 January.

Pos.	No.	Driver	Team	Laps	Time/Retired	Grid	Points
1	1	(United Kingdom) Jake Dennis	Andretti-Porsche	37	45:56.452	3	25+1^{2}
2	25	(France) Jean-Éric Vergne	DS	37	+13.289	1	18+3^{1}
3	37	(New Zealand) Nick Cassidy	Jaguar	37	+13.824	7	15
4	8	(United Kingdom) Sam Bird	McLaren-Nissan	37	+14.620	9	12
5	9	(New Zealand) Mitch Evans	Jaguar	37	+15.174	2	10
6	17	(France) Norman Nato	Andretti-Porsche	37	+15.661	5	8
7	7	(Germany) Maximilian Günther	Maserati	37	+16.267	8	6
8	94	(Germany) Pascal Wehrlein	Porsche	37	+16.387	6	4
9	3	(Brazil) Sérgio Sette Câmara	ERT	37	+26.606	4	2
10	4	(Netherlands) Robin Frijns	Envision-Jaguar	37	+26.968	12	1
11	5	(United Kingdom) Jake Hughes	McLaren-Nissan	37	+27.021	10	
12	16	(Switzerland) Sébastien Buemi	Envision-Jaguar	37	+27.472	13	
13	22	(United Kingdom) Oliver Rowland	Nissan	37	+27.973	14	
14	2	(Belgium) Stoffel Vandoorne	DS	37	+28.366	11	
15	48	(Switzerland) Edoardo Mortara	Mahindra	37	+29.397	19	
16	13	(Portugal) António Félix da Costa	Porsche	37	+29.885	20	
17	21	(Netherlands) Nyck de Vries	Mahindra	37	+30.419	22	
18	51	(Switzerland) Nico Müller	ABT-Mahindra	37	+30.884	16	
19	11	(Brazil) Lucas di Grassi	ABT-Mahindra	37	+31.188	17	
20	18	(India) Jehan Daruvala	Maserati	37	+31.541	21	
21	33	(United Kingdom) Dan Ticktum	ERT	37	+1:04.712	18	
Ret	23	(France) Sacha Fenestraz	Nissan	12	Suspension damage	15	

Notes:

- ^1 – Pole position.
- ^2 – Fastest lap.

==== Standings after the race ====
Drivers' Championship standings

	Pos	Driver	Points
	1	(Germany) Pascal Wehrlein	32
1	2	(New Zealand) Nick Cassidy	31
3	3	(France) Jean-Éric Vergne	29
5	4	(United Kingdom) Jake Dennis	28
	5	(New Zealand) Mitch Evans	20

Teams' Championship standings

	Pos	Team	Points
1	1	(United Kingdom) Jaguar	51
4	2	(United States) Andretti	37
2	3	(United States) DS Penske	33
3	4	(Germany) Porsche	32
2	5	(United Kingdom) Envision	19

Manufacturers' Trophy standings

	Pos	Manufacturer	Points
1	1	(Germany) Porsche	64
1	2	(United Kingdom) Jaguar	59
	3	(Netherlands) Stellantis	47
	4	(Japan) Nissan	18
1	5	(China) ERT	2

- Notes: Only the top five positions are included for all three sets of standings.

=== Race 2 ===
==== Qualifying ====
Qualifying for race 2 took place at 3:20 PM on 27 January.

Group draw
Group A	(Germany) WEH	(France) JEV	(New Zealand) EVA	(Germany) GUE	(France) NAT	(Belgium) VAN	(Brazil) SET	(France) FEN	(Netherlands) DEV	(Portugal) DAC	(United Kingdom) TIC
Group B	(New Zealand) CAS	(United Kingdom) DEN	(Switzerland) BUE	(United Kingdom) BIR	(United Kingdom) HUG	(United Kingdom) ROW	(Netherlands) FRI	(Switzerland) MOR	(India) DAR	(Switzerland) MUE	(Brazil) DIG

==== Qualifying duels ====
Quarter-finals
A3	(France) Jean-Éric Vergne
A2	(Netherlands) Robin Frijns
A4	(Belgium) Stoffel Vandoorne
A1	(France) Sacha Fenestraz
B3	(United Kingdom) Jake Hughes
B2	(New Zealand) Nick Cassidy
B4	(India) Jehan Daruvala
B1	(United Kingdom) Oliver Rowland

Semi-finals
(Netherlands) Robin Frijns
(Belgium) Stoffel Vandoorne
(New Zealand) Nick Cassidy
(United Kingdom) Oliver Rowland

Final
(Netherlands) Robin Frijns
(United Kingdom) Oliver Rowland

==== Overall classification ====
Pos.	No.	Driver	Team	A	B	QF	SF	F	Grid
1	22	(United Kingdom) Oliver Rowland	Nissan	—N/a	1:10:486	1:10:149	1:10:098	1:10:055	1
2	4	(Netherlands) Robin Frijns	Envision-Jaguar	1:10:784	—N/a	1:10:885	1:10:415	1:10:320	2
3	37	(New Zealand) Nick Cassidy	Jaguar	—N/a	1:10:760	1:10:385	1:10:295	—N/a	3
4	2	(Belgium) Stoffel Vandoorne	DS	1:10:836	—N/a	1:10:539	1:10:627	—N/a	4
5	18	(India) Jehan Daruvala	Maserati	—N/a	1:10:904	1:10:786	—N/a	—N/a	5
6	5	(United Kingdom) Jake Hughes	McLaren-Nissan	—N/a	1:10:847	1:10:994	—N/a	—N/a	6
7	23	(France) Sacha Fenestraz	Nissan	1:10:641	—N/a	1:11:077	—N/a	—N/a	7
8	25	(France) Jean-Éric Vergne	DS	1:10:801	—N/a	1:11.112	—N/a	—N/a	8
9	3	(Brazil) Sérgio Sette Câmara	ERT	—N/a	1:10.986	—N/a	—N/a	—N/a	9
10	94	(Germany) Pascal Wehrlein	Porsche	1:10.946	—N/a	—N/a	—N/a	—N/a	10
11	16	(Switzerland) Sébastien Buemi	Envision-Jaguar	—N/a	1:11.152	—N/a	—N/a	—N/a	11
12	7	(Germany) Maximilian Günther	Maserati	1:10.993	—N/a	—N/a	—N/a	—N/a	12
13	8	(United Kingdom) Sam Bird	McLaren-Nissan	—N/a	1:11.165	—N/a	—N/a	—N/a	13
14	9	(New Zealand) Mitch Evans	Jaguar	1:11.042	—N/a	—N/a	—N/a	—N/a	14
15	1	(United Kingdom) Jake Dennis	Andretti-Porsche	—N/a	1:11.228	—N/a	—N/a	—N/a	15
16	33	(United Kingdom) Dan Ticktum	ERT	1:11.307	—N/a	—N/a	—N/a	—N/a	16
17	51	(Switzerland) Nico Müller	ABT-Mahindra	—N/a	1:11:368	—N/a	—N/a	—N/a	17
18	21	(Netherlands) Nyck de Vries	Mahindra	1:11.327	—N/a	—N/a	—N/a	—N/a	18
19	48	(Switzerland) Edoardo Mortara	Mahindra	—N/a	1:11:386	—N/a	—N/a	—N/a	19
20	17	(France) Norman Nato	Andretti-Porsche	1:11.390	—N/a	—N/a	—N/a	—N/a	20
21	11	(Brazil) Lucas di Grassi	ABT-Mahindra	—N/a	1:11.806	—N/a	—N/a	—N/a	21
22	13	(Portugal) António Félix da Costa	Porsche	1:11.662	—N/a	—N/a	—N/a	—N/a	22

==== Race ====
Race 2 started at 8:04 PM on 27 January.

Pos.	No.	Driver	Team	Laps	Time/Retired	Grid	Points
1	37	(New Zealand) Nick Cassidy	Jaguar	36	43:51:868	3	25+1^{2}
2	4	(Netherlands) Robin Frijns	Envision-Jaguar	36	+1.192	2	18
3	22	(United Kingdom) Oliver Rowland	Nissan	36	+1.875	1	15+3^{1}
4	5	(United Kingdom) Jake Hughes	McLaren-Nissan	36	+2.931	6	12
5	2	(Belgium) Stoffel Vandoorne	DS	36	+3.397	4	10
6	23	(France) Sacha Fenestraz	Nissan	36	+4.598	7	8
7	94	(Germany) Pascal Wehrlein	Porsche	36	+4.816	10	6
8	25	(France) Jean-Éric Vergne	DS	36	+5.195	8	4
9	7	(Germany) Maximilian Günther	Maserati	36	+5.709	12	2
10	9	(New Zealand) Mitch Evans	Jaguar	36	+6.866	14	1
11	48	(Switzerland) Edoardo Mortara	Mahindra	36	+10.116	19	
12	1	(United Kingdom) Jake Dennis	Andretti-Porsche	36	+11.240	15	
13	51	(Switzerland) Nico Müller	ABT-Mahindra	36	+14.462	17	
14	13	(Portugal) António Félix da Costa	Porsche	36	+17.960	22	
15	21	(Netherlands) Nyck de Vries	Mahindra	36	+19.295	18	
16	17	(France) Norman Nato	Andretti-Porsche	36	+20.235	20	
17	3	(Brazil) Sérgio Sette Câmara	ERT	36	+21.564	9	
18	11	(Brazil) Lucas di Grassi	ABT-Mahindra	36	+25.639	21	
Ret	33	(United Kingdom) Dan Ticktum	ERT	32	Retired	16	
Ret	18	(India) Jehan Daruvala	Maserati	25	Brakes	5	
Ret	8	(United Kingdom) Sam Bird	McLaren-Nissan	22	Suspension	13	
DNS	16	(Switzerland) Sébastien Buemi	Envision-Jaguar		Did not start	11	

- Sébastien Buemi did not start after an accident in qualifying.

Notes:

- ^1 – Pole position.
- ^2 – Fastest lap.

==== Standings after the race ====
Drivers' Championship standings

	Pos	Driver	Points
1	1	(New Zealand) Nick Cassidy	57
1	2	(Germany) Pascal Wehrlein	38
	3	(France) Jean-Éric Vergne	33
	4	(United Kingdom) Jake Dennis	28
	5	(New Zealand) Mitch Evans	21

Teams' Championship standings

	Pos	Team	Points
	1	(United Kingdom) Jaguar	78
1	2	(United States) DS Penske	47
1	3	(Germany) Porsche	38
2	4	(United States) Andretti	37
	5	(United Kingdom) Envision	37

Manufacturers' Trophy standings

	Pos	Manufacturer	Points
1	1	(United Kingdom) Jaguar	103
1	2	(Germany) Porsche	70
	3	(Netherlands) Stellantis	61
	4	(Japan) Nissan	48
	5	(China) ERT	2

- Notes: Only the top five positions are included for all three sets of standings.

== Notes ==
Previous race: 2024 Mexico City ePrix	FIA Formula E World Championship; 2023–24 season	Next race: 2024 São Paulo ePrix (March)
Previous race: 2023 Diriyah ePrix	Diriyah ePrix	Next race: N/A
