= 2024 Mexico City ePrix =

Race 1 of 16 of the 2023–24 Formula E season
Next race →
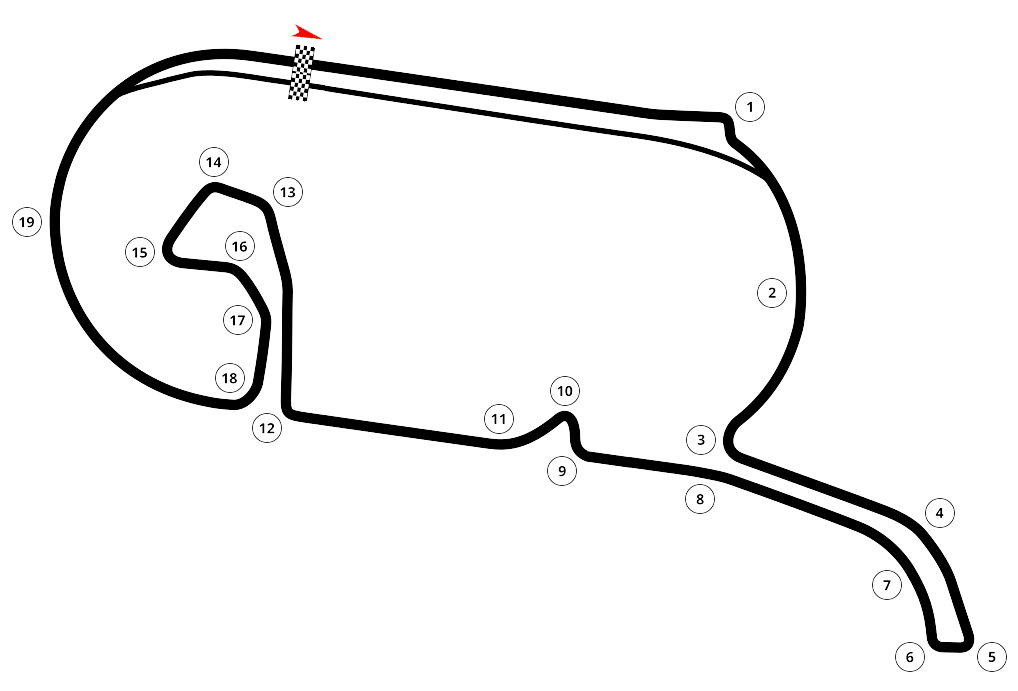

Race details
- Date: 13 January 2024
- Official name: 2024 Hankook Mexico City E-Prix
- Location: Autódromo Hermanos Rodríguez, Mexico City
- Course: Permanent racing facility
- Course length: 2.628 km (1.633 mi)
- Distance: 37 (Note: 35 planned laps and 2 extra laps) laps, 97.236 km (60.420 mi)
- Scheduled distance: 35 laps, 91.980 km (57.154 mi)

Pole position
Driver	(Germany) Pascal Wehrlein	Porsche
- Time: 1:13.298

Fastest lap
Driver	(New Zealand) Nick Cassidy	Jaguar
- Time: 1:14.746 on lap 36

Podium
First	(Germany) Pascal Wehrlein	Porsche
Second	(Switzerland) Sébastien Buemi	Envision-Jaguar
Third	(New Zealand) Nick Cassidy	Jaguar

The 2024 Mexico City ePrix, known for sponsorship reasons as the 2024 Hankook Mexico City E-Prix was a Formula E electric car race held at the Autódromo Hermanos Rodríguez in Mexico City on 13 January 2024. It was the opening round of the 2023–24 Formula E season and the eighth edition of the event.

Pascal Wehrlein won the race from pole, with Sébastien Buemi and Nick Cassidy completing the podium.

== Background ==
The race was the opening round of the 2023–24 Formula E season. There were no regulation changes in place for this event, with the introduction of Attack Charge scheduled for the Misano Adriatico ePrix in April.

== Classification ==
(All times in CST)

=== Qualifying ===
Qualifying took place at 9:40 AM on 13 January.

Group draw
Group A	(Belgium) VAN	(Netherlands) FRI	(United Kingdom) BIR	(Brazil) DIG	(France) NAT	(India) DAR	(France) FEN	(United Kingdom) TIC	(New Zealand) CAS	(Switzerland) MOR	(Germany) WEH
Group B	(United Kingdom) DEN	(Brazil) SET	(United Kingdom) HUG	(Germany) GUE	(New Zealand) EVA	(Portugal) DAC	(Switzerland) BUE	(Netherlands) DEV	(United Kingdom) ROW	(France) JEV	(Switzerland) MUE

==== Qualifying duels ====
Quarter-finals
A3	(New Zealand) Nick Cassidy
A2	(Belgium) Stoffel Vandoorne
A4	(Germany) Pascal Wehrlein
A1	(Netherlands) Robin Frijns
B3	(Switzerland) Sébastien Buemi
B2	(United Kingdom) Jake Hughes
B4	(New Zealand) Mitch Evans
B1	(Germany) Maximilian Günther

Semi-finals
(New Zealand) Nick Cassidy
(Germany) Pascal Wehrlein
(Switzerland) Sébastien Buemi
(New Zealand) Mitch Evans

Final
(Germany) Pascal Wehrlein
(Switzerland) Sébastien Buemi

==== Overall classification ====
Pos.	No.	Driver	Team	A	B	QF	SF	F	Grid
1	94	(Germany) Pascal Wehrlein	Porsche	1:13.877	—N/a	1:13.492	1:13.366	1:13.298	1
2	16	(Switzerland) Sébastien Buemi	Envision-Jaguar	—N/a	1:13.745	1:13.444	1:13.241	1:13.549	2
3	37	(New Zealand) Nick Cassidy	Jaguar	1:13.861	—N/a	1:13.826	1:13.500	—N/a	4 (Note: Cassidy received a one-place grid penalty for failing to follow red flag procedure in Free Practice 1.)
4	9	(New Zealand) Mitch Evans	Jaguar	—N/a	1:13.773	1:13.103	1:13.581	—N/a	5 (Note: Evans received a one-place grid penalty for failing to follow red flag procedure in Free Practice 1.)
5	7	(Germany) Maximilian Günther	Maserati	—N/a	1:13.691	1:13.505	—N/a	—N/a	3
6	5	(United Kingdom) Jake Hughes	McLaren-Nissan	—N/a	1:13.727	1:13.617	—N/a	—N/a	6
7	2	(Belgium) Stoffel Vandoorne	DS	1:13.848	—N/a	1:14.088	—N/a	—N/a	8 (Note: Vandoorne received a one-place grid penalty for failing to follow red flag procedure in Free Practice 1.)
8	4	(Netherlands) Robin Frijns	Envision-Jaguar	1:13.807	—N/a	1:15.836	—N/a	—N/a	7
9	23	(France) Sacha Fenestraz	Nissan	1:13.995	—N/a	—N/a	—N/a	—N/a	9
10	25	(France) Jean-Éric Vergne	DS	—N/a	1:13.821	—N/a	—N/a	—N/a	10
11	8	(United Kingdom) Sam Bird	McLaren-Nissan	1:14.017	—N/a	—N/a	—N/a	—N/a	11
12	51	(Switzerland) Nico Müller	ABT-Mahindra	—N/a	1:13.898	—N/a	—N/a	—N/a	12
13	17	(France) Norman Nato	Andretti-Porsche	1:14.114	—N/a	—N/a	—N/a	—N/a	13
14	1	(United Kingdom) Jake Dennis	Andretti-Porsche	—N/a	1:13.926	—N/a	—N/a	—N/a	14
15	48	(Switzerland) Edoardo Mortara	Mahindra	1:14.341	—N/a	—N/a	—N/a	—N/a	15
16	13	(Portugal) António Félix da Costa	Porsche	—N/a	1:13.982	—N/a	—N/a	—N/a	16
17	18	(India) Jehan Daruvala	Maserati	1:14.469	—N/a	—N/a	—N/a	—N/a	17
18	3	(Brazil) Sérgio Sette Câmara	ERT	—N/a	1:14.012	—N/a	—N/a	—N/a	18
19	11	(Brazil) Lucas di Grassi	ABT-Mahindra	1:15.017	—N/a	—N/a	—N/a	—N/a	19
20	22	(United Kingdom) Oliver Rowland	Nissan	—N/a	1:14.269	—N/a	—N/a	—N/a	20
21	33	(United Kingdom) Dan Ticktum	ERT	1:15.125	—N/a	—N/a	—N/a	—N/a	21
22	21	(Netherlands) Nyck de Vries	Mahindra	—N/a	1:14.585	—N/a	—N/a	—N/a	22

=== Race ===
The race started at 2:03 PM on 13 January.

Pos.	No.	Driver	Team	Laps	Time/Retired	Grid	Points
1	94	(Germany) Pascal Wehrlein	Porsche	37	50:15.506	1	25+3^{1}
2	16	(Switzerland) Sébastien Buemi	Envision-Jaguar	37	+1.162	2	18
3	37	(New Zealand) Nick Cassidy	Jaguar	37	+2.079	4	15+1^{2}
4	7	(Germany) Maximilian Günther	Maserati	37	+5.780	3	12
5	9	(New Zealand) Mitch Evans	Jaguar	37	+13.064	5	10
6	25	(France) Jean-Éric Vergne	DS	37	+13.405	10	8
7	5	(United Kingdom) Jake Hughes	McLaren-Nissan	37	+13.916	6	6
8	2	(Belgium) Stoffel Vandoorne	DS	37	+14.392	8	4
9	1	(United Kingdom) Jake Dennis	Andretti-Porsche	37	+14.767	14	2
10	17	(France) Norman Nato	Andretti-Porsche	37	+15.312	13	1
11	22	(United Kingdom) Oliver Rowland	Nissan	37	+15.485	20	
12	23	(France) Sacha Fenestraz	Nissan	37	+15.718	9	
13	48	(Switzerland) Edoardo Mortara	Mahindra	37	+16.214	15	
14	8	(United Kingdom) Sam Bird	McLaren-Nissan	37	+20.600	11	
15	21	(Netherlands) Nyck de Vries	Mahindra	37	+23.665	22	
16	18	(India) Jehan Daruvala	Maserati	37	+28.969	17	
17	51	(Switzerland) Nico Müller	ABT-Mahindra	37	+29.424	12	
18	33	(United Kingdom) Dan Ticktum	ERT	37	+1:14.758	21	
Ret	4	(Netherlands) Robin Frijns	Envision-Jaguar	7	Accident	7	
Ret	13	(Portugal) António Félix da Costa	Porsche	2	Collision	16	
Ret	11	(Brazil) Lucas di Grassi	ABT-Mahindra	2	Brakes	19	
DNS	3	(Brazil) Sérgio Sette Câmara	ERT	0	Did not start	18	

Notes:

- ^1 – Pole position.
- ^2 – Fastest lap.

==== Standings after the race ====
Drivers' Championship standings

Pos	Driver	Points
1	(Germany) Pascal Wehrlein	28
2	(Switzerland) Sébastien Buemi	18
3	(New Zealand) Nick Cassidy	16
4	(Germany) Maximilian Günther	12
5	(New Zealand) Mitch Evans	10

Teams' Championship standings

Pos	Team	Points
1	(Germany) Porsche	28
2	(United Kingdom) Jaguar	26
3	(United Kingdom) Envision	18
4	(Monaco) Maserati	12
5	(United States) DS Penske	12

Manufacturers' Trophy standings

Pos	Manufacturer	Points
1	(United Kingdom) Jaguar	34
2	(Germany) Porsche	30
3	(Netherlands) Stellantis	20
4	(Japan) Nissan	6
5	(India) Mahindra	0

- Notes: Only the top five positions are included for all three sets of standings.

== Notes ==
Previous race: 2023 London ePrix	FIA Formula E World Championship; 2023–24 season	Next race: 2024 Diriyah ePrix
Previous race: 2023 Mexico City ePrix	Mexico City ePrix	Next race: 2025 Mexico City ePrix
