= 2024 Monaco ePrix =

Race 8 of 16 of the 2023–24 Formula E season
| ← Previous race | Next race → |

Race details
- Date: 27 April 2024
- Location: Circuit de Monaco, Monte Carlo, Monaco
- Course: Street Circuit
- Course length: 3.337 km (2.074 mi)
- Distance: 31 (Note: 29 planned laps and 2 extra laps) laps, 103.447 km (64.279 mi)
- Scheduled distance: 29 laps, 96.773 km (60.132 mi)

Pole position
| Driver | (Germany) Pascal Wehrlein | Porsche |
- Time: 1:29:861

Fastest lap
| Driver | (New Zealand) Nick Cassidy | Jaguar |
- Time: 1:31:561 on lap 31

Podium
| First | (New Zealand) Mitch Evans | Jaguar |
| Second | (New Zealand) Nick Cassidy | Jaguar |
| Third | (Belgium) Stoffel Vandoorne | DS Penske |

The 2024 Monaco ePrix was a Formula E electric car race held at the Circuit de Monaco in Monte Carlo, Monaco on 27 April 2024. It was the 7th edition of the Monaco ePrix and served as the eighth round of the 2023–24 Formula E World Championship.

== Background ==
Pascal Wehrlein entered the weekend in the lead of the championship with 89 points, level with Jake Dennis and 9 points ahead of Oliver Rowland in third.

Jaguar entered the weekend in the lead of the Teams' Championship on 128 points, with a 16-point lead over Andretti Global and a 19-point lead ahead of Porsche. Porsche lead the Manufacturers' Trophy with 190 points, 33 ahead of Jaguar and 36 ahead of Nissan.

=== Driver change ===
McLaren driver Sam Bird crashed during FP1 and suffered a hand injury. As a result, he was replaced by McLaren reserve and development driver Taylor Barnard for the rest of the weekend. This is Barnard's Formula E debut and he became the youngest driver to start a Formula E race at 19 years and 331 days.

== Classification ==
All times are in CEST.

=== Qualifying ===
Qualifying started at 10:40 AM on 27 April 2024.

Group draw
| Group A | (Portugal) DAC | (Netherlands) DEV | (Brazil) DIG | (New Zealand) EVA | (Netherlands) FRI | (Germany) GUE | (Switzerland) MUL | (France) NAT | (United Kingdom) ROW | (Brazil) SET | (Germany) WEH |
| Group B | (United Kingdom) BAR | (Switzerland) BUE | (New Zealand) CAS | (India) DAR | (United Kingdom) DEN | (France) FEN | (United Kingdom) HUG | (France) JEV | (Switzerland) MOR | (United Kingdom) TIC | (Belgium) VAN |

==== Qualifying duels ====
Quarter-finals
A2 | (Germany) Pascal Wehrlein
A3 | (Germany) Maximilian Günther
A1 | (New Zealand) Mitch Evans
A4 | (Portugal) António Félix da Costa
B2 | (New Zealand) Nick Cassidy
B3 | (Switzerland) Sébastien Buemi
B1 | (Belgium) Stoffel Vandoorne
B4 | (France) Jean-Éric Vergne

Semi-finals
(Germany) Pascal Wehrlein
(New Zealand) Mitch Evans
(Belgium) Stoffel Vandoorne
(New Zealand) Nick Cassidy

Final
(Germany) Pascal Wehrlein
(Belgium) Stoffel Vandoorne

==== Overall classification ====
| Pos. | No. | Driver | Team | A | B | QF | SF | F | Grid |
|---|---|---|---|---|---|---|---|---|---|
| 1 | 94 | (Germany) Pascal Wehrlein | Porsche | 1:30.851 | —N/a | 1:29.886 | 1:29.759 | 1:29.861 | 1 |
| 2 | 2 | (Belgium) Stoffel Vandoorne | DS Penske | —N/a | 1:30.593 | 1:30.012 | 1:30.311 | 1:30.304 | 2 |
| 3 | 37 | (New Zealand) Nick Cassidy | Jaguar | —N/a | 1:30.785 | 1:29.800 | 1:30.772 | —N/a | 3 |
| 4 | 9 | (New Zealand) Mitch Evans | Jaguar | 1:30.679 | —N/a | 1:29.725 | —N/a | —N/a | 4 |
| 5 | 25 | (France) Jean-Éric Vergne | DS Penske | —N/a | 1:30.848 | 1:30.119 | —N/a | —N/a | 5 |
| 6 | 16 | (Switzerland) Sébastien Buemi | Envision-Jaguar | —N/a | 1:30.811 | 1:30.140 | —N/a | —N/a | 6 |
| 7 | 13 | (Portugal) António Félix da Costa | Porsche | 1:31.068 | —N/a | 1:30.341 | —N/a | —N/a | 7 |
| 8 | 7 | (Germany) Maximilian Günther | Maserati | 1:31.058 | —N/a | 1:30.425 | —N/a | —N/a | 8 |
| 9 | 4 | (Netherlands) Robin Frijns | Envision-Jaguar | 1:31.070 | —N/a | —N/a | —N/a | —N/a | 9 |
| 10 | 18 | (India) Jehan Daruvala | Maserati | —N/a | 1:31.010 | —N/a | —N/a | —N/a | 10 |
| 11 | 3 | (Brazil) Sérgio Sette Câmara | ERT | 1:31.188 | —N/a | —N/a | —N/a | —N/a | 11 |
| 12 | 48 | (Switzerland) Edoardo Mortara | Mahindra | —N/a | 1:31.042 | —N/a | —N/a | —N/a | 12 |
| 13 | 21 | (Netherlands) Nyck de Vries | Mahindra | 1:31.279 | —N/a | —N/a | —N/a | —N/a | 13 |
| 14 | 23 | (France) Sacha Fenestraz | Nissan | —N/a | 1:31.083 | —N/a | —N/a | —N/a | 14 |
| 15 | 22 | (United Kingdom) Oliver Rowland | Nissan | 1:31.347 | —N/a | —N/a | —N/a | —N/a | 15 |
| 16 | 5 | (United Kingdom) Jake Hughes | McLaren-Nissan | —N/a | 1:31.149 | —N/a | —N/a | —N/a | 16 |
| 17 | 11 | (Brazil) Lucas di Grassi | ABT Cupra-Mahindra | 1:31.349 | —N/a | —N/a | —N/a | —N/a | 17 |
| 18 | 1 | (United Kingdom) Jake Dennis | Andretti-Porsche | —N/a | 1:31.370 | —N/a | —N/a | —N/a | 18 |
| 19 | 17 | (France) Norman Nato | Andretti-Porsche | 1:31.353 | —N/a | —N/a | —N/a | —N/a | 19 |
| 20 | 33 | (United Kingdom) Dan Ticktum | ERT | —N/a | 1:31.600 | —N/a | —N/a | —N/a | 20 |
| 21 | 51 | (Switzerland) Nico Müller | ABT Cupra-Mahindra | 1:31.907 | —N/a | —N/a | —N/a | —N/a | 21 |
| 22 | 8 | (United Kingdom) Taylor Barnard | McLaren-Nissan | —N/a | 1:32.323 | —N/a | —N/a | —N/a | 22 |

=== Race ===
The race started at 3:03 PM on 27 April 2024.

| Pos. | No. | Driver | Team | Laps | Time/Retired | Grid | Points |
|---|---|---|---|---|---|---|---|
| 1 | 9 | (New Zealand) Mitch Evans | Jaguar | 31 | 58:15.455 | 4 | 25 |
| 2 | 37 | (New Zealand) Nick Cassidy | Jaguar | 31 | +0.946 | 3 | 18+1^{2} |
| 3 | 2 | (Belgium) Stoffel Vandoorne | DS Penske | 31 | +3.835 | 2 | 15 |
| 4 | 25 | (France) Jean-Éric Vergne | DS Penske | 31 | +4.799 | 5 | 12 |
| 5 | 94 | (Germany) Pascal Wehrlein | Porsche | 31 | +6.378 | 1 | 10+3^{1} |
| 6 | 22 | (United Kingdom) Oliver Rowland | Nissan | 31 | +6.792 | 15 | 8 |
| 7 | 13 | (Portugal) António Félix da Costa | Porsche | 31 | +7.364 | 7 | 6 |
| 8 | 23 | (France) Sacha Fenestraz | Nissan | 31 | +7.928 | 14 | 4 |
| 9 | 7 | (Germany) Maximilian Günther | Maserati | 31 | +8.262 | 8 | 2 |
| 10 | 17 | (France) Norman Nato | Andretti-Porsche | 31 | +9.045 | 19 | 1 |
| 11 | 11 | (Brazil) Lucas di Grassi | ABT Cupra-Mahindra | 31 | +9.889 | 17 | |
| 12 | 21 | (Netherlands) Nyck de Vries | Mahindra | 31 | +10.183 | 13 | |
| 13 | 33 | (United Kingdom) Dan Ticktum | ERT | 31 | +17.999 | 20 | |
| 14 | 8 | (United Kingdom) Taylor Barnard | McLaren-Nissan | 31 | +18.128 | 22 | |
| 15 | 16 | (Switzerland) Sébastien Buemi | Envision-Jaguar | 31 | +18.452 | 6 | |
| 16 | 5 | (United Kingdom) Jake Hughes | McLaren-Nissan | 31 | +18.996 | 16 | |
| 17 | 4 | (Netherlands) Robin Frijns | Envision-Jaguar | 31 | +19.106 | 9 | |
| 18 | 3 | (Brazil) Sérgio Sette Câmara | ERT | 31 | +24.573 (Note: Sette Câmara was given a 5-second time penalty for causing a collision with Buemi.) | 11 | |
| 19 | 1 | (United Kingdom) Jake Dennis | Andretti-Porsche | 31 | +32.032 | 18 | |
| 20 | 18 | (India) Jehan Daruvala | Maserati | 31 | +1:12.269 (Note: Daruvala was given a 48-second time penalty for failing to activate Attack Mode.) | 10 | |
| Ret | 51 | (Switzerland) Nico Müller | ABT Cupra-Mahindra | 23 | | 21 | |
| Ret | 48 | (Switzerland) Edoardo Mortara | Mahindra | 3 | Accident | 12 | |

Notes:

- ^1 – Pole position.
- ^2 – Fastest lap.

==== Standings after the race ====
Drivers' Championship standings

| | Pos | Driver | Points |
|---|---|---|---|
| | 1 | (Germany) Pascal Wehrlein | 102 |
| 2 | 2 | (New Zealand) Nick Cassidy | 95 |
| 1 | 3 | (United Kingdom) Jake Dennis | 89 |
| 1 | 4 | (United Kingdom) Oliver Rowland | 86 |
| 2 | 5 | (New Zealand) Mitch Evans | 77 |

Teams' Championship standings

| | Pos | Team | Points |
|---|---|---|---|
| | 1 | (United Kingdom) Jaguar | 172 |
| 1 | 2 | (Germany) Porsche | 128 |
| 1 | 3 | (United States) Andretti | 113 |
| | 4 | (Japan) Nissan | 112 |
| | 5 | (United States) DS Penske | 102 |

Manufacturers' Trophy standings

| Pos | Manufacturer | Points |
|---|---|---|
| 1 | (Germany) Porsche | 209 |
| 2 | (United Kingdom) Jaguar | 201 |
| 3 | (Japan) Nissan | 166 |
| 4 | (Netherlands) Stellantis | 155 |
| 5 | (China) ERT | 23 |

- Notes: Only the top five positions are included for all three sets of standings.

== Notes ==
| Previous race: 2024 Misano ePrix | FIA Formula E World Championship; 2023–24 season | Next race: 2024 Berlin ePrix |
| Previous race: 2023 Monaco ePrix | Monaco ePrix | Next race: 2025 Monaco ePrix |
