= 2024 Misano ePrix =

Race 6 of 16 of the 2023–24 Formula E season
← Previous race	Next race →
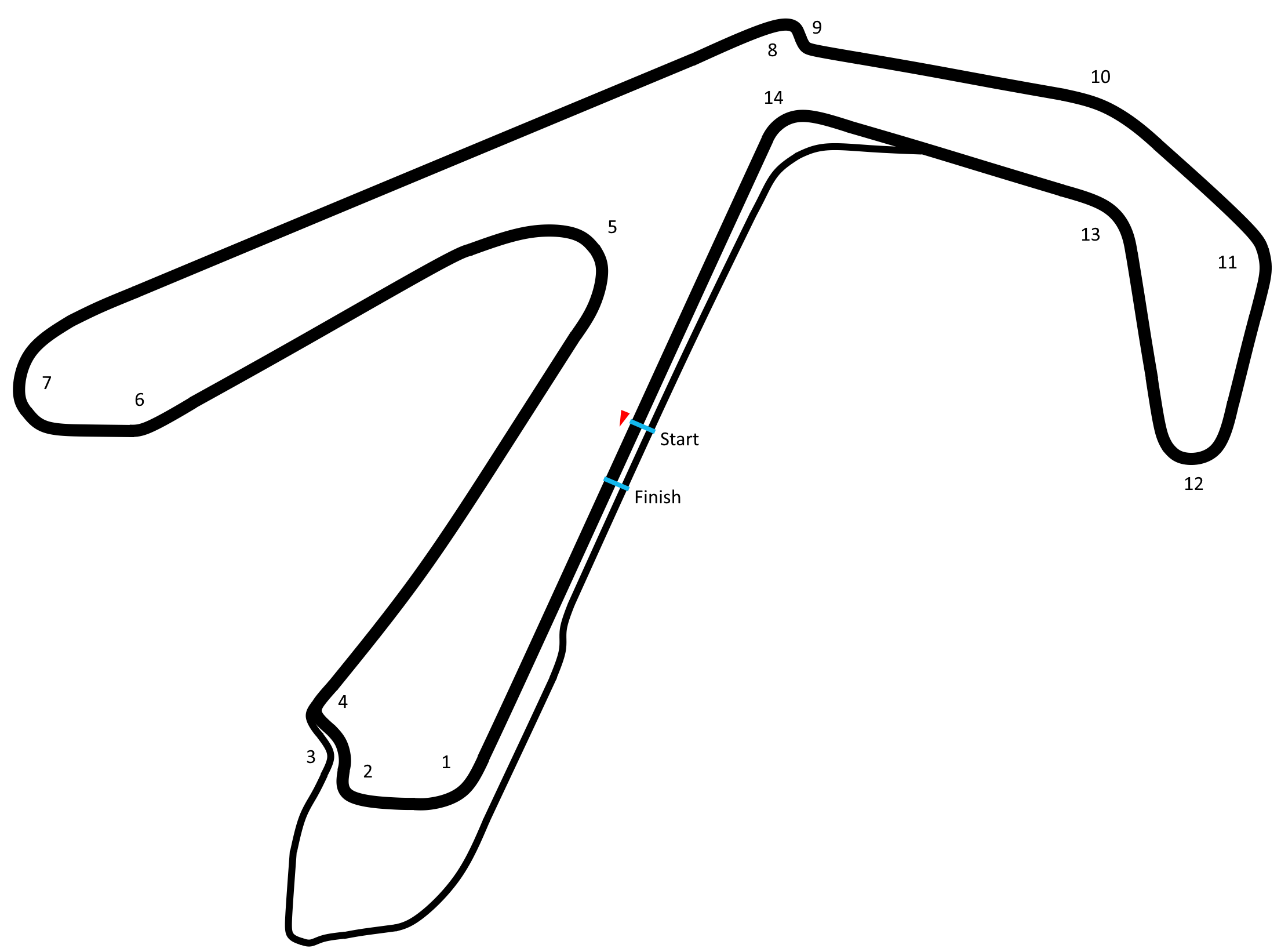

Race details
- Date: 13 April 2024
- Official name: 2024 Misano ePrix
- Location: Misano World Circuit Marco Simoncelli, Misano Adriatico, Italy
- Course: Permanent racing facility
- Course length: 3.381 km (2.101 mi)
- Distance: 28 laps, 94.668 km (58.824 mi)

Pole position
Driver	(New Zealand) Mitch Evans	Jaguar
- Time: 1:17.068

Fastest lap
Driver	(United Kingdom) Oliver Rowland	Nissan
- Time: 1:19.730 on lap 28

Podium
First	(United Kingdom) Oliver Rowland	Nissan
Second	(United Kingdom) Jake Dennis	Andretti-Porsche
Third	(Germany) Maximilian Günther	Maserati

2024 Misano ePrix
Race 7 of 16 of the 2023–24 Formula E season
← Previous race	Next race →
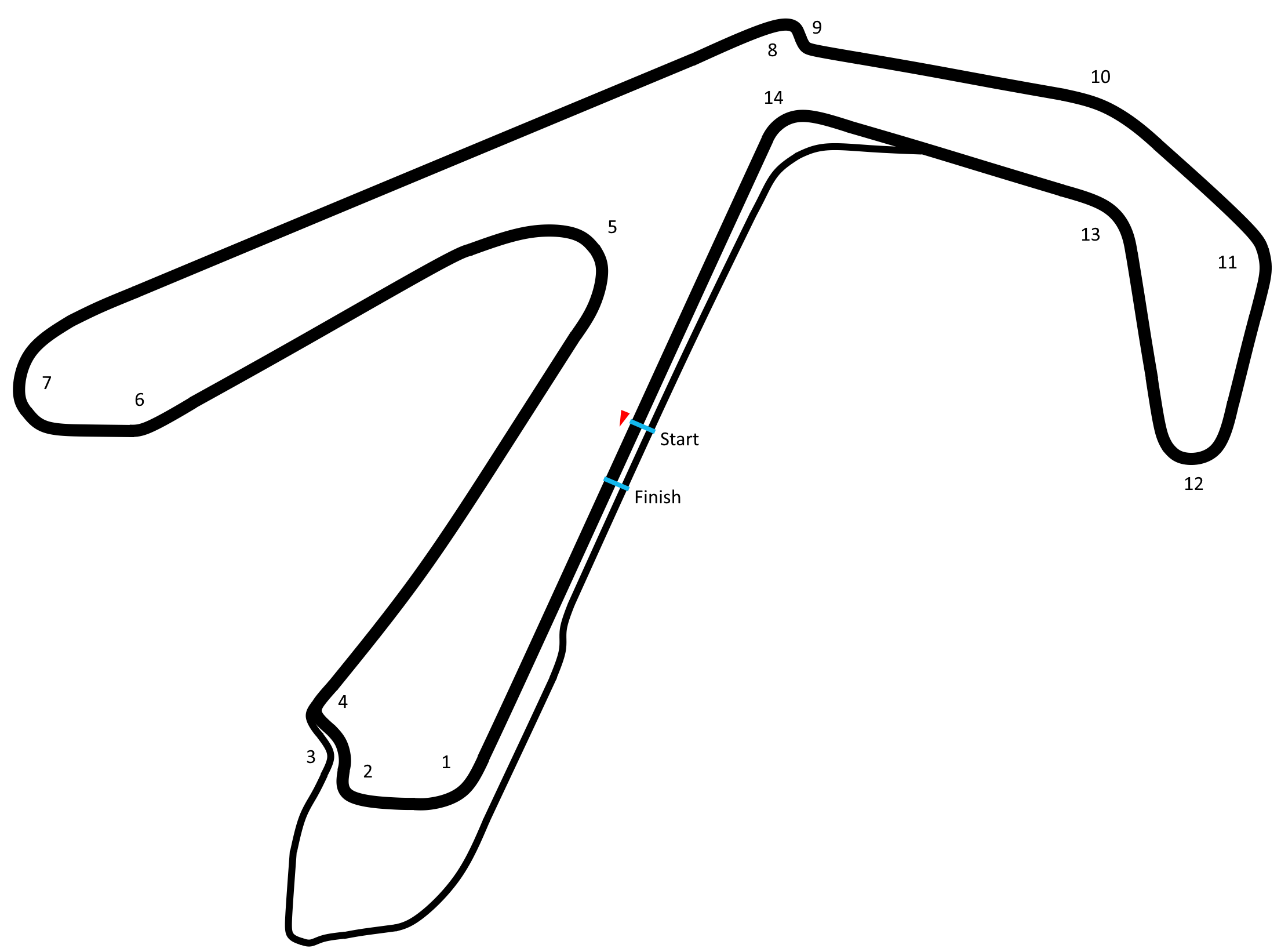

Race details
- Date: 14 April 2024
- Official name: 2024 Misano ePrix
- Location: Misano World Circuit Marco Simoncelli, Misano Adriatico, Italy
- Course: Permanent racing facility
- Course length: 3.381 km (2.101 mi)
- Distance: 26 laps, 87.906 km (54.622 mi)

Pole position
Driver	(United Kingdom) Jake Hughes	McLaren-Nissan
- Time: 1:16.538

Fastest lap
Driver	(Portugal) António Félix da Costa	Porsche
- Time: 1:18.682 on lap 25

Podium
First	(Germany) Pascal Wehrlein	Porsche
Second	(United Kingdom) Jake Dennis	Andretti-Porsche
Third	(New Zealand) Nick Cassidy	Jaguar

The 2024 Misano ePrix was a pair of motor races, the sixth and seventh rounds of the 2023–24 Formula E World Championship, held on 13 and 14 April 2024. It was the first and only running of the Misano ePrix, an event held around the Misano World Circuit Marco Simoncelli, replacing the Rome ePrix on the Formula E calendar.

== Background ==
=== History ===
Formula E has raced in Italy since 2018 with the Rome ePrix taking place at the Circuito Cittadino dell'EUR. However, following a review by experts following a multi-car pile up crash in the 2023 edition, it was decided that a new Italian venue should be found. Multiple other tracks were considered by Formula E, such as Imola Circuit and Vallelunga Circuit.

On 22 November 2023, it was announced that the Misano World Circuit Marco Simoncelli would host the new Italian race in the 2023–24 season, with a double-header weekend.

=== Circuit ===
On 23 February 2024, it was announced that a specific layout would be built and used for the Formula E race, in which the layout will have 3.381 km (2.101 mi) length and 14 turns.

=== Championship standings ===
Pascal Wehrlein enters the ePrix weekend as the leader in the Drivers' Championship with a two point lead over Nick Cassidy, followed by Oliver Rowland (nine points behind) and defending champion Jake Dennis (10 points behind).

Prior to the race, Jaguar hold a 17 point lead over Porsche in the Teams' Championship, with Andretti in third and Nissan in fourth. In the Manufacturers' Trophy, Jaguar hold a seven point lead over Porsche, with Nissan in third.

== Classification ==
All times are in Central European Summer Time (CEST).

=== Race 1 ===
==== Qualifying ====
Qualifying for race 1 took place at 10:20 on 13 April.

Group draw
Group A	(Portugal) DAC	(India) DAR	(Brazil) DIG	(France) FEN	(Netherlands) FRI	(Germany) GUE	(France) JEV	(United Kingdom) ROW	(Brazil) SET	(Belgium) VAN	(Germany) WEH
Group B	(United Kingdom) BIR	(Switzerland) BUE	(New Zealand) CAS	(United Kingdom) DEN	(Netherlands) DEV	(New Zealand) EVA	(United Kingdom) HUG	(Switzerland) MOR	(Switzerland) MUL	(France) NAT	(United Kingdom) TIC

==== Qualifying duels ====
Quarter-finals
A2	(Germany) Pascal Wehrlein
A3	(United Kingdom) Oliver Rowland
A1	(France) Jean-Éric Vergne
A4	(Germany) Maximilian Günther
B2	(New Zealand) Mitch Evans
B3	(United Kingdom) Sam Bird
B1	(United Kingdom) Jake Hughes
B4	(Switzerland) Nico Müller

Semi-finals
(France) Jean-Éric Vergne
(Germany) Pascal Wehrlein
(New Zealand) Mitch Evans
(United Kingdom) Jake Hughes

Final
(New Zealand) Mitch Evans
(France) Jean-Éric Vergne

==== Overall classification ====
Pos.	No.	Driver	Team	A	B	QF	SF	F	Grid
1	9	(New Zealand) Mitch Evans	Jaguar	—N/a	1:18.027	1:17.275	1:17.170	1:17.068	1
2	25	(France) Jean-Éric Vergne	DS Penske	1:18.062	—N/a	1:17.476	1:17.085	1:17.228	2
3	94	(Germany) Pascal Wehrlein	Porsche	1:18.243	—N/a	1:17.549	1:17.143	—N/a	3
4	5	(United Kingdom) Jake Hughes	McLaren-Nissan	—N/a	1:17.864	1:16.977	1:17.425	—N/a	22 (Note: Hughes was disqualified for not arming the fire extinguisher during the qualifying session.)
5	51	(Switzerland) Nico Müller	ABT Cupra-Mahindra	—N/a	1:18.275	1:17.284	—N/a	—N/a	4
6	22	(United Kingdom) Oliver Rowland	Nissan	1:18.332	—N/a	1:17.704	—N/a	—N/a	5
7	8	(United Kingdom) Sam Bird	McLaren-Nissan	—N/a	1:18.133	1:17.731	—N/a	—N/a	6
8	7	(Germany) Maximilian Günther	Maserati	1:18.335	—N/a	1:18.583	—N/a	—N/a	7
9	37	(New Zealand) Nick Cassidy	Jaguar	—N/a	1:18.280	—N/a	—N/a	—N/a	8
10	4	(Netherlands) Robin Frijns	Envision-Jaguar	1:18.360	—N/a	—N/a	—N/a	—N/a	9
11	16	(Switzerland) Sébastien Buemi	Envision-Jaguar	—N/a	1:18.496	—N/a	—N/a	—N/a	10
12	23	(France) Sacha Fenestraz	Nissan	1:18.423	—N/a	—N/a	—N/a	—N/a	11
13	17	(France) Norman Nato	Andretti-Porsche	—N/a	1:18.558	—N/a	—N/a	—N/a	12
14	13	(Portugal) António Félix da Costa	Porsche	1:18.536	—N/a	—N/a	—N/a	—N/a	13
15	48	(Switzerland) Edoardo Mortara	Mahindra	—N/a	1:18.612	—N/a	—N/a	—N/a	14
16	11	(Brazil) Lucas di Grassi	ABT Cupra-Mahindra	1:18.540	—N/a	—N/a	—N/a	—N/a	15
17	33	(United Kingdom) Dan Ticktum	ERT	—N/a	1:18.639	—N/a	—N/a	—N/a	16
18	2	(Belgium) Stoffel Vandoorne	DS Penske	1:18.557	—N/a	—N/a	—N/a	—N/a	17
19	1	(United Kingdom) Jake Dennis	Andretti-Porsche	—N/a	1:18.668	—N/a	—N/a	—N/a	18
20	18	(India) Jehan Daruvala	Maserati	1:18.909	—N/a	—N/a	—N/a	—N/a	19
21	21	(Netherlands) Nyck de Vries	Mahindra	—N/a	1:18.794	—N/a	—N/a	—N/a	20
22	3	(Brazil) Sérgio Sette Câmara	ERT	1:19.143	—N/a	—N/a	—N/a	—N/a	21

==== Race ====
Race 1 started at 15:03 on 13 April, António Félix da Costa crossed the finish line first, driving for Porsche. However, hours after the race, Félix da Costa was disqualified after scrutineers found an ineligible throttle damper setting related to the spring on his car. The victory was thus handed to Nissan's Oliver Rowland.

Pos.	No.	Driver	Team	Laps	Time/Retired	Grid	Points
1	22	(United Kingdom) Oliver Rowland	Nissan	28	40:05.176	5	25+1^{2}
2	1	(United Kingdom) Jake Dennis	Andretti-Porsche	28	+3.003	18	18
3	7	(Germany) Maximilian Günther	Maserati	28	+3.788	7	15
4	33	(United Kingdom) Dan Ticktum	ERT	28	+4.554	16	12
5	9	(New Zealand) Mitch Evans	Jaguar	28	+5.673	1	10+3^{1}
6	25	(France) Jean-Éric Vergne	DS Penske	28	+7.559 (Note: Vergne received a 5-second time penalty for causing a collision with Cassidy.)	2	8
7	17	(France) Norman Nato	Andretti-Porsche	28	+7.588	12	6
8	2	(Belgium) Stoffel Vandoorne	DS Penske	28	+7.639	17	4
9	23	(France) Sacha Fenestraz	Nissan	28	+7.768	11	2
10	11	(Brazil) Lucas di Grassi	ABT Cupra-Mahindra	28	+7.967	15	1
11	51	(Switzerland) Nico Müller	ABT Cupra-Mahindra	28	+8.311	4	
12	16	(Switzerland) Sébastien Buemi	Envision-Jaguar	28	+13.447	10	
13	5	(United Kingdom) Jake Hughes	McLaren-Nissan	28	+13.705	22	
14	21	(Netherlands) Nyck de Vries	Mahindra	28	+18.051	20	
15	3	(Brazil) Sérgio Sette Câmara	ERT	28	+57.526 (Note: Sette Câmara received a 50-second time penalty for overpower use during a thermal battery derate.)	21	
16	94	(Germany) Pascal Wehrlein	Porsche	28	+1:04.968	3	
17	4	(Netherlands) Robin Frijns	Envision-Jaguar	28	+1:18.360	9	
Ret	18	(India) Jehan Daruvala	Maserati	27	Collision	19	
Ret	8	(United Kingdom) Sam Bird	McLaren-Nissan	27	Retired in pits	6	
Ret	37	(New Zealand) Nick Cassidy	Jaguar	27	Collision damage	8	
Ret	48	(Switzerland) Edoardo Mortara	Mahindra	1	Driveshaft	14	
DSQ	13	(Portugal) António Félix da Costa	Porsche	28	Disqualified (Note: Félix da Costa was disqualified after the conclusion of the race for illegal throttle damper spring.)	13	

Notes:

- ^1 – Pole position.
- ^2 – Fastest lap.

==== Standings after the race ====
Drivers' Championship standings

	Pos	Driver	Points
2	1	(United Kingdom) Oliver Rowland	80
2	2	(United Kingdom) Jake Dennis	71
2	3	(Germany) Maximilian Günther	63
3	4	(Germany) Pascal Wehrlein	63
3	5	(New Zealand) Nick Cassidy	61

Teams' Championship standings

	Pos	Team	Points
	1	(United Kingdom) Jaguar	113
1	2	(United States) Andretti	94
1	3	(Japan) Nissan	90
2	4	(Germany) Porsche	83
	5	(United States) DS Penske	69

Manufacturers' Trophy standings

	Pos	Manufacturer	Points
1	1	(Germany) Porsche	146
1	2	(United Kingdom) Jaguar	142
	3	(Japan) Nissan	137
	4	(Netherlands) Stellantis	120
1	5	(China) ERT	15

- Notes: Only the top five positions are included for all three sets of standings.

=== Race 2 ===
==== Qualifying ====
Qualifying for race 2 took place at 10:20 on 14 April.

Group draw
Group A	(New Zealand) CAS	(Portugal) DAC	(Netherlands) DEV	(Brazil) DIG	(Netherlands) FRI	(Germany) GUE	(France) JEV	(Switzerland) MUL	(France) NAT	(United Kingdom) ROW	(United Kingdom) TIC
Group B	(United Kingdom) BIR	(Switzerland) BUE	(India) DAR	(United Kingdom) DEN	(New Zealand) EVA	(France) FEN	(United Kingdom) HUG	(Switzerland) MOR	(Brazil) SET	(Belgium) VAN	(Germany) WEH

==== Qualifying duels ====
Quarter-finals
A2	(Netherlands) Robin Frijns
A3	(Switzerland) Nico Müller
A1	(New Zealand) Nick Cassidy
A4	(France) Jean-Éric Vergne
B2	(Germany) Pascal Wehrlein
B3	(United Kingdom) Sam Bird
B1	(United Kingdom) Jake Hughes
B4	(Belgium) Stoffel Vandoorne

Semi-finals
(France) Jean-Éric Vergne
(Switzerland) Nico Müller
(United Kingdom) Jake Hughes
(Germany) Pascal Wehrlein

Final
(United Kingdom) Jake Hughes
(France) Jean-Éric Vergne

==== Overall classification ====
Pos.	No.	Driver	Team	A	B	QF	SF	F	Grid
1	5	(United Kingdom) Jake Hughes	McLaren-Nissan	—N/a	1:17.610	1:16.413	1:16.817	1:16.538	1
2	25	(France) Jean-Éric Vergne	DS Penske	1:18.020	—N/a	1:16.993	1:16.902	1:16.783	2
3	94	(Germany) Pascal Wehrlein	Porsche	—N/a	1:17.784	1:16.882	1:16.870	—N/a	3
4	51	(Switzerland) Nico Müller	ABT Cupra-Mahindra	1:18.000	—N/a	1:17.032	1:17.931	—N/a	4
5	8	(United Kingdom) Sam Bird	McLaren-Nissan	—N/a	1:17.992	1:16.954	—N/a	—N/a	5
6	2	(Belgium) Stoffel Vandoorne	DS Penske	—N/a	1:18.052	1:17.094	—N/a	—N/a	6
7	4	(Netherlands) Robin Frijns	Envision-Jaguar	1:17.983	—N/a	1:17.738	—N/a	—N/a	7
8	37	(New Zealand) Nick Cassidy	Jaguar	1:17.907	—N/a	—N/a	—N/a	—N/a	8
9	1	(United Kingdom) Jake Dennis	Andretti-Porsche	—N/a	1:18.073	—N/a	—N/a	—N/a	9
10	22	(United Kingdom) Oliver Rowland	Nissan	1:18.064	—N/a	—N/a	—N/a	—N/a	10
11	3	(Brazil) Sérgio Sette Câmara	ERT	—N/a	1:18.091	—N/a	—N/a	—N/a	11
12	7	(Germany) Maximilian Günther	Maserati	1:18.072	—N/a	—N/a	—N/a	—N/a	12
13	23	(France) Sacha Fenestraz	Nissan	—N/a	1:18.126	—N/a	—N/a	—N/a	13
14	11	(Brazil) Lucas di Grassi	ABT Cupra-Mahindra	1:18.083	—N/a	—N/a	—N/a	—N/a	14
15	9	(New Zealand) Mitch Evans	Jaguar	—N/a	1:18.144	—N/a	—N/a	—N/a	15
16	17	(France) Norman Nato	Andretti-Porsche	1:18.107	—N/a	—N/a	—N/a	—N/a	16
17	16	(Switzerland) Sébastien Buemi	Envision-Jaguar	—N/a	1:18.255	—N/a	—N/a	—N/a	17
18	33	(United Kingdom) Dan Ticktum	ERT	1:18.216	—N/a	—N/a	—N/a	—N/a	18
19	48	(Switzerland) Edoardo Mortara	Mahindra	—N/a	1:18.461	—N/a	—N/a	—N/a	19
20	21	(Netherlands) Nyck de Vries	Mahindra	1:18.410	—N/a	—N/a	—N/a	—N/a	20
21	18	(India) Jehan Daruvala	Maserati	—N/a	1:18.720	—N/a	—N/a	—N/a	21
22	13	(Portugal) António Félix da Costa	Porsche	1:18.454	—N/a	—N/a	—N/a	—N/a	22

==== Race ====
Race 2 started at 15:03 on 14 April, and was won by Pascal Wehrlein, driving for Porsche.

Pos.	No.	Driver	Team	Laps	Time/Retired	Grid	Points
1	94	(Germany) Pascal Wehrlein	Porsche	26	37:05.241	3	25+1^{2}
2	1	(United Kingdom) Jake Dennis	Andretti-Porsche	26	+1.933	9	18
3	37	(New Zealand) Nick Cassidy	Jaguar	26	+2.221	8	15
4	51	(Switzerland) Nico Müller	ABT Cupra-Mahindra	26	+2.271	4	12
5	23	(France) Sacha Fenestraz	Nissan	26	+5.230	13	10
6	3	(Brazil) Sérgio Sette Câmara	ERT	26	+5.727	11	8
7	25	(France) Jean-Éric Vergne	DS Penske	26	+6.794	2	6
8	5	(United Kingdom) Jake Hughes	McLaren-Nissan	26	+8.236	1	4+3^{1}
9	18	(India) Jehan Daruvala	Maserati	26	+8.714	21	2
10	8	(United Kingdom) Sam Bird	McLaren-Nissan	26	+11.912	5	1
11	11	(Brazil) Lucas di Grassi	ABT Cupra-Mahindra	26	+12.415 (Note: Di Grassi was given a 5-second time penalty for causing a collision.)	14	
12	7	(Germany) Maximilian Günther	Maserati	26	+13.387 (Note: Günther was given a 5-second time penalty for causing a collision with Vergne.)	12	
13	48	(Switzerland) Edoardo Mortara	Mahindra	26	+14.171	19	
14	33	(United Kingdom) Dan Ticktum	ERT	26	+17.875	18	
15	21	(Netherlands) Nyck de Vries	Mahindra	26	+21.935	20	
16	17	(France) Norman Nato	Andretti-Porsche	26	+1 lap	16	
17	13	(Portugal) António Félix da Costa	Porsche	26	+1 lap	22	
Ret	22	(United Kingdom) Oliver Rowland	Nissan	25	Battery	10	
Ret	9	(New Zealand) Mitch Evans	Jaguar	25	Mechanical	15	
Ret	2	(Belgium) Stoffel Vandoorne	DS Penske	25	Hydraulics	6	
Ret	16	(Switzerland) Sébastien Buemi	Envision-Jaguar	15	Retired in pits	17	
Ret	4	(Netherlands) Robin Frijns	Envision-Jaguar	7	Collision	7	

Notes:

- ^1 – Pole position.
- ^2 – Fastest lap.

==== Standings after the race ====
Drivers' Championship standings

	Pos	Driver	Points
3	1	(Germany) Pascal Wehrlein	89
	2	(United Kingdom) Jake Dennis	89
2	3	(United Kingdom) Oliver Rowland	80
1	4	(New Zealand) Nick Cassidy	76
2	5	(Germany) Maximilian Günther	63

Teams' Championship standings

	Pos	Team	Points
	1	(United Kingdom) Jaguar	128
	2	(United States) Andretti	112
1	3	(Germany) Porsche	109
1	4	(Japan) Nissan	100
	5	(United States) DS Penske	75

Manufacturers' Trophy standings

Pos	Manufacturer	Points
1	(Germany) Porsche	190
2	(United Kingdom) Jaguar	157
3	(Japan) Nissan	154
4	(Netherlands) Stellantis	128
5	(China) ERT	23

- Notes: Only the top five positions are included for all three sets of standings.

== Notes ==
Previous race: 2024 Tokyo ePrix	FIA Formula E World Championship; 2023–24 season	Next race: 2024 Monaco ePrix
Previous race: N/A	Misano ePrix	Next race: N/A
