= Diriyah ePrix =

Formula E race in Diriyah, Saudi Arabia

- Riyadh Street Circuit (2021–2024)
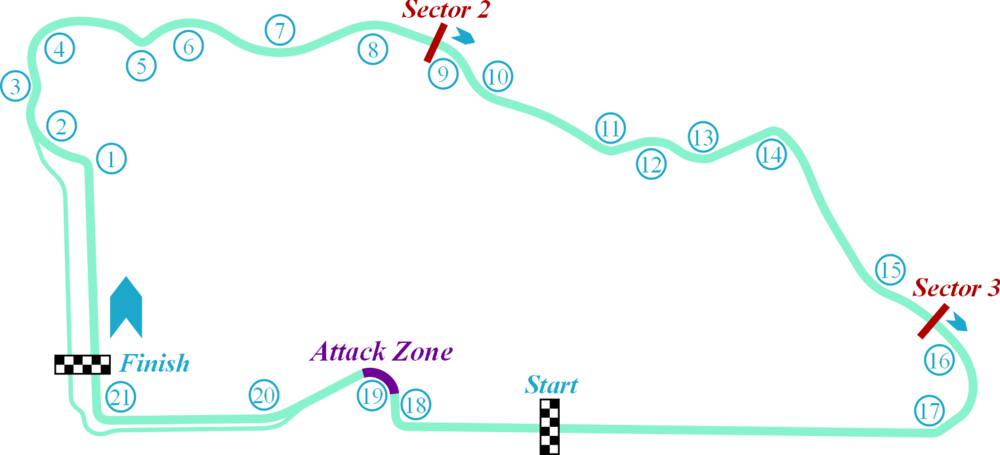

Race information
- Number of times held: 6
- First held: 2018
- Last held: 2024
- Most wins (drivers): (United Kingdom) Sam Bird (2) (Netherlands) Nyck de Vries (2) (Germany) Pascal Wehrlein (2)
- Most wins (constructors): (United States) Andretti (3)
- Circuit length: 2.495 km (1.550 miles)
- Laps: 36/37

Last race (2024 Race 2)

Pole position
- (United Kingdom) Oliver Rowland; Nissan; 1:10.055

Podium
- 1. (New Zealand) Nick Cassidy; Jaguar; 43:51.868; 2. (Netherlands) Robin Frijns; Envision-Jaguar; +1.192; 3. (United Kingdom) Oliver Rowland; Nissan; +1.875

Fastest lap
- (New Zealand) Nick Cassidy; Jaguar; 1:10.606

The Diriyah ePrix was a race of the single-seater, electrically powered Formula E championship, held in Diriyah, Saudi Arabia. It was first held as part of the 2018–19 season and was the first Formula E race to be held in the Middle East. The second Diriyah ePrix was held on 22 and 23 November 2019. The final Diriyah ePrix was held on 26 and 27 January 2024. The final race was won by Nick Cassidy for Jaguar. The Saudi Arabian Formula E round has been moved to the Jeddah Corniche Circuit, becoming the Jeddah ePrix.

== History ==
As a part of Saudi Arabia's long-term plan to hold international sports events, the General Sports Authority along with Saudi Arabian Motor Federation made a ten-year agreement to hold a Formula E ePrix in Saudi Arabia.

The 2018 Saudia Ad Diriyah ePrix was held during the day in December 2018 as the first race of Gen 2 of Formula E and Season 5 of ABB Formula E. BMW’s Antonio Felix Da Costa took pole position and went on to win the race in BMW’s first Formula E Race

In 2019, the Saudia Diriyah ePrix was held as a ‘double-header’ meaning two races were held on the same weekend. Winners from the last Diriyah ePrix BMW i Andretti Autosport took pole position again this time with Alexander Sims but in the race the British driver didn’t manage to convert pole to a win and the race was won by Sam Bird from Envision-Virgin. In the second race Sims took pole again but this time managed to win a lights-to-flag victory on the streets of Diriyah for Andretti.

For the 2021 Diriyah E-Prix the race was held as a ‘night-race’ meaning the race was held after sunset and the track was lined with lights above the circuit. Nyck de Vries took pole in his Mercedes-EQ and in the race he managed to lead every lap to win his first Formula E race. Robin Frijns took pole in the second race but the lead changed eight times and eventually Frijns’ old teammate Sam Bird won the race for Jaguar after the race was ended early due to a crash towards the end of the race.

Formula E returned to Diriyah once again for the 2022 Diriyah E-Prix and in the first race Stoffel Vandoorne qualified on pole in the new qualification system for Season 8. His Mercedes EQ teammate Nyck de Vries climbed up from 3rd place to eventually lead a Mercedes 1-2 in the third Formula E night race. In the second race de Vries qualified on pole but it was Mercedes customer team ROKIT Venturi who won the race.

In 2023, the CORE Diriyah E-Prix was held for the first time as rounds 2 and 3 after the new season and new Gen 3 era had started in Mexico City. Envison’s Sebastien Buemi took pole for the first race but in the race championship leader Jake Dennis climbed up the order to second place from P11 and Pascal Wehrlein from 9th won the race and took Porsche’s second Formula E win. In the second race rookie Jake Hughes took his, and McLaren’s first pole but didn’t manage to keep the lead in the race and eventually Pascal Wehrlein won again becoming the fifth driver to win two races on the same venue on the same weekend and Jake Dennis also finished second again in his Porsche powered Andretti.

In June 2024, it was announced that the race would move from the Riyadh Street Circuit to a new venue for the 2024–25 season. In September 2024, the Jeddah ePrix was confirmed as the replacement.

== Circuit ==
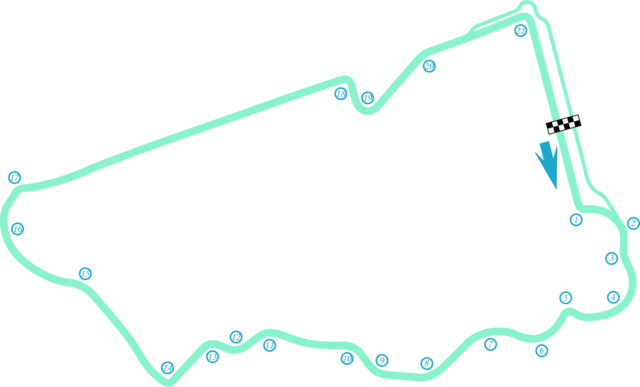
The original layout of Riyadh Street Circuit, in which utilized the same start and finish straight (2018–2019)

The race was held at the Riyadh Street Circuit in Diriyah, a town in Saudi Arabia located on the north-western outskirts of the capital, Riyadh. The track is 2.495 km (1.550 mi) in length and features 21 turns. This configuration was used for the 2018 and 2019 editions of the ePrix, with minor modifications being made for the 2021 edition.

== Results ==
Edition		Track	Winner	Second	Third	Pole position	Fastest lap	Ref
2018		Riyadh Street Circuit	(Portugal) António Félix da Costa	(France) Jean-Éric Vergne	(Belgium) Jérôme d'Ambrosio	(Portugal) António Félix da Costa	(Germany) André Lotterer	
2019	Race 1	Riyadh Street Circuit	(United Kingdom) Sam Bird	(Belgium) Stoffel Vandoorne	(Germany) André Lotterer	(United Kingdom) Alexander Sims	(New Zealand) Mitch Evans	
2019	Race 2	Riyadh Street Circuit	(United Kingdom) Alexander Sims	(Brazil) Lucas di Grassi	(Belgium) Stoffel Vandoorne	(United Kingdom) Alexander Sims	(Portugal) António Félix da Costa	
2021	Race 1	Riyadh Street Circuit	(Netherlands) Nyck de Vries	(Switzerland) Edoardo Mortara	(New Zealand) Mitch Evans	(Netherlands) Nyck de Vries	(Belgium) Stoffel Vandoorne	
2021	Race 2	Riyadh Street Circuit	(United Kingdom) Sam Bird	(Netherlands) Robin Frijns	(Portugal) António Félix da Costa	(Netherlands) Robin Frijns	(Netherlands) Nyck de Vries	
2022	Race 1	Riyadh Street Circuit	(Netherlands) Nyck de Vries	(Belgium) Stoffel Vandoorne	(United Kingdom) Jake Dennis	(Belgium) Stoffel Vandoorne	(New Zealand) Nick Cassidy	
2022	Race 2	Riyadh Street Circuit	(Switzerland) Edoardo Mortara	(Netherlands) Robin Frijns	(Brazil) Lucas Di Grassi	(Netherlands) Nyck de Vries	(United Kingdom) Sam Bird	
2023	Race 1	Riyadh Street Circuit	(Germany) Pascal Wehrlein	(United Kingdom) Jake Dennis	(United Kingdom) Sam Bird	(Switzerland) Sébastien Buemi	(Germany) René Rast	
2023	Race 2	Riyadh Street Circuit	(Germany) Pascal Wehrlein	(United Kingdom) Jake Dennis	(Germany) René Rast	(United Kingdom) Jake Hughes	(United Kingdom) Sam Bird	
2024	Race 1	Riyadh Street Circuit	(United Kingdom) Jake Dennis	(France) Jean-Èric Vergne	(New Zealand) Nick Cassidy	(France) Jean-Èric Vergne	(United Kingdom) Jake Dennis	
2024	Race 2	Riyadh Street Circuit	(New Zealand) Nick Cassidy	(Netherlands) Robin Frijns	(United Kingdom) Oliver Rowland	(United Kingdom) Oliver Rowland	(New Zealand) Nick Cassidy	

=== Repeat winners (drivers) ===
Wins	Driver	Years won
2	(United Kingdom) Sam Bird	2019 (Race 1), 2021 (Race 2)
2	(Netherlands) Nyck De Vries	2021 (Race 1), 2022 (Race 1)
2	(Germany) Pascal Wehrlein	2023 (Race 1), 2023 (Race 2)
