= Mexico City ePrix =

Electric motorsport race

- Autódromo Hermanos Rodríguez (2020, 2022, 2026)

Race information
- Number of times held: 10
- First held: 2016
- Most wins (drivers): 2 (Brazil) Lucas di Grassi (Germany) Pascal Wehrlein
- Most wins (constructors): 3 (Germany) Audi Sport Abt Schaeffler
- Circuit length: 2.606 km (1.619 miles)
- Laps: 36

Last race (2026)

Pole position
- (Switzerland) Sébastien Buemi; Envision; 1:05.249

Podium
- 1. (New Zealand) Nick Cassidy; Citroën; 2. (Switzerland) Edoardo Mortara; Mahindra; 3. (United Kingdom) Oliver Rowland; Nissan

Fastest lap
- (United Kingdom) Jake Dennis; Andretti; 1:07.474

The Mexico City ePrix is an annual race of the single-seater, electrically powered Formula E championship, held in Mexico City, Mexico. It was first raced in the 2015–16 season.

== Circuit ==
The ePrix is held at the Autódromo Hermanos Rodríguez, albeit in a very different form to the version used in Formula One. The layout is just over two kilometers in length, and is based on a modified version of the one-mile short oval used in the NASCAR Mexico Series. It uses the full Peraltada final corner, whereas the exit of the Foro Sol section is next to the entrance. It was slightly altered for the 2017 edition, with the Turn 1 chicane being reprofiled to make for better racing. Track layout modification was done by Agustin Delicado Zomeño.

In 2020 a new section was added after turn 2, including a sweeping right-hander. The back straight had its chicane eliminated, giving drivers a clear run into Foro Sol stadium section.

In 2023 the chicane at the back straight was added again. The chicane was removed again in 2026. Starting from 2027, cars will run the full Formula 1 layout with the same Turn 1 chicane.

== Layout evolution ==
Track layouts
Layout for 2016

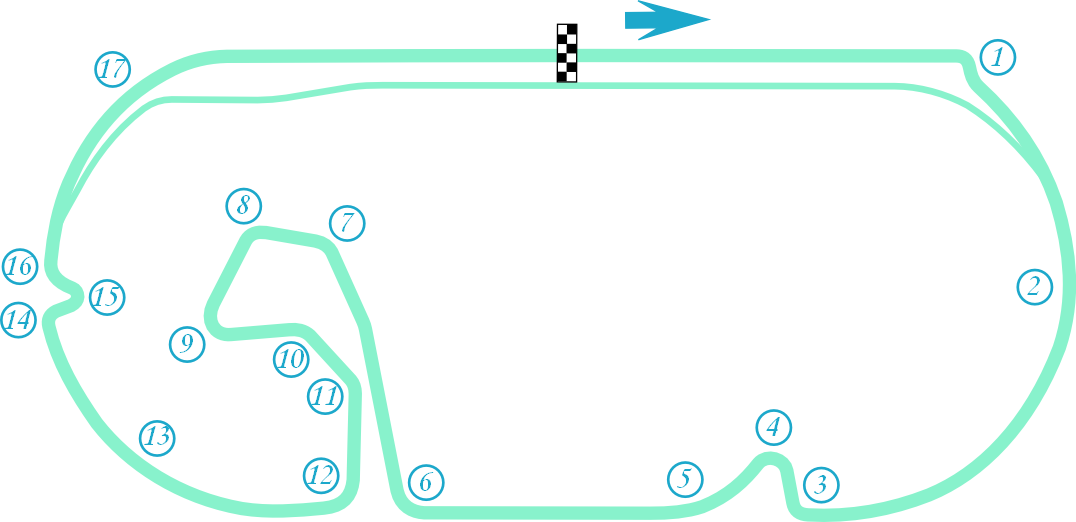
Layout for 2017–2019

Layout for 2020, 2022 and 2026

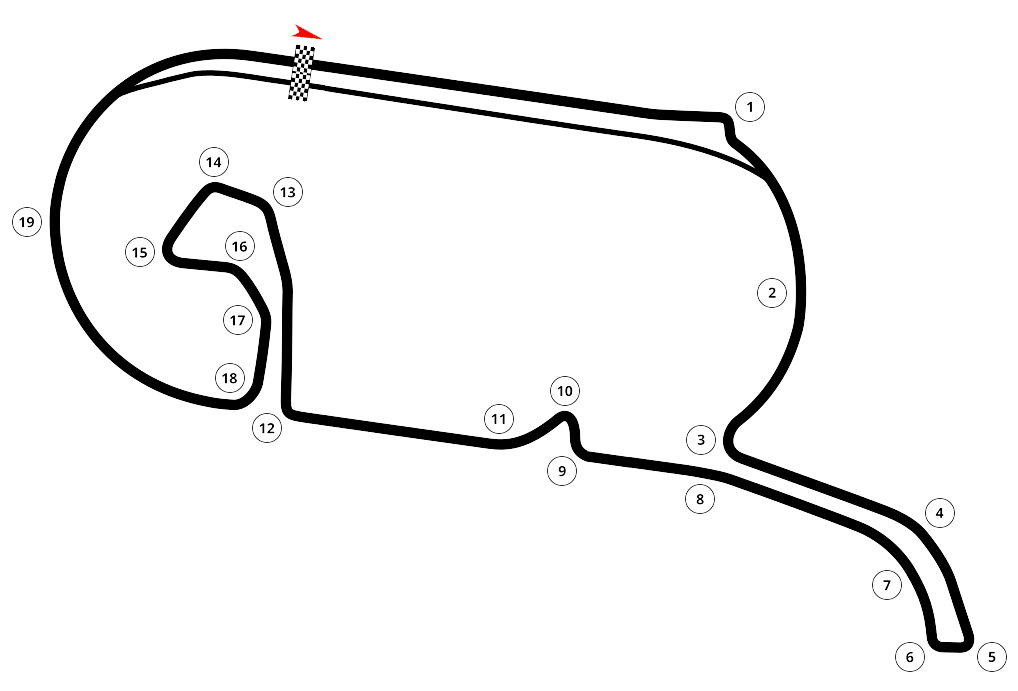
Layout for 2023–2025

== Results ==
Edition	Track	Winner	Second	Third	Pole position	Fastest lap	Ref
2016	Autódromo Hermanos Rodríguez	(Belgium) Jérôme d'Ambrosio; Dragon-Venturi	(Switzerland) Sébastien Buemi e.dams-Renault	(France) Nicolas Prost e.dams-Renault	(Belgium) Jérôme d'Ambrosio; Dragon-Venturi	(France) Nicolas Prost e.dams-Renault	
2017	Autódromo Hermanos Rodríguez	(Brazil) Lucas di Grassi; Audi	(France) Jean-Éric Vergne; Techeetah-Renault	(United Kingdom) Sam Bird; Virgin-DS	(United Kingdom) Oliver Turvey; NextEV NIO	(Switzerland) Sébastien Buemi e.dams-Renault	
2018	Autódromo Hermanos Rodríguez	(Germany) Daniel Abt; Audi	(United Kingdom) Oliver Turvey; NextEV NIO	(Switzerland) Sébastien Buemi e.dams-Renault	(Sweden) Felix Rosenqvist; Mahindra	(Brazil) Lucas di Grassi; Audi	
2019	Autódromo Hermanos Rodríguez	(Brazil) Lucas di Grassi; Audi	(Portugal) António Félix da Costa; Andretti-BMW	(Switzerland) Edoardo Mortara; Venturi	(Germany) Pascal Wehrlein; Mahindra	(Germany) Pascal Wehrlein; Mahindra	
2020	Autódromo Hermanos Rodríguez	(New Zealand) Mitch Evans; Jaguar	(Portugal) António Félix da Costa; Techeetah-DS	(Switzerland) Sébastien Buemi e.dams-Nissan	(Germany) André Lotterer; Porsche	(United Kingdom) Alexander Sims; Andretti-BMW	
2021	Autódromo Hermanos Rodríguez	Cancelled due to the COVID-19 pandemic. Replaced by 2021 Puebla ePrix.					
2022	Autódromo Hermanos Rodríguez	(Germany) Pascal Wehrlein; Porsche	(Germany) André Lotterer; Porsche	(France) Jean-Éric Vergne; Techeetah-DS	(Germany) Pascal Wehrlein; Porsche	(Brazil) Lucas di Grassi; Venturi-Mercedes (Note: Nyck de Vries was awarded the point for fastest lap as di Grassi finished outside the top ten.)	
2023	Autódromo Hermanos Rodríguez	(United Kingdom) Jake Dennis Andretti-Porsche	(Germany) Pascal Wehrlein Porsche	(Brazil) Lucas di Grassi Mahindra	(Brazil) Lucas di Grassi Mahindra	(United Kingdom) Jake Dennis Andretti-Porsche	
2024	Autódromo Hermanos Rodríguez	(Germany) Pascal Wehrlein Porsche	(Switzerland) Sébastien Buemi Envision Racing	(New Zealand) Nick Cassidy Jaguar	(Germany) Pascal Wehrlein Porsche	(New Zealand) Nick Cassidy Jaguar	
2025	Autódromo Hermanos Rodríguez	(United Kingdom) Oliver Rowland Nissan	(Portugal) António Félix da Costa Porsche	(Germany) Pascal Wehrlein Porsche	(Germany) Pascal Wehrlein Porsche	(Switzerland) Sébastien Buemi Envision Racing	
2026	Autódromo Hermanos Rodríguez	(New Zealand) Nick Cassidy Citroën	(Switzerland) Edoardo Mortara Mahindra	(United Kingdom) Oliver Rowland Nissan	(Switzerland) Sébastien Buemi Envision Racing	(United Kingdom) Jake Dennis Andretti-Porsche	

=== Repeat winners (drivers) ===
Wins	Driver	Years won
2	(Brazil) Lucas di Grassi	2017, 2019
2	(Germany) Pascal Wehrlein	2022, 2024

=== Repeat winners (teams) ===
Teams in bold are competing in the Formula E championship in the current season.

Wins	Team	Years won
3	**Abt**	2017, 2018, 2019
2	**Porsche Formula E Team**	2022, 2024
