= List of Formula E drivers =

Formula E, abbreviated to FE, is the highest class of auto racing for electric cars defined by the Fédération Internationale de l'Automobile (FIA), motorsport's world governing body. Each year, the FE World Championship season is held. It consists of a series of races, known as ePrix, held usually held on temporary street circuits within city centers. Drivers are awarded points based on their finishing position in each race, and the driver who accumulates the most points over each championship is crowned that year's Formula E World Drivers' Champion. As of the 2026 London ePrix, there have been 89 Formula E drivers from 23 different nationalities who have raced at least one of the 165 Formula E races since the first such event, the 2014 Beijing ePrix.

Two-time champion Jean-Éric Vergne and Pascal Wehrlein hold the record for the most championships. Mitch Evans holds the record for the most wins with 16. Vergne and Sebastien Buemi both hold the record for most pole positions with 17. Vergne has the most points with 1,299. Lucas di Grassi has the most podiums with 42, he has entered more ePrix than anyone else (165) and also holds the record for the most ePrix starts (164). The United Kingdom is the most represented country, having produced 17 drivers. Seven countries have been represented by just one. Barbados became the latest country to be represented by a driver when Zane Maloney made his Formula E debut at the 2024 São Paulo ePrix (December) driving for the Lola Yamaha ABT Formula E Team. Pepe Martí was the most recent driver to make his debut at the 2025 São Paulo ePrix, driving for Cupra Kiro.

== Drivers ==
Driver entered in the last race (2026 London ePrix) but has not won a series championship
Driver competed in the last race and has won a series championship
Driver has won a series championship but did not compete in the last race

Name	Nationality	Seasons	Championship titles	Entries	Starts	Poles	Wins	Podiums	Fastest Laps	FanBoosts	Points
Daniel Abt	Germany	2014–15 – 2019–20	0	69	69	2	2	10	7	38	390
Jaime Alguersuari	Spain	2014–15	0	9	9	0	0	0	1	0	30
Marco Andretti	United States	2014–15	0	1	1	0	0	0	0	0	0
Paul Aron	Estonia	2023–24	0	2	2	0	0	0	0	N/A	0
Oliver Askew	United States	2021–22	0	16	16	0	0	0	0	0	24
Taylor Barnard	United Kingdom	2023–24 – 2025–26	0	36	36	2	1	6	1	N/A	184
David Beckmann	Germany	2022–23, 2024–25	0	18	18	0	0	0	1	N/A	1
Nathanaël Berthon	France	2015–16	0	3	3	0	0	0	0	0	4
Sam Bird	United Kingdom	2014–15 – 2024–25	0	144	141	6	12	27	12	14	916
Tom Blomqvist	United Kingdom	2017–18, 2019–20 – 2020–21	0	23	23	0	0	0	0	0	11
Matthew Brabham	United States	2014–15	0	2	2	0	0	0	0	0	0
Sébastien Buemi	Switzerland	2014–15 – 2025–26	1; 2015–16	161	160	17	14	36	10	41	1,172
James Calado	United Kingdom	2019–20	0	9	9	0	0	0	0	0	10
Adam Carroll	United Kingdom	2016–17	0	12	12	0	0	0	0	0	5
Nick Cassidy	New Zealand	2020–21 – 2025–26	0	96	96	8	12	30	10	2	786
Michela Cerruti	Italy	2014–15	0	4	4	0	0	0	0	0	0
Karun Chandhok	India	2014–15	0	11	11	0	0	0	0	0	18
Caio Collet	Brazil	2023–24	0	2	2	0	0	0	0	N/A	0
Mike Conway	United Kingdom	2015–16 – 2016–17	0	8	8	0	0	0	0	0	7
Jérôme d'Ambrosio	Belgium	2014–15 – 2019–20	0	69	68	2	3	9	2	3	322
Jehan Daruvala	India	2023–24	0	16	16	0	0	0	1	N/A	8
Jake Dennis	United Kingdom	2020–21 – 2025–26	1; 2022–23	96	96	8	8	27	13	1	825
Nyck de Vries	Netherlands	2019–20 – 2021–22, 2023–24 – 2025–26	1; 2020–21	87	86	3	6	15	5	29	489
Simona de Silvestro	Switzerland	2014–15 – 2015–16	0	12	12	0	0	0	0	0	4
Lucas di Grassi	Brazil	2014–15 – 2025–26	1; 2016–17	165	164	4	14	42	12	53	1,109
Tom Dillmann	France	2016–17 – 2018–19	0	23	23	0	0	0	0	1	24
Felipe Drugovich	Brazil	2024–25 – 2025–26	0	19	19	1	0	1	0	N/A	71
Salvador Durán	Mexico	2014–15 – 2015–16	0	13	12	0	0	0	0	4	13
Loïc Duval	France	2014–15 – 2016–17	0	28	28	0	0	2	2	1	122
Maro Engel	Germany	2016–17 – 2017–18	0	23	23	0	0	0	2	0	47
Joel Eriksson	Sweden	2020–21, 2023–24, 2025–26	0	27	27	0	0	0	1	0	66
Mitch Evans	New Zealand	2016–17 – 2025–26	0	144	143	11	16	38	8	8	1,159
António Félix da Costa	Portugal	2014–15 – 2025–26	1; 2019–20	161	161	8	14	32	5	53	1,040
Sacha Fenestraz	France	2021–22 – 2023–24	0	33	33	1	0	0	0	0	58
Luca Filippi	Italy	2017–18	0	11	11	0	0	0	0	3	1
Alex Fontana	Switzerland	2014–15	0	2	2	0	0	0	0	0	0
Robin Frijns	Netherlands	2015–16 – 2016–17, 2018–19 – 2024–25	0	119	117	2	2	16	5	0	543
Antonio García	Spain	2014–15	0	2	2	0	0	0	0	0	0
Pierre Gasly	France	2016–17	0	2	2	0	0	0	0	0	18
Antonio Giovinazzi	Italy	2021–22	0	15	15	0	0	0	0	6	0
Maximilian Günther	Germany	2018–19 – 2025–26	0	117	116	4	7	12	2	2	443
Esteban Gutiérrez	Mexico	2016–17	0	3	3	0	0	0	0	0	5
Brendon Hartley	New Zealand	2019–20	0	5	5	0	0	0	0	0	2
Nick Heidfeld	Germany	2014–15 – 2017–18	0	44	44	0	0	8	1	8	214
Jake Hughes	United Kingdom	2022–23 – 2024–25	0	48	47	4	0	2	2	N/A	136
Neel Jani	Switzerland	2017–18, 2019–20	0	13	13	0	0	0	0	0	8
Jordan King	United Kingdom	2023–24	0	2	2	0	0	0	0	N/A	0
Kamui Kobayashi	Monaco (Note: Kobayashi is a Japanese driver who was racing under a Monégasque racing license.)	2017–18	0	2	2	0	0	0	0	2	0
Katherine Legge	United Kingdom	2014–15	0	2	2	0	0	0	0	2	0
Fabio Leimer	Switzerland	2014–15	0	2	2	0	0	0	0	0	0
Vitantonio Liuzzi	Italy	2014–15 – 2015–16	0	7	5	0	0	0	0	0	2
José María López	Argentina	2016–17 – 2018–19	0	33	33	0	0	2	1	3	82
André Lotterer	Germany	2017–18 – 2022–23	0	81	81	2	0	8	3	8	363
Alex Lynn	United Kingdom	2016–17 – 2020–21	0	42	42	2	1	3	0	2	121
Ma Qing Hua	China	2015–16 – 2017–18, 2019–20	0	14	14	0	0	0	0	0	0
Zane Maloney	Barbados	2024–25 – 2025–26	0	33	33	0	0	0	0	N/A	3
Pepe Martí	Spain	2025–26	0	17	17	0	0	2	0	N/A	66
Felipe Massa	Brazil	2018–19 – 2019–20	0	24	24	0	0	1	0	4	39
Franck Montagny	France	2014–15	0	2	2	0	0	1	0	0	18
Roberto Merhi	Spain	2022–23	0	7	7	0	0	0	0	N/A	0
Edoardo Mortara	Switzerland	2017–18 – 2025–26	0	129	128	7	6	18	3	7	676
Nico Müller	Switzerland	2019–20 – 2020–21, 2022–23 – 2025–26	0	81	79	1	1	3	2	0	247
Felipe Nasr	Brazil	2018–19	0	3	3	0	0	0	0	0	0
Norman Nato	France	2020–21 – 2025–26	0	80	80	1	1	3	6	0	205
Gary Paffett	United Kingdom	2018–19	0	13	13	0	0	0	0	0	9
Charles Pic	France	2014–15	0	5	5	0	0	0	0	1	16
Nelson Piquet Jr.	Brazil	2014–15 – 2018–19	1; 2014–15	51	51	1	2	5	4	8	237
Nico Prost	France	2014–15 – 2017–18	0	45	45	3	3	5	3	0	304
René Rast	Germany	2015–16, 2019–20 – 2020–21, 2022–23	0	38	38	0	0	3	3	1	146
Felix Rosenqvist	Sweden	2016–17 – 2018–19	0	25	25	6	3	7	3	3	223
Oliver Rowland	United Kingdom	2015–16, 2018–19 – 2025–26	1; 2024–25	114	111	11	8	26	7	1	749
Stéphane Sarrazin	France	2014–15 – 2017–18	0	37	37	1	0	3	0	4	128
Takuma Sato	Japan	2014–15	0	1	1	0	0	0	1	0	2
Bruno Senna	Brazil	2014–15 – 2015–16	0	21	21	0	0	1	1	4	90
Sérgio Sette Câmara	Brazil	2019–20 – 2024–25	0	71	68	0	0	0	0	3	45
Oriol Servià	Spain	2014–15	0	4	4	0	0	0	0	0	16
Alexander Sims	United Kingdom	2018–19 – 2021–22	0	55	55	3	1	3	2	1	174
Scott Speed	United States	2014–15	0	4	4	0	0	1	0	0	18
Dan Ticktum	United Kingdom	2021–22 – 2025–26	0	81	81	3	2	3	4	0	188
Oliver Turvey	United Kingdom	2014–15 – 2021–22	0	90	88	1	0	1	0	4	113
Ho-Pin Tung	China	2014–15	0	3	3	0	0	0	0	0	0
Jarno Trulli	Italy	2014–15 – 2015–16	0	12	11	1	0	0	0	0	15
Kelvin van der Linde	South Africa	2022–23 – 2023–24	0	6	5	0	0	0	0	N/A	0
Stoffel Vandoorne	Belgium	2018–19 – 2024–25	1; 2021–22	103	103	8	4	17	1	56	596
Jean-Éric Vergne	France	2014–15 – 2025–26	2; 2017–18, 2018–19	163	163	17	11	39	7	25	1,299
Jacques Villeneuve	Canada	2015–16	0	3	2	0	0	0	0	0	0
Pascal Wehrlein	Germany	2018–19 – 2025–26	2; 2023–24, 2025–26	113	113	13	11	24	6	4	883
Justin Wilson	United Kingdom	2014–15	0	1	1	0	0	0	0	0	1
Sakon Yamamoto	Japan	2014–15	0	2	2	0	0	0	0	1	0

== By nationality ==
Country	Total Drivers	Champions	Championships	Race Wins	First driver(s)	Most recent/Current driver(s)
Argentina	1	0	0	0	José María López (2016 Hong Kong ePrix)	José María López (2019 New York City ePrix)
Barbados	1	0	0	0	Zane Maloney (2024 São Paulo ePrix (December))	Zane Maloney
Belgium	2	1 (Stoffel Vandoorne)	1 (2021–22)	7 (d'Ambrosio [3], Vandoorne [4])	Jérôme d'Ambrosio (2014 Beijing ePrix)	Stoffel Vandoorne (2025 London ePrix)
Brazil	8	2 (Nelson Piquet Jr., Lucas di Grassi)	2 (2014–15, 2016–17)	16 (di Grassi [14], Piquet Jr. [2])	Lucas di Grassi, Nelson Piquet Jr., Bruno Senna (2014 Beijing ePrix)	Lucas di Grassi, Felipe Drugovich
Canada	1	0	0	0	Jacques Villeneuve (2015 Beijing ePrix)	Jacques Villeneuve (2015 Punta del Este ePrix)
China	2	0	0	0	Ho-Pin Tung (2014 Beijing ePrix)	Ma Qing Hua (2020 Marrakesh ePrix)
Estonia	1	0	0	0	Paul Aron (2024 Berlin ePrix)	Paul Aron (2024 Berlin ePrix)
France	11	1 (Jean-Éric Vergne [x2])	2 (2017–18, 2018–19)	15 (Prost [3], Vergne [11], Nato [1])	Franck Montagny, Charles Pic, Nicolas Prost, Stéphane Sarrazin (2014 Beijing ePrix)	Norman Nato, Jean-Éric Vergne
Germany	8	1 (Pascal Wehrlein [x2])	2 (2023–24, 2025–26)	20 (Abt [2], Gunther [7], Wehrlein [11])	Daniel Abt, Nick Heidfeld (2014 Beijing ePrix)	Maximilian Günther, Pascal Wehrlein
India	2	0	0	0	Karun Chandhok (2014 Beijing ePrix)	Jehan Daruvala (2024 London ePrix)
Italy	5	0	0	0	Michela Cerruti, Jarno Trulli (2014 Beijing ePrix)	Antonio Giovinazzi (2022 Seoul ePrix)
Japan	2	0	0	0	Takuma Sato (2014 Beijing ePrix)	Sakon Yamamoto (2015 London ePrix)
Monaco	1	0	0	0	Kamui Kobayashi (2017 Hong Kong ePrix)	Kamui Kobayashi (2017 Hong Kong ePrix)
Mexico	2	0	0	0	Salvador Durán (2014 Punta del Este ePrix)	Esteban Gutiérrez (2017 Paris ePrix)
Netherlands	2	1 (Nyck de Vries)	1 (2020–21)	8 (Frijns [2], de Vries [6])	Robin Frijns (2015 Beijing ePrix)	Nyck de Vries
New Zealand	3	0	0	27 (Evans [16], Cassidy [11])	Mitch Evans (2016 Hong Kong ePrix)	Nick Cassidy, Mitch Evans
Portugal	1	1 (António Félix da Costa)	1 (2019–20)	14 (da Costa [14])	António Félix da Costa (2014 Putrajaya ePrix)	António Félix da Costa
South Africa	1	0	0	0	Kelvin van der Linde (2023 Diriyah ePrix)	Kelvin van der Linde (2024 Berlin ePrix)
Spain	5	0	0	0	Jaime Alguersuari, Oriol Servià (2014 Beijing ePrix)	Pepe Martí
Sweden	2	0	0	3 (Rosenqvist [3])	Felix Rosenqvist (2016 Hong Kong ePrix)	Joel Eriksson
Switzerland	7	1 (Sébastien Buemi)	1 (2015–16)	21 (Buemi [14], Mortara [6], Müller [1])	Sébastien Buemi (2014 Beijing ePrix)	Sébastien Buemi, Edoardo Mortara, Nico Müller
United Kingdom	17	2 (Jake Dennis, Oliver Rowland)	2 (2022–23, 2024–25)	33 (Bird [12], Rowland [8], Dennis [8], Sims [1], Lynn [1], Ticktum [2], Barnard [1])	Sam Bird, Katherine Legge (2014 Beijing ePrix)	Taylor Barnard, Jake Dennis, Oliver Rowland, Dan Ticktum
United States	4	0	0	0	Matthew Brabham (2014 Putrajaya ePrix)	Oliver Askew (2022 Seoul ePrix)

== See also ==
- List of Formula E driver records
