= Formula E =

Open-wheel electric motorsport series

Formula E World Championship
- Logo in use since 2026
- Category: Single-seater
- Country: International
- Inaugural season: 2014–15
- Drivers: 24
- Teams: 12
- Chassis suppliers: Spark
- Tyre suppliers: Bridgestone
- Drivers' champion: (Germany) Pascal Wehrlein
- Makes' champion: (Germany) Porsche
- Teams' champion: (United Kingdom) Jaguar TCS Racing
- Official website: fiaformulae.com

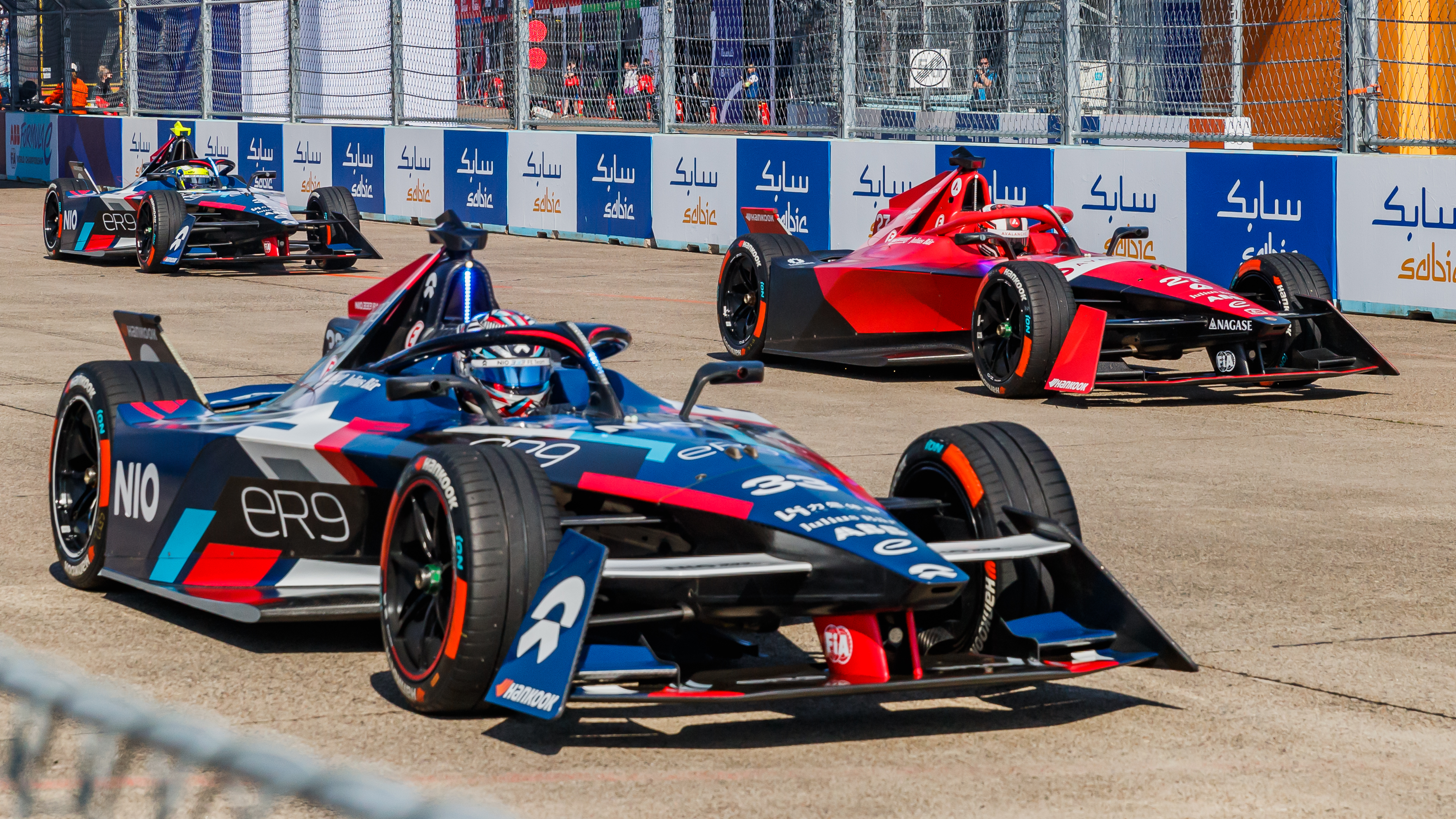
Dan Ticktum, Jake Dennis, and Sérgio Sette Câmara (from front to back) driving at the 2023 Berlin ePrix

Formula E, officially the ABB FIA Formula E World Championship for sponsorship reasons, is the highest class open-wheel single-seater motorsport championship for electric cars. The inaugural championship race was held in Beijing in September 2014. Since 2020, the series has had FIA world championship status.

The ABB FIA Formula E World Championship season consists of a series of races, each known as an ePrix (written as "E-Prix" on the official website). These take place in multiple countries and continents around the world, mostly on street circuits created specifically for Formula E on closed public roads in the centre of major cities, with a small number on purpose-built circuits such as Autódromo Hermanos Rodríguez in Mexico City. A points system is used at each ePrix to determine two annual World Championships: one for the drivers, and one for the teams. Each driver must hold a valid e-Licence issued by the FIA to compete.

Formula E cars are among the fastest racing cars in the world. Major changes made for the 2022–23 season in the development of the Gen3 car were delivered as software updates directly to the advanced operating system built into the car. The estimated top speed is 322 km/h (200 mph). The battery is also designed to be able to handle "flash-charging" delivering up to 600 kW of power, allowing pitstop recharging into the championship for the first time. The wheelbase has been reduced from 3100 mm to 2970 mm and the weight reduced to 760 kg.

Formula E shareholders include Selim Fouad and Warner Bros. Discovery. As of 2024, Formula E's founder and Spanish businessman Alejandro Agag is the company's Chairman, and the Chief Executive Officer is Jeff Dodds.

== History ==
The proposal for a city-based, single-seater electric car motor racing championship was conceived by Jean Todt, the president of the world governing body of motorsport, the Fédération Internationale de l'Automobile (FIA), and presented to politicians Alejandro Agag and Antonio Tajani at a dinner at a small Italian restaurant in the French capital Paris on 3 March 2011. Tajani was concentrated on the electrification of the automobile industry, reducing carbon-dioxide emissions and introducing hybrid and electric systems. Agag supported Todt's proposal after the latter discussed the FIA opening up a tender to organise the series. Agag told Todt that he would take on the task because of his prior experience in negotiating contracts with television stations, sponsorship and marketing.

Since the 2020–21 season, Formula E is a FIA World Championship, making it the first single-seater racing series outside of Formula One to be given world championship status.

== Regulations ==
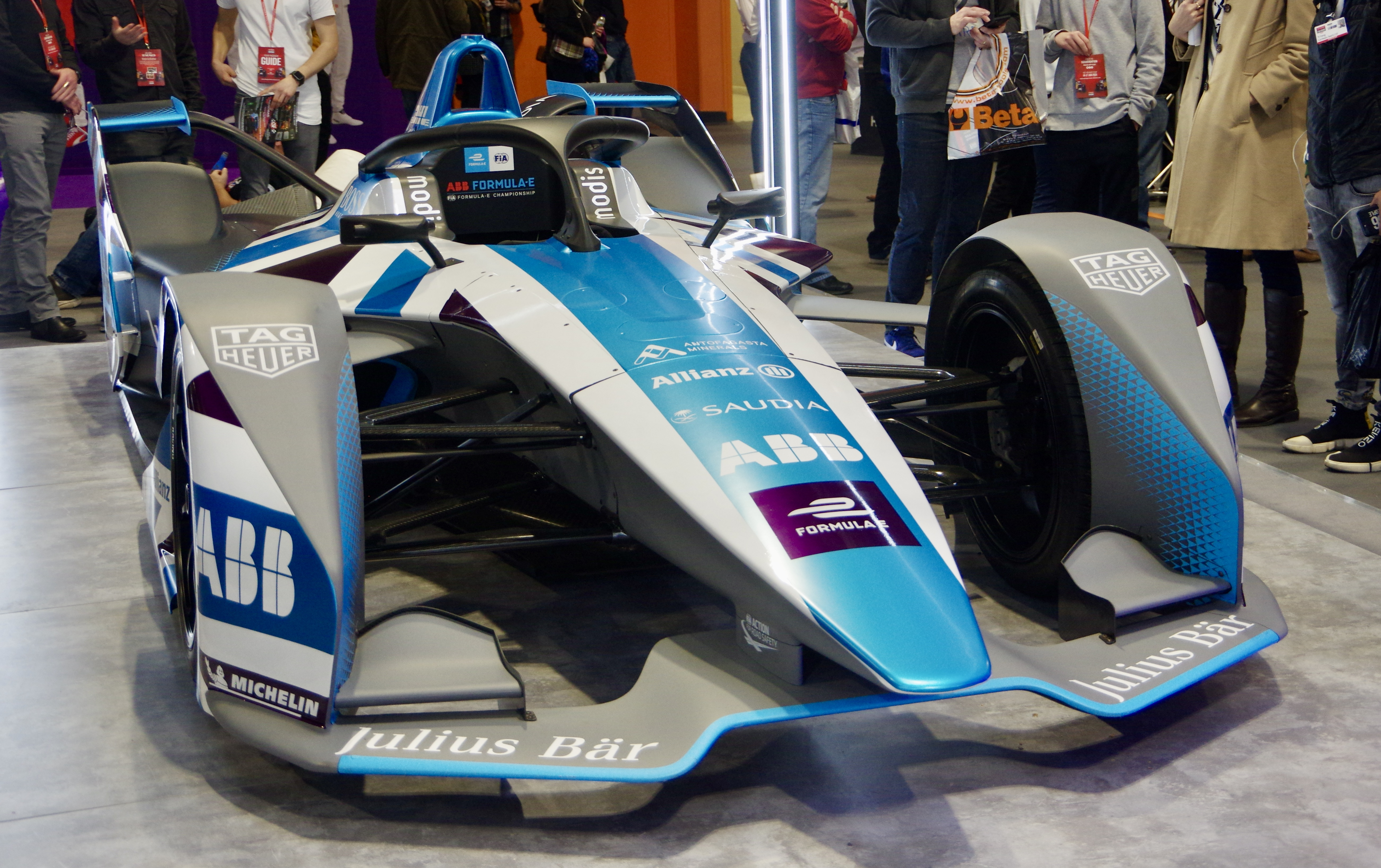
The Spark SRT05e demo car at the 2020 Autosport International

The Formula E championship is currently contested by 20 drivers, and 10 teams as of the 2026 season. The sport features electric-powered race cars similar in style to the hybrid-drive cars of Formula One. Racing generally takes place on temporary city-centre street circuits, that are around 1.9 to 3.4 km (1.2 to 2.1 mi) long, although the series is slowly moving towards racing on more traditional circuits, such as Shanghai International Circuit, and the Circuito del Jarama.

=== Practice ===
All practice sessions in Formula E are usually 40 minutes long, with the first practice session generally taking place on Friday afternoon, while the second takes place on Saturday morning (both sessions are held on Saturday morning and last for only 30 minutes in Monaco). During these sessions, the drivers are free to use the full qualifying power output (currently 350 kW (475 bhp)). An additional practice session takes place on Sunday morning in "doubleheader" weekends, where the series runs two races on the same track on back to back days.

=== Qualifying ===
The qualifying session typically takes place later in the day and lasts approximately one hour. Under the current format (introduced in season 8), the drivers are split into two groups based on their position in the championship; those in odd-numbered places go into group A, while those in even-numbered places go into group B. The exception is in the first race of the season, where each team can nominate one driver into each group. Each group gets a 10-minute session to set a fastest lap at 300 kW, of which the top 4 of each group will advance to the "duels" stage, where drivers face off head-to-head at 350 kW over a quarter-final, semi-final and final. The winner of the final then lines up in position 1, the loser of the final in position 2, the losers of the semi-final in positions 3 and 4, and the losers of the quarter-final in positions 5 through 8, in order of time set in their respective sessions. The rest of the drivers from the group stage are placed alternately from position 9, with the polesitter's group in the odd places, and the other group in the even places.

=== Race format ===
Formula E, like most other major motorsport series, currently has races that have a certain lap distance set. Also, for every four minutes that are spent under full course yellow or the safety car, an additional lap of racing is added to the race length.

A brand new feature called 'Pit Boost' was introduced during Season 11, where the drivers have to return to the pits to undertake a mandatory 30 second pit stop that can recharge the batteries and in addition, add 3.85 kWh of energy to them. During the race, the maximum power output of the race cars is currently restricted to 300 kW (402 bhp).

Since all-weather tyres are designed to last for a whole race, pit stops are only required to change a punctured tyre or perform repairs on the car.

==== History of race formats ====
From Season 1–4, Formula E had a lap distance set, with pit-stops to swap cars halfway through as the batteries lacked the capacity to last the whole race. However, from Season 5, the race was set to 45 minutes plus one lap, as the introduction of the Gen2 car that year saw the batteries in the cars lasting to the end of the race, ending the necessary pitstops. With the introduction of the Gen3 Car in Season 9 Formula E reverted to the lap format.

For season 6 and 7, for each minute spent under safety car or FCY, 1 kW⋅h of energy was removed from the total usable energy, giving drivers and teams more energy management tactics. In Season 8, a newly introduced 'added time' format was used, where every full minute under a safety car or full course yellow within the first 40 minutes, 45 seconds was added to the race time up to a maximum of 10 minutes, before the 'added lap' format that is currently used replaced the 'added time' format in Season 9.

==== Track formats ====
Formula E started out in 2014–15 as holding races solely on street circuits, many of them built as temporary circuits (e.g. Tempelhof Airport Street Circuit). The first race on a dedicated racetrack was held at Autódromo Hermanos Rodríguez in Mexico in the 2016–17 season, albeit in a heavily shortened track setup compared to the one used in Formula One's Mexican Grand Prix.

In the 2020–21 season, the Puebla ePrix and Valencia ePrix were held on configurations comparable to their full-length configurations, being 381 m (by skipping the International Road Course' leftmost corners) and 629 m (by skipping turns 9 through 12 of the Grand Prix Circuit) shorter respectively.

The first-ever Formula E race held on a full-length racetrack configuration of a circuit designed for other racing leagues, or in fact a longer one than the main configuration, was the 2023 Portland ePrix at the Portland International Raceway.

In the 2019–20 season, Tempelhof hosted the first race held on a reverse configuration of a track's main layout in Formula E (previous examples in other racing leagues included IndyCar's Museum Park in Miami in 1995, and Circuit Zandvoort in the 1958 Tulip Rally).

=== Point scoring ===
Points are awarded to the top ten drivers using the standard FIA system (25–18–15–12–10–8–6–4–2–1). The driver securing the pole position is also awarded 3 points, while the driver setting the fastest lap (if they finish in the top ten) additionally receives 1 point (2 points during the first two seasons). In addition, for season six and seven (2019–21) the driver achieving the fastest lap during group qualifying was awarded 1 point. The championship consists of both a drivers' and teams' championship. A driver's end of season total is made up of a driver's best results. A team's total is made up by counting both drivers' scores throughout the season.

=== Fanboost ===
For Formula E's first eight seasons (2014–22), fans could vote for their favorite driver via the official website or app to potentially provide teams with an extra power boost which can be activated by pushing an overtake button. Voting started three days before the event and closed after the opening 15 minutes of the race. The five drivers that got the most votes each received an extra power burst that could be used in a 5-second window during the second half of the race. Since the 2023 season, Fanboost was discontinued.

=== Attack Mode ===
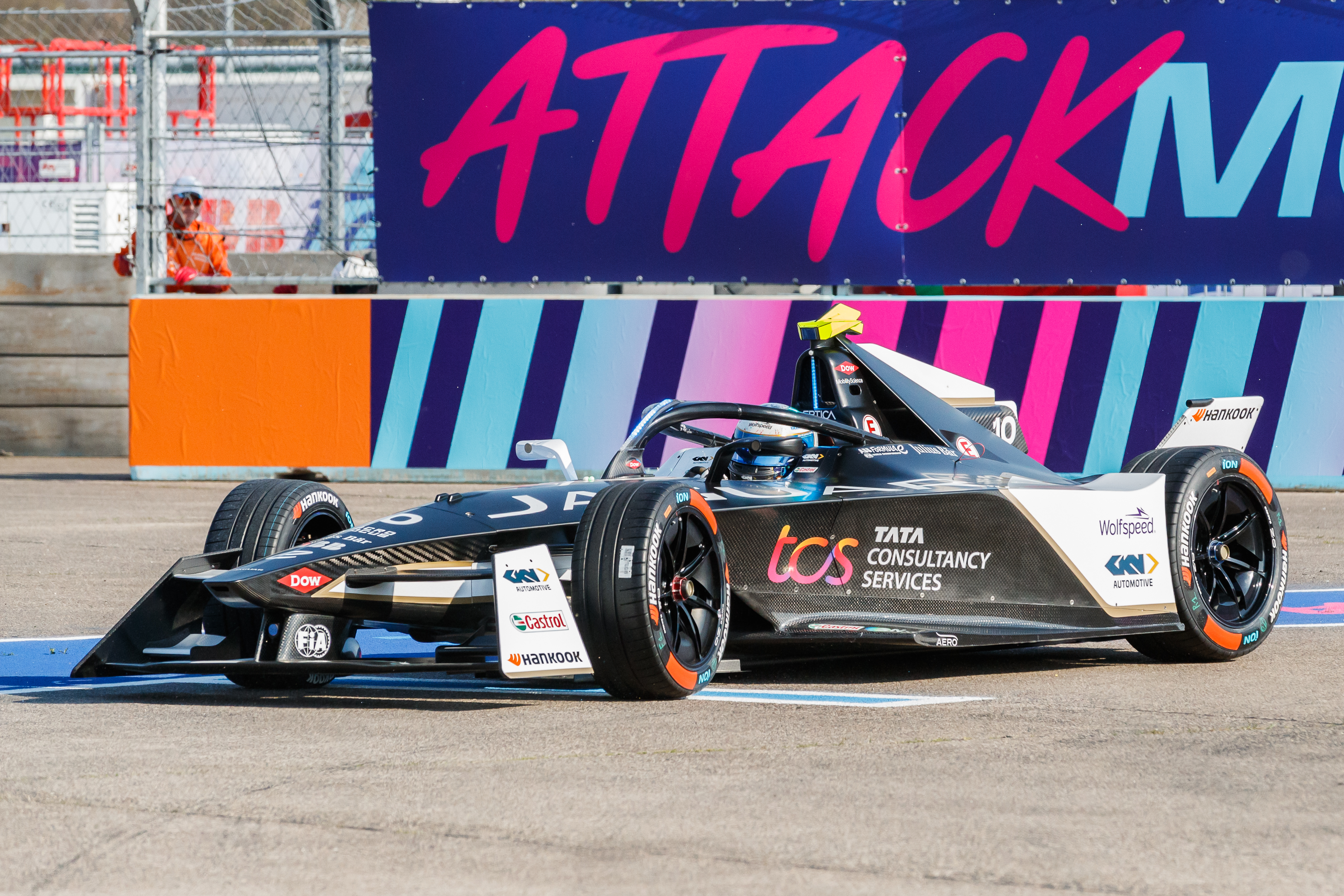
Attack Mode area of a track.

With the fifth season, a feature called Attack Mode was introduced, in which drivers received an additional 25 kW in season 5 (35 kW in season 6 and 7) of power after driving through a designated area of the circuit off the racing line. The duration of the boost mode and the number of boosts available are decided only shortly before each race by the FIA to reduce the time the teams have to find the optimal strategy. All attack modes must be activated at the end of the race, but do not need to be used up (i.e. if a final attack mode is activated in the penultimate lap, the driver is not penalized for having it still activated at the end of the race). If there is a full course yellow period or a safety car, attack mode is not allowed to be activated.

The Attack Mode format was changed up for Season 9, as instead of a constantly changing number of times the drivers had to drive through the activation zone during the race, and also the changing amount of time that each Attack Mode period lasted, the drivers would now get a combined 4 minutes of Attack Mode to use, that would be used in 2 activation periods throughout the race. During the first activation period, drivers would have to choose their Attack Mode activation time 'strategy', where they could either pick from having 2 2-minute attack mode periods, a 1-minute to start and then a 3-minute period, or vice versa. From the 2023 Jakarta ePrix, it was lengthened to a combined 8 minutes that could be deployed in 2 minutes and then 6 minutes or vice versa or 2 4-minute periods.

=== Pit Boost ===
In Season 9, a new feature known as Attack Charge was planned to be introduced in a few races later in the season, however, due to a requirement needed to solve issues with the Gen3 car's new batteries, the production of the fast chargers was delayed. And as a result after criticisms from the teams about shifting to a new race format midway through the season, the debut of Attack Charge was pushed back.

After more than two years after the initial announcement of the feature, now known as Pit Boost, made its debut at the 2025 Jeddah ePrix. In e-Prix races where Pit Boost is included, all drivers are required to do a mandatory 30-second stop to recharge the car's batteries at 600 kW, and provide an extra 3.85 kWh of energy (around 10% additional energy) to use throughout the rest of the race. This pitstop will have to be taken in a certain window in the race, chosen by the race officials prior to the event. No other work on the cars is allowed to be carried out during the quick-charging pitstops, and only one car per team is allowed to take the stop at a time.

== Cars ==
=== Spark-Renault SRT_01E ("Gen1 Car") ===
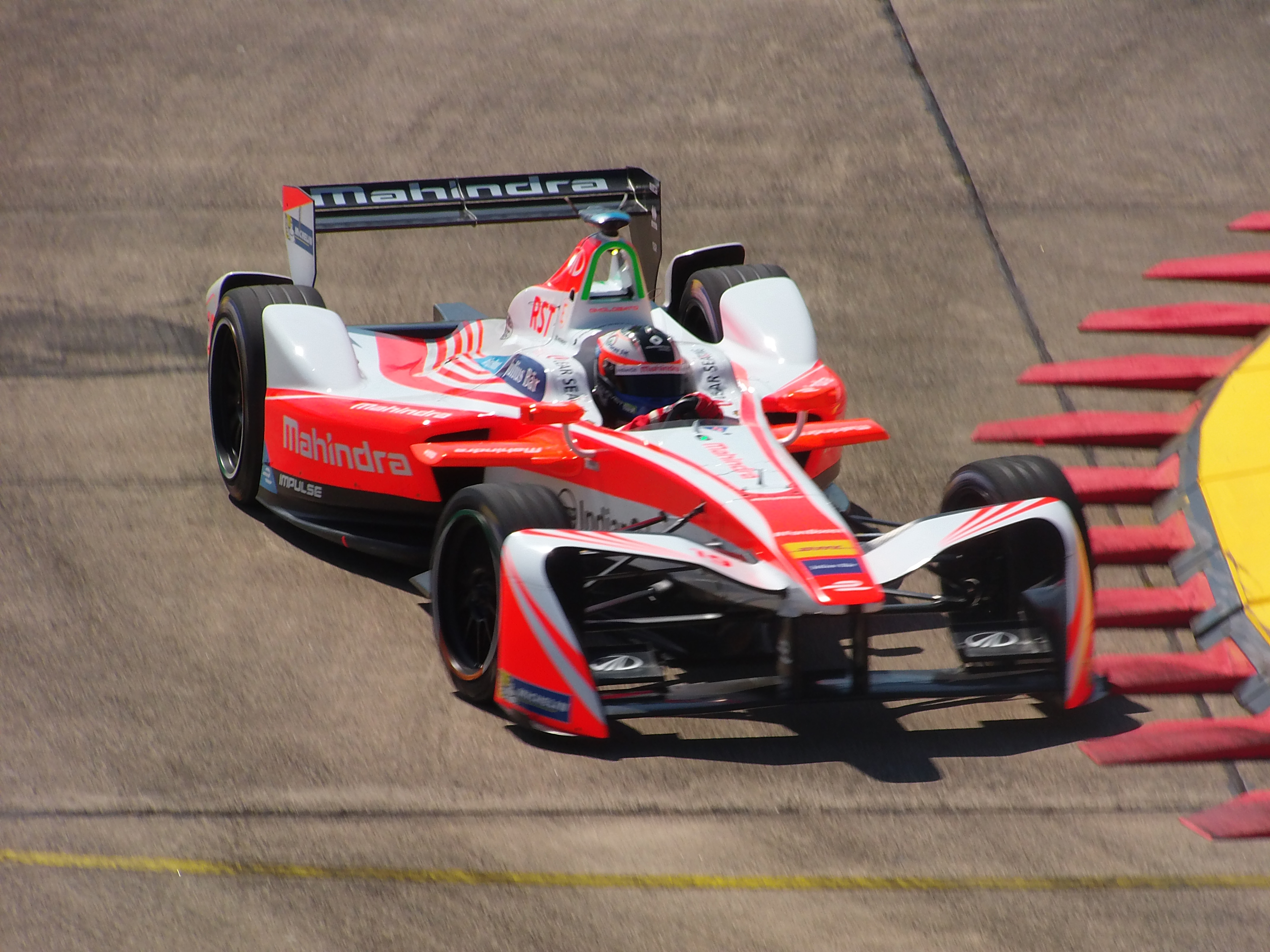
Felix Rosenqvist at the 2017 Berlin ePrix, showing the updated season-3 spec front wing

For the first four seasons, an electric racing car built by Spark Racing Technology, called the Spark-Renault SRT 01E, was used. The chassis was designed by Dallara, a battery system was created by Williams Advanced Engineering and a Hewland five-speed gearbox was used. Michelin was the official tyre supplier. For the first season, 42 electric cars were ordered by the series. 4 cars were made available to each of the 10 teams and 2 cars were kept for testing purposes.

This first Formula E car had a peak power of 335 horsepower (250 kW). The car was able to accelerate from 0 to 100 km/h (0 to 62 mph) in 3 seconds, with a maximum speed of 225 km/h (140 mph). The generators used to re-charge the batteries are powered by glycerine, a byproduct of biodiesel production.

In the first season, all teams used an electric motor developed by McLaren (the same as that used in its P1 supercar). But since the second season, powertrain manufacturers could build their own electric motor, inverter, gearbox and cooling system while using the same spec chassis and battery. There were nine manufacturers creating powertrains for the 2016–17 season: ABT Schaeffler, Andretti Technologies, DS-Virgin, Jaguar, Mahindra, NextEV TCR, Penske, Renault, and Venturi.

For Season 1, peak power output was 268 horsepower (200 kW) and limited to 201 horsepower (150 kW) in race conditions, which was increased to 228 horsepower (170 kW) for Season 2. In Season 3, the battery pack was upgraded which allowed the peak power to increase to 335 horsepower (250 kW) and the peak regeneration rate to increase by 50 kW to 150 kW, while overall pack weight was reduced by 8 kilograms (18 lb) despite the weight of the battery cells increasing by 30 kg to 230 kg (507 lb). Additionally, the Michelin tyres were updated to reduce rolling resistance and weight while also improving tyre warmup time, and the front wing was updated to improve both aesthetics and durability. For Season 4, the race power limit was raised again to 241 horsepower (180 kW).

=== Spark SRT05e ("Gen2 car") ===
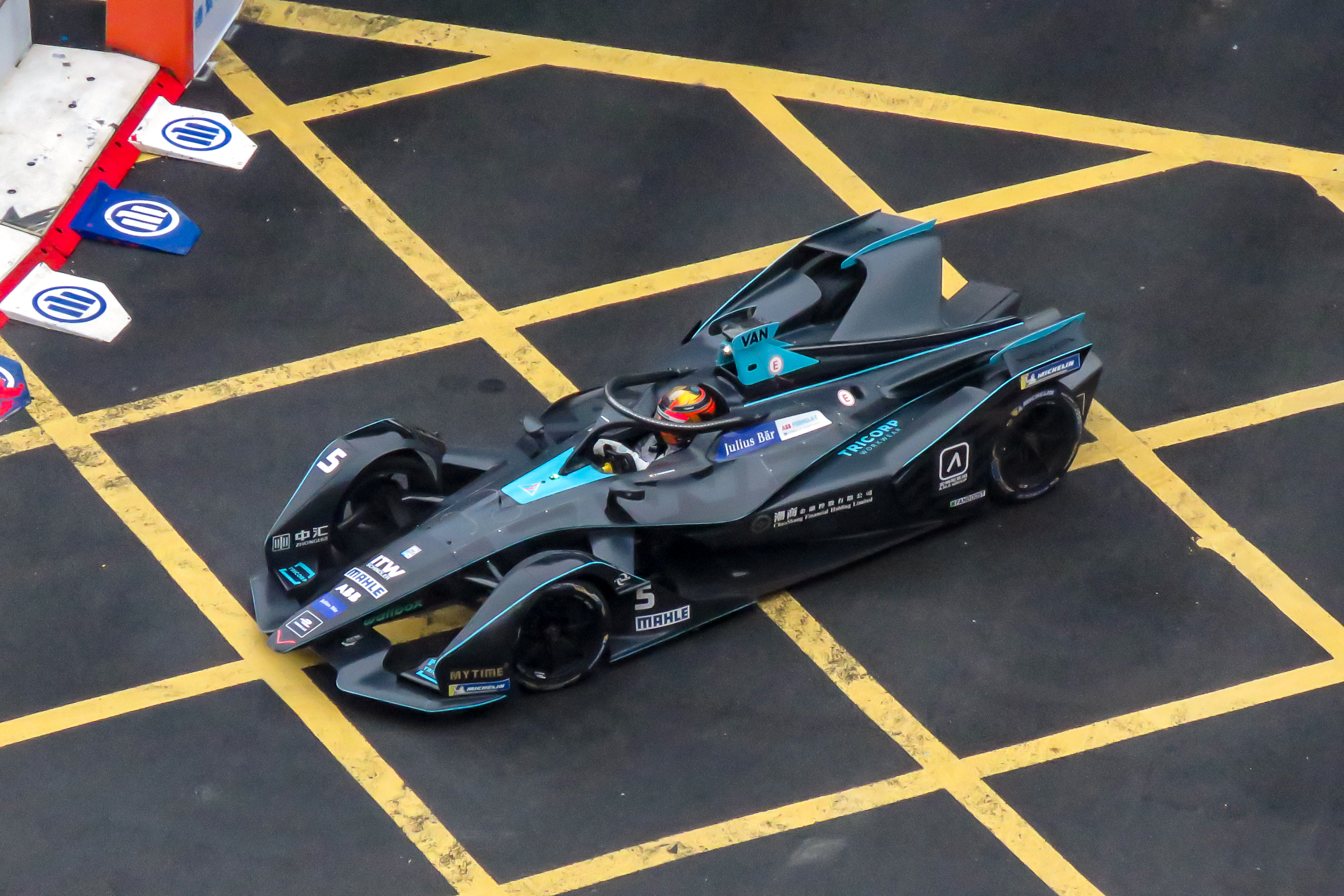
Stoffel Vandoorne driving a Gen2 Formula E car at the 2019 Hong Kong ePrix

The second-generation ("Gen2") Formula E car was introduced in the 2018–19 season (Season 5) and featured significant technological advances over the previous Spark-Renault SRT 01E car – its 54 kWh battery and peak power output rising from 268 to 335 horsepower (200 to 250 kW) and top speed rising to around 280 km/h (174 mph). The arrival of the Gen2 car also saw an end to the series' mid-race car-swaps, as the new battery produced by McLaren Applied Technologies and Atieva have roughly double the capacity. They were equipped with Brembo braking systems, chosen by Spark Racing Technology as the sole supplier. The cars were also equipped with the halo, a T-shaped safety cage designed to protect the driver's head in crashes and by deflecting flying objects. Michelin remained as tyre manufacturer, supplying all-weather treaded tyres.

Base race power was 268 horsepower (200 kW), which rose to 295 horsepower (220 kW) for the Season 8. The newly introduced Attack Mode was initially set to 302 horsepower (225 kW), which rose to 315 horsepower (235 kW) for Season 6 and 335 horsepower (250 kW) for Season 8.

=== Gen3 car (2022–23 to 2025–26) ===
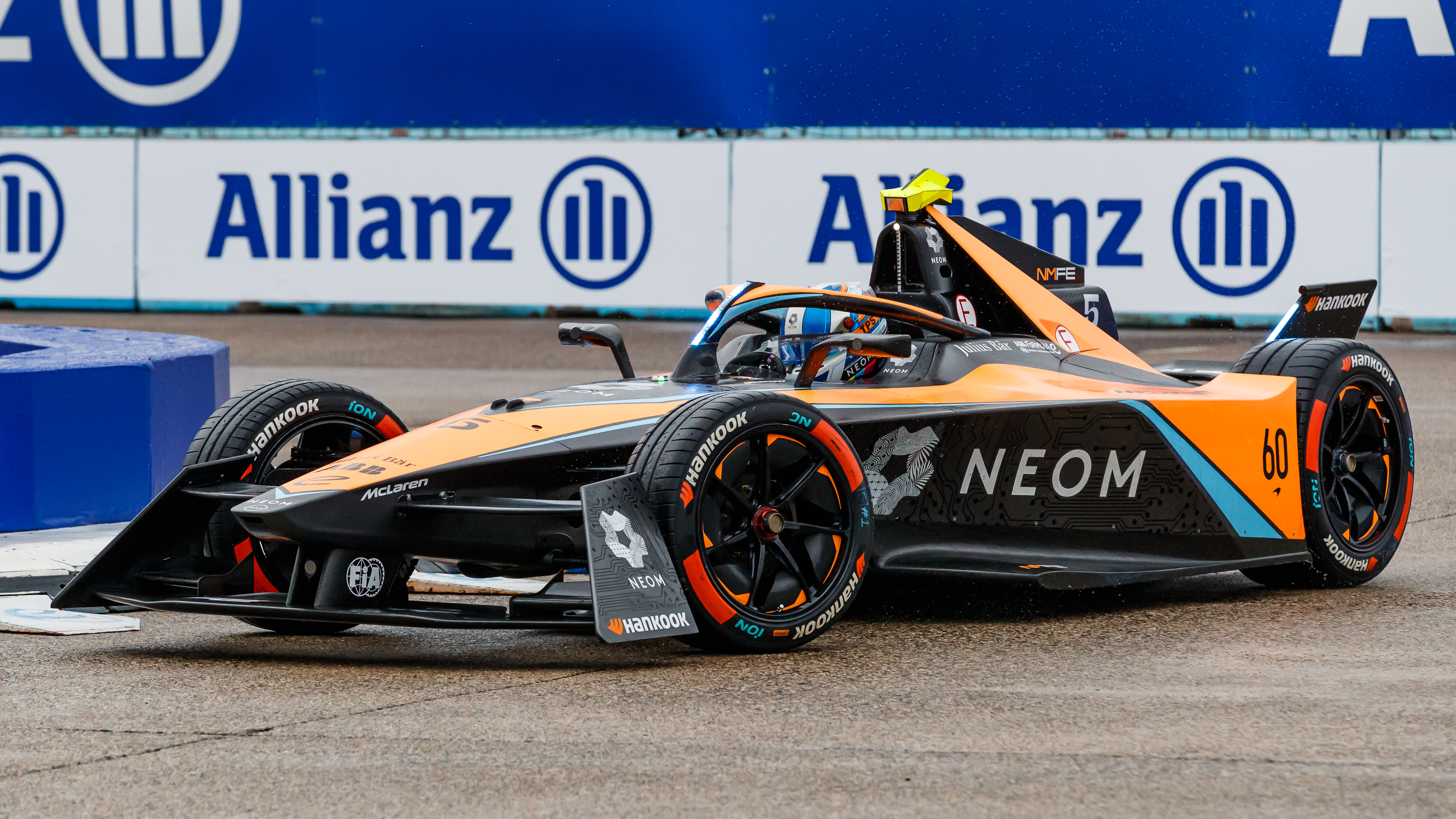
NEOM McLaren Gen3 at the Berlin ePrix.

The Gen3 Formula E car was unveiled to the public at the 2022 Monaco ePrix, for use in the ninth Formula E season (2022–23) onwards. Power levels for the car are 469 horsepower (350 kW) in qualifying and 402 horsepower (300 kW) in the race, while regeneration is allowed on both front (250 kW) and rear (350 kW) axles for a maximum of 600 kW recovery under braking. Regenerative braking could provide 40% of the total energy used within a race.

The estimated top speed is 322 km/h (200 mph). The battery is also designed to be able to handle "ultra-fast charging" at rates of up to 600 kW, allowing pitstop recharging into the championship for the first time. The wheelbase has been reduced from 3,100 mm (122.0 in) to 2,970 mm (116.9 in) and the weight reduced to 760 kilograms (1,680 lb).

Spark Racing Technology builds the chassis and supplies the front axle MGU, Williams Advanced Engineering supplies the battery, and Hankook supplies all-weather tyres incorporating bio-material and sustainable rubber.

=== Gen4 car (from 2026) ===
The Gen4 car for Formula E was officially unveiled on November 5, 2025, and is designed to deliver a significant performance uplift compared to the preceding Gen3 Evo car. Among its headline figures are a peak power output of 805 horsepower (600 kW) in qualifying and Attack Mode, and 603 horsepower (450 kW) during races with full-time all-wheel-drive, a 50 percent power increase over the Gen3 Evo model. The Gen4 car's increased power, downforce, and tire grip is expected to allow it to exceed the pace of the contemporary Formula 2 car.

The car has two aerodynamic configurations, high-downforce for qualifying and low-drag for races. The new Podium Advanced Technologies-supplied battery provides 55 kWh of usable energy and up to 700 kW of regenerative braking or charging. Due to the strengthened crash safety structures for the expected higher speeds, larger battery, and larger aerodynamic package, weight has increased to 1,012 kg (2,231 lb) and length by 520 mm (20.5 in) to 5,540 mm (218.1 in). The tires are wider and supplied by Bridgestone, marking its return to supplying single-seater racecars, which it last did for Formula One in 2009. The addition of a dedicated wet weather tire ("Monsoon tire") for the first time in Formula E, allows the standard dry tires to use a more aggressive tread pattern and grippier compound. Power steering has been added for the first time in a Formula E car, and the rear axle features friction brakes again on the rear axle due to the higher expected speeds. Sustainability features of the chassis include 100 percent recyclable construction with at least 20 percent recycled content.

Teams continue to develop the rear powertrain and associated systems, while the front powertrain remains provided by a common supplier, Marelli. Teams are now allowed to develop the rear suspension, adaptive active-locking limited-slip differentials on both axles, and brake-by-wire system.

=== Comparison ===
Comparison of Formula E car generations
	Gen1	Gen2	Gen3	Gen3 Evo	Gen4
Season introduced	S1 (2014/2015)	S5 (2018/2019)	S9 (2022/2023)	S11 (2024/2025)	S13 (2026/2027)
Length	5,000 mm (196.9 in)	5,200 mm (204.7 in)	5,016.2 mm (197.5 in)	5,020 mm (197.6 in)	5,540 mm (218.1 in)
Height	1,050 mm (41.3 in)	1,063.5 mm (41.9 in)	1,023.4 mm (40.3 in)	1,025 mm (40.4 in)	1,025 mm (40.4 in)
Width	1,780 mm (70.1 in)	1,800 mm (70.9 in)	1,700 mm (66.9 in)	1,707 mm (67.2 in)	1,800 mm (70.9 in)
Wheelbase	3,100 mm (122.0 in)		2,970.5 mm (116.9 in)	2,960–2,980 mm (116.5–117.3 in)	3,080 mm (121.3 in)
Mass (incl. driver)	900 kg (1,984 lb)		856 kg (1,887 lb)	863 kg (1,903 lb)	1,012 kg (2,231 lb)
Maximum power	230 kW (308 hp)	250 kW (335 hp)	350 kW (469 hp)	400 kW (536 hp)	600 kW (805 hp)
Race power	150–180 kW (201–241 hp)	200–220 kW (268–295 hp)	300 kW (402 hp)		450 kW (603 hp)
Battery capacity (usable)	28 kWh	52 kWh	38.5 kWh		55 kWh
Battery mass	320 kg (705 lb)	385 kg (849 lb)	284 kg (626 lb)		
Maximum regeneration	150 kW	250 kW	600 kW		700 kW
Top speed	225 km/h (140 mph)	280 km/h (174 mph)	320 km/h (199 mph)		>337 km/h (209 mph)
Powertrain	Rear			Front and rear	
Tyre Supplier	Michelin		Hankook		Bridgestone
Pole Time at Berlin (2017–2023 layout)	1:08.208 (2017 R2)	1:05.972 (2022 R2)	1:05.605 (2023 R1)	N/A	
Pole Time at Monaco (Grand Prix layout)	N/A	1:29.839 (2022)	1:28.773 (2023)	1:26.222 (2026 R2)	
Range	50 km (31 mi)	100 km (62 mi)	94 km (58 mi)		

=== Safety Car ===
During the first seven seasons, a BMW i8 plug-in hybrid was employed as the Formula E safety car. During the 2020–21 season, a Mini Electric (called the Electric Pacesetter by JCW) was used as safety car for selected races. From 2022, a Porsche Taycan has been used. Bruno Correia is the official safety car driver.

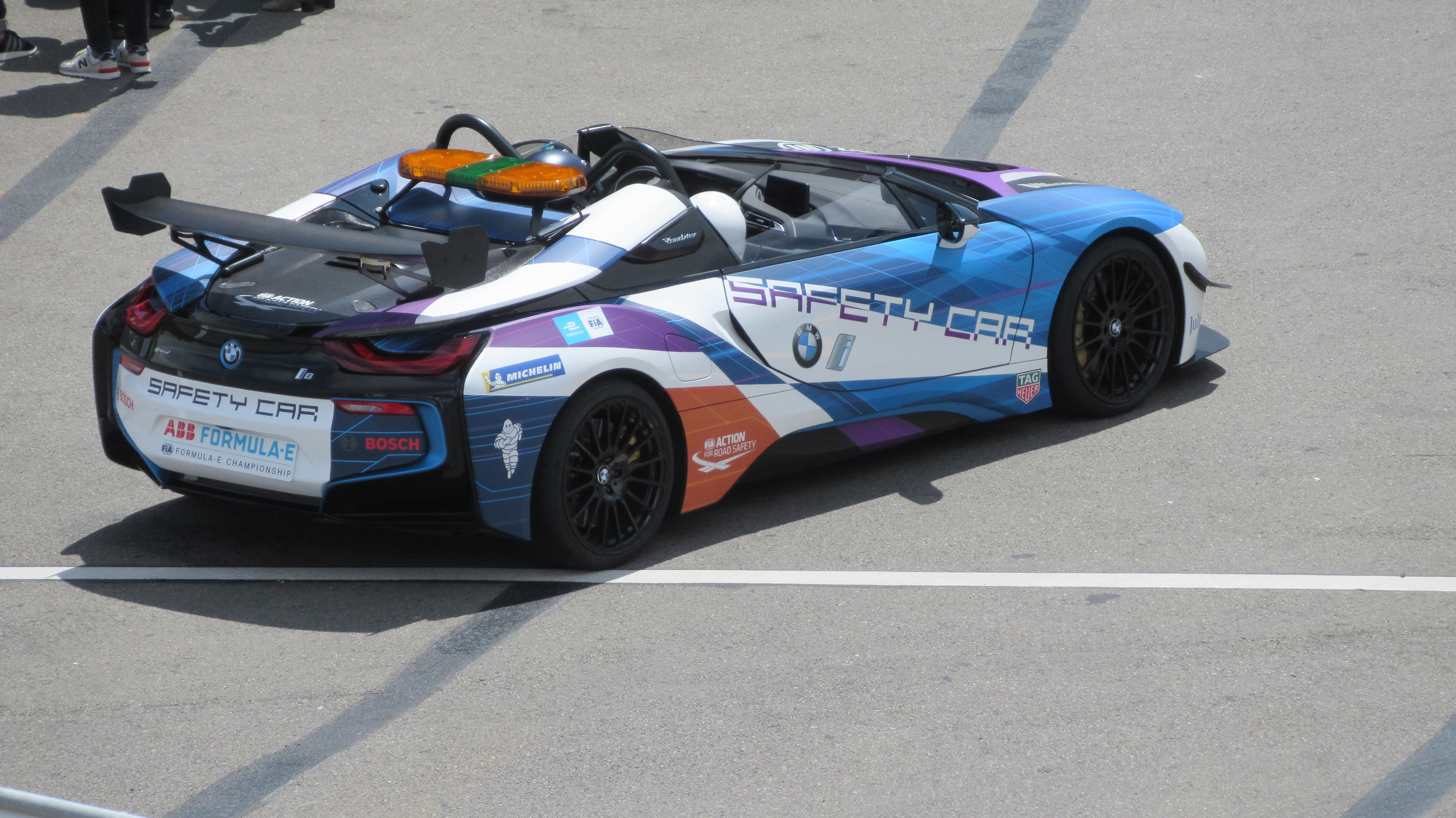
The BMW i8

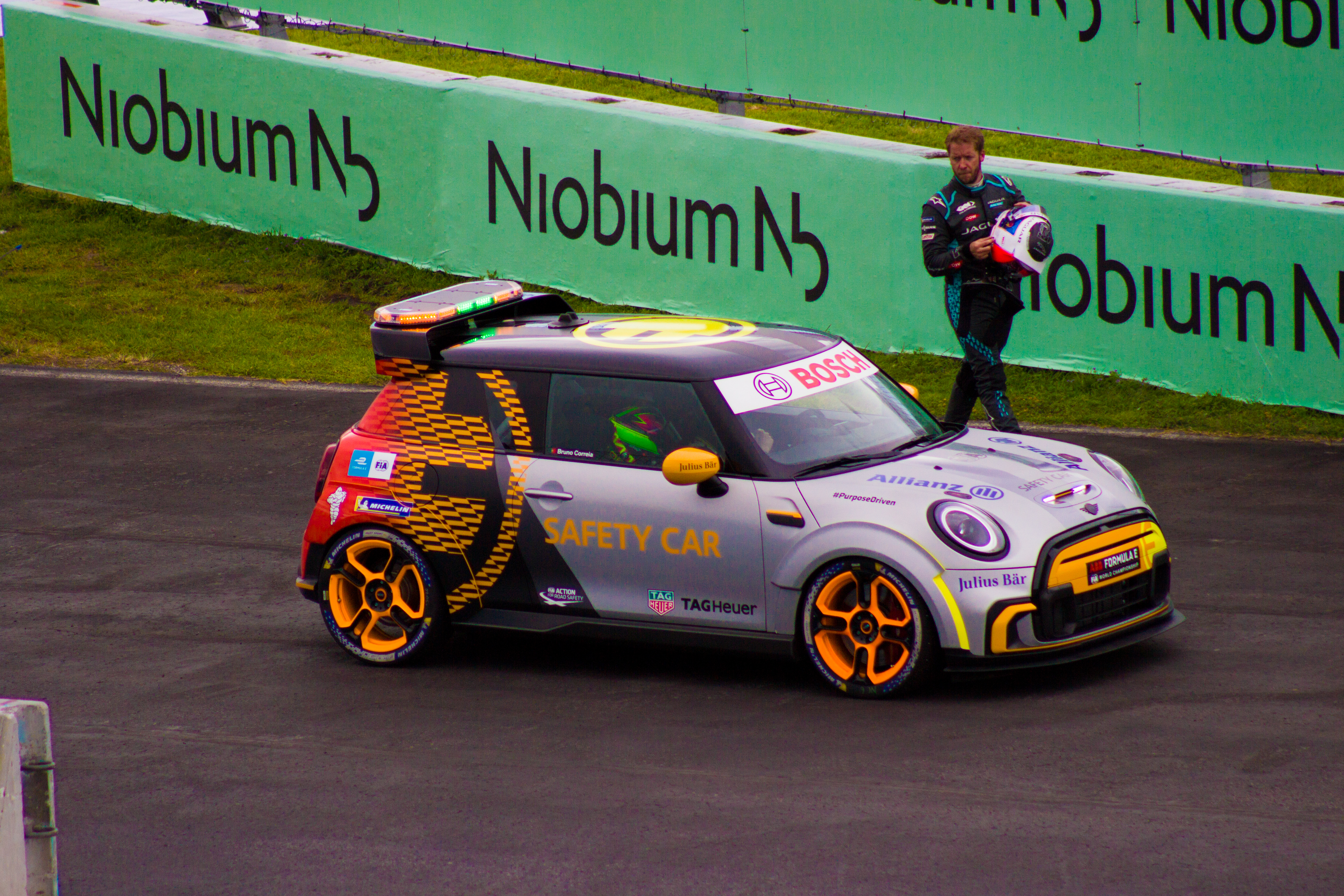
Mini Electric

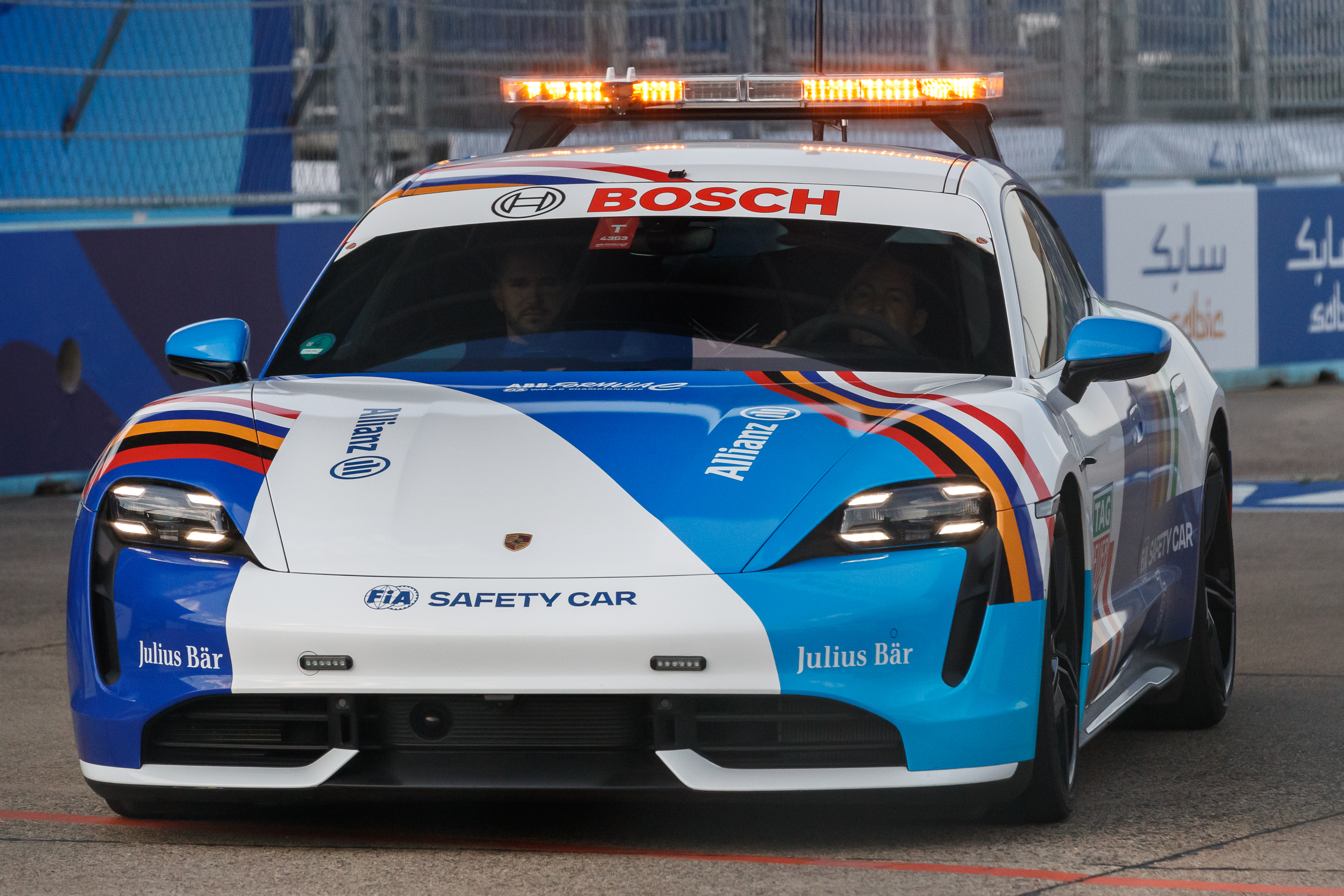
Porsche Taycan

== Seasons ==
=== 2014–15 ===
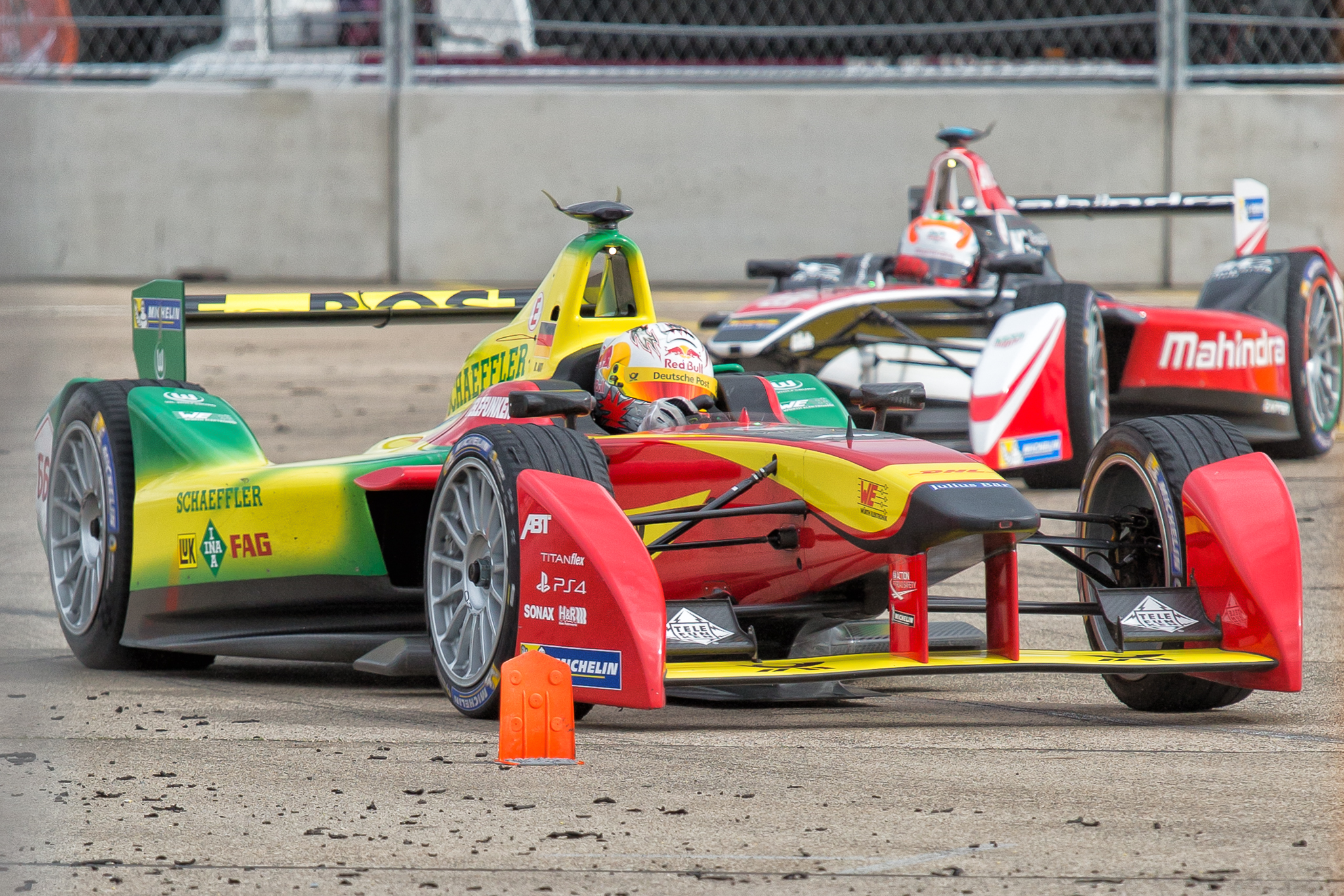
Daniel Abt during the 2015 Berlin ePrix.

The calendar consisted of 11 races held in 10 different host cities: Beijing, Putrajaya, Punta del Este, Buenos Aires, Long Beach, Miami, Monte Carlo, Berlin, Moscow and finally London, where last two rounds of the championship took place.

The first Formula E race at the Beijing Olympic Green Circuit on 13 September 2014 was won by Lucas Di Grassi, after Nick Heidfeld and Nicolas Prost crashed out on the final corner. In the course of the season, there were 7 different race winners: Sébastien Buemi (three times), Sam Bird (twice), Nelson Piquet Jr. (twice), António Félix da Costa, Nicolas Prost, Jérôme d'Ambrosio and Lucas Di Grassi.

The championship was decided with the last race in London, where Nelson Piquet Jr. became the first Formula E champion, only a single point ahead of Sébastien Buemi. Piquet, Buemi, and Di Grassi all had a theoretical chance at winning the title in the final round. The team championship was decided on the second to last race, with e.dams Renault (232 points) winning ahead of Dragon Racing (171 points) who surpassed ABT in the final round of the championship.

=== 2015–16 ===
First lap of the 2015 Punta del Este ePrix

The second season of Formula E started in October 2015 and ended in early July 2016. The calendar consisted of 10 races in 9 different cities. For this season eight manufacturers were introduced, who were allowed to develop new powertrains. Sébastien Buemi won the championship with only 2 points more than Lucas di Grassi by claiming the fastest lap in the final race in London.

=== 2016–17 ===
The 2016–17 FIA Formula E season was the third season of the FIA Formula E championship. It started in October 2016 in Hong Kong and ended in July 2017 in Montreal. Lucas di Grassi won the championship in the last race of the season, 24 points ahead of Sébastien Buemi and 54 points ahead of third-placed rookie driver Felix Rosenqvist. The Renault e.Dams team successfully defended their team championship title.

=== 2017–18 ===
The 2017–18 FIA Formula E season was the fourth season of the FIA Formula E championship. It started in December 2017 in Hong Kong and ended in July 2018. Jean-Éric Vergne clinched the title with a race to spare in New York by finishing fifth while title rival Sam Bird failed to score enough points to keep the fight going into the final race of the season.

After a difficult first half of the season, Audi Sport ABT Schaeffler improved in the second half and passed Techeetah at the final race to claim the teams' championship by two points.

=== 2018–19 ===
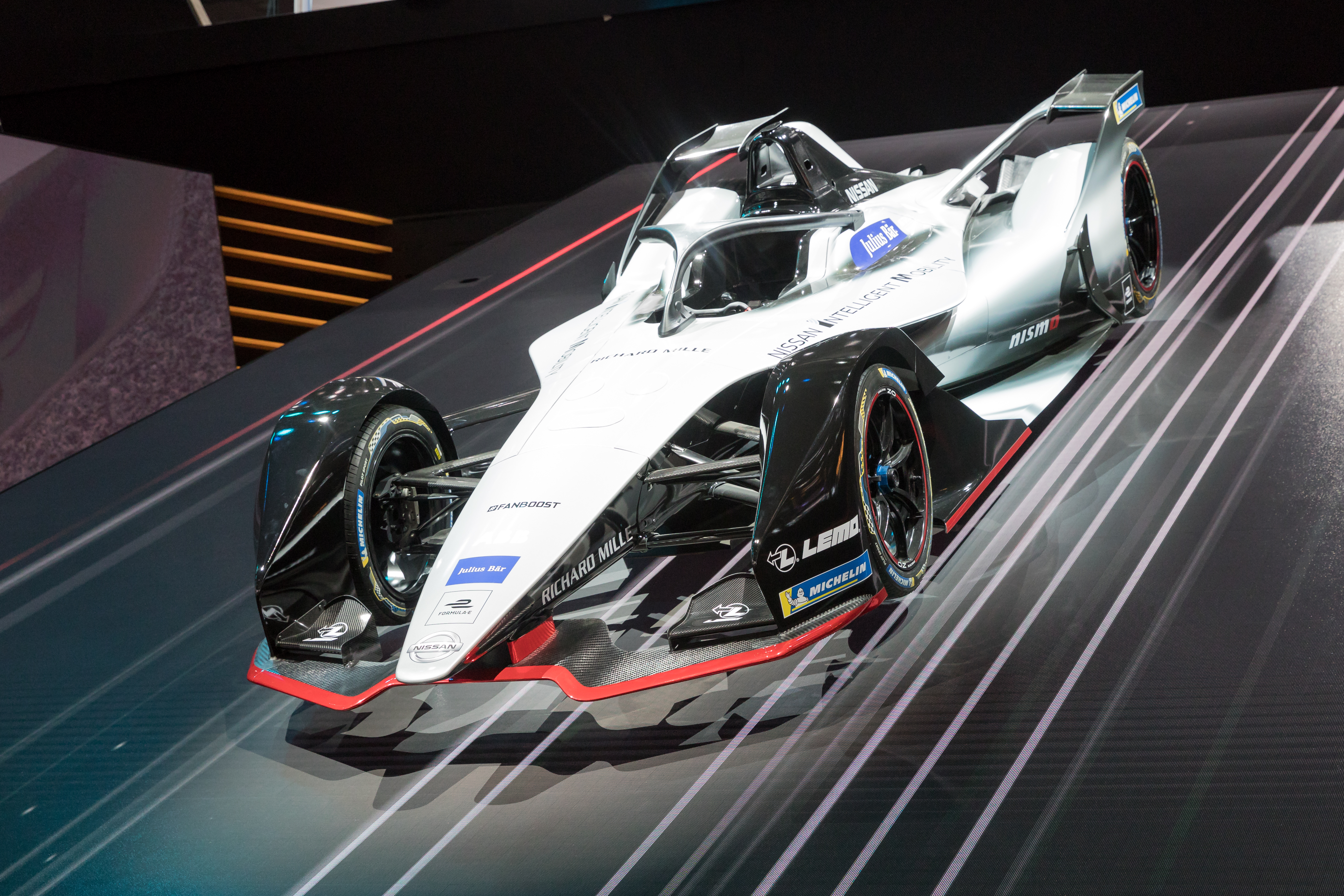
A SRT05e at the Geneva motor show 2018 (in Nissan concept livery) that was used from Formula E's 5th season onward.

The Gen2 race car was introduced for season five with significantly improved power and range, thus eliminating the need to change cars and pit stops altogether except for damage. However, cars are still vulnerable to power exhaustions if red flags and safety cars lengthen races. Gen2 also saw the introduction of the halo driver protection system. The car was unveiled in January 2018.

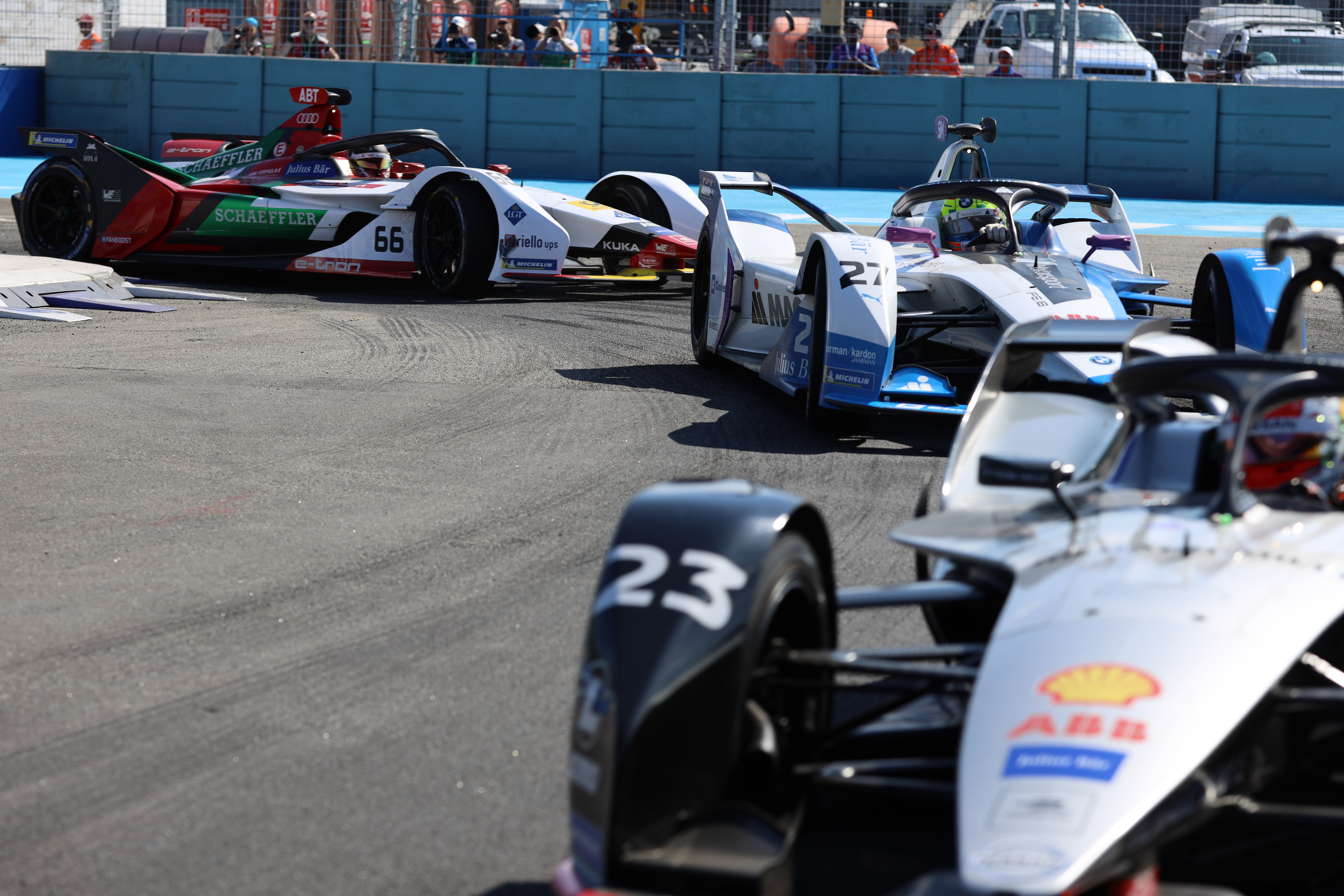
Daniel Abt driving for Audi Sport ABT Schaeffler at the 2019 New York City ePrix. In front of him are Alexander Sims for Andretti Autosport and Sébastien Buemi for Nissan e.dams.

BMW, Nissan and DS Automobiles would join Formula E as official manufacturers for the 2018–19 season, with Nissan replacing Renault, which had exited the championship to focus its resources on its Formula 1 team. The format of the races also changed from a set number of laps to 45 minutes plus one lap.

The 2019 Hong Kong ePrix was the 50th race of Formula E since its inception in 2014. Formula E raced in 20 cities, across five continents, seen 13 global manufactures commit to the series. Four drivers have started all 50 Formula E races: Lucas di Grassi, Sam Bird, Daniel Abt and Jérôme d'Ambrosio.

After the first race in New York City, Jean-Eric Vergne won his second Formula E championship, becoming the first driver to win more than 1 championship title, and a back-to-back championship title. Techeetah won their first constructor's championship.

=== 2019–20 ===
For the sixth season of Formula E, two more manufacturers joined the series: Mercedes-Benz and Porsche. A number of rule changes were introduced to the championship, most notably the deduction of usable energy under safety car and Full Course Yellow conditions, with drivers having energy subtracted at 1 kW⋅h per minute. Due to the COVID-19 pandemic the championship was suspended in March 2020 and all scheduled races were eventually cancelled. The season was completed in August with six races at the Tempelhof Airport Street Circuit in Berlin on three different layouts (a race on the reverse layout, a race on the normal layout, and a race with a new extended layout) with two races each.

The season's champion was António Félix da Costa who clinched his first title with two races left. DS Techeetah became team champions for the second time in a row.

=== 2020–21 ===
Starting with its seventh season, the Formula E Championship was granted FIA World Championship status, due to it having met the criteria of having four manufacturer competitors and races on three continents since the 2015–16 season. The facelift of the Spark Gen2 car called the Gen2 EVO, was originally scheduled to debut in this season, but was later delayed and eventually cancelled due to the COVID-19 pandemic.

In late 2020, Audi and BMW announced their withdrawal from Formula E after the 2020–21 season, although BMW and Audi allowed Andretti Autosport and Envision Racing respectively to continue using their powertrains during the 2021–22 season.

The season ended in August 2021 with 15 races. Nyck de Vries claimed his first world champion title after winning two races, while Mercedes-EQ won the teams' championship.

=== 2021–22 ===
The 2021–22 FIA Formula E season is the eighth season of the FIA Formula E World Championship and the final season of the "Gen2" car era. The season started in January 2022 in Diriyah.

Instead of removing usable energy from drivers under the safety car and FCY, there will be added time to the race. For every full minute the race is neutralized within the first 40 minutes, there is 45 seconds of added time. This can add up to a maximum of 10 minutes.

Race power was also increased to 220 kW and attack mode was increased to 250 kW, matching the power from Fanboost.

Season 8 also introduced a new qualifying format, featuring 2 groups, A and B, where the top 4 in each would progress to duels. Stoffel Vandoorne won the Drivers title, whilst Mercedes EQ won the teams championship for the second time in a row.

=== 2022–23 ===
The 2022–23 FIA Formula E season was the ninth season of the FIA Formula E World Championship, and the debut season of the Gen3 era. It saw Maserati and McLaren make their debuts in the series and the return of Abt Sportsline with the Spanish brand Cupra Racing. Laps replaced timed races, and for every safety car or FCY intervention, there were added laps to compensate for missed racing laps.

Pit stops were originally also supposed to make a return to the series (in the form of Attack Charge) which was set to be trialed at select races, however the introduction of this race format was delayed to the 2023–24 season and beyond, after several issues with the new car's batteries came up before the season, which caused delays in the production of the fast chargers.

Originally also, in at least two races, each team would have to field a driver with no previous Formula E experience in the first practice session. However, after teams criticized this rule, the series then decided that instead as a compromise, they would hold two rookie test sessions, one being after the doubleheader Berlin ePrix, and the other being before the doubleheader Rome ePrix.

The drivers' championship was won by Jake Dennis (Avalanche Andretti Formula E), and the teams' championship was won by Envision Racing.

=== 2023–24 ===
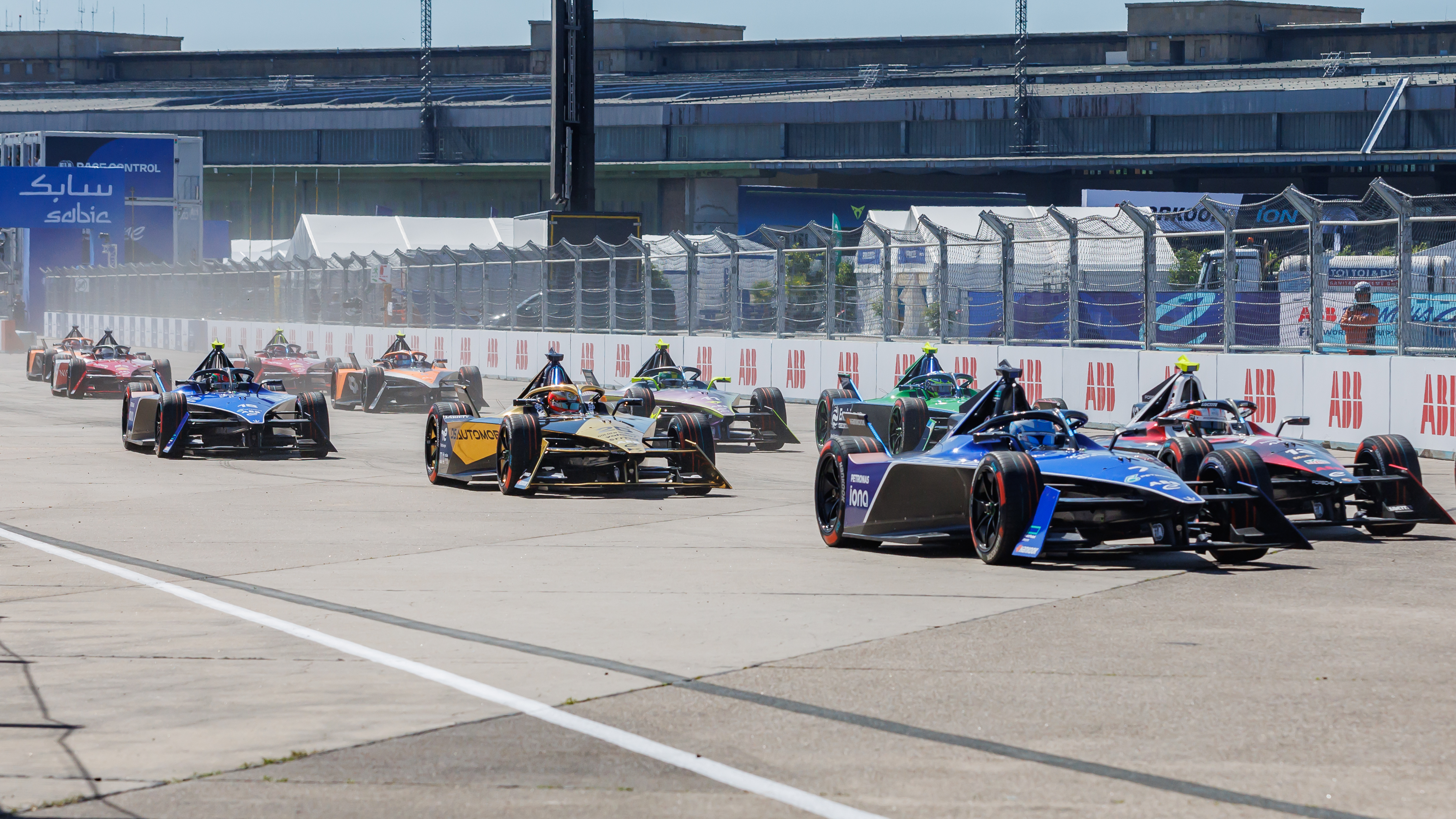
2024 Berlin ePrix.

The 2023–24 FIA Formula E was the tenth season of the FIA Formula E World Championship, with 16 races taking place from January to July 2024 across 10 venues. For the first time, it featured a championship for manufacturers (in addition to the existing drivers' and teams' championships).

The calendar Season 10 was announced in November 2023, featuring new venues Misano, Shanghai, and a world-first race held in the streets of Tokyo, Japan, with Portland expanding to a double-header.

Attack Charge was scheduled to be introduced starting at the Misano ePrix. This new feature would have seen drivers take a mandatory pit stop in a specific window during the race, during which the car would have been recharged to award drivers two attack mode boosts and an extra 4 kWh (14.4 MJ) of energy throughout the rest of the race. This feature was originally planned to be introduced in season 9, but after delays in production of the fast charging units it was postponed until season 10. This timeframe was then delayed once again, with the feature postponed to season 11.

The Drivers' Championship was won by Pascal Wehrlein (Porsche Formula E Team), the Teams' Championship was won by Jaguar Racing, and the Manufacturers' Trophy was won by Jaguar.

=== 2024–25 ===
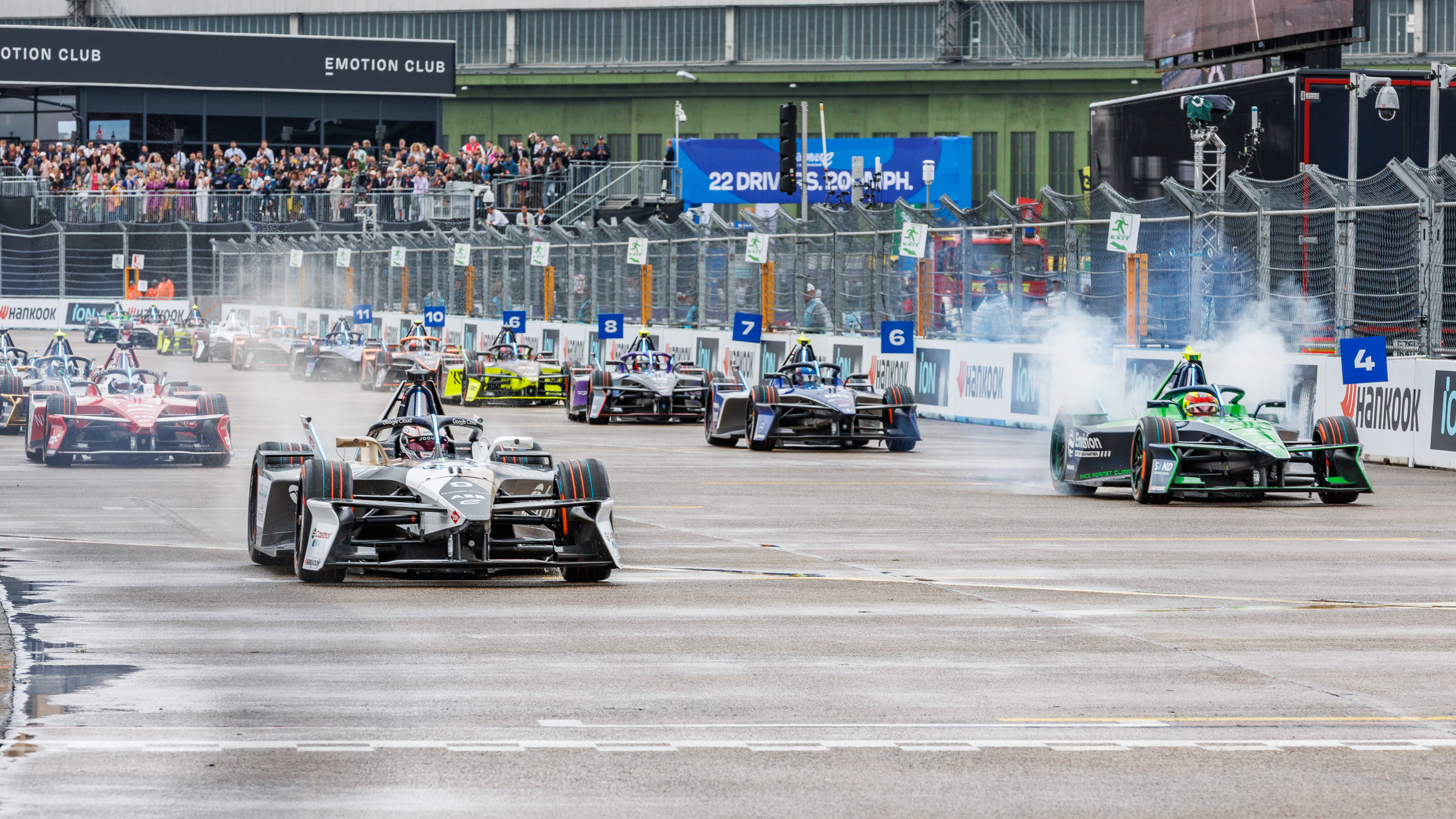
Starting procedure at the 2025 Berlin ePrix.

The 2024–25 FIA Formula E was the eleventh season of the FIA Formula E World Championship, with 16 races took place from December 2024 to July 2025 across 10 venues. The updated Gen3 Evo race car was introduced in the season. The races are held across two calendar years for the first time since the 2019–20 season. Lola and Yamaha joined the series, and cooperated in developing their new powertrain, partnering ABT.

The calendar of Season 11 features new venues in Jeddah and Miami, and the return of the Jakarta ePrix, with Monaco and Tokyo expanding to double-headers.

After multiple postponements, the fast charge feature now known as Pit Boost was introduced in Jeddah.

The Drivers' Championship was won by Oliver Rowland (Nissan Formula E Team), the Teams' Championship was won by Porsche Formula E Team, and the Manufacturers' Championship was won by Porsche.

=== 2025–26 ===
The 2025–26 FIA Formula E is the twelfth season of the FIA Formula E World Championship, with 17 races set to take place from December 2025 to August 2026 across 11 venues. McLaren has left the championship ahead of the season, with Citroën Racing entering the championship to replace Maserati.

The calendar of Season 12 features new venues in Miami and Madrid, and the return of the Sanya ePrix.

The Drivers' Championship was won by Pascal Wehrlein (Porsche Formula E Team), the Teams' Championship was won by Jaguar TCS Racing, and the Manufacturers' Championship was won by Porsche.

=== 2026–27 ===
The 2026–27 FIA Formula E is set to be the thirteenth season of the FIA Formula E World Championship, with 21 races set to take place from January to July 2027 across 13 venues. Opel and a second Porsche team are set to join the championship. The season will mark the debut of the Formula E Gen4 race car.

The calendar of Season 13 features new venues in Austin, London and Zandvoort, with Madrid expanding to a double-header.

== Esport series ==
In 2019, the Virtually Live Ghost Racing app was launched. It allows fans to virtually drive alongside the real drivers as the race is going on. In 2020, during the season suspension due to the COVID-19 pandemic, Formula E held an esport series called Race at Home Challenge. In 2021, Formula E introduced a new series called Formula E: Accelerate using the online game rFactor 2. The first season of six races was held between January and March 2021. All Formula E teams participated in the series. The series currently consists of professional sim racers racing virtually on selected race tracks from the season, with the events being called "majors", before the finale on the London Circuit.

== Support series ==
=== FE School Series ===
During the first season, the FE School Series for student teams that developed their own electric car took place as support races at selected events. The series was not continued during the second season.

=== Roborace ===
Roborace was developing the world's first autonomous and electrically powered racing car. The company planned to develop the first global championship for driverless cars. It held demonstrations at selected races during the 2016–17 Formula E season and 2017–18 Formula E season.

=== Jaguar I-Pace eTrophy ===
Formula E and Jaguar ran a production-based support series with Jaguar I-Pace battery electric SUVs. The series was called the I-Pace eTrophy and ran together with Formula E's fifth and sixth seasons (December 2018 to summer 2020). In May 2020, Jaguar announced the cancellation of the series, due to financial issues caused by the COVID-19 Pandemic.

=== NXT Gen Cup ===
In 2024 Formula E announced the NXT Gen Cup, an electric junior (ages 15–25) touring car series, as support series to the championship. The NXT Gen Cup was set to feature at all four European rounds of season 10 in Misano, Monaco, Berlin and London, however shortly before the Misano weekend, the series decided to part ways with Formula E due to "unexpected constraints faced by the support series."

== Media ==
=== Television ===
Formula E provides comprehensive live television coverage shown via major broadcasters around the globe (Disney+, The Roku Channel, TNT Sports UK, CCTV-5, Eurosport, J Sports, Ziggo Sport Totaal, ITV). English language programming is produced by Whisper, while Aurora Media Worldwide produces the main worldwide broadcast.

=== Presenters ===
Up until Season 9, the world feed was presented frequently by Jack Nicholls and Dario Franchitti, with Nicki Shields acting as pit lane reporter. However, just before the 2023 Jakarta ePrix, Nicholls was fired after allegations of inappropriate behaviour towards women. Ben Edwards, who had already done motorsport commentary for 3 decades, replaced him in the commentary booth from Jakarta ePrix until the Portland ePrix. Later that season, Tom Brooks, known as "the Voice of Gran Turismo" became the main commentator of Formula E from the Rome ePrix onwards.

Nicki Shields will anchor Formula E's English Language Programming for Season 12, alongside racing driver Billy Monger, rally driver Catie Munnings, and an expert lineup which will include David Coulthard, Karun Chandhok, André Lotterer, James Rossiter, Jamie Chadwick and Allan McNish. New additions for this season is the presence of 12-time race winner Sam Bird and former McLaren chief engineer Albie Lau as analysts. Alexa Rendell, and Georgina Henneberry will serve as pit lane reporters.

In addition of Tom Brooks, Ryan Myrehn is also assigned as commentator for the American feed.

=== Documentaries ===
Directors Fisher Stevens and Malcolm Venville created a documentary movie about the 2017–18 season called And We Go Green. It highlights some of the innovations and challenges of Formula E and follows several drivers and rivalries throughout the season. The film was co-produced by Leonardo DiCaprio and premiered at the 2019 Toronto International Film Festival.

Formula E debuted its own documentary series, called 'Unplugged' on 22 November 2021, which was similar to Formula One's Netflix Drive to Survive series. The series gave a behind-the-scenes look on every driver's journey through the 2020–21 season. Unplugged returned for a second season in March 2023, showcasing the 2021–22 season, and for a third season in January 2024 showcasing the 2022–23 season.

== Gallery ==
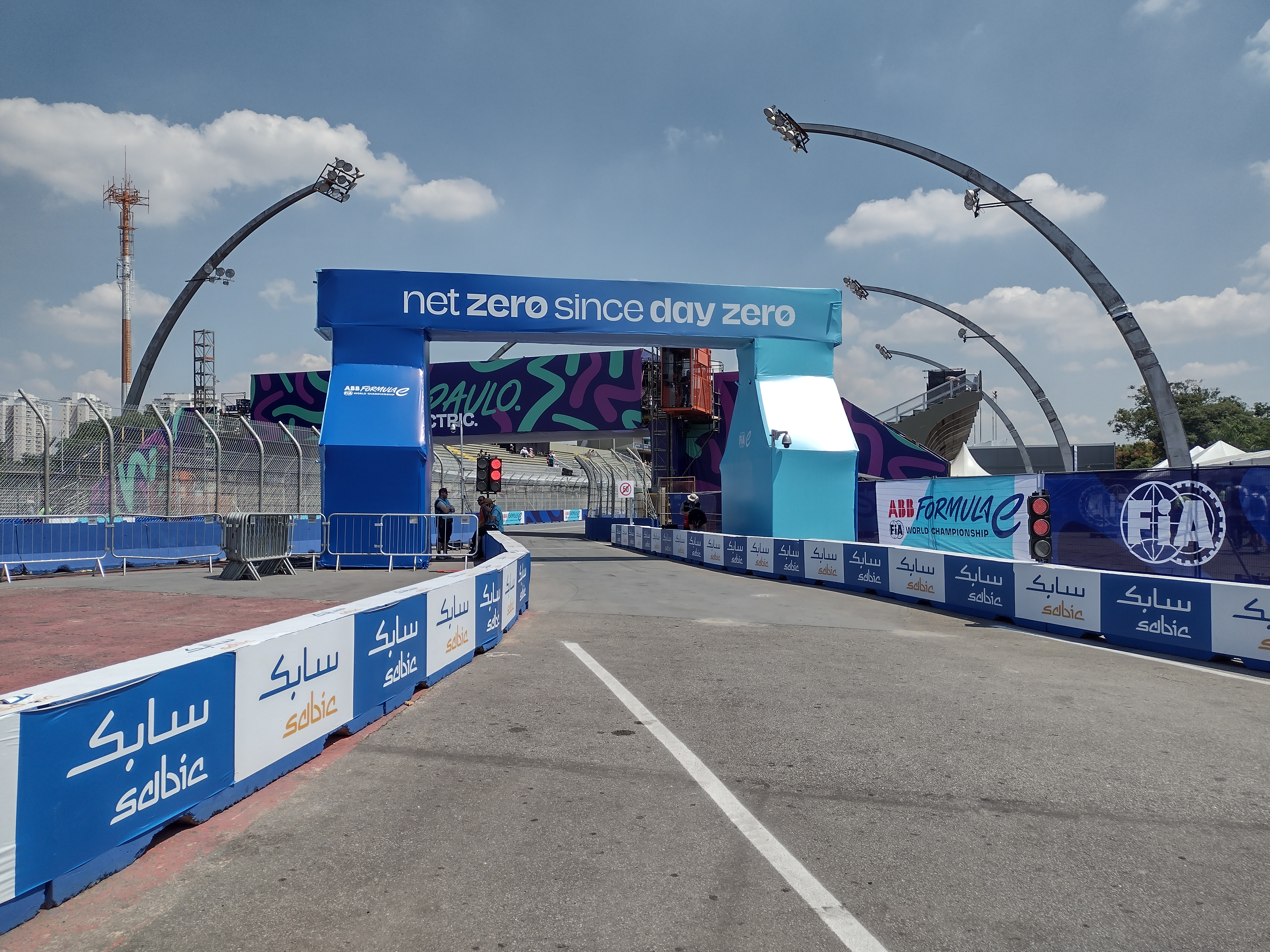
Track signage highlighting sustainability.

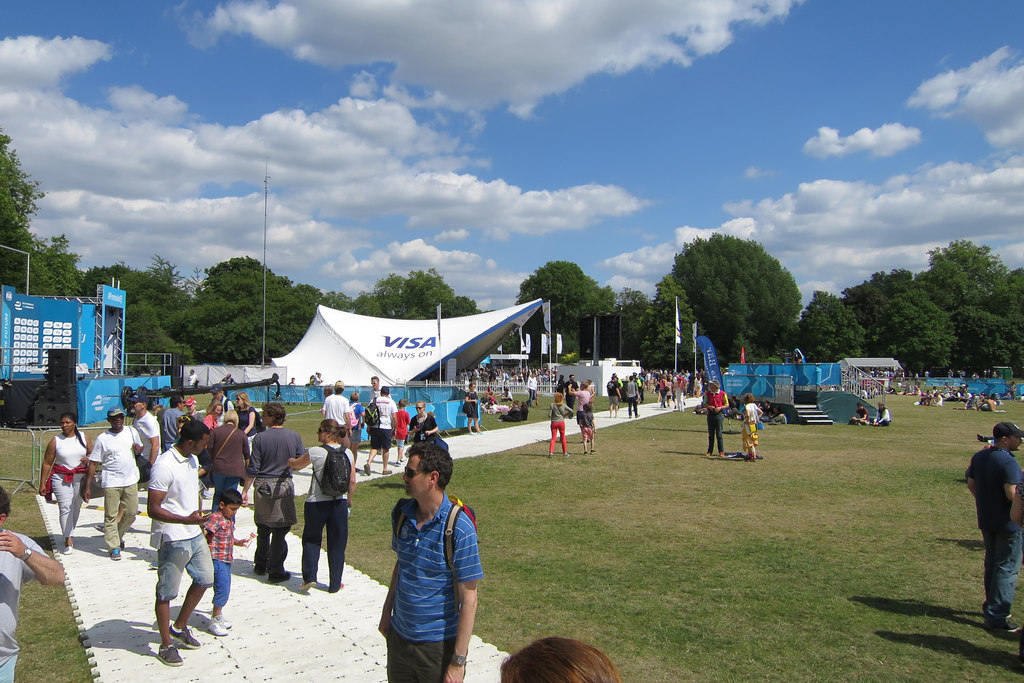
E-Village, 2015.

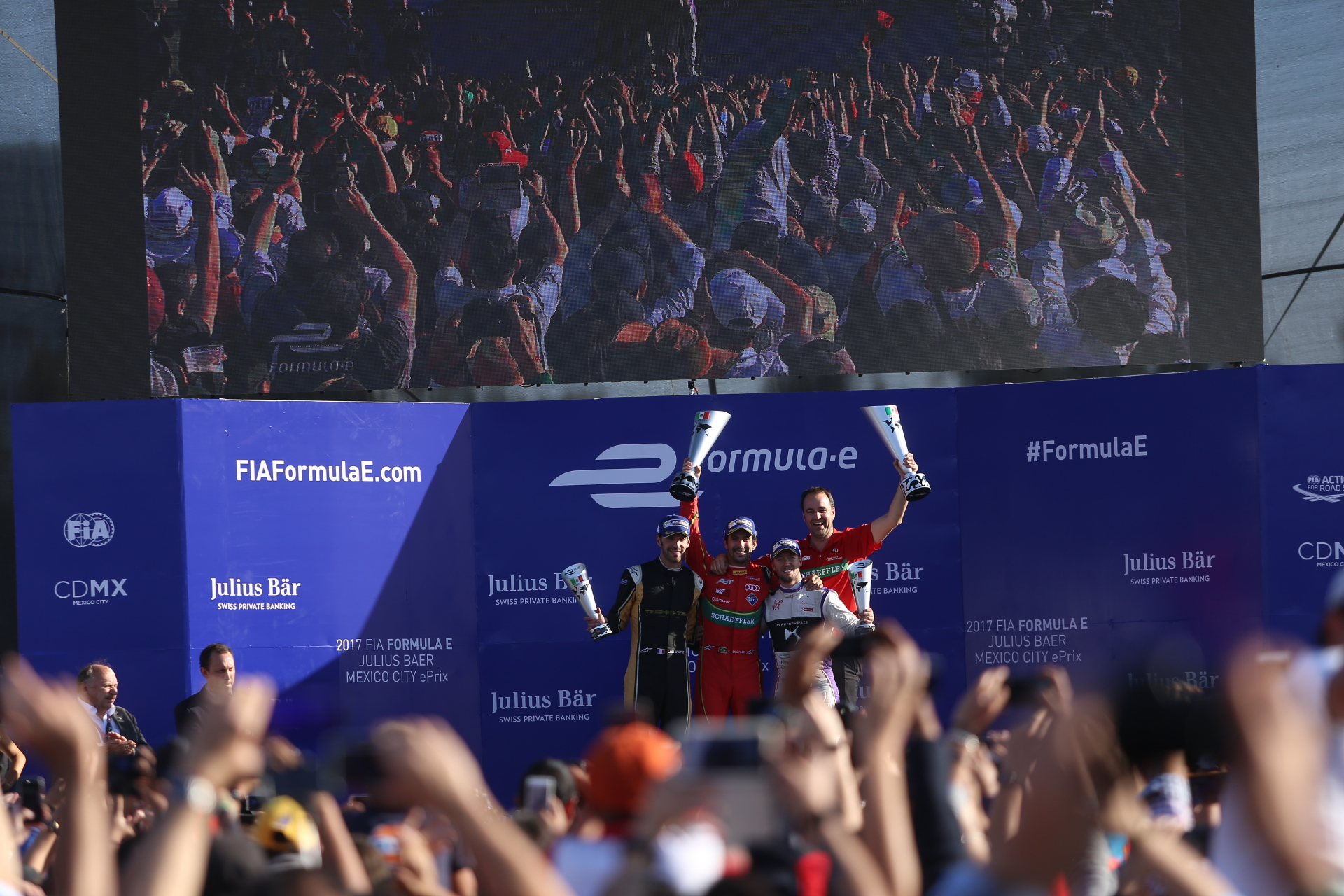
At the podium in 2017.

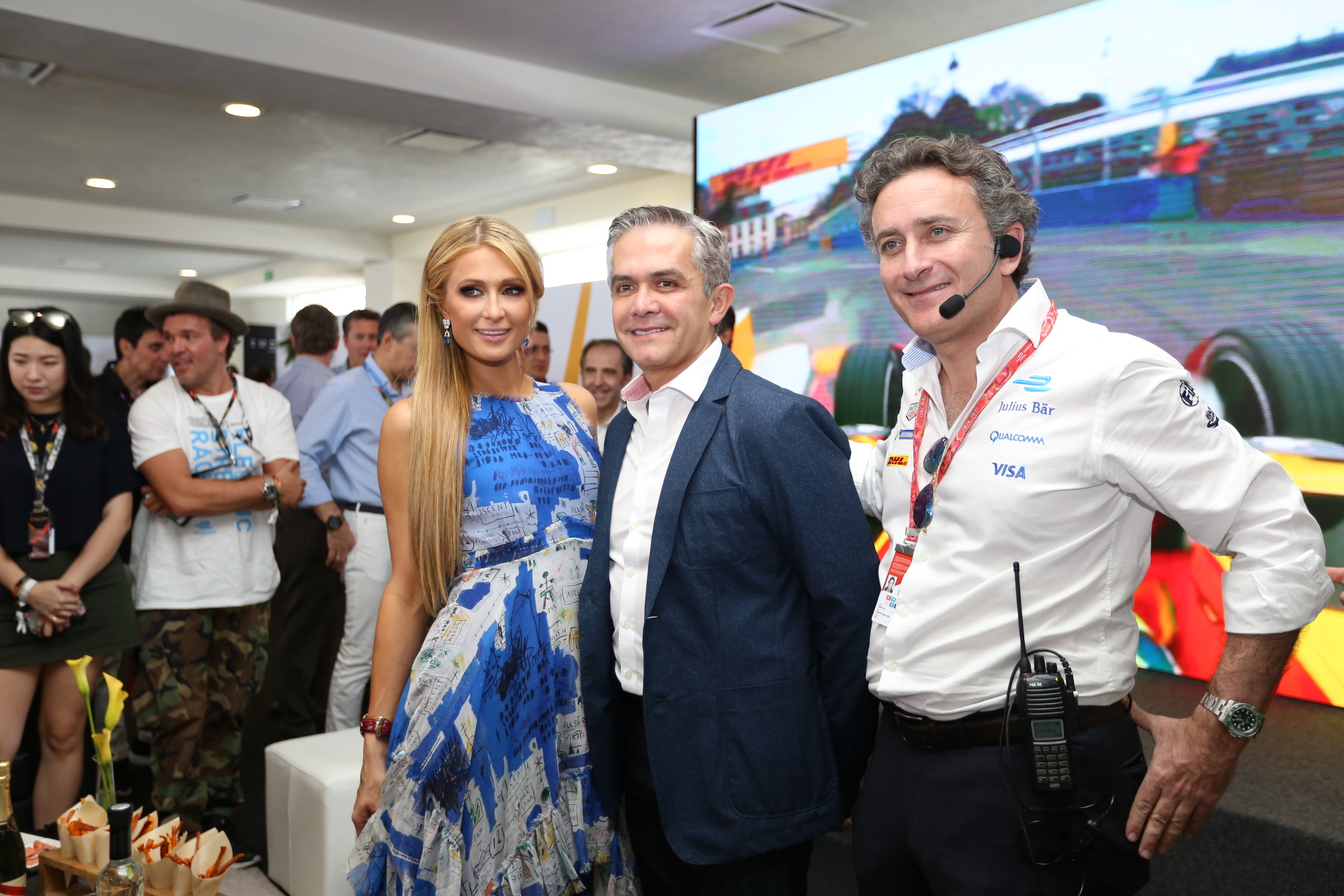
Alejandro Agag (far right) helped to create the championship series.

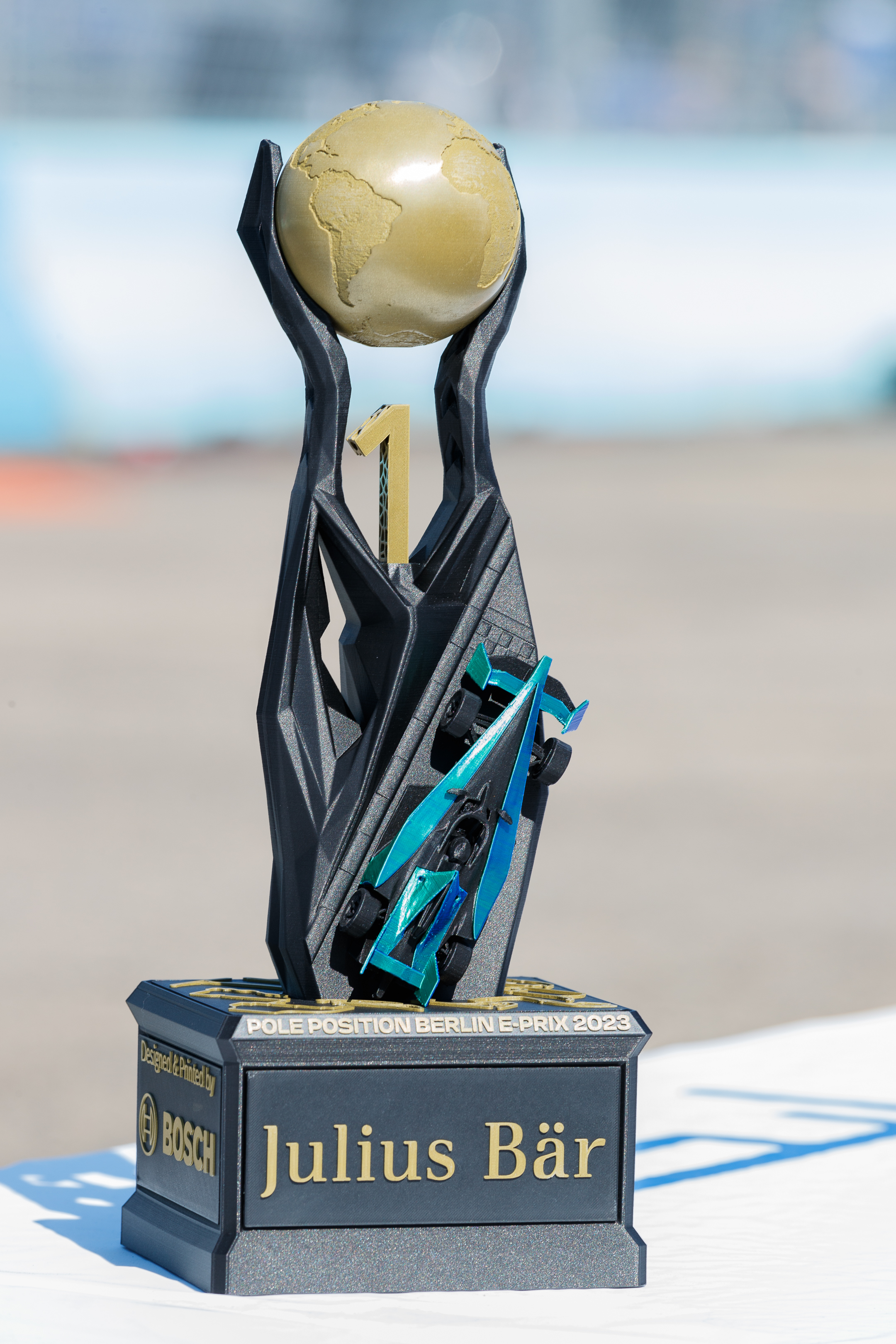
Berlin ePrix 2023 pole position trophy.

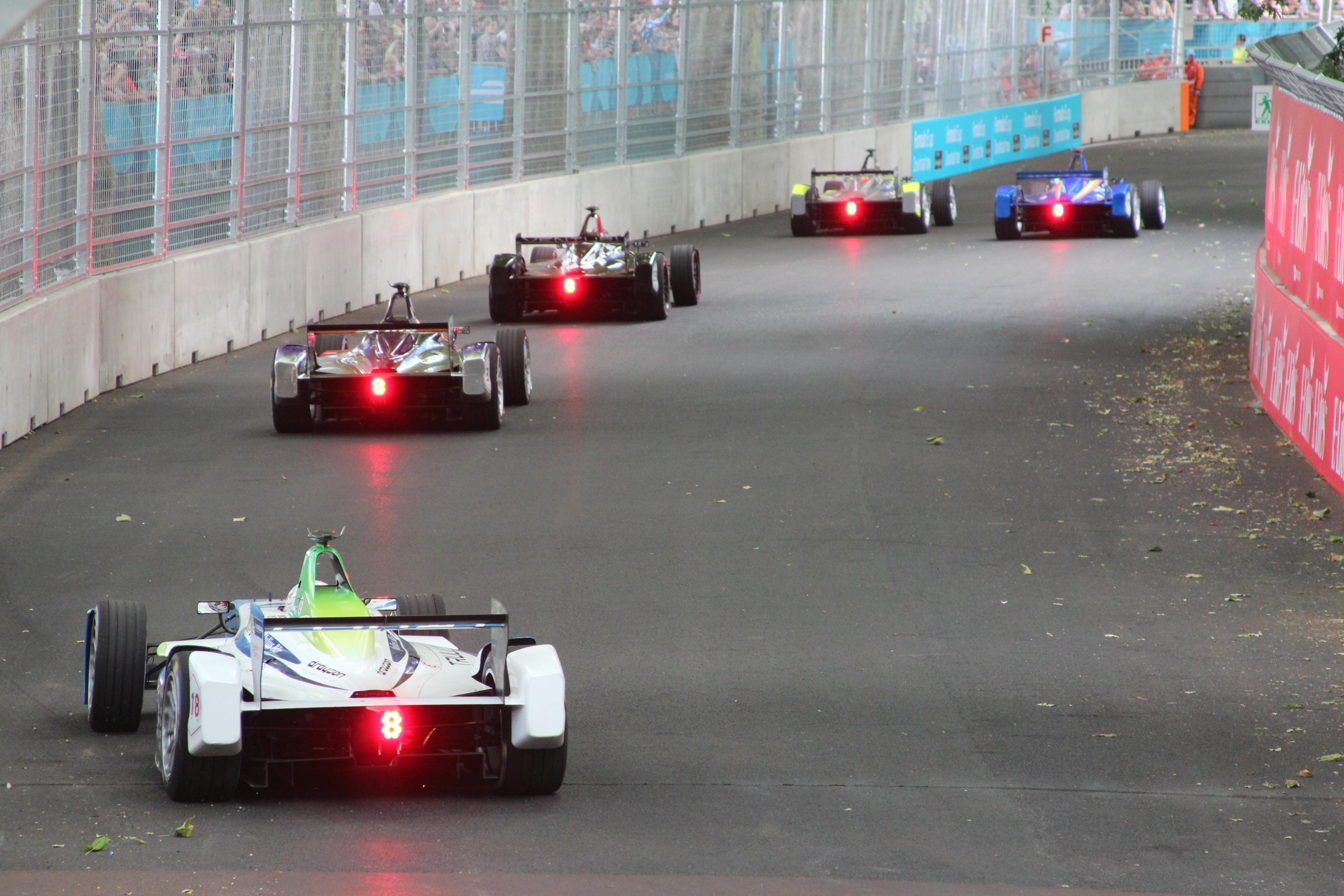
View of the tail light illumination.

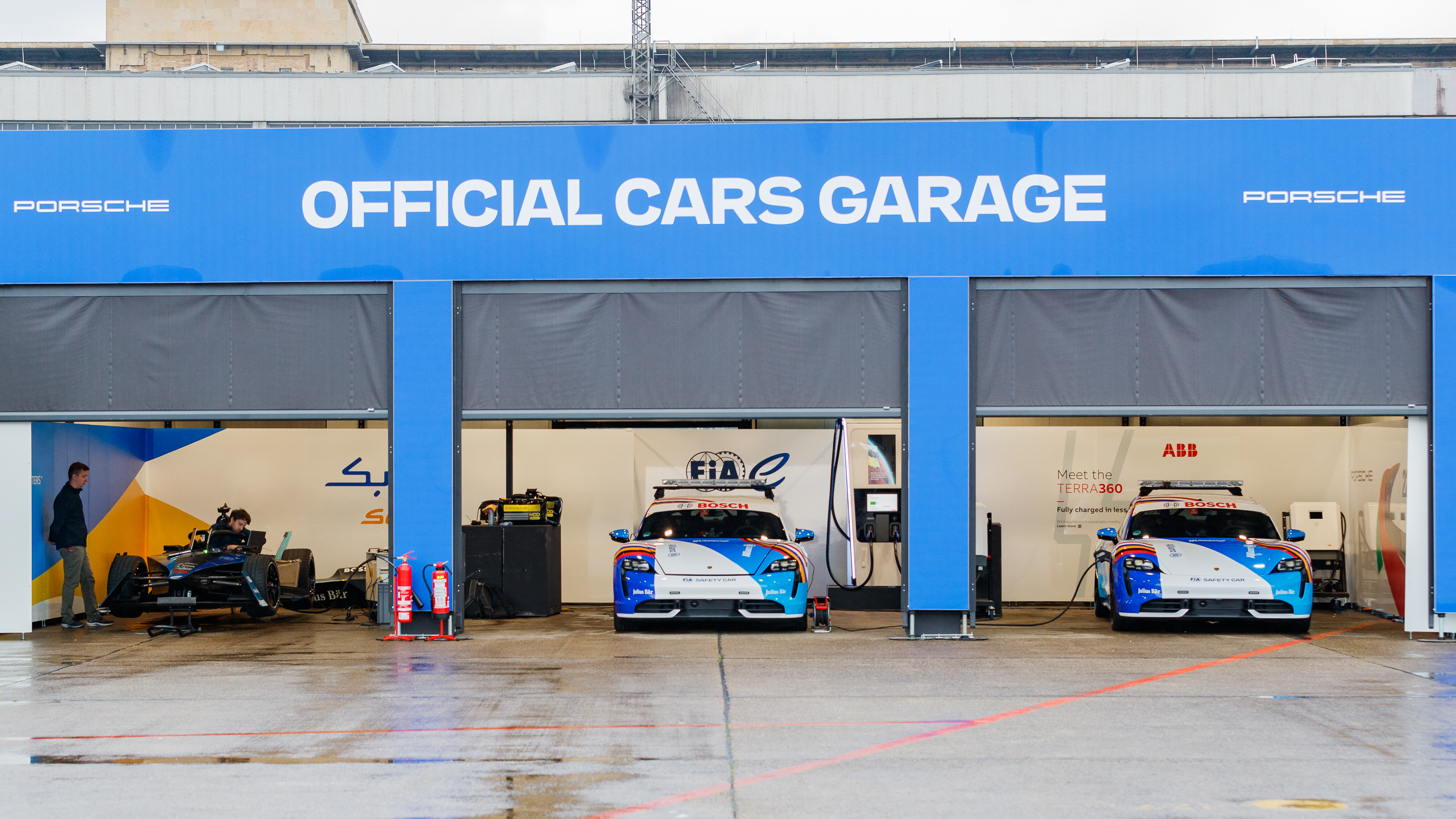
Safety car charging, 2023.

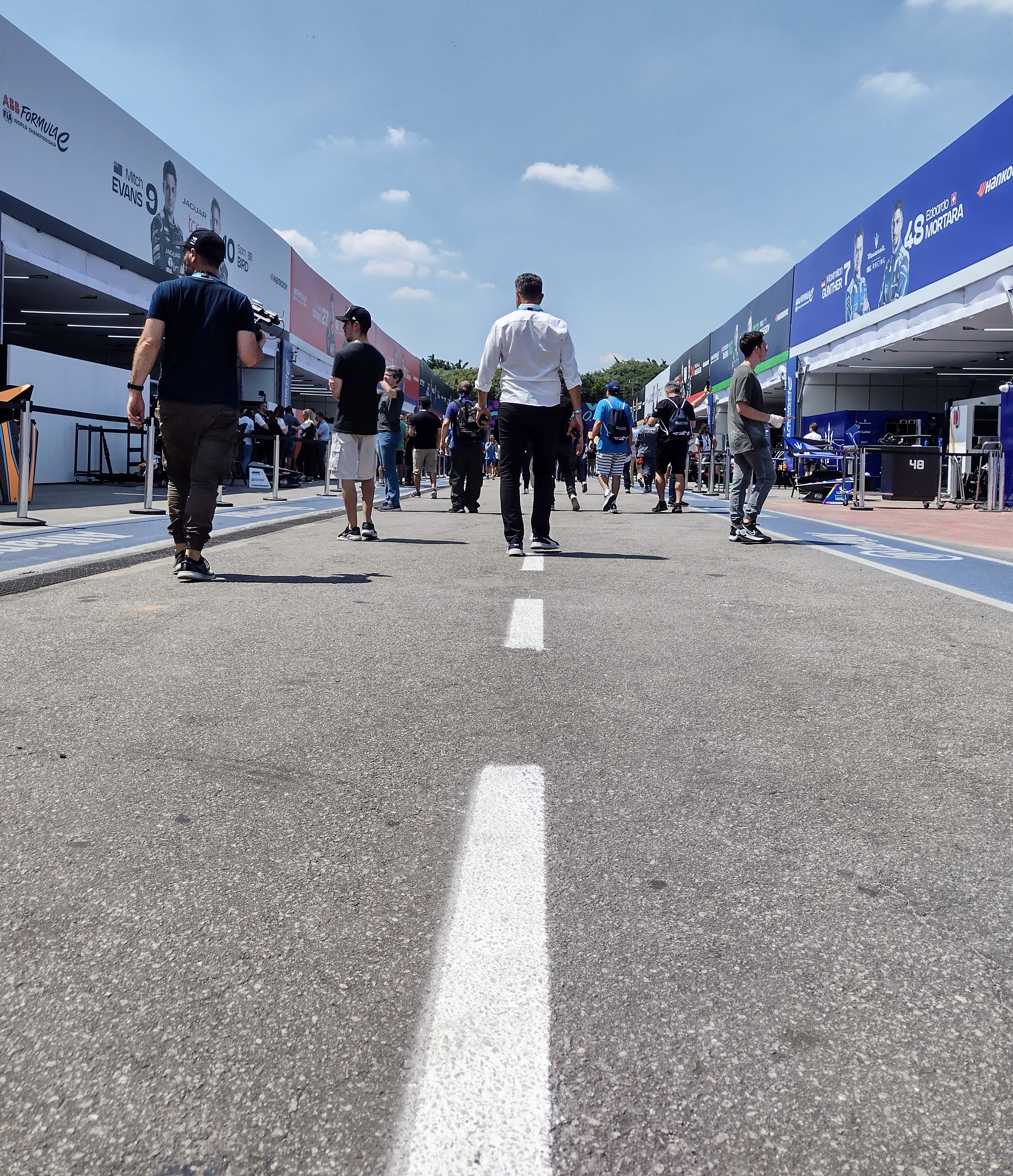
Paddock area, 2023.

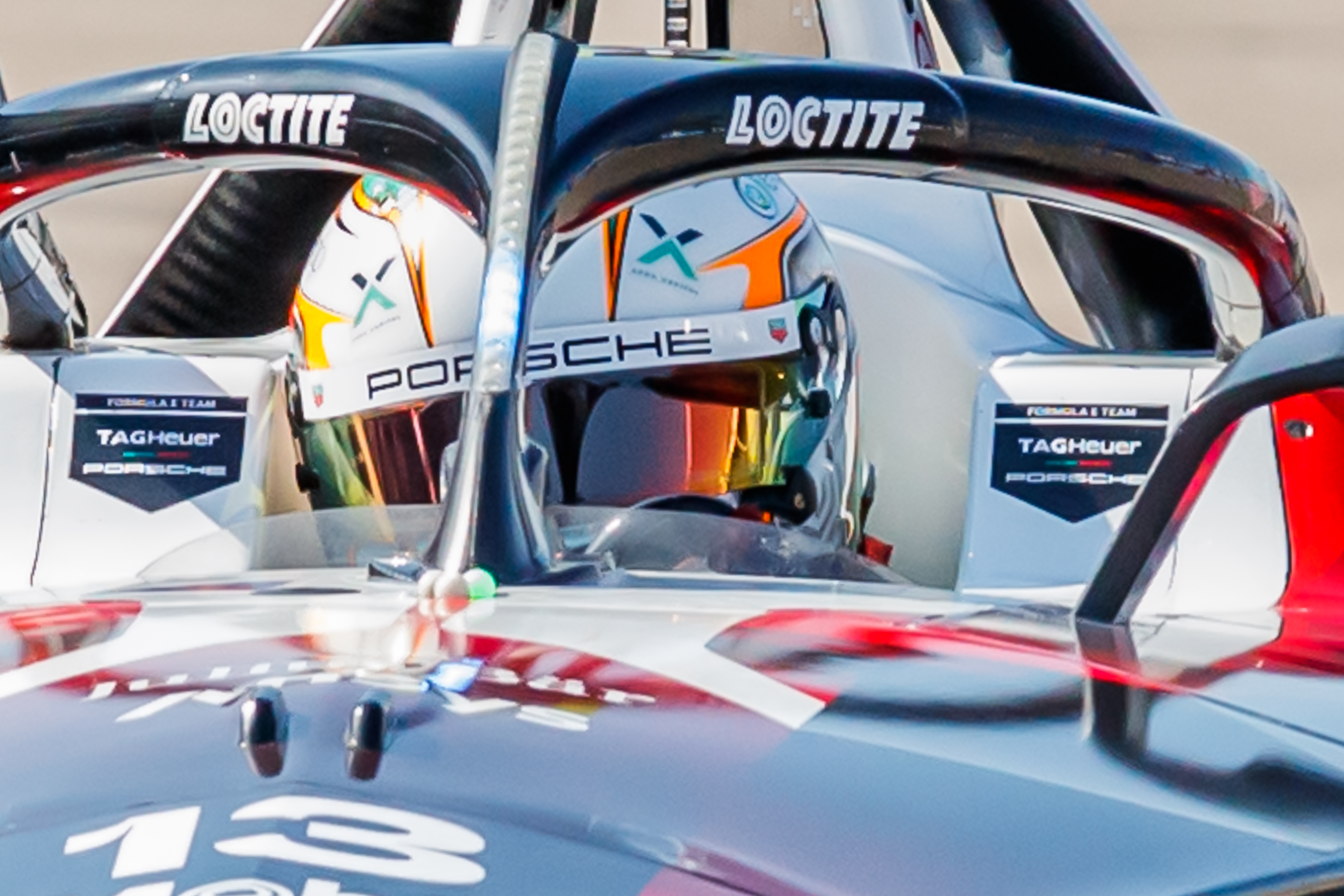
Close-up of a Gen3 driver.

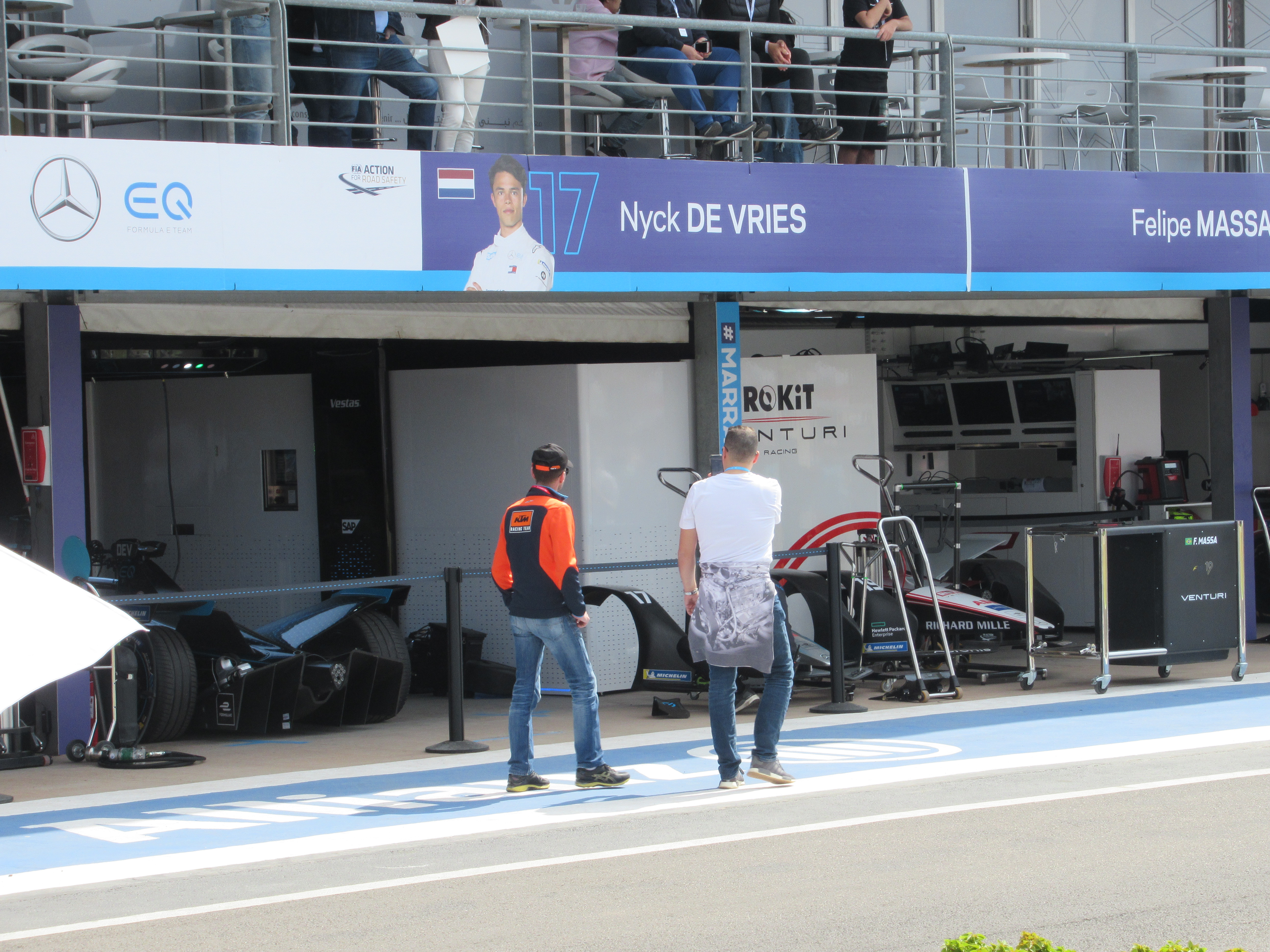
Team Mercedes-EQ pitbox.

== See also ==
- Electric motorsport
- List of Formula E drivers
- List of Formula E ePrix

Awards
Preceded by Nissan GT Academy	Autosport; Pioneering and Innovation Award; 2014	Succeeded by McLaren Applied Technologies
