= Virtually Live =

System for virtual participation in live events

Virtually Live is a patented media method and system that uses visualization technology and telemetry to enable a fan experience of virtually attending live events and interact with them across multiple devices and platforms, creating an immersive and socially interactive experience.

== Features ==
The Virtually Live media method and system allows for the real time visualization of live data for the purpose of producing a live CGI stream with very low latency. The inventors’ concept was to recreate live sporting and entertainment events in hyper-realistic scenery and allow users to participate in real time rather than just passively watch. Virtually Live is compatible with HTC Vive and Oculus Rift.

== Development and patents ==
Jamil El-Imad and Jesús Hormigo Cebolla conceived the Virtually Live method and system in 2008. Their idea was to create a media method that would take all the active elements of an event and transpose it in real time to a platform whereby people could feel a ‘sense of presence’ in the event. The media method would “capture all the telemetry and motion of an event, place it in a simulator, then bring the fans in to experience it.” Their technology was invented and patented globally from 2009 onwards.

In 2010, the European Patent Office granted patents across 38 designated states: Albania, Austria, Belgium, Bosnia & Herzegovina, Bulgaria, Switzerland/Liechtenstein, Cyprus, Czech Republic, Germany, Denmark, Estonia, Spain, Finland, France, the United Kingdom, Greece, Croatia, Hungary, Ireland, Iceland, Italy, Lithuania, Luxembourg, Latvia, Monaco, Macedonia, Malta, Netherlands, Norway, Poland, Portugal, Romania, Serbia, Sweden, Slovenia, Slovakia, and Turkey. In 2011, the patent was granted in South Africa. In 2012, patents were granted in Singapore and the USA.

== Applications in sports ==
In 2016, the first proof of concept was with the Scottish Professional Football League which used the platform to test a live football broadcast in virtual reality at Hampden Park in Glasgow during the showpiece national cup final.

In March 2016, motor racing became the next sport to use the Virtually Live media system. The Formula E used the Virtually Live media system to offer race fans an immersive, interactive racing experience. Formula E first tested the system at the Long Beach ePrix in California on April 2. In June, an app was made available for downloading to spectators who had an HTC Vive headset. Fans were able to choose from several viewing points around the circuit, opting to watch from the edge of the track, in the top level of hospitality room, or even within the car of their choice. The spectator could click on a car, and suddenly he or she would be sitting in the car, in the driver’s seat, going around the simulated track, in the actual race position of the car, or fans could just watch the live broadcast feed as a spectator.

In June 2018, the Formula E Championship management used the Virtually Live media system to create a gaming app to allow users to race against real Formula E drivers. The ghost racing app took real time telemetry data from actual Formula E races and fed it into the game so fans could drive alongside the real drivers as the race is going on. The app was launched in 2019.
