= List of Formula E driver records =

This is a list of driver records in the FIA Formula E Championship, since 2014–15. Drivers who have competed in the 2025–26 Formula E season are highlighted in bold.

This page is accurate up to the end of the 2026 London ePrix.

== Races entered and started ==
Drivers are considered to be "entered" into a race if they attempt to compete in at least one official practice session with the intent of entering the race. These drivers are noted on the "entry list" for that race. A driver is considered to have started a race if they line-up on the grid (or at the pitlane exit) for the start of a race

=== Total entries ===
	Driver	Seasons	Entries
1	(Brazil) **Lucas di Grassi**	2014/15 – 2025/26	165
2	(France) **Jean-Éric Vergne**	2014/15 – 2025/26	163
3	(Switzerland) **Sébastien Buemi**	2014/15 – 2025/26	161
3	(Portugal) **António Félix da Costa**	2014/15 – 2025/26	161
5	(United Kingdom) Sam Bird	2014/15 – 2024/25	144
5	(New Zealand) **Mitch Evans**	2016/17 – 2025/26	144
7	(Switzerland) **Edoardo Mortara**	2017/18 – 2025/26	129
8	(Netherlands) Robin Frijns	2015/16 – 2016/17, 2018/19 – 2024/25	119
9	(Germany) **Maximilian Günther**	2018/19 – 2025/26	117
10	(United Kingdom) **Oliver Rowland**	2015/16, 2018/19 – 2025/26	114

=== Total starts ===
	Driver	Seasons	Starts
1	(Brazil) **Lucas di Grassi**	2014/15 – 2025/26	164
2	(France) **Jean-Éric Vergne**	2014/15 – 2025/26	163
3	(Portugal) **António Félix da Costa**	2014/15 – 2025/26	161
4	(Switzerland) **Sébastien Buemi**	2014/15 – 2025/26	160
5	**(New Zealand) Mitch Evans**	2016/17 – 2025/26	142
6	(United Kingdom) Sam Bird	2014/15 – 2024/25	141
7	(Switzerland) **Edoardo Mortara**	2017/18 – 2025/26	128
8	(Netherlands) Robin Frijns	2015/16 – 2016/17, 2018/19 – 2024/25	117
9	(Germany) **Maximilian Günther**	2018/19 – 2025/26	116
10	(Germany) **Pascal Wehrlein**	2018/19 – 2025/26	113

=== Youngest drivers to start a race ===
	Driver	Age	Place	Race
1	(United Kingdom) **Taylor Barnard**	19 years, 332 days	14th	2024 Monaco ePrix
2	(Estonia) Paul Aron	20 years, 97 days	13th	2024 Berlin ePrix (R1)
3	(Spain) **Pepe Martí**	20 years, 176 days	Ret	2025 São Paulo ePrix
4	(United States) Matthew Brabham	20 years, 270 days	13th	2014 Putrajaya ePrix
5	(Barbados) **Zane Maloney**	21 years, 65 days	12th	2024 São Paulo ePrix (December)
6	(France) Pierre Gasly	21 years, 158 days	7th	2017 New York City ePrix (R1)
7	(Germany) **Maximilian Günther**	21 years, 166 days	16th	2018 Ad Diriyah ePrix
8	(Germany) Daniel Abt	21 years, 284 days	10th	2014 Beijing ePrix
9	(Brazil) Sérgio Sette Câmara	22 years, 74 days	DSQ	2020 Berlin ePrix (R1)
10	(Brazil) Caio Collet	22 years, 87 days	18th	2024 Portland ePrix (R1)

=== Oldest drivers to start a race ===
	Driver	Age	Place	Race
1	(Canada) Jacques Villeneuve	44 years, 238 days	11th	2015 Putrajaya ePrix
2	(France) Stéphane Sarrazin	42 years, 256 days	12th	2018 New York City ePrix (R2)
3	(Brazil) **Lucas di Grassi**	42 years, 5 days	Ret	2026 London ePrix (R2)
4	(Germany) André Lotterer	41 years, 253 days	21st	2023 London ePrix (R2)
5	(Germany) Nick Heidfeld	41 years, 67 days	8th	2018 New York City ePrix (R2)
6	(Italy) Jarno Trulli	40 years, 350 days	Ret	2015 London ePrix (R2)
7	(Spain) Oriol Servià	40 years, 181 days	9th	2015 Buenos Aires ePrix
8	(Switzerland) **Edoardo Mortara**	39 years, 216 days	3rd	2026 London ePrix (R2)
9	(Brazil) Felipe Massa	39 years, 110 days	16th	2020 Berlin ePrix (R6)
10	(United Kingdom) Sam Bird	38 years, 200 days	Ret	2025 London ePrix (R2)

=== Oldest drivers to enter a race ===
	Driver	Age	Place	Race
1	(Canada) Jacques Villeneuve	44 years, 280 days	DNS	2015 Punta del Este ePrix
2	(France) Stéphane Sarrazin	42 years, 256 days	12th	2018 New York City ePrix (R2)
3	(Brazil) **Lucas di Grassi**	42 years, 5 days	Ret	2026 London ePrix (R2)
4	(Germany) André Lotterer	41 years, 253 days	21st	2023 London ePrix (R2)
5	(Italy) Jarno Trulli	41 years, 117 days	DNP	2015 Putrajaya ePrix
6	(Germany) Nick Heidfeld	41 years, 67 days	8th	2018 New York City ePrix (R2)
7	(Spain) Oriol Servià	40 years, 181 days	9th	2015 Buenos Aires ePrix
8	(Switzerland) **Edoardo Mortara**	39 years, 216 days	3rd	2026 London ePrix (R2)
9	(Brazil) Felipe Massa	39 years, 110 days	16th	2020 Berlin ePrix (R6)
10	(United Kingdom) Sam Bird	38 years, 200 days	Ret	2025 London ePrix (R2)

=== Most consecutive race starts ===
Most consecutive races that the driver entered and actually started.

	Driver	Consecutive starts	Races
1	(France) **Jean-Éric Vergne**	163	**2014 Punta del Este ePrix – 2026 London ePrix (R2)**
2	(Portugal) **António Félix da Costa**	146	**2016 London ePrix – 2026 London ePrix (R2)**
3	(New Zealand) **Mitch Evans**	119	2016 Hong Kong ePrix – 2025 Tokyo ePrix (R1)
4	(Brazil) **Lucas di Grassi**	104	2014 Beijing ePrix – 2023 Hyderabad ePrix
5	(Belgium) Stoffel Vandoorne	103	2018 Ad Diriyah ePrix – 2025 London ePrix (R2)
6	(United Kingdom) Sam Bird	98	2014 Beijing ePrix – 2022 London ePrix (R2)
7	(New Zealand) **Nick Cassidy**	96	**2021 Diriyah ePrix – 2026 London ePrix (R2)**
7	(United Kingdom) **Jake Dennis**	96	**2021 Diriyah ePrix – 2026 London ePrix (R2)**
7	(Germany) **Pascal Wehrlein**	96	**2021 Diriyah ePrix – 2026 London ePrix (R2)**
10	(Switzerland) **Edoardo Mortara**	94	**2021 Rome ePrix – 2026 London ePrix (R2)**

=== Most consecutive race entries ===
	Driver	Consecutive Entries	Races
1	(Brazil) **Lucas di Grassi**	165	**2014 Beijing ePrix – 2026 London ePrix**
2	(France) **Jean-Éric Vergne**	163	**2014 Punta del Este ePrix – 2026 London ePrix**
3	(Portugal) **António Félix da Costa**	146	**2016 London ePrix – 2026 London ePrix**
4	(New Zealand) **Mitch Evans**	144	**2016 Hong Kong ePrix – 2026 London ePrix**
5	(Switzerland) **Edoardo Mortara**	120	**2018 Ad Diriyah ePrix – 2026 London ePrix**
6	(Germany) **Maximilian Günther**	114	**2019 Rome ePrix – 2026 London ePrix**
7	(Belgium) Stoffel Vandoorne	103	2018 Ad Diriyah ePrix – 2025 London ePrix (R2)
8	(United Kingdom) Sam Bird	98	2014 Beijing ePrix – 2022 London ePrix (R2)
9	(New Zealand) **Nick Cassidy**	96	**2021 Diriyah ePrix – 2026 London ePrix**
9	(United Kingdom) **Jake Dennis**	96	**2021 Diriyah ePrix – 2026 London ePrix**
9	(Germany) **Pascal Wehrlein**	96	**2021 Diriyah ePrix – 2026 London ePrix**

== Wins ==
=== Total wins ===
	Driver	Entries	Wins	Percentage
1	(New Zealand) **Mitch Evans**	144	16	11.11%
2	(Switzerland) **Sébastien Buemi**	161	14	8.70%
2	(Portugal) **António Félix da Costa**	163	14	8.59%
2	(Brazil) **Lucas di Grassi**	165	14	8.48%
5	(United Kingdom) Sam Bird	146	12	8.22%
5	(New Zealand) **Nick Cassidy**	96	12	12.50%
7	(France) **Jean-Éric Vergne**	163	11	6.75%
7	(Germany) **Pascal Wehrlein**	113	11	9.73%
9	(United Kingdom) **Oliver Rowland**	114	8	7.02%
9	(United Kingdom) **Jake Dennis**	96	8	8.33%

=== Percentage wins ===
	Driver	Entries	Wins	Percentage
1	(New Zealand) **Nick Cassidy**	96	12	12.50%
2	(Sweden) Felix Rosenqvist	25	3	12.00%
3	(New Zealand) **Mitch Evans**	144	16	11.11%
4	(Germany) **Pascal Wehrlein**	113	11	9.73%
5	(Switzerland) **Sébastien Buemi**	161	14	8.70%
6	(Portugal) **António Félix da Costa**	163	14	8.59%
7	(Brazil) **Lucas di Grassi**	165	14	8.48%
8	(United Kingdom) **Jake Dennis**	96	8	8.33%
9	(United Kingdom) Sam Bird	146	12	8.22%
10	(United Kingdom) **Oliver Rowland**	114	8	7.02%

=== Most wins in a season ===
	Driver	Seasons	Wins	Races	Percentage
1	(Switzerland) Sébastien Buemi	2016/17	6	12	50.00%
2	(France) **Jean-Éric Vergne**	2017/18	4	12	33.33%
2	(New Zealand) **Mitch Evans**	2021/22	4	16	25.00%
2	(Switzerland) **Edoardo Mortara**	2021/22	4	16	25.00%
2	(New Zealand) **Mitch Evans**	2022/23	4	16	25.00%
2	(New Zealand) **Nick Cassidy**	2022/23	4	16	25.00%
2	(Portugal) **António Félix da Costa**	2023/24	4	16	25.00%
2	(United Kingdom) **Oliver Rowland**	2024/25	4	16	25.00%
2	(New Zealand) **Nick Cassidy**	2024/25	4	16	25.00%
10	(Brazil) Lucas di Grassi	2015/16	3	10	30.00%
10	(Switzerland) Sébastien Buemi	2015/16	3	10	30.00%
10	(Switzerland) Sébastien Buemi	2014/15	3	11	27.27%
10	(Portugal) **António Félix da Costa**	2019/20	3	11	27.27%
10	(France) **Jean-Éric Vergne**	2018/19	3	13	23.08%
10	(Germany) **Pascal Wehrlein**	2022/23	3	16	18.75%
10	(Germany) **Pascal Wehrlein**	2023/24	3	16	18.75%
10	(Germany) **Pascal Wehrlein**	2025/26	3	17	17.65%

=== Highest percentage of wins in a season ===
	Driver	Seasons	Races	Wins	Percentage
1	(Switzerland) Sébastien Buemi	2016/17	12	6	50.00%
2	(France) **Jean-Éric Vergne**	2017/18	12	4	33.33%
3	(Brazil) Lucas di Grassi	2015/16	10	3	30.00%
3	(Switzerland) Sébastien Buemi	2015/16	10	3	30.00%
5	(Switzerland) Sébastien Buemi	2014/15	11	3	27.27%
5	(Portugal) **Antonio Felix da Costa**	2019/20	11	3	27.27%
7	(New Zealand) **Mitch Evans**	2021/22	16	4	25.00%
7	(Switzerland) **Edoardo Mortara**	2021/22	16	4	25.00%
7	(New Zealand) **Mitch Evans**	2022/23	16	4	25.00%
7	(New Zealand) **Nick Cassidy**	2022/23	16	4	25.00%
7	(Portugal) **Antonio Felix da Costa**	2023/24	16	4	25.00%
7	(United Kingdom) **Oliver Rowland**	2024/25	16	4	25.00%
7	(New Zealand) **Nick Cassidy**	2024/25	16	4	25.00%

=== Most consecutive wins ===
	Driver	Season(s)	Wins	Consecutive races won
1	(Switzerland) Sébastien Buemi	2016/17	3	Hong Kong, Marrakesh, Buenos Aires
1	(Portugal) **António Félix da Costa**	2019/20	3	Marrakesh, Berlin Race 1 & 2
1	(Portugal) **António Félix da Costa**	2023/24	3	Shanghai Race 2, Portland Race 1 & 2
1	(New Zealand) **Nick Cassidy**	2024/25	3	Berlin Race 2, London Race 1 & 2
5	(France) Nico Prost	2015/16	2	London Race 1 & 2
5	(Switzerland) Sébastien Buemi	2016/17	2	Monaco, Paris
5	(United Kingdom) Sam Bird	2016/17	2	New York City Race 1 & 2
5	(Sweden) Felix Rosenqvist	2017/18	2	Hong Kong Race 2, Marrakesh
5	(Brazil) Lucas di Grassi	2017/18	2	Zürich, New York City Race 1
5	(New Zealand) **Mitch Evans**	2021/22	2	Rome Race 1 & 2
5	(Germany) **Pascal Wehrlein**	2022/23	2	Diriyah Race 1 & 2
5	(New Zealand) **Mitch Evans**	2022/23	2	São Paulo, Berlin Race 1
5	(New Zealand) **Nick Cassidy**	2022/23	2	Berlin Race 2, Monaco
5	(Portugal) **António Félix da Costa**	2025/26	2	Jeddah Race 2, Madrid

=== Most consecutive wins from first race of season ===
	Driver	Season	Consecutive races won	Wins
1	(Switzerland) Sébastien Buemi	2016/17	3	Hong Kong, Marrakesh, Buenos Aires

=== Most wins in first championship season ===
	Driver	Seasons	Wins
1	(Switzerland) Sébastien Buemi	2014/15	3
2	(Brazil) Nelson Piquet Jr.	2014/15	2
2	(United Kingdom) Sam Bird	2014/15	2
2	(United Kingdom) **Jake Dennis**	2020/21	2
5	(Brazil) Lucas di Grassi	2014/15	1
5	(Belgium) Jérôme d'Ambrosio	2014/15	1
5	(France) Nico Prost	2014/15	1
5	(Portugal) **António Félix da Costa**	2014/15	1
5	(Sweden) Felix Rosenqvist	2016/17	1
5	**(France) Norman Nato**	2020/21	1

=== Fewest races before first win ===
	Entry	Driver	Race
1	1st race	(Brazil) Lucas di Grassi	2014 Beijing ePrix
2	2nd race	(United Kingdom) Sam Bird	2014 Putrajaya ePrix
3	3rd race	(Switzerland) Sébastien Buemi	2014 Punta del Este ePrix
3	3rd race	(Portugal) **António Félix da Costa**	2015 Buenos Aires ePrix
5	5th race	(France) Nico Prost	2015 Miami ePrix
6	6th race	(Brazil) Nelson Piquet Jr.	2015 Long Beach ePrix
6	6th race	(United Kingdom) **Jake Dennis**	2021 Valencia ePrix (R2)
8	7th race	(Sweden) Felix Rosenqvist	2017 Berlin ePrix (R1)
9	8th race	(Belgium) Jérôme d'Ambrosio	2015 Berlin ePrix
10	12th race	(Netherlands) **Nyck de Vries**	2021 Diriyah ePrix (R1)

=== Most races before first win ===
	Start	Driver	Race
1	69th race	(Switzerland) **Nico Müller**	2026 Berlin ePrix (R1)
2	60th race	(United Kingdom) **Dan Ticktum**	2025 Jakarta ePrix
3	40th race	(United Kingdom) Alex Lynn	2021 London ePrix (R2)
4	38th race	(Germany) Daniel Abt	2018 Mexico City ePrix
5	36th race	(United Kingdom) **Taylor Barnard**	2026 London ePrix (R2)
6	35th race	(Germany) **Pascal Wehrlein**	2022 Mexico City ePrix
7	31st race	(France) **Jean-Éric Vergne**	2017 Montreal ePrix (R2)
7	31st race	(New Zealand) **Mitch Evans**	2019 Rome ePrix
9	30th race	(Netherlands) Robin Frijns	2019 Paris ePrix
10	26th race	(New Zealand) **Nick Cassidy**	2022 New York City ePrix (R1)

=== Most races without a win ===
	Driver	Entries	Starts	Best Finish
1	(United Kingdom) Oliver Turvey	90	88	2nd
2	(Germany) André Lotterer	81	81	2nd
3	(Brazil) Sérgio Sette Câmara	71	68	4th
4	(United Kingdom) Jake Hughes	48	47	2nd
5	(Germany) Nick Heidfeld	44	44	3rd
6	(Germany) René Rast	38	38	2nd
7	(France) Stéphane Sarrazin	37	37	2nd
8	(Argentina) José María López	33	33	2nd
8	(France) Sacha Fenestraz	33	33	4th
8	(Barbados) **Zane Maloney**	33	33	10th

=== Most podiums without a win ===
	Driver	Entries	Starts	Podiums
1	(Germany) André Lotterer	81	81	8
1	(Germany) Nick Heidfeld	44	44	8
3	(Germany) René Rast	38	38	3
3	(France) Stéphane Sarrazin	37	37	3
5	(United Kingdom) Jake Hughes	48	47	2
5	(Argentina) José María López	33	33	2
5	(France) Loïc Duval	28	28	2
5	(Spain) **Pepe Martí**	17	17	2
9	(United Kingdom) Oliver Turvey	90	88	1
9	(Sweden) **Joel Eriksson**	27	27	1
9	(Brazil) Felipe Massa	24	24	1
9	(Brazil) Bruno Senna	21	21	1
9	(Brazil) **Felipe Drugovich**	19	19	1
9	(United States) Scott Speed	4	4	1
9	(France) Franck Montagny	2	2	1

=== Wins from furthest back on the start grid ===
	Driver	Race	Start pos.
1	(New Zealand) **Mitch Evans**	2024 São Paulo ePrix (December)	22nd
2	(New Zealand) **Nick Cassidy**	2025 Berlin ePrix (R2)	20th
3	(Brazil) **Lucas di Grassi**	2026 Shanghai ePrix (R2)	19th
4	(New Zealand) **Mitch Evans**	2026 Berlin ePrix (R2)	17th
5	(Brazil) **Lucas di Grassi**	2017 Mexico City ePrix	15th
6	(Belgium) Stoffel Vandoorne	2025 Tokyo ePrix (R1)	14th
7	(New Zealand) **Nick Cassidy**	2026 Mexico City ePrix	13th
8	(Brazil) **Lucas di Grassi**	2018 New York City ePrix (R1)	11th
8	(Portugal) **António Félix da Costa**	2023 Cape Town ePrix	11th
10	(Belgium) Jérôme d'Ambrosio	2019 Marrakesh ePrix	10th
10	(New Zealand) **Nick Cassidy**	2023 Portland ePrix	10th
10	(Portugal) **António Félix da Costa**	2024 Berlin ePrix (R2)	10th

=== Most wins at the same ePrix ===
	Driver	Wins	ePrix	Years
1	(New Zealand) **Mitch Evans**	4	Rome	2019, 2022 (R1), 2022 (R2), 2023 (R1)
2	(United Kingdom) Sam Bird	3	New York City	2017 (R1), 2017 (R2), 2021 (R2)
2	(Portugal) **António Félix da Costa**	3	Berlin	2020 (R1), 2020 (R2), 2024 (R2)
2	(Switzerland) **Sébastien Buemi**	3	Monaco	2015, 2017, 2025 (R2)
2	(New Zealand) **Nick Cassidy**	3	Berlin	2023 (R2), 2024 (R1), 2025 (R2)
2	(New Zealand) **Nick Cassidy**	3	London	2023 (R2), 2025 (R1), 2025 (R2)
2	(New Zealand) **Mitch Evans**	3	Berlin	2023 (R1), 2025 (R1), 2026 (R2)
8	(Switzerland) **Sébastien Buemi**	2	Punta del Este	2014, 2015
8	(France) Nico Prost	2	London	2016 (R1), 2016 (R2)
8	(Switzerland) **Sébastien Buemi**	2	Berlin	2016, 2017 (R2)
8	(Brazil) **Lucas di Grassi**	2	Mexico City	2017, 2019
8	(United Kingdom) Sam Bird	2	Diriyah	2019 (R1), 2021 (R2)
8	(Brazil) **Lucas di Grassi**	2	Berlin	2019, 2021 (R1)
8	(Netherlands) **Nyck de Vries**	2	Diriyah	2021 (R1), 2022 (R1)
8	(United Kingdom) **Jake Dennis**	2	London	2021 (R1), 2022 (R1)
8	(Germany) **Pascal Wehrlein**	2	Diriyah	2023 (R1), 2023 (R2)
8	(Germany) **Pascal Wehrlein**	2	Mexico City	2022, 2024
8	(Portugal) **António Félix da Costa**	2	Portland	2024 (R1), 2024 (R2)
8	(New Zealand) **Mitch Evans**	2	São Paulo	2023, 2024 (December)
8	(United Kingdom) **Oliver Rowland**	2	Monaco	2025 (R1), 2026 (R2)
8	(Germany) **Pascal Wehrlein**	2	London	2024 (R1), 2026 (R1)

=== Youngest winners ===
(only the first win for each driver is listed)

	Driver	Age	Race
1	(United Kingdom) **Taylor Barnard**	22 years, 76 days	2026 London ePrix (R2)
2	(Germany) **Maximilian Günther**	22 years, 200 days	2020 Santiago ePrix
3	(Portugal) **António Félix da Costa**	23 years, 132 days	2015 Buenos Aires ePrix
4	(New Zealand) **Mitch Evans**	24 years, 293 days	2019 Rome ePrix
5	(Germany) Daniel Abt	25 years, 90 days	2018 Mexico City ePrix
6	(Sweden) Felix Rosenqvist	25 years, 205 days	2017 Berlin ePrix (R1)
7	(United Kingdom) **Jake Dennis**	25 years, 313 days	2021 Valencia ePrix (R2)
8	(United Kingdom) **Dan Ticktum**	26 years, 13 days	2025 Jakarta ePrix
9	(Netherlands) **Nyck de Vries**	26 years, 20 days	2021 Diriyah ePrix (R1)
10	(Switzerland) **Sébastien Buemi**	26 years, 42 days	2014 Punta del Este ePrix

=== Oldest winners ===
(only the last win for each driver is listed)

	Driver	Age	Race
1	(Brazil) **Lucas di Grassi**	41 years, 328 days	2026 Shanghai ePrix (R2)
2	(United Kingdom) Sam Bird	37 years, 67 days	2024 São Paulo ePrix (March)
3	(Switzerland) **Sébastien Buemi**	36 years, 166 days	2025 Monaco ePrix (R2)
4	(Switzerland) **Edoardo Mortara**	35 years, 214 days	2022 Seoul ePrix (R2)
5	(France) Nico Prost	34 years, 319 days	2016 London ePrix (R2)
6	**(Portugal) António Félix da Costa**	34 years, 202 days	2026 Madrid ePrix
7	(Switzerland) **Nico Müller**	34 years, 66 days	2026 Berlin ePrix (R1)
8	(United Kingdom) **Oliver Rowland**	33 years, 280 days	2026 Monaco ePrix (R2)
9	(Belgium) Stoffel Vandoorne	33 years, 53 days	2025 Tokyo ePrix (R1)
10	(Belgium) Jerome d'Ambrosio	33 years, 16 days	2019 Marrakesh ePrix

=== Most wins by drivers that have not won a championship ===
	Driver	Entries	Wins
1	(New Zealand) **Mitch Evans**	144	16
2	(United Kingdom) Sam Bird	144	12
2	(New Zealand) **Nick Cassidy**	96	12
4	(Germany) **Maximilian Günther**	117	7
5	(Switzerland) **Edoardo Mortara**	129	6
6	(Belgium) Jerome d'Ambrosio	69	3
6	(France) Nico Prost	45	3
6	(Sweden) Felix Rosenqvist	25	3
9	(Netherlands) Robin Frijns	119	2
9	(Germany) Daniel Abt	69	2
9	(United Kingdom) **Dan Ticktum**	65	2

== Pole positions ==
Drivers are considered to take a pole position if they qualified in the first place, regardless of whether they started the race in the first place or not.

=== Total pole positions ===
	Driver	Entries	Poles	Percentage
1	(France) **Jean-Éric Vergne**	163	17	10.43%
1	(Switzerland) **Sébastien Buemi**	161	17	10.56%
3	(Germany) **Pascal Wehrlein**	113	13	11.50%
4	(United Kingdom) **Oliver Rowland**	114	11	9.65%
4	(New Zealand) **Mitch Evans**	144	11	7.64%
6	(United Kingdom) **Jake Dennis**	96	9	9.38%
7	(Belgium) Stoffel Vandoorne	103	8	7.77%
7	(Portugal) **António Félix da Costa**	161	8	4.97%
7	(New Zealand) **Nick Cassidy**	96	8	8.33%
10	(Switzerland) **Edoardo Mortara**	129	7	5.43%

=== Percentage pole positions ===
	Driver	Entries	Poles	Percentage
1	(Sweden) Felix Rosenqvist	25	6	24.00%
2	(Germany) **Pascal Wehrlein**	113	13	11.50%
3	(Switzerland) **Sébastien Buemi**	161	17	10.56%
4	(France) **Jean-Éric Vergne**	163	17	10.43%
5	(United Kingdom) **Oliver Rowland**	114	11	9.65%
6	(United Kingdom) **Jake Dennis**	96	9	9.38%
7	(New Zealand) **Nick Cassidy**	96	8	8.33%
7	(United Kingdom) Jake Hughes	48	4	8.33%
7	(Italy) Jarno Trulli	12	1	8.33%
10	(Belgium) Stoffel Vandoorne	103	8	7.77%

=== Most consecutive pole positions ===
	Driver	Poles	Season(s)	Races
1	(United Kingdom) Alexander Sims	3	2018/19, 2019/20	New York City, Diriyah
1	(Portugal) **António Félix da Costa**	3	2019/20	Marrakesh, Berlin (R1–R2)
1	(United Kingdom) **Oliver Rowland**	3	2024/25	Monaco (R2), Tokyo
4	(France) Nico Prost	2	2014/15	Beijing, Putrajaya
4	(Switzerland) **Sébastien Buemi**	2	2015/16	Beijing, Putrajaya
4	(United Kingdom) Sam Bird	2	2015/16	Long Beach, Paris
4	(Switzerland) **Sébastien Buemi**	2	2016/17	Monaco, Paris
4	(Switzerland) **Sébastien Buemi**	2	2017/18	New York City
4	(United Kingdom) **Oliver Rowland**	2	2018/19	Paris, Monaco
4	(Switzerland) **Edoardo Mortara**	2	2021/22	Berlin
4	(United Kingdom) **Jake Dennis**	2	2021/22	London
4	(Germany) **Maximilian Günther**	2	2022/23	Jakarta
4	(Germany) **Pascal Wehrlein**	2	2024/25	São Paulo, Mexico City
4	(Switzerland) **Edoardo Mortara**	2	2025/26	Jeddah
4	(United Kingdom) **Dan Ticktum**	2	2025/26	Monaco

=== Most pole positions in a season ===
	Driver	Season	Entries	Poles	Percentage
1	(France) **Jean-Éric Vergne**	2017/18	12	4	33.33%
1	(Switzerland) **Edoardo Mortara**	2025/26	17	4	23.53%
1	(Germany) **Pascal Wehrlein**	2025/26	17	4	23.53%
4	(France) **Jean-Éric Vergne**	2014/15	9	3	33.33%
4	(Switzerland) **Sébastien Buemi**	2015/16	10	3	30.00%
4	(United Kingdom) Sam Bird	2015/16	10	3	30.00%
4	(Switzerland) **Sébastien Buemi**	2014/15	11	3	27.27%
4	(Portugal) **António Félix da Costa**	2019/20	11	3	27.27%
4	(Brazil) **Lucas di Grassi**	2016/17	12	3	25.00%
4	(Sweden) Felix Rosenqvist	2016/17	12	3	25.00%
4	(Sweden) Felix Rosenqvist	2017/18	12	3	25.00%
4	(Switzerland) **Sébastien Buemi**	2017/18	12	3	25.00%
4	(United Kingdom) **Oliver Rowland**	2018/19	13	3	23.08%
4	(Switzerland) **Sébastien Buemi**	2018/19	13	3	23.08%
4	(Belgium) Stoffel Vandoorne	2020/21	15	3	20.00%
4	(New Zealand) **Mitch Evans**	2022/23	16	3	18.75%
4	(Germany) **Pascal Wehrlein**	2023/24	16	3	18.75%
4	(France) **Jean-Éric Vergne**	2023/24	16	3	18.75%
4	(New Zealand) **Mitch Evans**	2023/24	16	3	18.75%
4	(United Kingdom) **Oliver Rowland**	2024/25	16	3	18.75%
4	(Germany) **Pascal Wehrlein**	2024/25	16	3	18.75%

=== Highest percentage of pole positions in a season ===
	Driver	Season	Season races	Poles	Percentage
1	(France) **Jean-Éric Vergne**	2017/18	12	4	33.33%
2	(Switzerland) **Sébastien Buemi**	2015/16	10	3	30.00%
2	(United Kingdom) Sam Bird	2015/16	10	3	30.00%
4	(France) **Jean-Éric Vergne**	2014/15	11	3	27.27%
4	(Switzerland) **Sébastien Buemi**	2014/15	11	3	27.27%
4	(Portugal) **António Félix da Costa**	2019/20	11	3	27.27%
7	(Brazil) **Lucas di Grassi**	2016/17	12	3	25.00%
7	(Sweden) Felix Rosenqvist	2016/17	12	3	25.00%
7	(Sweden) Felix Rosenqvist	2017/18	12	3	25.00%
7	(Switzerland) **Sébastien Buemi**	2017/18	12	3	25.00%

=== Most pole positions at the same ePrix ===
	Driver	Poles	ePrix	Years
1	(France) **Jean-Éric Vergne**	4	Berlin	2016, 2020 (R3), 2020 (R4), 2021 (R1)
1	(Germany) **Pascal Wehrlein**	4	Mexico City	2019, 2022, 2024, 2025
1	(Switzerland) **Edoardo Mortara**	4	Berlin	2022 (R1), 2022 (R2), 2024 (R1), 2026 (R1)
4	(Switzerland) **Sébastien Buemi**	3	New York City	2018 (R1), 2018 (R2), 2019 (R1)
4	(United Kingdom) **Oliver Rowland**	3	Tokyo	2024, 2025 (R1), 2025 (R2)
4	(New Zealand) **Mitch Evans**	3	London	2023 (R1), 2024 (R1), 2025 (R1)
4	(Germany) **Pascal Wehrlein**	3	São Paulo	2024 (March), 2024 (December), 2025
8	(Switzerland) **Sébastien Buemi**	2	London	2015 (R1), 2016 (R2)
8	(Switzerland) **Sébastien Buemi**	2	Monaco	2015, 2017
8	(United Kingdom) Alexander Sims	2	Diriyah	2019 (R1), 2019 (R2)
8	(Portugal) **António Félix da Costa**	2	Berlin	2020 (R1), 2020 (R2)
8	(Belgium) Stoffel Vandoorne	2	Rome	2021 (R1), 2022 (R1)
8	(United Kingdom) **Jake Dennis**	2	London	2022 (R1), 2022 (R2)
8	(Switzerland) **Sébastien Buemi**	2	Berlin	2019, 2023 (R1)
8	(Germany) **Maximilian Günther**	2	Jakarta	2023 (R1), 2023 (R2)
8	(New Zealand) **Nick Cassidy**	2	London	2023 (R2), 2024 (R2)
8	(United Kingdom) **Oliver Rowland**	2	Monaco	2019, 2025 (R2)
8	(Switzerland) **Edoardo Mortara**	2	Jeddah	2026 (R1), 2026 (R2)
8	(United Kingdom) **Dan Ticktum**	2	Monaco	2026 (R1), 2026 (R2)

=== Youngest polesitters ===
(only the first pole position for each driver is listed)

	Driver	Age	Race
1	(United Kingdom) **Taylor Barnard**	20 years, 259 days	2025 Jeddah ePrix (R2)
2	(Germany) Daniel Abt	22 years, 112 days	2015 Long Beach ePrix
3	(France) Sacha Fenestraz	23 years, 212 days	2023 Cape Town ePrix
4	(United Kingdom) Alex Lynn	23 years, 301 days	2017 New York City ePrix (R1)
5	(New Zealand) **Mitch Evans**	23 years, 351 days	2018 Zürich ePrix
6	(Germany) **Pascal Wehrlein**	24 years, 121 days	2019 Mexico City ePrix
7	(France) **Jean-Éric Vergne**	24 years, 233 days	2014 Punta del Este ePrix
8	(Sweden) Felix Rosenqvist	25 years, 6 days	2016 Marrakesh ePrix
9	(United Kingdom) **Jake Dennis**	25 years, 313 days	2021 Valencia ePrix (R2)
10	(Germany) **Maximilian Günther**	25 years, 336 days	2023 Jakarta ePrix (R1)

=== Oldest polesitters ===
(only the last pole position for each driver is listed)

	Driver	Age	Race
1	(Italy) Jarno Trulli	40 years, 314 days	2015 Berlin ePrix
2	(France) Stéphane Sarrazin	39 years, 238 days	2015 London ePrix (R2)
3	(Switzerland) **Edoardo Mortara**	39 years, 195 days	2026 Tokyo ePrix (R2)
4	(Brazil) **Lucas di Grassi**	38 years, 156 days	2023 Mexico City ePrix
5	(Germany) André Lotterer	38 years, 88 days	2020 Mexico City ePrix
6	(Switzerland) **Sébastien Buemi**	37 years, 71 days	2026 Mexico City ePrix
7	(France) Nico Prost	34 years, 314 days	2016 London ePrix (R1)
8	(United Kingdom) Sam Bird	34 years, 183 days	2021 New York City ePrix (R2)
9	(France) **Jean-Éric Vergne**	34 years, 66 days	2024 Portland ePrix (R2)
10	(Switzerland) **Nico Müller**	33 years, 340 days	2026 Miami ePrix

=== Most races without a pole position ===
	Driver	Entries	Starts
1	(Brazil) Sérgio Sette Câmara	71	68
2	(Germany) Nick Heidfeld	44	44
3	(Germany) René Rast	38	38
4	(Argentina) José María López	33	33
4	(Barbados) **Zane Maloney**	33	33
6	(France) Loic Duval	28	28
7	(Sweden) **Joel Eriksson**	27	27
8	(Brazil) Felipe Massa	24	24
9	(Germany) Maro Engel	23	23
9	(France) Tom Dillmann	23	23
9	(United Kingdom) Tom Blomqvist	23	23

== Fastest laps ==
Drivers are considered to take a fastest lap if they set the actual fastest lap time of the race, regardless of whether taking the extra point(s) or not

=== Total fastest laps ===
	Driver	Entries	Fastest laps	Percentage
1	(United Kingdom) **Jake Dennis**	96	13	13.54%
2	(Brazil) **Lucas di Grassi**	165	12	7.27%
2	(United Kingdom) Sam Bird	144	12	8.33%
4	(Switzerland) **Sébastien Buemi**	161	10	6.21%
4	(New Zealand) **Nick Cassidy**	96	10	10.42%
6	(New Zealand) **Mitch Evans**	144	8	5.56%
7	(Germany) Daniel Abt	69	7	10.14%
7	(Germany) **Pascal Wehrlein**	113	7	6.19%
7	(France) **Jean-Éric Vergne**	163	7	4.29%
7	(United Kingdom) **Oliver Rowland**	114	7	6.14%

=== Percentage fastest laps ===
	Driver	Entries	Fastest laps	Percentage
1	(Japan) Takuma Sato	1	1	100.00%
2	(United Kingdom) **Jake Dennis**	96	13	13.54%
3	(Sweden) Felix Rosenqvist	25	3	12.00%
4	(Spain) Jaime Alguersuari	9	1	11.11%
5	(New Zealand) **Nick Cassidy**	96	10	10.42%
6	(Germany) Daniel Abt	69	7	10.14%
7	(Germany) Maro Engel	23	2	8.69%
8	(United Kingdom) Sam Bird	144	12	8.33%
9	(Germany) René Rast	38	3	7.89%
10	(Brazil) Nelson Piquet Jr.	51	4	7.84%

=== Most consecutive fastest laps ===
	Driver	Fastest laps	Season(s)	Races
1	(Switzerland) **Sébastien Buemi**	3	2015/16	Beijing-Punta del Este
2	(United Kingdom) Sam Bird	2	2016/17	Monaco-Paris
2	(Germany) Maro Engel	2	2016/17	Berlin Race 2-New York City Race 1
2	(France) **Jean-Éric Vergne**	2	2018/19	Sanya-Rome
2	(Brazil) **Lucas di Grassi**	2	2021/22	Mexico City-Rome Race 1
2	(Netherlands) Robin Frijns	2	2021/22	Rome Race 2-Monaco
2	(Switzerland) **Edoardo Mortara**	2	2021/22	New York City Race 1 & 2
2	(United Kingdom) **Jake Dennis**	2	2023/24	Diriyah Race 1 & 2
2	(France) **Norman Nato**	2	2023/24	Berlin Race 1 & 2

=== Most fastest laps in a season ===
	Driver	Season	Entries	Fastest laps	Percentage
1	(Switzerland) **Sébastien Buemi**	2015/16	10	5	50.00%
1	(United Kingdom) **Jake Dennis**	2022/23	16	5	31.25%
1	(New Zealand) **Nick Cassidy**	2024/25	16	5	31.25%
4	(Brazil) **Lucas di Grassi**	2021/22	16	4	25.00%
4	(New Zealand) **Nick Cassidy**	2021/22	16	4	25.00%
4	(United Kingdom) **Oliver Rowland**	2025/26	17	4	23.53%
7	(Brazil) **Lucas di Grassi**	2017/18	12	3	25.00%
7	(Germany) Daniel Abt	2017/18	12	3	25.00%
7	(France) **Jean-Éric Vergne**	2018/19	13	3	23.08%
7	(New Zealand) **Mitch Evans**	2020/21	15	3	20.00%
7	(United Kingdom) **Jake Dennis**	2023/24	16	3	18.75%
7	(France) **Norman Nato**	2023/24	16	3	18.75%
7	(Germany) **Pascal Wehrlein**	2024/25	16	3	18.75%
7	(United Kingdom) **Jake Dennis**	2025/26	17	3	17.65%
7	(United Kingdom) **Dan Ticktum**	2025/26	17	3	17.65%

=== Highest percentage of fastest laps in a season ===
	Driver	Season	Season races	Fastest laps	Percentage
1	(Switzerland) **Sébastien Buemi**	2015/16	10	5	50.00%
2	(United Kingdom) **Jake Dennis**	2022/23	16	5	31.25%
2	(New Zealand) **Nick Cassidy**	2024/25	16	5	31.25%
4	(Brazil) **Lucas di Grassi**	2021/22	16	4	25.00%
4	(New Zealand) **Nick Cassidy**	2021/22	16	4	25.00%
4	(Brazil) **Lucas di Grassi**	2017/18	12	3	25.00%
4	(Germany) Daniel Abt	2017/18	12	3	25.00%
8	(United Kingdom) **Oliver Rowland**	2025/26	17	4	23.53%
9	(France) **Jean-Eric Vergne**	2018/19	13	3	23.08%
10	(New Zealand) **Mitch Evans**	2020/21	15	3	20.00%

=== Youngest drivers to set fastest lap ===
(only the first fastest lap for each driver is listed)

	Driver	Age	Race
1	(United Kingdom) **Taylor Barnard**	21 years, 55 days	2025 London ePrix (R1)
2	(Germany) Daniel Abt	22 years, 10 days	2014 Punta del Este ePrix
3	(New Zealand) **Mitch Evans**	22 years, 352 days	2017 Berlin ePrix (R1)
4	(Germany) **Pascal Wehrlein**	24 years, 121 days	2019 Mexico City ePrix
5	(Germany) David Beckmann	24 years, 224 days	2024 São Paulo ePrix (December)
6	(Spain) Jaime Alguersuari	24 years, 244 days	2014 Putrajaya ePrix
7	(Sweden) Felix Rosenqvist	24 years, 336 days	2016 Hong Kong ePrix
8	(France) **Jean-Éric Vergne**	25 years, 14 days	2015 Monaco ePrix
9	(India) Jehan Daruvala	25 years, 209 days	2024 Monaco ePrix
10	(United Kingdom) **Dan Ticktum**	25 years, 331 days	2025 Monaco ePrix (R2)

=== Oldest drivers to set fastest lap ===
(only the last fastest lap for each driver is listed)

	Driver	Age	Race
1	(Germany) André Lotterer	41 years, 252 days	2023 London ePrix (R1)
2	(Switzerland) **Edoardo Mortara**	39 years, 158 days	2026 Shanghai ePrix (R1)
3	(Germany) Nick Heidfeld	38 years, 343 days	2016 Paris ePrix
4	(United Kingdom) Sam Bird	38 years, 129 days	2025 Tokyo ePrix (R2)
5	(Brazil) **Lucas di Grassi**	37 years, 277 days	2022 Berlin ePrix (R1)
6	(Japan) Takuma Sato	37 years, 228 days	2014 Beijing ePrix
7	(Germany) René Rast	36 years, 93 days	2023 Diriyah ePrix (R1)
8	(Switzerland) **Sébastien Buemi**	36 years, 72 days	2025 Mexico City ePrix
9	(France) **Jean-Éric Vergne**	36 years, 22 days	2026 Monaco ePrix (R2)
10	(France) Nico Prost	35 years, 346 days	2017 Montreal ePrix (R2)

=== Most races without a fastest lap ===
	Driver	Entries	Starts
1	(United Kingdom) Oliver Turvey	90	88
2	(Brazil) Sérgio Sette Câmara	71	68
3	(United Kingdom) Alex Lynn	42	42
4	(France) Stéphane Sarrazin	37	37
5	(France) Sacha Fenestraz	33	33
5	(Barbados) **Zane Maloney**	33	33
7	(Sweden) **Joel Eriksson**	27	27
8	(Brazil) Felipe Massa	24	24
9	(France) Tom Dillmann	23	23
9	(United Kingdom) Tom Blomqvist	23	23

== Podium finishes ==
=== Total podium finishes ===
	Driver	Entries	Podiums	Percentage
1	(Brazil) **Lucas di Grassi**	165	42	25.45%
2	(France) **Jean-Éric Vergne**	163	39	23.93%
3	(New Zealand) **Mitch Evans**	144	38	26.39%
4	(Switzerland) **Sébastien Buemi**	161	36	22.36%
5	(Portugal) **António Félix da Costa**	161	32	19.88%
6	(New Zealand) **Nick Cassidy**	96	30	31.25%
7	(United Kingdom) **Jake Dennis**	96	29	30.21%
8	(United Kingdom) Sam Bird	144	27	18.75%
9	(United Kingdom) **Oliver Rowland**	114	26	22.81%
10	(Germany) **Pascal Wehrlein**	113	24	21.24%

=== Percentage podium finishes ===
	Driver	Entries	Podiums	Percentage
1	(France) Franck Montagny	2	1	50.00%
2	(New Zealand) **Nick Cassidy**	96	30	31.25%
3	(United Kingdom) **Jake Dennis**	96	29	30.21%
4	(Sweden) Felix Rosenqvist	25	7	28.00%
5	(New Zealand) **Mitch Evans**	144	38	26.39%
6	(Brazil) **Lucas di Grassi**	165	42	25.45%
7	(United States) Scott Speed	4	1	25.00%
8	(France) **Jean-Éric Vergne**	163	39	23.93%
9	(United Kingdom) **Oliver Rowland**	113	26	22.81%
10	(Switzerland) **Sébastien Buemi**	161	36	22.36%

=== Most podium finishes in a season ===
	Driver	Season	Races	Podiums	Percentage
1	(United Kingdom) **Jake Dennis**	2022/23	16	11	68.75%
2	(Belgium) Stoffel Vandoorne	2021/22	16	8	50.00%
2	(New Zealand) **Nick Cassidy**	2022/23	16	8	50.00%
2	(New Zealand) **Nick Cassidy**	2023/24	16	8	50.00%
5	(Brazil) **Lucas di Grassi**	2015/16	10	7	70.00%
5	(Brazil) **Lucas di Grassi**	2016/17	12	7	58.33%
5	(Brazil) **Lucas di Grassi**	2017/18	12	7	58.33%
5	(New Zealand) **Mitch Evans**	2021/22	16	7	43.75%
5	(New Zealand) **Mitch Evans**	2022/23	16	7	43.75%
5	(United Kingdom) **Oliver Rowland**	2023/24	16	7	43.75%
5	(United Kingdom) **Oliver Rowland**	2024/25	16	7	43.75%

=== Most consecutive podium finishes ===
	Driver	Podiums	Season	Races
1	(Brazil) **Lucas di Grassi**	7	2017/18	Punta del Este–New York City (R2)
2	(Portugal) **António Félix da Costa**	5	2019/20	Santiago–Berlin (R2)
2	(United Kingdom) **Jake Dennis**	5	2022/23	Berlin (R2)–Portland
2	(New Zealand) **Nick Cassidy**	5	2023/24	Misano (R2)–Shanghai (R1)
2	(New Zealand) **Nick Cassidy**	5	2024/25–2025/26	Berlin (R2)–Mexico City
6	(Brazil) **Lucas di Grassi**	4	2015/16	Beijing–Buenos Aires
6	(Switzerland) **Sébastien Buemi**	4	2018/19	Berlin–New York City (R2)
6	(Switzerland) **Edoardo Mortara**	4	2021/22	Berlin–Marrakesh
6	(United Kingdom) **Jake Dennis**	4	2021/22–2022/23	Seoul (R2)–Diriyah (R2)
6	(New Zealand) **Nick Cassidy**	4	2022/23–2023/24	London (R2)–Diriyah (R2)
6	(United Kingdom) **Oliver Rowland**	4	2023/24	Diriyah (R2)–Misano (R1)
6	(New Zealand) **Mitch Evans**	4	2023/24–2024/25	Portland (R2)–São Paulo (December)
6	(United Kingdom) **Oliver Rowland**	4	2024/25	Monaco (R1)–Tokyo (R2)

=== Most consecutive podium finishes from first race of season ===
	Driver	Podiums	Season	Races
1	(Brazil) **Lucas di Grassi**	4	2015/16	Beijing – Buenos Aires
2	(Brazil) **Lucas di Grassi**	3	2014/15	Beijing – Punta del Este
2	(Switzerland) **Sebastian Buemi**	3	2016/17	Hong Kong – Buenos Aires
2	(United Kingdom) **Jake Dennis**	3	2022/23	Mexico City–Diriyah (R2)
2	(Germany) **Pascal Wehrlein**	3	2022/23	Mexico City–Diriyah (R2)
2	(New Zealand) **Nick Cassidy**	3	2023/24	Mexico City–Diriyah (R2)
7	(United Kingdom) Sam Bird	2	2014/15	Beijing – Putrajaya
7	(Belgium) Jérôme d'Ambrosio	2	2018/19	Ad Diriyah – Marrakesh
7	(Belgium) Stoffel Vandoorne	2	2019/20	Diriyah (R1) - Diriyah (R2)
7	(Portugal) **António Félix da Costa**	2	2024/25	São Paulo - Mexico City
7	(New Zealand) **Nick Cassidy**	2	2025/26	São Paulo - Mexico City
7	(United Kingdom) **Oliver Rowland**	2	2025/26	São Paulo - Mexico City

=== Youngest drivers to score a podium finish ===
(only the first podium finish for each driver is listed)

	Driver	Age	Place	Race
1	(United Kingdom) **Taylor Barnard**	20 years, 190 days	3rd	2024 São Paulo ePrix (December)
2	(Spain) **Pepe Martí**	20 years, 337 days	3rd	2026 Monaco ePrix (R1)
3	(Germany) Daniel Abt	22 years, 101 days	3rd	2015 Miami ePrix
4	(Germany) **Maximilian Günther**	22 years, 200 days	1st	2020 Santiago ePrix
5	(Portugal) **António Félix da Costa**	23 years, 132 days	1st	2015 Buenos Aires ePrix
6	(New Zealand) **Mitch Evans**	23 years, 168 days	3rd	2017 Hong Kong ePrix
7	(Netherlands) Robin Frijns	24 years, 92 days	3rd	2015 Putrajaya ePrix
8	(France) **Jean-Éric Vergne**	24 years, 344 days	2nd	2015 Long Beach ePrix
9	(Sweden) Felix Rosenqvist	25 years, 6 days	3rd	2016 Marrakesh ePrix
10	(Netherlands) **Nyck de Vries**	25 years, 189 days	2nd	2020 Berlin ePrix (R6)

=== Oldest drivers to score a podium finish ===
(only the last podium finish for each driver is listed)

	Driver	Age	Place	Race
1	(Brazil) **Lucas di Grassi**	41 years, 328 days	1st	2026 Shanghai ePrix (R2)
2	(France) Stéphane Sarrazin	41 years, 270 days	3rd	2017 Montreal ePrix (R1)
3	(Germany) Nick Heidfeld	40 years, 227 days	3rd	2017 Hong Kong ePrix (R1)
4	(Germany) André Lotterer	40 years, 85 days	2nd	2022 Mexico City ePrix
5	(Switzerland) **Edoardo Mortara**	39 years, 216 days	3rd	2026 London ePrix (R2)
6	(Brazil) Felipe Massa	38 years, 16 days	3rd	2019 Monaco ePrix
7	(Switzerland) **Sébastien Buemi**	37 years, 106 days	2nd	2026 Jeddah ePrix (R2)
8	(United Kingdom) Sam Bird	37 years, 67 days	1st	2024 São Paulo ePrix (March)
9	(France) Franck Montagny	36 years, 251 days	2nd	2014 Beijing ePrix
10	(Germany) René Rast	36 years, 94 days	3rd	2023 Diriyah ePrix (R2)

=== Most races without a podium ===
	Driver	Seasons	Entries	Starts	Best result
1	(Brazil) Sérgio Sette Câmara	2019/20 – 2024/25	71	68	4th
2	(France) Sacha Fenestraz	2021/22 – 2023/24	33	33	4th
2	(Barbados) **Zane Maloney**	2024/25 – 2025/26	33	33	10th
4	(Germany) Maro Engel	2016/17 – 2017/18	23	23	4th
4	(France) Tom Dillmann	2016/17 – 2018/19	23	23	4th
4	(United Kingdom) Tom Blomqvist	2017/18, 2019/20 – 2020/21	23	23	8th
7	(Germany) David Beckmann	2022/23, 2024/25	18	18	10th
8	(United States) Oliver Askew	2021/22	16	16	4th
8	(India) Jehan Daruvala	2023/24	16	16	7th
10	(Italy) Antonio Giovinazzi	2021/22	16	15	16th

=== Most career podiums without a championship ===
	Driver	Entries	Wins	Podiums
1	(New Zealand) **Mitch Evans**	144	16	38
2	(New Zealand) **Nick Cassidy**	96	12	30
3	(United Kingdom) Sam Bird	144	12	27
4	(Switzerland) **Edoardo Mortara**	129	6	18
5	(Netherlands) Robin Frijns	119	2	16
6	(Germany) **Maximilian Günther**	117	7	12
7	(Germany) Daniel Abt	69	2	10
8	(Belgium) Jérôme d'Ambrosio	69	3	9
9	(Germany) Nick Heidfeld	44	0	8
9	(Germany) André Lotterer	81	0	8

=== Most races before scoring a podium finish ===
	Entry	Driver	Race
1	57th race	(United Kingdom) **Dan Ticktum**	2025 Tokyo ePrix (R2)
2	33rd race	(United Kingdom) Alex Lynn	2021 Valencia ePrix (R2)
3	29th race	(United Kingdom) Oliver Turvey	2018 Mexico City ePrix
4	28th race	(United Kingdom) Jake Hughes	2024 Shanghai ePrix (R2)
5	23rd race	(Sweden) **Joel Eriksson**	2026 Shanghai ePrix (R2)
6	20th race	(Brazil) Bruno Senna	2016 London ePrix (R1)
7	17th race	(France) Stephane Sarrazin	2016 Long Beach ePrix
8	16th race	(Switzerland) **Nico Müller**	2021 Valencia ePrix (R1)
9	15th race	**(France) Norman Nato**	2021 Berlin ePrix (R2)
10	14th race	(New Zealand) **Mitch Evans**	2017 Hong Kong ePrix (R2)

== Points ==
=== Career points ===
	Driver	Points	Entries
1	(France) **Jean-Éric Vergne**	1299	163
2	(Switzerland) **Sébastien Buemi**	1172	161
3	(New Zealand) **Mitch Evans**	1159	144
4	(Brazil) **Lucas di Grassi**	1109	165
5	(Portugal) **António Félix da Costa**	1040	161
6	(United Kingdom) Sam Bird	916	144
7	(Germany) **Pascal Wehrlein**	883	113
8	(United Kingdom) **Jake Dennis**	825	96
9	(New Zealand) **Nick Cassidy**	786	96
10	(United Kingdom) **Oliver Rowland**	749	114

=== Total races scoring points ===
This includes points for pole position and/or fastest lap.

	Driver	With points
1	(France) **Jean-Éric Vergne**	112
2	(Switzerland) **Sébastien Buemi**	101
3	(New Zealand) **Mitch Evans**	94
4	(Brazil) **Lucas di Grassi**	91
5	(Portugal) **António Félix da Costa**	89
6	(United Kingdom) Sam Bird	81
7	(Germany) **Pascal Wehrlein**	78
8	(Belgium) Stoffel Vandoorne	66
9	(United Kingdom) **Jake Dennis**	63
10	(Switzerland) **Edoardo Mortara**	63

=== Most consecutive races with points ===
	Driver	With points	Races
1	(Switzerland) **Sébastien Buemi**	22	2015 Long Beach ePrix – 2017 Paris ePrix
2	(France) **Jean-Éric Vergne**	20	2017 Berlin ePrix – 2019 Marrakesh ePrix
3	(France) Nico Prost	18	2016 Paris ePrix – 2017 Hong Kong ePrix
4	(Germany) **Pascal Wehrlein**	16	2023 São Paulo ePrix – 2024 Tokyo ePrix
5	(Belgium) Stoffel Vandoorne	14	2022 Rome ePrix – 2023 Mexico City ePrix
6	(France) Stéphane Sarrazin	13	2015 London ePrix – 2016 Hong Kong ePrix
6	(United Kingdom) Sam Bird	13	2017 Mexico City ePrix – 2018 Santiago ePrix
8	(France) Nico Prost	11	2014 Beijing ePrix – 2015 London ePrix
8	(United Kingdom) **Jake Dennis**	11	2022 Jakarta ePrix – 2023 Diriyah ePrix (R2)
8	(United Kingdom) **Jake Dennis**	11	2023 Berlin ePrix (R2) – 2024 Diriyah ePrix (R1)

=== Most consecutive points scored ===
	Driver	Points scored	Races
1	(Switzerland) **Sébastien Buemi**	388	2015 Long Beach ePrix–2017 Paris ePrix
2	(France) **Jean-Éric Vergne**	303	2017 Berlin ePrix (R1)–2019 Marrakesh ePrix
3	(United Kingdom) **Jake Dennis**	195	2023 Berlin ePrix (R2)–2024 Diriyah ePrix (R1)
4	(Belgium) Stoffel Vandoorne	186	2022 Rome ePrix–2023 Mexico City ePrix
5	(France) Nico Prost	176	2016 Paris ePrix–2017 Hong Kong ePrix (R2)
6	(United Kingdom) **Oliver Rowland**	171	2025 Mexico City ePrix–2025 Shanghai ePrix (R1)
7	(United Kingdom) Sam Bird	165	2017 Mexico City ePrix–2018 Santiago ePrix
7	(New Zealand) **Mitch Evans**	165	2024 Monaco ePrix–2024 São Paulo ePrix (December)
9	(New Zealand) **Nick Cassidy**	163	2025 Shanghai ePrix (R2)–2026 Mexico City ePrix
10	(United Kingdom) **Jake Dennis**	160	2022 Jakarta ePrix–2023 Diriyah ePrix (R2)

=== Most points in a season ===
	Driver	Points	Season	Championship Position	Races	% of max points possible
1	(United Kingdom) **Jake Dennis**	229	2022/23	1st	16	49.35%
2	(Belgium) Stoffel Vandoorne	213	2021/22	1st	16	45.91%
3	(New Zealand) **Nick Cassidy**	199	2022/23	2nd	16	42.89%
4	(France) **Jean-Éric Vergne**	198	2017/18	1st	12	56.89%
4	(Germany) **Pascal Wehrlein**	198	2023/24	1st	16	42.67%
6	(New Zealand) **Mitch Evans**	197	2022/23	3rd	16	42.46%
7	(New Zealand) **Mitch Evans**	192	2023/24	2nd	16	41.38%
8	(United Kingdom) **Oliver Rowland**	184	2024/25	1st	16	40.44%
9	(Brazil) **Lucas di Grassi**	181	2016/17	1st	12	52.01%
10	(New Zealand) **Mitch Evans**	180	2021/22	2nd	16	38.79%

=== Youngest drivers to score points ===
(only the first points finish for each driver is listed)

	Driver	Age	Place	Race	Career race number
1	(United Kingdom) **Taylor Barnard**	19 years, 346 days	10th	2024 Berlin ePrix (R1)	2nd race
2	(Spain) **Pepe Martí**	20 years, 211 days	7th	2026 Mexico City ePrix	2nd race
3	(France) Pierre Gasly	21 years, 158 days	7th	2017 New York City ePrix (R1)	1st race
4	(Germany) Daniel Abt	21 years, 248 days	10th	2014 Beijing ePrix	1st race
5	(Germany) **Maximilian Günther**	21 years, 299 days	5th	2019 Paris ePrix	5th race
6	(Barbados) **Zane Maloney**	22 years, 65 days	10th	2025 São Paulo ePrix	17th race
7	(Brazil) Sérgio Sette Câmara	22 years, 280 days	4th	2021 Diriyah ePrix (R2)	8th race
8	(New Zealand) **Mitch Evans**	22 years, 281 days	4th	2017 Mexico City ePrix	4th race
9	(United Kingdom) **Dan Ticktum**	22 years, 306 days	10th	2022 Rome ePrix (R2)	5th race
10	(Sweden) **Joel Eriksson**	23 years, 27 days	10th	2021 London ePrix (R2)	6th race

=== Oldest drivers to score points ===
(only the last points finish for each driver is listed)

	Driver	Age	Place	Race
1	(Brazil) **Lucas di Grassi**	41 years, 328 days	1st	2026 Shanghai ePrix (R2)
2	(France) Stéphane Sarrazin	41 years, 269 days	8th	2017 Montreal ePrix
3	(Germany) André Lotterer	41 years, 154 days	9th	2023 Berlin ePrix (R1)
4	(Germany) Nick Heidfeld	41 years, 67 days	8th	2018 New York City ePrix
5	(Italy) Jarno Trulli	40 years, 314 days	Ret	2015 Berlin ePrix
6	(Spain) Oriol Servià	40 years, 181 days	9th	2015 Buenos Aires ePrix
7	(Switzerland) **Edoardo Mortara**	39 years, 216 days	3rd	2026 London ePrix (R2)
8	(Brazil) Felipe Massa	39 years, 106 days	6th	2020 Berlin ePrix (R4)
9	(United Kingdom) Sam Bird	38 years, 164 days	7th	2025 Jakarta ePrix
10	(United Kingdom) Gary Paffett	38 years, 112 days	10th	2019 New York City ePrix

=== Most points without a win ===
	Driver	Entries	Starts	Points
1	(Germany) André Lotterer	81	81	365
2	(Germany) Nick Heidfeld	44	44	214
3	(Germany) René Rast	38	38	147
4	(United Kingdom) Jake Hughes	48	47	136
5	(France) Stéphane Sarrazin	37	37	128
6	(France) Loïc Duval	28	28	122
7	(United Kingdom) Oliver Turvey	90	88	113
8	(Brazil) Bruno Senna	21	21	90
9	(Argentina) José María López	33	33	82
10	(Brazil) **Felipe Drugovich**	19	19	71

=== Most races before scoring points ===
	Entry	Driver	Race
1	18th race	(Germany) David Beckmann	2025 London ePrix (R2)
2	17th race	(Barbados) **Zane Maloney**	2025 São Paulo ePrix
3	12th race	(Switzerland) Neel Jani	2020 Berlin ePrix (R5)
3	12th race	(Switzerland) **Nico Müller**	2021 Diriyah ePrix (R2)
5	8th race	(Switzerland) Simona de Silvestro	2016 Long Beach ePrix
5	8th race	(Brazil) Sérgio Sette Câmara	2021 Diriyah ePrix (R2)
7	7th race	(India) Jehan Daruvala	2024 Misano ePrix (R2)
8	6th race	**(France) Norman Nato**	2021 Valencia ePrix (R2)
8	6th race	(Sweden) **Joel Eriksson**	2021 London ePrix (R2)
10	5th race	(Belgium) Stoffel Vandoorne	2019 Hong Kong ePrix
10	5th race	(United Kingdom) Gary Paffett	2019 Hong Kong ePrix
10	5th race	(Germany) **Maximilian Günther**	2019 Paris ePrix
10	5th race	(United Kingdom) **Dan Ticktum**	2022 Rome ePrix (R2)

=== Highest average points per race entered ===
	Driver	Entries	Points	Average points per race entered
1	(France) Franck Montagny	2	18	9.00
1	(France) Pierre Gasly	2	18	9.00
3	(Sweden) Felix Rosenqvist	25	223	8.92
4	(United Kingdom) **Jake Dennis**	96	825	8.59
5	(New Zealand) **Nick Cassidy**	96	786	8.19
6	(New Zealand) **Mitch Evans**	144	1159	7.98
7	(France) **Jean-Éric Vergne**	163	1299	7.97
8	(Germany) **Pascal Wehrlein**	113	883	7.81
9	(Switzerland) **Sébastien Buemi**	161	1172	7.28
10	(Brazil) **Lucas di Grassi**	165	1109	6.72

== Race leaders ==
=== Most laps led, total ===
	Driver	Laps
1	(Switzerland) **Sébastien Buemi**	550
2	(France) **Jean-Éric Vergne**	529
3	(New Zealand) **Mitch Evans**	427
4	(Portugal) **Antonio Felix da Costa**	401
5	(Germany) **Pascal Wehrlein**	401
6	(New Zealand) **Nick Cassidy**	369
7	(Brazil) **Lucas di Grassi**	366
8	(United Kingdom) Sam Bird	318
9	(United Kingdom) **Jake Dennis**	309
10	(United Kingdom) **Oliver Rowland**	275

=== For at least one lap, total ===
	Driver	Races
1	(New Zealand) **Mitch Evans**	34
2	(Portugal) **Antonio Felix da Costa**	31
3	(France) **Jean-Éric Vergne**	30
4	(Germany) **Pascal Wehrlein**	29
5	(Switzerland) **Sébastien Buemi**	27
6	(New Zealand) **Nick Cassidy**	25
7	(United Kingdom) Sam Bird	20
8	(Brazil) **Lucas di Grassi**	19
8	(United Kingdom) **Oliver Rowland**	19
10	(United Kingdom) **Jake Dennis**	17
10	(Belgium) Stoffel Vandoorne	17

=== Every lap, total ===
	Driver	Races
1	(Switzerland) **Sébastien Buemi**	3
1	(France) **Jean-Éric Vergne**	3
1	(United Kingdom) **Jake Dennis**	3
4	(Portugal) **Antonio Felix da Costa**	2
4	(New Zealand) **Mitch Evans**	2
4	(New Zealand) **Nick Cassidy**	2
6	(France) Nico Prost	1
6	(Brazil) **Lucas di Grassi**	1
6	(Germany) Daniel Abt	1
6	(Netherlands) **Nyck de Vries**	1
6	(United Kingdom) **Oliver Rowland**	1
6	(United Kingdom) Alexander Sims	1
6	(United Kingdom) Sam Bird	1

== Races finished ==
=== Total career race finishes ===
	Driver	Races finished
1	(Switzerland) **Sébastien Buemi**	146
2	(France) **Jean-Éric Vergne**	144
3	(Brazil) **Lucas di Grassi**	142
4	(Portugal) **António Félix da Costa**	134
5	(New Zealand) **Mitch Evans**	123
6	(United Kingdom) Sam Bird	112
7	(Germany) **Pascal Wehrlein**	102
8	(Switzerland) **Edoardo Mortara**	96
9	(Netherlands) Robin Frijns	94
10	(Belgium) Stoffel Vandoorne	90

=== Most consecutive race finishes ===
	Driver	Races finished	Races
1	(France) **Norman Nato**	38	2023 Berlin ePrix (R1) – 2025 Jakarta ePrix
2	(Netherlands) Robin Frijns	31	2021 Diriyah ePrix (R1) – 2022 Seoul ePrix (R2)
3	(France) **Jean-Éric Vergne**	29	2023 London ePrix (R2) – 2025 Jakarta ePrix
4	(Germany) **Pascal Wehrlein**	28	2025 Mexico City ePrix – 2026 Shanghai ePrix (R2)
5	(Belgium) Stoffel Vandoorne	27	2021 New York City ePrix (R2) – 2023 São Paulo ePrix
5	(United Kingdom) **Dan Ticktum**	27	2024 São Paulo ePrix (March) – 2025 Berlin ePrix (R2)
5	(Germany) **Pascal Wehrlein**	27	2023 São Paulo ePrix – 2024 London ePrix (R2)
8	(New Zealand) **Mitch Evans**	26	2018 New York City ePrix (R2) – 2021 Diriyah ePrix (R1)
9	(United Kingdom) Sam Bird	24	2017 Paris ePrix – 2019 Hong Kong ePrix
10	(New Zealand) **Nick Cassidy**	22	2025 Mexico City ePrix – 2026 Berlin ePrix (R1)

== Fanboost ==
=== Total Fanboost Wins ===
	Driver	Entries	Fanboost
1	(Belgium) Stoffel Vandoorne	55	55
2	(Brazil) **Lucas di Grassi**	100	53
2	(Portugal) **Antonio Felix da Costa**	96	53
4	(Switzerland) **Sébastien Buemi**	98	41
5	(Germany) Daniel Abt	69	38
6	(Netherlands) **Nyck de Vries**	42	29
7	(France) **Jean-Éric Vergne**	98	25
8	(United Kingdom) Sam Bird	98	14
9	(Germany) Nick Heidfeld	44	8
9	(Brazil) Nelson Piquet Jr.	51	8
9	(Germany) André Lotterer	67	8
9	(New Zealand) **Mitch Evans**	79	8

== Other driver records ==
Description	Record	Details	Ref.
Championships
Most races left in the season when becoming champion	2	(Portugal) **António Félix da Costa** (2019-20 in round 9 of 11) and (United Kingdom) **Oliver Rowland** (2024-25 in round 14 of 16)	
Most points between first and second in the championship	71	between (Portugal) **António Félix da Costa** (158 pts.) and (Belgium) Stoffel Vandoorne (87 pts.) in 2019-20	
Fewest points between first and second in the championship	1	between (Brazil) Nelson Piquet Jr. (144 pts.) and (Switzerland) **Sébastien Buemi** (143 pts.) in 2014-15	
Youngest champion	26 years, 190 days	(Netherlands) **Nyck de Vries** (2020-21)	
Oldest champion	32 years, 353 days	(Brazil) **Lucas di Grassi** (2016-17)	
Highest finishing position in a championship for a rookie (excluding 2014-15)	3rd	(Sweden) Felix Rosenqvist (2016-17) (United Kingdom) **Jake Dennis** (2020-21)	
Most championship leader changes in a season	10 (2025-26)	(United Kingdom) **Jake Dennis** (New Zealand) **Nick Cassidy** (Germany) **Pascal Wehrlein** (Switzerland) **Edoardo Mortara** (Germany) **Pascal Wehrlein** (New Zealand) **Mitch Evans** (Germany) **Pascal Wehrlein** (New Zealand) **Mitch Evans** (United Kingdom) **Jake Dennis** (Germany) **Pascal Wehrlein**	
Most championship leaders in a season	5 (2018-19) (2019-20) (2025-26)	(Portugal) **António Félix da Costa** (Belgium) Jérôme d'Ambrosio (United Kingdom) Sam Bird (Netherlands) Robin Frijns (France) **Jean-Éric Vergne** (United Kingdom) Sam Bird (United Kingdom) Alexander Sims (Belgium) Stoffel Vandoorne (New Zealand) **Mitch Evans** (Portugal) **António Félix da Costa** (United Kingdom) **Jake Dennis** (New Zealand) **Nick Cassidy** (Germany) **Pascal Wehrlein** (Switzerland) **Edoardo Mortara** (New Zealand) **Mitch Evans**	
Most champions competing in a season	8	2024-25 ( (Switzerland) **Sébastien Buemi**, (Brazil) **Lucas di Grassi**, (France) **Jean-Éric Vergne**, (Portugal) **António Félix da Costa**, (Netherlands) **Nyck de Vries**, (Belgium) Stoffel Vandoorne, (United Kingdom) **Jake Dennis**, (Germany) **Pascal Wehrlein**) 2025-26 ( (Switzerland) **Sébastien Buemi**, (Brazil) **Lucas di Grassi**, (France) **Jean-Éric Vergne**, (Portugal) **António Félix da Costa**, (Netherlands) **Nyck de Vries**, (United Kingdom) **Jake Dennis**, (Germany) **Pascal Wehrlein**, (United Kingdom) **Oliver Rowland**)	
Most championship seasons as runner-up	3	(Switzerland) **Sébastien Buemi**	
Wins
Most different ePrix won	12	(Brazil) **Lucas di Grassi**	
Most wins with the same team	16	(New Zealand) **Mitch Evans** ( (United Kingdom) Jaguar Racing)	
Most race winners in one season	11	2020–21( (Netherlands) **Nyck de Vries**, (United Kingdom) **Jake Dennis**, (United Kingdom) Sam Bird, (Portugal) **António Félix da Costa**, (Brazil) **Lucas di Grassi**, (France) **Jean-Éric Vergne**, (Belgium) Stoffel Vandoorne, (Switzerland) **Edoardo Mortara**, (Germany) **Maximilian Günther**, (United Kingdom) Alex Lynn, (France) **Norman Nato**); 2025–26( (United Kingdom) **Jake Dennis**, (New Zealand) **Nick Cassidy**, (New Zealand) **Mitch Evans**, (Germany) **Pascal Wehrlein**, (Portugal) **António Félix da Costa**, (Switzerland) **Nico Müller**, (Netherlands) **Nyck de Vries**, (United Kingdom) **Oliver Rowland**, (Brazil) **Lucas di Grassi**, (United Kingdom) **Dan Ticktum**, (United Kingdom) **Taylor Barnard**)	
Most different race winners in consecutive races	10 (2020-21 – 2021-22	(Germany) **Maximilian Günther** (2021 New York City ePrix Race 1) (United Kingdom) Sam Bird (2021 New York City ePrix Race 2) (United Kingdom) **Jake Dennis** (2021 London ePrix Race 1) (United Kingdom) Alex Lynn (2021 London ePrix Race 2) (Brazil) **Lucas di Grassi** (2021 Berlin ePrix Race 1) (France) **Norman Nato** (2021 Berlin ePrix Race 2) (Netherlands) **Nyck de Vries** (2022 Diriyah ePrix Race 1) (Switzerland) **Edoardo Mortara** (2022 Diriyah ePrix Race 2) (Germany) **Pascal Wehrlein** (2022 Mexico City ePrix) (New Zealand) **Mitch Evans** (2022 Rome ePrix Race 1)	
Most different race winners in consecutive races from the first race of season	8 (2018-19)	(Portugal) **António Félix da Costa** (2018 Ad Diriyah ePrix) (Belgium) Jérôme d'Ambrosio (2019 Marrakesh ePrix) (United Kingdom) Sam Bird (2019 Santiago ePrix) (Brazil) **Lucas di Grassi** (2019 Mexico City ePrix) (Switzerland) **Edoardo Mortara** (2019 Hong Kong ePrix) (France) **Jean-Éric Vergne** (2019 Sanya ePrix) (New Zealand) **Mitch Evans** (2019 Rome ePrix) (Netherlands) Robin Frijns (2019 Paris ePrix)	
Fewest race wins in championship winning season	1	(Belgium) Stoffel Vandoorne (2021-22)	
Champion with fewest career wins	2	(Brazil) Nelson Piquet Jr.	
Most race wins in one season without becoming champion	6	(Switzerland) **Sébastien Buemi** (2016-17)	
Most race wins not starting on the front row	11	(New Zealand) **Mitch Evans**	
Podiums
Highest percentage of podium finishes in one season	70	(Brazil) **Lucas di Grassi**, 7 podium finishes out of 10 races in 2015-16	
Most podiums for the same team	38	(New Zealand) **Mitch Evans** ( (United Kingdom) Jaguar Racing)	
Most consecutive podium finishes (starting from debut)	3	(Brazil) **Lucas di Grassi** (2014 Beijing ePrix–2014 Punta del Este ePrix)	
Most podium finishers in one season	20 (2020-21)	(Netherlands) **Nyck de Vries** (Switzerland) **Edoardo Mortara** (United Kingdom) **Jake Dennis** (New Zealand) **Mitch Evans** (Netherlands) Robin Frijns (United Kingdom) Sam Bird (Brazil) **Lucas di Grassi** (Portugal) **António Félix da Costa** (Belgium) Stoffel Vandoorne (France) **Jean-Éric Vergne** (Germany) **Pascal Wehrlein** (United Kingdom) Alex Lynn (Germany) René Rast (United Kingdom) **Oliver Rowland** (New Zealand) **Nick Cassidy** (Germany) **Maximilian Günther** (Germany) André Lotterer (France) **Norman Nato** (United Kingdom) Alexander Sims (Switzerland) **Nico Müller**	
Most podium finishes before a victory	8	(France) **Jean-Éric Vergne**	
Most second places	17	(Brazil) **Lucas di Grassi**	
Most third places	14	(Switzerland) **Sébastien Buemi**	
Points
Most points scored in a single race event	30	(Switzerland) **Sébastien Buemi** (2015 Beijing ePrix)	
Most points scored in a double-header event	53	(France) Nicolas Prost (2016 London ePrix) (United Kingdom) Sam Bird (2017 New York City ePrix)	
Most points scored in a double-header event	58	(Portugal) **António Félix da Costa** (2020 Berlin ePrix Races 1 & 2) (Note: The 2020 Berlin ePrix consisted of six races in total with three double-headers.)	
