= 2025 Tokyo ePrix =

Race 8 of 16 of the 2024–25 Formula E season
| ← Previous race | Next race → |
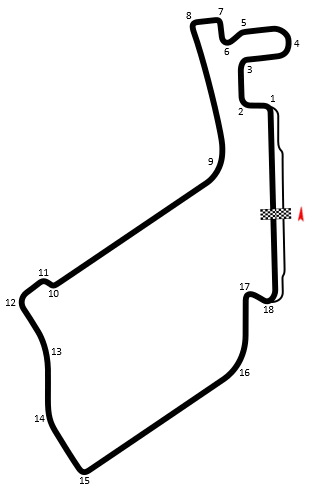

Race details
- Date: 17 May 2025
- Official name: 2025 Tokyo ePrix
- Location: Tokyo Street Circuit, Tokyo, Japan
- Course: Street Circuit
- Course length: 2.575 km (1.600 mi)
- Distance: 38 (Note: 35 planned laps and 3 extra laps) laps, 97.85 km (60.80 mi)
- Scheduled distance: 35 laps, 90.12 km (56.00 mi)
- Weather: Rain and clouds

Pole position
| Driver | (United Kingdom) Oliver Rowland | Nissan |
- Time: 1:32.525

Fastest lap
| Driver | (New Zealand) Nick Cassidy | Jaguar |
- Time: 1:22.283

Podium
| First | (Belgium) Stoffel Vandoorne | Maserati |
| Second | (United Kingdom) Oliver Rowland | Nissan |
| Third | (United Kingdom) Taylor Barnard | Mclaren-Nissan |

2025 Tokyo ePrix
Race 9 of 16 of the 2024–25 Formula E season
| ← Previous race | Next race → |
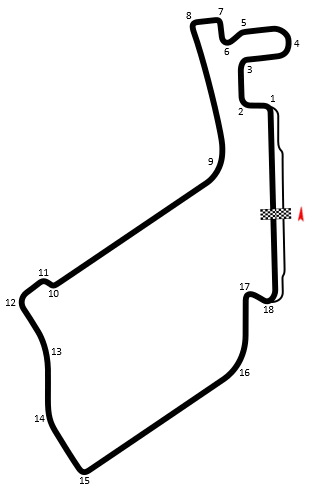

Race details
- Date: 18 May 2025
- Official name: 2025 Tokyo ePrix
- Location: Tokyo Street Circuit, Tokyo, Japan
- Course: Street Circuit
- Course length: 2.575 km (1.600 mi)
- Distance: 32 laps, 82.39 km (51.19 mi)
- Weather: Cloudy

Pole position
| Driver | (United Kingdom) Oliver Rowland | Nissan |
- Time: 1:12.615

Fastest lap
| Driver | (United Kingdom) Sam Bird | Mclaren-Nissan |
- Time: 1:14.753 on lap 25

Podium
| First | (United Kingdom) Oliver Rowland | Nissan |
| Second | (Germany) Pascal Wehrlein | Porsche |
| Third | (United Kingdom) Dan Ticktum | Cupra Kiro-Porsche |

The 2025 Tokyo ePrix was the eighth and ninth race of the 2024–25 Formula E World Championship, held on 17-18 May 2025. It was the second running of the Tokyo ePrix, held around the Tokyo Street Circuit.

== Background ==
Oliver Rowland entered the race as the leader in the Drivers' Championship with a 48 point lead over António Félix da Costa, followed by defending champion Pascal Wehrlein (49 points behind).

Prior to the race, Porsche held a 35 point lead over Nissan in the Teams' Championship, with Mahindra Racing in third and DS Penske in fourth. In the Manufacturers' Trophy, Nissan held a 29 point lead over Porsche, with Jaguar in third.

The first race featured the Pit Boost quick charge feature.

== Classification ==
All times are in Japan Standard Time (JST).

=== Race 1 ===
==== Qualification ====
The qualifying session for Race 1 was originally set to take place at 10:20 on 17 May. However, due to torrential rain and unfavorable track conditions, the session was cancelled roughly 40 minutes after its scheduled time. This marked the first-time in Formula E history that a non-practice session had been canceled.

The order of the starting grid was determined by the results from Free Practice 2, that had taken place earlier in the day under damp conditions. Oliver Rowland of Nissan Formula E Team received pole position, though due to the session not having started, no championship points would be awarded for pole position.

===== Free Practice 2 Classification - Starting Grid Order =====
| Pos. | No. | Driver | Team | Time | Grid |
|---|---|---|---|---|---|
| 1 | 23 | (United Kingdom) Oliver Rowland | Nissan | 1:32.525 | 1 |
| 2 | 48 | (Switzerland) Edoardo Mortara | Mahindra | 1:33.212 | 2 |
| 3 | 17 | (France) Norman Nato | Nissan | 1:33.488 | 3 |
| 4 | 5 | (United Kingdom) Taylor Barnard | Mclaren-Nissan | 1:33.566 | 4 |
| 5 | 21 | (Netherlands) Nyck De Vries | Mahindra | 1:33.570 | 5 |
| 6 | 16 | (Switzerland) Sebastien Buemi | Envision-Jaguar | 1:33.959 | 6 |
| 7 | 33 | (United Kingdom) Dan Ticktum | Cupra Kiro-Porsche | 1:34.133 | 7 |
| 8 | 25 | (France) Jean-Eric Vergne | DS Penske | 1:34.177 | 8 |
| 9 | 7 | (Germany) Maximilian Gunther | DS Penske | 1:34.307 | 9 |
| 10 | 4 | (Netherlands) Robin Frijns | Envision-Jaguar | 1:34.326 | 10 |
| 11 | 13 | (Portugal) Antonio Felix da Costa | Porsche | 1:34.545 | 11 |
| 12 | 8 | (United Kingdom) Sam Bird | Mclaren-Nissan | 1:34.604 | 12 |
| 13 | 37 | (New Zealand) Nick Cassidy | Jaguar | 1:34.983 | 13 |
| 14 | 2 | (Belgium) Stoffel Vandoorne | Maserati | 1:35.246 | 14 |
| 15 | 55 | (United Kingdom) Jake Hughes | Maserati | 1:35.407 | 15 |
| 16 | 22 | (Barbados) Zane Maloney | Lola Yamaha ABT | 1:36.182 | 16 |
| 17 | 1 | (Germany) Pascal Wehrlein | Porsche | 1:37.109 | 17 |
| 18 | 11 | (Brazil) Lucas di Grassi | Lola Yamaha ABT | 1:37.554 | 18 |
| 19 | 9 | (New Zealand) Mitch Evans | Jaguar | 1:37.951 | 19 |
| 20 | 3 | (Germany) David Beckmann | Cupra Kiro-Porsche | 1:38.604 | 20 |
| 21 | 51 | (Switzerland) Nico Muller | Andretti-Porsche | 1:38.867 | 21 |
| 22 | 27 | (United Kingdom) Jake Dennis | Andretti-Porsche | 1:38.977 | 22 |

==== Race ====
The race was set to start at 15:05 on 17 May, however due to weather, the race start was rescheduled to 15:15, 10 minutes after the original start time. This race was the 3rd race of the season that included the 30-second "Pit Boost" stops, and the first where the stops had been conducted under damp race conditions.

The race originally started under safety car conditions, however after 4 of 35 laps had been completed, the drivers were ordered to conduct the usual standing start procedure.

Stoffel Vandoorne emerged triumphant after 38 laps of racing to take his first victory since the 2022 Monaco ePrix, ending a 49 race drought. Vandoorne had taken his "Pit Boost" stop before the Red Flag came out on Lap 13 for Maximilian Gunther’s stalled DS Penske car, meaning that he was able to gain a net advantage over the rest of the field. This allowed him to take a dominant victory by 8 seconds over Nissan’s Oliver Rowland, making this the first victory for Maserati in the 2024-25 season, and their second consecutive win in Tokyo.

| Pos. | No. | Driver | Team | Laps | Time/Retired | Grid | Points |
|---|---|---|---|---|---|---|---|
| 1 | 2 | (Belgium) Stoffel Vandoorne | Maserati | 38 | 1:17:00.573 | 14 | 25 |
| 2 | 23 | (United Kingdom) Oliver Rowland | Nissan | 38 | +8.140 | 1 | 18 |
| 3 | 5 | (United Kingdom) Taylor Barnard | McLaren-Nissan | 38 | +8.695 | 4 | 15 |
| 4 | 16 | (Switzerland) Sébastien Buemi | Envision-Jaguar | 38 | +9.047 | 6 | 12 |
| 5 | 33 | (United Kingdom) Dan Ticktum | Cupra Kiro-Porsche | 38 | +14.499 | 7 | 10 |
| 6 | 48 | (Switzerland) Edoardo Mortara | Mahindra | 38 | +15.974 | 2 | 8 |
| 7 | 13 | (Portugal) António Félix da Costa | Porsche | 38 | +19.035 | 11 | 6 |
| 8 | 25 | (France) Jean-Eric Vergne | DS Penske | 38 | +22.529 | 8 | 4 |
| 9 | 4 | (Netherlands) Robin Frijns | Envision-Jaguar | 38 | +23.958 | 10 | 2 |
| 10 | 37 | (New Zealand) Nick Cassidy | Jaguar | 38 | +25.039 | 13 | 1+1^{1} |
| 11 | 21 | (Netherlands) Nyck De Vries | Mahindra | 38 | +25.781 (Note: De Vries received a 5 second time penalty post-race for causing a collision with Mitch Evans.) | 5 | |
| 12 | 51 | (Switzerland) Nico Müller | Andretti-Porsche | 38 | +29.794 | 21 | |
| 13 | 1 | (Germany) Pascal Wehrlein | Porsche | 38 | +31.111 | 17 | |
| 14 | 8 | (United Kingdom) Sam Bird | McLaren-Nissan | 38 | +40.763 (Note: Bird received a 5 second penalty for failing to follow the race director’s instructions.) | 12 | |
| 15 | 17 | (France) Norman Nato | Nissan | 38 | +42.345 | 3 | |
| 16 | 22 | (Barbados) Zane Maloney | Lola Yamaha ABT | 38 | +43.600 | 16 | |
| 17 | 11 | (Brazil) Lucas Di Grassi | Lola Yamaha ABT | 38 | +46.468 | 18 | |
| 18 | 3 | (Germany) David Beckmann | Cupra Kiro-Porsche | 38 | +51.851 | 20 | |
| 19 | 55 | (United Kingdom) Jake Hughes | Maserati | 37 | +1 lap | 15 | |
| Ret | 9 | (New Zealand) Mitch Evans | Jaguar | 21 | Crash Damage | 19 | |
| Ret | 7 | (Germany) Maximilian Günther | DS Penske | 11 | Battery Issue | 9 | |
| DSQ | 27 | (United Kingdom) Jake Dennis (Note: Dennis was disqualified for entering the pit lane while it was closed.) | Andretti-Porsche | 20 | | 22 | |

Notes:

- ^1 – Fastest lap.

==== Standings after the race ====
Drivers' Championship standings

| | Pos | Driver | Points |
|---|---|---|---|
| | 1 | (United Kingdom) Oliver Rowland | 133 |
| | 2 | (Portugal) António Félix da Costa | 73 |
| 1 | 3 | (United Kingdom) Taylor Barnard | 69 |
| 1 | 4 | (Germany) Pascal Wehrlein | 66 |
| | 5 | (Netherlands) Nyck de Vries | 52 |

Teams' Championship standings

| | Pos | Team | Points |
|---|---|---|---|
| 1 | 1 | (Japan) Nissan | 144 |
| 1 | 2 | (Germany) Porsche | 139 |
| | 3 | (India) Mahindra | 99 |
| 1 | 4 | (United Kingdom) McLaren | 85 |
| 1 | 5 | (United States) DS Penske | 80 |

Manufacturers' Championship standings

| | Pos | Manufacturer | Points |
|---|---|---|---|
| | 1 | (Japan) Nissan | 225 |
| | 2 | (Germany) Porsche | 179 |
| 2 | 3 | (Netherlands) Stellantis | 136 |
| 1 | 4 | (United Kingdom) Jaguar | 128 |
| 1 | 5 | (India) Mahindra | 119 |

- Notes: Only the top five positions are included for all three sets of standings.

=== Race 2 ===
==== Qualification ====
Qualification took place at 10:20 on 18 May.

Group draw
| Group A | (United Kingdom) ROW | (United Kingdom) BAR | (Netherlands) DEV | (Belgium) VAN | (Switzerland) BUE | (France) JEV | (New Zealand) CAS | (New Zealand) EVA | (Brazil) DIG | (France) NAT | (Barbados) MAL |
| Group B | (Portugal) DAC | (Germany) WEH | (Switzerland) MOR | (United Kingdom) DEN | (Germany) GUE | (United Kingdom) TIC | (United Kingdom) HUG | (Switzerland) MUE | (United Kingdom) BIR | (Netherlands) FRI | (Germany) BEC |

===== Qualifying duels =====
Quarter-finals
A2 | (France) Norman Nato
A3 | (United Kingdom) Oliver Rowland
A1 | (Brazil) Lucas di Grassi
A4 | (France) Jean-Éric Vergne
B2 | (Switzerland) Edoardo Mortara
B3 | (United Kingdom) Dan Ticktum
B1 | (Germany) Pascal Wehrlein
B4 | (Portugal) António Félix da Costa

Semi-finals
(United Kingdom) Oliver Rowland
(France) Jean-Éric Vergne
(United Kingdom) Dan Ticktum
(Germany) Pascal Wehrlein

Final
(United Kingdom) Oliver Rowland
(United Kingdom) Dan Ticktum

==== Overall classification ====
| Pos. | No. | Driver | Team | A | B | QF | SF | F | Grid |
|---|---|---|---|---|---|---|---|---|---|
| 1 | 23 | (United Kingdom) Oliver Rowland | Nissan | 1:13:818 | —N/a | 1:12:375 | 1:12:007 | 1:12:615 | 1 |
| 2 | 33 | (United Kingdom) Dan Ticktum | Cupra Kiro-Porsche | —N/a | 1:13:715 | 1:12:173 | 1:12:028 | 1:24:181 | 2 |
| 3 | 1 | (Germany) Pascal Wehrlein | Porsche | —N/a | 1:13:671 | 1:12:299 | 1:12:189 | —N/a | 3 |
| 4 | 25 | (France) Jean-Eric Vergne | DS Penske | 1:13:892 | —N/a | 1:12:681 | 1:12:602 | —N/a | 4 |
| 5 | 48 | (Switzerland) Edoardo Mortara | Mahindra | —N/a | 1:13:708 | 1:12:754 | —N/a | —N/a | 5 |
| 6 | 11 | (Brazil) Lucas di Grassi | Lola Yamaha ABT | 1:13:781 | —N/a | 1:12:756 | —N/a | —N/a | 6 |
| 7 | 13 | (Portugal) António Félix da Costa | Porsche | —N/a | 1:13:812 | 1:12:920 | —N/a | —N/a | 7 |
| 8 | 17 | (France) Norman Nato | Nissan | 1:13:790 | —N/a | 1:30:431 | —N/a | —N/a | 8 |
| 9 | 4 | (United Kingdom) Taylor Barnard | McLaren-Nissan | 1:14:040 | —N/a | —N/a | —N/a | —N/a | 9 |
| 10 | 8 | (United Kingdom) Sam Bird | McLaren-Nissan | —N/a | 1:13:812 | —N/a | —N/a | —N/a | 10 |
| 11 | 21 | (Netherlands) Nyck de Vries | Mahindra | 1:14:056 | —N/a | —N/a | —N/a | —N/a | 11 |
| 12 | 7 | (Germany) Maximilian Günther | DS Penske | —N/a | 1:13:975 | —N/a | —N/a | —N/a | 12 |
| 13 | 37 | (New Zealand) Nick Cassidy | Jaguar | 1:14:106 | —N/a | —N/a | —N/a | —N/a | 13 |
| 14 | 27 | (United Kingdom) Jake Dennis | Andretti-Porsche | —N/a | 1:13:987 | —N/a | —N/a | —N/a | 14 |
| 15 | 22 | (Barbados) Zane Maloney | Lola Yamaha ABT | 1:14:157 | —N/a | —N/a | —N/a | —N/a | 15 |
| 16 | 3 | (Germany) David Beckmann | Cupra Kiro-Porsche | —N/a | 1:14:045 | —N/a | —N/a | —N/a | 16 |
| 17 | 16 | (Switzerland) Sébastian Buemi | Envision-Jaguar | 1:14:258 | —N/a | —N/a | —N/a | —N/a | 17 |
| 18 | 55 | (United Kingdom) Jake Hughes | Maserati | —N/a | 1:14:234 | —N/a | —N/a | —N/a | 18 |
| 19 | 2 | (Belgium) Stoffel Vandoorne | Maserati | 1:14:453 | —N/a | —N/a | —N/a | —N/a | 19 |
| 20 | 51 | (Switzerland) Nico Müller | Andretti-Porsche | —N/a | 1:14:268 | —N/a | —N/a | —N/a | 20 |
| 21 | 9 | (New Zealand) Mitch Evans | Jaguar | 1:24:043 | —N/a | —N/a | —N/a | —N/a | 21 |
| 22 | 4 | (Netherlands) Robin Frijns | Envision-Jaguar | —N/a | 1:14:456 | —N/a | —N/a | —N/a | 22 |

==== Race ====
The race started at 15:05 on 18 May.

Mitch Evans of Jaguar Racing was forced to withdraw from the race, due to substantial damage to his car after a crash in the qualifying session.

The race saw a dramatic battle for the lead in the last few laps between Rowland, Wehrlein, Ticktum, and Barnard. Rowland had managed to climb from 6th (following a relatively unsuccessful use of his first attack mode activation), to retake the lead on Lap 26 from Wehrlein with his second attack mode activation.

On Lap 29, the battle for the lead reached its climax when Rowland and Wehrlein went side-by-side through the final chicane (Turns 17-18), with Rowland holding onto the lead. Behind them, Ticktum had been able to get ahead of Barnard for 3rd, and nearly capitalized off of an opportunity to get ahead of Wehrlein for 2nd as well in Turns 1-2. However, at Turn 6, the battle for the lead came to an end when Taylor Barnard took contact from Edoardo Mortara, sending him into the wall and breaking the rear suspension of his McLaren. This brought out a late race Safety Car, with no laps added onto the original race distance.

As a result, when the race got restarted on the final lap, the drivers didn't need to conserve as much energy to make the finish, allowing Oliver Rowland in the Nissan to comfortably take the victory over Wehrlein in 2nd, and Ticktum in 3rd. This was the first time that Nissan had taken victory on home soil in a Formula E race, and was also the first career Formula E podium for Dan Ticktum from the Cupra Kiro team.

| Pos. | No. | Driver | Team | Laps | Time/Retired | Grid | Points |
|---|---|---|---|---|---|---|---|
| 1 | 23 | (United Kingdom) Oliver Rowland | Nissan | 32 | 45:51:352 | 1 | 25+3^{1} |
| 2 | 1 | (Germany) Pascal Wehrlein | Porsche | 32 | +0.337 | 3 | 18 |
| 3 | 33 | (United Kingdom) Dan Ticktum | Cupra Kiro-Porsche | 32 | +0.901 | 2 | 15 |
| 4 | 27 | (United Kingdom) Jake Dennis | Andretti-Porsche | 32 | +1.156 | 14 | 12 |
| 5 | 11 | (Brazil) Lucas Di Grassi | Lola Yamaha ABT | 32 | +2.917 | 6 | 10 |
| 6 | 25 | (France) Jean-Eric Vergne | DS Penske | 32 | +3.698 | 4 | 8 |
| 7 | 37 | (New Zealand) Nick Cassidy | Jaguar | 32 | +3.995 | 13 | 6 |
| 8 | 8 | (United Kingdom) Sam Bird | McLaren-Nissan | 32 | +4.327 | 10 | 4+1^{2} |
| 9 | 16 | (Switzerland) Sébastien Buemi | Envision | 32 | +4.884 | 16 | 2 |
| 10 | 7 | (Germany) Maximilian Günther | DS Penske | 32 | +5.186 | 12 | 1 |
| 11 | 51 | (Switzerland) Nico Müller | Andretti-Porsche | 32 | +6.088 | 20 | |
| 12 | 48 | (Switzerland) Edoardo Mortara | Mahindra | 32 | +6.694 (Note: Mortara was given a 5-second time penalty for causing a collision with Barnard.) | 5 | |
| 13 | 3 | (Germany) David Beckmann | Cupra Kiro-Porsche | 32 | +6.892 | 19 | |
| 14 | 22 | (Barbados) Zane Maloney | Lola Yamaha ABT | 32 | +7.898 | 15 | |
| 15 | 21 | (Netherlands) Nyck De Vries | Mahindra | 32 | +10.192 | 11 | |
| 16 | 4 | (Netherlands) Robin Frijns | Envision | 32 | +10.560 | 22 | |
| 17 | 17 | (France) Norman Nato | Nissan | 32 | +14.686 (Note: Nato was given a 5-second time penalty for speeding under full course yellow.) | 8 | |
| 18 | 55 | (United Kingdom) Jake Hughes | Maserati | 32 | +1:12.476 | 17 | |
| Ret | 5 | (United Kingdom) Taylor Barnard | McLaren-Nissan | 29 | Collision | 9 | |
| Ret | 2 | (Belgium) Stoffel Vandoorne | Maserati | 29 | Accident | 18 | |
| Ret | 13 | (Portugal) António Félix da Costa | Porsche | 13 | Collision damage | 7 | |
| DNS | 9 | (New Zealand) Mitch Evans | Jaguar | 0 | | 21 | |

Notes:

- ^1 – Pole position.
- ^2 – Fastest lap.

==== Standings after the race ====
Drivers' Championship standings

| | Pos | Driver | Points |
|---|---|---|---|
| | 1 | (United Kingdom) Oliver Rowland | 161 |
| 2 | 2 | (Germany) Pascal Wehrlein | 84 |
| 1 | 3 | (Portugal) António Félix da Costa | 73 |
| 1 | 4 | (United Kingdom) Taylor Barnard | 69 |
| 3 | 5 | (United Kingdom) Jake Dennis | 56 |

Teams' Championship standings

| Pos | Team | Points |
|---|---|---|
| 1 | (Japan) Nissan | 172 |
| 2 | (Germany) Porsche | 157 |
| 3 | (India) Mahindra | 99 |
| 4 | (United Kingdom) McLaren | 90 |
| 5 | (United States) DS Penske | 89 |

Manufacturers' Championship standings

| Pos | Manufacturer | Points |
|---|---|---|
| 1 | (Japan) Nissan | 256 |
| 2 | (Germany) Porsche | 212 |
| 3 | (Netherlands) Stellantis | 148 |
| 4 | (United Kingdom) Jaguar | 141 |
| 5 | (India) Mahindra | 120 |

- Notes: Only the top five positions are included for all three sets of standings.

== Notes ==
| Previous race: 2025 Monaco ePrix | FIA Formula E World Championship; 2024–25 season | Next race: 2025 Shanghai ePrix |
| Previous race: 2024 Tokyo ePrix | Tokyo ePrix | Next race: 2026 Tokyo ePrix |
