= Tokyo ePrix =

Formula E race

- Tokyo Street Circuit (2025)
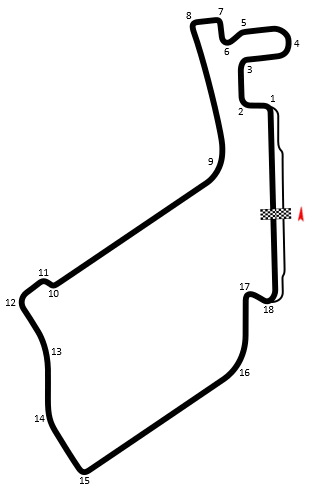

Race information
- Number of times held: 3
- First held: 2024
- Most wins (constructors): Maserati MSG Racing (2)
- Circuit length: 2.575 km (1.600 miles)

Last race (2026)

Pole position
- (Switzerland) Edoardo Mortara; Mahindra; 1:12.341

Podium
- 1. (Netherlands) Nyck de Vries; Mahindra; 1:01:13.217; 2. (New Zealand) Nick Cassidy; Citroën Racing; +0.683; 3. (United Kingdom) Jake Dennis; Andretti-Porsche; +0.958

Fastest lap
- (United Kingdom) Jake Dennis; Andretti-Porsche; 1:14.528

The Tokyo ePrix is a race of the FIA Formula E World Championship, an all-electric single-seater racing series. The race was held for the first time at the Tokyo Street Circuit on 30 March 2024.

== History ==
Tokyo was one of the first cities contacted by Formula E before its first season, with co-founder Alberto Longo attending meetings with the Tokyo Metropolitan Government since 2013. The event has been seen as a way of achieving Tokyo's goal to ensure all new automobiles are non-gasoline by 2030, with Tokyo Governor Yuriko Koike stating that "the championships will give momentum to spread zero-emission vehicles". After nearly a decade, a preliminary agreement was reached between Formula E and the Tokyo Government on 4 October 2022 to hold a race in the spring of 2024, with the race being officially announced on the provisional calendar for the 2023-24 season on 20 June 2023. The first Tokyo ePrix was won by Maximilian Günther for Maserati MSG Racing.

== Circuit ==
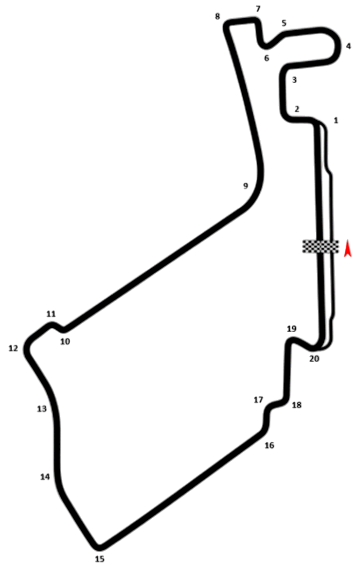
The original track layout used in the 2024 Tokyo ePrix.

The circuit layout was firstly announced on 25 October 2023. It was originally proposed as 18-turn, 2.582 km (1.604 mi) street circuit around the Tokyo Big Sight. However, the layout was modified before the first race to be a 20-turn, 2.585 km (1.606 mi) street circuit around the same venue, with a chicane placed at the originally high-speed Turn 16 kink.

Before the second race in 2025, the track went through further changes, with the removal of the chicane at Turn 16. Additionally, Turn 1, 4, 6 were widened, Turn 6 and 8 had apex adjustments, and the infamous bump in the Turn 2-3 complex was smoothened, with the track being repaved in that section. The changes to the circuit garnered praise by several drivers, including Oliver Rowland and Pascal Wehrlein.

== Results ==
Edition	Track	Winner	Second	Third	Pole position	Fastest lap	Source
2024	Tokyo Street Circuit	(Germany) Maximilian Günther; Maserati MSG Racing	(United Kingdom) Oliver Rowland; Nissan Formula E Team	(United Kingdom) Jake Dennis; Andretti Formula E Team	(United Kingdom) Oliver Rowland; Nissan Formula E Team	(United Kingdom) Sam Bird; NEOM McLaren Formula E Team	
2025	Tokyo Street Circuit	(Belgium) Stoffel Vandoorne; Maserati MSG Racing	(United Kingdom) Oliver Rowland; Nissan Formula E Team	(United Kingdom) Taylor Barnard; NEOM McLaren Formula E Team	(United Kingdom) Oliver Rowland; Nissan Formula E Team	(New Zealand) Nick Cassidy; Jaguar TCS Racing	
2025	Tokyo Street Circuit	(United Kingdom) Oliver Rowland; Nissan Formula E Team	(Germany) Pascal Wehrlein; Porsche Formula E Team	(United Kingdom) Dan Ticktum; Cupra Kiro	(United Kingdom) Oliver Rowland; Nissan Formula E Team	(United Kingdom) Sam Bird; NEOM McLaren Formula E Team	
2026	Tokyo Street Circuit	(United Kingdom) Dan Ticktum; Cupra Kiro	(United Kingdom) Jake Dennis; Andretti Formula E	(New Zealand) Nick Cassidy; Citroën Racing	(United Kingdom) Jake Dennis; Andretti Formula E	(United Kingdom) Dan Ticktum; Cupra Kiro	
2026	Tokyo Street Circuit	(Netherlands) Nyck de Vries; Mahindra Racing	(New Zealand) Nick Cassidy; Citroën Racing	(United Kingdom) Jake Dennis; Andretti Formula E	(Switzerland) Edoardo Mortara; Mahindra Racing	(United Kingdom) Jake Dennis; Andretti Formula E	
