= 2024 Tokyo ePrix =

Race 5 of 16 of the 2023–24 Formula E season
← Previous race	Next race →
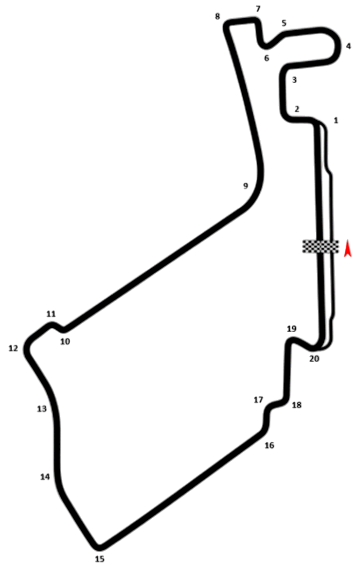

Race details
- Date: 30 March 2024
- Official name: 2024 Tokyo ePrix
- Location: Tokyo Street Circuit, Tokyo, Japan
- Course: Street Circuit
- Course length: 2.585 km (1.606 mi)
- Distance: 35 (Note: 33 planned laps and 2 extra laps) laps, 90.475 km (56.219 mi)
- Scheduled distance: 33 laps, 85.305 km (53.006 mi)

Pole position
Driver	(United Kingdom) Oliver Rowland	Nissan
- Time: 1:19.023

Fastest lap
Driver	(United Kingdom) Sam Bird; Maximilian Günther (Note: The point for fastest lap was awarded to Günther, as Bird did not finish in the top 10.)	McLaren-Nissan
- Time: 1:19.731 on lap 27

Podium
First	(Germany) Maximilian Günther	Maserati
Second	(United Kingdom) Oliver Rowland	Nissan
Third	(United Kingdom) Jake Dennis	Andretti-Porsche

The 2024 Tokyo ePrix was the fifth race of the 2023–24 Formula E World Championship, held on 30 March 2024. It was the first running of the Tokyo ePrix, a new event held around the Tokyo Street Circuit.

The ePrix was won by Maximilian Günther for Maserati, who overtook Nissan driver Oliver Rowland towards the end of the race after saving energy throughout. Defending champion Jake Dennis completed the podium in third place for Andretti. Günther's win was his fifth Formula E race victory and first of the season to date, and only the second ever Formula E victory for Maserati.

== Background ==
Nick Cassidy entered the race as the leader in the Drivers' Championship with a four point lead over Pascal Wehrlein, followed by Mitch Evans and Jean-Éric Vergne (both 18 points behind) and defending champion Jake Dennis (19 points behind).

Prior to the race, Jaguar held a 35 point lead over Porsche in the Teams' Championship, with DS Penske in third and McLaren in fourth. In the Manufacturers' Trophy, Jaguar held a 28 point lead over Porsche, with Nissan in third.

== Classification ==
All times are in Japan Standard Time (JST).

=== Qualification ===
Qualification took place at 10:20 on 30 March.

Group draw
Group A	(Switzerland) BUE	(New Zealand) CAS	(Portugal) DAC	(India) DAR	(United Kingdom) DEN	(Brazil) DIG	(New Zealand) EVA	(United Kingdom) HUG	(Switzerland) MOR	(France) NAT	(United Kingdom) ROW
Group B	(United Kingdom) BIR	(Netherlands) DEV	(France) FEN	(Netherlands) FRI	(Germany) GUE	(France) JEV	(Switzerland) MUL	(Brazil) SET	(United Kingdom) TIC	(Belgium) VAN	(Germany) WEH

==== Qualifying duels ====
Quarter-finals
A2	(Switzerland) Edoardo Mortara
A3	(United Kingdom) Jake Dennis
A1	(United Kingdom) Oliver Rowland
A4	(New Zealand) Mitch Evans
B2	(Brazil) Sérgio Sette Câmara
B3	(Switzerland) Nico Müller
B1	(Germany) Maximilian Günther
B4	(Germany) Pascal Wehrlein

Semi-finals
(United Kingdom) Oliver Rowland
(Switzerland) Edoardo Mortara
(Germany) Maximilian Günther
(Brazil) Sérgio Sette Câmara

Final
(United Kingdom) Oliver Rowland
(Germany) Maximilian Günther

==== Overall classification ====
Pos.	No.	Driver	Team	A	B	QF	SF	F	Grid
1	22	(United Kingdom) Oliver Rowland	Nissan	1:19.658	—N/a	1:19.164	1:18.855	1:19.023	1
2	7	(Germany) Maximilian Günther	Maserati	—N/a	1:19.391	1:19.252	1:19.046	1:19.044	2
3	48	(Switzerland) Edoardo Mortara	Mahindra	1:19.678	—N/a	1:19.008	1:19.081	—N/a	3
4	3	(Brazil) Sérgio Sette Câmara	ERT	—N/a	1:19.474	1:19.160	1:21.244	—N/a	4
5	1	(United Kingdom) Jake Dennis	Andretti-Porsche	1:19.939	—N/a	1:19.323	—N/a	—N/a	5
6	9	(New Zealand) Mitch Evans	Jaguar	1:19.991	—N/a	1:19.448	—N/a	—N/a	9 (Note: Evans was given a three-place grid penalty for impeding Jake Hughes in qualifying group A.)
7	94	(Germany) Pascal Wehrlein	Porsche	—N/a	1:19.792	1:19.560	—N/a	—N/a	6
8	51	(Switzerland) Nico Müller	ABT Cupra-Mahindra	—N/a	1:19.725	1:19.756	—N/a	—N/a	7
9	13	(Portugal) António Félix da Costa	Porsche	1:20.010	—N/a	—N/a	—N/a	—N/a	8
10	4	(Netherlands) Robin Frijns	Envision-Jaguar	—N/a	1:19.822	—N/a	—N/a	—N/a	10
11	17	(France) Norman Nato	Andretti-Porsche	1:20.056	—N/a	—N/a	—N/a	—N/a	11
12	21	(Netherlands) Nyck de Vries	Mahindra	—N/a	1:19.881	—N/a	—N/a	—N/a	12
13	5	(United Kingdom) Jake Hughes	McLaren-Nissan	1:20.226	—N/a	—N/a	—N/a	—N/a	16 (Note: Hughes was given a three-place grid penalty for impeding Lucas di Grassi in qualifying group A.)
14	25	(France) Jean-Éric Vergne	DS Penske	—N/a	1:19.883	—N/a	—N/a	—N/a	13
15	11	(Brazil) Lucas di Grassi	ABT Cupra-Mahindra	1:20.269	—N/a	—N/a	—N/a	—N/a	14
16	33	(United Kingdom) Dan Ticktum	ERT	—N/a	1:19.952	—N/a	—N/a	—N/a	15
17	18	(India) Jehan Daruvala	Maserati	1:20.395	—N/a	—N/a	—N/a	—N/a	17
18	2	(Belgium) Stoffel Vandoorne	DS Penske	—N/a	1:20.027	—N/a	—N/a	—N/a	18
19	37	(New Zealand) Nick Cassidy	Jaguar	1:20.401	—N/a	—N/a	—N/a	—N/a	19
20	23	(France) Sacha Fenestraz	Nissan	—N/a	1:20.132	—N/a	—N/a	—N/a	20
21	16	(Switzerland) Sébastien Buemi	Envision-Jaguar	1:20.678	—N/a	—N/a	—N/a	—N/a	21 (Note: Buemi was given a three-place grid penalty for impeding Lucas di Grassi in qualifying group A.)
22	8	(United Kingdom) Sam Bird	McLaren-Nissan	—N/a	1:20.660	—N/a	—N/a	—N/a	22 (Note: Bird was given a three-place grid penalty for impeding Jean-Éric Vergne in qualifying group B.)

==== Race ====
The race started at 15:03 on 30 March.

Pos.	No.	Driver	Team	Laps	Time/Retired	Grid	Points
1	7	(Germany) Maximilian Günther	Maserati	35	53:34.665	2	25+1^{2}
2	22	(United Kingdom) Oliver Rowland	Nissan	35	+0.755	1	18+3^{1}
3	1	(United Kingdom) Jake Dennis	Andretti-Porsche	35	+1.405	5	15
4	13	(Portugal) António Félix da Costa	Porsche	35	+1.822	8	12
5	94	(Germany) Pascal Wehrlein	Porsche	35	+3.897	6	10
6	17	(France) Norman Nato	Andretti-Porsche	35	+4.573	11	8
7	51	(Switzerland) Nico Müller	ABT Cupra-Mahindra	35	+4.983	7	6
8	37	(New Zealand) Nick Cassidy	Jaguar	35	+5.542	19	4
9	4	(Netherlands) Robin Frijns	Envision-Jaguar	35	+5.929	10	2
10	3	(Brazil) Sérgio Sette Câmara	ERT	35	+6.504	4	1
11	23	(France) Sacha Fenestraz	Nissan	35	+7.016	20	
12	25	(France) Jean-Éric Vergne	DS Penske	35	+7.583	13	
13	16	(Switzerland) Sébastien Buemi	Envision-Jaguar	35	+8.467	21	
14	5	(United Kingdom) Jake Hughes	McLaren-Nissan	35	+8.859	16	
15	9	(New Zealand) Mitch Evans	Jaguar	35	+9.316	9	
16	2	(Belgium) Stoffel Vandoorne	DS Penske	35	+9.735	18	
17	18	(India) Jehan Daruvala	Maserati	35	+15.096	17	
18	33	(United Kingdom) Dan Ticktum	ERT	35	+49.418	15	
19	8	(United Kingdom) Sam Bird	McLaren-Nissan	34	+1 lap (Note: Bird retired in the pit lane on lap 34, but was still classified in the final results as he completed more than 90% of the race distance.)	22	
Ret	11	(Brazil) Lucas di Grassi	ABT Cupra-Mahindra	17	Retired in pits	14	
Ret	21	(Netherlands) Nyck de Vries	Mahindra	17	Retired in pits	12	
DSQ	48	(Switzerland) Edoardo Mortara	Mahindra	35	Disqualified (Note: Mortara was disqualified after the conclusion of the race for illegal energy usage above the maximum of 32 kWh.)	3	

Notes:

- ^1 – Pole position.
- ^2 – Fastest lap.

==== Standings after the race ====
Drivers' Championship standings

	Pos	Driver	Points
1	1	(Germany) Pascal Wehrlein	63
1	2	(New Zealand) Nick Cassidy	61
4	3	(United Kingdom) Oliver Rowland	54
1	4	(United Kingdom) Jake Dennis	53
3	5	(Germany) Maximilian Günther	48

Teams' Championship standings

	Pos	Team	Points
	1	(United Kingdom) Jaguar	100
	2	(Germany) Porsche	83
2	3	(United States) Andretti	70
2	4	(Japan) Nissan	62
2	5	(United States) DS Penske	57

Manufacturers' Trophy standings

	Pos	Manufacturer	Points
	1	(United Kingdom) Jaguar	129
	2	(Germany) Porsche	122
	3	(Japan) Nissan	109
	4	(Netherlands) Stellantis	97
1	5	(India) Mahindra	6

- Notes: Only the top five positions are included for all three sets of standings.

== Notes ==
Previous race: 2024 São Paulo ePrix (March)	FIA Formula E World Championship; 2023–24 season	Next race: 2024 Misano ePrix
Previous race: N/A	Tokyo ePrix	Next race: 2025 Tokyo ePrix
