= Tokyo Street Circuit =

Street circuit in Tokyo, Japan

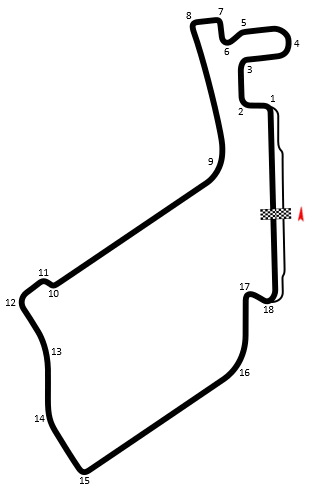
- Formula E Circuit (2025–present)

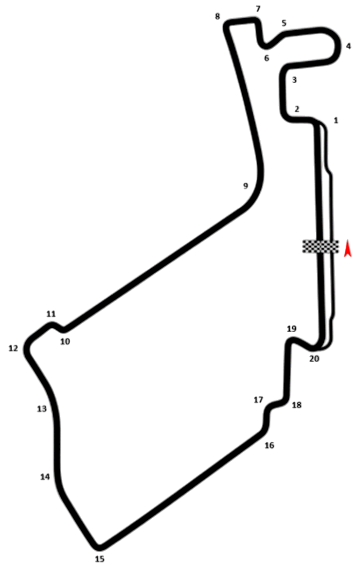
- Original Formula E Circuit (2024)
- Location: Tokyo International Exhibition Centre, Tokyo, Japan
- Coordinates: 35°38′00″N 139°48′02″E
- FIA Grade: 3E
- Opened: 29 March 2024; 2 years ago
- Major events: Current: Formula E Tokyo ePrix (2024–present)

Formula E Circuit (2025–present)
- Length: 2.575 km (1.600 mi)
- Turns: 18
- Race lap record: 1:13.251 ( (United Kingdom) Dan Ticktum, Porsche 99X Electric WCG3, 2026, F-E)

Original Formula E Circuit (2024)
- Length: 2.585 km (1.606 mi)
- Turns: 20
- Race lap record: 1:19.731 ( (United Kingdom) Sam Bird, Nissan e-4ORCE 04, 2024, F-E)

The Tokyo Street Circuit is a 2.575 km (1.600 mi) street circuit located around the Tokyo International Exhibition Centre in the Japanese capital that hosts the Tokyo ePrix, a round of the Formula E electric formula racing series. The inaugural edition in 2024 became the first international-championship street race to be hosted on closed public roads in the city.

== History ==
The Tokyo Street Circuit was unveiled on October 25, 2023, representing the first time the electric category will compete in Japan. The event has been seen as a way to achieve the city's goal of ensuring that all new cars are gasoline-free by 2030, with city governor Yuriko Koike stating that "the championships will provide impetus to spread the zero-emission vehicles." The circuit takes places around the Tokyo Big Sight convention center.
