= 2026 Tokyo ePrix =

Race 14 of 17 of the 2025–26 Formula E season
← Previous race	Next race →
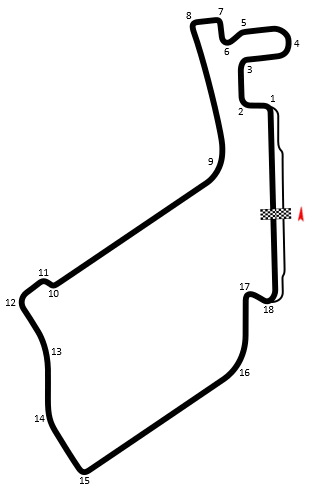

Race details
- Date: 25 July 2026
- Official name: 2026 TDK Tokyo ePrix
- Location: Tokyo Street Circuit, Tokyo, Japan
- Course: Street Circuit
- Course length: 2.575 km (1.600 mi)
- Scheduled distance: 36 laps, 92.70 km (57.60 mi)

Pole position
Driver	(United Kingdom) Jake Dennis	Andretti-Porsche
- Time: 1:11:863

Fastest lap
Driver	(United Kingdom) Dan Ticktum	Cupra Kiro-Porsche
- Time: 1:13.251

Podium
First	(United Kingdom) Dan Ticktum	Cupra Kiro-Porsche
Second	(United Kingdom) Jake Dennis	Andretti-Porsche
Third	(New Zealand) Nick Cassidy	Citroën

2026 Tokyo ePrix
Race 15 of 17 of the 2025–26 Formula E season
← Previous race	Next race →
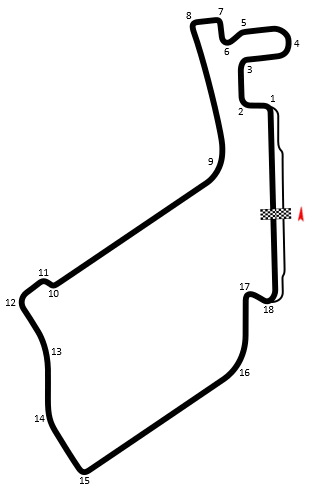

Race details
- Date: 26 July 2026
- Official name: 2026 TDK Tokyo ePrix
- Location: Tokyo Street Circuit, Tokyo, Japan
- Course: Street Circuit
- Course length: 2.575 km (1.600 mi)
- Scheduled distance: 35 laps, 90.12 km (56.00 mi)

Pole position
Driver	(Switzerland) Edoardo Mortara	Mahindra
- Time: 1:14.216

Fastest lap
Driver	(United Kingdom) Jake Dennis	Andretti-Porsche
- Time: 1:14.528

Podium
First	(Netherlands) Nyck de Vries	Mahindra
Second	(New Zealand) Nick Cassidy	Citroën
Third	(United Kingdom) Jake Dennis	Andretti-Porsche

The 2026 Tokyo ePrix (formally the 2026 TDK Tokyo E-Prix) was the fourteenth and fifteenth race of the 2025–26 Formula E World Championship, held on 25–26 July 2026. It was the third running of the Tokyo ePrix, held around the Tokyo Street Circuit.

== Background ==
Pascal Wehrlein entered the race as the leader in the Drivers' Championship with a 9 point lead over Mitch Evans, followed by defending champion Oliver Rowland (27 points behind).

Prior to the race, Jaguar held a 6 point lead over Porsche in the Teams' Championship, with Andretti in third and Mahindra in fourth. In the Manufacturers' Trophy, Porsche held a 29 point lead over Jaguar, with Stellantis in third.

== Classification ==
All times are in Japan Standard Time (JST).

=== Race 1 ===
==== Qualifying ====
Qualification took place at 15:40 on 25 July.

Group draw
Group A	(Germany) WEH	(United Kingdom) ROW	(United Kingdom) DEN	(Switzerland) MUE	(New Zealand) CAS	(Brazil) DRU	(Sweden) ERI	(Brazil) DIG	(United Kingdom) BAR	(France) NAT
Group B	(New Zealand) EVA	(Portugal) DAC	(Switzerland) MOR	(Switzerland) BUE	(Netherlands) DEV	(Spain) MAR	(France) JEV	(United Kingdom) TIC	(Germany) GUE	(Barbados) MAL

===== Qualifying duels =====
Quarter-finals
A2	(Switzerland) Nico Müller
A3	(New Zealand) Nick Cassidy
A1	(United Kingdom) Jake Dennis
A4	(United Kingdom) Taylor Barnard
B2	(Switzerland) Edoardo Mortara
B3	(France) Jean-Éric Vergne
B1	(Portugal) Antonio Felix da Costa
B4	(United Kingdom) Dan Ticktum

Semi-finals
(Switzerland) Nico Müller
(United Kingdom) Jake Dennis
(Switzerland) Edoardo Mortara
(Portugal) Antonio Felix da Costa

Final
(United Kingdom) Jake Dennis
(Switzerland) Edoardo Mortara

===== Overall Classification =====
Source:

==== Race ====
The race started at 20:05 on 25 July.

==== Standings after the race ====
Drivers' Championship standings

	Pos	Driver	Points
1	1	(New Zealand) Mitch Evans	144
1	2	(Germany) Pascal Wehrlein	141
2	3	(United Kingdom) Jake Dennis	130
1	4	(United Kingdom) Oliver Rowland	120
1	5	(Portugal) António Félix da Costa	113

Teams' Championship standings

	Pos	Team	Points
	1	(United Kingdom) Jaguar	257
	2	(Germany) Porsche	237
	3	(United States) Andretti	195
	4	(India) Mahindra	182
2	5	(France) Citroën	138

Manufacturers' Championship standings

Pos	Manufacturer	Points
1	(Germany) Porsche	427
2	(United Kingdom) Jaguar	350
3	(Netherlands) Stellantis	215
4	(India) Mahindra	183
5	(Japan) Nissan	158

- Notes: Only the top five positions are included for all three sets of standings.

=== Race 2 ===
==== Qualifying ====
Qualification took place at 15:40 on 26 July.

Group draw
Group A	(New Zealand) EVA	(United Kingdom) DEN	(Portugal) DAC	(Switzerland) MUE	(Switzerland) BUE	(Brazil) DRU	(Sweden) ERI	(France) JEV	(United Kingdom) BAR	(France) NAT
Group B	(Germany) WEH	(United Kingdom) ROW	(Switzerland) MOR	(New Zealand) CAS	(Netherlands) DEV	(Spain) MAR	(United Kingdom) TIC	(Brazil) DIG	(Germany) GUE	(Barbados) MAL

===== Qualifying duels =====
Quarter-finals
A2	(New Zealand) Mitch Evans
A3	(United Kingdom) Taylor Barnard
A1	(Portugal) Antonio Felix da Costa
A4	(France) Norman Nato
B2	(Netherlands) Nyck de Vries
B3	(United Kingdom) Dan Ticktum
B1	(Switzerland) Edoardo Mortara
B4	(United Kingdom) Oliver Rowland

Semi-finals
(United Kingdom) Taylor Barnard
(Portugal) Antonio Felix da Costa
(United Kingdom) Dan Ticktum
(Switzerland) Edoardo Mortara

Final
(Portugal) Antonio Felix da Costa
(Switzerland) Edoardo Mortara

==== Race ====
The race started at 20:05 on 26 July.

==== Standings after the race ====
Drivers' Championship standings

	Pos	Driver	Points
2	1	(United Kingdom) Jake Dennis	146
1	2	(New Zealand) Mitch Evans	144
1	3	(Germany) Pascal Wehrlein	141
	4	(United Kingdom) Oliver Rowland	132
1	5	(Switzerland) Edoardo Mortara	116

Teams' Championship standings

Pos	Team	Points
1	(United Kingdom) Jaguar	257
2	(Germany) Porsche	243
3	(United States) Andretti	211
4	(India) Mahindra	210
5	(France) Citroën	166

Manufacturers' Championship standings

Pos	Manufacturer	Points
1	(Germany) Porsche	448
2	(United Kingdom) Jaguar	351
3	(Netherlands) Stellantis	243
4	(India) Mahindra	208
5	(Japan) Nissan	178

- Notes: Only the top five positions are included for all three sets of standings.

Previous race: 2026 Shanghai ePrix	FIA Formula E World Championship; 2025–26 season	Next race: 2026 London ePrix
Previous race: 2025 Tokyo ePrix	Tokyo ePrix	Next race: 2027 Tokyo ePrix
