= 2026 London ePrix =

Race 16 of 17 of the 2025–26 Formula E season
← Previous race
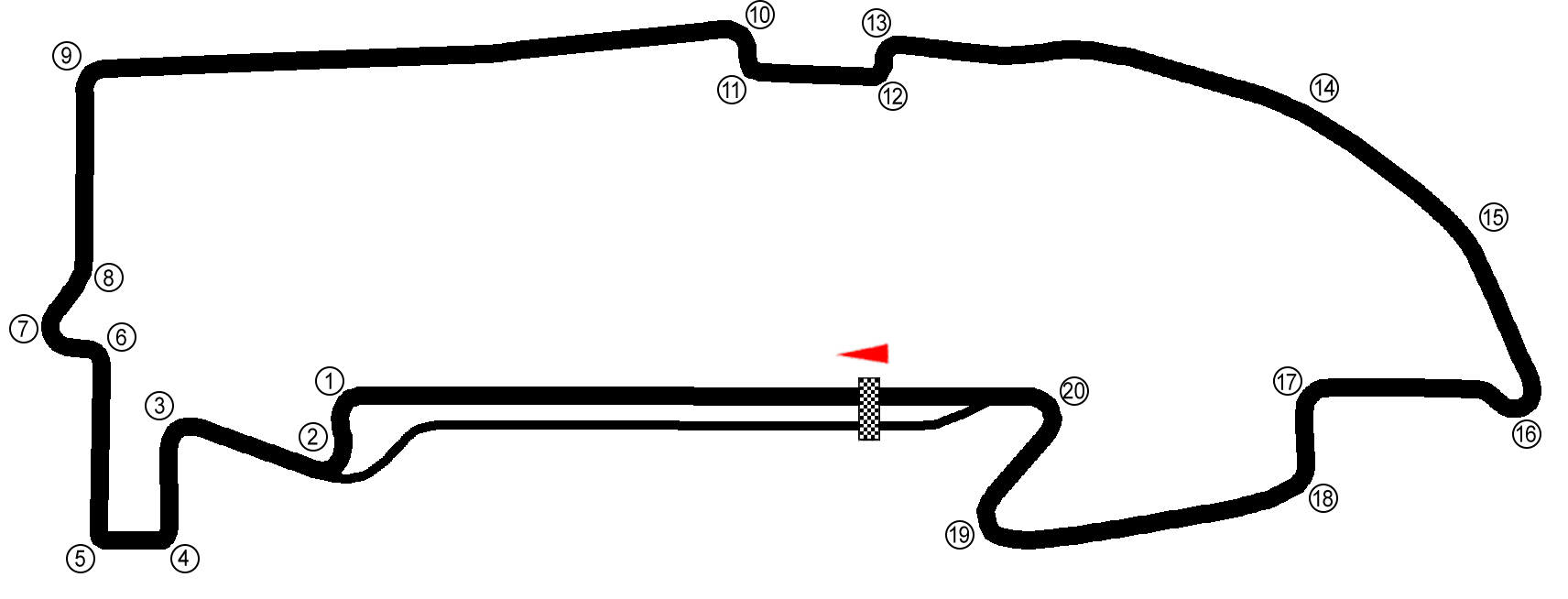

Race details
- Date: 15 August 2026
- Official name: 2026 Hankook London E-Prix
- Location: ExCeL London Circuit, Royal Docks, Newham, London
- Course: Street circuit
- Course length: 2.086 km (1.296 mi)

Pole position
Driver	(Germany) Pascal Wehrlein	Porsche
- Time: 1:07:587

Fastest lap
Driver	(United Kingdom) Oliver Rowland	Nissan
- Time: 1:08.305

Podium
First	(Germany) Pascal Wehrlein	Porsche
Second	(United Kingdom) Jake Dennis	Andretti-Porsche
Third	(Portugal) António Félix da Costa	Jaguar

2026 London ePrix
Race 17 of 17 of the 2025–26 Formula E season
← Previous race
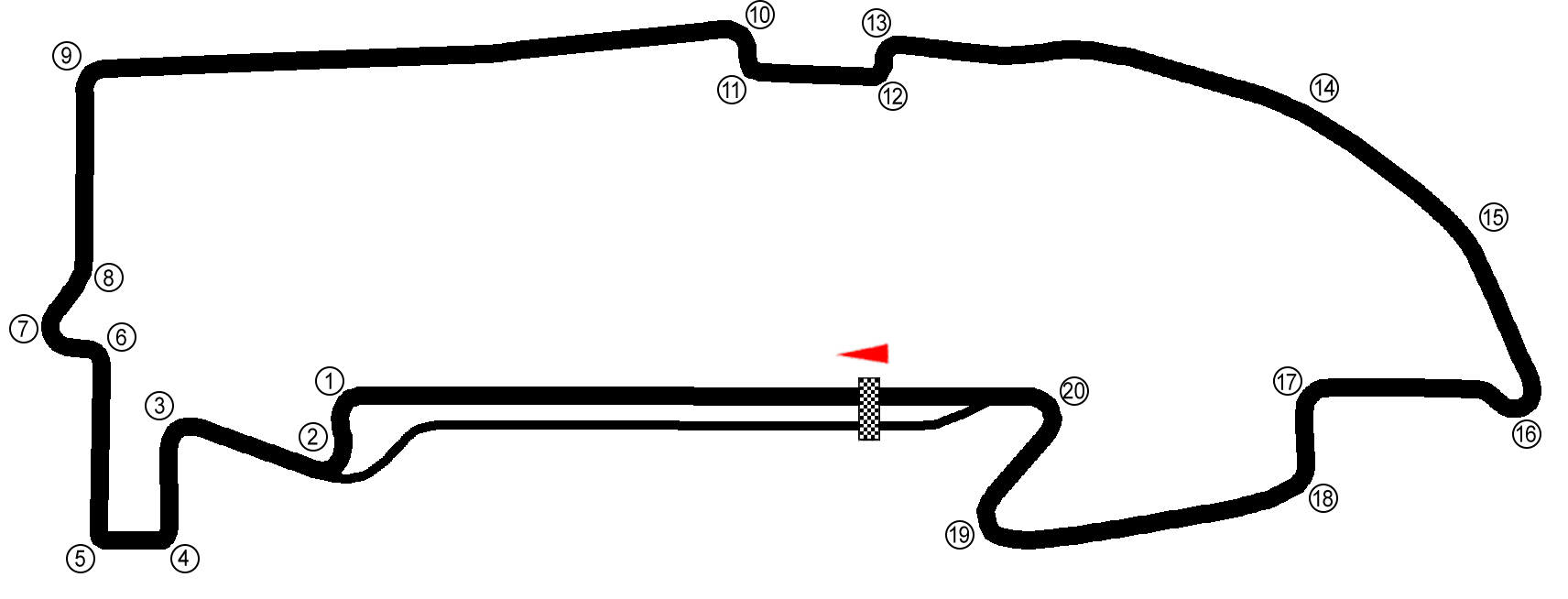

Race details
- Date: 16 August 2026
- Official name: 2026 Hankook London E-Prix
- Location: ExCeL London Circuit, Royal Docks, Newham, London
- Course: Street circuit
- Course length: 2.086 km (1.296 mi)

Pole position
Driver	(Netherlands) Nyck de Vries	Mahindra
- Time: 1:06.925

Fastest lap
Driver	(United Kingdom) Dan Ticktum	Cupra Kiro-Porsche
- Time: 1:08.135

Podium
First	(United Kingdom) Taylor Barnard	DS Penske
Second	(Netherlands) Nyck de Vries	Mahindra
Third	(Switzerland) Edoardo Mortara	Mahindra

The 2026 London ePrix, known for sponsorship reasons as the 2026 Hankook London E-Prix, was a pair of Formula E electric car races held at the ExCeL London Circuit in the Royal Docks area of Newham, London on 15 and 16 August 2026. They served as the 16th and 17th rounds of the 2025–26 Formula E season, the 8th running of the London ePrix, and the last event hosted at Excel.

Pascal Wehrlein won the first race, while Taylor Barnard won the second race. Jake Dennis and António Félix da Costa completed the first race's podium, while the final podium place was taken by Nyck de Vries in race one and by Edoardo Mortara in race two.

Wehrlein would go on to win the Drivers' Championship while Jaguar TCS Racing would win the Teams' Championships in this race.

== Background ==
Porsche had already secured the Manufacturers' Champion at the previous race weekend in Tokyo, but the Teams' Championship and Drivers' Championship are both up for contention, with Jake Dennis leading the Drivers' Championship and Jaguar leading the Teams' Championship going into London.

The Drivers' championship involved 9 drivers in contention: Jake Dennis, Mitch Evans, Pascal Wehrlein, Oliver Rowland, Edoardo Mortara, António Félix da Costa, Nick Cassidy, Nico Müller, and Nyck de Vries.

== Classification ==
(All times are in BST)

=== Race 1 ===
==== Qualifying ====
Qualifying for race 1 took place at 10:40 AM on 15 August.

Group draw
Group A	(United Kingdom) DEN	(Germany) WEH	(Switzerland) MOR	(New Zealand) CAS	(Netherlands) DEV	(Brazil) DRU	(France) JEV	(United Kingdom) TIC	(Brazil) DIG	(France) NAT
Group B	(New Zealand) EVA	(United Kingdom) ROW	(Portugal) DAC	(Switzerland) MUE	(Switzerland) BUE	(Spain) MAR	(Sweden) ERI	(United Kingdom) BAR	(Germany) GUE	(Barbados) MAL

==== Race ====
Race 1 started at 3:05 PM on 15 August.

==== Standings after the race ====
Drivers' Championship standings

	Pos	Driver	Points
2	1	(Germany) Pascal Wehrlein	169
1	2	(United Kingdom) Jake Dennis	164
1	3	(New Zealand) Mitch Evans	148
	4	(United Kingdom) Oliver Rowland	134
1	5	(Portugal) António Félix da Costa	128

Teams' Championship standings

Pos	Team	Points
1	(United Kingdom) Jaguar	276
2	(Germany) Porsche	271
3	(United States) Andretti	229
4	(India) Mahindra	216
5	(France) Citroën	168

Manufacturers' Championship standings

Pos	Manufacturer	Points
1	(Germany) Porsche	491
2	(United Kingdom) Jaguar	378
3	(Netherlands) Stellantis	259
4	(India) Mahindra	218
5	(Japan) Nissan	183

- Notes: Only the top five positions are included for all three sets of standings.

=== Race 2 ===
==== Qualifying ====
Qualifying for race 2 started at 10:40 AM on 16 August.

Group draw
Group A	(Germany) WEH	(New Zealand) EVA	(Portugal) DAC	(New Zealand) CAS	(Netherlands) DEV	(Brazil) DRU	(Spain) MAR	(Sweden) ERI	(Brazil) DIG	(France) NAT
Group B	(United Kingdom) DEN	(United Kingdom) ROW	(Switzerland) MOR	(Switzerland) MUE	(Switzerland) BUE	(United Kingdom) TIC	(France) JEV	(United Kingdom) BAR	(Germany) GUE	(Barbados) MAL

==== Race ====
Race 2 started at 3:05 PM on 16 August.

==== Standings after the race ====
Drivers' Championship standings

	Pos	Driver	Points
	1	(Germany) Pascal Wehrlein	169
	2	(United Kingdom) Jake Dennis	164
	3	(New Zealand) Mitch Evans	160
	4	(United Kingdom) Oliver Rowland	137
1	5	(Switzerland) Edoardo Mortara	137

Teams' Championship standings

	Pos	Team	Points
	1	(United Kingdom) Jaguar	288
	2	(Germany) Porsche	271
1	3	(India) Mahindra	252
1	4	(United States) Andretti	229
	5	(France) Citroën	182

Manufacturers' Championship standings

Pos	Manufacturer	Points
1	(Germany) Porsche	498
2	(United Kingdom) Jaguar	400
3	(Netherlands) Stellantis	292
4	(India) Mahindra	251
5	(Japan) Nissan	189

- Notes: Only the top five positions are included for all three sets of standings.

== Notes ==
Previous race: 2026 Tokyo ePrix	FIA Formula E World Championship; 2025–26 season	Next race: 2027 Mexico City ePrix
Previous race: 2025 London ePrix	London ePrix	Next race: 2027 London ePrix
