= Mauro Calamia =

Swiss racing driver

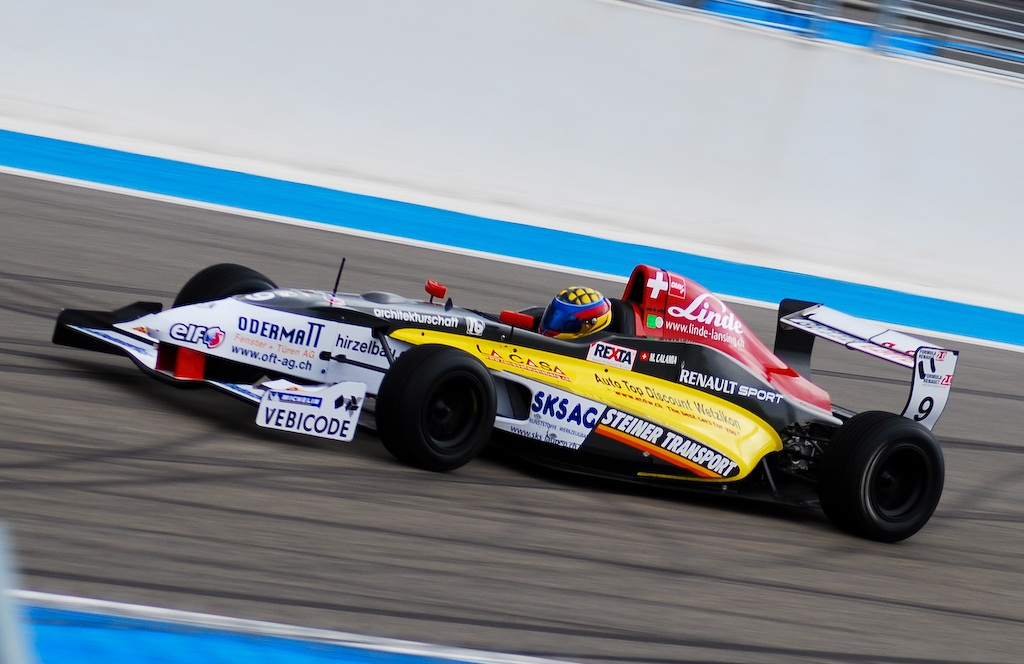
- Calamia at Circuit Paul Ricard in 2011
- Nationality: (Switzerland) Swiss
- Born: 20 January 1992 (age 34) Laupen, Zürich Canton, Switzerland
- Categorisation: FIA Silver

Previous series
- 2012 2011 2009–10: FIA Formula Two Championship; Formula Renault 2.0 Alps; Formula Lista Junior

Mauro Calamia (born 20 January 1992) is a racing driver from Switzerland.

== Career ==
=== Karting ===
Born in Laupen ZH, Calamia began karting in 2004 and raced primarily in his native Switzerland for the majority of his career, working his way up from the junior ranks to progress through to the KF2 category by 2008.

=== Formula Lista Junior ===
In 2009, Calamia graduated to single–seaters, racing in the Formula Lista Junior series in Europe for Daltec Racing. He finished tenth, scoring a podium finish at Monza. He remained in the series for the 2010 season, moving to Torino Motorsport, but finished the season in eleventh place in the championship.

=== Formula Renault ===
Calamia switched to the newly created Formula Renault 2.0 Alps series in 2011, returning to Daltec Racing. He finished all but one races in a points-scoring position, finishing tenth in the Drivers' Championship. He also contested the Most round of the Formula Renault 2.0 NEC series.

=== FIA Formula Two Championship ===
In 2012, Calamia graduated into the FIA Formula Two Championship.

== Racing record ==
=== Career summary ===
Season	Series	Team	Races	Wins	Poles	F/Laps	Podiums	Points	Position
2009	Formula Lista Junior	Daltec Racing	12	0	0	1	1	34	10th
2010	Formula Lista Junior	Torino Motorsport	12	0	0	0	0	36	11th
2011	Formula Renault 2.0 Alps	Daltec Racing	12	0	0	0	0	36	10th
2011	Formula Renault 2.0 NEC	Daltec Racing	3	0	0	0	0	25	34th
2012	FIA Formula Two Championship	Motorsport Vision	12	0	0	0	0	2	18th
2013	Trofeo Maserati World Series		15	0	0	1	5	144	5th
2014	Trofeo Maserati World Series		?	?	?	?	?	?	**1st**
2015	Euro Series by Nova Race	Swiss Team	2	0	0	0	2	36	13th
2015	International GT Open - GTAM	Swiss Team	2	0	0	0	0	0	13th
2015	Italian GT Championship - GT3	Autorlando Sport	14	0	0	0	0	27	23rd
2016	GT4 European Series - Pro	Swiss Team	12	0	0	0	1	69	10th
2017	International GT Open - Pro	Solaris Motorsport	8	0	0	0	0	8	20th
2017	International GT Open - Pro	SPS Automotive Performance	2	0	0	0	0	8	20th
2017	24H Series - A6	GRT Grasser Racing Team							
2018	24H GT Series - A6	GRT Grasser Racing Team							
2018	24H GT Series - A6	Swiss Team							
2019	Blancpain GT Series Endurance Cup	Scuderia Villorba Corse	2	0	0	0	0	0	NC
2019	Le Mans Cup - GT3	Scuderia Villorba Corse	6	0	0	0	0	11.5	12th
2019	24H GT Series - GT4	Scuderia Villorba Corse							
2020	GT World Challenge Europe Endurance Cup	Dinamic Motorsport	1	0	0	0	0	0	NC
2020	Italian GT Endurance Championship - GT3	Dinamic Motorsport	1	0	0	0	0	0	NC
2020	24H GT Series - GT3	Dinamic Motorsport							
2021	24H GT Series - GT3	Dinamic Motorsport							
2021	24 Hours of Nürburgring - SP10	Schmickler Performance	1	0	0	0	0	N/A	4th
2022	GT World Challenge Europe Endurance Cup	Dinamic Motorsport	3	0	0	0	0	0	NC
2022	24H GT Series - GT3	Dinamic Motorsport							
2022	24 Hours of Nürburgring - Cup 3	Schmickler Performance powered by Ravenol	1	1	0	0	1	N/A	**1st**
2024	GT2 European Series - Pro-Am	Dinamic Motorsport							
2025	GT2 European Series - Pro-Am	Dinamic Motorsport							
2025-26	24H Series Middle East - GT3	SVC Sport Management							
2026	24H Series - GTX	Dinamic Motorsport							
2026	GT2 European Series - Pro-Am	Dinamic Motorsport							

=== Complete Formula Renault 2.0 NEC results ===
(key) (Races in bold indicate pole position) (Races in italics indicate fastest lap)

Year	Entrant	1	2	3	4	5	6	7	8	9	10	11	12	13	14	15	16	17	18	19	20	DC	Points
2011	Daltec Racing	HOC; 1	HOC; 2	HOC; 3	SPA; 1	SPA; 2	NÜR; 1	NÜR; 2	ASS; 1	ASS; 2	ASS; 3	OSC; 1	OSC; 2	ZAN; 1	ZAN; 2	MST; 1; 8	MST; 2 Ret	MST; 3; 9	MNZ; 1	MNZ; 2	MNZ; 3	34th	25

=== Complete Formula Renault 2.0 Alps Series results ===
(key) (Races in bold indicate pole position; races in italics indicate fastest lap)

Year	Team	1	2	3	4	5	6	7	8	9	10	11	12	13	14	Pos	Points
2011	Daltec Racing	MNZ; 1; 10	MNZ; 2; 8	IMO; 1; 8	IMO; 2; 12	PAU; 1; 13	PAU; 2 Ret	RBR; 1; 15	RBR; 2; 10	HUN; 1; 13	HUN; 2; 12	LEC; 1; 8	LEC; 2; 10	SPA; 1; 8	SPA; 2; 7	10th	125

=== Complete FIA Formula Two Championship results ===
(key) (Races in bold indicate pole position) (Races in italics indicate fastest lap)

Year	1	2	3	4	5	6	7	8	9	10	11	12	13	14	15	16	Pos	Points
2012	SIL; 1; 14	SIL; 2; 12	ALG; 1; 12	ALG; 2; 11	NÜR; 1; 15	NÜR; 2; 13	SPA; 1; 12	SPA; 2; 14	BRH; 1; 9	BRH; 2; 11	LEC; 1; 11	LEC; 2; 11	HUN; 1	HUN; 2	MNZ; 1	MNZ; 2	18th	2
