= 2011 Eurocup Formula Renault 2.0 =

Motor racing competition

Seasons
- ← 2010 2012 →

The 2011 Eurocup Formula Renault 2.0 season was the 21st Eurocup Formula Renault 2.0 season. The season commenced on 16 April at Alcañiz and ended on 9 October in Barcelona. The season features seven double-header rounds, with each race lasting for a duration of 30 minutes. All races were part of the World Series by Renault.

Josef Kaufmann Racing's Robin Frijns who is also the last Formula BMW Europe champion won five races on his way to the championship by a 45-point margin over another former Formula BMW driver Carlos Sainz Jr., who won the opening race on Ciudad del Motor de Aragón and Circuit de Spa-Francorchamps. Frijns finished in the top five in every race. The same point margin was between Sainz and his third placed teammate Daniil Kvyat, who also won two races on Circuit de Spa-Francorchamps and Nürburgring. Other wins were scored by Will Stevens, Alex Riberas, Javier Tarancón and FIA Institute Young Driver Excellence Academy drivers Timmy Hansen and Paul-Loup Chatin.

== Regulation changes ==
=== Sporting ===
- The points system for the 2011 season changed to reflect the system used by the FIA for the World championships. The top ten drivers in each race were awarded points as follows: 25, 18, 15, 12, 10, 8, 6, 4, 2, and 1.
- The series adopted a format introduced in the 2010 Formula Renault 3.5 Series season with one qualifying and race each day.

== Teams and drivers ==
- At Spa, competitors from the Formula Renault 2.0 Northern European Cup joined the Eurocup runners in each of the sessions to be held, running as guest drivers ineligible for points. These entries are listed in italics.

Team	No.	Driver name	Class	Rounds
(France) Tech 1 Racing	1	(Spain) Javier Tarancón		All
(France) Tech 1 Racing	2	(France) Paul-Loup Chatin		All
(France) Tech 1 Racing	3	(France) Grégoire Demoustier		1–2
(France) Tech 1 Racing	3	(United Kingdom) Mitchell Gilbert		7
(France) Tech 1 Racing	4	(Finland) Miki Weckström		All
(Finland) Koiranen Motorsport	5	(Spain) Carlos Sainz Jr.	J	All
(Finland) Koiranen Motorsport	6	(Russia) Daniil Kvyat	J	All
(Finland) Koiranen Motorsport	7	(Finland) Joni Wiman	J	1–4
(Finland) Koiranen Motorsport	7	(Estonia) Hans Villemi	J	5–7
(Finland) Koiranen Motorsport	8	(Sweden) John Bryant-Meisner	J	All
(Finland) Koiranen Motorsport	70	(Estonia) Hans Villemi	J	3
(Austria) Interwetten.com Racing Junior Team	9	(Sweden) Timmy Hansen		All
(Austria) Interwetten.com Racing Junior Team	10	(Austria) Thomas Jäger	J	1–2
(Austria) Interwetten.com Racing Junior Team	10	(Switzerland) Christof von Grünigen		3
(Austria) Interwetten.com Racing Junior Team	10	(United States) Gustavo Menezes	J	4–5, 7
(Austria) Interwetten.com Racing Junior Team	11	(United States) Gustavo Menezes	J	2
(Austria) Interwetten.com Racing Junior Team	11	(Brazil) João Jardim		1
(Austria) Interwetten.com Racing Junior Team	11	(Thailand) Sandy Stuvik	J	5–7
(Austria) Interwetten.com Racing Junior Team	78	(Italy) Cristiano Marcellan		7
(Spain) EPIC Racing	14	(Spain) Alex Riberas	J	All
(Spain) EPIC Racing	15	(France) Florian Le Roux		1–2, 4–7
(Spain) EPIC Racing	16	(Italy) Stefano Colombo		6
(Spain) EPIC Racing	17	(Austria) Thomas Jäger	J	3–4
(Netherlands) MP Motorsport	18	(Sweden) Kevin Kleveros		1–4, 6–7
(Netherlands) MP Motorsport	19	(Estonia) Johannes Moor		All
(Netherlands) MP Motorsport	20	(Estonia) Karl-Oscar Liiv	J	All
(Netherlands) MP Motorsport	76	(Russia) Alexey Chuklin		2, 5, 7
(Czech Republic) Krenek Motorsport	21	(Slovakia) Richard Gonda	J	All
(Italy) Cram Competition	22	(Brazil) Henrique Martins		All
(Italy) Cram Competition	23	(Russia) Denis Nagulin		All
(Italy) Cram Competition	77	(Italy) Giorgio Roda		7
(Italy) One Racing	24	(Italy) Vittorio Ghirelli	J	All
(Italy) One Racing	25	(Italy) Edolo Ghirelli		All
(France) Boetti Racing Team	26	(Russia) Roman Mavlanov	J	All
(United Kingdom) Fortec Motorsport	27	(Puerto Rico) Félix Serrallés		All
(United Kingdom) Fortec Motorsport	28	(United Kingdom) Will Stevens		All
(United Kingdom) Fortec Motorsport	29	(Malaysia) Fahmi Ilyas		2
(United Kingdom) Fortec Motorsport	29	(United Kingdom) Mitchell Gilbert		4
(United Kingdom) Fortec Motorsport	29	(United Arab Emirates) Ed Jones		5–7
(United Kingdom) Fortec Motorsport	72	(United Kingdom) Alex Lynn		4–5
(United Kingdom) Fortec Motorsport	73	(United Kingdom) Mitchell Gilbert		5
(France) R-ace GP	30	(France) Côme Ledogar		All
(France) R-ace GP	31	(Netherlands) Pieter Schothorst		All
(France) R-ace GP	32	(France) Norman Nato		All
(Germany) Josef Kaufmann Racing	33	(France) Mathieu Jaminet	J	All
(Germany) Josef Kaufmann Racing	34	(Netherlands) Robin Frijns		All
(Germany) Josef Kaufmann Racing	35	(Colombia) Óscar Andrés Tunjo	J	All
(Belgium) KTR	36	(Belgium) Stoffel Vandoorne		All
(Belgium) KTR	37	(Netherlands) Liroy Stuart		1–2
(Belgium) KTR	37	(United Kingdom) Jack Hawksworth		4
(Belgium) KTR	37	(Netherlands) Meindert van Buuren	J	5–7
(Denmark) KEO Racing	38	(Thailand) Sandy Stuvik	J	1–4
(Denmark) KEO Racing	38	(Denmark) Johan Jokinen		7
(Denmark) KEO Racing	39	(Denmark) Dear Schilling	J	1
(Denmark) KEO Racing	39	(Sweden) Ronnie Lundströmer	J	3–5
(France) ARTA Engineering	40	(France) Yann Zimmer		All
(France) ARTA Engineering	71	(United Kingdom) Melville McKee		3, 5–6
(Netherlands) Van Amersfoort Racing	74	(Netherlands) Dennis van de Laar		5
(Netherlands) Van Amersfoort Racing	110	(Netherlands) Meindert van Buuren	J	2
(Netherlands) Van Amersfoort Racing	111	(Netherlands) Dennis van de Laar		2
(Italy) Torino Motorsport	75	(Italy) Kevin Gilardoni	J	6
(Germany) SL Formula Racing	114	(Belgium) Alessio Picariello	J	2
(Germany) SL Formula Racing	115	(Germany) Sebastian von Gartzen	J	2
(Belgium) Speedlover	120	(Netherlands) Frank Suntjens		2
(Belgium) Speedlover	124	(Israel) Rafael Danieli	J	2
(Finland) P1 Motorsport	121	(Finland) Harri Salminen		2
(Finland) Koiranen Junior	122	(Estonia) Hans Villemi	J	2
(Poland) Inter Europol Competition	125	(Poland) Jakub Śmiechowski		2
(Sweden) Trackstar	144	(Sweden) Victor Bouveng	J	2

Icon	Class
J	Junior Class

=== Driver changes ===
Changed teams

- After driving for Epsilon Euskadi in his rookie season, Javier Tarancón switched to Tech 1 Racing. Miki Weckström moved from Koiranen Bros. Motorsport his team-mate.

Entering/Re-Entering Eurocup Formula Renault 2.0

- Josef Kaufmann Racing signed Formula BMW Europe champion Robin Frijns, F4 Eurocup 1.6 third-placed Mathieu Jaminet and Formula BMW Pacific runner-up Óscar Andrés Tunjo.
- KTR have signed F4 Eurocup 1.6 champion Stoffel Vandoorne and Liroy Stuart to compete for the team.
- Red Bull Junior Team's drivers Daniil Kvyat and Carlos Sainz Jr. will move into the championship, having raced in Formula BMW Europe for EuroInternational. They will drive for defending drivers' champions Koiranen Bros. Motorsport. Joni Wiman will move up from ADAC Formel Masters and John Bryant Meisner from Formula Renault NEZ to complete Koiranen's four-car team.
- Timmy Hansen and Côme Ledogar will also move from Formula BMW Europe to compete for Interwetten.com Racing Junior Team and R-ace GP respectively.
- Formula Renault UK driver Will Stevens will rejoin Fortec Motorsport, having competed at the Hungaroring in 2010 with Manor Competition. He will be joined by Skip Barber National Championship driver Félix Serrallés, with Fahmi Ilyas joining the team at Spa for the experience ahead of the British F3 round later in the season.
- Paul-Loup Chatin and Grégoire Demoustier moved from the F4 Eurocup and French GT Championship respectively to drive for Tech 1 Racing.
- Thomas Jäger will compete in formulae cars for the first time, competing for the Interwetten.com Racing Junior Team. Gustavo Menezes joined the team from Star Mazda at the Spa round.
- After Russian ice racing and two seasons in Finnish Legends Trophy, Denis Nagulin will join Cram Competition.
- Pieter Schothorst stepped up from Formula Ford Duratec Benelux to race for R-ace GP.
- Asian Formula Renault champion Sandy Stuvik moved to Europe to compete for KEO Racing.

== Race calendar and results ==
The calendar for the 2011 season was announced on 11 October 2010, the day after the end of the 2010 season. All seven rounds will form meetings of the 2011 World Series by Renault season.

Round		Circuit	Date	Pole position	Fastest lap	Winning driver	Winning team
1	R1	(Spain) Ciudad del Motor de Aragón, Alcañiz	16 April	(United Kingdom) Will Stevens	(Spain) Carlos Sainz Jr.	(Spain) Carlos Sainz Jr.	(Finland) Koiranen Motorsport
1	R2	(Spain) Ciudad del Motor de Aragón, Alcañiz	17 April	(United Kingdom) Will Stevens	(France) Côme Ledogar	(United Kingdom) Will Stevens	(United Kingdom) Fortec Motorsport
2	R1	(Belgium) Circuit de Spa-Francorchamps	30 April	(Netherlands) Robin Frijns	(Spain) Carlos Sainz Jr.	(Spain) Carlos Sainz Jr.	(Finland) Koiranen Motorsport
2	R2	(Belgium) Circuit de Spa-Francorchamps	1 May	(Spain) Carlos Sainz Jr.	(Spain) Javier Tarancón	(Russia) Daniil Kvyat	(Finland) Koiranen Motorsport
3	R1	(Germany) Nürburgring	18 June	(United Kingdom) Will Stevens	(Spain) Carlos Sainz Jr.	(Netherlands) Robin Frijns	(Germany) Josef Kaufmann Racing
3	R2	(Germany) Nürburgring	19 June	(Russia) Daniil Kvyat	(Spain) Carlos Sainz Jr.	(Russia) Daniil Kvyat	(Finland) Koiranen Motorsport
4	R1	(Hungary) Hungaroring, Mogyoród	2 July	(Russia) Daniil Kvyat	(Russia) Daniil Kvyat	(Netherlands) Robin Frijns	(Germany) Josef Kaufmann Racing
4	R2	(Hungary) Hungaroring, Mogyoród	3 July	(Sweden) Timmy Hansen	(Sweden) Timmy Hansen	(Sweden) Timmy Hansen	(Austria) Interwetten.com Racing Junior Team
5	R1	(United Kingdom) Silverstone Circuit	20 August	(Spain) Carlos Sainz Jr.	(Spain) Carlos Sainz Jr.	(Netherlands) Robin Frijns	(Germany) Josef Kaufmann Racing
5	R2	(United Kingdom) Silverstone Circuit	21 August	(United Kingdom) Alex Lynn	(Finland) Miki Weckström	(Netherlands) Robin Frijns	(Germany) Josef Kaufmann Racing
6	R1	(France) Circuit Paul Ricard, Le Castellet	17 September	(France) Paul-Loup Chatin	(Spain) Alex Riberas	(France) Paul-Loup Chatin	(France) Tech 1 Racing
6	R2	(France) Circuit Paul Ricard, Le Castellet	18 September	(Spain) Carlos Sainz Jr.	(Russia) Daniil Kvyat	(Netherlands) Robin Frijns	(Germany) Josef Kaufmann Racing
7	R1	(Spain) Circuit de Catalunya, Montmeló	8 October	(Spain) Carlos Sainz Jr.	(Russia) Daniil Kvyat	(Spain) Javier Tarancón	(France) Tech 1 Racing
7	R2	(Spain) Circuit de Catalunya, Montmeló	9 October	(Spain) Alex Riberas	(Spain) Javier Tarancón	(Spain) Alex Riberas	(Spain) EPIC Racing

== Championship standings ==
- Points for both championships are awarded as follows:

1st	2nd	3rd	4th	5th	6th	7th	8th	9th	10th
25	18	15	12	10	8	6	4	2	1

=== Drivers' Championship ===
Pos	Driver	ARA (Spain)		SPA (Belgium)		NÜR (Germany)		HUN (Hungary)		SIL (United Kingdom)		LEC (France)		CAT (Spain)		Points
Pos	Driver	1	2	3	4	5	6	7	8	9	10	11	12	13	14	Points
1	(Netherlands) Robin Frijns	2	3	**3**	5	1	5	1	2	1	1	4	1	4	5	245
2	(Spain) Carlos Sainz Jr. **J**	1	2	1	**3**	2	2	8	14	**27**	6	3	**2**	**2**	2	200
3	(Russia) Daniil Kvyat **J**	Ret	5	4	1	7	**1**	**3**	11	8	5	2	3	3	Ret	155
4	(United Kingdom) Will Stevens	**Ret**	**1**	2	2	**4**	10	10	13	3	8	5	12	7	7	116
5	(Belgium) Stoffel Vandoorne	Ret	Ret	15	Ret	20	7	4	3	4	4	6	5	5	6	93
6	(Spain) Alex Riberas **J**	3	Ret	8	8	16	8	Ret	4	2	31	31	30	30	**1**	82
7	(Sweden) Timmy Hansen	Ret	4	36	16	6	3	7	**1**	6	11	8	DSQ	17	8	82
8	(Spain) Javier Tarancón	Ret	6	10	7	9	Ret	5	5	14	Ret	10	9	1	4	78
9	(France) Paul-Loup Chatin	Ret	9	11	9	8	9	29	6	5	3	**1**	8	13	9	75
10	(Colombia) Óscar Andrés Tunjo **J**	5	Ret	Ret	Ret	5	Ret	2	7	7	13	9	7	29	29	58
11	(France) Norman Nato	DSQ	8	Ret	Ret	3	Ret	13	8	Ret	9	7	4	Ret	3	58
12	(Puerto Rico) Félix Serrallés	7	Ret	7	6	18	6	30	9	15	7	32	10	8	15	41
13	(France) Yann Zimmer	15	13	6	4	32	16	14	12	Ret	14	18	14	6	14	28
14	(United Kingdom) Alex Lynn							6	20	Ret	**2**					26
15	(Sweden) John Bryant-Meisner **J**	6	24	34	14	23	Ret	21	21	29	18	20	6	16	13	16
16	(France) Mathieu Jaminet **J**	4	17	Ret	22	29	Ret	15	27	9	Ret	16	21	10	25	15
17	(Estonia) Karl-Oscar Liiv **J**	Ret	14	13	Ret	14	4	22	23	11	16	12	Ret	12	11	12
18	(Finland) Miki Weckström	18	11	5	35	22	21	Ret	10	12	12	15	13	Ret	16	11
19	(France) Côme Ledogar	17	7	Ret	10	11	Ret	9	22	18	21	13	18	Ret	12	9
20	(Brazil) Henrique Martins	9	10	16	12	Ret	11	12	29	Ret	19	11	17	9	Ret	5
21	(Netherlands) Liroy Stuart	8	15	17	30											4
22	(Sweden) Kevin Kleveros	10	Ret	12	11	13	Ret	Ret	18			14	19	19	18	1
23	(Italy) Vittorio Ghirelli **J**	12	16	Ret	20	12	Ret	17	16	17	10	30	31	15	21	1
24	(Netherlands) Pieter Schothorst	Ret	12	Ret	24	10	14	16	17	Ret	23	22	15	20	20	1
25	(United Kingdom) Melville McKee **J**					30	Ret			10	15	24	22			1
26	(Estonia) Hans Villemi **J**			26	25	19	17			26	Ret	21	20	Ret	10	1
27	(Estonia) Johannes Moor	Ret	Ret	Ret	26	17	12	11	15	28	17	19	Ret	14	17	0
28	(Thailand) Sandy Stuvik **J**	11	18	25	13	26	Ret	20	Ret	19	22	23	Ret	24	26	0
29	(Italy) Edolo Ghirelli	13	19	Ret	23	Ret	19	24	25	30	Ret	Ret	11	Ret	23	0
30	(United Kingdom) Mitchell Gilbert							19	24	13	24			11	19	0
31	(Switzerland) Christof von Grünigen					21	13									0
32	(Finland) Joni Wiman **J**	Ret	Ret	14	Ret	15	Ret	Ret	Ret							0
33	(Denmark) Dear Schilling **J**	14	23													0
34	(Austria) Thomas Jäger **J**	16	Ret	19	15	24	Ret	18	19							0
35	(Russia) Roman Mavlanov **J**	20	21	DNS	Ret	25	15	28	Ret	Ret	26	Ret	23	21	33	0
36	(Netherlands) Dennis van de Laar			18	18					16	Ret					0
37	(United States) Gustavo Menezes **J**			32	19			27	Ret	22	20			18	22	0
38	(Slovakia) Richard Gonda **J**	19	Ret	29	31	28	18	25	26	25	28	29	28	28	30	0
39	(Netherlands) Meindert van Buuren **J**			20	Ret					21	27	25	26	25	32	0
40	(Sweden) Ronnie Lundströmer **J**					27	20	23	Ret	23	Ret					0
41	(France) Grégoire Demoustier	Ret	20	31	DNS											0
42	(Russia) Denis Nagulin	21	22	28	Ret	31	Ret	26	28	Ret	30	26	27	27	Ret	0
43	(Malaysia) Fahmi Ilyas			33	21											0
44	(France) Florian Le Roux	22	Ret	Ret	Ret			Ret	Ret	Ret	29	27	29	Ret	31	0
45	(Russia) Aleksey Chuklin			35	27					24	32			23	27	0
	(United Kingdom) Jack Hawksworth							DNS	DNS							0
	(Brazil) João Jardim	EX	EX													0
Guest drivers ineligible for points
	(Belgium) Alessio Picariello **J**			9	36											0
	(United Arab Emirates) Ed Jones									20	25	17	16	Ret	Ret	0
	(Poland) Jakub Śmiechowski			22	17											0
	(Netherlands) Frank Suntjens			21	28											0
	(Italy) Cristiano Marcellan													22	24	0
	(Germany) Sebastian von Gartzen **J**			23	29											0
	(Italy) Stefano Colombo											28	24			0
	(Israel) Rafael Danieli **J**			24	34											0
	(Italy) Kevin Gilardoni **J**											Ret	25			0
	(Italy) Giorgio Roda													26	28	0
	(Sweden) Victor Bouveng **J**			27	33											0
	(Finland) Harri Salminen			30	32											0
	(Denmark) Johan Jokinen													Ret	Ret	0
Pos	Driver	ARA (Spain)		SPA (Belgium)		NÜR (Germany)		HUN (Hungary)		SIL (United Kingdom)		LEC (France)		CAT (Spain)		Points

Colour	Result
Gold	Winner
Silver	Second place
Bronze	Third place
Green	Points classification
Blue	Non-points classification
Blue	Non-classified finish (NC)
Purple	Retired, not classified (Ret)
Red	Did not qualify (DNQ)
Red	Did not pre-qualify (DNPQ)
Black	Disqualified (DSQ)
White	Did not start (DNS)
White	Withdrew (WD)
White	Race cancelled (C)
Blank	Did not practice (DNP)
Blank	Did not arrive (DNA)
Blank	Excluded (EX)

**Bold** – Pole
Italics – Fastest Lap

=== Teams' Championship ===
Pos	Team	ARA (Spain)		SPA (Belgium)		NÜR (Germany)		HUN (Hungary)		SIL (United Kingdom)		LEC (France)		CAT (Spain)		Points
1	(Finland) Koiranen Motorsport	1	2	1	1	2	1	3	11	8	5	2	2	2	2	355
1	(Finland) Koiranen Motorsport	Ret	5	4	3	7	2	8	14	26	6	3	3	3	13	355
2	(Germany) Josef Kaufmann Racing	2	3	3	5	1	5	1	2	1	1	4	1	4	5	303
2	(Germany) Josef Kaufmann Racing	5	17	Ret	22	5	Ret	2	7	7	13	9	7	29	25	303
3	(United Kingdom) Fortec Motorsport	7	1	2	2	4	6	6	13	3	2	5	10	7	7	175
3	(United Kingdom) Fortec Motorsport	Ret	Ret	7	6	18	10	10	20	13	8	17	12	8	15	175
4	(France) Tech 1 Racing	18	6	5	7	9	21	5	5	5	3	1	8	1	4	152
4	(France) Tech 1 Racing	Ret	11	10	35	22	Ret	29	6	12	12	10	9	Ret	9	152
5	(Belgium) KTR	8	15	15	30	20	7	4	3	4	4	6	5	5	6	97
5	(Belgium) KTR	Ret	Ret	17	Ret			DNS	DNS	21	27	25	26	25	32	97
6	(Spain) EPIC Racing	3	Ret	8	8	16	8	18	4	2	29	27	24	30	1	82
6	(Spain) EPIC Racing	22	Ret	Ret	Ret	24	Ret	Ret	19	Ret	31	28	29	Ret	31	82
7	(Austria) Interwetten.com Racing Junior Team	16	4	19	15	6	3	7	1	6	11	8	Ret	17	8	82
7	(Austria) Interwetten.com Racing Junior Team	Ret	Ret	36	16	21	13	27	Ret	19	20	23	DSQ	18	22	82
8	(France) R-ace GP	17	7	Ret	10	3	14	9	8	18	9	7	4	20	3	67
8	(France) R-ace GP	Ret	8	Ret	24	11	Ret	13	22	Ret	21	13	15	Ret	12	67
9	(France) ARTA Engineering	15	13	6	4	31	16	14	12	10	14	18	14	6	14	29
9	(France) ARTA Engineering					32	Ret			Ret	15	24	22			29
10	(Netherlands) MP Motorsport	10	14	12	11	13	4	22	15	11	16	12	19	12	11	13
10	(Netherlands) MP Motorsport	Ret	Ret	13	26	14	12	Ret	18	24	17	14	Ret	14	17	13
11	(Italy) Cram Competition	9	10	16	12	31	11	12	28	Ret	19	11	17	9	28	5
11	(Italy) Cram Competition	21	22	28	Ret	Ret	Ret	26	29	Ret	30	26	27	26	Ret	5
12	(Italy) ONE Racing	12	16	Ret	20	12	19	17	16	17	10	30	11	15	21	1
12	(Italy) ONE Racing	13	19	Ret	23	Ret	Ret	24	25	30	Ret	Ret	31	Ret	23	1
13	(Denmark) KEO Racing	11	18	25	13	26	20	20	Ret	23	Ret			Ret	Ret	0
13	(Denmark) KEO Racing	14	23			27	Ret	23	Ret							0
14	(France) Boetti Racing Team	20	21	DNS	Ret	25	15	28	Ret	Ret	26	Ret	23	21	33	0
15	(Netherlands) Van Amersfoort Racing			18	18					16	Ret					0
15	(Netherlands) Van Amersfoort Racing			20	Ret											0
16	(Czech Republic) Krenek Motorsport	19	Ret	29	31	28	18	25	26	25	28	29	28	28	30	0
17	(Italy) Torino Motorsport											Ret	26			0
Guest teams ineligible for points
	(Germany) SL Formula Racing			9	36											0
	(Germany) SL Formula Racing			23	29											0
	(Poland) Inter Europol Competition			22	17											0
	(Belgium) Speedlover			21	28											0
	(Belgium) Speedlover			24	34											0
	(Finland) Koiranen Junior			26	25											0
	(Sweden) Trackstar			27	33											0
	(Finland) P1 Motorsport			30	32											0
Pos	Team	ARA (Spain)		SPA (Belgium)		NÜR (Germany)		HUN (Hungary)		SIL (United Kingdom)		LEC (France)		CAT (Spain)		Points

Colour	Result
Gold	Winner
Silver	Second place
Bronze	Third place
Green	Points classification
Blue	Non-points classification
Blue	Non-classified finish (NC)
Purple	Retired, not classified (Ret)
Red	Did not qualify (DNQ)
Red	Did not pre-qualify (DNPQ)
Black	Disqualified (DSQ)
White	Did not start (DNS)
White	Withdrew (WD)
White	Race cancelled (C)
Blank	Did not practice (DNP)
Blank	Did not arrive (DNA)
Blank	Excluded (EX)
