= Thomas Jager =

Thomas Jager or Thomas Jäger may refer to:

- Thomas Jäger (Austrian racing driver), Austrian racing driver
- Thomas Jäger, German racing driver
- Thomas Jäger, former bassist of Swedish band Draconian
- Tom Jager, American former swimmer
