= Óscar Tunjo =

Colombian racing driver (born 1996)

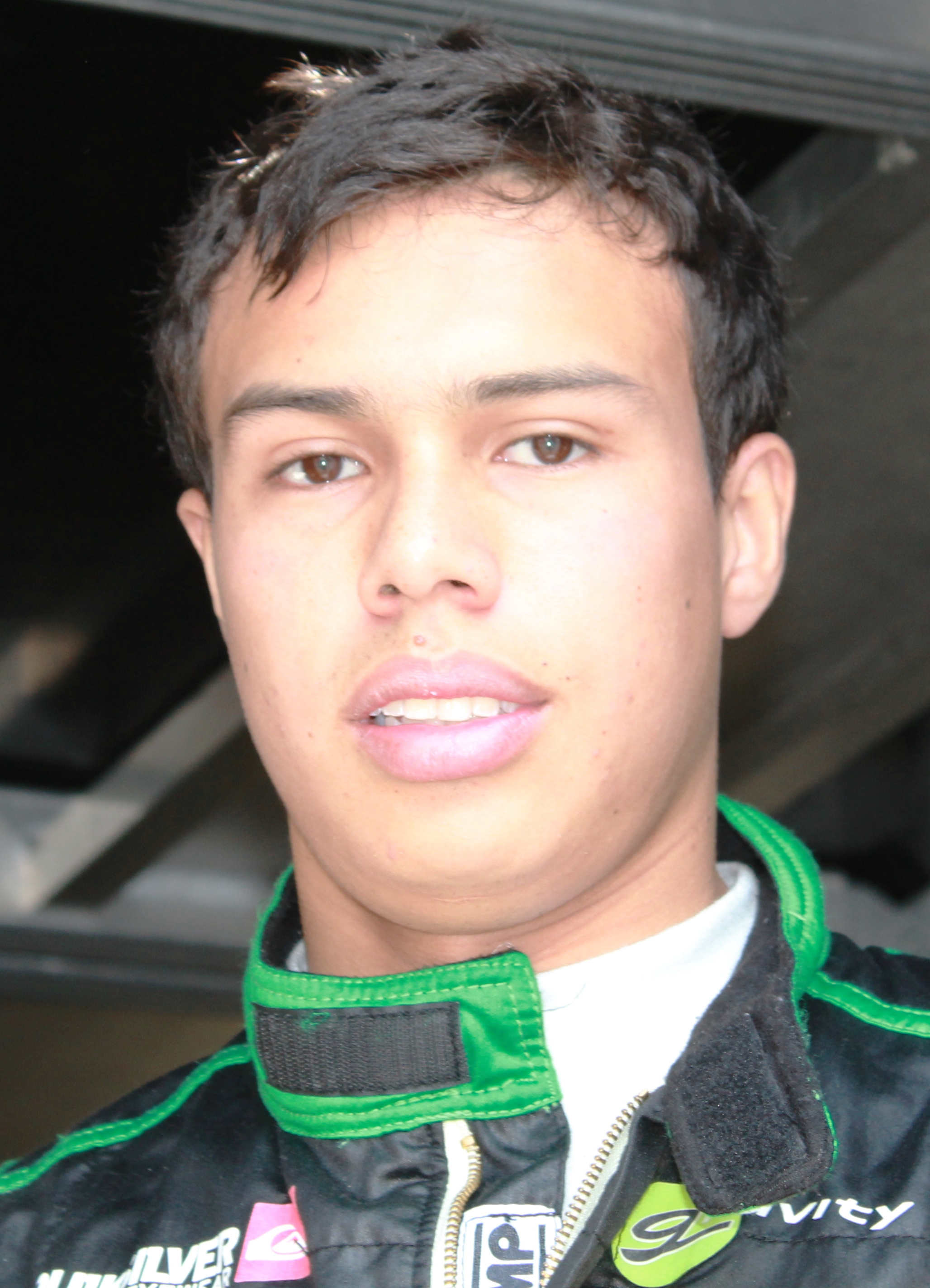
- Tunjo in 2012.
- Nationality: (Colombia) Colombian
- Born: Óscar Andrés Tunjo; 5 January 1996 (age 30) Cali, Colombia

GP3 Series career
- Debut season: 2015
- Current team: Jenzer Motorsport
- Categorisation: FIA Silver
- Car number: 20
- Former teams: Trident
- Starts: 11
- Wins: 1
- Poles: 0
- Fastest laps: 1
- Best finish: 15th in 2015

Previous series
- 2014 2011–13 2011, 13 2012 2010: Formula Renault 3.5 Series; Eurocup Formula Renault 2.0; Formula Renault 2.0 NEC; Formula Renault 2.0 Alps; Formula BMW Pacific

Óscar Andrés Tunjo (born 5 January 1996) is a Colombian racing driver.

== Career ==
=== Karting ===
Born in Cali, Tunjo began his racing career in karting at the age of five in Colombian championships, collecting titles in various classes. In 2007 he moved to Europe, and competed in local karting series.

=== Formula BMW ===
Tunjo made his début in single-seaters in 2010 at the age of fourteen, taking part in the Formula BMW Pacific series for Meritus. He finished the season as runner-up to Richard Bradley with one win at the Singapore Grand Prix-support round, while also scoring another four podiums.

=== Formula Renault ===
Tunjo returned to Europe in 2011, competing for Josef Kaufmann Racing in both the Eurocup Formula Renault 2.0 and the Formula Renault 2.0 NEC, the latter on a part-time basis. He closed out the top-ten in the Eurocup driver standings – including a podium at the Hungaroring – while in the NEC he had one podium at the Nürburgring.

Tunjo switched to Tech 1 Racing in 2012, competing in both the Formula Renault 2.0 Alps and the Eurocup Formula Renault series. He finished fourth in the Alps series with two wins, and seventh in the Eurocup with a win at Barcelona.

Tunjo returned to Josef Kaufmann Racing for the 2013 season, competing in the Formula Renault 2.0 NEC and the Eurocup Formula Renault series. He improved to sixth place in the Eurocup standings and had a win at Spa in the NEC series.

=== Formula Renault 3.5 Series ===
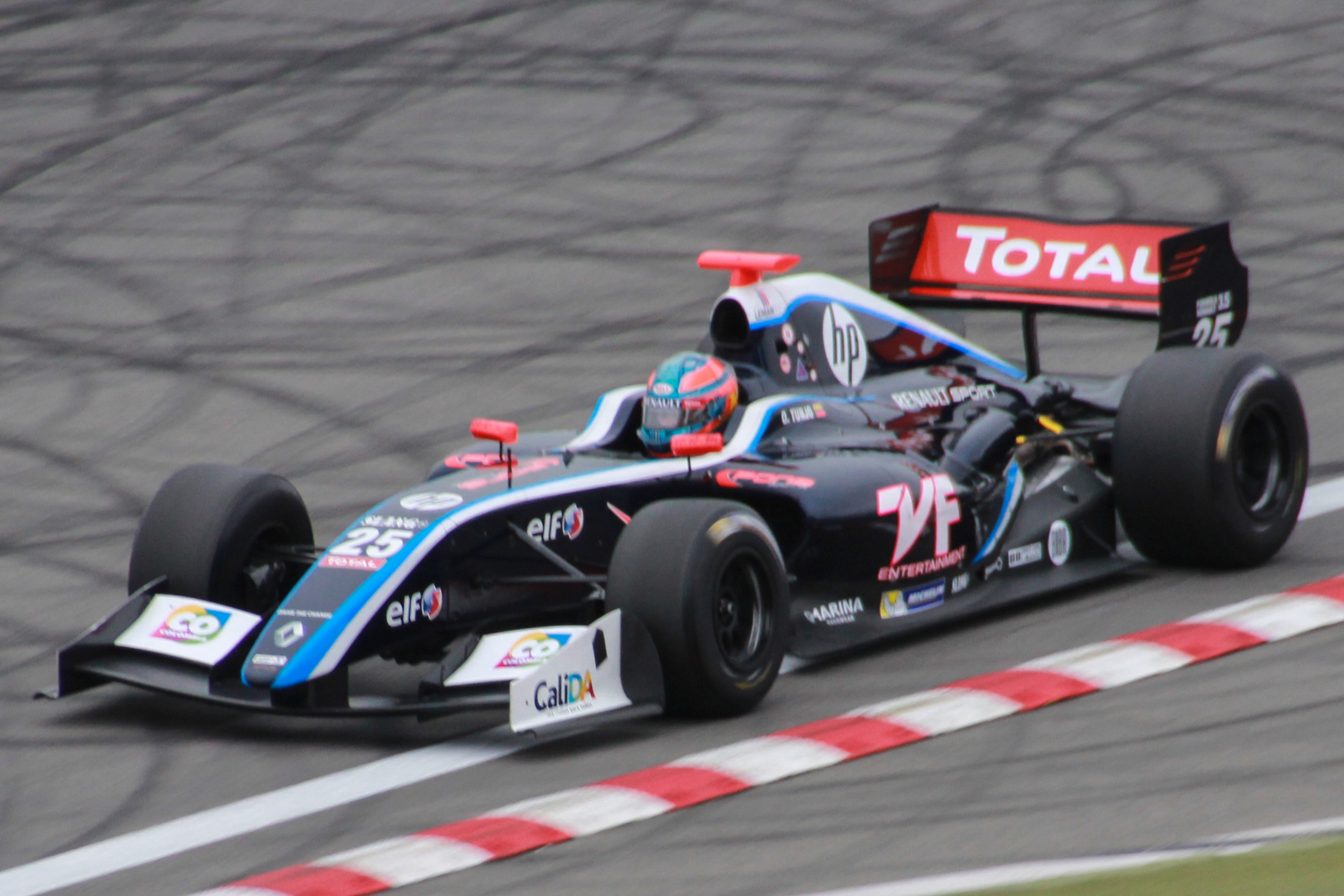
Tunjo racing at the Nürburgring round of the 2014 Formula Renault 3.5 Series season

Tunjo scheduled to make his Formula Three debut in the FIA European Formula Three Championship in 2014, racing for Signature. But when Signature withdrew from the championship he signed a contract with Pons Racing to compete in Formula Renault 3.5 Series in both 2014 and 2015.

== Racing record ==
=== Career summary ===
Season	Series	Team	Races	Wins	Poles	FLaps	Podiums	Points	Position
2010	Formula BMW Pacific	Meritus	15	1	2	3	5	141	**2nd**
2011	Eurocup Formula Renault 2.0	Josef Kaufmann Racing	14	0	0	0	1	58	10th
2011	Formula Renault 2.0 NEC	Josef Kaufmann Racing	7	0	0	0	1	63	23rd
2012	Eurocup Formula Renault 2.0	Tech 1 Racing	14	1	2	0	2	73	7th
2012	Formula Renault 2.0 Alps	Tech 1 Racing	10	2	1	2	2	97	4th
2013	Eurocup Formula Renault 2.0	Josef Kaufmann Racing	14	0	0	0	2	99	6th
2013	Formula Renault 2.0 NEC	Josef Kaufmann Racing	7	1	3	1	3	118	13th
2014	Formula Renault 3.5 Series	Pons Racing	12	0	0	0	0	11	22nd
2015	GP3 Series	Trident	6	1	0	0	1	17	15th
2016	GP3 Series	Jenzer Motorsport	5	0	0	1	1	18	16th
2017	Special Tourenwagen Trophy	Kornely Motorsport	10	7	4	7	9	186	**1st**
2018	ADAC GT Masters	Phoenix Racing	14	0	0	0	0	9	33rd
2018	GT4 Central European Cup - Pro-Am	Phoenix Racing	2	1	1	0	2	43	12th
2019	Blancpain GT World Challenge Europe	Belgian Audi Club Team WRT	10	0	0	0	0	6.5	19th
2019	Blancpain GT World Challenge Europe - Silver	Belgian Audi Club Team WRT	10	1	1	0	5	75	5th
2020	GT World Challenge Europe Sprint Cup	Toksport WRT	7	0	0	0	0	14	18th
2020	GT World Challenge Europe Sprint Cup - Silver Cup	Toksport WRT	7	1	1	0	5	69	4th
2021	GT World Challenge Europe Sprint Cup	Toksport WRT	10	0	0	0	0	25	10th
2021	GT World Challenge Europe Sprint Cup - Silver Cup	Toksport WRT	10	1	2	0	6	80	4th
2021	GT World Challenge Europe Endurance Cup	Toksport WRT	5	0	0	0	0	1	32nd
2021	GT World Challenge Europe Endurance Cup - Silver Cup	Toksport WRT	5	0	1	0	3	58	6th
2021	Intercontinental GT Challenge	Toksport WRT	1	0	0	0	0	2	20th
2022	European Le Mans Series - LMGTE	Rinaldi Racing	2	0	0	0	0	8	21st
2022	Prototype Cup Germany	Rinaldi Racing	6	0	0	0	2	63.5	7th
2022	GT World Challenge Europe Endurance Cup	Madpanda Motorsport	1	0	0	0	0	0	NC
2022	IMSA Prototype Challenge	Mühlner Motorsports America	1	0	0	0	0	240	31st
2023	European Le Mans Series - LMP3	WTM by Rinaldi Racing	6	1	1	0	3	66	**3rd**
2023	Prototype Cup Germany	JvO Racing by Downforce Motorsports	2	1	1	1	2	173	**2nd**
2023	Prototype Cup Germany	Van Ommen Racing by DataLab	10	2	1	2	5	173	**2nd**
2024	European Le Mans Series - LMP3	WTM by Rinaldi Racing	6	0	0	1	0	38	10th
2025	IMSA VP Racing SportsCar Challenge - LMP3	Gebhardt Motorsport	7	2	4	3	4	2110	4th
2025	Le Mans Cup - LMP3	Gebhardt Motorsport	7	0	0	0	1	22	11th
2025	Prototype Cup Germany	Gebhardt Motorsport	6	0	1	3	1	100	8th
2025	Prototype Cup Germany	Badischer Motorsport Club	2	1	0	0	2	100	8th
2026	IMSA VP Racing SportsCar Challenge - LMP3	Gebhardt Motorsport	14	6	7	2	13	4490	**1st**
2026	Prototype Cup Europe	German Motor Sports Team	4	0	0	0	0	35	12th
2026–27	Asian Le Mans Cup – LMP3 Pro	GMS							

=== Complete Formula Renault 2.0 NEC results ===
(key) (Races in bold indicate pole position) (Races in italics indicate fastest lap)

Year	Entrant	1	2	3	4	5	6	7	8	9	10	11	12	13	14	15	16	17	18	19	20	DC	Points
2011	Josef Kaufmann Racing	HOC; 1 Ret	HOC; 2; 5	HOC; 3; 10	SPA; 1 Ret	SPA; 2 Ret	NÜR; 1; 3	NÜR; 2; 5	ASS; 1	ASS; 2	ASS; 3	OSC; 1	OSC; 2	ZAN; 1	ZAN; 2	MST; 1	MST; 2	MST; 3	MNZ; 1	MNZ; 2	MNZ; 3	23rd	63
2013	Josef Kaufmann Racing	HOC; 1	HOC; 2	HOC; 3	**NÜR**; **1**; 3	NÜR; 2; 10	SIL; 1	SIL; 2	**SPA**; **1**; 1	**SPA**; **2** Ret	ASS; 1	ASS; 2	MST; 1; 2	MST; 2; 5	MST; 3; 4	ZAN; 1	ZAN; 2	ZAN; 3				13th	118

=== Complete Eurocup Formula Renault 2.0 results ===
(key) (Races in bold indicate pole position; races in italics indicate fastest lap)

Year	Entrant	1	2	3	4	5	6	7	8	9	10	11	12	13	14	DC	Points
2011	Josef Kaufmann Racing	ALC; 1; 5	ALC; 2 Ret	SPA; 1 Ret	SPA; 2 Ret	NÜR; 1; 5	NÜR; 2 Ret	HUN; 1; 2	HUN; 2; 7	SIL; 1; 7	SIL; 2; 13	LEC; 1; 9	LEC; 2; 7	CAT; 1; 29	CAT; 2; 29	10th	58
2012	Tech 1 Racing	ALC; 1 Ret	**ALC**; **2**; 2	SPA; 1; 12	SPA; 2 Ret	NÜR; 1; 22	NÜR; 2; 21	MSC; 1; 11	MSC; 2; 11	HUN; 1; 7	HUN; 2; 7	LEC; 1; 4	LEC; 2; 18	**CAT**; **1**; 1	CAT; 2; 7	7th	73
2013	Josef Kaufmann Racing	ALC; 1; 8	ALC; 2; 4	SPA; 1; 3	SPA; 2; 6	MSC; 1; 18	MSC; 2; 4	RBR; 1; 8	RBR; 2; 6	HUN; 1; 7	HUN; 2; 2	LEC; 1 Ret	LEC; 2; 10	CAT; 1; 8	CAT; 2; 8	6th	99

=== Complete Formula Renault 2.0 Alps Series results ===
(key) (Races in bold indicate pole position; races in italics indicate fastest lap)

Year	Team	1	2	3	4	5	6	7	8	9	10	11	12	13	14	Pos	Points
2012	Tech 1 Racing	MNZ; 1; 4	MNZ; 2 Ret	PAU; 1	PAU; 2	IMO; 1; 5	IMO; 2; 13	SPA; 1; 4	**SPA**; **2**; 1	RBR; 1; 12	RBR; 2 Ret	MUG; 1	MUG; 2	CAT; 1; 5	CAT; 2; 1	4th	97

=== Complete Formula Renault 3.5 Series results ===
(key) (Races in bold indicate pole position) (Races in italics indicate fastest lap)

Year	Team	1	2	3	4	5	6	7	8	9	10	11	12	13	14	15	16	17	Pos	Points
2014	Pons Racing	MNZ; 1	MNZ; 2	ALC; 1	ALC; 2	MON; 1	SPA; 1 Ret	SPA; 2; 15	MSC; 1; 10	MSC; 2; 17	NÜR; 1; 8	NÜR; 2 Ret	HUN; 1; 12	HUN; 2 Ret	LEC; 1; 18	LEC; 2; 15	JER; 1 Ret	JER; 2; 7	22nd	11

=== Complete GP3 Series results ===
(key) (Races in bold indicate pole position) (Races in italics indicate fastest lap)

Year	Entrant	1	2	3	4	5	6	7	8	9	10	11	12	13	14	15	16	17	18	Pos	Points
2015	Trident	CAT; FEA; 16	CAT; SPR; 11	RBR; FEA; 9	RBR; SPR; 1	SIL; FEA; 11	SIL; SPR; 10	HUN; FEA	HUN; SPR	SPA; FEA	SPA; SPR	MNZ; FEA	MNZ; SPR	SOC; FEA	SOC; SPR	BHR; FEA	BHR; SPR	YMC; FEA	YMC; SPR	15th	17
2016	Jenzer Motorsport	CAT; FEA; 8	CAT; SPR; 2	RBR; FEA; 14	RBR; SPR; 13	SIL; FEA	SIL; SPR	HUN; FEA	HUN; SPR	HOC; FEA	HOC; SPR	SPA; FEA; 15	SPA; SPR; DNS	MNZ; FEA	MNZ; SPR	SEP; FEA	SEP; SPR	YMC; FEA	YMC; SPR	16th	18

=== Complete ADAC GT Masters results ===
(key) (Races in bold indicate pole position) (Races in italics indicate fastest lap)

Year	Team	Car	1	2	3	4	5	6	7	8	9	10	11	12	13	14	DC	Points
2018	Phoenix Racing	Audi R8 LMS Evo	OSC; 1; 10	OSC; 2; 29	MST; 1 Ret	MST; 2; 19	RBR; 1; 11	RBR; 2 Ret	NÜR; 1; 7	NÜR; 2; 30	ZAN; 1; 11	ZAN; 2; 15	SAC; 1; 13	SAC; 2; 9	HOC; 1; 21	HOC; 2; 15	33rd	9

=== Complete GT World Challenge Europe Sprint Cup results ===
Year	Team	Car	Class	1	2	3	4	5	6	7	8	9	10	Pos.	Points
2019	Belgian Audi Club Team WRT	Audi R8 LMS	Silver	BRH; 1; 9	BRH; 2 Ret	MIS; 1; 25	MIS; 2; 9	ZAN; 1; 11	ZAN; 2; 25	NÜR; 1; 11	**NÜR**; **2**; 6	HUN; 1; 16	HUN; 2; 14	5th	75
2020	Toksport WRT	Mercedes-AMG GT3 Evo	Silver	MIS; 1 WD	MIS; 2 WD	MIS; 3 WD	MAG; 1; 8	MAG; 2; 8	ZAN; 1; 13	ZAN; 2; 5	CAT; 1; 9	**CAT**; **2**; 7	CAT; 3 Ret	4th	69
2021	Toksport WRT	Mercedes-AMG GT3 Evo	Silver	MAG; 1; 7	MAG; 2; 23	ZAN; 1; 5	ZAN; 2; 10	MIS; 1; 10	MIS; 2; 9	BRH; 1; 6	**BRH**; **2**; 4	**VAL**; **1** Ret	VAL; 2; 8	4th	80

=== Complete European Le Mans Series results ===
(key) (Races in bold indicate pole position; results in italics indicate fastest lap)

Year	Entrant	Class	Chassis	Engine	1	2	3	4	5	6	Rank	Points
2022	Rinaldi Racing	LMGTE	Ferrari 488 GTE Evo	Ferrari F154CB 3.9 L Turbo V8	LEC; 11	IMO; 6	MNZ	CAT	SPA	ALG	21st	8
2023	WTM by Rinaldi Racing	LMP3	Duqueine M30 - D08	Nissan VK56DE 5.6 L V8	CAT; Ret	**LEC**; 2	ARA; 2	SPA; EX	ALG; 1	ALG; 8	3rd	66
2024	WTM by Rinaldi Racing	LMP3	Duqueine M30 - D08	Nissan VK56DE 5.6L V8	CAT; 8	LEC; Ret	IMO; 5	SPA; 8	MUG; 6	ALG; 4	10th	38

=== Complete Le Mans Cup results ===
(key) (Races in bold indicate pole position; results in italics indicate fastest lap)

Year	Entrant	Class	Chassis	1	2	3	4	5	6	7	Rank	Points
2025	Gebhardt Motorsport	LMP3	Duqueine D09	CAT; Ret	LEC; Ret	LMS; 1; 10	LMS; 2; 3	SPA; Ret	SIL; 10	ALG; 4	11th	22

^{*} Season still in progress.
