= 2012 Formula Renault 2.0 Alps Series =

Motor racing competition

Seasons
- ← 2011 2013 →

The 2012 Formula Renault 2.0 Alps Series is the second year of the Formula Renault 2.0 Alps series, and the eleventh season of the former Swiss Formula Renault Championship. The championship began on 24 March at Monza and will finish on 21 October at Barcelona after fourteen races held at seven meetings.

The second-year drivers shined in the opening weekend at Monza. The first pole position of the season was claimed by Tech 1's Paul-Loup Chatin, but in the first race he was passed by Red Bull-backed Koiranen's Daniil Kvyat and 2011 Junior champion Melville McKee. Kvyat, who set the second fastest time in qualifying, dominated in both races and left Monza with 53 of 54 possible points.

== Drivers and teams ==
Team	No.	Driver name	Rounds
(Finland) Koiranen Motorsport	1	(Finland) Patrick Kujala	All
(Finland) Koiranen Motorsport	2	(France) Esteban Ocon	1, 3–7
(Finland) Koiranen Motorsport	3	(Russia) Daniil Kvyat	All
(Finland) Koiranen Motorsport	4	(Germany) Stefan Wackerbauer	All
(Finland) Koiranen Motorsport	5	(Estonia) Hans Villemi	1, 5–7
(Finland) Koiranen Motorsport	6	(Brazil) Gustavo Lima	All
(Finland) Koiranen Motorsport	7	(Brazil) Victor Franzoni	1–3, 5–7
(Finland) Koiranen Motorsport	51	(Saudi Arabia) Saud Al Faisal	4
(Italy) GSK Grand Prix	8	(Italy) Nicola De Val	All
(Italy) GSK Grand Prix	9	(Italy) Stefano De Val	All
(France) ARTA Engineering	10	(Andorra) Alex Loan	All
(France) ARTA Engineering	29	(France) William Vermont	All
(France) ARTA Engineering	30	(France) Léo Roussel	All
(France) ARTA Engineering	31	(France) Paul Petit	2
(France) ARTA Engineering	54	(France) Tristan Papavoine	All
(Luxembourg) RC Formula	11	(France) Aurélien Panis	1–3, 5–7
(Luxembourg) RC Formula	36	(France) Norman Nato	All
(Luxembourg) RC Formula	39	(Italy) Edolo Ghirelli	2–3
(Luxembourg) RC Formula	49	(Belgium) Benjamin Bailly	4
(France) Tech 1 Racing	12	(France) Matthieu Vaxivière	1–3, 7
(France) Tech 1 Racing	14	(Colombia) Óscar Tunjo	1, 3–7
(France) Tech 1 Racing	15	(Russia) Roman Mavlanov	All
(France) Tech 1 Racing	80	(Brazil) Felipe Fraga	All
(France) Tech 1 Racing	111	(France) Paul-Loup Chatin	All
(Italy) BVM Racing	19	(Switzerland) Michael Heche	6–7
(Spain) EPIC Racing	20	(United Kingdom) Alexander Albon	All
(Italy) Prema Powerteam	21	(Italy) Luca Ghiotto	6–7
(Italy) Prema Powerteam	22	(Brazil) Bruno Bonifacio	6–7
(Austria) Interwetten.com Racing Team	23	(Russia) Konstantin Tereshchenko	All
(Austria) Interwetten.com Racing Team	24	(United Kingdom) Melville McKee	1–2, 5
(Austria) Interwetten.com Racing Team	25	(Brazil) Guilherme Silva	All
(Italy) Cram Competition	27	(Italy) Giorgio Roda	7
(Italy) One Racing	28	(Austria) Thomas Jäger	1–2
(Italy) One Racing	32	(Poland) Alex Bosak	All
(Spain) AV Formula	35	(San Marino) Emanuele Zonzini	6–7
(Spain) AV Formula	37	(Colombia) Tatiana Calderón	6–7
(Spain) AV Formula	40	(Russia) Egor Orudzhev	6
(Spain) AV Formula	41	(Russia) Denis Nagulin	7
(United Kingdom) Atech Reid GP	38	(United Kingdom) Alessandro Latif	1, 4
(United Kingdom) Atech Reid GP	39	(Italy) Edolo Ghirelli	1
(United Kingdom) Fortec Motorsports	57	(United Kingdom) Dan de Zille	7
(United Kingdom) Mark Burdett Motorsport	60	(Brazil) Gabriel Casagrande	3–4, 6–7
(Italy) Brixia Horse Power by Facondini Racing	73	(Italy) Andrea Baiguera	1–4, 6–7
(Italy) Team Torino Motorsport	81	(Mexico) Alejandro Abogado	All
(Italy) Team Torino Motorsport	82	(Mexico) Luis Michael Dörrbecker	1–4
(Italy) Team Torino Motorsport	83	(Italy) Simone Iaquinta	1–4, 6
(Italy) Team Torino Motorsport	85	(Russia) Alexey Chuklin	7

== Race calendar and results ==
The seven-event calendar for the 2012 season was announced on 22 November 2011. The series supported Italian Renault Clio Cup events at all Italian circuits in the schedule and on the Red Bull Ring with Pau Grand Prix, FIA Formula Two Championship round at Spa and World Series by Renault round at Barcelona.

Round		Circuit	Date	Pole position	Fastest lap	Winning driver	Winning team	Junior Winner
1	R1	(Italy) Autodromo Nazionale Monza	24 March	(France) Paul-Loup Chatin	(Russia) Daniil Kvyat	(Russia) Daniil Kvyat	(Finland) Koiranen Motorsport	(Colombia) Óscar Tunjo
1	R2	(Italy) Autodromo Nazionale Monza	25 March	(Russia) Daniil Kvyat	(Russia) Daniil Kvyat	(Russia) Daniil Kvyat	(Finland) Koiranen Motorsport	(France) Esteban Ocon
2	R1	(France) Pau Circuit	12 May	(France) Norman Nato^{1}	(France) Norman Nato	(France) Norman Nato	(Luxembourg) RC Formula	(Brazil) Felipe Fraga
2	R2	(France) Pau Circuit	13 May	(France) Paul-Loup Chatin^{1}	(France) Norman Nato	(France) Paul-Loup Chatin	(France) Tech 1 Racing	(Finland) Patrick Kujala
3	R1	(Italy) Autodromo Enzo e Dino Ferrari, Imola	26 May	(France) Norman Nato	(France) Norman Nato	(France) Norman Nato	(Luxembourg) RC Formula	(Colombia) Óscar Tunjo
3	R2	(Italy) Autodromo Enzo e Dino Ferrari, Imola	27 May	(France) Norman Nato	(France) Norman Nato	(France) Norman Nato	(Luxembourg) RC Formula	(Germany) Stefan Wackerbauer
4	R1	(Belgium) Circuit de Spa-Francorchamps	23 June	(France) Norman Nato	(Brazil) Guilherme Silva	(Russia) Daniil Kvyat	(Finland) Koiranen Motorsport	(Colombia) Óscar Tunjo
4	R2	(Belgium) Circuit de Spa-Francorchamps	24 June	(Colombia) Óscar Tunjo	(Colombia) Óscar Tunjo	(Colombia) Óscar Tunjo	(France) Tech 1 Racing	(Colombia) Óscar Tunjo
5	R1	(Austria) Red Bull Ring, Spielberg	1 September	(Brazil) Victor Franzoni	(France) Esteban Ocon	(Russia) Daniil Kvyat	(Finland) Koiranen Motorsport	(France) Esteban Ocon
5	R2	(Austria) Red Bull Ring, Spielberg	2 September	(Brazil) Victor Franzoni	(Russia) Daniil Kvyat	(Russia) Daniil Kvyat	(Finland) Koiranen Motorsport	(France) Esteban Ocon
6	R1	(Italy) Mugello Circuit	6 October	(Russia) Daniil Kvyat	(Russia) Daniil Kvyat	(Russia) Daniil Kvyat	(Finland) Koiranen Motorsport	(Finland) Patrick Kujala
6	R2	(Italy) Mugello Circuit	7 October	(Russia) Daniil Kvyat	(France) Norman Nato	(Russia) Daniil Kvyat	(Finland) Koiranen Motorsport	(Finland) Patrick Kujala
7	R1	(Spain) Circuit de Catalunya, Barcelona	21 October	(France) Norman Nato	(France) Paul-Loup Chatin	(France) Norman Nato	(Luxembourg) RC Formula	(Estonia) Hans Villemi
7	R2	(Spain) Circuit de Catalunya, Barcelona	21 October	(Russia) Daniil Kvyat	(Colombia) Óscar Tunjo	(Colombia) Óscar Tunjo	(France) Tech 1 Racing	(Colombia) Óscar Tunjo

- ^{1} In the qualifying session at Pau, drivers were divided in two groups. Paul-Loup Chatin and Norman Nato both scored an additional point for the fastest time in each of the split qualifying groups.

== Championship standings ==
=== Drivers' Championship ===
Pos	Driver	MNZ (Italy)		PAU (France)		IMO (Italy)		SPA (Belgium)		RBR (Austria)		MUG (Italy)		CAT (Spain)		Points
1	(Russia) Daniil Kvyat	1	1	7	Ret	4	Ret	1	10	1	1	1	1	3	Ret	217
2	(France) Norman Nato	5	4	1	2	1	1	23	2	10	6	2	2	1	Ret	214
3	(France) Paul-Loup Chatin	3	2	2	1	3	Ret	2	3	14	12	3	3	2	2	194
4	(Colombia) Óscar Tunjo	4	Ret			5	13	4	1	12	Ret			5	1	97
5	(France) William Vermont	16	3	16	4	2	2	13	8	2	7	10	12	10	10	93
6	(Finland) Patrick Kujala	17	13	5	5	12	Ret	5	Ret	6	5	5	5	12	5	78
7	(France) Esteban Ocon	8	5			7	4	25	7	3	3			11	DNS	69
8	(Brazil) Guilherme Silva	7	6	Ret	7	13	7	3	5	9	10	8	Ret	Ret	Ret	59
9	(Brazil) Felipe Fraga	24	Ret	3	Ret	11	Ret	6	4	15	9	12	13	15	3	52
10	(United Kingdom) Melville McKee	2	Ret	6	13					8	2					48
11	(Brazil) Victor Franzoni	Ret	16	23	19	Ret	16			4	4	9	8	6	8	44
12	(Germany) Stefan Wackerbauer	15	25	8	24	Ret	3	9	6	7	14	7	14	Ret	20	41
13	(Italy) Simone Iaquinta	6	23	19	22	6	5	Ret	Ret			4	10			39
14	(France) Matthieu Vaxivière	Ret	12	4	3	Ret	14							18	9	29
15	(Russia) Roman Mavlanov	9	7	22	14	Ret	12	7	17	Ret	17	20	11	9	4	28
16	(United Kingdom) Alexander Albon	Ret	Ret	Ret	10	10	6	8	Ret	5	11	17	9	14	Ret	26
17	(France) Aurélien Panis	Ret	10	10	6	8	Ret			11	15	11	7	7	11	26
18	(Estonia) Hans Villemi	14	8							18	13	13	15	4	6	24
19	(Italy) Luca Ghiotto											6	6	13	7	22
20	(Brazil) Bruno Bonifacio											Ret	4	8	Ret	16
21	(France) Léo Roussel	12	11	9	8	9	22	10	22	Ret	8	23	25	Ret	DNS	13
22	(Andorra) Alex Loan	21	Ret	DNS	DNS	16	8	15	11	Ret	21	22	21	Ret	DNS	4
23	(Austria) Thomas Jäger	10	9	14	23											3
24	(France) Tristan Papavoine	Ret	Ret	11	9	Ret	11	11	21	13	16	Ret	18	Ret	DNS	2
25	(Mexico) Luis Michael Dörrbecker	11	19	13	11	21	9	14	16							2
26	(Brazil) Gabriel Casagrande					Ret	Ret	Ret	9			18	Ret	25	12	2
27	(Italy) Stefano De Val	18	14	Ret	DNS	15	10	12	12	21	Ret	15	27	19	23	1
28	(Italy) Edolo Ghirelli	13	15	12	20	14	Ret									0
29	(Brazil) Gustavo Lima	25	17	17	12	19	15	19	Ret	Ret	20	21	22	21	15	0
30	(San Marino) Emanuele Zonzini											19	17	26	13	0
31	(Belgium) Benjamin Bailly							17	13							0
32	(Russia) Konstantin Tereshchenko	22	21	Ret	16	17	18	16	14	Ret	18	Ret	19	16	DNS	0
33	(Colombia) Tatiana Calderón											16	20	20	14	0
34	(Switzerland) Michael Heche											14	Ret	17	21	0
35	(Italy) Andrea Baiguera	19	DSQ	18	15	Ret	20	20	15	17	19	Ret	Ret	28	17	0
36	(Italy) Nicola De Val	27	18	15	Ret	18	17	18	19	16	Ret	Ret	16	23	18	0
37	(Russia) Denis Nagulin													21	16	0
38	(France) Paul Petit			24	17											0
39	(Poland) Alex Bosak	26	22	21	18	20	19	Ret	20	19	Ret	25	23	29	24	0
40	(Saudi Arabia) Saud Al Faisal							22	18							0
41	(Mexico) Alejandro Abogado	23	20	20	21	Ret	21	21	Ret	20	22	24	24	27	Ret	0
42	(Italy) Giorgio Roda													24	19	0
43	(United Kingdom) Alessandro Latif	20	24					24	Ret							0
44	(Russia) Alexey Chuklin													Ret	22	0
45	(Russia) Egor Orudzhev											Ret	26			0
Pos	Driver	MNZ (Italy)		PAU (France)		IMO (Italy)		SPA (Belgium)		RBR (Austria)		MUG (Italy)		CAT (Spain)		Points

Colour	Result
Gold	Winner
Silver	Second place
Bronze	Third place
Green	Points classification
Blue	Non-points classification
Blue	Non-classified finish (NC)
Purple	Retired, not classified (Ret)
Red	Did not qualify (DNQ)
Red	Did not pre-qualify (DNPQ)
Black	Disqualified (DSQ)
White	Did not start (DNS)
White	Withdrew (WD)
White	Race cancelled (C)
Blank	Did not practice (DNP)
Blank	Did not arrive (DNA)
Blank	Excluded (EX)

=== Juniors' championship ===
Pos	Driver	MNZ (Italy)		PAU (France)		IMO (Italy)		SPA (Belgium)		RBR (Austria)		MUG (Italy)		CAT (Spain)		Points
1	(Finland) Patrick Kujala	17	13	5	5	12	Ret	5	Ret	6	5	5	5	12	5	191
2	(Colombia) Óscar Tunjo	4	Ret			5	13	4	1	12	Ret			5	1	161
3	(France) Esteban Ocon	8	5			7	4	25	7	3	3			11	DNS	154
4	(Brazil) Felipe Fraga	24	Ret	3	Ret	11	Ret	6	4	15	9	12	13	15	3	128
5	(Germany) Stefan Wackerbauer	15	25	8	24	Ret	3	9	6	7	14	7	14	Ret	20	126
6	(Brazil) Victor Franzoni	Ret	16	23	19	Ret	16			4	4	9	8	6	8	120
7	(France) Léo Roussel	12	11	9	8	9	22	10	22	Ret	8	23	25	Ret	DNS	106
8	(United Kingdom) Alexander Albon	Ret	Ret	Ret	10	10	6	8	Ret	5	11	17	9	14	Ret	101
9	(Estonia) Hans Villemi	14	8							18	13	13	15	4	6	91
10	(Brazil) Gustavo Lima	25	17	17	12	19	15	19	Ret	Ret	20	21	22	21	15	59
11	(Italy) Luca Ghiotto											6	6	13	7	54
12	(Andorra) Alex Loan	21	Ret	DNS	DNS	16	8	15	11	Ret	21	22	21	Ret	DNS	42
13	(Brazil) Gabriel Casagrande					Ret	Ret	Ret	9			18	Ret	25	12	21
14	(United Kingdom) Alessandro Latif	20	24					24	Ret							14
15	(Russia) Egor Orudzhev											Ret	26			0
Pos	Driver	MNZ (Italy)		PAU (France)		IMO (Italy)		SPA (Belgium)		RBR (Austria)		MUG (Italy)		CAT (Spain)		Points

=== Teams' championship ===
Prior to each round of the championship, two drivers from each team – if applicable – are nominated to score teams' championship points.

Pos	Team	Points
1	(France) Tech 1 Racing	318
2	(Finland) Koiranen Motorsport	312
3	(Luxembourg) RC Formula	240
4	(Austria) Interwetten.com Racing Team	107
5	(France) ARTA Engineering	107
6	(Italy) Team Torino Motorsport	41
7	(Italy) Prema Powerteam	38
8	(Spain) EPIC Racing	26
9	(Italy) One Racing	3
10	(United Kingdom) Mark Burdett Motorsport	2
11	(Italy) GSK Grand Prix	1
12	(United Kingdom) Atech Reid GP	0
13	(Italy) Brixia Horse Power by Facondini Racing	0
14	(Spain) AV Formula	0
15	(Italy) BVM Racing	0
