= 2010 Formula Lista Junior season =

2010 Formula Lista Junior

Seasons
- ← 2009 2011 →

The 2010 Formula Lista Junior season was the eleventh Formula Lista Junior season. It began on 17 April at the Hockenheimring and ended on 26 September at Monza after twelve races held at six meetings.

With top five finishes in each of the twelve races including five victories, Jo Zeller Racing's Michael Lamotte finished the season as champion by 29 points, to give his team their first Formula Lista title. Second place in the championship was taken by Daltec Racing's Yannick Mettler, who won two races – at the first and last meetings of the season – at Hockenheim and Monza, as well as taken six other podium placings. Seven podium finishes in the last eight races including victories at Most and the second Hockenheim meeting allowed Melville McKee of the Hope Pole Vision Racing team to finish the season in third position. Eric Neuber's CSR Motorsport car finished fourth in the championship, although winless Neuber was aided by ten top-five finishes, while Jimmy Antunes completed the top five, winning a race at Most. Christof von Grünigen was the only other winner during the season, sweeping the Nürburgring races in one of three appearances during the season. Daltec Racing's strength in numbers – running up to six cars at certain meetings – allowed them to pip Jo Zeller Racing, who ran only Lamotte during the season, to the Teams' Championship by seven points.

== Teams and drivers ==
- All cars were BMW-engined Mygale FB02 chassis.

Team	No	Driver	Rounds
(Italy) Torino Motorsport	10	(Switzerland) Mauro Calamia	All
(Switzerland) Felix Racing Team	22	(Switzerland) Maurizio Manna	All
(Switzerland) Felix Racing Team	23	(Switzerland) Robyn Lehmann	1
(Switzerland) Jo Zeller Racing	24	(United States) Michael Lamotte	All
(Switzerland) Daltec Racing	25	(Israel) Roy Nissany	All
(Switzerland) Daltec Racing	26	(Switzerland) Yannick Mettler	All
(Switzerland) Daltec Racing	27	(Switzerland) Jimmy Antunes	All
(Switzerland) Daltec Racing	28	(Italy) Nicolò Rocca	All
(Switzerland) Daltec Racing	29	(Switzerland) Christof von Grünigen	1–2, 6
(Switzerland) Daltec Racing	30	(Germany) Dennis Wüsthoff	All
(Switzerland) Daltec Racing	31	(Australia) Jesse Dixon	5
(Switzerland) ACS Schweiz	32	(Switzerland) Dominik Kocher	1–2, 4–6
(Germany) CSR Motorsport	33	(Germany) Eric Neuber	All
(Switzerland) Hope Pole Vision Racing	38	(United Kingdom) Melville McKee	All
(Switzerland) Hope Pole Vision Racing	39	(France) Hugo Bel	1–3
(Switzerland) Hope Pole Vision Racing	40	(Belgium) Benjamin Breny	6

== Race calendar and results ==
Round		Circuit	Date	Pole position	Fastest lap	Winning driver	Winning team
1	R1	(Germany) Hockenheimring	17 April	(United States) Michael Lamotte	(Germany) Eric Neuber	(United States) Michael Lamotte	(Switzerland) Jo Zeller Racing
1	R2	(Germany) Hockenheimring	18 April	(Switzerland) Yannick Mettler	(Switzerland) Robyn Lehmann	(Switzerland) Yannick Mettler	(Switzerland) Daltec Racing
2	R1	(Germany) Nürburgring	1 May	(Switzerland) Christof von Grünigen	(Switzerland) Christof von Grünigen	(Switzerland) Christof von Grünigen	(Switzerland) Daltec Racing
2	R2	(Germany) Nürburgring	2 May	(Switzerland) Christof von Grünigen	(Germany) Dennis Wüsthoff	(Switzerland) Christof von Grünigen	(Switzerland) Daltec Racing
3	R1	(Czech Republic) Autodrom Most	22 May	(Switzerland) Jimmy Antunes	(Switzerland) Jimmy Antunes	(Switzerland) Jimmy Antunes	(Switzerland) Daltec Racing
3	R2	(Czech Republic) Autodrom Most	23 May	(Switzerland) Jimmy Antunes	(Switzerland) Yannick Mettler	(United Kingdom) Melville McKee	(Switzerland) Hope Pole Vision Racing
4	R1	(Germany) Hockenheimring	19 June	(Switzerland) Yannick Mettler	(Switzerland) Yannick Mettler	(United Kingdom) Melville McKee	(Switzerland) Hope Pole Vision Racing
4	R2	(Germany) Hockenheimring	20 June	(Switzerland) Yannick Mettler	(United States) Michael Lamotte	(United States) Michael Lamotte	(Switzerland) Jo Zeller Racing
5	R1	(France) Circuit de Nevers Magny-Cours	7 August	(United States) Michael Lamotte	(United States) Michael Lamotte	(United States) Michael Lamotte	(Switzerland) Jo Zeller Racing
5	R2	(France) Circuit de Nevers Magny-Cours	8 August	(Switzerland) Yannick Mettler	(United States) Michael Lamotte	(United States) Michael Lamotte	(Switzerland) Jo Zeller Racing
6	R1	(Italy) Autodromo Nazionale Monza	25 September	(United States) Michael Lamotte	(United States) Michael Lamotte	(United States) Michael Lamotte	(Switzerland) Jo Zeller Racing
6	R2	(Italy) Autodromo Nazionale Monza	26 September	(Israel) Roy Nissany	(Germany) Eric Neuber	(Switzerland) Yannick Mettler	(Switzerland) Daltec Racing

== Championship standings ==
=== Drivers' championship ===
Position	1st	2nd	3rd	4th	5th	6th	7th	8th	9th	10th	Pole position	Fastest lap
Points	20	15	12	10	8	6	4	3	2	1	**2**	2

Pos	Driver	HOC (Germany)		NÜR (Germany)		MOS (Czech Republic)		HOC (Germany)		MAG (France)		MZA (Italy)		Pts
1	(United States) Michael Lamotte	**1**	3	2	3	4	5	4	1	**1**	1	**1**	4	191
2	(Switzerland) Yannick Mettler	2	**1**	3	2	9	2	**10**	**2**	2	**4**	4	1	162
3	(United Kingdom) Melville McKee	Ret	10	6	4	2	1	1	3	6	2	2	2	135
4	(Germany) Eric Neuber	4	4	10	5	Ret	4	3	4	3	5	5	5	101
5	(Switzerland) Jimmy Antunes	9	11	7	7	**1**	**6**	2	6	5	6	10	7	82
6	(Switzerland) Christof von Grünigen	Ret	2	**1**	**1**							6	3	79
7	(Germany) Dennis Wüsthoff	6	9	5	10	5	Ret	9	7	4	3	3	8	70
8	(Israel) Roy Nissany	8	5	4	6	8	Ret	7	9	9	8	Ret	**11**	43
9	(Italy) Nicolò Rocca	10	13	9	12	6	3	5	5	Ret	Ret	8	Ret	40
10	(Switzerland) Maurizio Manna	7	7	11	8	3	8	8	10	10	10	9	6	40
11	(Switzerland) Mauro Calamia	5	8	8	9	Ret	Ret	6	8	8	7	7	Ret	36
12	(Switzerland) Robyn Lehmann	3	6											20
13	(France) Hugo Bel	Ret	12	12	Ret	7	7							8
14	(Australia) Jesse Dixon									7	9			6
15	(Belgium) Benjamin Breny											12	9	2
16	(Switzerland) Dominik Kocher	11	Ret	Ret	11			Ret	11	11	Ret	11	10	1
Pos	Driver	HOC (Germany)		NÜR (Germany)		MOS (Czech Republic)		HOC (Germany)		MAG (France)		MZA (Italy)		Pts

Colour	Result
Gold	Winner
Silver	Second place
Bronze	Third place
Green	Points classification
Blue	Non-points classification
Blue	Non-classified finish (NC)
Purple	Retired, not classified (Ret)
Red	Did not qualify (DNQ)
Red	Did not pre-qualify (DNPQ)
Black	Disqualified (DSQ)
White	Did not start (DNS)
White	Withdrew (WD)
White	Race cancelled (C)
Blank	Did not practice (DNP)
Blank	Did not arrive (DNA)
Blank	Excluded (EX)

**Bold** – Pole
Italics – Fastest Lap

=== Teams' championship ===
Position	1st	2nd	3rd	4th	5th	6th	7th	8th
Points	10	8	6	5	4	3	2	1

Pos	Team	HOC (Germany)		NÜR (Germany)		MOS (Czech Republic)		HOC (Germany)		MAG (France)		MZA (Italy)		Pts
1	(Switzerland) Daltec Racing	2	1	1	1	1	2	2	2	2	3	3	1	102
2	(Switzerland) Jo Zeller Racing	1	3	2	3	4	5	4	1	1	1	1	4	95
3	(Switzerland) Hope Pole Vision Racing	Ret	10	6	4	2	1	1	3	6	2	2	2	78
4	(Germany) CSR Motorsport	4	4	10	5	Ret	4	3	4	3	5	5	5	58
5	(Switzerland) Felix Racing Team	3	6	11	8	3	8	8	10	10	10	9	6	44
6	(Italy) Torino Motorsport	5	8	8	9	Ret	Ret	6	8	8	7	7	Ret	36
7	(Switzerland) ACS Schweiz	11	Ret	Ret	11			Ret	11	11	Ret	11	10	3
Pos	Driver	HOC (Germany)		NÜR (Germany)		MOS (Czech Republic)		HOC (Germany)		MAG (France)		MZA (Italy)		Pts
