= Melville McKee =

British racing driver (born 1994)

- Nationality: (United Kingdom) British
- Born: 19 August 1994 (age 32) Singapore
- Relatives: Mike McKee (grandfather)

GP3 Series career
- Debut season: 2013
- Current team: Bamboo Engineering
- Car number: 20
- Starts: 14
- Wins: 1
- Poles: 0
- Fastest laps: 1

Previous series
- 2011–13 2011–12 2010: Eurocup Formula Renault 2.0; Formula Renault 2.0 Alps; Formula Lista Junior

Melville McKee (born 19 August 1994) is a British former racing driver. He last drove for Bamboo Engineering in the GP3 Series. His grandfather Mike was a Formula Two and FIA World Endurance Championship racing driver.

== Career ==
=== Karting ===
McKee began karting at the age of six, contesting until 2003 in Australian championships. From 2004 to 2009, he competed mostly in various Swiss championships. In 2009, he became runner-up in the Junior class of the Rotax Max Challenge.

=== Formula Lista Junior ===
McKee began his formula racing career in 2010 in Formula Lista Junior with Hope Pole Vision Racing. He won races at Most and Hockenheim with another five podiums, finishing the season on the third place in the standings.

=== Formula Renault ===
In 2011, McKee graduated to the Formula Renault 2.0 Alps championship, signing with ARTA Engineering. He won race at Spielberg and Imola with podium at Budapest on his way to fourth place and Junior's Championship title. Also he spent four races in Eurocup Formula Renault 2.0 with the same team.

For the next year, McKee remained in both series but switched to Interwetten Racing and focused on the Eurocup. His best result was second place at Nürburgring, that brought him eight place in the standings. In Alps championship he had two podiums at Monza and Spielberg.

McKee started his third consecutive season in Eurocup with Manor MP Motorsport.

=== GP3 Series ===
McKee made his GP3 Series debut in 2013, competing for Bamboo Engineering. He did not compete in the final round at Yas Marina Circuit, and finished the season in 14th position, with one race win at the Nürburgring.

== Racing record ==
=== Career summary ===
| Season | Series | Team | Races | Wins | Poles | F/Laps | Podiums | Points | Position |
|---|---|---|---|---|---|---|---|---|---|
| 2010 | Formula Lista Junior | Hope Pole Vision Racing | 12 | 2 | 0 | 0 | 7 | 135 | **3rd** |
| 2011 | Formula Renault 2.0 Alps | ARTA Engineering | 14 | 3 | 3 | 1 | 4 | 229 | 4th |
| 2011 | Eurocup Formula Renault 2.0 | ARTA Engineering | 6 | 0 | 0 | 0 | 0 | 1 | 25th |
| 2011 | Formula Renault UK Finals Series | Interwetten Racing | 6 | 0 | 0 | 0 | 0 | 41 | 17th |
| 2012 | Eurocup Formula Renault 2.0 | Interwetten.com Racing | 14 | 0 | 0 | 1 | 1 | 64 | 8th |
| 2012 | Formula Renault 2.0 Alps | Interwetten.com Racing | 6 | 0 | 0 | 0 | 2 | 48 | 10th |
| 2013 | GP3 Series | Bamboo Engineering | 14 | 1 | 0 | 1 | 1 | 31 | 14th |
| 2013 | Eurocup Formula Renault 2.0 | Manor MP Motorsport | 2 | 0 | 0 | 0 | 0 | 0 | 26th |

=== Complete Formula Renault 2.0 Alps Series results ===
(key) (Races in bold indicate pole position; races in italics indicate fastest lap)

| Year | Team | 1 | 2 | 3 | 4 | 5 | 6 | 7 | 8 | 9 | 10 | 11 | 12 | 13 | 14 | Pos | Points |
|---|---|---|---|---|---|---|---|---|---|---|---|---|---|---|---|---|---|
| 2011 | ARTA Engineering | MNZ; 1; 15 | MNZ; 2; 4 | **IMO**; **1**; 1 | **IMO**; **2**; 1 | PAU; 1; 4 | PAU; 2; 9 | **RBR**; **1**; 1 | **RBR**; **2**; 19 | HUN; 1; 14 | HUN; 2; 3 | LEC; 1 Ret | LEC; 2; 8 | SPA; 1; 7 | SPA; 2; 10 | 4th | 229 |
| 2012 | Interwetten.com Racing Team | MNZ; 1; 2 | MNZ; 2 Ret | PAU; 1; 6 | PAU; 2; 13 | IMO; 1 | IMO; 2 | SPA; 1 | SPA; 2 | RBR; 1; 8 | RBR; 2; 2 | MUG; 1 | MUG; 2 | CAT; 1 | CAT; 2 | 10th | 48 |

=== Complete Eurocup Formula Renault 2.0 results ===
(key) (Races in bold indicate pole position; races in italics indicate fastest lap)

| Year | Entrant | 1 | 2 | 3 | 4 | 5 | 6 | 7 | 8 | 9 | 10 | 11 | 12 | 13 | 14 | DC | Points |
|---|---|---|---|---|---|---|---|---|---|---|---|---|---|---|---|---|---|
| 2011 | ARTA Engineering | ALC; 1 | ALC; 2 | SPA; 1 | SPA; 2 | NÜR; 1; 30 | NÜR; 2 Ret | HUN; 1 | HUN; 2 | SIL; 1; 10 | SIL; 2; 15 | LEC; 1; 24 | LEC; 2; 22 | CAT; 1 | CAT; 2 | 25th | 1 |
| 2012 | Interwetten.com Racing | ALC; 1 Ret | ALC; 2; 15 | SPA; 1 Ret | SPA; 2; 14 | NÜR; 1; 9 | NÜR; 2; 2 | MSC; 1; 6 | MSC; 2; 7 | HUN; 1; 8 | HUN; 2; 5 | LEC; 1; 8 | LEC; 2; 7 | CAT; 1; 7 | CAT; 2 Ret | 8th | 64 |
| 2013 | Manor MP Motorsport | ALC; 1; 11 | ALC; 2; 20 | SPA; 1 | SPA; 2 | MSC; 1 | MSC; 2 | RBR; 1 | RBR; 2 | HUN; 1 | HUN; 2 | LEC; 1 | LEC; 2 | CAT; 1 | CAT; 2 | 26th | 0 |

=== Complete GP3 Series results ===
(key) (Races in bold indicate pole position) (Races in italics indicate fastest lap)

| Year | Entrant | 1 | 2 | 3 | 4 | 5 | 6 | 7 | 8 | 9 | 10 | 11 | 12 | 13 | 14 | 15 | 16 | D.C. | Points |
|---|---|---|---|---|---|---|---|---|---|---|---|---|---|---|---|---|---|---|---|
| 2013 | Bamboo Engineering | CAT; FEA; 14 | CAT; SPR; Ret | VAL; FEA; 11 | VAL; SPR; Ret | SIL; FEA; 24 | SIL; SPR; 15 | NÜR; FEA; 7 | NÜR; SPR; 1 | HUN; FEA; 17 | HUN; SPR; Ret | SPA; FEA; 7 | SPA; SPR; Ret | MNZ; FEA; 12 | MNZ; SPR; 7 | YMC; FEA | YMC; SPR | 14th | 31 |

Sporting positions
| Preceded by Inaugural | Formula Renault 2.0 Alps; Junior Champion; 2011 | Succeeded by Patrick Kujala |
