= Thomas Jäger (Austrian racing driver) =

Austrian racing driver (born 1994)

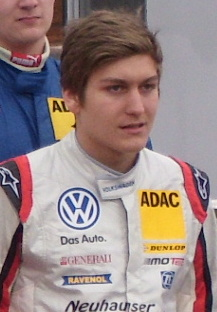
- Thomas Jäger, is an Austrian racing driver.
- Nationality: (Austria) Austrian
- Born: 16 August 1994 (age 32) Vienna, Austria

Blancpain Sprint Series career
- Debut season: 2014
- Current team: BMW Team Schubert
- Categorisation: FIA Silver
- Car number: 76
- Starts: 6
- Wins: 1
- Poles: 0
- Fastest laps: 0

Previous series
- 2013 2011–12 2011–12 2011 2011: ATS Formel 3 Cup; ADAC Formel Masters; Formula Renault 2.0 Alps; Eurocup Formula Renault 2.0; Formula Renault UK Winter Series

Thomas Jäger (born 16 August 1994) is an Austrian former racing driver who last competed in the ATS Formel 3 Cup for Performance Racing.

== Career ==
=== Karting ===
Jäger, born in Vienna, Austria, entered the KF3 category of the Italian Open Masters in 2008, racing for BRM Racing Srl; he scored one point, and finished 31st. He graduated into the KF2 category in 2009, now competing in the Bridgestone Cup Europe; he again finished in 31st place. In 2010, he entered multiple KF2-based series, driving for KSB Racing Team; the Karting World Championship, where he finished 19th, the European KF2 Championship, where he finished 30th, the WSK Euro Series, where he was classified 40th in the KF2 category, having not scored a point, the Bridgestone Cup Europe, where he was classified fifth in the KF2 category; and the German Kart Championship, where he was classified sixth, with 73 points.

=== Car racing ===
In 2011, Jäger started his car racing career. He entered the Formula Renault 2.0 Alps, driving for Interwetten.com Junior Team, and finished third in the first race at Monza, winning the Junior class, before finishing sixth in race two. He then entered the first two rounds of the Eurocup Formula Renault 2.0 with Interwetten.com Junior Team. In the first round of the Formula Renault Eurocup season, held at Aragón, he finished 16th in the first race, and retired in the second. The next round, held at Spa-Francorchamps, saw him finish 17th and 15th in the two races of the day. He then returned to the Formula Renault 2.0 Alps for the next two rounds of that series, taking two fourth places at Imola, and a fifth at Pau. Prior to the Red Bull Ring round, Jäger switched to EPIC Racing; he finished ninth in race one, and 18th in race two. Jäger then returned to the Formula Renault Eurocup for the Nürburgring round, finishing 24th in race one, and retiring from the second race. At the Hungaroring, both series were running events on the same weekend; he finished sixth and eighth in the Formula Renault Alps races, and 18th and 19th in the Formula Renault Eurocup races. His next race came in the ADAC Formel Masters series' penultimate round, held at TT Circuit Assen and driving for Neuhauser Racing; he took a podium in the first race, before finishing 11th in race two, and 12th in race three. He finished the season by competing in the Formula Renault 2.0 UK Winter Series for Fortec Competition; his best finish was a third place at Rockingham. Although he failed to score any points in the Formula Renault Eurocup, he was classified seventh in the Formula Renault Alps, with 150 points, sixth in the Formula Renault UK Winter series, with 79 points; and 17th in the ADAC Formel Masters, with 15 points.

In 2012, Jäger entered the Formula Renault 2.0 Alps for the second time, driving for One Racing, with Alex Bosak being named as his teammate. He also competed in the ADAC Formel Masters with Neuhauser Racing, winning his first race at Oschersleben.

In 2013, Jäger moved into the ATS Formel 3 Cup, driving for Performance Racing. He finished second during race two of the Lausitzring round, and took his first victory in the series in the second race at the Nürburgring. He finished the season in sixth place, and was classified fifth in the rookie's standings. In an interview with the Polish website Motorsport Grand Prix in 2014, he announced that he would be competing in GT racing, and that he saw this discipline being the future of motorsport.

== Racing record ==
=== Complete Formula Renault 2.0 NEC results ===
(key) (Races in bold indicate pole position) (Races in italics indicate fastest lap)

Year	Entrant	1	2	3	4	5	6	7	8	9	10	11	12	13	14	15	16	17	18	19	20	DC	Points
2011	Interwetten.com Racing Junior Team	HOC; 1	HOC; 2	HOC; 3	SPA; 1; 19	SPA; 2; 15	NÜR; 1	NÜR; 2	ASS; 1	ASS; 2	ASS; 3	OSC; 1	OSC; 2	ZAN; 1	ZAN; 2	MST; 1	MST; 2	MST; 3	MNZ; 1	MNZ; 2	MNZ; 3	NC†	0

† As Jäger was a guest driver, he was ineligible for points

=== Complete Eurocup Formula Renault 2.0 results ===
(key) (Races in bold indicate pole position; races in italics indicate fastest lap)

Year	Entrant	1	2	3	4	5	6	7	8	9	10	11	12	13	14	DC	Points
2011	Interwetten.com Racing Junior Team	ALC; 1; 16	ALC; 2 Ret	SPA; 1; 19	SPA; 2; 15											34th	0
2011	EPIC Racing					NÜR; 1; 24	NÜR; 2 Ret	HUN; 1; 18	HUN; 2; 19	SIL; 1	SIL; 2	LEC; 1	LEC; 2	CAT; 1	CAT; 2	34th	0

=== Complete Formula Renault 2.0 Alps Series results ===
(key) (Races in bold indicate pole position; races in italics indicate fastest lap)

Year	Team	1	2	3	4	5	6	7	8	9	10	11	12	13	14	Pos	Points
2011	Interwetten.com Junior Team	MNZ; 1; 3	MNZ; 2; 6	IMO; 1; 4	IMO; 2; 4	PAU; 1; 5	PAU; 2 Ret	RBR; 1; 9	RBR; 2; 18	HUN; 1; 6	HUN; 2; 8	LEC; 1	LEC; 2	SPA; 1	SPA; 2	7th	150
2012	One Racing	MNZ; 1; 10	MNZ; 2; 9	PAU; 1; 14	PAU; 2; 23	IMO; 1	IMO; 2	SPA; 1	SPA; 2	RBR; 1	RBR; 2	MUG; 1	MUG; 2	CAT; 1	CAT; 2	23rd	3
