= Richard Gonda =

Slovak racing driver

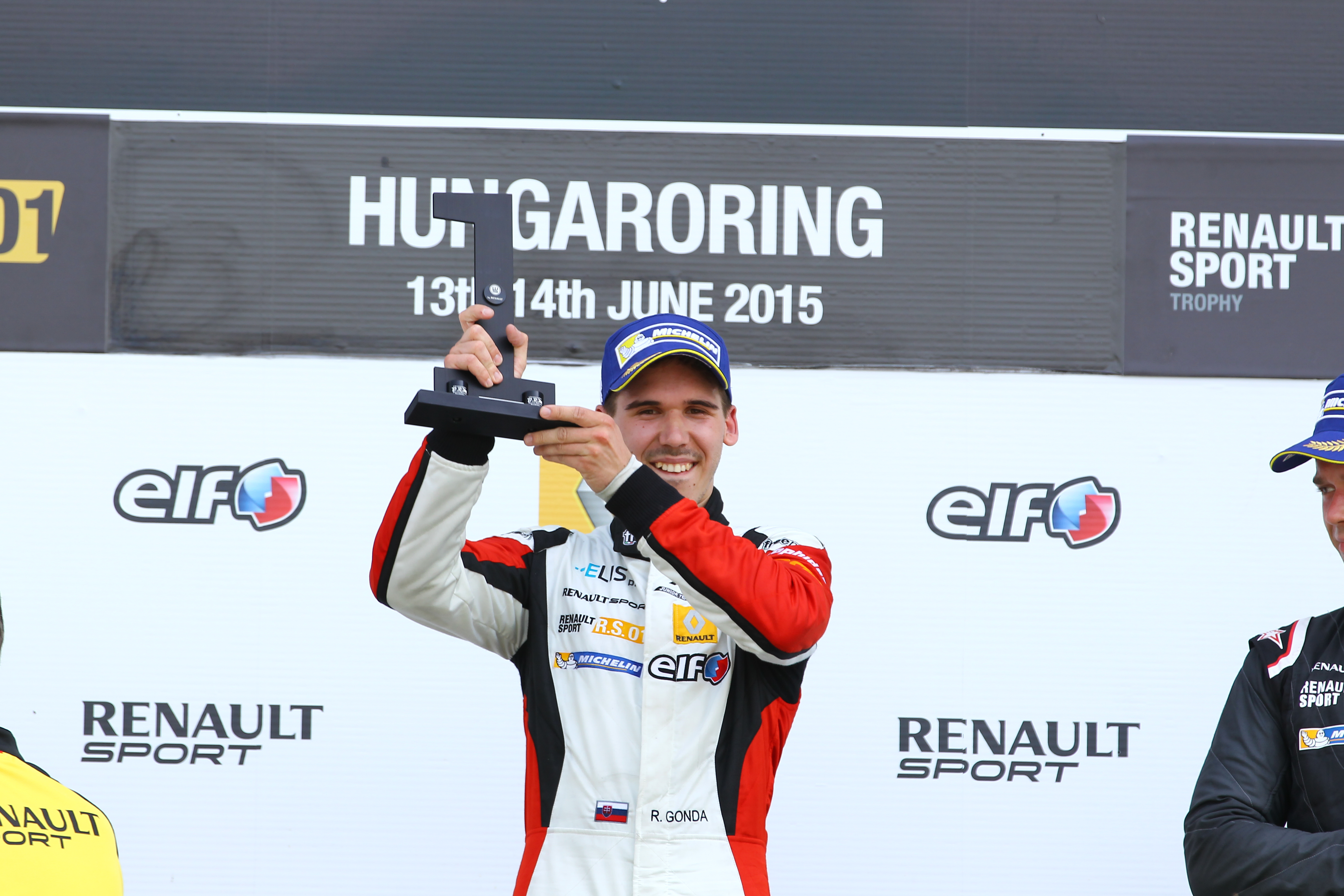
- Nationality: (Slovakia) Slovak
- Born: 14 March 1994 (age 32) Banská Bystrica, Slovakia

Auto GP career
- Debut season: 2014
- Current team: Virtuosi UK
- Car number: 6
- Starts: 2
- Wins: 0
- Poles: 0
- Fastest laps: 0
- Best finish: 22nd in 2014

Previous series
- 2013 2012 2010–12 2010–11 2010: European F3 Open - Copa; FIA Formula Two Championship; Formula Renault 2.0 NEC; Eurocup Formula Renault 2.0; CEZ Championship E2-2000

Championship titles
- 2013: European F3 Open - Copa

Richard Gonda (born 14 March 1994, in Banská Bystrica) is a professional racing driver from Slovakia.

== Career ==
=== Karting ===
Gonda began karting in 2003 and raced primarily in his native Slovakia for the majority of his career, working his way up from the junior ranks with the seven national titles.

=== CEZ Championship E2-2000 and Formula Renault ===
In 2010, Gonda graduated to single-seaters, racing in the Central European Zone Championship E2-2000 series. He finished sixth with 37 points. He also completed in three rounds of the Formula Renault 2.0 Northern European Cup FR-2000 Class with Sophidea team and in Eurocup Formula Renault 2.0 round at Silverstone Circuit with Krenek Motorsport.

Gonda expanded his Eurocup Formula Renault 2.0 campaign in 2011, staying with Krenek Motorsport. He finished all but one races, without scoring a point. He also contested in three rounds of the Formula Renault 2.0 NEC series. And continued in the NEC series in the next year.

=== FIA Formula Two Championship ===
In 2012, Gonda graduated into the FIA Formula Two Championship.

== Racing record ==
=== Career summary ===
Season	Series	Team	Races	Wins	Poles	F/Laps	Podiums	Points	Position
2010	Formula Renault 2.0 NEC FR2000	Sophidea	10	0	0	0	0	107	11th
2010	Eurocup Formula Renault 2.0	Krenek Motorsport	2	0	0	0	0	0	NC
2010	Central European Zone Championship E2-2000		?	?	?	?	?	37	6th
2011	Eurocup Formula Renault 2.0	Krenek Motorsport	14	0	0	0	0	0	39th
2011	Formula Renault 2.0 NEC	Krenek Motorsport	7	0	0	0	0	18	40th
2012	Formula Renault 2.0 NEC	Krenek Motorsport	4	0	0	0	0	15	38th
2012	FIA Formula Two Championship	Motorsport Vision	2	0	0	0	0	4	16th
2013	European F3 Open	Drivex School	16	0	0	0	0	10	18th
2013	European F3 Open - Copa	Drivex School	16	7	0	0	11	100	**1st**
2014	Formula Acceleration 1	Acceleration Team Slovakia	10	0	0	0	3	94	**3rd**
2014	Auto GP	Virtuosi UK	4	0	0	0	0	0	22nd
2015	Renault Sport Trophy - Prestige	ART Junior Team	9	3	6	4	5	123	**2nd**
2015	Renault Sport Endurance Trophy	ART Junior Team	6	2	2	1	5	95	**2nd**
2016	GP3 Series	Jenzer Motorsport	6	0	0	0	0	0	25th
2017	Porsche Carrera Cup Germany	Zele Racing	6	0	0	0	0	6	26th
2017	International GT Open	Senkyr Motorsport	2	0	0	0	0	0	NC†
2017	24H Series - 991	MSG Motorsport							
2018	International GT Open	Senkyr Motorsport	4	0	0	0	1	34	13th
2019	International GT Open	Senkyr Motorsport	6	0	0	0	1	33	11th
2019	24H GT Series - GT4	Senkyr Motorsport							
2022	24H GT Series - GT4	Senkyr Motorsport							
2023	24H GT Series - GT4	Senkyr Motorsport							
2023	GT Winter Series	Senkyr Motorsport	?	?	?	?	?	7.14	88th
2025	ADAC GT Masters	Senkyr Motorsport	2	0	0	0	0	0	NC†
2025	Porsche Sprint Challenge Central Europe	Senkyr Motorsport	3	3	1	2	3	0	NC†

^{†} As Gonda was a guest driver, he was ineligible for championship points.

=== Complete Formula Renault 2.0 NEC FR2000 results ===
(key) (Races in bold indicate pole position) (Races in italics indicate fastest lap)

Year	Entrant	1	2	3	4	5	6	7	8	9	10	11	12	13	14	15	16	17	18	19	20	DC	Points
2010	Sophidea	HOC; 1; 14	HOC; 2; 13	BRN; 1; 21	BRN; 2; 23	ZAN; 1	ZAN; 2	OSC; 1; 16	OSC; 2; 16	OSC; 3; 16	ASS; 1	ASS; 2	MST; 1 Ret	MST; 2 Ret	MST; 3; 16	SPA; 1	SPA; 2	SPA; 3	NÜR; 1	NÜR; 2	NÜR; 3	11th	107

=== Complete Eurocup Formula Renault 2.0 results ===
(key) (Races in bold indicate pole position; races in italics indicate fastest lap)

Year	Entrant	1	2	3	4	5	6	7	8	9	10	11	12	13	14	15	16	DC	Points
2010	Krenek Motorsport	ALC; 1	ALC; 2	SPA; 1	SPA; 2	BRN; 1	BRN; 2	MAG; 1	MAG; 2	HUN; 1	HUN; 2	HOC; 1	HOC; 2	SIL; 1; 23	SIL; 2; 20	CAT; 1	CAT; 2	NC†	0
2011	Krenek Motorsport	ALC; 1; 19	ALC; 2 Ret	SPA; 1; 29	SPA; 2; 31	NÜR; 1; 28	NÜR; 2; 18	HUN; 1; 25	HUN; 2; 26	SIL; 1; 25	SIL; 2; 28	LEC; 1; 29	LEC; 2; 28	CAT; 1; 28	CAT; 2; 30			38th	0

† As Gonda was a guest driver, he was ineligible for points

=== Complete Formula Renault 2.0 NEC results ===
(key) (Races in bold indicate pole position) (Races in italics indicate fastest lap)

Year	Entrant	1	2	3	4	5	6	7	8	9	10	11	12	13	14	15	16	17	18	19	20	DC	Points
2011	Krenek Motorsport	HOC; 1	HOC; 2	HOC; 3	SPA; 1; 29	SPA; 2; 31	NÜR; 1; 19	NÜR; 2; 23	ASS; 1	ASS; 2	ASS; 3	OSC; 1	OSC; 2	ZAN; 1	ZAN; 2	MST; 1; 11	MST; 2; 15	MST; 3 Ret	MNZ; 1	MNZ; 2	MNZ; 3	39th	18
2012	Krenek Motorsport	HOC; 1; 24	HOC; 2; 24	HOC; 3; 14	NÜR; 1 DNS	NÜR; 2 DNS	OSC; 1 DNS	OSC; 2; 19	OSC; 3; 15	ASS; 1	ASS; 2	RBR; 1	RBR; 2	MST; 1	MST; 2	MST; 3	ZAN; 1	ZAN; 2	ZAN; 3	SPA; 1	SPA; 2	38th	15

=== Complete Auto GP results ===
(key) (Races in bold indicate pole position) (Races in italics indicate fastest lap)

Year	Entrant	1	2	3	4	5	6	7	8	9	10	11	12	13	14	15	16	Pos	Points
2014	Virtuosi UK	MAR; 1; 11†	MAR; 2 Ret	LEC; 1 WD	LEC; 2 WD	HUN; 1	HUN; 2	MNZ; 1	MNZ; 2	IMO; 1	IMO; 2	RBR; 1	RBR; 2	NÜR; 1	NÜR; 2	EST; 1	EST; 2	22nd	0

=== Complete GP3 Series results ===
(key) (Races in bold indicate pole position) (Races in italics indicate fastest lap)

Year	Entrant	1	2	3	4	5	6	7	8	9	10	11	12	13	14	15	16	17	18	Pos	Pts
2016	Jenzer Motorsport	CAT; FEA; 13	CAT; SPR; 17	RBR; FEA; 19	RBR; SPR; Ret	SIL; FEA	SIL; SPR	HUN; FEA; 13	HUN; SPR; 15	HOC; FEA	HOC; SPR	SPA; FEA	SPA; SPR	MNZ; FEA	MNZ; SPR	SEP; FEA	SEP; SPR	YMC; FEA	YMC; SPR	25th	0

Sporting positions
Preceded by Kevin Giovesi	European F3 Open; Copa Champion; 2013	Succeeded by Costantino Peroni
