= Javier Tarancón =

Spanish racing driver

Javier Tarancon
- Nationality: (Spain) Spanish
- Born: 23 November 1991 (age 34) Barcelona, Spain

Eurocup F Renault career
- Debut season: 2010
- Current team: Tech 1 Racing
- Car number: 1
- Former teams: Epsilon Euskadi
- Starts: 20
- Wins: 1
- Poles: 0
- Fastest laps: 0
- Best finish: 8th in 2011

Previous series
- Formula BMW Europe; Formula Renault 2.0 NEC; Formula Renault 2.0 Alps

Javier Tarancón Sallo (born 23 November 1991) is a Spanish racing driver who has raced in karting, Formula BMW and Formula Renault. His career began in 2000 at the age of eight.

== Career ==
=== Karting ===
In 2000, Tarancón finished tenth in the Catalonia Karting Championship but won the Social Vendrell Karting Championship. In 2001, he again took the title in Social Vendrell Karting and finished third in three other competitions: the Championship Catalonia, Toyota Open and the Race of Champions (as a cadet). In 2002, Tarancón was second in Social Vendrell Karting but fifth in the Race of Champions, and in 2003 finished fourth in the Spanish Karting Trophy.

Tarancón raced with Yamaha in 2004, gaining a second place in the Spanish championships and in the Catalonia championships one victory, 11 second places and two third places. In 2005, he took part in four different championships, including the European Junior Championship and the Spanish Karting Championship. He finished sixth in the Junior Champions race and fourth in the Industria Karting Trophy. 2006 saw Tarancón finish 26th after taking part in the race in the Andrea Margutti Trophy, and finished third in the August Martins trophy. He was also seventh in the Open Masters Italia and won the Spanish Karting Championship.

In 2007, Tarancón was runner-up in the WSK Internacional Series and third in the European Championship of KF2 as well as third in the Asia Pacific Championship in Japan.

In 2008, Tarancón joined the Autosport Academy and his results were as follows:

- 3rd and 6th at Ledenon, France
- 3rd at Pau, France
- 3rd at Magny-Cours, France
- 3rd and 2nd at the Circuit de Spa-Francorchamps, Belgium
- 7th and 4th at the Masaryk Circuit, Brno, Czech Republic
- 7th at Le Mans, France
- 3rd at Snetterton

=== Formula racing ===
In 2009, Tarancón moved on to the Formula BMW Championship in Europe and finished the championship in 12th place overall after scoring 92 points, racing at tracks such as Barcelona, Budapest, Monza and winning at Spa. For 2010, he was a guest driver in the Eurocup Formula Renault Series at the last rounds, contesting at Hockenheim, Silverstone and Catalunya.

In 2011, Tarancón contested a full season in Eurocup Formula Renault, finishing in eighth place. At the first race in Alcaniz, he failed to finish before taking sixth. At Spa, he was tenth and seventh, taking the fastest lap in the latter, at the Nurburgring he finished ninth before retiring, in Hungary he had a pair of fifth places before a disappointing Silverstone weekend, 14th and retiring. At Paul Ricard, he scored only three points.

At his home race, the final at Catalunya, Tarancón took his first victory, sharing the podium with Carlos Sainz Jr. and Daniil Kvyat.

In 2012, Tarancón contested the Formula Renault 2.0 Championship.

== Racing record ==
=== Complete Formula Renault 2.0 Alps Series results ===
(key) (Races in bold indicate pole position; races in italics indicate fastest lap)

Year	Team	1	2	3	4	5	6	7	8	9	10	11	12	13	14	Pos	Points
2011	Tech 1 Racing	**MNZ**; **1**; 8	**MNZ**; **2**; 9	IMO; 1; 2	IMO; 2; 2	**PAU**; **1**; 1	**PAU**; **2**; 1	RBR; 1 Ret	RBR; 2; 4	**HUN**; **1**; 1	**HUN**; **2**; 2	LEC; 1; 2	LEC; 2; 3	SPA; 1; 6	SPA; 2; 4	1st	334

=== Complete Eurocup Formula Renault 2.0 results ===
(key) (Races in bold indicate pole position; races in italics indicate fastest lap)

Year	Entrant	1	2	3	4	5	6	7	8	9	10	11	12	13	14	15	16	DC	Points
2010	Epsilon Euskadi	ALC; 1	ALC; 2	SPA; 1	SPA; 2	BRN; 1	BRN; 2	MAG; 1	MAG; 2	HUN; 1	HUN; 2	HOC; 1; 4	HOC; 2; 4	SIL; 1; 2	SIL; 2; 1	CAT; 1; 5	CAT; 2; 15	NC†	0
2011	Tech 1 Racing	ALC; 1 Ret	ALC; 2; 6	SPA; 1; 10	SPA; 2; 7	NÜR; 1; 9	NÜR; 2 Ret	HUN; 1; 5	HUN; 2; 5	SIL; 1; 14	SIL; 2 Ret	LEC; 1; 10	LEC; 2; 9	CAT; 1; 1	CAT; 2; 4			8th	78
2012	RC Formula	ALC; 1; 7	ALC; 2 Ret	SPA; 1; 8	SPA; 2 Ret	NÜR; 1; 16	NÜR; 2; 7	MSC; 1; 16	MSC; 2; 18	HUN; 1; 10	HUN; 2; 8	**LEC**; **1**; 11	LEC; 2; 15	CAT; 1	CAT; 2			19th	21

† As Tarancón was a guest driver, he was ineligible for points

=== Complete Formula Renault 2.0 NEC results ===
(key) (Races in bold indicate pole position) (Races in italics indicate fastest lap)

Year	Entrant	1	2	3	4	5	6	7	8	9	10	11	12	13	14	15	16	17	18	19	20	DC	Points
2010	Epsilon Euskadi	HOC; 1	HOC; 2	BRN; 1	BRN; 2	ZAN; 1	ZAN; 2	OSC; 1	OSC; 2	OSC; 3	ASS; 1	ASS; 2	MST; 1	MST; 2	MST; 3	SPA; 1 Ret	SPA; 2; 3	SPA; 3; 5	NÜR; 1	NÜR; 2	NÜR; 3	24th	36
2011	Tech 1 Racing	HOC; 1	HOC; 2	HOC; 3	SPA; 1; 10	SPA; 2; 7	NÜR; 1	NÜR; 2	ASS; 1	ASS; 2	ASS; 3	OSC; 1	OSC; 2	ZAN; 1	ZAN; 2	MST; 1	MST; 2	MST; 3	MNZ; 1	MNZ; 2	MNZ; 3	NC†	0

† As Tarancón was a guest driver, he was ineligible for points.
