= 2011 Formula Renault 2.0 Northern European Cup =

Motor racing championship

2011 Formula Renault 2.0 NEC

Seasons
- ← 2010 2012 →

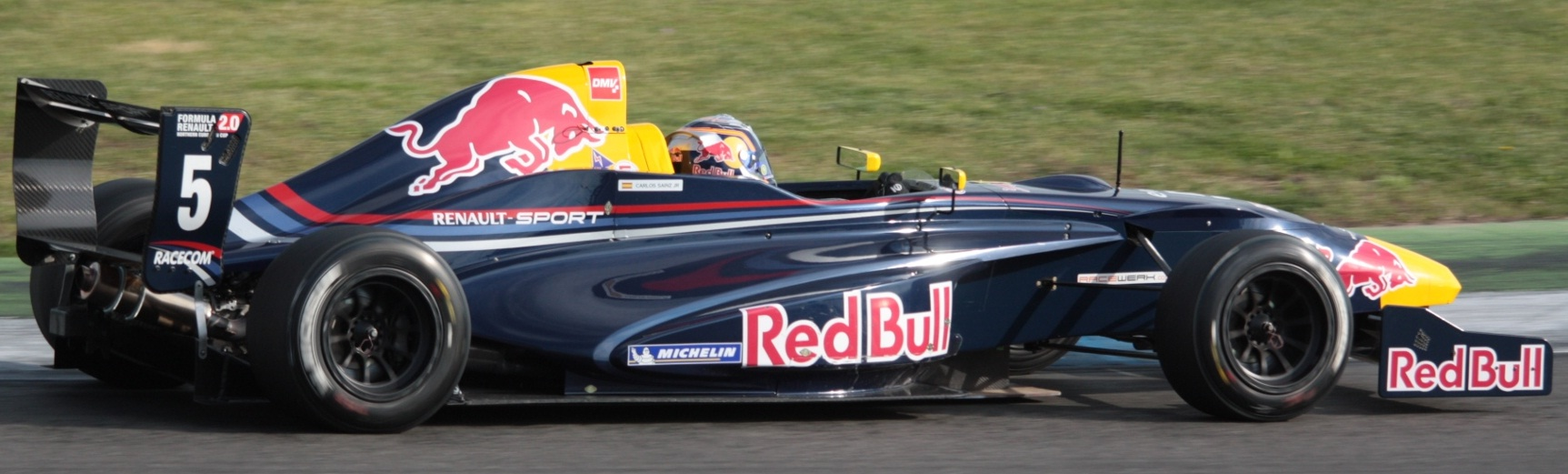
Carlos Sainz, Jr., the 2011 series champion, driving at the Preis der Stadt Stuttgart, the first event of the season

The 2011 Formula Renault 2.0 Northern European Cup (a Formula Renault motor racing championship), was the sixth Formula Renault 2.0 Northern European Cup season, a one-make formula series held across Europe. The season began at Hockenheimring on 17 April and finished on 25 September at Monza, after 20 races at 8 events. The championship was won by the Spanish driver Carlos Sainz, Jr. His team, Finnish Koiranen, secured the teams' championship.

== Drivers and teams ==
Team	No.	Driver name	Rounds
(France) Tech 1 Racing	1	(Spain) Javier Tarancón	2
(France) Tech 1 Racing	2	(France) Paul-Loup Chatin	2
(France) Tech 1 Racing	3	(France) Grégoire Demoustier	2
(France) Tech 1 Racing	4	(Finland) Miki Weckström	2
(Finland) Koiranen bros.	5	(Spain) Carlos Sainz Jr.	All
(Finland) Koiranen bros.	6	(Russia) Daniil Kvyat	All
(Finland) Koiranen bros.	7	(Finland) Joni Wiman	1–4
(Finland) Koiranen bros.	8	(Estonia) Karl-Oscar Liiv	1
(Finland) Koiranen bros.	8	(Sweden) John Bryant-Meisner	2–8
(Finland) Koiranen bros.	22	(Estonia) Hans Villemi	7–8
(Austria) Interwetten.com Racing Junior Team	9	(Sweden) Timmy Hansen	2
(Austria) Interwetten.com Racing Junior Team	10	(Austria) Thomas Jäger	2
(Austria) Interwetten.com Racing Junior Team	11	(United States) Gustavo Menezes	2
(Netherlands) Van Amersfoort Racing	9	(United Kingdom) Jack Hawksworth	8
(Netherlands) Van Amersfoort Racing	10	(Netherlands) Meindert van Buuren	1–7
(Netherlands) Van Amersfoort Racing	11	(Netherlands) Dennis van de Laar	All
(United Kingdom) Atech Reid GP	12	(United Kingdom) Oscar King	5
(United Kingdom) Atech Reid GP	28	(Cyprus) Tio Ellinas	5
(Germany) SL Formula Racing	14	(Belgium) Alessio Picariello	All
(Germany) SL Formula Racing	15	(Germany) Sebastian von Gartzen	1–4, 7–8
(Germany) SL Formula Racing	27	(United Kingdom) Alice Powell	5
(Spain) EPIC Racing	14	(Spain) Alex Riberas	2
(Spain) EPIC Racing	15	(France) Florian Le Roux	2
(Netherlands) MP Motorsport	16	(United Kingdom) Jordan King	5–8
(Netherlands) MP Motorsport	17	(Russia) Aleksey Chuklin	All
(Netherlands) MP Motorsport	19	(Estonia) Johannes Moor	1–2
(Netherlands) MP Motorsport	19	(Sweden) Kevin Kleveros	2, 4
(Netherlands) MP Motorsport	23	(Estonia) Karl-Oscar Liiv	2–3, 5–8
(Belgium) Speedlover	20	(Netherlands) Frank Suntjens	All
(Belgium) Speedlover	24	(Israel) Rafael Danieli	1–6
(Finland) P1 Motorsport	21	(Finland) Harri Salminen	1–2
(Finland) P1 Motorsport	48	(Finland) Oskari Kurki-Suonio	7–8
(Finland) P1 Motorsport	60	(Finland) Mikko Perttala	1
(Finland) Koiranen Junior	22	(Estonia) Hans Villemi	1–6
(Finland) Koiranen Junior	23	(Sweden) John Bryant-Meisner	1
(Finland) Koiranen Junior	24	(Estonia) Martin Rump	7
(Finland) Koiranen Junior	41	(Australia) Jordan Oon	8
(Finland) Koiranen Junior	88	(Israel) Rafael Danieli	7–8
(Italy) Cram Competition	22	(Brazil) Henrique Martins	2
(Italy) Cram Competition	23	(Russia) Denis Nagulin	2
(Italy) One Racing	24	(Italy) Vittorio Ghirelli	2
(Italy) One Racing	25	(Italy) Edolo Ghirelli	2
(Poland) Inter Europol Competition	25	(Poland) Jakub Śmiechowski	All
(Poland) Inter Europol Competition	61	(France) Remi Kirchdörffer	7–8
(Czech Republic) Krenek Motorsport	26	(Slovakia) Richard Gonda	2–3, 7
(France) Boetti Racing Team	26	(Russia) Roman Mavlanov	2
(United Kingdom) Fortec Motorsport	27	(Puerto Rico) Félix Serrallés	2
(United Kingdom) Fortec Motorsport	28	(United Kingdom) Will Stevens	2
(United Kingdom) Fortec Motorsport	29	(Malaysia) Fahmi Ilyas	2
(Belgium) KTR	29	(United Kingdom) Josh Hill	5–8
(Belgium) KTR	36	(Belgium) Stoffel Vandoorne	All
(Belgium) KTR	37	(Netherlands) Liroy Stuart	1–4, 6
(France) R-ace GP	30	(France) Côme Ledogar	1–3, 6
(France) R-ace GP	31	(Netherlands) Pieter Schothorst	1–3, 6
(France) R-ace GP	32	(France) Norman Nato	1–3
(Germany) Josef Kaufmann Racing	33	(France) Mathieu Jaminet	2, 4
(Germany) Josef Kaufmann Racing	34	(Netherlands) Robin Frijns	1–4, 6
(Germany) Josef Kaufmann Racing	35	(Colombia) Óscar Andrés Tunjo	1–3
(Denmark) KEO Racing	38	(Thailand) Sandy Stuvik	1–2
(Denmark) KEO Racing	39	(Denmark) Dear Schilling	1
(Denmark) KEO Racing	40	(Sweden) Ronnie Lundströmer	4
(Denmark) KEO Racing	42	(United States) Robert Siska	1, 4–6, 8
(Denmark) KEO Racing	43	(Denmark) Johan Jokinen	8
(France) ARTA Engineering	40	(France) Yann Zimmer	2
(Sweden) Trackstar	44	(Sweden) Victor Bouveng	2–7
(Switzerland) Daltec Racing	46	(Switzerland) Christof von Grünigen	7–8
(Switzerland) Daltec Racing	47	(Switzerland) Mauro Calamia	7
(Estonia) Scuderia Nordica	62	(Sweden) Robert Myrsäter	1
(United Kingdom) Hillspeed	64	(United Kingdom) Sean Walkinshaw	6
(United Kingdom) Hillspeed	65	(United Kingdom) Howard Fuller	6
(United Kingdom) Hillspeed	66	(India) Zaamin Jaffer	6
(Switzerland) Böhlen Motorsport	67	(Switzerland) Kurt Böhlen	7
(Switzerland) Böhlen Motorsport	68	(Switzerland) Thomas Aregger	7

== Race calendar and results ==
The nine event provisional calendar for the 2011 season was announced on 25 November 2010. The final calendar consisting of eight events and 20 races was confirmed in January.

Round		Circuit	Date	Pole position	Fastest lap	Winning driver	Winning team	Event
1	R1	(Germany) Hockenheimring	9 April	(Spain) Carlos Sainz Jr.	(Netherlands) Robin Frijns	(Russia) Daniil Kvyat	(Finland) Koiranen bros.	Preis der Stadt Stuttgart
1	R2	(Germany) Hockenheimring	9 April	(Spain) Carlos Sainz Jr.	(Spain) Carlos Sainz Jr.	(Spain) Carlos Sainz Jr.	(Finland) Koiranen bros.	Preis der Stadt Stuttgart
1	R3	(Germany) Hockenheimring	10 April	(Sweden) John Bryant-Meisner	(Spain) Carlos Sainz Jr.	(Spain) Carlos Sainz Jr.	(Finland) Koiranen bros.	Preis der Stadt Stuttgart
2	R1	(Belgium) Circuit de Spa-Francorchamps	30 April	(Netherlands) Robin Frijns	(Spain) Carlos Sainz Jr.	(Spain) Carlos Sainz Jr.	(Finland) Koiranen bros.	World Series by Renault
2	R2	(Belgium) Circuit de Spa-Francorchamps	1 May	(Spain) Carlos Sainz Jr.	(Spain) Javier Tarancón	(Russia) Daniil Kvyat	(Finland) Koiranen bros.	World Series by Renault
3	R1	(Germany) Nürburgring	13 May	(Spain) Carlos Sainz Jr.	(Spain) Carlos Sainz Jr.	(Spain) Carlos Sainz Jr.	(Finland) Koiranen bros.	VLN
3	R2	(Germany) Nürburgring	14 May	(France) Norman Nato	(Spain) Carlos Sainz Jr.	(Spain) Carlos Sainz Jr.	(Finland) Koiranen bros.	VLN
4	R1	(Netherlands) TT Circuit Assen	4 June	(Spain) Carlos Sainz Jr.	(Netherlands) Robin Frijns	(Spain) Carlos Sainz Jr.	(Finland) Koiranen bros.	Superleague Formula
4	R2	(Netherlands) TT Circuit Assen	4 June	(Belgium) Stoffel Vandoorne	(Spain) Carlos Sainz Jr.	(Netherlands) Robin Frijns	(Germany) Josef Kaufmann Racing	Superleague Formula
4	R3	(Netherlands) TT Circuit Assen	5 June	(Sweden) Kevin Kleveros	(Spain) Carlos Sainz Jr.	(Finland) Joni Wiman	(Finland) Koiranen bros.	Superleague Formula
5	R1	(Germany) Motorsport Arena Oschersleben	30 July	(Cyprus) Tio Ellinas	(Russia) Daniil Kvyat	(Cyprus) Tio Ellinas	(United Kingdom) Atech Reid GP	WTCC
5	R2	(Germany) Motorsport Arena Oschersleben	31 July	(Belgium) Stoffel Vandoorne	(Spain) Carlos Sainz Jr.	(Spain) Carlos Sainz Jr.	(Finland) Koiranen bros.	WTCC
6	R1	(Netherlands) Circuit Park Zandvoort	13 August	(Spain) Carlos Sainz Jr.	(Russia) Daniil Kvyat	(Spain) Carlos Sainz Jr.	(Finland) Koiranen bros.	Masters of Formula 3
6	R2	(Netherlands) Circuit Park Zandvoort	14 August	(Spain) Carlos Sainz Jr.	(Spain) Carlos Sainz Jr.	(Spain) Carlos Sainz Jr.	(Finland) Koiranen bros.	Masters of Formula 3
7	R1	(Czech Republic) Autodrom Most	27 August	(Russia) Daniil Kvyat	(Spain) Carlos Sainz Jr.	(Russia) Daniil Kvyat	(Finland) Koiranen bros.	ADAC Truck Grand Prix
7	R2	(Czech Republic) Autodrom Most	28 August	(Spain) Carlos Sainz Jr.	(Spain) Carlos Sainz Jr.	(Spain) Carlos Sainz Jr.	(Finland) Koiranen bros.	ADAC Truck Grand Prix
7	R3	(Czech Republic) Autodrom Most	28 August	(United Kingdom) Josh Hill	(Russia) Daniil Kvyat	(Russia) Daniil Kvyat	(Finland) Koiranen bros.	ADAC Truck Grand Prix
8	R1	(Italy) Autodromo Nazionale Monza	24 September	(United Kingdom) Jordan King	(Russia) Daniil Kvyat	(Russia) Daniil Kvyat	(Finland) Koiranen bros.	AvD
8	R2	(Italy) Autodromo Nazionale Monza	25 September	(Russia) Daniil Kvyat	(Spain) Carlos Sainz Jr.	(Russia) Daniil Kvyat	(Finland) Koiranen bros.	AvD
8	R3	(Italy) Autodromo Nazionale Monza	25 September	(Belgium) Stoffel Vandoorne	(Russia) Daniil Kvyat	(Russia) Daniil Kvyat	(Finland) Koiranen bros.	AvD

== Championship standings ==
=== Drivers' Championship ===
- Championship points were awarded on a 30, 24, 20, 17, 16, 15, 14, 13, 12, 11, 10, 9, 8, 7, 6, 5, 4, 3, 2, 1 to the top 20 classified finishers in each race.

Pos	Driver	HOC (Germany)			SPA (Belgium)		NÜR (Germany)		ASS (Netherlands)			OSC (Germany)		ZAN (Netherlands)		MST (Czech Republic)			MNZ (Italy)			Points
Pos	Driver	1	2	3	4	5	6	7	8	9	10	11	12	13	14	15	16	17	18	19	20	Points
1	(Spain) Carlos Sainz Jr.	**3**	**1**	1	1	**3**	**1**	1	**1**	8	2	3	1	**1**	**1**	2	**1**	2	18	2	8	489
2	(Russia) Daniil Kvyat	1	3	5	4	1	8	9	9	2	6	5	3	2	6	**1**	2	1	1	**1**	1	441
3	(Belgium) Stoffel Vandoorne	4	4	2	15	Ret	6	3	8	**3**	17	2	**2**	3	4	3	11	8	6	4	**2**	328
4	(Netherlands) Robin Frijns	2	2	3	**3**	5	2	4	2	1	4			Ret	7							238
5	(Sweden) John Bryant-Meisner	6	10	**4**	34	14	11	11	Ret	12	11	12	5	5	8	5	8	3	11	Ret	9	224
6	(Belgium) Alessio Picariello	Ret	8	Ret	9	36	5	7	3	4	3	4	Ret	9	11	21	4	10	4	Ret	15	209
7	(Netherlands) Dennis van de Laar	7	16	Ret	18	18	Ret	22	7	11	7	9	7	11	Ret	9	13	6	9	10	11	186
8	(Estonia) Hans Villemi	Ret	Ret	12	26	25	13	12	18	9	9	11	11	6	Ret	7	10	5	17	7	10	174
9	(Estonia) Karl-Oskar Liiv	Ret	7	11	13	Ret	9	13				Ret	9	Ret	20	4	5	4	5	17	6	158
10	(United Kingdom) Jordan King											8	6	7	5	20	3	16	**2**	3	3	148
11	(Finland) Joni Wiman	5	6	Ret	14	Ret	12	8	4	7	1											129
12	(Poland) Jakub Śmiechowski	8	Ret	7	22	17	Ret	14	11	Ret	8	19	15	14	15	16	Ret	13	Ret	18	17	121
13	(Russia) Alexey Chuklin	12	Ret	18	35	27	18	17	Ret	17	15	13	16	17	10	14	16	12	15	6	12	118
14	(Netherlands) Liroy Stuart	17	14	9	17	30	16	15	12	6	5			12	17							106
15	(Switzerland) Christof von Grünigen															10	7	7	3	5	4	92
16	(United Kingdom) Josh Hill											6	Ret	4	Ret	6	6	**Ret**	7	Ret	5	92
17	(Germany) Sebastian von Gartzen	9	23	14	23	29	15	19	16	15	12					Ret	12	14	14	14	Ret	92
18	(Netherlands) Pieter Schothorst	Ret	12	8	Ret	24	10	10						10	2							91
19	(France) Côme Ledogar	Ret	11	19	Ret	10	7	6						8	3							91
20	(Israel) Rafael Danieli	Ret	Ret	Ret	24	34	Ret	18	14	14	16	14	13	19	16	18	20	11	12	15	18	86
21	(Netherlands) Meindert van Buuren	10	22	17	20	Ret	14	20	10	20	10	17	12	18	9	Ret	Ret	Ret				85
22	(Netherlands) Frank Suntjens	11	17	Ret	21	28	Ret	21	17	18	13	15	14	13	19	Ret	Ret	15	Ret	12	Ret	85
23	(Colombia) Óscar Andrés Tunjo	Ret	5	10	Ret	Ret	3	5														63
24	(Sweden) Victor Bouveng				27	33	17	16	15	16	Ret	16	Ret	16	12	Ret	9	17				63
25	(France) Norman Nato	Ret	Ret	6	Ret	Ret	4	**2**														56
26	(Cyprus) Tio Ellinas											**1**	4									47
27	(Thailand) Sandy Stuvik	16	9	Ret	25	13																39
28	(Denmark) Johan Jokinen																		8	8	13	34
29	(Finland) Oskari Kurki-Suonio															13	Ret	Ret	10	13	14	34
30	(Sweden) Kevin Kleveros				12	11			6	5	**Ret**											31
31	(France) Mathieu Jaminet				Ret	22			5	10	Ret											27
32	(United Kingdom) Jack Hawksworth																		Ret	9	7	26
33	(United Kingdom) Oscar King											7	10									25
34	(Switzerland) Mauro Calamia															8	Ret	9				25
35	(United Kingdom) Alice Powell											10	8									24
36	(Australia) Jordan Oon																		13	11	16	23
37	(Sweden) Ronnie Lundströmer								13	13	14											23
38	(United States) Robert Siska	15	21	Ret					19	19	Ret	18	17	21	Ret				Ret	Ret	19	19
39	(Slovakia) Richard Gonda				29	31	19	23								11	15	Ret				18
40	(Estonia) Johannes Moor	Ret	13	Ret	Ret	26																18
41	(Sweden) Robert Myrsäter	13	18	15																		17
42	(Estonia) Martin Rump															12	14	21				16
43	(France) Remi Kirchdörffer															19	19	20	16	16	20	16
44	(Denmark) Dear Schilling	Ret	15	13																		14
45	(United Kingdom) Howard Fuller													15	13							14
46	(Finland) Mikko Perttala	14	20	16																		13
47	(Switzerland) Thomas Aregger															15	17	19				12
48	(Switzerland) Kurt Böhlen															17	18	18				10
49	(Finland) Harri Salminen	Ret	19	Ret	30	32																10
50	(India) Zaamin Jaffer													20	14							8
51	(United Kingdom) Sean Walkinshaw													22	18							3
Guest drivers ineligible for points
	(United Kingdom) Will Stevens				2	2																0
	(France) Yann Zimmer				6	4																0
	(Finland) Miki Weckström				5	35																0
	(Puerto Rico) Félix Serrallés				7	6																0
	(Spain) Javier Tarancón				10	7																0
	(Spain) Alex Riberas				8	8																0
	(France) Paul-Loup Chatin				11	9																0
	(Brazil) Henrique Martins				16	12																0
	(Austria) Thomas Jäger				19	15																0
	(Sweden) Timmy Hansen				36	16																0
	(United States) Gustavo Menezes				32	19																0
	(Italy) Vittorio Ghirelli				Ret	20																0
	(Malaysia) Fahmi Ilyas				33	21																0
	(Italy) Edolo Ghirelli				Ret	23																0
	(Russia) Denis Nagulin				28	Ret																0
	(France) Grégoire Demoustier				31	DNS																0
	(France) Florian Le Roux				Ret	Ret																0
	(Russia) Roman Mavlanov				DNS	Ret																0
Pos	Driver	HOC (Germany)			SPA (Belgium)		NÜR (Germany)		ASS (Netherlands)			OSC (Germany)		ZAN (Netherlands)		MST (Czech Republic)			MNZ (Italy)			Points

Colour	Result
Gold	Winner
Silver	Second place
Bronze	Third place
Green	Points classification
Blue	Non-points classification
Blue	Non-classified finish (NC)
Purple	Retired, not classified (Ret)
Red	Did not qualify (DNQ)
Red	Did not pre-qualify (DNPQ)
Black	Disqualified (DSQ)
White	Did not start (DNS)
White	Withdrew (WD)
White	Race cancelled (C)
Blank	Did not practice (DNP)
Blank	Did not arrive (DNA)
Blank	Excluded (EX)

**Bold** – Pole
Italics – Fastest Lap

=== Teams' Championship ===
- Championship points were awarded on a 30, 24, 20, 17, 16, 15, 14, 13, 12, 11, 10, 9, 8, 7, 6, 5, 4, 3, 2, 1 to the top 20 classified finishers in each race.

Pos	Team	HOC (Germany)			SPA (Belgium)		NÜR (Germany)		ASS (Netherlands)			OSC (Germany)		ZAN (Netherlands)		MST (Czech Republic)			MNZ (Italy)			Points
1	(Finland) Koiranen bros.	1	1	1	1	1	1	1	1	2	1	3	1	1	1	1	1	1	1	1	1	584
2	(Belgium) KTR	4	4	2	15	30	6	3	8	3	5	2	2	3	4	3	6	8	6	4	2	355
3	(Netherlands) MP Motorsport	12	13	18	13	26	9	13	6	5	15	8	6	7	5	4	3	4	2	3	3	264
4	(Germany) SL Formula Racing	9	8	14	9	29	5	7	3	4	3	4	8	9	11	21	4	10	4	14	15	253
5	(Germany) Josef Kaufmann Racing	2	2	3	3	5	2	4	2	1	4			Ret	7							238
6	(Netherlands) Van Amersfoort Racing	7	16	17	18	18	14	20	7	11	7	9	7	11	9	9	13	6	9	9	7	215
7	(Finland) Koiranen Junior	6	10	4	26	25	13	12	18	9	9	11	11	6	Ret	12	14	11	12	11	16	188
8	(Poland) Inter Europol Competition	8	Ret	7	22	17	Ret	14	11	Ret	8	19	15	14	15	16	19	13	16	16	17	130
9	(France) R-ace GP	Ret	11	6	Ret	10	4	2						8	2							120
10	(Denmark) KEO Racing	16	9	13	25	13			13	13	14	18	17	21	Ret				8	8	13	112
11	(Belgium) Speedlover	11	17	Ret	21	28	Ret	18	14	14	13	14	13	13	16	Ret	Ret	15	Ret	12	Ret	100
12	(Switzerland) Daltec Racing															8	7	7	3	5	4	94
13	(Sweden) Trackstar				27	33	17	16	15	16	Ret	16	Ret	16	12	Ret	9	17				63
14	(Finland) P1 Motorsport	14	19	16	30	32										13	Ret	Ret	10	13	14	56
15	(United Kingdom) Atech Reid GP											1	4									47
16	(Czech Republic) Krenek Motorsport				29	31	19	23								11	15	Ret				18
17	(Estonia) Scuderia Nordica	13	18	15																		17
18	(United Kingdom) Hillspeed													15	13							14
19	(Switzerland) Böhlen Motorsport															15	17	18				13
Guest drivers ineligible for points
	(United Kingdom) Fortec Motorsport				2	2																0
	(France) ARTA Engineering				6	4																0
	(France) Tech 1 Racing				5	7																0
	(Spain) EPIC Racing				8	8																0
	(Italy) Cram Competition				16	12																0
	(Austria) Interwetten.com Racing Junior Team				19	15																0
	(Italy) One Racing				Ret	20																0
	(France) Boetti Racing Team				DNS	Ret																0
Pos	Team	HOC (Germany)			SPA (Belgium)		NÜR (Germany)		ASS (Netherlands)			OSC (Germany)		ZAN (Netherlands)		MST (Czech Republic)			MNZ (Italy)			Points

Colour	Result
Gold	Winner
Silver	Second place
Bronze	Third place
Green	Points classification
Blue	Non-points classification
Blue	Non-classified finish (NC)
Purple	Retired, not classified (Ret)
Red	Did not qualify (DNQ)
Red	Did not pre-qualify (DNPQ)
Black	Disqualified (DSQ)
White	Did not start (DNS)
White	Withdrew (WD)
White	Race cancelled (C)
Blank	Did not practice (DNP)
Blank	Did not arrive (DNA)
Blank	Excluded (EX)
