= 2011 Formula Renault 2.0 Alps Series =

Motor racing competition

The 2011 Formula Renault 2.0 Alps Series was the first year of the Formula Renault 2.0 Alps series, and the tenth season of the former Swiss Formula Renault Championship. The championship began on 26 March at Monza and finished on 2 October at Spa after fourteen races held at seven meetings.

== Drivers and teams ==
2011 Entry List
Team	No.	Driver name	Rounds
(Italy) Viola Formula Racing	0	(Italy) Federico Gibbin	All
(Italy) Viola Formula Racing	8	(Italy) Francesco Frisone	5
(Italy) Viola Formula Racing	27	(Italy) Giada De Zen	All
(France) Tech 1 Racing	1	(Spain) Javier Tarancón	All
(France) Tech 1 Racing	2	(France) Paul-Loup Chatin	All
(France) Tech 1 Racing	3	(France) Grégoire Demoustier	1, 3–4
(France) Tech 1 Racing	4	(Finland) Miki Weckström	1
(France) Tech 1 Racing	13	(Italy) Cristiano Marcellan	2–7
(Austria) Interwetten.com Junior Team	5	(Sweden) Timmy Hansen	4, 7
(Austria) Interwetten.com Junior Team	14	(Austria) Thomas Jäger	1–3
(Austria) Interwetten.com Junior Team	16	(United States) Gustavo Menezes	2, 5, 7
(France) ARTA Engineering	6	(France) Amir Mesny	1–5, 7
(France) ARTA Engineering	10	(United Kingdom) Melville McKee	All
(France) ARTA Engineering	11	(France) Yann Zimmer	All
(France) ARTA Engineering	25	(France) Alexandre Cougnaud	All
(Switzerland) Daltec Racing	9	(Switzerland) Mauro Calamia	All
(Switzerland) Daltec Racing	12	(Italy) Nicolò Rocca	1–4, 6
(Switzerland) Daltec Racing	29	(Switzerland) Christof von Grünigen	All
(Italy) GSK Motorsport	13	(Italy) Cristiano Marcellan	1
(Spain) EPIC Racing	14	(Austria) Thomas Jäger	4–5
(Spain) EPIC Racing	15	(Spain) Alex Riberas	4, 7
(Italy) Team Torino Motorsport	19	(Italy) Kevin Gilardoni	All
(Italy) Team Torino Motorsport	21	(Italy) Stefano Colombo	All
(Italy) Team Torino Motorsport	22	(Italy) Patrick Gobbo	4
(Italy) Cram Competition	23	(Brazil) Henrique Martins	5
(Italy) One Racing	24	(Italy) Vittorio Ghirelli	1, 4–7
(Italy) One Racing	32	(Italy) Edolo Ghirelli	All
(France) Boëtti Racing Team	26	(Russia) Roman Mavlanov	All

== Race calendar and results ==
Round		Circuit	Date	Pole position	Fastest lap	Winning driver	Winning team	Junior's winner
1	R1	(Italy) Autodromo Nazionale Monza	26 March	(Spain) Javier Tarancón	(Italy) Federico Gibbin	(Italy) Federico Gibbin	(Italy) Viola Formula Racing	(Austria) Thomas Jäger
1	R2	(Italy) Autodromo Nazionale Monza	27 March	(Spain) Javier Tarancón	(Spain) Javier Tarancón	(France) Yann Zimmer	(France) ARTA Engineering	(United Kingdom) Melville McKee
2	R1	(Italy) Autodromo Enzo e Dino Ferrari, Imola	7 May	(United Kingdom) Melville McKee	(Spain) Javier Tarancón	(United Kingdom) Melville McKee	(France) ARTA Engineering	(United Kingdom) Melville McKee
2	R2	(Italy) Autodromo Enzo e Dino Ferrari, Imola	8 May	(United Kingdom) Melville McKee	(Spain) Javier Tarancón	(United Kingdom) Melville McKee	(France) ARTA Engineering	(United Kingdom) Melville McKee
3	R1	(France) Pau Circuit	21 May	(Spain) Javier Tarancón	(Spain) Javier Tarancón	(Spain) Javier Tarancón	(France) Tech 1 Racing	(United Kingdom) Melville McKee
3	R2	(France) Pau Circuit	22 May	(Spain) Javier Tarancón	(Spain) Javier Tarancón	(Spain) Javier Tarancón	(France) Tech 1 Racing	(Italy) Cristiano Marcellan
4	R1	(Austria) Red Bull Ring, Spielberg	11 June	(United Kingdom) Melville McKee	(United Kingdom) Melville McKee	(United Kingdom) Melville McKee	(France) ARTA Engineering	(United Kingdom) Melville McKee
4	R2	(Austria) Red Bull Ring, Spielberg	12 June	(United Kingdom) Melville McKee	(Spain) Alex Riberas	(Sweden) Timmy Hansen	(Austria) Interwetten.com Junior Team	(Italy) Cristiano Marcellan
5	R1	(Hungary) Hungaroring	2 July	(Spain) Javier Tarancón	(France) Paul-Loup Chatin	(Spain) Javier Tarancón	(France) Tech 1 Racing	(Italy) Vittorio Ghirelli
5	R2	(Hungary) Hungaroring	3 July	(Spain) Javier Tarancón	(France) Paul-Loup Chatin	(France) Paul-Loup Chatin	(France) Tech 1 Racing	(United Kingdom) Melville McKee
6	R1	(France) Circuit Paul Ricard, Le Castellet	17 September	(France) Paul-Loup Chatin	(Spain) Javier Tarancón	(France) Paul-Loup Chatin	(France) Tech 1 Racing	(Italy) Vittorio Ghirelli
6	R2	(France) Circuit Paul Ricard, Le Castellet	18 September	(France) Paul-Loup Chatin	(France) Paul-Loup Chatin	(France) Paul-Loup Chatin	(France) Tech 1 Racing	(Italy) Vittorio Ghirelli
7	R1	(Belgium) Circuit de Spa-Francorchamps	1 October	(Sweden) Timmy Hansen	(Sweden) Timmy Hansen	(Spain) Alex Riberas	(Spain) EPIC Racing	(Spain) Alex Riberas
7	R2	(Belgium) Circuit de Spa-Francorchamps	2 October	(Sweden) Timmy Hansen	(Spain) Alex Riberas	(Spain) Alex Riberas	(Spain) EPIC Racing	(Spain) Alex Riberas

== Championship standings ==
=== Drivers' Championship ===
Pos	Driver	MNZ (Italy)		IMO (Italy)		PAU (France)		RBR (Austria)		HUN (Hungary)		LEC (France)		SPA (Belgium)		Points
1	(Spain) Javier Tarancón	8	9	2	2	1	1	Ret	4	1	2	2	3	6	4	344
2	(France) Yann Zimmer	4	1	5	3	2	4	3	2	5	4	4	4	2	3	338
3	(France) Paul-Loup Chatin	2	14	3	6	3	2	2	3	4	1	1	1	17	5	326
4	(United Kingdom) Melville McKee	15	4	1	1	4	9	1	19	14	3	Ret	8	7	10	229
5	(Italy) Stefano Colombo	5	5	12	Ret	14	5	8	6	8	13	9	11	9	14	154
6	(Italy) Kevin Gilardoni	7	11	10	9	15	3	6	5	Ret	7	Ret	12	11	9	153
7	(Austria) Thomas Jäger	3	6	4	4	5	Ret	9	18	6	8					150
8	(Switzerland) Christof von Grünigen	Ret	2	11	11	6	Ret	Ret	DNS	15	6	7	9	4	Ret	133
9	(Italy) Vittorio Ghirelli	9	16					20	8	3	9	3	2	DNS	8	128
10	(Switzerland) Mauro Calamia	10	8	8	12	13	Ret	15	10	13	12	8	10	8	7	125
11	(Italy) Federico Gibbin	1	Ret	9	7	Ret	Ret	7	13	18	11	10	5	13	Ret	124
12	(Italy) Cristiano Marcellan	13	15	6	5	7	6	11	7	7	16					117
13	(Russia) Roman Mavlanov	17	7	7	Ret	8	7	10	11	16	10	5	13	15	Ret	115
14	(Italy) Edolo Ghirelli	Ret	Ret	18	10	12	12	17	9	9	18	6	6	3	Ret	106
15	(Spain) Alex Riberas							5	17					1	1	88
16	(Sweden) Timmy Hansen							4	1					16	2	88
17	(France) Alexandre Cougnaud	16	10	15	Ret	10	8	16	12	11	19	12	13	10	11	79
18	(United States) Gustavo Menezes			13	8					10	14			5	6	68
19	(Italy) Giada De Zen	6	Ret	14	Ret	11	Ret	12	Ret	12	20	13	15	12	13	55
20	(Brazil) Henrique Martins									2	5					48
21	(Italy) Nicolò Rocca	14	13	16	Ret	9	Ret	13	Ret			11	14			32
22	(France) Amir Mesny	12	Ret	17	13	Ret	11	19	14	Ret	15			14	12	29
23	(France) Grégoire Demoustier	11	12			Ret	10	14	16							26
24	(Finland) Miki Weckström	Ret	3													24
25	(Italy) Patrick Gobbo							18	15							1
	(Italy) Francesco Frisone									DNS	DNS					0
Pos	Driver	MNZ (Italy)		IMO (Italy)		PAU (France)		RBR (Austria)		HUN (Hungary)		LEC (France)		SPA (Belgium)		Points

Colour	Result
Gold	Winner
Silver	Second place
Bronze	Third place
Green	Points classification
Blue	Non-points classification
Blue	Non-classified finish (NC)
Purple	Retired, not classified (Ret)
Red	Did not qualify (DNQ)
Red	Did not pre-qualify (DNPQ)
Black	Disqualified (DSQ)
White	Did not start (DNS)
White	Withdrew (WD)
White	Race cancelled (C)
Blank	Did not practice (DNP)
Blank	Did not arrive (DNA)
Blank	Excluded (EX)

=== Junior's Championship ===
Pos	Team	Points
1	(United Kingdom) Melville McKee	344
2	(Russia) Roman Mavlanov	268
3	(Austria) Thomas Jäger	244
4	(Italy) Cristiano Marcellan	240
5	(Italy) Vittorio Ghirelli	228
6	(Italy) Giada De Zen	202
7	(United States) Gustavo Menezes	140
8	(Italy) Nicolò Rocca	140
9	(Spain) Alex Riberas	114

=== Teams' Championship ===
Pos	Team	Points
1	(France) Tech 1 Racing	642
2	(France) Arta Engineering	567
3	(Austria) Interwetten.com Junior Team	262
4	(Switzerland) Daltec Racing	258
5	(Italy) Team Torino Motorsport	237
6	(Italy) One Racing	234
7	(Spain) EPIC Racing	206
8	(Italy) Viola Formula Racing	158
9	(France) Boëtti Racing Team	115
10	(Italy) Cram Competition	48
11	(Italy) GSK Motorsport	5
