= Formula Renault 2.0 Alps =

Former Single-Seater Racing Championship

- Category: Formula Renault 2.0
- Country: Europe
- Inaugural season: 2002
- Folded: 2015
- Constructors: Tatuus
- Engine suppliers: Renault
- Tyre suppliers: Michelin
- Last Drivers' champion: (United Kingdom) Jack Aitken
- Last Teams' champion: (Finland) Koiranen GP
- Official website: renaultsportitalia.it

Formula Renault 2.0 Alps was a category of Formula Renault open-wheel racing, created by the merging of the Formula Renault 2.0 Middle European Championship (formerly known as Formula Renault 2.0 Switzerland) and Formula Renault 2.0 Italia.

== Overview ==
With circuit racing forbidden in Switzerland, the championship is held in bordering countries like France (Dijon, Magny-Cours, Pau), Germany (Hockenheim), Italy (Imola, Monza, Mugello, Misano) and Austria (Salzburg, Red Bull Ring).
However, in recent years, the championship has visited further countries like Belgium (Spa-Francorchamps) and Spain (Jerez, Barcelona).

=== Circuits of Formula Renault 2.0 Alps ===
- (Spain) Circuit de Barcelona-Catalunya (2012)
- (France) Circuit de Pau-Ville (2011–2012, 2014–2015)
- (Belgium) Circuit de Spa-Francorchamps (2011–2015)
- (France) Circuit Paul Ricard (2011)
- (Spain) Circuito de Jerez (2014–2015)
- (Hungary) Hungaroring (2011)
- (Italy) Imola Circuit (2011–2015)
- (Italy) Misano World Circuit Marco Simoncelli (2013, 2015)
- (Italy) Monza Circuit (2011–2015)
- (Italy) Mugello Circuit (2012–2014)
- (Austria) Red Bull Ring (2011–2012, 2014–2015)
- (Italy) Vallelunga Circuit (2013)

The cars use Tatuus chassis and the 2.0 L Renault Clio engines like other Formula Renault 2.0 series. Michelin is the tyres supplier.

== Current point system ==
Points are awarded as following :

Position	1st	2nd	3rd	4th	5th	6th	7th	8th	9th	10th
Points	25	18	15	12	10	8	6	4	2	1

In each race, one bonus point is given for pole position and one point for fastest lap. Only classified drivers are awarded points for finish position.

== Champions ==
=== Formula Renault 2.0 Switzerland/Middle Europe ===
Renault Speed Trophy F2000
Season	Champion	Team Champion
2002	(Germany) Thomas Conrad	no data
2003	(Switzerland) Manuel Benz	no data
2004	(Switzerland) Nicolas Maulini	(Switzerland) Iris Racing

Formule Renault 2.0 Suisse
Season	Champion	Team Champion
2005	(Switzerland) Ralph Meichtry	(Switzerland) Race Performance
2006	(Switzerland) Jonathan Hirschi	(Switzerland) Chevrons Racing

LO Formule Renault 2.0 Suisse
Season	Champion	Team Champion
2007	(Czech Republic) Adam Kout	(Switzerland) Jenzer Motorsport
2008	(Switzerland) Christopher Zanella	(Switzerland) Jenzer Motorsport
2009	(Switzerland) Nico Müller	(Switzerland) Jenzer Motorsport

Formula Renault 2.0 Middle European Championship
Season	Champion	Team Champion
2010	(Switzerland) Zoël Amberg	(Switzerland) Jenzer Motorsport

=== Formula Renault 2.0 Alps ===
Season	Champion	Team Champion	Junior Champion
2011	(Spain) Javier Tarancón	(France) Tech 1 Racing	(United Kingdom) Melville McKee
2012	(Russia) Daniil Kvyat	(France) Tech 1 Racing	(Finland) Patrick Kujala
2013	(Italy) Antonio Fuoco	(Italy) Prema Powerteam	(Italy) Antonio Fuoco
2014	(Netherlands) Nyck de Vries	(Finland) Koiranen GP	(Monaco) Charles Leclerc
2015	(United Kingdom) Jack Aitken	(Finland) Koiranen GP	(Russia) Matevos Isaakyan
