= 2015 Blancpain GT Series =

2015 sports car racing series

The 2015 Blancpain GT Series season was the second season of the Blancpain GT Series. The season started on 6 April at Nogaro and ended on 11 October in Zandvoort. The season featured twelve rounds, five Blancpain Endurance Series rounds and seven Blancpain Sprint Series rounds.

== Calendar ==
On June 6 2015 it was announced that Circuit Park Zandvoort would replace Baku as the final round of the season due to economic reasons.

| Event | Circuit | Date | Series | Report |
|---|---|---|---|---|
| 1 | Circuit Paul Armagnac, Nogaro, France | 6 April | Sprint | Report |
| 2 | Autodromo Nazionale Monza, Monza, Italy | 12 April | Endurance | Report |
| 3 | (United Kingdom) Brands Hatch, Kent, Great Britain | 10 May | Sprint | Report |
| 4 | Silverstone Circuit, Silverstone United Kingdom | 24 May | Endurance | Report |
| 5 | Circuit Zolder, Heusden-Zolder, Belgium | 7 June | Sprint | Report |
| 6 | Circuit Paul Ricard, Le Castellet, France | 20 June | Endurance | Report |
| 7 | Moscow Raceway, Volokolamsk, Russia | 4 July | Sprint | Report |
| 8 | Circuit de Spa-Francorchamps, Stavelot, Belgium | 25–26 July | Endurance | Report |
| 9 | Algarve International Circuit, Algarve, Portugal | 6 September | Sprint | Report |
| 10 | Nürburgring, Nürburg, Germany | 20 September | Endurance | Report |
| 11 | Misano World Circuit Marco Simoncelli, Misano, Italy | 4 October | Sprint | Report |
| 12 | Circuit Park Zandvoort, North Holland, Netherlands | 11 October | Sprint | Report |

== Race results ==
| Event | | Circuit | Series | Pole position | Race winner |
|---|---|---|---|---|---|
| 1 | QR | (France) Nogaro | BSS | (Belgium) No. 3 Belgian Audi Club Team WRT | (Belgium) No. 3 Belgian Audi Club Team WRT |
| 1 | QR | (France) Nogaro | BSS | (Monaco) Stéphane Ortelli (Monaco) Stéphane Richelmi | (Monaco) Stéphane Ortelli (Monaco) Stéphane Richelmi |
| 1 | CR | (France) Nogaro | BSS | (Belgium) No. 3 Belgian Audi Club Team WRT | (Brazil) No. 77 BMW Sports Trophy Team Brasil |
| 1 | CR | (France) Nogaro | BSS | (Monaco) Stéphane Ortelli (Monaco) Stéphane Richelmi | (Belgium) Maxime Martin (Germany) Dirk Müller |
| 2 | | (Italy) Monza | BES | (Germany) No. 333 Rinaldi Racing | (Austria) No. 19 Grasser Racing Team |
| 2 | | (Italy) Monza | BES | (Russia) Rinat Salikhov (Austria) Norbert Siedler | (Italy) Fabio Babini (Netherlands) Jeroen Mul (United States) Andrew Palmer |
| 3 | QR | (United Kingdom) Brands Hatch | BSS | (Belgium) No. 1 Belgian Audi Club Team WRT | (Belgium) No. 1 Belgian Audi Club Team WRT |
| 3 | QR | (United Kingdom) Brands Hatch | BSS | (Netherlands) Robin Frijns (Belgium) Laurens Vanthoor | (Netherlands) Robin Frijns (Belgium) Laurens Vanthoor |
| 3 | CR | (United Kingdom) Brands Hatch | BSS | (Belgium) No. 1 Belgian Audi Club Team WRT | (Belgium) No. 1 Belgian Audi Club Team WRT |
| 3 | CR | (United Kingdom) Brands Hatch | BSS | (Netherlands) Robin Frijns (Belgium) Laurens Vanthoor | (Netherlands) Robin Frijns (Belgium) Laurens Vanthoor |
| 4 | | (United Kingdom) Silverstone | BES | (United Kingdom) No. 23 Nissan GT Academy Team RJN | (New Zealand) No. 58 Von Ryan Racing |
| 4 | | (United Kingdom) Silverstone | BES | (United Kingdom) Alex Buncombe (Japan) Katsumasa Chiyo (Belgium) Wolfgang Reip | (United Kingdom) Rob Bell (France) Kévin Estre (New Zealand) Shane van Gisbergen |
| 5 | QR | (Belgium) Zolder | BSS | (Belgium) No. 1 Belgian Audi Club Team WRT | (Belgium) No. 1 Belgian Audi Club Team WRT |
| 5 | QR | (Belgium) Zolder | BSS | (Netherlands) Robin Frijns (Belgium) Laurens Vanthoor | (Netherlands) Robin Frijns (Belgium) Laurens Vanthoor |
| 5 | CR | (Belgium) Zolder | BSS | (Belgium) No. 1 Belgian Audi Club Team WRT | (Belgium) No. 1 Belgian Audi Club Team WRT |
| 5 | CR | (Belgium) Zolder | BSS | (Netherlands) Robin Frijns (Belgium) Laurens Vanthoor | (Netherlands) Robin Frijns (Belgium) Laurens Vanthoor |
| 6 | | (France) Le Castellet | BES | (Austria) No. 63 Grasser Racing Team | (United Kingdom) No. 23 Nissan GT Academy Team RJN |
| 6 | | (France) Le Castellet | BES | (Italy) Mirko Bortolotti (Italy) Giovanni Venturini (South Africa) Adrian Zaugg | (United Kingdom) Alex Buncombe (Japan) Katsumasa Chiyo (Belgium) Wolfgang Reip |
| 7 | QR | (Russia) Moscow | BSS | (Germany) No. 88 Reiter Engineering | (Germany) No. 88 Reiter Engineering |
| 7 | QR | (Russia) Moscow | BSS | (Netherlands) Nick Catsburg (Germany) Albert von Thurn und Taxis | (Netherlands) Nick Catsburg (Germany) Albert von Thurn und Taxis |
| 7 | CR | (Russia) Moscow | BSS | (Germany) No. 88 Reiter Engineering | (Germany) No. 84 Bentley Team HTP |
| 7 | CR | (Russia) Moscow | BSS | (Netherlands) Nick Catsburg (Germany) Albert von Thurn und Taxis | (France) Vincent Abril (Germany) Maximilian Buhk |
| 8 | | (Belgium) Spa-Francorchamps | BES | (Belgium) No. 2 Audi Sport Team WRT | (Belgium) No. 46 BMW Sports Trophy Team Marc VDS |
| 8 | | (Belgium) Spa-Francorchamps | BES | (Switzerland) Nico Müller (Monaco) Stéphane Ortelli (Germany) Frank Stippler | (Netherlands) Nick Catsburg (Germany) Lucas Luhr (Finland) Markus Palttala |
| 9 | QR | (Portugal) Algarve | BSS | (Belgium) No. 2 Audi Sport Team WRT | (Germany) No. 84 Bentley Team HTP |
| 9 | QR | (Portugal) Algarve | BSS | (Belgium) Enzo Ide (Germany) Christopher Mies | (France) Vincent Abril (Germany) Maximilian Buhk |
| 9 | CR | (Portugal) Algarve | BSS | (Germany) No. 84 Bentley Team HTP | (Belgium) No. 1 Audi Sport Team WRT |
| 9 | CR | (Portugal) Algarve | BSS | (France) Vincent Abril (Germany) Maximilian Buhk | (Netherlands) Robin Frijns (Belgium) Laurens Vanthoor |
| 10 | | (Germany) Nürburgring | BES | (Austria) No. 63 Grasser Racing Team | (New Zealand) No. 58 Von Ryan Racing |
| 10 | | (Germany) Nürburgring | BES | (Italy) Mirko Bortolotti (Italy) Giovanni Venturini (South Africa) Adrian Zaugg | (United Kingdom) Rob Bell (France) Kévin Estre (New Zealand) Shane van Gisbergen |
| 11 | QR | (Italy) Misano | BSS | (Germany) No. 333 Rinaldi Racing | (Germany) No. 333 Rinaldi Racing |
| 11 | QR | (Italy) Misano | BSS | (Germany) Marco Seefried (Austria) Norbert Siedler | (Germany) Marco Seefried (Austria) Norbert Siedler |
| 11 | CR | (Italy) Misano | BSS | (Germany) No. 333 Rinaldi Racing | (Germany) No. 333 Rinaldi Racing |
| 11 | CR | (Italy) Misano | BSS | (Germany) Marco Seefried (Austria) Norbert Siedler | (Germany) Marco Seefried (Austria) Norbert Siedler |
| 12 | QR | (Netherlands) Zandvoort | BSS | (Germany) No. 84 Bentley Team HTP | (Germany) No. 84 Bentley Team HTP |
| 12 | QR | (Netherlands) Zandvoort | BSS | (France) Vincent Abril (Germany) Maximilian Buhk | (France) Vincent Abril (Germany) Maximilian Buhk |
| 12 | CR | (Netherlands) Zandvoort | BSS | (Germany) No. 84 Bentley Team HTP | (Germany) No. 84 Bentley Team HTP |
| 12 | CR | (Netherlands) Zandvoort | BSS | (France) Vincent Abril (Germany) Maximilian Buhk | (France) Vincent Abril (Germany) Maximilian Buhk |

== Championship standings ==
Scoring system

Championship points were awarded for the first six positions in each Qualifying Race and for the first ten positions in each Championship Race. Entries were required to complete 75% of the winning car's race distance in order to be classified and earn points. Individual drivers were required to participate for a minimum of 25 minutes in order to earn championship points in any race. There were no points awarded for the Pole Position.

Qualifying Race points

| Position | **1st** | **2nd** | **3rd** | **4th** | **5th** | **6th** |
| Points | 8 | 6 | 4 | 3 | 2 | 1 |

Championship Race points

| Position | **1st** | **2nd** | **3rd** | **4th** | **5th** | **6th** | **7th** | **8th** | **9th** | **10th** |
| Points | 25 | 18 | 15 | 12 | 10 | 8 | 6 | 4 | 2 | 1 |

1000 km Paul Ricard points

| Position | **1st** | **2nd** | **3rd** | **4th** | **5th** | **6th** | **7th** | **8th** | **9th** | **10th** |
| Points | 33 | 24 | 19 | 15 | 12 | 9 | 6 | 4 | 2 | 1 |

24 Hours of Spa points

Points were awarded after six hours, after twelve hours and at the finish.

| Position | **1st** | **2nd** | **3rd** | **4th** | **5th** | **6th** | **7th** | **8th** | **9th** | **10th** |
| Points after 6hrs/12hrs | 12 | 9 | 7 | 6 | 5 | 4 | 3 | 2 | 1 | 0 |
| Points at the finish | 25 | 18 | 15 | 12 | 10 | 8 | 6 | 4 | 2 | 1 |

=== Drivers' Championship ===
(key) Bold – Pole position Italics – Fastest lap

| Pos. | Driver | Team | NOG (France) | | MNZ (Italy) | BRH (United Kingdom) | | SIL (United Kingdom) | ZOL (Belgium) | | LEC (France) | MSC (Russia) | | SPA (Belgium) | | | ALG (Portugal) | | NÜR (Germany) | MIS (Italy) | | ZAN (Netherlands) | | Total |
| Pos. | Driver | Team | QR | CR | CR | QR | CR | CR | QR | CR | CR | QR | CR | 6hrs | 12hrs | 24hrs | QR | CR | CR | QR | CR | QR | CR | Total |
|---|---|---|---|---|---|---|---|---|---|---|---|---|---|---|---|---|---|---|---|---|---|---|---|---|
| 1 | (Netherlands) Robin Frijns | (Belgium) Belgian Audi Club Team WRT (Note: Entered as Audi Sport Team WRT with cars No. 2 at Monza and Nürburgring, No. 1 at Le Castellet and No. 1 and 2 at Spa.) | DNS | DNS | 3 | **1** | 1 | 2 | **1** | 1 | 34 | Ret | 5 | 50 | 43 | Ret | 2 | 1 | 4 | Ret | DNS | 15 | 2 | 170 |
| 2 | (Germany) Maximilian Buhk | (Germany) Bentley Team HTP | 8 | 4 | | DNS | DNS | | 3 | 2 | | 3 | 1 | | | | 1 | 4 | | 7 | 2 | **1** | 1 | 158 |
| 2 | (Germany) Maximilian Buhk | (United Kingdom) Bentley M-Sport | | | 13 | | | 6 | | | 12 | | | 10 | 4 | Ret | | | 5 | | | | | 158 |
| 3 | (Belgium) Laurens Vanthoor | (Belgium) Belgian Audi Club Team WRT | DNS | DNS | 3 | **1** | 1 | 2 | **1** | 1 | 30 | Ret | 5 | 28 | 21 | 21 | 2 | 1 | 4 | Ret | DNS | | | 152 |
| 4 | (France) Vincent Abril | (Germany) Bentley Team HTP | 8 | 4 | 46 | DNS | DNS | Ret | 3 | 2 | 36 | 3 | 1 | 32 | 16 | 9 | 1 | 4 | Ret | 7 | 2 | **1** | 1 | 136 |
| 5 | (Monaco) Stéphane Ortelli | (Belgium) Belgian Audi Club Team WRT | **1** | 2 | 6 | 11 | 7 | 3 | Ret | 10 | 37 | 9 | 4 | **9** | 2 | 2 | 15 | 5 | 11 | 5 | 7 | 5 | 5 | 126 |
| 6 | (Austria) Norbert Siedler | (Germany) Rinaldi Racing | 4 | 5 | 2 | 10 | Ret | 7 | 2 | Ret | Ret | 2 | 3 | 37 | 27 | 24 | 4 | 3 | 14 | **1** | 1 | 4 | DNS | 118 |
| 7 | (Germany) Marco Seefried | (Germany) Rinaldi Racing | 4 | 5 | | 10 | Ret | 7 | 2 | Ret | Ret | 2 | 3 | 37 | 27 | 24 | 4 | 3 | | **1** | 1 | | | 97 |
| 8 | (Monaco) Stéphane Richelmi | (Belgium) Belgian Audi Club Team WRT | **1** | 2 | Ret | 11 | 7 | 3 | Ret | 10 | 37 | 9 | 4 | 50 | 43 | Ret | 15 | 5 | 11 | 5 | 7 | 5 | 5 | 90 |
| 9 | (Germany) Christopher Mies | (Belgium) Belgian Audi Club Team WRT | 3 | 3 | Ret | 9 | 14 | | 9 | Ret | | 5 | 7 | | | | **10** | 7 | | 3 | 8 | 15 | 2 | 83 |
| 9 | (Germany) Christopher Mies | (Germany) Phoenix Racing | | | | | | | | | 20 | | | 26 | 9 | 3 | | | | | | | | 83 |
| 9 | (Germany) Christopher Mies | (France) Saintéloc | | | | | | | | | | | | | | | | | 7 | | | | | 83 |
| 10 | (United Kingdom) Rob Bell (France) Kévin Estre | (Germany) Attempto Racing | 12 | 13 | | 5 | 3 | | Ret | Ret | | 6 | 9 | | | | | | | | | | | 76 |
| 10 | (United Kingdom) Rob Bell (France) Kévin Estre | (New Zealand) Von Ryan Racing | | | 16 | | | 1 | | | Ret | | | 6 | 13 | 29 | | | 1 | | | | | 76 |
| 11 | (Brazil) Átila Abreu | (Brazil) BMW Sports Trophy Team Brasil | | | 33 | 2 | 2 | Ret | 5 | 3 | 13 | 7 | 2 | | | | 13 | 13 | 25 | 4 | 4 | 9 | Ret | 74 |
| 11 | (Brazil) Valdeno Brito | (Brazil) BMW Sports Trophy Team Brasil | | | 32 | 2 | 2 | Ret | 5 | 3 | | 7 | 2 | | | | 13 | 13 | Ret | 4 | 4 | 9 | Ret | 74 |
| 12 | (Germany) Frank Stippler | (Belgium) Belgian Audi Club Team WRT | 11 | 6 | 6 | 8 | 9 | 3 | Ret | DNS | 37 | 11 | 8 | **9** | 2 | 2 | 6 | 12 | 11 | 8 | 13 | Ret | Ret | 68 |
| 13 | (Netherlands) Nick Catsburg | (Germany) Reiter Engineering | Ret | 17 | | 7 | 5 | | | | | **1** | Ret | | | | 5 | 6 | | 10 | 9 | 12 | 8 | 64 |
| 13 | (Netherlands) Nick Catsburg | (Belgium) BMW Sports Trophy Team Marc VDS | | | | | | | | | | | | 18 | 5 | 1 | | | | | | | | 64 |
| 13 | (Belgium) Maxime Martin | (Brazil) BMW Sports Trophy Team Brasil | **2** | 1 | | | | | | | | | | | | | | | | | | | | 64 |
| 13 | (Belgium) Maxime Martin | (Belgium) BMW Sports Trophy Team Marc VDS | | | | | | | | | 3 | | | 3 | 3 | 31 | | | | | | | | 64 |
| 14 | (New Zealand) Shane van Gisbergen | (New Zealand) Von Ryan Racing | | | 16 | | | 1 | | | | | | 6 | 13 | 29 | | | 1 | | | | | 54 |
| 14 | (United Kingdom) Steven Kane (United Kingdom) Andy Meyrick (United Kingdom) Guy Smith | (United Kingdom) Bentley M-Sport | | | 5 | | | 9 | | | 2 | | | 21 | 47 | Ret | | | 2 | | | | | 54 |
| 15 | (United Kingdom) Alex Buncombe (Japan) Katsumasa Chiyo (Belgium) Wolfgang Reip | (United Kingdom) Nissan GT Academy Team RJN | | | 8 | | | **13** | | | 1 | | | 25 | 25 | 15 | | | 3 | | | | | 52 |
| 16 | (Germany) Lucas Luhr (Finland) Markus Palttala | (Belgium) BMW Sports Trophy Team Marc VDS | | | | | | | | | 3 | | | 18 | 5 | 1 | | | | | | | | 49 |
| 17 | (Germany) Markus Winkelhock | (Germany) Phoenix Racing | Ret | 8 | 21 | 6 | 8 | 34 | 4 | 5 | 40 | 10^{1} | 6^{1} | | | | 3 | 2 | 30 | 12 | 12 | 3 | Ret | 48 |
| 17 | (Germany) Markus Winkelhock | (Belgium) Belgian Audi Club Team WRT | | | | | | | | | | | | 28 | 21 | 21 | | | | | | | | 48 |
| 17 | (Austria) Nikolaus Mayr-Melnhof | (Germany) Phoenix Racing | Ret | 8 | | 6 | 8 | | 4 | 5 | | WD | WD | | | | 3 | 2 | | 12 | 12 | 3 | Ret | 48 |
| 18 | (Italy) Mirko Bortolotti | (Austria) Grasser Racing Team | | | 25 | | | 8 | | | **6** | | | 5 | 37 | Ret | | | **6** | 2 | 3 | | | 47 |
| 19 | (France) Jean-Karl Vernay | (Belgium) Belgian Audi Club Team WRT | | | 3 | | | 2 | | | 34 | | | 50 | 43 | Ret | | | 4 | | | | | 45 |
| 19 | (United Kingdom) Craig Dolby (United Kingdom) Sean Walkinshaw | (Germany) MRS GT-Racing | Ret | 15 | 12 | 3 | 6 | 5 | 6 | 9 | 42 | 12 | 11 | 53 | 53 | Ret | | | | | | | | 45 |
| 19 | (United Kingdom) Craig Dolby (United Kingdom) Sean Walkinshaw | (United States) Always Evolving Motorsport | | | | | | | | | | | | | | | 14 | 8 | 8 | 9 | 5 | 6 | Ret | 45 |
| 20 | (Belgium) Enzo Ide | (Belgium) Belgian Audi Club Team WRT | 3 | 3 | | 9 | 14 | | 9 | Ret | | 5 | 7 | | | | **10** | 7 | | 3 | 8 | | | 43 |
| 21 | (Brazil) Sérgio Jimenez | (Brazil) BMW Sports Trophy Team Brasil | | | 18 | 4 | 4 | 26 | 7 | 4 | 13 | 4 | Ret | 16 | 34 | 13 | 7 | Ret | 21 | 6 | 6 | 8 | 10 | 40 |
| 21 | (Brazil) Cacá Bueno | (Brazil) BMW Sports Trophy Team Brasil | | | 18 | 4 | 4 | 26 | 7 | 4 | | 4 | Ret | 16 | 34 | 13 | 7 | Ret | 21 | 6 | 6 | 8 | 10 | 40 |
| 21 | (Germany) Nico Bastian (Netherlands) Stef Dusseldorp | (Germany) Rowe Racing | | | 11 | | | 10 | | | 4 | | | 1 | 1 | 16 | | | 19 | | | | | 40 |
| 21 | (Italy) Marco Bonanomi (Czech Republic) Filip Salaquarda | (Czech Republic) ISR | 6 | 7 | 20 | 12 | 11 | 4 | 10 | 7 | 9 | 14 | Ret | 51 | 51 | Ret | 9 | 11 | 12 | 13 | 10 | 11 | 4 | 40 |
| 22 | (Spain) Daniel Juncadella | (Germany) Rowe Racing (Note: Entered as Team Astana by Rowe with car No. 98.) | | | 15 | | | 11 | | | 4 | | | 1 | 1 | 16 | | | 19 | | | | | 39 |
| 23 | (Germany) Albert von Thurn und Taxis | (Germany) Reiter Engineering | Ret | 17 | | 7 | 5 | | 11 | 8 | | **1** | Ret | | | | 5 | 6 | | 10 | 9 | 12 | 8 | 38 |
| 24 | (Denmark) Nicki Thiim | (Germany) Phoenix Racing | | | | | | | | | | | | 26 | 9 | 3 | | | | | | | | 37 |
| 24 | (Denmark) Nicki Thiim | (Belgium) Belgian Audi Club Team WRT | | | | | | | | | | | | | | | | | | | | 2 | 3 | 37 |
| 25 | (Switzerland) Nico Müller | (Belgium) Audi Sport Team WRT | | | 6 | | | | | | 34 | | | **9** | 2 | 2 | | | | | | | | 36 |
| 26 | (Belgium) Frédéric Vervisch | (Czech Republic) ISR | | | 20 | | | 4 | | | 9 | | | 51 | 51 | Ret | | | 12 | | | | | 35 |
| 26 | (Belgium) Frédéric Vervisch | (Belgium) Belgian Audi Club Team WRT | | | | | | | | | | | | | | | | | | | | 2 | 3 | 35 |
| 27 | (Germany) Dirk Müller | (Brazil) BMW Sports Trophy Team Brasil | **2** | 1 | | | | | | | | | | | | | | | | | | | | 31 |
| 27 | (Germany) Dirk Müller | (United Kingdom) Triple Eight Racing | | | | | | | | | | | | 48 | 50 | Ret | | | | | | | | 31 |
| 28 | (Netherlands) Jeroen Mul | (Austria) Grasser Racing Team | | | **1** | | | 17 | | | Ret | | | 7 | 46 | Ret | | | 13 | 16 | DNS | | | 28 |
| 28 | (Italy) Fabio Babini (United States) Andrew Palmer | (Austria) Grasser Racing Team | | | **1** | | | 17 | | | Ret | | | 7 | 46 | Ret | | | 13 | | | | | 28 |
| 29 | (Italy) Giovanni Venturini (South Africa) Adrian Zaugg | (Austria) Grasser Racing Team | | | 25 | | | 8 | | | **6** | | | 5 | 37 | Ret | | | **6** | | | | | 26 |
| 30 | (Russia) Rinat Salikhov | (Germany) Rinaldi Racing | | | 2 | | | 7 | | | Ret | | | 37 | 27 | 24 | | | 14 | | | | | 24 |
| 30 | (Spain) Andy Soucek (Belgium) Maxime Soulet | (United Kingdom) Bentley M-Sport | | | 13 | | | 6 | | | 12 | | | 10 | 4 | Ret | | | 5 | | | | | 24 |
| 31 | (United Kingdom) Duncan Cameron (Republic of Ireland) Matt Griffin | (Italy) AF Corse | | | 4 | | | 18 | | | 10 | | | 8 | 10 | 6 | | | 34 | | | | | 23 |
| 32 | (Italy) Alessandro Pier Guidi | (France) AKKA ASP | | | | | | | | | 7 | | | | | | | | Ret | | | | | 22 |
| 32 | (Italy) Alessandro Pier Guidi | (Italy) AF Corse | | | | | | | | | | | | 11 | 6 | 4 | | | | | | | | 22 |
| 33 | (Finland) Patrick Kujala | (Austria) Grasser Racing Team | | | | | | | | | | | | | | | | | | 2 | 3 | | | 21 |
| 34 | (Italy) Alessandro Bonacini (Poland) Michał Broniszewski (United Kingdom) Michael Lyons | (Switzerland) Kessel Racing | | | 7 | | | 46 | | | 5 | | | 45 | 49 | Ret | | | 18 | | | | | 18 |
| 34 | (Netherlands) Jules Szymkowiak | (Germany) Bentley Team HTP | Ret | 14 | | 13 | 12 | | 8 | 6 | | 8 | 10 | | | | 8 | Ret | | Ret | DNS | 7 | 6 | 18 |
| 35 | (France) Greg Guilvert | (France) Saintéloc | | | 9 | | | 12 | | | 23 | | | 2 | 42 | Ret | | | 7 | | | | | 17 |
| 35 | (United Kingdom) James Nash | (Belgium) Belgian Audi Club Team WRT | 11 | 6 | | 8 | 9 | 43 | Ret | DNS | | 11 | 8 | 22 | 44 | Ret | 6 | 12 | | 8 | 13 | Ret | Ret | 17 |
| 36 | (Germany) Christian Mamerow | (Germany) Phoenix Racing | | | 21 | | | | | | | | | 26 | 9 | 3 | | | | | | | | 16 |
| 36 | (Italy) Gianmaria Bruni (Thailand) Pasin Lathouras (Belgium) Stéphane Lémeret | (Italy) AF Corse | | | | | | | | | | | | 11 | 6 | 4 | | | | | | | | 16 |
| 37 | (Brazil) Augusto Farfus (Germany) Dirk Werner | (Belgium) BMW Sports Trophy Team Marc VDS | | | | | | | | | | | | 3 | 3 | 31 | | | | | | | | 14 |
| 37 | (United Kingdom) Martin Plowman | (Germany) MRS GT-Racing | | | 12 | | | 5 | | | 42 | | | 53 | 53 | Ret | | | | | | | | 14 |
| 37 | (United Kingdom) Martin Plowman | (United States) Always Evolving Motorsport | | | | | | | | | | | | | | | | | 8 | | | | | 14 |
| 38 | (Sweden) Edward Sandström | (France) Saintéloc | | | 9 | | | 12 | | | | | | 2 | 42 | Ret | | | | | | | | 11 |
| 38 | (Portugal) Francisco Guedes | (Italy) AF Corse | | | | | | | | | 10 | | | 8 | 10 | 6 | | | 32 | | | | | 11 |
| 39 | (Switzerland) Marcel Fässler | (Germany) Phoenix Racing | | | | | | | | | 20 | | | 27 | 11 | 5 | | | | | | | | 10 |
| 39 | (Germany) Mike Rockenfeller | (Belgium) Belgian Audi Club Team WRT | | | | | | | | | 30 | | | | | | | | | | | | | 10 |
| 39 | (Germany) Mike Rockenfeller | (Germany) Phoenix Racing | | | | | | | | | | | | 27 | 11 | 5 | | | | | | | | 10 |
| 39 | (Germany) André Lotterer | (Germany) Phoenix Racing | | | | | | | | | | | | 27 | 11 | 5 | | | | | | | | 10 |
| 39 | (Netherlands) Max van Splunteren | (Germany) Bentley Team HTP | | | | | | | | | | 8 | 10 | 19 | 45 | Ret | 8 | Ret | | Ret | DNS | 7 | 6 | 10 |
| 39 | (Italy) Davide Rigon | (Italy) AF Corse | | | | | | | | | | | | 8 | 10 | 6 | | | | | | | | 10 |
| 40 | (Germany) Marc Basseng | (France) Saintéloc | | | | | | 12 | | | | | | 2 | 42 | Ret | | | | | | | | 9 |
| 41 | (Portugal) Álvaro Parente (United Kingdom) Adrian Quaife-Hobbs | (New Zealand) Von Ryan Racing | | | 26 | | | 53 | | | 21 | | | 4 | 8 | 18 | | | 38 | | | | | 8 |
| 41 | (Brazil) Bruno Senna | (New Zealand) Von Ryan Racing | | | 26 | | | | | | 21 | | | 4 | 8 | 18 | | | 38 | | | | | 8 |
| 41 | (France) Tom Dillmann | (Germany) Bentley Team HTP | | | | | | | 8 | 6 | | | | | | | | | | | | | | 8 |
| 41 | (Estonia) Marko Asmer | (Russia) GT Russian Team | | | 17 | Ret | 13 | 24 | 13 | DNS | 11 | 15 | 13 | 17 | 12 | Ret | 11 | 9 | 23 | 15 | 11 | 10 | 7 | 8 |
| 42 | (Russia) Aleksey Karachev | (Russia) GT Russian Team | 5 | 11 | 19 | 14 | 10 | 20 | 12 | 13 | 11 | 13 | 12 | 52 | 52 | Ret | 12 | 10 | 20 | 14 | 15 | 13 | 9 | 7 |
| 43 | (Russia) Roman Mavlanov | (Russia) GT Russian Team | | | | | | | | | | | | | | | | | | | | 10 | 7 | 6 |
| 43 | (United Kingdom) Oliver Bryant (United Kingdom) Alasdair McCaig (United Kingdom) Devon Modell | (United Kingdom) Ecurie Ecosse | | | 34 | | | 31 | | | 39 | | | 23 | 14 | 7 | | | 28 | | | | | 6 |
| 43 | (United Kingdom) Alexander Sims | (United Kingdom) Ecurie Ecosse | | | | | | | | | | | | 23 | 14 | 7 | | | | | | | | 6 |
| 43 | (France) Tristan Vautier | (France) AKKA ASP | | | 23 | | | | | | 7 | | | | | | | | Ret | | | | | 6 |
| 43 | (France) Morgan Moullin Traffort | (France) AKKA ASP | | | Ret | | | 28 | | | 7 | | | | | | | | Ret | | | | | 6 |
| 43 | (Spain) Miguel Molina | (France) Saintéloc | | | | | | | | | | | | | | | | | 7 | | | | | 6 |
| 44 | (Germany) Bernd Schneider | (Russia) GT Russian Team | 5 | 11 | 19 | 14 | 10 | | 12 | 13 | | | | | | | | | | | | | | 4 |
| 44 | (Germany) Bernd Schneider | (Germany) Black Falcon | | | | | | | | | | | | 30 | 35 | Ret | | | | | | | | 4 |
| 44 | (Netherlands) Peter Kox | (Germany) Reiter Engineering | | | | | | | 11 | 8 | | | | | | | | | | | | | | 4 |
| 44 | (Russia) Leo Machitski | Team Russia by Barwell | | | Ret | | | 30 | | | 25 | | | 15 | 20 | 8 | | | 44 | | | | | 4 |
| 44 | (United Kingdom) Jonny Cocker | Team Russia by Barwell | | | Ret | | | 30 | | | | | | 15 | 20 | 8 | | | 44 | | | | | 4 |
| 44 | (United Kingdom) Phil Keen (United Kingdom) Jon Minshaw | Team Russia by Barwell | | | | | | | | | | | | 15 | 20 | 8 | | | | | | | | 4 |
| 44 | (Germany) Maro Engel (United States) Sean Johnston (United Kingdom) Oliver Morley | (Germany) Black Falcon | | | 38 | | | DNS | | | 8 | | | 30 | 35 | Ret | | | 24 | | | | | 4 |
| 44 | (Russia) Aleksey Vasilyev | (Russia) GT Russian Team | 14 | 9 | 17 | Ret | 13 | 24 | 13 | DNS | 11 | 15 | 13 | 17 | 12 | Ret | 11 | 9 | 23 | 15 | 11 | | | 4 |
| 45 | (Netherlands) Jeroen Bleekemolen | (Germany) Rinaldi Racing | | | | | | | | | | | | | | | | | | | | 4 | DNS | 3 |
| 45 | (Germany) Timo Glock (Canada) Bruno Spengler (Italy) Alex Zanardi | (Italy) ROAL Motorsport | | | | | | | | | Ret | | | 13 | 7 | 25 | | | | | | | | 3 |
| 45 | (France) Christophe Bouchut | (Russia) GT Russian Team | 14 | 9 | | | | 20 | | | | 13 | 12 | 52 | 52 | Ret | 12 | 10 | | 14 | 15 | | | 3 |
| 46 | (Netherlands) Indy Dontje | (Germany) Rowe Racing | | | 15 | | | 11 | | | Ret | | | | | | | | | | | | | 2 |
| 46 | (Netherlands) Indy Dontje | (Russia) GT Russian Team | | | | | | | | | | | | 17 | 12 | Ret | | | 20 | | | 13 | 9 | 2 |
| 46 | (France) Mike Parisy (Switzerland) Harold Primat | (Germany) Bentley Team HTP | | | 46 | | | Ret | | | 36 | | | 32 | 16 | 9 | | | Ret | | | | | 2 |
| 46 | (Italy) Edoardo Mortara | (France) Saintéloc | | | 9 | | | | | | 23 | | | | | | | | | | | | | 2 |
| 46 | (Germany) Stefan Mücke | (United Kingdom) Leonard Motorsport AMR | | | | | | | | | | | | 33 | 15 | 10 | | | | | | | | 2 |
| 46 | (Germany) Stefan Mücke | (United Kingdom) Oman Racing Team | | | | | | | | | | | | | | | | | 10 | | | | | 2 |
| 47 | (Germany) Klaus Graf | (Germany) Rowe Racing | | | 11 | | | 10 | | | | | | | | | | | | | | | | 1 |
| 47 | (United Kingdom) Stuart Leonard (United Kingdom) Michael Meadows | (United Kingdom) Leonard Motorsport AMR | | | 30 | | | 14 | | | 26 | | | 33 | 15 | 10 | | | 22 | | | | | 1 |
| 47 | (United Kingdom) Tom Onslow-Cole | (United Kingdom) Leonard Motorsport AMR | | | | | | | | | | | | 33 | 15 | 10 | | | | | | | | 1 |
| 47 | (Oman) Ahmad Al Harthy | (United Kingdom) Oman Racing Team | | | 28 | | | 19 | | | 16 | | | 24 | 17 | 30 | | | 10 | | | | | 1 |
| 47 | (Italy) Marco Cioci (Italy) Piergiuseppe Perazzini | (Italy) AF Corse | | | 10 | | | 51 | | | 38 | | | 54 | 54 | Ret | | | 32 | | | | | 1 |
| 47 | (Venezuela) Enzo Potolicchio | (Italy) AF Corse | | | 10 | | | 51 | | | 38 | | | 54 | 54 | Ret | | | | | | | | 1 |
| 47 | (United Kingdom) Rory Butcher | (United Kingdom) Oman Racing Team | | | | | | | | | | | | | | | | | 10 | | | | | 1 |
| | (Denmark) Anders Fjordbach | (Czech Republic) ISR | 7 | 12 | DNS | 16 | 15 | 55 | 14 | 12 | | | | | | | | | | 11 | 14 | 14 | 11 | 0 |
| | (Denmark) Anders Fjordbach | (Denmark) Insightracing with Flex-Box | | | | | | | | | | | | 34 | 40 | Ret | | | | | | | | 0 |
| | (Denmark) Thomas Fjordbach | (Czech Republic) ISR | 7 | 12 | DNS | 16 | 15 | 55 | 14 | 12 | | | | | | | | | | 11 | 14 | | | 0 |
| | (Austria) Martin Ragginger (Switzerland) Marcel Wagner | (Switzerland) Fach Auto Tech | 10 | 16 | | | | | | | | | | | | | | | | | | | | 0 |
| | (Germany) Philipp Wlazik | (Germany) Attempto Racing | 13 | 18 | | 17 | 17 | | 15 | 11 | | | | 39 | 26 | 17 | | | | | | | | 0 |
| | (Denmark) Michael Markussen | (Czech Republic) ISR | | | | | | | | | | | | | | | | | | | | 14 | 11 | 0 |
| | (France) Nicolas Armindo | (Germany) Attempto Racing | | | 41 | | | Ret | 15 | 11 | | | | | | | | | | | | | | 0 |
| | (Denmark) Nicolai Sylvest | (Germany) Rowe Racing | | | 15 | | | 11 | | | Ret | | | | | | | | | | | | | 0 |
| | (Belgium) Adrien de Leener (Monaco) Cédric Sbirrazzuoli | (Italy) AF Corse | | | 31 | | | 25 | | | 17 | | | 46 | 24 | 11 | | | 17 | | | | | 0 |
| | (Italy) Raffaele Giammaria (Finland) Toni Vilander | (Italy) AF Corse | | | | | | | | | | | | 46 | 24 | 11 | | | | | | | | 0 |
| | (France) Olivier Lombard | (Germany) Bentley Team HTP | Ret | 14 | | 13 | 12 | | | | | | | | | | | | | | | | | 0 |
| | (United Kingdom) Lewis Plato | (Russia) GT Russian Team | | | | | | | | | | | | 17 | 12 | Ret | | | | | | | | 0 |
| | (Brazil) Felipe Fraga | (Brazil) BMW Sports Trophy Team Brasil | | | 18 | | | 26 | | | 13 | | | 16 | 34 | 13 | | | 21 | | | | | 0 |
| | (Japan) Yoshiharu Mori | (Germany) Attempto Racing | 13 | 18 | 48 | | | | | | | | | | | | | | | | | | | 0 |
| | (Denmark) Dennis Andersen (Denmark) Martin Jensen | (Denmark) Insightracing with Flex-Box | | | 14 | | | 39 | | | 14 | | | 34 | 40 | Ret | | | 41 | | | | | 0 |
| | (France) Eric Dermont (France) Henry Hassid (France) Franck Perera | (France) TDS Racing | | | Ret | | | 21 | | | Ret | | | 14 | 18 | Ret | | | 31 | | | | | 0 |
| | (Switzerland) Mathias Beche | (France) TDS Racing | | | | | | | | | | | | 14 | 18 | Ret | | | | | | | | 0 |
| | (United Kingdom) Paul Wilson | (United Kingdom) Leonard Motorsport AMR | | | 30 | | | 14 | | | 26 | | | | | | | | 22 | | | | | 0 |
| | (United Kingdom) Ian Loggie (United Kingdom) Julian Westwood | (United Kingdom) Team Parker Racing | | | 35 | | | 41 | | | Ret | | | 29 | 23 | 14 | | | 43 | | | | | 0 |
| | (Denmark) Benny Simonsen | (United Kingdom) Team Parker Racing | | | | | | | | | Ret | | | 29 | 23 | 14 | | | | | | | | 0 |
| | (United Kingdom) Callum MacLeod | (United Kingdom) Team Parker Racing | | | | | | | | | | | | 29 | 23 | 14 | | | | | | | | 0 |
| | (Russia) Mark Shulzhitskiy | (United Kingdom) Nissan GT Academy Team RJN | | | | | | | | | 35 | Ret | 14 | | | | | | | | | | | 0 |
| | (United States) Nick Hammann | (United Kingdom) Nissan GT Academy Team RJN | | | | | | | | | | Ret | 14 | | | | | | | | | | | 0 |
| | (Germany) Robert Renauer | (Germany) Rinaldi Racing | | | | | | | | | | | | | | | | | 14 | | | | | 0 |
| | (United Kingdom) Lee Mowle (United Kingdom) Joe Osborne | (United Kingdom) Triple Eight Racing | | | 45 | 15 | 16 | 27 | | | Ret | | | 48 | 50 | Ret | | | 29 | | | | | 0 |
| | (Germany) Kenneth Heyer (Spain) Miguel Toril | (Germany) Car Collection Motorsport | | | Ret | | | 29 | | | 18 | | | | | | | | | | | | | 0 |
| | (Germany) Kenneth Heyer (Spain) Miguel Toril | (Russia) GT Russian Team | | | | | | | | | | | | 52 | 52 | Ret | | | | | | | | 0 |
| | (Germany) Kenneth Heyer (Spain) Miguel Toril | (Germany) Rowe Racing | | | | | | | | | | | | | | | | | 15 | | | | | 0 |
| | (Mexico) Ricardo Sánchez | (United Kingdom) Nissan GT Academy Team RJN | | | Ret | | | 15 | | | 35 | | | 36 | 19 | 26 | | | Ret | | | | | 0 |
| | (France) Gaëtan Paletou | (United Kingdom) Nissan GT Academy Team RJN | | | | | | 15 | | | 35 | | | 36 | 19 | 26 | | | Ret | | | | | 0 |
| | (France) Enzo Guibbert (France) Gilles Vannelet | (France) Sport Garage | | | Ret | | | 32 | | | 15 | | | 49 | 39 | 28 | | | 26 | | | | | 0 |
| | (France) Arno Santamato | (France) Sport Garage | | | Ret | | | 32 | | | 15 | | | | | | | | 26 | | | | | 0 |
| | (Ukraine) Sergey Chukanov | (Germany) Attempto Racing | | | | | | | | | Ret | DNS | 15 | | | | | | | | | | | 0 |
| | (Russia) Ivan Samarin | (Germany) Attempto Racing | | | | | | | | | | DNS | 15 | | | | | | | | | | | 0 |
| | (United Kingdom) Jann Mardenborough | (United Kingdom) Nissan GT Academy Team RJN | | | | | | 15 | | | | | | | | | | | | | | | | 0 |
| | (Switzerland) Fredy Barth (Switzerland) Lorenz Frey (Switzerland) Gabriele Gardel | (Switzerland) Emil Frey Racing | | | Ret | | | 16 | | | 43 | | | 20 | 22 | 27 | | | 16 | | | | | 0 |
| | (United Kingdom) Jonathan Adam (United Kingdom) Daniel Lloyd | (United Kingdom) Oman Racing Team | | | 28 | | | 19 | | | 16 | | | 24 | 17 | 30 | | | | | | | | 0 |
| | (Italy) Alberto Di Folco | (Austria) Grasser Racing Team | | | | | | | | | | | | | | | | | | 16 | DNS | | | 0 |
| | (Switzerland) Fabien Thuner | (Germany) Attempto Racing | | | 41 | 17 | 17 | Ret | | | | | | | | | | | | | | | | 0 |
| | (Australia) Jonathan Venter | (United Kingdom) Oman Racing Team | | | | | | | | | | | | 24 | 17 | 30 | | | | | | | | 0 |
| | (Germany) Jürgen Häring (Greece) Dimitrios Konstantinou (Germany) Frank Schmickler | (Germany) Attempto Racing | | | 40 | | | 40 | | | 31 | | | 39 | 26 | 17 | | | 37 | | | | | 0 |
| | (Germany) Jan Seyffarth | (Germany) Car Collection Motorsport | | | | | | 29 | | | 18 | | | | | | | | | | | | | 0 |
| | (France) Sacha Bottemane (Netherlands) Max Koebolt (Netherlands) Pieter Schothorst | (Belgium) Team WRT | | | 36 | | | 22 | | | 19 | | | 22 | 44 | Ret | | | 27 | | | | | 0 |
| | (Germany) Florian Strauss | (United Kingdom) Nissan GT Academy Team RJN | | | Ret | | | | | | | | | 36 | 19 | 26 | | | | | | | | 0 |
| | (France) Olivier Pla | (United Kingdom) Nissan GT Academy Team RJN | | | | | | | | | | | | 36 | 19 | 26 | | | | | | | | 0 |
| | (United States) Stephen Earle (Australia) Liam Talbot (Italy) Marco Zanuttini | (Switzerland) Kessel Racing | | | 24 | | | DNS | | | 44 | | | 41 | 28 | 19 | | | 42 | | | | | 0 |
| | (France) Marc Rostan | (France) Saintéloc | | | | | | 50 | | | | | | | | | | | 48 | | | | | 0 |
| | (France) Marc Rostan | (Switzerland) Kessel Racing | | | | | | | | | | | | 41 | 28 | 19 | | | | | | | | 0 |
| | (Belgium) Louis Machiels (Austria) Clemens Schmid | (Germany) Bentley Team HTP | | | | | | | | | | | | 19 | 45 | Ret | | | | | | | | 0 |
| | (Czech Republic) Dennis Waszek | (Russia) GT Russian Team | | | | | | 20 | | | | | | | | | | | 20 | | | | | 0 |
| | (Germany) Christopher Haase | (Germany) Phoenix Racing | | | 21 | | | | | | 20 | | | | | | | | | | | | | 0 |
| | (Switzerland) Jonathan Hirschi | (France) Classic & Modern Racing | | | | | | | | | Ret | | | | | | | | | | | | | 0 |
| | (Switzerland) Jonathan Hirschi | (Switzerland) Emil Frey Racing | | | | | | | | | | | | 20 | 22 | 27 | | | | | | | | 0 |
| | (France) Jean-Philippe Belloc (France) Christophe Bourret (France) Pascal Gibon (France) Philippe Polette | (France) AKKA ASP | | | | | | | | | | | | 35 | 29 | 20 | | | | | | | | 0 |
| | (Germany) René Rast | (Belgium) Belgian Audi Club Team WRT | | | | | | | | | 30 | | | 28 | 21 | 21 | | | | | | | | 0 |
| | (Germany) Steve Parrow | (Germany) Black PearL by Rinaldi | | | 22 | | | 36 | | | 22 | | | | | | | | 33 | | | | | 0 |
| | (Germany) Pierre Kaffer | (Germany) Black PearL by Rinaldi | | | 22 | | | 36 | | | 22 | | | | | | | | | | | | | 0 |
| | (France) Pierre Etienne Bordet (France) Alexandre Viron | (Belgium) Delahaye Racing Team | | | Ret | | | 47 | | | Ret | | | 43 | 33 | 22 | | | 47 | | | | | 0 |
| | (France) Emmanuel Orgeval | (Belgium) Delahaye Racing Team | | | | | | 47 | | | Ret | | | 43 | 33 | 22 | | | 47 | | | | | 0 |
| | (France) Paul-Loup Chatin | (Belgium) Delahaye Racing Team | | | | | | | | | | | | 43 | 33 | 22 | | | | | | | | 0 |
| | (Germany) Dominik Schwager | (Germany) Black PearL by Rinaldi | | | | | | | | | 22 | | | | | | | | 33 | | | | | 0 |
| | (United Arab Emirates) Karim Al Azhari | (Russia) GT Russian Team | | | | | | 24 | | | | | | | | | | | 23 | | | | | 0 |
| | (France) Tony Samon | (France) Sport Garage | | | | | | 38 | | | | | | 40 | 32 | 23 | | | | | | | | 0 |
| | (France) Christian Beroujon (Belgium) Christoff Corten (France) Marc Guillot | (France) Sport Garage | | | | | | | | | | | | 40 | 32 | 23 | | | | | | | | 0 |
| | (France) Maurice Ricci | (France) AKKA ASP | | | 23 | | | 35 | | | Ret | | | | | | | | 46 | | | | | 0 |
| | (France) Gabriel Balthazard | (France) AKKA ASP | | | 23 | | | | | | | | | | | | | | | | | | | 0 |
| | (France) Adrien Tambay | (France) Saintéloc | | | | | | | | | 23 | | | | | | | | | | | | | 0 |
| | (Belgium) Stef Van Campenhout | (Germany) Rinaldi Racing | | | | | | | | | | | | 37 | 27 | 24 | | | | | | | | 0 |
| | (Russia) Andrey Birzhin (Italy) Fabio Mancini (Italy) Rino Mastronardi | (Switzerland) Glorax Racing | | | 29 | | | 37 | | | 24 | | | | | | | | | | | | | 0 |
| | (Russia) Timur Sardarov | Team Russia by Barwell | | | Ret | | | 30 | | | 25 | | | | | | | | 44 | | | | | 0 |
| | (Brazil) Matheus Stumpf | (Brazil) BMW Sports Trophy Team Brasil | | | | | | Ret | | | | | | | | | | | 25 | | | | | 0 |
| | (France) Fabien Barthez (France) Anthony Pons | (France) AKKA ASP | | | 27 | | | Ret | | | 28 | | | | | | | | 35 | | | | | 0 |
| | (United Kingdom) Ryan Ratcliffe | (United Kingdom) Triple Eight Racing | | | 45 | | | 27 | | | Ret | | | 48 | 50 | Ret | | | 29 | | | | | 0 |
| | (Luxembourg) Olivier Grotz (Saudi Arabia) Karim Ojjeh | (Belgium) Boutsen Ginion | | | Ret | | | 33 | | | 27 | | | 56 | 56 | Ret | | | 36 | | | | | 0 |
| | (France) Éric Cayrolle (Italy) Gabriele Lancieri | (France) Sport Garage | | | | | | | | | | | | 49 | 39 | 28 | | | | | | | | 0 |
| | (France) Jean-Luc Beaubelique | (France) AKKA ASP | | | Ret | | | 28 | | | Ret | | | | | | | | 46 | | | | | 0 |
| | (France) Philippe Giauque | (France) AKKA ASP | | | Ret | | | 28 | | | Ret | | | | | | | | | | | | | 0 |
| | (Sweden) Henrik Hedman (United States) Elton Julian (Italy) Thomas Kemenater | (United States) DragonSpeed | | | 37 | | | 49 | | | 29 | | | 38 | 36 | Ret | | | 51 | | | | | 0 |
| | (Hong Kong) Marchy Lee (Hong Kong) Shaun Thong | (Germany) Phoenix Racing | | | | | | 34 | | | 40 | | | | | | | | 30 | | | | | 0 |
| | (Switzerland) Pierre Hirschi | (France) Classic & Modern Racing | | | 44 | | | 48 | | | Ret | | | 42 | 30 | Ret | | | Ret | | | | | 0 |
| | (France) Jean-Luc Blanchemain | (France) Classic & Modern Racing | | | 44 | | | 48 | | | | | | 42 | 30 | Ret | | | Ret | | | | | 0 |
| | (Belgium) Christian Kelders | (France) Classic & Modern Racing | | | 44 | | | | | | Ret | | | 42 | 30 | Ret | | | Ret | | | | | 0 |
| | (Belgium) Frédéric Bouvy | (France) Classic & Modern Racing | | | | | | | | | | | | 42 | 30 | Ret | | | | | | | | 0 |
| | (Russia) Garry Kondakov (Russia) Alexander Moiseev (Italy) Riccardo Ragazzi | (Italy) AF Corse | | | 46 | | | 54 | | | DNS | | | 31 | 38 | 32 | | | 50 | | | | | 0 |
| | (Portugal) Rui Águas | (Italy) AF Corse | | | | | | | | | | | | 31 | 38 | 32 | | | | | | | | 0 |
| | (Germany) Peter Schmidt | (Germany) Car Collection Motorsport | | | Ret | | | | | | 32 | | | | | | | | 49 | | | | | 0 |
| | (Germany) Pierre Ehret | (Germany) Car Collection Motorsport | | | 42 | | | 45 | | | 32 | | | | | | | | 45 | | | | | 0 |
| | (Netherlands) Renger van der Zande | (Germany) Car Collection Motorsport | | | | | | | | | 32 | | | | | | | | | | | | | 0 |
| | (France) Sylvain Debs (United Arab Emirates) Bashar Mardini (France) Nicolas Misslin | (France) Sport Garage | | | | | | | | | 33 | | | | | | | | | | | | | 0 |
| | (France) Ludovic Badey | (France) AKKA ASP | | | | | | 35 | | | | | | | | | | | | | | | | 0 |
| | (United Kingdom) Ryan Dalziel (United States) Anthony Lazzaro | (United States) DragonSpeed | | | | | | | | | | | | 38 | 36 | Ret | | | | | | | | 0 |
| | (France) Christophe Hamon | (France) Sport Garage | | | | | | 38 | | | | | | | | | | | | | | | | 0 |
| | (France) Christophe Hamon | (Belgium) Belgian Audi Club Team WRT (Note: Entered as Audi Sport Team WRT with car No. 2 and as Team WRT with car No. 4.) | | | | | | | | | | | | | | | | | 40 | | | | | 0 |
| | (France) Luc Paillard | (France) Sport Garage | | | | | | 38 | | | | | | | | | | | | | | | | 0 |
| | (France) Jean-Marc Bachelier (Italy) Howard Blank (France) Yannick Mallegol | (Italy) AF Corse | | | 39 | | | 44 | | | Ret | | | | | | | | | | | | | 0 |
| | (United Kingdom) Bradley Ellis (United Kingdom) Euan Hankey (Turkey) Salih Yoluç | (United Kingdom) TF Sport | | | | | | | | | | | | | | | | | 39 | | | | | 0 |
| | (France) David Hallyday | (Belgium) Belgian Audi Club Team WRT | | | | | | 43 | | | | | | | | | | | 40 | | | | | 0 |
| | (France) Lonni Martins | (Belgium) Belgian Audi Club Team WRT | | | | | | | | | | | | | | | | | 40 | | | | | 0 |
| | (France) Gilles Lallemant | (France) Saintéloc | | | | | | 52 | | | Ret | | | 47 | 41 | Ret | | | 48 | | | | | 0 |
| | (France) Michael Blanchemain (Italy) Beniamino Caccia (France) Philippe Haezebrouck | (France) Saintéloc | | | | | | | | | | | | 47 | 41 | Ret | | | | | | | | 0 |
| | (Portugal) Miguel Ramos | (Germany) Attempto Racing | | | 41 | | | Ret | | | Ret | | | | | | | | | | | | | 0 |
| | (Netherlands) Martin Lanting (Belgium) Louis-Philippe Soenen (Belgium) Patrick Van Glabeke | (Italy) AF Corse | | | | | | | | | 41 | | | | | | | | | | | | | 0 |
| | (Germany) Alexander Mattschull | (Germany) Car Collection Motorsport | | | 42 | | | 45 | | | | | | | | | | | 45 | | | | | 0 |
| | (Russia) Vadim Gitlin | (Germany) Attempto Racing | | | | | | 42 | | | Ret | | | | | | | | | | | | | 0 |
| | (Finland) Antti Buri (United Kingdom) Oliver Webb | (Germany) Attempto Racing | | | | | | 42 | | | | | | | | | | | | | | | | 0 |
| | (France) Jean-Paul Buffin (France) Georges Cabanne | (France) Saintéloc | | | 43 | | | 52 | | | Ret | | | | | | | | | | | | | 0 |
| | (France) Marc Sourd | (France) Saintéloc | | | 43 | | | | | | | | | | | | | | | | | | | 0 |
| | (France) Phillippe Gaillard | (Belgium) Belgian Audi Club Team WRT | | | | | | 43 | | | | | | | | | | | | | | | | 0 |
| | (United Kingdom) Adam Christodoulou (Sweden) Andreas Simonsen (Belgium) Nico Verdonck | (Germany) Black Falcon | | | | | | | | | | | | 44 | 48 | Ret | | | | | | | | 0 |
| | (Italy) Andrea Piccini | (Switzerland) Kessel Racing | | | | | | | | | | | | 45 | 49 | Ret | | | | | | | | 0 |
| | (Italy) Alessandro Balzan (Italy) Ronnie Valori | (Germany) Attempto Racing | | | 48 | | | | | | | | | | | | | | | | | | | 0 |
| | (France) Thomas Nicolle | (France) Classic & Modern Racing | | | | | | 48 | | | | | | | | | | | | | | | | 0 |
| | (France) Grégoire Demoustier | (France) Saintéloc | | | | | | | | | | | | | | | | | | 48 | | | | 0 |
| | (Switzerland) Daniel Allemann (Austria) Karl Wendlinger | (Germany) Car Collection Motorsport | | | | | | | | | | | | | | | | | 49 | | | | | 0 |
| | (France) Claude-Yves Gosselin (France) Jean-Claude Lagniez | (France) Saintéloc | | | | | | 50 | | | | | | | | | | | | | | | | 0 |
| | (France) Nicolas Lapierre | (New Zealand) Von Ryan Racing | | | | | | 53 | | | Ret | | | | | | | | | | | | | 0 |
| | (Italy) Michele Rugolo | (Italy) AF Corse | | | | | | | | | | | | 54 | 54 | Ret | | | | | | | | 0 |
| | (Belgium) Marc Duez (Belgium) Jean-Michel Martin (Belgium) Eric van de Poele (Belgium) Pascal Witmeur | (Belgium) BMW Racing Against Cancer | | | | | | | | | | | | 55 | 55 | Ret | | | | | | | | 0 |
| | (Italy) Fabio Onidi (Italy) Andrea Roda | (Czech Republic) ISR | | | DNS | | | 55 | | | | | | | | | | | | | | | | 0 |
| | (South Africa) Jordan Grogor (Germany) Werner Hamprecht | (Belgium) Boutsen Ginion | | | | | | | | | | | | 56 | 56 | Ret | | | | | | | | 0 |
| | (France) Romain Brandela (France) Eric Clément (Belgium) Bernard Delhez (France) Gilles Duqueine | (France) Duqueine Engineering | | | | | | | | | | | | 57 | 57 | Ret | | | | | | | | 0 |
| | (South Africa) Kelvin van der Linde | (Belgium) Belgian Audi Club Team WRT | | | Ret | | | | | | | | | | | | | | | | | | | |
| | (Germany) Marc Gassner | (United Kingdom) Nissan GT Academy Team RJN | | | Ret | | | | | | | | | | | | | | | | | | | |
| | (Austria) Dominik Baumann (Germany) Claudia Hürtgen (Germany) Max Sandritter | (Germany) BMW Sports Trophy Team Schubert | | | | | | Ret | | | | | | | | | | | | | | | | |
| | (Germany) Thomas Jäger | (Germany) Rowe Racing | | | | | | | | | Ret | | | | | | | | | | | | | |
| | (Argentina) Juan Cruz Álvarez (Argentina) Gustavo Borches (Turkey) Sergio Alejandro Yazbil | (Germany) Attempto Racing | | | | | | | | | Ret | | | | | | | | | | | | | |
| | (United Kingdom) Harry Tincknell | (United Kingdom) Nissan GT Academy Team RJN | | | | | | | | | | | | | | | | | Ret | | | | | |
Guest drivers ineligible for points
| | (Brazil) Ricardo Sperafico | (Brazil) BMW Sports Trophy Team Brasil | 9 | 10 | 32 | | | | | | | | | | | | | | | | | | | 0 |
| | (Brazil) Rodrigo Sperafico | (Brazil) BMW Sports Trophy Team Brasil | 9 | 10 | | | | | | | | | | | | | | | | | | | | 0 |

Notes

- ^{1} – Markus Winkelhock was unable to score at Moscow, because he did not share his car with another driver. His regular teammate Nikolaus Mayr-Melnhof had to go home just before the event started.

=== Teams' Championship ===
| Pos. | Team | Manufacturer | Points |
|---|---|---|---|
| 1 | (Belgium) Belgian Audi Club Team WRT | Audi | 248 |
| 2 | (Germany) Bentley Team HTP | Bentley | 148 |
| 3 | (Germany) Rinaldi Racing | Ferrari | 123 |
| 4 | (Brazil) BMW Sports Trophy Team Brasil | BMW | 119 |
| 5 | (Germany) Phoenix Racing | Audi | 77 |
| 6 | (Austria) Grasser Racing Team | Lamborghini | 76 |
| 7 | (United Kingdom) Bentley M-Sport | Bentley | 70 |
| 8 | (Czech Republic) ISR | Audi | 68 |
| 9 | (New Zealand) Von Ryan Racing | McLaren | 59 |
| 10 | (Belgium) BMW Sports Trophy Team Marc VDS | BMW | 58 |
| 11 | (Germany) Reiter Engineering | Lamborghini | 57 |
| 11 | (United Kingdom) Nissan GT Academy Team RJN | Nissan | 57 |
| 12 | (Germany) Rowe Racing/Team Astana by Rowe | Mercedes-Benz | 45 |
| 13 | (Russia) GT Russian Team | Mercedes-Benz | 42 |
| 13 | (Germany) MRS GT-Racing | Nissan | 42 |
| 14 | (Germany) Attempto Racing | McLaren/Porsche | 35 |
| 15 | (Italy) AF Corse | Ferrari | 34 |
| 16 | (United States) Always Evolving Motorsport | Nissan | 26 |
| 17 | (France) Saintéloc | Audi | 23 |
| 18 | (Switzerland) Kessel Racing | Ferrari | 20 |
| 19 | (Germany) Black Falcon | Mercedes-Benz | 11 |
| 20 | (United Kingdom) Ecurie Ecosse | BMW | 10 |
| 21 | Team Russia by Barwell | BMW | 8 |
| 22 | (France) AKKA ASP | Ferrari | 6 |
| 23 | (Italy) ROAL Motorsport | Ferrari | 4 |
| 23 | (United Kingdom) Leonard Motorsport AMR | Aston Martin | 4 |
| 25 | Oman Racing Team | Aston Martin | 2 |
| 26 | (Switzerland) Fach Auto Tech | Porsche | 1 |
| 26 | (United Kingdom) Triple Eight Racing | BMW | 1 |
| | Insight Racing Denmark | Ferrari | 0 |
| | (France) TDS Racing | BMW | 0 |
| | (United Kingdom) Team Parker Racing | Audi | 0 |
| | (France) Sport Garage | Ferrari | 0 |
| | (Switzerland) Emil Frey Racing | Jaguar | 0 |
| | (Germany) Car Collection Motorsport | Mercedes-Benz | 0 |
| | (Germany) Black PearL Racing by Rinaldi | Ferrari | 0 |
| | (Belgium) Delahaye Racing Team | Porsche | 0 |
| | (Switzerland) Glorax Racing | Ferrari | 0 |
| | (United States) DragonSpeed | Ferrari | 0 |
| | (France) Classic & Modern Racing | BMW | 0 |
| | (Belgium) Boutsen Ginion | BMW | 0 |
| | (United Kingdom) TF Sport | Aston Martin | 0 |
| | (Belgium) BMW Racing Against Cancer | BMW | 0 |
| | (France) Duqueine Engineering | Ferrari | 0 |
| | (Germany) BMW Sports Trophy Team Schubert | BMW | 0 |

== See also ==
- 2015 Blancpain Endurance Series
- 2015 Blancpain Sprint Series
