= Robin Frijns =

Dutch racing driver (born 1991)

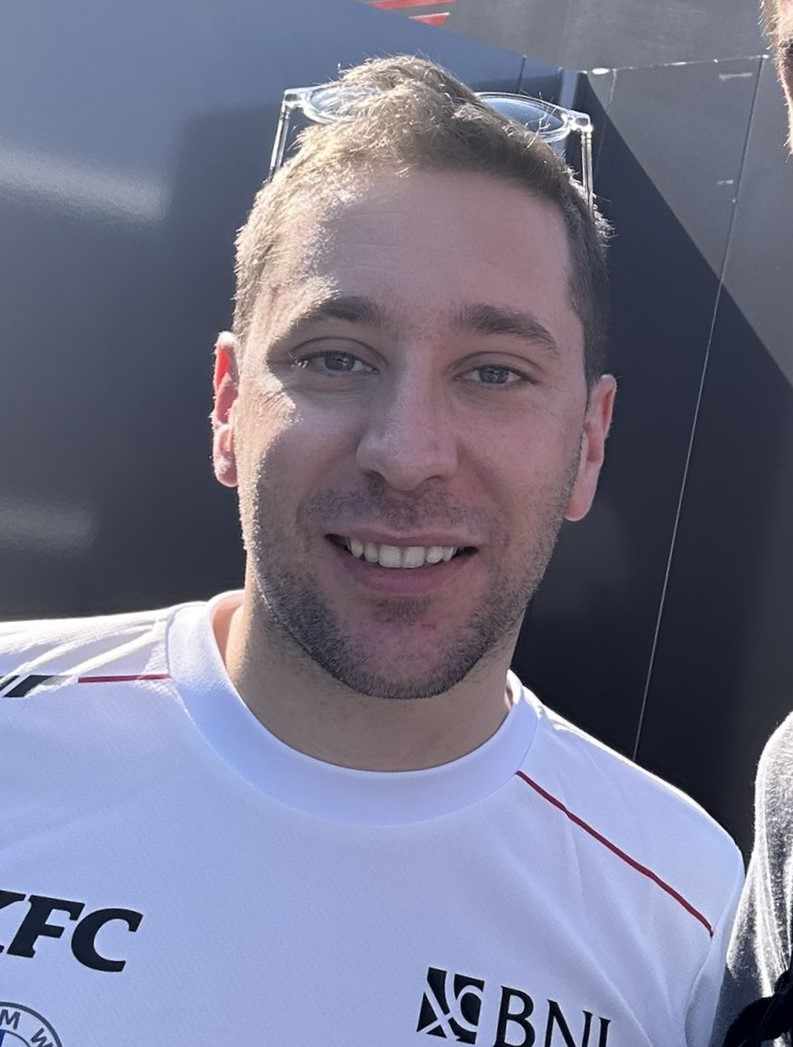
- Frijns in 2023
- Nationality: (Netherlands) Dutch
- Born: Robin Christiaan Maria Frijns; 7 August 1991 (age 35) Maastricht, Netherlands

FIA World Endurance Championship career
- Debut season: 2021
- Current team: Team WRT
- Categorisation: FIA Platinum
- Car number: 31
- Starts: 42
- Championships: 1 (2021)
- Wins: 7
- Poles: 2
- Fastest laps: 3
- Best finish: 1st in 2021

Previous series
- 2018-2020 2015-2018 2013 2012 2011 2010–11 2009–10: Deutsche Tourenwagen Masters; Blancpain Sprint Series; GP2 Series; Formula Renault 3.5 Series; Eurocup Formula Renault 2.0; Formula Renault 2.0 NEC; Formula BMW Europe

Championship titles
- 2021 2017 2015 2012 2011 2010: FIA World Endurance Championship - LMP2; Blancpain GT Series Sprint Cup; Blancpain GT Series; Formula Renault 3.5 Series; Eurocup Formula Renault 2.0; Formula BMW Europe

Formula E career
- Debut season: 2015–16
- Car number: 4
- Former teams: MS Amlin Andretti, ABT CUPRA Formula E Team, Envision Racing
- Starts: 117
- Championships: 0
- Wins: 2
- Podiums: 16
- Poles: 2
- Fastest laps: 5
- Best finish: 4th in 2018–19
- Finished last season: 19th (23 pts)

Robin Christiaan Maria Frijns (born 7 August 1991) is a Dutch racing driver.

Frijns achieved considerable success in his junior career, with back-to-back titles in Formula BMW, Formula Renault Eurocup and the Formula Renault 3.5 Series, which he won against Jules Bianchi in 2012. Frijns tested for Red Bull, Sauber and Caterham, but lacked the funding to reach Formula One. Instead, Frijns joined Audi as factory driver and won the Blancpain GT Series on debut in 2015, its Sprint Cup in 2017, the Bathurst 12 Hour in 2018, and the Nürburgring 24 Hours in 2022. He also raced in the DTM from 2018 to 2020, placing third in the latter.

After Audi froze its LMDh project in 2022, Frijns moved to BMW M Team WRT in the FIA World Endurance Championship.

Frijns also drove for Team WRT in LMP2, where he won the WEC and the 24 Hours of Le Mans in 2021. In parallel, Frijns competed in Formula E from 2015 to 2025. He spent six seasons at Envision Virgin Racing, and finished fourth in 2018–19 with two wins.

== Junior racing career ==
=== Karting ===
Born in Maastricht, Netherlands, Frijns has been an active kart racer in Belgium and France. In 2008, he finished third in the KF2 European Championship category and runner-up in the French Championship, at the same level.

=== Formula BMW ===
Frijns began his formula racing career in the 2009 Formula BMW Europe season with Josef Kaufmann Racing. He finished third overall in the championship, with a win at Silverstone and six podiums. He also finished as the highest-placed rookie in the championship.

=== Formula Renault ===
==== 2010 ====
Frijns made his first attempt at Formula Renault 2.0, racing at the Spa-Francorchamps round of the 2010 Northern European Cup. Driving for Josef Kaufman Racing once more, Frijns finished second in the first race of the meeting, fifth in the second race, and won the third.

==== 2011 ====
In 2011, Frijns joined the Eurocup Formula Renault 2.0 championship full-time, continuing to drive for Josef Kaufman Racing. He won the title on his first attempt, winning five races over the course of the season – including both races at Silverstone – and finishing forty-five points ahead of his nearest rival, Carlos Sainz Jr.

Frijns also competed in the Northern European Cup, finishing the season fourth overall, despite missing the Oschersleben, Most and Monza rounds of the championship. Over the course of the season, he won one race and finished on the podium seven times.

==== Formula Renault 3.5 ====
In 2012, Frijns made the transition to the Formula Renault 3.5 Series – the highest tier of the World Series by Renault – this time racing for British team Fortec Motorsports. As in 2011, Frijns won the title on his first attempt, winning races at Motorland Aragón, the Moscow Raceway and the Hungaroring, and scoring five podiums and four poles over the course of the season.

Frijns' title came amidst controversy when he was involved in a collision with rival driver Jules Bianchi in the final race of the season in Barcelona. Bianchi passed Frijns at the start of lap 21, and he quickly came under more pressure from Carlin driver Kevin Magnussen. Magnussen made an attempt to pass Frijns at the Repsol corner, but Frijns moved to block him. The move forced Bianchi wide, and he skirted across the gravel trap and into the wall and retirement. Frijns went on to finish the race in seventh place, but race stewards decided that he had caused an avoidable collision and twenty-five seconds were added to his race time, demoting him to fourteenth place. As Bianchi had failed to score, and fellow title rival Sam Bird had failed to score enough points, Frijns' title remained intact. In the days following the meeting, Bianchi accused Frijns of intentionally running him off the road, a charge which Frijns denied.

=== GP2 Series ===
After the end of 2012, Frijns announced that he would not compete in Formula Renault 3.5 in 2013 and after his announcement at Sauber as test driver, his new team expressed their desire for Frijns to be racing in 2013 as he would not be testing for them full-time in 2013.

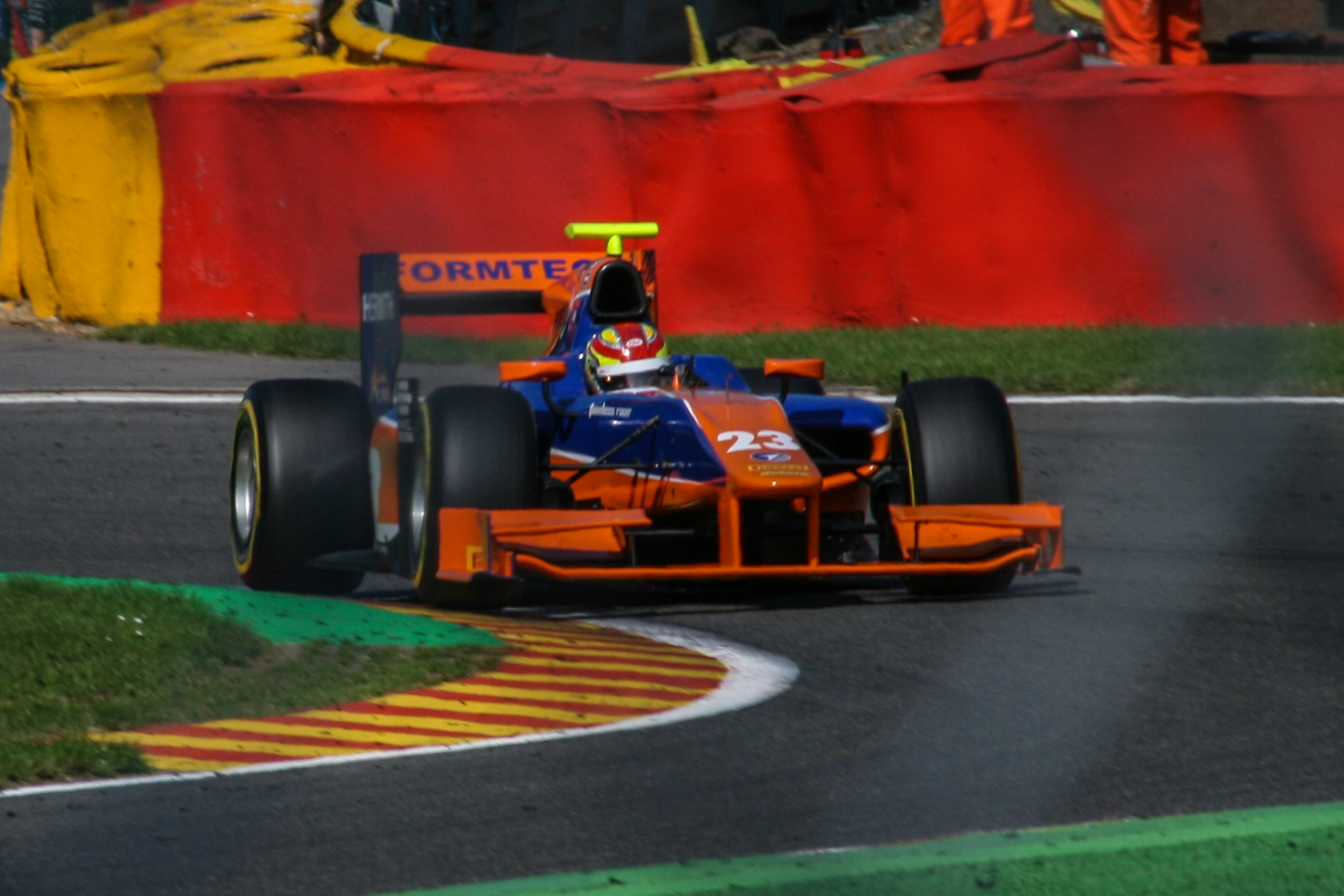
Frijns during the 2013 Spa-Francorchamps GP2 Series round

After an impressive test with Mercedes' DTM team, Frijns was not offered a drive with the manufacturer. Frijns instead opted to try for a GP2 seat, and tested with veteran team Trident Racing and new team Russian Time. Frijns showed impressive pace and Trident's team principal Maurizio Salvadori praised him and stated his intentions to have Frijns race for the team. However a lack of funding put him on the sidelines for the start of 2013 in Malaysia.

Before the second race in Bahrain, Frijns announced that he would race with new-for-2013 team Hilmer for the second event of the season, replacing Conor Daly and partnering Pål Varhaug. Frijns qualified in a very respectable tenth position ahead of pre-season favourite James Calado, but struggled to adapt to the new Pirelli tyres in the races, before a collision in the first race with Stéphane Richelmi whilst in a points-scoring position compromised his weekend. Team principal Franz Hilmer however was impressed with Frijns and hoped he could compete full-time with the team in 2013.

In only his second weekend, Frijns took a win and a second place at Circuit de Catalunya supporting the 2013 Spanish Grand Prix.

== Formula One ==
On 18 October 2012, Sauber announced that Frijns would be driving their car during the third round of Young Drivers Test in Abu Dhabi alongside the team's testing and reserve driver Esteban Gutiérrez. As the highest-placed Formula Renault driver not attached to any established Formula One team, Frijns was also added to Red Bull Racing's line-up for the test.

Reflecting on Frijns' 2012 season, ESPN commentator Ben Evans opined that "anything less than a Formula One race seat next year would be a travesty".

On 23 November 2012, it was announced that Frijns would become part of Sauber, and would serve as test and reserve driver in 2013.

On 21 January 2014, Frijns confirmed that he would be a reserve driver for Caterham in the 2014 season.

== Formula E career ==
=== Andretti Autosport (2015–2017) ===
==== 2015–16 season ====
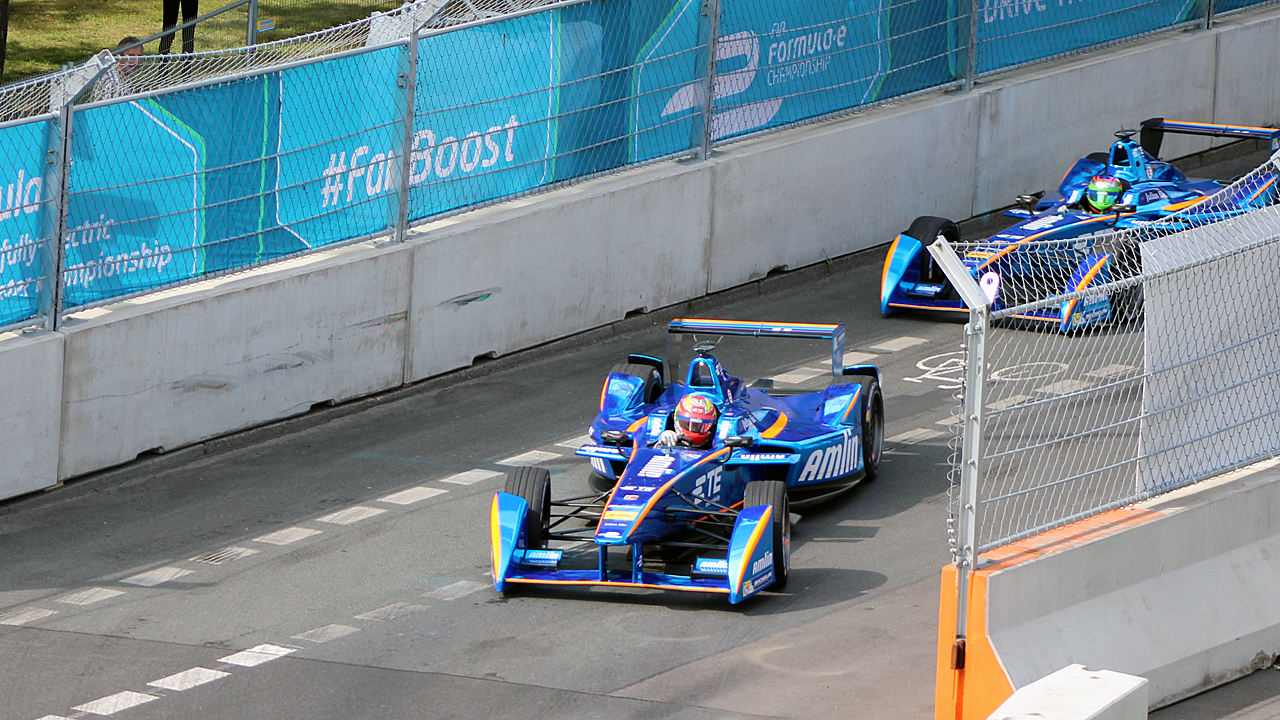
Frijns (front) during the 2016 Berlin ePrix

On 24 August 2015, it was announced that Frijns would partner fellow former Sauber test driver Simona de Silvestro at Andretti for the 2015–16 Formula E season. He came tenth in his first race and scored a podium in Putrajaya. Frijns finished in the points in the following two races making him the first Formula E rookie to finish his first four races in the top-ten. After four races, Frijns had scored all of Andretti's points tally of 21. He finished 12th in the standings.

==== 2016–17 season ====
Frijns was retained by Andretti for the 2016-17 Formula E season and partnered Antonio Felix da Costa.

=== Envision Virgin Racing/Envision Racing first stint (2018–2022) ===
==== 2018–19 season ====
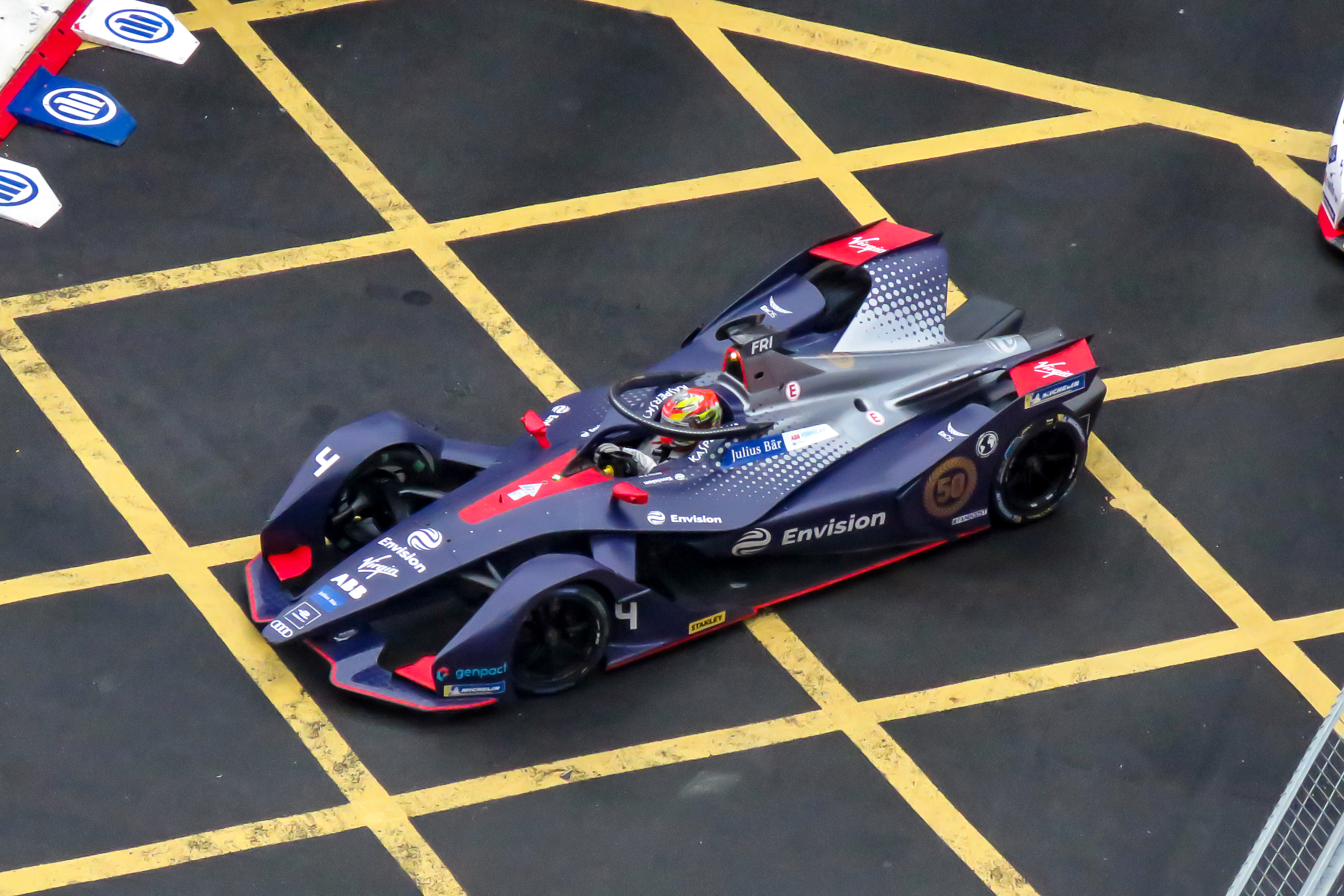
Frijns during the 2019 Hong Kong ePrix

After one season absent, Frijns joined Envision Virgin Racing for the 2018-2019 Formula E season, partnered by Sam Bird. The Envision Virgin Racing team, suffered a difficult start to the season in Ad Diriyah, with Frijns starting from 20th position on the grid, just behind teammate Bird. Frijns managed to make his way up to 12th. He took his first podium for the team at the Marrakesh E-Prix, coming very close to overtaking Mahindra Racing's Jérome d'Ambrosio, but ultimately finishing second. Frijns drove a controlled race in Santiago, finishing in fifth, whilst Bird took the race victory. A forgettable weekend came next in Mexico City, starting 20th, after both Envision Virgin Racing cars hit problems in qualifying, battling his way up to 11th. Teammate Sam Bird, took the chequered flag first in Formula E's 50th ePrix in Hong Kong, but was denied the win after being found guilty of hitting André Lotterer, dropping Bird down to sixth place. Venturi's Edoardo Mortara inherited the race victory, promoting Lucas di Grassi into second and crucially Frijns to third, for his second podium finish of the 2018–19 season. For the next race in Sanya, Frijns had run in the top-ten for the entirety of the race and was set for big points, until a tangle with Sébastien Buemi on the penultimate lap, ended Frijns' race after crashing heavily into Lucas di Grassi. Frijns finished in fourth, for the Rome ePrix, making use of Attack Mode to pass Buemi and Oliver Rowland. For the Paris ePrix, Frijns started from third on the grid, behind Buemi and Rowland, but when both drivers hit trouble, he took the lead and dominated in tricky conditions, mastering torrential rain and hailstones. André Lotterer closed in on Frijns, who had a damaged front wing, towards the end of the race, but the Dutch driver did enough to hold on and win the ePrix. On the cool-down lap, Frijns stopped at a marshall's post to pick up a Dutch flag, which he revealed had been pre-agreed. At the next race in Monaco, Frijns had started towards the back of the grid, but made several overtakes, most notably one on Alex Lynn at Tabac, to get him into a top-ten position. He pushed his luck with the overtaking however and tried an ambitious move on Alexander Sims into Ste. Devote. It didn't pay off and it ended Frijns' race. In Berlin, Frijns had technical issues in the group qualifying stages and started plum-last in 22nd. Whilst he made progress, it wasn't enough for points and he languished in 13th. At the next race in Bern, Frijns was hit by Jérome d'Ambrosio, before they even got to the first corner. Frijns speared across the track and into Alex Lynn and was forced to retire with broken suspension. d'Ambrosio would receive a penalty for the collision. For the finale weekend in New York, Frijns would be challenging for the title, however in race 1, he was victim to the bumper-car style driving of his Formula E counterparts and was forced to retire from the race. For the second race, Frijns made it into the Superpole shootout and qualified second behind Alexander Sims. At the start of the race, Frijns lost second to Sébastien Buemi, but overtook the Nissan and the BMW i Andretti drivers to take his second ever Formula E victory. The win put him fourth in the drivers championship after a last-lap crash between Mitch Evans and Lucas di Grassi, also helping the Envision Virgin team take third in the constructors championship from Nissan e.Dams.

==== 2019–20 season ====
Frijns remained with Envision for the 2019–20 Formula E season alongside Sam Bird again. Frijns started the season well taking fifth place after driving through the field in the first race of the 2019 Diriyah ePrix, but crashed out of the second race to record a DNF. During qualifying at the next race at Santiago, Frijns spun spectacularly whilst on his fast lap & consigned himself to the back of the grid. He struggled in the race & finished a lowly 15th. He returned to form at Mexico City & was running high up in the points & in podium contention until he was wiped out by the Mercedes EQ car of Nyck de Vries who was using Fanboost to attack António Félix da Costa. Frijns continued, albeit well down the order & was eventually disqualified having finished out of the top-ten anyway. In the next race in Marrakesh, Frijns made progress up the field but only finished 12th. He ended the season in 12th with 58 points.

==== 2020–21 season ====
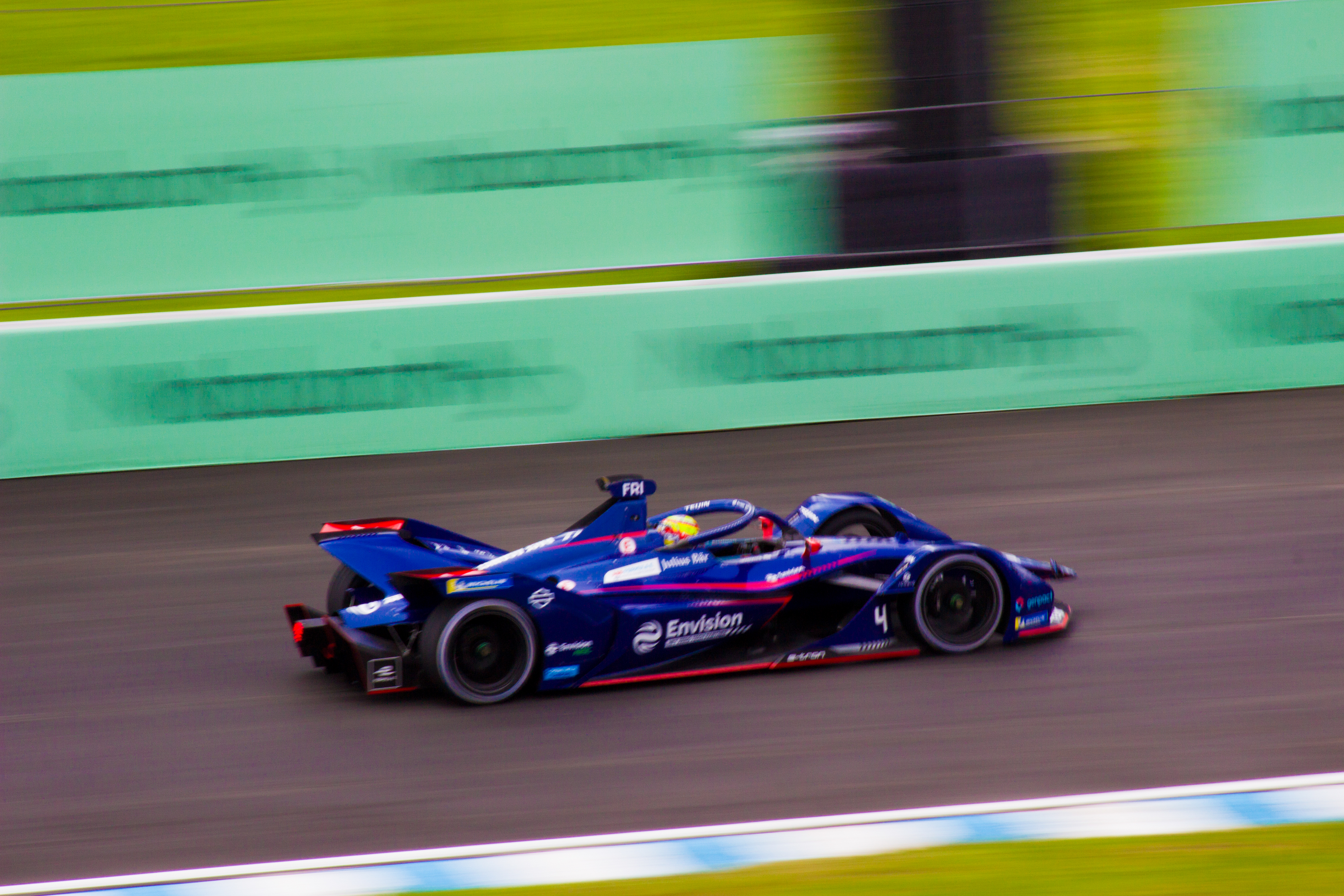
Frijns at the 2021 Puebla ePrix

Frijns remained with Envision for the 2020–21 season, alongside a new teammate, Nick Cassidy. He scored his first points of the season in round 2 in Diriyah with a pole position and a second-place finish. He would match the second in Monaco, taking it at the line from António Félix da Costa and finishing 0.024s in front. There were two fastest laps in the first Valencia and second London races, and finished the championship in fifth on 89 points.

==== 2021–22 season ====
Frijns stayed with Envision alongside Nick Cassidy for the 2021–22 season. Frijns finished seventh in the championship, with four podiums and 126 points.

=== ABT Cupra (2023) ===
==== 2022–23 season ====
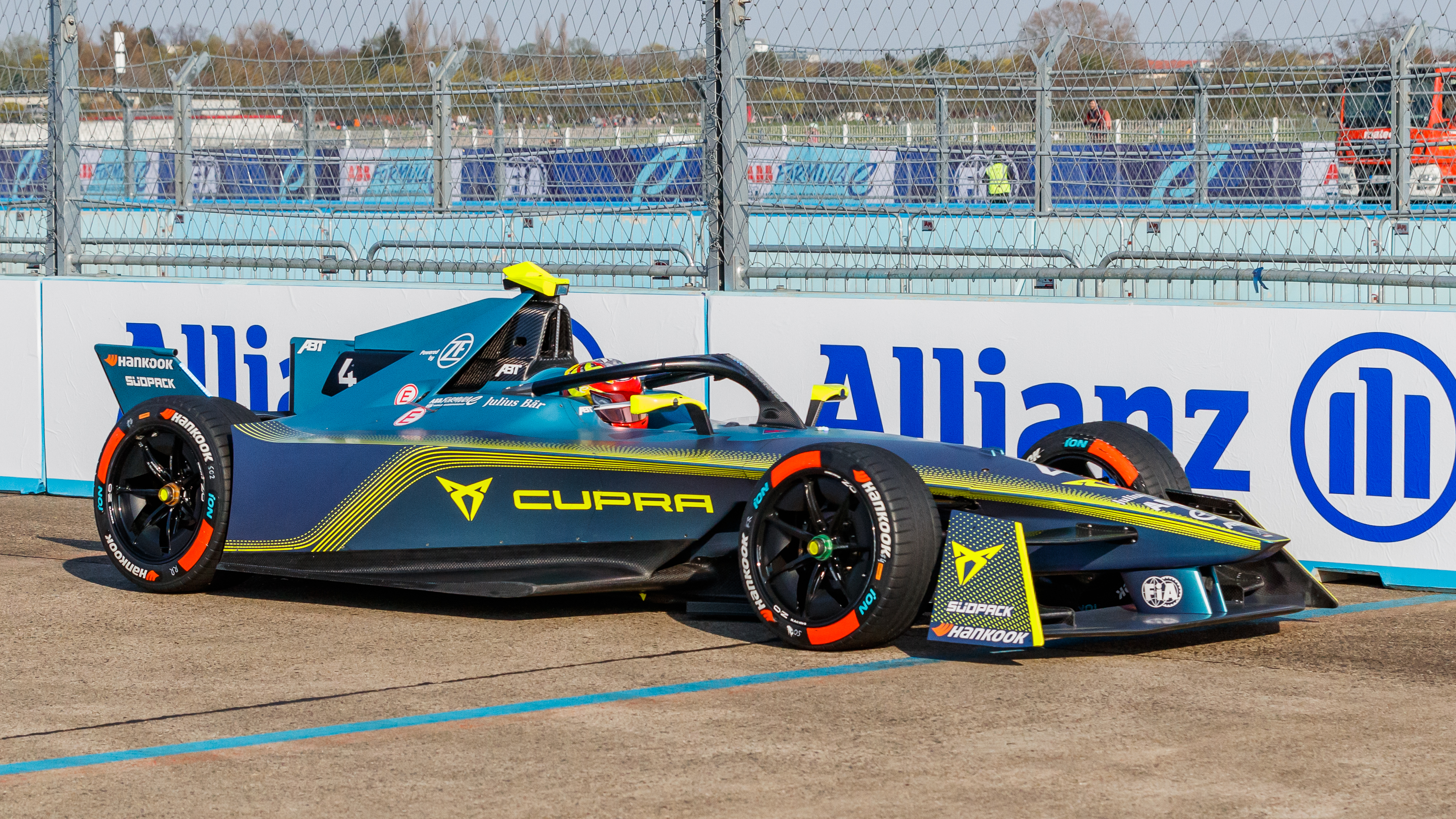
Frijns at the 2023 Berlin ePrix.

After four straight seasons with Envision, Frijns switched to new team ABT Sportsline, teaming up with Nico Müller for the 2022–23 season. The season started at Mexico City, where, having qualified 20th, Frijns was involved in a collision with Norman Nato on the opening lap, which ended up breaking the Dutchman's left wrist and forced him to undergo surgery shortly after. As a result, Frijns missed the next round at Diriyah, held two weeks after Mexico, and was replaced by Kelvin van der Linde. Frijns also missed the third and fourth rounds at Hyderabad and Cape Town. Frijns eventually returned in São Paulo. He managed to end the race in 14th place, ahead of three other cars. During the Berlin double header, Frijns again finished in 14th place in the first race. However, his breakthrough came when Frijns shockingly claimed pole under wet conditions, forming an ABT Cupra 1-2 alongside teammate Müller. During the race, he fell back down to earth with 17th place but still grabbed his first points of the year with his pole. Frijns secured his best finish so far of the year in Monaco, with 13th.

Frijns finished in the points-paying positions for the first time that year in Jakarta, ending ninth during the first race. At the Portland, Frijns again rescued points with tenth, having run in third place at one point of the race A double retirement in Rome followed before ending the season with 17th at the London ePrix. Frijns ended the season 22nd in the standings with six points, his worst Formula E campaign to date and was outscored by teammate Müller. Shortly before the final race, it was announced that Frijns' contract for 2024 was terminated.

=== Return to Envision Racing (2024–2025) ===
==== 2023–24 season ====
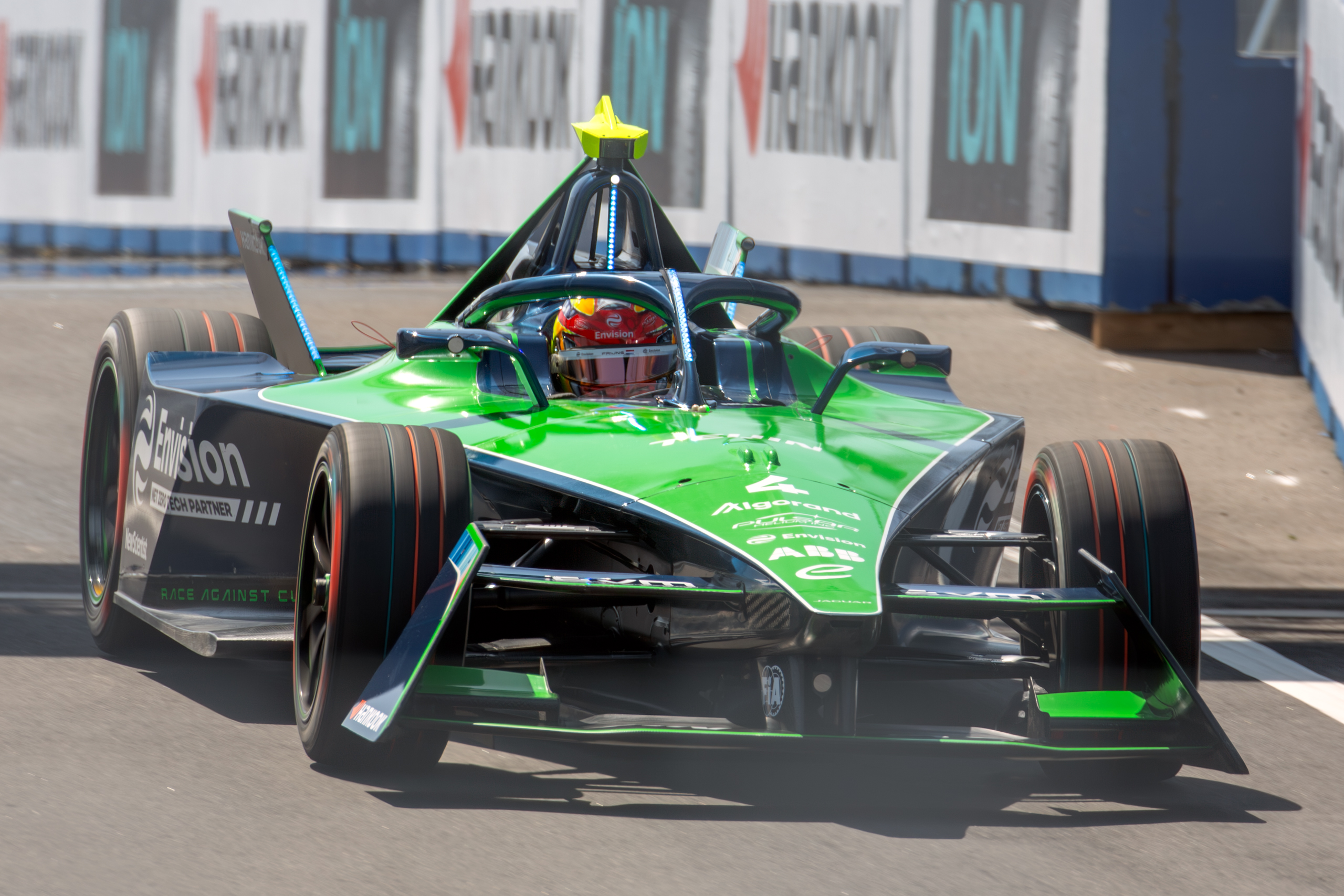
Frijns at the 2024 Tokyo ePrix

For the 2023–24 season, Frijns returned to the defending champion Envision Racing, partnering Sébastien Buemi and replacing the outgoing Nick Cassidy.

==== 2024–25 season ====
Frijns and Sébastien Buemi continued with Envision Racing for the 2024–25 season. At the end of the season, Frijns would depart the team for a second time.

== Sportscar career ==
=== Blancpain GT Series (2015) ===
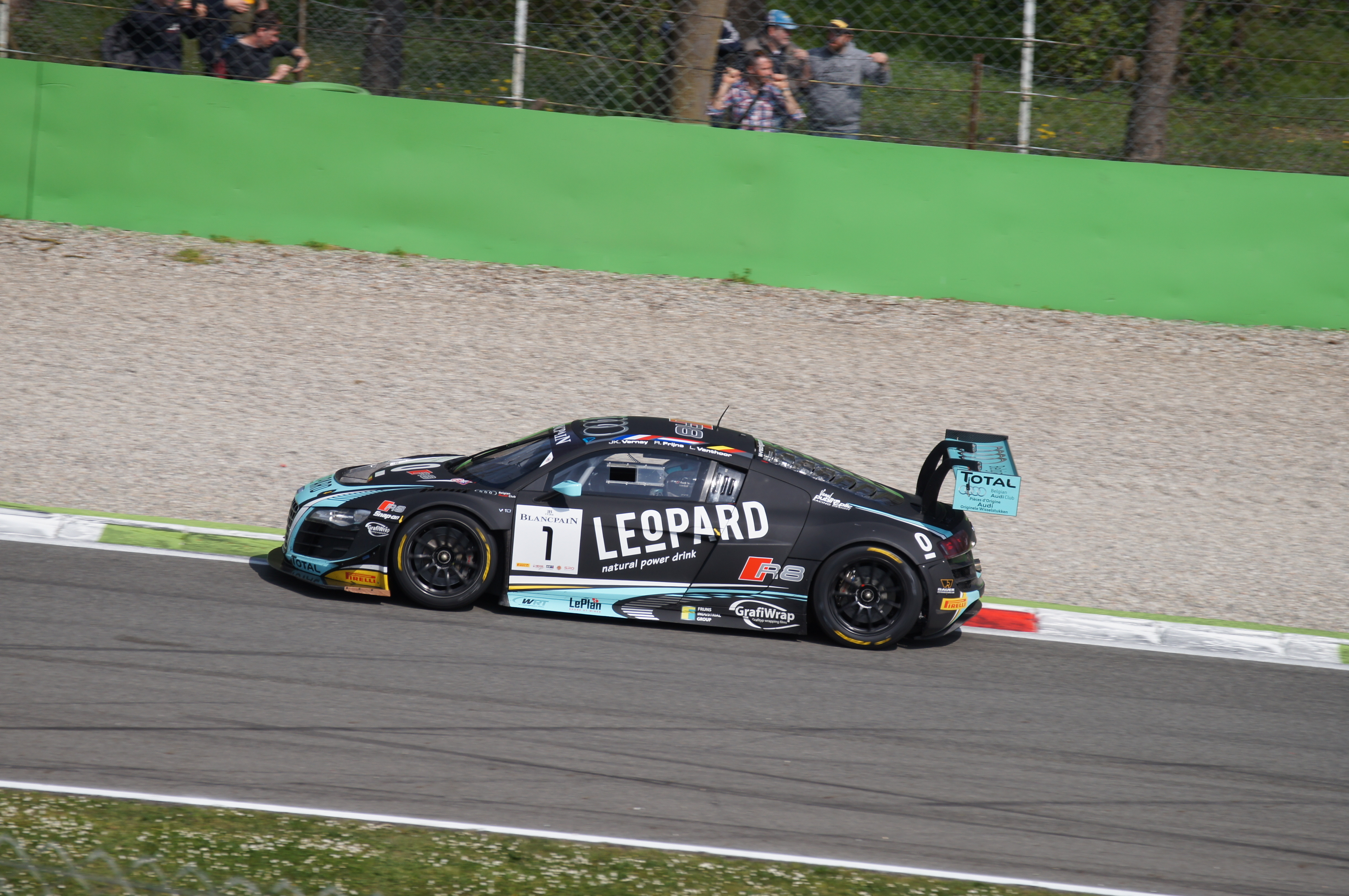
Audi R8 LMS driven by Frijns, Laurens Vanthoor and Jean-Karl Vernay at the 2015 3 Hours of Monza in the Blancpain Endurance Series

In 2015, Frijns joined Belgium Belgian Audi Club Team WRT to drive an Audi R8 in the Blancpain GT Series, partnering with Laurens Vanthoor and Jean-Karl Vernay in the Endurance Series and being paired up with the former for the majority of the GT Sprint Series campaign. Despite missing the opening round at Nogaro after Frijns crashed the car in qualifying, the team bounced back with a pair of double victories at Brands Hatch and Zolder. Another victory came in the Algarve, helping Frijns to finish second in the Sprint Series standings, losing out to the pairing of Vincent Abril and Maximilian Buhk during the final round. In the Endurance Series, a pair of podiums at the start of the campaign put Frijns into the championship battle, though scoring no points from the 24 Hours of Spa would destroy any title hopes. Nevertheless, Frijns had amassed enough points in both series to be crowned the overall Blancpain GT Series champion in his debut year of sportscar racing.

Frijns returned to the team in 2016, once again competing in the Endurance and Sprint cups. He would be unable to defend his Blancpain title, with season highlights being a lone win in the season finale of the Sprint series, with which he helped full-time driver and teammate Enzo Ide towards a drivers' title, and a victory at the Sepang 12 Hours alongside Christopher Haase and Laurens Vanthoor.

Another year at WRT followed, as Frijns teamed up with Stuart Leonard in the Sprint Cup, whilst driving in selected rounds of the Endurance Cup. Despite missing the opening event of the former series, Frijns would end up with the drivers' championship in dramatic fashion, winning the final race and the title thanks to troubles encountered by his title rivals.

=== Deutsche Tourenwagen Masters (2018–2020) ===
==== 2018 ====
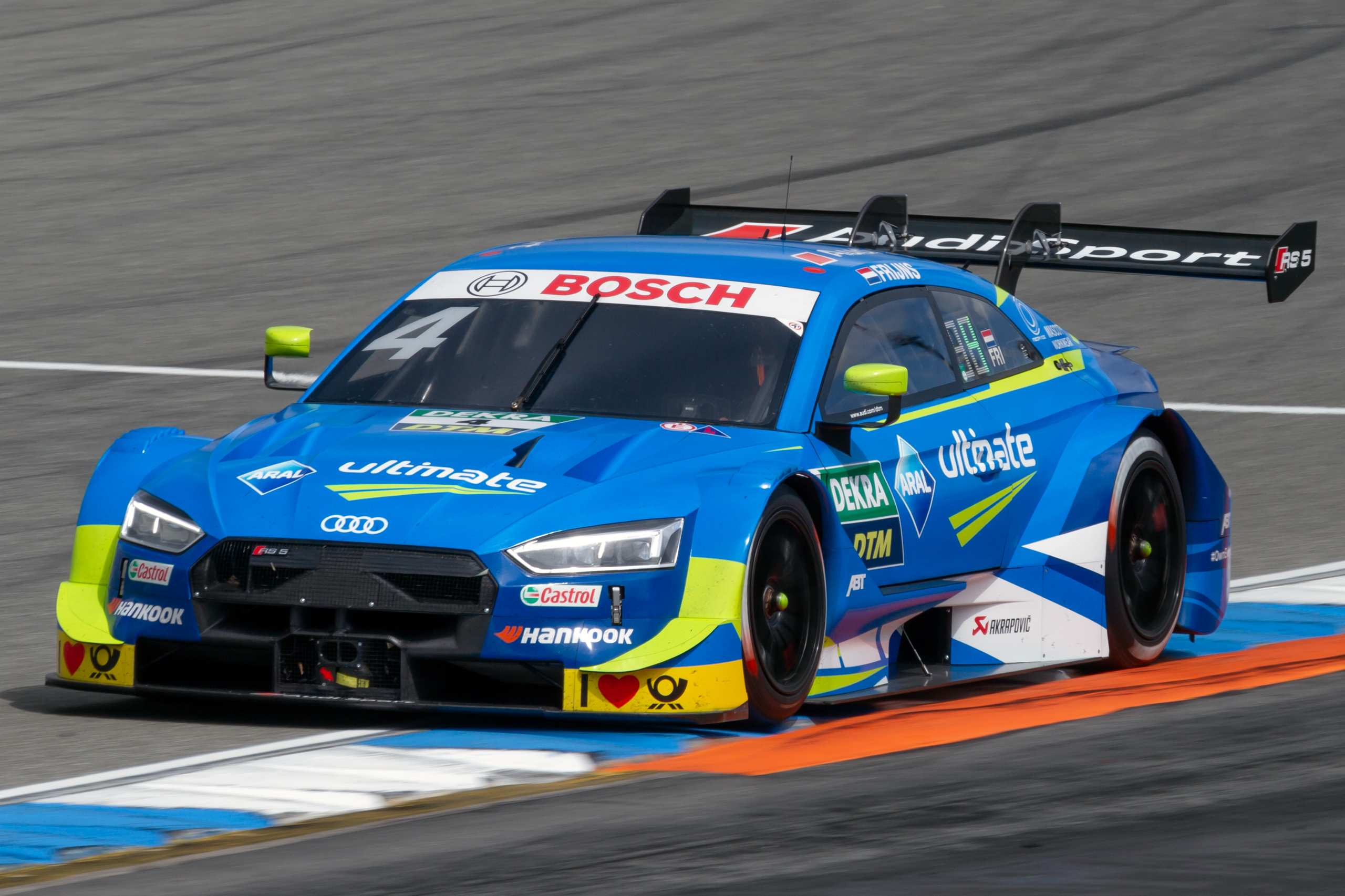
Frijns in DTM

On 29 January 2018, it was announced that Frijns would drive for Audi Sport in the Deutsche Tourenwagen Masters, replacing Mattias Ekström, who elected to focus solely on the FIA World Rallycross Championship.

==== 2019 ====
Frijns partnered Nico Müller for the 2019 season at Audi Sport Team Abt Sportsline & finished fifth overall in the drivers championship down to his consistency more than results, having stood on the podium five times without a win.

==== 2020 ====
In 2020, Frijns stayed at Audi Sport Team Abt Sportsline once again partnering Nico Müller. The 2020 season was his most successful season as of yet and saw Frijns take his maiden win in the DTM at his home circuit in Assen. He took a further two wins and ten podiums to finish the season in third position right behind his teammate. At the end of the season, Audi decided to end its official engagement in the DTM which resulted in Frijns leaving the championship.

== Endurance racing career ==
=== FIA World Endurance Championship (2021–present) ===
==== 2021 ====
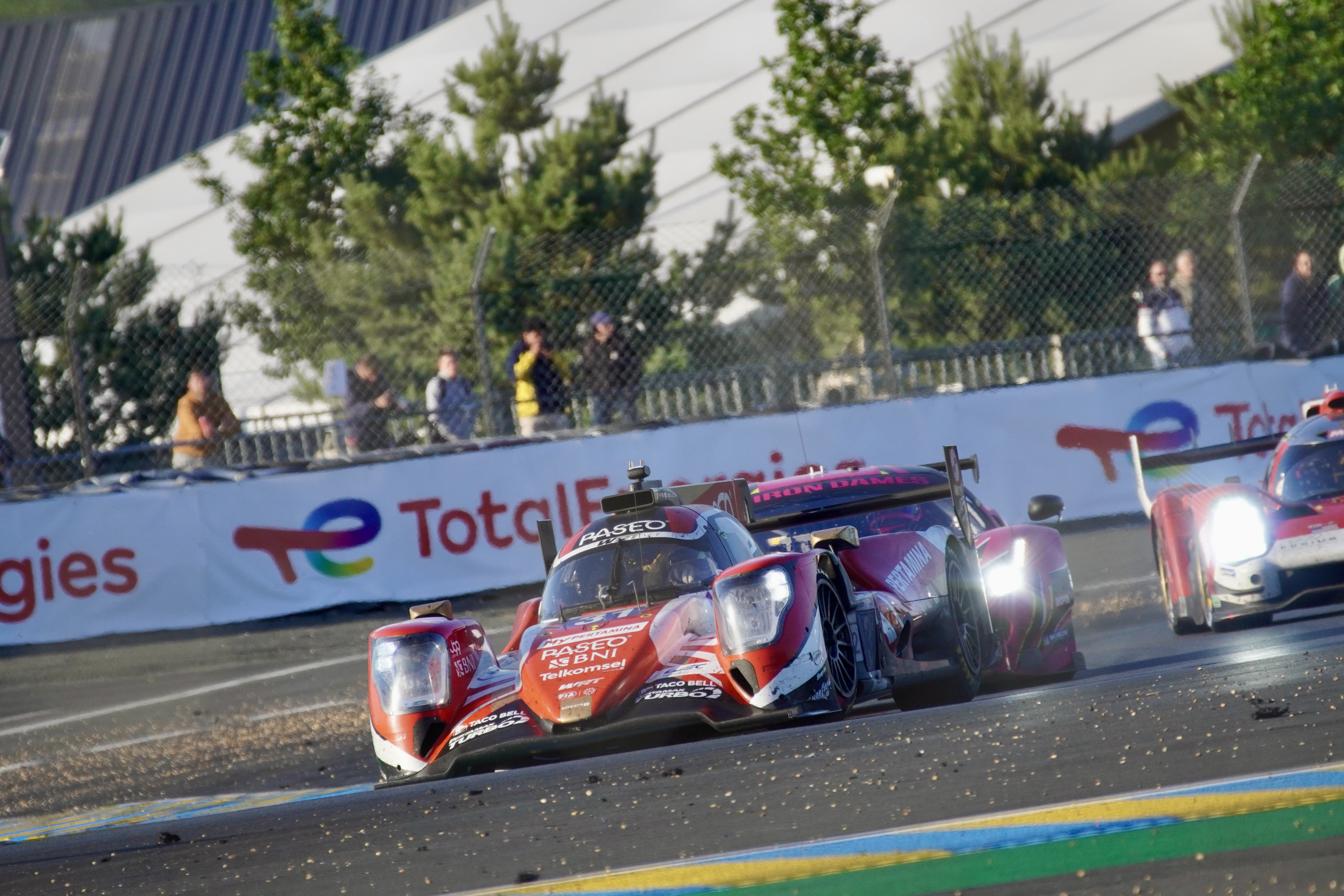
#31 Oreca 07 from Team WRT driven by Robin Frijns, Rene Rast and Sean Gelael

On 21 January 2021, Team WRT announced it would enter an Oreca 07 in the FIA World Endurance Championship with Robin Frijns as one of its drivers. It was later announced he would share the car with Charles Milesi and Ferdinand Habsburg. After a difficult first race the team won the three last races, including the 2021 24 Hours of Le Mans, claiming the World Championship on their debut. Frijns was at the wheel of the car at the 24 Hours of Le Mans when the sister car stopped on the final lap while leading the race. He subsequently inherited the lead and was able to fend off the chasing Oreca 07 from Tom Blomqvist and win the race by just over seven tenths of a second.

==== 2022 ====
For the 2022 season, Frijns remained at Team WRT, partnering Rene Rast and Sean Gelael. The season started out strongly, as after a second place in the 1000 Miles of Sebring Frijns and his teammates won the 6 Hours of Spa-Francorchamps, taking the championship lead in the process. However, despite the Dutchman taking pole for the 24 Hours of Le Mans at the following round, the team would be forced to retire from the race after Frijns crashed during the 18th hour. Another setback came at the subsequent 6 Hours of Monza, as a twelfth place meant that the team once again would miss out on points. Despite a strong end to the season, in which Frijns and his comrades took victories at Fuji, where Frijns experienced an issue with the team radio during the second part of the race, meaning that he couldn't communicate with his engineer, and Bahrain, the point-less middle part of the campaign meant that the team missed out on the championship to Jota, finishing second in the standings.

==== 2023 ====
Frijns was retained by Team WRT for the 2023 season alongside Ferdinand Habsburg and Sean Gelael again. A luckless season followed, as the trio lost out on a podium at the 24 Hours of Le Mans due to a suspension problem, gave up victory at Monza due to a rare failure of the Gibson engine, and had to settle for second in Bahrain, where a wheel gun issue at the final stop dropped Frijns to second - behind the title-winning sister car. Frijns, Habsburg, and Gelael ended up fourth in the championship by year's end.

== Racing record ==
=== Racing career summary ===
Season	Series	Team	Races	Wins	Poles	F/Laps	Podiums	Points	Position
2009	Formula BMW Europe	Josef Kaufmann Racing	16	1	1	1	6	265	**3rd**
2010	Formula BMW Europe	Josef Kaufmann Racing	16	6	3	3	13	383	**1st**
2010	Formula Renault 2.0 NEC	Josef Kaufmann Racing	3	1	0	1	2	70	14th
2011	Eurocup Formula Renault 2.0	Josef Kaufmann Racing	14	5	1	0	9	245	**1st**
2011	Formula Renault 2.0 NEC	Josef Kaufmann Racing	12	1	1	2	7	238	4th
2012	Formula Renault 3.5 Series	Fortec Motorsport	17	3	4	1	8	189	**1st**
2013	GP2 Series	Hilmer Motorsport	10	1	0	0	2	47	15th
2013	Formula One	Sauber F1 Team	Test driver						
2014	Formula One	Caterham F1 Team	Test driver						
2015	Blancpain Sprint Series	Belgian Audi Club Team WRT	11	5	2	0	7	127	**2nd**
2015	Blancpain Endurance Series	Belgian Audi Club Team WRT	5	0	0	0	2	48	6th
2015	Blancpain GT Series	Belgian Audi Club Team WRT	19	5	2	0	9	175	**1st**
2015–16	Formula E	Amlin Andretti	10	0	0	0	1	45	12th
2016	Blancpain GT Series	Belgian Audi Club Team WRT	15	1	0	1	2	37	29th
2016	Blancpain GT Series Sprint Cup	Belgian Audi Club Team WRT	8	1	0	2	2	33	10th
2016	Blancpain GT Series Endurance Cup	Belgian Audi Club Team WRT	5	0	0	0	0	4	42nd
2016	ADAC GT Masters	kfzteile24 APR Motorsport	2	0	0	0	0	0	NC
2016	Intercontinental GT Challenge	Audi Sport Team Phoenix	1	1	0	0	1	25	7th
2016	24 Hours of Nürburgring - SP9	Audi Sport Team WRT	1	0	0	0	0	N/A	8th
2016–17	Formula E	MS Amlin Andretti	12	0	0	0	0	24	13th
2017	Blancpain GT Series Sprint Cup	Team WRT	8	2	1	0	4	82	**1st**
2017	Blancpain GT Series Endurance Cup	Team WRT	2	0	1	0	1	28	13th
2017	FIA GT World Cup	Team WRT	1	0	0	0	1	N/A	**2nd**
2017	Intercontinental GT Challenge	Jamec Pem Racing	1	0	0	0	0	8	12th
2017	Intercontinental GT Challenge	Belgian Audi Club Team WRT	1	0	0	0	0	8	12th
2017	24H Series - A6	Belgian Audi Club WRT							
2017	24 Hours of Nürburgring - SP9	Audi Sport Team WRT	1	0	0	0	1	N/A	**3rd**
2018	Deutsche Tourenwagen Masters	Audi Sport Team Abt Sportsline	20	0	0	1	2	84	13th
2018	Blancpain GT Series Sprint Cup	Belgian Audi Club Team WRT	6	0	0	1	0	13	15th
2018	Blancpain GT Series Endurance Cup	Belgian Audi Club Team WRT	3	0	0	0	0	14	29th
2018	Intercontinental GT Challenge	Audi Sport Team WRT	3	1	1	0	2	55	5th
2018	24 Hours of Nürburgring - SP9	Audi Sport Team WRT	1	0	0	0	0	N/A	DNF
2018	IMSA SportsCar Championship - Prototype	Jackie Chan DCR JOTA	1	0	0	0	0	20	55th
2018	FIA GT World Cup	Audi Sport Team WRT Speedstar	1	0	0	0	0	N/A	5th
2018	Stock Car Brasil	Full Time Bassani	1	0	0	0	0	0	NC†
2018–19	Formula E	Envision Virgin Racing	13	2	0	0	4	106	4th
2019	Deutsche Tourenwagen Masters	Audi Sport Team Abt Sportsline	18	0	0	3	5	157	5th
2019	Blancpain GT Series Endurance Cup	Audi Sport Team WRT	1	0	0	0	0	3	32nd
2019	Intercontinental GT Challenge	Audi Sport Team WRT	1	0	0	0	0	0	NC
2019–20	Formula E	Envision Virgin Racing	10	0	0	0	2	58	12th
2020	Deutsche Tourenwagen Masters	Audi Sport Team Abt Sportsline	18	3	5	1	11	279	**3rd**
2020–21	Formula E	Envision Virgin Racing	15	0	1	2	2	89	5th
2021	FIA World Endurance Championship - LMP2	Team WRT	6	3	1	1	4	151	**1st**
2021	24 Hours of Le Mans - LMP2	Team WRT	1	1	0	0	1	N/A	**1st**
2021	GT World Challenge Europe Endurance Cup	Belgian Audi Club Team WRT	3	0	0	0	1	41	8th
2021	Intercontinental GT Challenge	Audi Sport Team WRT	2	0	0	0	0	16	12th
2021	24 Hours of Nürburgring - SP9	Audi Sport Team Phoenix	1	0	0	0	0	N/A	DNF
2021–22	Formula E	Envision Racing	16	0	0	2	4	126	7th
2022	FIA World Endurance Championship - LMP2	WRT	6	3	1	1	4	116	**2nd**
2022	24 Hours of Le Mans - LMP2	WRT	1	0	1	0	0	N/A	DNF
2022	24 Hours of Nürburgring - SP9	Audi Sport Team Phoenix	1	1	0	0	1	N/A	**1st**
2022–23	Formula E	ABT CUPRA Formula E Team	12	0	1	0	0	6	22nd
2023	FIA World Endurance Championship - LMP2	Team WRT	7	0	0	1	2	94	4th
2023	24 Hours of Le Mans - LMP2	Team WRT	1	0	0	1	0	N/A	5th
2023–24	Formula E	Envision Racing	14	0	0	1	3	66	9th
2024	FIA World Endurance Championship - Hypercar	BMW M Team WRT	8	0	0	0	0	10	27th
2024	Intercontinental GT Challenge	Rowe Racing							
2024	GT World Challenge Europe Endurance Cup	Rowe Racing	0	0	0	0	0	0	NC
2024	24 Hours of Nürburgring - SP9	Rowe Racing	1	0	0	0	0	N/A	DNF
2024–25	Formula E	Envision Racing	16	0	0	0	0	23	19th
2025	FIA World Endurance Championship - Hypercar	BMW M Team WRT	7	0	0	0	1	37	15th
2025	IMSA SportsCar Championship - GTP	BMW M Team RLL	3	0	0	1	0	761	24th
2026	IMSA SportsCar Championship - GTP	BMW M Team WRT	3	0	0	0	2	956	18th
2026	FIA World Endurance Championship - Hypercar	BMW M Team WRT	8	1	0	0	2	81	5th
2026	Nürburgring Langstrecken-Serie - SP9	Schubert Motorsport							
2026	24 Hours of Nürburgring - SP9	Schubert Motorsport	1	0	0	0	0	N/A	7th

^{†} As Frijns was a guest driver, he was ineligible for points.

=== Complete Formula BMW Europe results ===
(key) (Races in bold indicate pole position; races in italics indicate fastest lap)

Year	Team	1	2	3	4	5	6	7	8	9	10	11	12	13	14	15	16	Pos	Points
2009	Josef Kaufmann Racing	CAT; 1; 4	CAT; 2; 4	**ZAN**; **1**; 2	ZAN; 2; 4	SIL; 1; 1	SIL; 2; 10	NÜR; 1; 3	NÜR; 2; 5	HUN; 1; 4	HUN; 2; 7	VAL; 1; 3	VAL; 2; 14	SPA; 1; 3	SPA; 2; 5	MNZ; 1; 3	MNZ; 2; 12	3rd	265
2010	Josef Kaufmann Racing	CAT; 1 Ret	CAT; 2; 1	ZAN; 1; 4	ZAN; 2; 1	VAL; 1; 4	VAL; 2; 2	SIL; 1; 2	SIL; 2; 2	**HOC**; **1**; 2	**HOC**; **2**; 1	**HUN**; **1**; 1	HUN; 2; 2	SPA; 1; 2	SPA; 2; 1	MNZ; 1; 1	MNZ; 2; 3	1st	383

=== Complete Formula Renault 2.0 NEC results ===
(key) (Races in bold indicate pole position; races in italics indicate fastest lap)

Year	Team	1	2	3	4	5	6	7	8	9	10	11	12	13	14	15	16	17	18	19	20	Pos	Points
2010	Josef Kaufmann Racing	HOC; 1	HOC; 2	BRN; 1	BRN; 2	ZAN; 1	ZAN; 2	OSC; 1	OSC; 2	OSC; 3	ASS; 1	ASS; 2	MST; 1	MST; 2	MST; 3	SPA; 1; 2	SPA; 2; 5	SPA; 3; 1	NÜR; 1	NÜR; 2	NÜR; 3	14th	70
2011	Josef Kaufmann Racing	HOC; 1; 2	HOC; 2; 2	HOC; 3; 3	**SPA**; **1**; 3	SPA; 2; 5	NÜR; 1; 2	NÜR; 2; 4	ASS; 1; 2	ASS; 2; 1	ASS; 3; 4	OSC; 1	OSC; 2	ZAN; 1 Ret	ZAN; 2; 7	MST; 1	MST; 2	MST; 3	MNZ; 1	MNZ; 2	MNZ; 3	4th	238

=== Complete Eurocup Formula Renault 2.0 results ===
(key) (Races in bold indicate pole position) (Races in italics indicate fastest lap)

Year	Entrant	1	2	3	4	5	6	7	8	9	10	11	12	13	14	Pos	Points
2011	Josef Kaufmann Racing	ALC; 1; 2	ALC; 2; 3	**SPA**; **1**; 3	SPA; 2; 5	NÜR; 1; 1	NÜR; 2; 5	HUN; 1; 1	HUN; 2; 2	SIL; 1; 1	SIL; 2; 1	LEC; 1; 4	LEC; 2; 1	CAT; 1; 4	CAT; 2; 5	1st	245

=== Complete Formula Renault 3.5 Series results ===
(key) (Races in bold indicate pole position; races in italics indicate fastest lap)

Year	Team	1	2	3	4	5	6	7	8	9	10	11	12	13	14	15	16	17	Pos	Points
2012	Fortec Motorsport	ALC; 1; 3	ALC; 2; 1	MON; 1 Ret	SPA; 1; 7	SPA; 2; 3	NÜR; 1; 3	**NÜR**; **2**; 5	**MSC**; **1**; 1	MSC; 2; 17	SIL; 1; 2	SIL; 2; 9	**HUN**; **1**; 1	**HUN**; **2**; 5	LEC; 1; 7	LEC; 2; 9	CAT; 1; 3	CAT; 2; 14	1st	189

=== Complete GP2 Series results ===
(key) (Races in bold indicate pole position; races in italics indicate fastest lap)

Year	Entrant	1	2	3	4	5	6	7	8	9	10	11	12	13	14	15	16	17	18	19	20	21	22	DC	Points
2013	Hilmer Motorsport	SEP; FEA	SEP; SPR	BHR; FEA; 21	BHR; SPR; 23	CAT; FEA; 1	CAT; SPR; 2	MON; FEA; Ret	MON; SPR; 15	SIL; FEA; 13	SIL; SPR; Ret	NÜR; FEA; 6	NÜR; SPR; Ret	HUN; FEA	HUN; SPR	SPA; FEA; 9	SPA; SPR; Ret	MNZ; FEA	MNZ; SPR	MRN; FEA	MRN; SPR	YMC; FEA	YMC; SPR	15th	47

=== Complete Formula One participations ===
(key) (Races in bold indicate pole position; races in italics indicates fastest lap)

Year	Entrant	Chassis	Engine	1	2	3	4	5	6	7	8	9	10	11	12	13	14	15	16	17	18	19	WDC	Points
2014	Caterham F1 Team	Caterham CT05	Renault Energy F1‑2014 1.6 V6 t	AUS	MAL	BHR; TD	CHN	ESP	MON	CAN	AUT	GBR; TD	GER	HUN	BEL	ITA	SIN	JPN	RUS	USA	BRA	ABU	-	-

=== Complete GT World Challenge Europe results ===
(key) (Races in bold indicate pole position; races in italics indicate fastest lap)

Year	Team	Car	Class	1	2	3	4	5	6	7	8	9	10	11	12	13	14	15	16	17	18	19	20	21	Pos.	Points
2015	Belgian Audi Club Team WRT	Audi R8 LMS Ultra	GT3	NOG; QR; DNS	NOG; CR; DNS	MNZ; CR; 3	**BRH**; **QR**; 1	BRH; CR; 1	SIL; CR; 2	**ZOL**; **QR**; 1	ZOL; CR; 1	LEC; QR; 34	MSC; QR; Ret	MSC; CR; 5	SPA; 6hrs 50	SPA; 12hrs 43	SPA; 24hrs Ret	ALG; QR; 2	ALG; CR; 1	NÜR; CR; 4	MIS; QR; Ret	MIS; CR; DNS	ZAN; QR; 15	ZAN; CR; 2	1st	170
2016	Belgian Audi Club Team WRT	Audi R8 LMS Ultra	GT3	MIS; QR; 4	MIS; MR; 22	MNZ; 33	BRH; QR; 6	BRH; MR; 12	SIL; 13	LEC; Ret	NÜR; QR	NÜR; MR	SPA; 6hrs 19	SPA; 12hrs 11	SPA; 24hrs Ret	HUN; QR; 11	HUN; MR; 7	NÜR; 8	CAT; QR; 1	CAT; MR; 3					29th	37

==== GT World Challenge Europe Sprint Cup ====
Year	Team	Car	Class	1	2	3	4	5	6	7	8	9	10	11	12	13	14	Pos.	Points
2015	Belgian Audi Club Team WRT	Audi R8 LMS Ultra	Pro	NOG; QR; DNS	NOG; CR; DNS	**BRH**; **QR**; 1	BRH; CR; 1	**ZOL**; **QR**; 1	ZOL; CR; 1	MOS; QR; Ret	MOS; CR; 5	ALG; QR; 2	ALG; CR; 1	MIS; QR; Ret	MIS; CR; DNS	ZAN; QR; 15	ZAN; CR; 2	2nd	127
2016	Belgian Audi Club Team WRT	Audi R8 LMS	Pro	MIS; QR; 4	MIS; CR; 22	BRH; QR; 6	BRH; CR; 12	NÜR; QR	NÜR; CR	HUN; QR; 11	HUN; CR; 7	CAT; QR; 1	CAT; CR; 3					10th	33
2017	Team WRT	Audi R8 LMS	Pro	MIS; QR	MIS; CR	BRH; QR; 7	BRH; CR; 2	**ZOL**; **QR**; 1	ZOL; CR; 3	HUN; QR; 5	HUN; CR; 4	NÜR; QR; 6	NÜR; CR; 1					1st	82
2018	Belgian Audi Club Team WRT	Audi R8 LMS	Pro	ZOL; 1; 5	ZOL; 2; 5	BRH; 1	BRH; 2	MIS; 1	MIS; 2	HUN; 1 Ret	HUN; 2; 16	NÜR; 1; 11	NÜR; 2; 9					15th	13

==== GT World Challenge Europe Endurance Cup ====
Year	Team	Car	Class	1	2	3	4	5	6	7	Pos.	Points
2015	Belgian Audi Club Team WRT	Audi R8 LMS ultra	Pro	MNZ; 3	SIL; 2	LEC; 34	SPA; 6H; 50	SPA; 12H; 43	SPA; 24H; Ret	NÜR; 4	6th	48
2016	Belgian Audi Club Team WRT	Audi R8 LMS	Pro	MNZ; 33	SIL; 13	LEC; Ret	SPA; 6H; 19	SPA; 12H; 11	SPA; 24H; Ret	NÜR; 8	42nd	4
2017	Belgian Audi Club Team WRT	Audi R8 LMS	Pro	MNZ	SIL	LEC; 6	SPA; 6H	SPA; 12H	SPA; 24H	CAT; 2	13th	28
2018	Belgian Audi Club Team WRT	Audi R8 LMS	Pro	MNZ; 7	SIL	LEC				CAT; Ret	29th	14
2018	Audi Sport Team WRT	Audi R8 LMS	Pro				SPA; 6H; 6	SPA; 12H; 10	SPA; 24H; 8		29th	14
2019	Audi Sport Team WRT	Audi R8 LMS Evo	Pro	MNZ	SIL	LEC	SPA; 6H; 9	SPA; 12H; 8	SPA; 24H; 23	CAT	32nd	3
2021	Audi Sport Team WRT	Audi R8 LMS Evo	Pro	MON	LEC	SPA; 6H; 7	SPA; 12H; 7	SPA; 24H; 4	NÜR; 6	CAT; 3	8th	41
2024	Rowe Racing	BMW M4 GT3	Pro	LEC	SPA; 6H	SPA; 12H	SPA; 24H	NÜR	MNZ; WD	JED	NC	0

=== Complete Formula E results ===
(key) (Races in bold indicate pole position; races in italics indicate fastest lap)

Year	Team	Chassis	Powertrain	1	2	3	4	5	6	7	8	9	10	11	12	13	14	15	16	Pos	Points
2015–16	Amlin Andretti	Spark SRT01-e	SRT01-e	BEI; 10	PUT; 3	PDE; 10	BUE; 8	MEX; 5	LBH; 15	PAR; 7	BER; 6	LDN; Ret	LDN; Ret							12th	45
2016–17	MS Amlin Andretti	Spark SRT01-e	Andretti ATEC-02	HKG; 6	MRK; 11	BUE; 14	MEX; 11	MCO; 12	PAR; 6	BER; 17	BER; 18	NYC; 9	NYC; 9	MTL; 8	MTL; 13					13th	24
2018–19	Envision Virgin Racing	Spark SRT05e	Audi e-tron FE05	ADR; 12	MRK; 2	SCL; 5	MEX; 11	HKG; 3	SYX; 14	RME; 4	PAR; 1	MCO; 17†	BER; 13	BRN; Ret	NYC; Ret	NYC; 1				4th	106
2019–20	Envision Virgin Racing	Spark SRT05e	Audi e-tron FE06	DIR; 5	DIR; Ret	SCL; 15	MEX; DSQ	MRK; 12	BER; Ret	BER; 4	BER; 2	BER; DNS	BER; 2	BER; Ret						12th	58
2020–21	Envision Virgin Racing	Spark SRT05e	Audi e-tron FE07	DIR; 17	**DIR**; 2	RME; 4	RME; 18	VLC; 6	VLC; 19	MCO; 2	PUE; 16	PUE; 11	NYC; 5	NYC; 8	LDN; 13	LDN; 4	BER; 15	BER; 12		5th	89
2021–22	Envision Racing	Spark SRT05e	Audi e-tron FE07	DRH; 16	DRH; 2	MEX; 7	RME; 2	RME; 3	MCO; 4	BER; 12	BER; 5	JAK; 17	MRK; 18	NYC; 3	NYC; 6	LDN; 16	LDN; 7	SEO; 8	SEO; 4	7th	126
2022–23	ABT CUPRA Formula E Team	Formula E Gen3	Mahindra M9Electro	MEX; Ret	DRH	DRH	HYD	CAP	SAP; 14	BER; 14	**BER**; 17	MCO; 13	JAK; 9	JAK; 13	POR; 10	RME; Ret	RME; Ret	LDN; Ret	LDN; 17	22nd	6
2023–24	Envision Racing	Formula E Gen3	Jaguar I-Type 6	MEX; Ret	DRH; 10	DRH; 2	SAP; 18	TOK; 9	MIS; 17	MIS; Ret	MCO; 17	BER	BER	SIC; 12	SIC; 9	POR; 2	POR; 2	LDN; Ret	LDN; 7	9th	66
2024–25	Envision Racing	Formula E Gen3 Evo	Jaguar I-Type 7	SAO; DNS	MEX; 11	JED; 13	JED; 14	MIA; 8	MCO; 8	MCO; 11	TKO; 9	TKO; 16	SHA; 10	SHA; 8	JKT; 9	BER; 13	BER; Ret	LDN; 7	LDN; 13	19th	23

^{†} Driver did not finish the race, but was classified as he completed over 90% of the race distance. ^{*} Season still in progress.

=== Complete ADAC GT Masters results ===
(key) (Races in bold indicate pole position) (Races in italics indicate fastest lap)

Year	Team	Car	1	2	3	4	5	6	7	8	9	10	11	12	13	14	Pos	Points
2016	kfzteile24 APR Motorsport	Audi R8 LMS	OSC; 1	OSC; 2	SAC; 1	SAC; 2	LAU; 1; 13	LAU; 2; 23	RBR; 1	RBR; 2	NÜR; 1	NÜR; 2	ZAN; 1	ZAN; 2	HOC; 1	HOC; 2	NC	0

=== Complete Intercontinental GT Challenge results ===
Year	Team	Car	Class	1	2	3	4	5	Pos.	Points
2016	Belgian Audi Club Team WRT	R8 LMS	Pro	BAT	SPA	SEP; 1			7th	25
2017	Jamec Pec Racing	R8 LMS	Pro	BAT; Ret	SPA				12th	8
2017	Belgian Audi Club Team WRT	R8 LMS	Pro			LGA; 6			12th	8
2018	Audi Sport Team WRT	R8 LMS	Pro	BAT; 1	**SPA**; 4	SUZ	LGA; 2		5th	55
2019	Audi Sport Team WRT	R8 LMS (2019)	Pro	BAT	LGA	SPA; 14	SUZ	KYA	NC	0
2021	Belgian Audi Club Team WRT	R8 LMS Evo	Pro	SPA; 3	IND; 10	KYA			16th	16
2024	Rowe Racing	M4 GT3	Pro	BAT	NÜR; Ret	SPA	IND		NC	0

=== Complete 24 Hours of Nürburgring results ===
Year	Team	Co-Drivers	Car	Class	Laps	Ovr. Pos.	Class Pos.
2016	(Belgium) Team WRT	(United Kingdom) Stuart Leonard (Sweden) Edward Sandström (Belgium) Frédéric Vervisch	Audi R8 LMS	SP9	130	8th	8th
2017	(Belgium) Team WRT	(Switzerland) Nico Müller (Switzerland) Marcel Fässler (Germany) René Rast	Audi R8 LMS	SP9	158	**3rd**	**3rd**
2018	(Belgium) Team WRT	(Germany) René Rast (Belgium) Dries Vanthoor (South Africa) Kelvin van der Linde	Audi R8 LMS	SP9	36	DNF	DNF
2021	(Germany) Phoenix Racing	(Italy) Mattia Drudi (Germany) Frank Stippler (Belgium) Dries Vanthoor	Audi R8 LMS Evo	SP9	17	DNF	DNF
2022	(Germany) Phoenix Racing	(South Africa) Kelvin van der Linde (Belgium) Dries Vanthoor (Belgium) Frédéric Vervisch	Audi R8 LMS Evo II	SP9 Pro	159	**1st**	**1st**
2024	(Germany) Rowe Racing	(Brazil) Augusto Farfus (South Africa) Sheldon van der Linde (Belgium) Dries Vanthoor	BMW M4 GT3	SP9 Pro	21	DNF	DNF
2026	(Germany) Schubert Motorsport	(Austria) Philipp Eng (Belgium) Charles Weerts (Germany) Marco Wittmann	BMW M4 GT3 Evo	SP9 Pro	154	8th	7th

=== Complete Bathurst 12 Hour results ===
Year	Car#	Team	Co-Drivers	Car	Class	Laps	Pos.	Class Pos.
2018	37	(Belgium) Audi Sport Team WRT	(United Kingdom) Stuart Leonard (Belgium) Dries Vanthoor	Audi R8 LMS	APP	271	**1st**	**1st**

=== Complete IMSA SportsCar Championship results ===
(key) (Races in bold indicate pole position) (Races in italics indicate fastest lap)

Year	Entrant	Class	Chassis	Engine	1	2	3	4	5	6	7	8	9	10	Rank	Points
2018	Jackie Chan DCR JOTA	P	Oreca 07	Gibson GK428 4.2 L V8	DAY; 11	SEB	LBH	MDO	DET	WGL	MOS	ELK	LGA	PET	55th	20
2025	BMW M Team RLL	GTP	BMW M Hybrid V8	BMW P66/3 4.0 L Turbo V8	DAY; 7	SEB; 5	LBH	LGA	DET	WGL	ELK	IMS	PET; 11		24th	761
2026	BMW M Team WRT	GTP	BMW M Hybrid V8	BMW P66/3 4.0 L Turbo V8	DAY; 3	SEB; 5	LBH	LGA	DET	WGL	ELK	IMS	PET; 2		18th	956

=== Complete Stock Car Pro Series results ===
(key) (Races in bold indicate pole position; results in italics indicate fastest lap)

Year	Team	Car	1	2	3	4	5	6	7	8	9	10	11	12	13	14	15	16	17	18	19	20	21	Rank	Points
2018	Full Time Bassani	Chevrolet Cruze	INT; 1 Ret	CUR; 1	CUR; 2	VEL; 1	VEL; 2	LON; 1	LON; 2	SCZ; 1	SCZ; 2	GOI; 1	MOU; 1	MOU; 2	CAS; 1	CAS; 2	VCA; 1	VCA; 2	TAR; 1	TAR; 2	GOI; 1	GOI; 2	INT; 1	NC†	0

^{†} As Frijns was a guest driver, he was ineligible to score points.

=== Complete Deutsche Tourenwagen Masters results ===
(key) (Races in bold indicate pole position) (Races in italics indicate fastest lap)

Year	Team	Car	1	2	3	4	5	6	7	8	9	10	11	12	13	14	15	16	17	18	19	20	Pos	Points
2018	Audi Sport Team Abt Sportsline	Audi RS5 DTM	HOC; 1; 18	HOC; 2; 12	LAU; 1; 13	LAU; 2; 10	HUN; 1; 7	HUN; 2; 8	NOR; 1; 12	NOR; 2; 8	ZAN; 1; 5	ZAN; 2 Ret	BRH; 1; 12	BRH; 2; 12	MIS; 1; 2	MIS; 2; 4	NÜR; 1; 17	NÜR; 2; 10	SPL; 1; 11	SPL; 2; 13	HOC; 1; 2	HOC; 2; 5	13th	84
2019	Audi Sport Team Abt Sportsline	Audi RS5 Turbo DTM	HOC; 1; 3	HOC; 2; 3	ZOL; 1; 12	ZOL; 2 Ret	MIS; 1 Ret	MIS; 2; 4	NOR; 1 Ret	NOR; 2; 4	ASS; 1 Ret	ASS; 2; 6	BRH; 1; 4	BRH; 2; 3	LAU; 1; 2	LAU; 2; 5	NÜR; 1 DSQ	NÜR; 2; 2	HOC; 1; 4	HOC; 2; 7			5th	157
2020	Audi Sport Team Abt Sportsline	Audi RS5 Turbo DTM	**SPA**; **1**; 9	SPA; 2; 2	**LAU**; **1**; 3	**LAU**; **2**; 4	LAU; 1; 3	**LAU**; **2**; 3	ASS; 1; 1	ASS; 2; 2	NÜR; 1; 5	NÜR; 2; 1	NÜR; 1; 1	**NÜR**; **2**; 2	ZOL; 1; 2	ZOL; 2 Ret	ZOL; 1; 2	ZOL; 2 Ret	HOC; 1; 7	HOC; 2; 5			3rd	279

=== Complete FIA World Endurance Championship results ===
(key) (Races in bold indicate pole position) (Races in italics indicate fastest lap)

Year	Entrant	Class	Chassis	Engine	1	2	3	4	5	6	7	8	Rank	Points
2021	Team WRT	LMP2	Oreca 07	Gibson GK428 4.2 L V8	SPA; 10	ALG; 4	**MNZ**; 2	LMS; 1	BHR; 1	BHR; 1			1st	151
2022	Team WRT	LMP2	Oreca 07	Gibson GK428 4.2 L V8	SEB; 2	SPA; 1	**LMS**; Ret	MNZ; 12	FUJ; 1	BHR; 1			2nd	116
2023	Team WRT	LMP2	Oreca 07	Gibson GK428 4.2 L V8	SEB; 6	ALG; 6	SPA; 6	LMS; 4	MNZ; Ret	FUJ; 3	BHR; 2		4th	94
2024	BMW M Team WRT	Hypercar	BMW M Hybrid V8	BMW P66/3 4.0 L Turbo V8	QAT; 10	IMO; 6	SPA; 13	LMS; NC	SÃO; 14	COA; 13	FUJ; Ret	BHR; Ret	27th	10
2025	BMW M Team WRT	Hypercar	BMW M Hybrid V8	BMW P66/3 4.0 L Turbo V8	QAT; 7	IMO; 2	SPA; Ret	LMS; 16	SÃO	COA; NC	FUJ; 8	BHR; 8	15th	37
2026	BMW M Team WRT	Hypercar	BMW M Hybrid V8	BMW P66/3 4.0 L Turbo V8	IMO; 5	SPA; 1	LMS; 2	SÃO; 8	COA; 12	FUJ; 13	CAT; 14	MNZ; 7	5th	81

=== Complete 24 Hours of Le Mans results ===
Year	Team	Co-Drivers	Car	Class	Laps	Pos.	Class Pos.
2021	(Belgium) Team WRT	(France) Charles Milesi (Austria) Ferdinand Habsburg	Oreca 07-Gibson	LMP2	363	6th	**1st**
2022	(Belgium) Team WRT	(Indonesia) Sean Gelael (Germany) René Rast	Oreca 07-Gibson	LMP2	285	DNF	DNF
2023	(Belgium) Team WRT	(Indonesia) Sean Gelael (Austria) Ferdinand Habsburg	Oreca 07-Gibson	LMP2	327	13th	5th
2024	(Belgium) BMW M Team WRT	(Germany) René Rast (South Africa) Sheldon van der Linde	BMW M Hybrid V8	Hypercar	96	NC	NC
2025	(Germany) BMW M Team WRT	(Germany) René Rast (South Africa) Sheldon van der Linde	BMW M Hybrid V8	Hypercar	375	17th	17th
2026	(Germany) BMW M Team WRT	(Germany) René Rast (South Africa) Sheldon van der Linde	BMW M Hybrid V8	Hypercar	381	**2nd**	**2nd**

Sporting positions
Preceded by Felipe Nasr	Formula BMW Europe champion 2010	Succeeded by None (Series ended)
Preceded by Kevin Korjus	Eurocup Formula Renault 2.0; Champion; 2011	Succeeded by Stoffel Vandoorne
Preceded by Robert Wickens	Formula Renault 3.5 Series champion 2012	Succeeded by Kevin Magnussen
Preceded by Laurens Vanthoor	Blancpain GT Series champion 2015	Succeeded by Dominik Baumann; Maximilian Buhk
Preceded by Enzo Ide	Blancpain GT Series Sprint Cup champion 2017; With: Stuart Leonard	Succeeded by Raffaele Marciello; Michael Meadows
Preceded by Craig Lowndes; Toni Vilander; Jamie Whincup	Winner of the Bathurst 12 Hour; 2018; With: Stuart Leonard & Dries Vanthoor	Succeeded by Matt Campbell; Dennis Olsen; Dirk Werner
Preceded by Filipe Albuquerque; Phil Hanson	FIA Endurance Trophy for LMP2 Drivers; 2021; With: Ferdinand Habsburg & Charles Milesi	Succeeded by António Félix da Costa; Will Stevens; Roberto González
