= Raoul Owens =

British racing driver (born 1994)

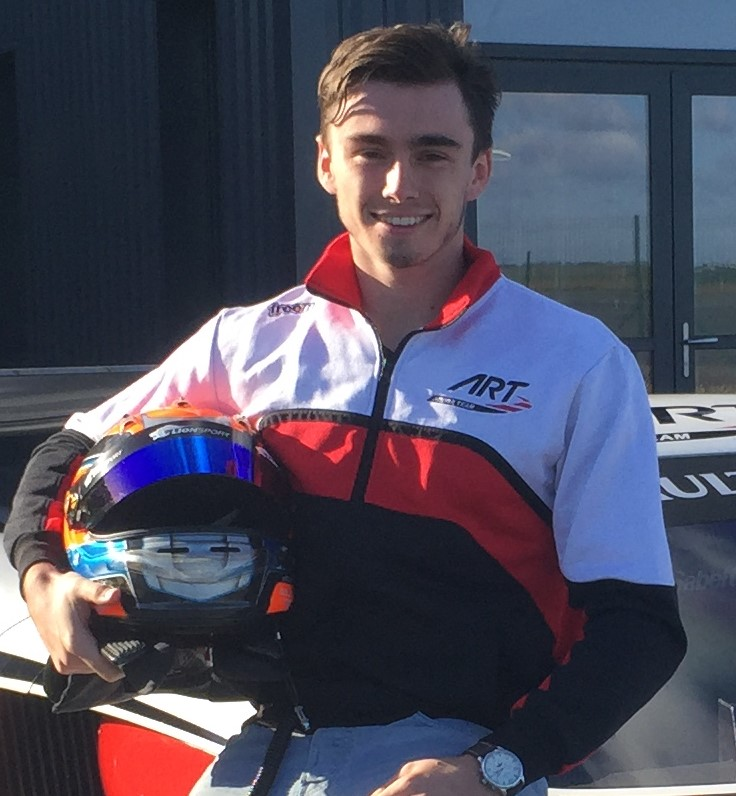
- Raoul Owens in February 2016
- Nationality: British
- Born: 22 August 1994 (age 32) Pembury, Kent, England

VLN Endurance Championship career
- Debut season: 2017
- Current team: Walkenhorst Motorsport BMW
- Car number: N/A
- Former teams: R-ace GP, Team Pelfrey, Mark Burdett Motorsport
- Starts: 3
- Wins: 1
- Podiums: 1
- Fastest laps: 0

Previous series
- 2016 2015 2014 2013 2012 2011: Renault Sport Trophy; Pro Mazda Championship; Formula Renault 2.0 NEC; Formula Renault 2.0 NEC; Formula Renault BARC; Formula Renault BARC

Raoul Owens (born 22 August 1994) is a British racing driver based in London. He will compete in the VLN Endurance Championship based at the Nürburgring with Walkenhorst Motorsport BMW.

== Career ==
=== Early years ===
It was in the UK at the age of eight that, Owens began competing in karting. Shortly after, in 2005, with the family move to South Africa, he continued his early development by joining the Western Province Motoring Club. By the following year, Owens had his first substantial milestone, winning the Mini Max Regional Championship.

In 2009, Owens moved up to the South African Northern Region where he was able to race alongside sterner competition at circuits that included Zwartkops Raceway and Vereeniging. The reward was to end the season as Vice Champion in the Junior Max Vice Championship, as well in the Rotax SARMC National Series – all in his inaugural year. As a result, he was eligible to compete in the season's highlight event, the Rotax Grand Finals held in Egypt. Simultaneously the same year, Owens was to be seen competing in Europe, this time in the Rotax European Max Series. This proved a huge success, with Raoul being ranked 8th in a field of 50 other drivers. 2010 was also busy, with Owens competing solely on the international stage in the Euro Max Challenge Series at leading circuits in Europe, as well as in the UK in the 'Super1' National Series.

=== Formula Renault BARC ===
2011 saw the biggest step up in class for Owens, as he advanced to Europe's highest rated open-wheel category at this level, Formula Renault BARC. Consequently, Owens was to compete for two years at some of the most iconic UK tracks including Donington Park, Thruxton, Snetterton, Croft, Brands Hatch and Silverstone – showcasing to crowds of up to 40,000. In the 2012 season, he also competed in one-off competitions at Spa-Francorchamps, Magny-Cours and Le Mans. This year ended with an overall top-ten finish.

=== Formula Renault Northern European Cup NEC ===
In 2013, Owens embarked on a programme in mainland Europe with Mark Burdett Motorsport within the ranks of Formula Renault 2.0 Northern European Cup, racing in the hotly contested Northern European Cup (NEC) and increasing his exposure to the prestigious World Series by Renault (WSR) Formula Renault 2.0 category in 2014. To consolidate his skills in 2014, in addition to competing again in the Northern European Cup, Owens competed in selected WSR events under wild cards. During this period, he worked with chief race engineer, Andy Miller – veteran of Formula One team Stewart GP.

=== Mazda Road To Indy ===
In 2015, Owens relocated to Boston, USA to compete in the Mazda Road To Indy series in the Pro Mazda Championship. The Mazda Road To Indy series forms part of the support to the INDYCAR race calendar. He initially joined JDC Motorsports for six races. Following this, Owens joined the Florida-based Pro Mazda Championship Team Pelfrey. The Pro Mazda category is part of the Road To Indy, which is the feeder series for IndyCar competition. His first race was in the 2015 Pro Mazda Winterfest series in advance of his debut in the Pro Mazda Championship.

Owens' first foray in to the US was noteworthy for the number of in race accolades he won throughout the year, including the Quartermaster Hard Charger Award for most overtakes in a race at the Barber Motorsports Park.

=== RENAULT RS01 Trophy ===
2016 saw Owens return to Europe to make the change and crossover in to GT Racing. He has joined the leading R-ace GP team competing in the 2016 Renault Sport Trophy in the new RS01 race car. The races are part of the World Series by Renault and support the European Le Mans Series.

Owens ended the season with a creditable top-ten position in this, the final year, of the 2016 Renault Sport Trophy.

=== 2017 VLN Endurance Series, ADAC Qualifying Race 24HR Nürburgring and ADAC Zurich 24HR Race ===
Owens competed in select rounds of the VLN Endurance Championship in 2017, along with the ADAC Qualifying Race 24h Nürburgring and the ADAC Zurich 24-Hour race. He scored a best finish of fourth in the VLN at the ninth round of the championship; finished third at the ADAC Qualifying Race 24h Nürburgring. Unfortunately, he failed to finish the ADAC Zurich 24-Hour race after running as high as second place.

== Statistics ==
=== Complete Formula Renault 2.0 NEC results ===
(key) (Races in bold indicate pole position) (Races in italics indicate fastest lap)

Year	Entrant	1	2	3	4	5	6	7	8	9	10	11	12	13	14	15	16	17	18	19	20	DC	Points
2012	Manor MP Motorsport	HOC; 1	HOC; 2	HOC; 3	NÜR; 1	NÜR; 2	OSC; 1	OSC; 2	OSC; 3	ASS; 1	ASS; 2	RBR; 1	RBR; 2	MST; 1	MST; 2	MST; 3	ZAN; 1	ZAN; 2	ZAN; 3	SPA; 1; 19	SPA; 2; 33	48th	2
2013	Mark Burdett Racing	HOC; 1; 13	HOC; 2; 15	HOC; 3; 15	NÜR; 1 Ret	NÜR; 2; 19	SIL; 1; 12	SIL; 2; 21	SPA; 1; 4	SPA; 2; 3	ASS; 1; 8	ASS; 2; 7	MST; 1; 9	MST; 2; 14	MST; 3; 9	ZAN; 1; 20	ZAN; 2 Ret	ZAN; 3 C				9th	127
2014	Mark Burdett Racing	MNZ; 1; 8	MNZ; 2; 9	SIL; 1; 7	SIL; 2; 20	HOC; 1 NC	HOC; 2; 10	HOC; 3; 12	SPA; 1; 11	SPA; 2 Ret	ASS; 1 Ret	ASS; 2; 12	MST; 1; 15	**MST**; **2**; 2	MST; 3 C	NÜR; 1; 12	NÜR; 2; 14	NÜR; 3 C				10th	125

=== Complete Eurocup Formula Renault 2.0 results ===
(key) (Races in bold indicate pole position; races in italics indicate fastest lap)

Year	Entrant	1	2	3	4	5	6	7	8	9	10	11	12	13	14	DC	Points
2013	Mark Burdett Racing	ALC; 1	ALC; 2	SPA; 1	SPA; 2	MSC; 1	MSC; 2	RBR; 1	RBR; 2	HUN; 1	HUN; 2	LEC; 1	LEC; 2	CAT; 1; 16	CAT; 2; 18	NC†	0
2014	Mark Burdett Racing	ALC; 1	ALC; 2	SPA; 1; 27	SPA; 2; 24	MSC; 1	MSC; 2	NÜR; 1; 17	NÜR; 2; 26	HUN; 1	HUN; 2	LEC; 1	LEC; 2	JER; 1	JER; 2	NC†	0

† As Owens was a guest driver, he was ineligible for points

=== Complete Formula Renault 2.0 Alps Series results ===
(key) (Races in bold indicate pole position; races in italics indicate fastest lap)

Year	Team	1	2	3	4	5	6	7	8	9	10	11	12	13	14	Pos	Points
2014	Mark Burdett Motorsport	IMO; 1	IMO; 2	PAU; 1	PAU; 2	RBR; 1	RBR; 2	SPA; 1 Ret	SPA; 2; 5	MNZ; 1	MNZ; 2	MUG; 1	MUG; 2	JER; 1	JER; 2	NC†	0

† As Owens was a guest driver, he was ineligible for points

=== Pro Mazda Championship ===
Year	Team	1	2	3	4	5	6	7	8	9	10	11	12	13	14	15	16	17	Rank	Points
2015	JDC Motorsports	STP; 6	STP; 10	LOU; 12	LOU; C	BAR; 6	BAR; 11												**12th**	**159**
2015	Team Pelfrey							IMS; 18	IMS; 11	IMS; 12	LOR; 14	TOR; 8	TOR; 6	IOW; 12	MOH; 13	MOH; 13	LAG; 7	LAG; 16	**12th**	**159**

=== Renault Sport Trophy - Endurance Class 2016 ===
Pos.	Driver	ALC (Spain)	IMO (Italy)	RBR (Austria)	CPR (France)	SPA (Belgium)	EST (Portugal)	Pts.
7	(United Kingdom) Raoul Owens	12	12	2	2	25	RET	53

=== Renault Sport Trophy - Pro Class 2016 ===
Pos.	Driver	ALC (Spain)		IMO (Italy)	RBR (Austria)		CPR (France)	SPA (Belgium)	EST (Portugal)		Pts.
Pos.	Driver	En	Pro	Pro	En	Pro	Pro	Pro	En	Pro	Pts.
9	(United Kingdom) Raoul Owens	8	Ret	1	4	Ret	10	10	Ret	4	34

=== Summary ===
YEAR	COMPETITION and SEASON HIGHLIGHTS
2006	Rotax Mini Max Regional Championship, South Africa
2007	Rotax Mini Max Regional Championship, South Africa **(Champion)**
2008	Rotax Junior Max Regional Championship, South Africa Rotax Junior Max Euro Championship, Pan European Series
2009	Rotax Junior Max Nationals, South Africa **(Vice Champion)**
2009	Rotax Junior Max Northern Regions, South Africa **(Vice Champion)** Rotax Junior Max World Finalist, Sharm El Sheik, Egypt Rotax Junior Max Euro Championship, Pan European Series
2010	Rotax Senior Max Super One, National Series, United Kingdom Rotax Senior Max Euro Championship, Pan European Series
2011	Formula Renault BARC, National Series, United Kingdom Formula Renault V de V (Magny-Cours) France **(2 podiums)**
2012	Formula Renault 2.0 Northern European Cup, (Spa) Belgium Formula Renault 2.0 BARC, National Series, United Kingdom Formula Renault 2.0 V de V, (Le Mans) France
2013	Formula Renault 2.0 Northern European Cup, Pan European FIA series (**Top 10 Finish / 1 Podium**)
2014	Formula Renault 2.0 Northern European Cup, Pan European FIA series (**Top 10 Finish / 1 Podium**)
2015	Mazda Road To Indy, Pro Mazda Championship, Pan North American series (**Hard Charger Award**, **Staublu Award**, **RePlay XD Move of the Race**)
2016	**Renault Sport Trophy**, **Spa Francorchamps** (**WIN**)
