= 2015 Blancpain Endurance Series =

Sports season

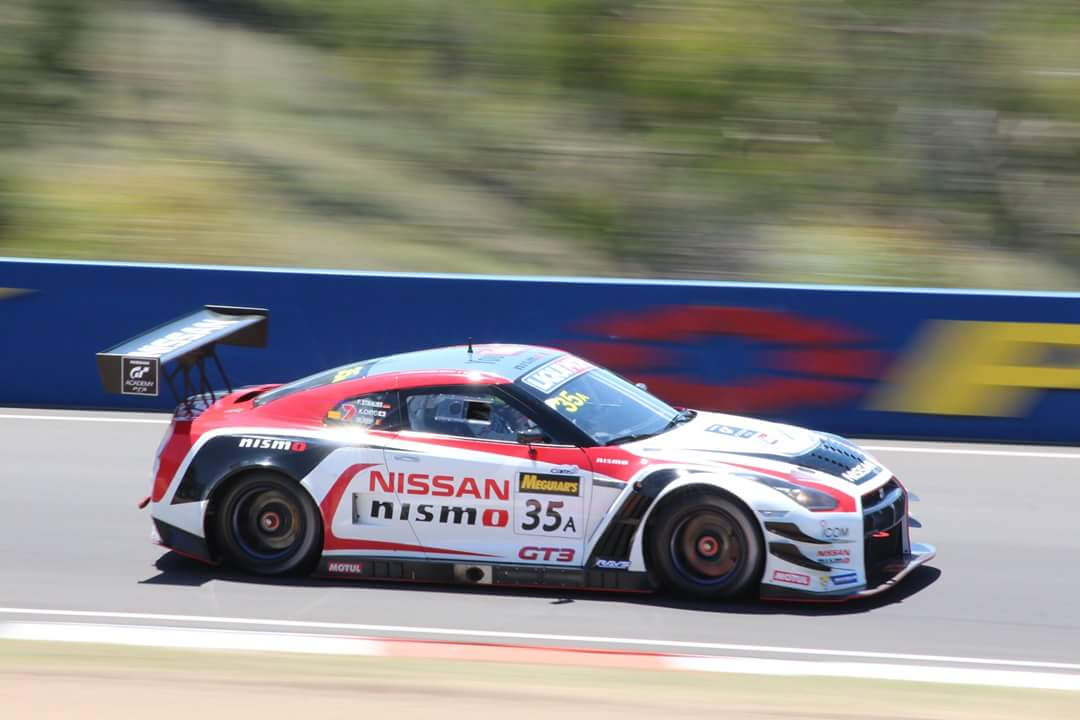
Alex Buncombe, Katsumasa Chiyo and Wolfgang Reip won the Series Championship in a Nissan GT-R Nismo GT3.

The 2015 Blancpain Endurance Series season was the fifth season of the Blancpain Endurance Series. The season started on 12 April at Monza and ended on 20 September at the Nürburgring. The season featured five rounds, with each race lasting for a duration of three hours besides the 24 Hours of Spa-Francorchamps and the 1000 km Paul Ricard events.

== Calendar ==
On 3 November 2014, the Stéphane Ratel Organisation announced the 2015 calendar. The calendar was the same of the previous season.

Rnd	Race	Circuit	Date	Report
1	3 Hours of Monza	Autodromo Nazionale Monza, Monza, Italy	12 April	Report
2	3 Hours of Silverstone	(United Kingdom) Silverstone Circuit, Silverstone, Great Britain	24 May	Report
3	1000 km Paul Ricard	Circuit Paul Ricard, Le Castellet, France	20 June	Report
4	Total 24 Hours of Spa	Circuit de Spa-Francorchamps, Spa, Belgium	25–26 July	Report
5	iRacing.com GT500	Nürburgring, Nürburg, Germany	20 September	Report

== Entry list ==
Team	Car	No.	Drivers	Rounds
Pro Cup
(Brazil) BMW Sports Trophy Team Brasil	BMW Z4 GT3	0	(Brazil) Cacá Bueno	1–2, 5
(Brazil) BMW Sports Trophy Team Brasil	BMW Z4 GT3	0	(Brazil) Felipe Fraga	1–2, 5
(Brazil) BMW Sports Trophy Team Brasil	BMW Z4 GT3	0	(Brazil) Sérgio Jimenez	1–2, 5
(Brazil) BMW Sports Trophy Team Brasil	BMW Z4 GT3	77	(Brazil) Átila Abreu	1–3, 5
(Brazil) BMW Sports Trophy Team Brasil	BMW Z4 GT3	77	(Brazil) Valdeno Brito	1–2, 5
(Brazil) BMW Sports Trophy Team Brasil	BMW Z4 GT3	77	(Brazil) Ricardo Sperafico	1
(Brazil) BMW Sports Trophy Team Brasil	BMW Z4 GT3	77	(Brazil) Matheus Stumpf	2, 5
(Brazil) BMW Sports Trophy Team Brasil	BMW Z4 GT3	77	(Brazil) Felipe Fraga	3–4
(Brazil) BMW Sports Trophy Team Brasil	BMW Z4 GT3	77	(Brazil) Sérgio Jimenez	3–4
(Brazil) BMW Sports Trophy Team Brasil	BMW Z4 GT3	77	(Brazil) Cacá Bueno	4
(Belgium) Belgian Audi Club Team WRT (Note: Entered as Audi Sport Team WRT with cars No. 2 at Monza and Nürburgring, No. 1 at Le Castellet and No. 1 and 2 at Spa.)	Audi R8 LMS ultra (Note: The team used Audi R8 LMS (2015) for cars No. 2 at Monza, No. 1 at Le Castellet and Nürburgring and No. 1 and 2 at Spa.)	1	(Netherlands) Robin Frijns	1–2, 5
(Belgium) Belgian Audi Club Team WRT	Audi R8 LMS ultra	1	(France) Jean-Karl Vernay	1–2, 5
(Belgium) Belgian Audi Club Team WRT	Audi R8 LMS ultra	1	(Belgium) Laurens Vanthoor	All
(Belgium) Belgian Audi Club Team WRT	Audi R8 LMS ultra	1	(Germany) René Rast	3–4
(Belgium) Belgian Audi Club Team WRT	Audi R8 LMS ultra	1	(Germany) Mike Rockenfeller	3
(Belgium) Belgian Audi Club Team WRT	Audi R8 LMS ultra	1	(Germany) Markus Winkelhock	4
(Belgium) Belgian Audi Club Team WRT	Audi R8 LMS ultra	2	(Monaco) Stéphane Ortelli	1, 4–5
(Belgium) Belgian Audi Club Team WRT	Audi R8 LMS ultra	2	(Germany) Frank Stippler	1, 4–5
(Belgium) Belgian Audi Club Team WRT	Audi R8 LMS ultra	2	(Switzerland) Nico Müller	1, 3–4
(Belgium) Belgian Audi Club Team WRT	Audi R8 LMS ultra	2	(Netherlands) Robin Frijns	3
(Belgium) Belgian Audi Club Team WRT	Audi R8 LMS ultra	2	(France) Jean-Karl Vernay	3
(Belgium) Belgian Audi Club Team WRT	Audi R8 LMS ultra	2	(Monaco) Stéphane Richelmi	5
(Belgium) Belgian Audi Club Team WRT	Audi R8 LMS ultra	3	(Monaco) Stéphane Richelmi	1–4
(Belgium) Belgian Audi Club Team WRT	Audi R8 LMS ultra	3	(South Africa) Kelvin van der Linde	1
(Belgium) Belgian Audi Club Team WRT	Audi R8 LMS ultra	3	(Germany) Christopher Mies	1
(Belgium) Belgian Audi Club Team WRT	Audi R8 LMS ultra	3	(Monaco) Stéphane Ortelli	2–3
(Belgium) Belgian Audi Club Team WRT	Audi R8 LMS ultra	3	(Germany) Frank Stippler	2–3
(Belgium) Belgian Audi Club Team WRT	Audi R8 LMS ultra	3	(Netherlands) Robin Frijns	4
(Belgium) Belgian Audi Club Team WRT	Audi R8 LMS ultra	3	(France) Jean-Karl Vernay	4
(Germany) Phoenix Racing	Audi R8 LMS (2015) (Note: The team used Audi R8 LMS ultra (2015) for car No. 6 at rounds 2, 3 and 5.)	5	(Germany) Christopher Mies	3–4
(Germany) Phoenix Racing	Audi R8 LMS (2015)	5	(Switzerland) Marcel Fässler	3
(Germany) Phoenix Racing	Audi R8 LMS (2015)	5	(Germany) Christopher Haase	3
(Germany) Phoenix Racing	Audi R8 LMS (2015)	5	(Denmark) Nicki Thiim	4
(Germany) Phoenix Racing	Audi R8 LMS (2015)	5	(Germany) Christian Mamerow	4
(Germany) Phoenix Racing	Audi R8 LMS (2015)	6	(Germany) Christian Mamerow	1
(Germany) Phoenix Racing	Audi R8 LMS (2015)	6	(Germany) Christopher Haase	1
(Germany) Phoenix Racing	Audi R8 LMS (2015)	6	(Germany) Markus Winkelhock	1–3, 5
(Germany) Phoenix Racing	Audi R8 LMS (2015)	6	(Hong Kong) Marchy Lee	2–3, 5
(Germany) Phoenix Racing	Audi R8 LMS (2015)	6	(Hong Kong) Shaun Thong	2–3, 5
(Germany) Phoenix Racing	Audi R8 LMS (2015)	6	(Switzerland) Marcel Fässler	4
(Germany) Phoenix Racing	Audi R8 LMS (2015)	6	(Germany) Mike Rockenfeller	4
(Germany) Phoenix Racing	Audi R8 LMS (2015)	6	(Germany) André Lotterer	4
(United Kingdom) Bentley M-Sport	Bentley Continental GT3	7	(United Kingdom) Steven Kane	All
(United Kingdom) Bentley M-Sport	Bentley Continental GT3	7	(United Kingdom) Andy Meyrick	All
(United Kingdom) Bentley M-Sport	Bentley Continental GT3	7	(United Kingdom) Guy Smith	All
(United Kingdom) Bentley M-Sport	Bentley Continental GT3	8	(Germany) Maximilian Buhk	All
(United Kingdom) Bentley M-Sport	Bentley Continental GT3	8	(Spain) Andy Soucek	All
(United Kingdom) Bentley M-Sport	Bentley Continental GT3	8	(Belgium) Maxime Soulet	All
(Italy) ROAL Motorsport	BMW Z4 GT3	9	(Germany) Timo Glock	3–4
(Italy) ROAL Motorsport	BMW Z4 GT3	9	(Canada) Bruno Spengler	3–4
(Italy) ROAL Motorsport	BMW Z4 GT3	9	(Italy) Alex Zanardi	3–4
(Austria) Grasser Racing Team	Lamborghini Huracán GT3	19	(Italy) Fabio Babini	All
(Austria) Grasser Racing Team	Lamborghini Huracán GT3	19	(Netherlands) Jeroen Mul	All
(Austria) Grasser Racing Team	Lamborghini Huracán GT3	19	(United States) Andrew Palmer	All
(Austria) Grasser Racing Team	Lamborghini Huracán GT3	63	(Italy) Mirko Bortolotti	All
(Austria) Grasser Racing Team	Lamborghini Huracán GT3	63	(Italy) Giovanni Venturini	All
(Austria) Grasser Racing Team	Lamborghini Huracán GT3	63	(South Africa) Adrian Zaugg	All
(France) AKKA ASP	Ferrari 458 GT3	20	(France) Morgan Moullin Traffort	3, 5
(France) AKKA ASP	Ferrari 458 GT3	20	(Italy) Alessandro Pier Guidi	3, 5
(France) AKKA ASP	Ferrari 458 GT3	20	(France) Tristan Vautier	3, 5
(Germany) Black Falcon	Mercedes-Benz SLS AMG GT3	21	(Netherlands) Yelmer Buurman	All
(Germany) Black Falcon	Mercedes-Benz SLS AMG GT3	21	(Saudi Arabia) Abdulaziz Bin Turki Al Faisal	All
(Germany) Black Falcon	Mercedes-Benz SLS AMG GT3	21	(Germany) Hubert Haupt	All
(Germany) Black Falcon	Mercedes-Benz SLS AMG GT3	29	(United Kingdom) Adam Christodoulou	4
(Germany) Black Falcon	Mercedes-Benz SLS AMG GT3	29	(Sweden) Andreas Simonsen	4
(Germany) Black Falcon	Mercedes-Benz SLS AMG GT3	29	(Belgium) Nico Verdonck	4
(United Kingdom) Nissan GT Academy Team RJN	Nissan GT-R Nismo GT3	23	(United Kingdom) Alex Buncombe	All
(United Kingdom) Nissan GT Academy Team RJN	Nissan GT-R Nismo GT3	23	(Japan) Katsumasa Chiyo	All
(United Kingdom) Nissan GT Academy Team RJN	Nissan GT-R Nismo GT3	23	(Belgium) Wolfgang Reip	All
(Germany) Car Collection Motorsport	Mercedes-Benz SLS AMG GT3	33	(Germany) Kenneth Heyer	2–3
(Germany) Car Collection Motorsport	Mercedes-Benz SLS AMG GT3	33	(Germany) Jan Seyffarth	2–3
(Germany) Car Collection Motorsport	Mercedes-Benz SLS AMG GT3	33	(Spain) Miguel Toril	2–3
(France) Saintéloc	Audi R8 LMS ultra	35	(France) Grégory Guilvert	All
(France) Saintéloc	Audi R8 LMS ultra	35	(Sweden) Edward Sandström	1–2, 4
(France) Saintéloc	Audi R8 LMS ultra	35	(Italy) Edoardo Mortara	1, 3
(France) Saintéloc	Audi R8 LMS ultra	35	(Germany) Marc Basseng	2, 4
(France) Saintéloc	Audi R8 LMS ultra	35	(France) Adrien Tambay	3
(France) Saintéloc	Audi R8 LMS ultra	35	(Germany) Christopher Mies	5
(France) Saintéloc	Audi R8 LMS ultra	35	(Spain) Miguel Molina	5
Oman Racing Team	Aston Martin V12 Vantage GT3	44	(United Kingdom) Jonathan Adam	1–3
Oman Racing Team	Aston Martin V12 Vantage GT3	44	(Oman) Ahmad Al Harthy	1–3, 5
Oman Racing Team	Aston Martin V12 Vantage GT3	44	(United Kingdom) Daniel Lloyd	1–3
Oman Racing Team	Aston Martin V12 Vantage GT3	44	(United Kingdom) Rory Butcher	5
Oman Racing Team	Aston Martin V12 Vantage GT3	44	(Germany) Stefan Mücke	5
(Belgium) BMW Sports Trophy Team Marc VDS	BMW Z4 GT3	45	(Brazil) Augusto Farfus	4
(Belgium) BMW Sports Trophy Team Marc VDS	BMW Z4 GT3	45	(Germany) Dirk Werner	4
(Belgium) BMW Sports Trophy Team Marc VDS	BMW Z4 GT3	45	(Belgium) Maxime Martin	4
(Belgium) BMW Sports Trophy Team Marc VDS	BMW Z4 GT3	46	(Belgium) Maxime Martin	3
(Belgium) BMW Sports Trophy Team Marc VDS	BMW Z4 GT3	46	(Germany) Lucas Luhr	3–4
(Belgium) BMW Sports Trophy Team Marc VDS	BMW Z4 GT3	46	(Finland) Markus Palttala	3–4
(Belgium) BMW Sports Trophy Team Marc VDS	BMW Z4 GT3	46	(Netherlands) Nick Catsburg	4
(Germany) Attempto Racing	McLaren 650S GT3	54	(Finland) Antti Buri	2
(Germany) Attempto Racing	McLaren 650S GT3	54	(Russia) Vadim Gitlin	2
(Germany) Attempto Racing	McLaren 650S GT3	54	(United Kingdom) Oliver Webb	2
(Germany) Attempto Racing	McLaren 650S GT3	55	(France) Nicolas Armindo	1–2
(Germany) Attempto Racing	McLaren 650S GT3	55	(Portugal) Miguel Ramos	1–2
(Germany) Attempto Racing	McLaren 650S GT3	55	(Switzerland) Fabien Thuner	1–2
(New Zealand) Von Ryan Racing	McLaren 650S GT3	58	(United Kingdom) Rob Bell	All
(New Zealand) Von Ryan Racing	McLaren 650S GT3	58	(France) Kévin Estre	All
(New Zealand) Von Ryan Racing	McLaren 650S GT3	58	(New Zealand) Shane van Gisbergen	1–2, 4–5
(New Zealand) Von Ryan Racing	McLaren 650S GT3	58	(France) Nicolas Lapierre	3
(New Zealand) Von Ryan Racing	McLaren 650S GT3	59	(United Kingdom) Adrian Quaife-Hobbs	All
(New Zealand) Von Ryan Racing	McLaren 650S GT3	59	(Portugal) Álvaro Parente	All
(New Zealand) Von Ryan Racing	McLaren 650S GT3	59	(Brazil) Bruno Senna	1, 3–5
(New Zealand) Von Ryan Racing	McLaren 650S GT3	59	(France) Nicolas Lapierre	2
(Germany) Black PearL Racing by Rinaldi	Ferrari 458 GT3	66	(Germany) Pierre Kaffer	3
(Germany) Black PearL Racing by Rinaldi	Ferrari 458 GT3	66	(Germany) Steve Parrow	3
(Germany) Black PearL Racing by Rinaldi	Ferrari 458 GT3	66	(Germany) Dominik Schwager	3
(Germany) MRS GT-Racing	Nissan GT-R Nismo GT3	73	(United Kingdom) Craig Dolby	1–4
(Germany) MRS GT-Racing	Nissan GT-R Nismo GT3	73	(United Kingdom) Martin Plowman	1–4
(Germany) MRS GT-Racing	Nissan GT-R Nismo GT3	73	(United Kingdom) Sean Walkinshaw	1–4
(Czech Republic) ISR	Audi R8 LMS ultra	74	(Denmark) Anders Fjordbach	1–2
(Czech Republic) ISR	Audi R8 LMS ultra	74	(Italy) Fabio Onidi	1–2
(Czech Republic) ISR	Audi R8 LMS ultra	74	(Italy) Andrea Roda	1–2
(Czech Republic) ISR	Audi R8 LMS ultra	75	(Italy) Marco Bonanomi	All
(Czech Republic) ISR	Audi R8 LMS ultra	75	(Czech Republic) Filip Salaquarda	All
(Czech Republic) ISR	Audi R8 LMS ultra	75	(Belgium) Frédéric Vervisch	All
(Germany) Bentley Team HTP	Bentley Continental GT3	84	(France) Vincent Abril	All
(Germany) Bentley Team HTP	Bentley Continental GT3	84	(France) Mike Parisy	All
(Germany) Bentley Team HTP	Bentley Continental GT3	84	(Switzerland) Harold Primat	All
(Germany) Rowe Racing (Note: Entered as Team Astana by Rowe with car No. 98.)	Mercedes-Benz SLS AMG GT3	98	(Netherlands) Indy Dontje	1–3
(Germany) Rowe Racing	Mercedes-Benz SLS AMG GT3	98	(Spain) Daniel Juncadella	1–2
(Germany) Rowe Racing	Mercedes-Benz SLS AMG GT3	98	(Denmark) Nicolai Sylvest	1–3, 5
(Germany) Rowe Racing	Mercedes-Benz SLS AMG GT3	98	(Germany) Thomas Jäger	3
(Germany) Rowe Racing	Mercedes-Benz SLS AMG GT3	98	(Germany) Kenneth Heyer	5
(Germany) Rowe Racing	Mercedes-Benz SLS AMG GT3	98	(Spain) Miguel Toril	5
(Germany) Rowe Racing	Mercedes-Benz SLS AMG GT3	99	(Germany) Nico Bastian	All
(Germany) Rowe Racing	Mercedes-Benz SLS AMG GT3	99	(Netherlands) Stef Dusseldorp	All
(Germany) Rowe Racing	Mercedes-Benz SLS AMG GT3	99	(Germany) Klaus Graf	1–2
(Germany) Rowe Racing	Mercedes-Benz SLS AMG GT3	99	(Spain) Daniel Juncadella	3–5
(Germany) BMW Sports Trophy Team Schubert	BMW Z4 GT3	120	(Austria) Dominik Baumann	2
(Germany) BMW Sports Trophy Team Schubert	BMW Z4 GT3	120	(Germany) Claudia Hürtgen	2
(Germany) BMW Sports Trophy Team Schubert	BMW Z4 GT3	120	(Germany) Max Sandritter	2
(United States) Always Evolving Motorsport	Nissan GT-R Nismo GT3	173	(United Kingdom) Craig Dolby	5
(United States) Always Evolving Motorsport	Nissan GT-R Nismo GT3	173	(United Kingdom) Martin Plowman	5
(United States) Always Evolving Motorsport	Nissan GT-R Nismo GT3	173	(United Kingdom) Sean Walkinshaw	5
(Germany) Rinaldi Racing	Ferrari 458 GT3	333	(Russia) Rinat Salikhov	2–3, 5
(Germany) Rinaldi Racing	Ferrari 458 GT3	333	(Germany) Marco Seefried	2–3
(Germany) Rinaldi Racing	Ferrari 458 GT3	333	(Austria) Norbert Siedler	2–3, 5
(Germany) Rinaldi Racing	Ferrari 458 GT3	333	(Germany) Robert Renauer	5
Pro-Am Cup
(Belgium) Belgian Audi Club Team WRT (Note: Entered as Audi Sport Team WRT with car No. 2 and as Team WRT with car No. 4.)	Audi R8 LMS ultra	2	(France) Phillippe Gaillard	2
(Belgium) Belgian Audi Club Team WRT	Audi R8 LMS ultra	2	(France) David Hallyday	2
(Belgium) Belgian Audi Club Team WRT	Audi R8 LMS ultra	2	(United Kingdom) James Nash	2
(Belgium) Belgian Audi Club Team WRT	Audi R8 LMS ultra	3	(France) David Hallyday	5
(Belgium) Belgian Audi Club Team WRT	Audi R8 LMS ultra	3	(France) Christophe Hamon	5
(Belgium) Belgian Audi Club Team WRT	Audi R8 LMS ultra	3	(France) Lonni Martins	5
(Belgium) Belgian Audi Club Team WRT	Audi R8 LMS ultra	4	(France) Sacha Bottemane	All
(Belgium) Belgian Audi Club Team WRT	Audi R8 LMS ultra	4	(Netherlands) Max Koebolt	All
(Belgium) Belgian Audi Club Team WRT	Audi R8 LMS ultra	4	(Netherlands) Pieter Schothorst	All
(Belgium) Belgian Audi Club Team WRT	Audi R8 LMS ultra	4	(United Kingdom) James Nash	4
(France) AKKA ASP	Ferrari 458 GT3	10	(France) Maurice Ricci	1–2
(France) AKKA ASP	Ferrari 458 GT3	10	(France) Gabriel Balthazard	1
(France) AKKA ASP	Ferrari 458 GT3	10	(France) Tristan Vautier	1
(France) AKKA ASP	Ferrari 458 GT3	10	(France) Ludovic Badey	2
(France) AKKA ASP	Ferrari 458 GT3	20	(France) Jean-Luc Beaubelique	1–2
(France) AKKA ASP	Ferrari 458 GT3	20	(France) Philippe Giauque	1–2
(France) AKKA ASP	Ferrari 458 GT3	20	(France) Morgan Moullin Traffort	1–2
(Switzerland) Kessel Racing	Ferrari 458 Italia GT3	11	(Italy) Alessandro Bonacini	All
(Switzerland) Kessel Racing	Ferrari 458 Italia GT3	11	(Poland) Michał Broniszewski	All
(Switzerland) Kessel Racing	Ferrari 458 Italia GT3	11	(United Kingdom) Michael Lyons	All
(Switzerland) Kessel Racing	Ferrari 458 Italia GT3	11	(Italy) Andrea Piccini	4
(France) TDS Racing	BMW Z4 GT3	12	(France) Eric Dermont	All
(France) TDS Racing	BMW Z4 GT3	12	(France) Henry Hassid	All
(France) TDS Racing	BMW Z4 GT3	12	(France) Franck Perera	All
(France) TDS Racing	BMW Z4 GT3	12	(Switzerland) Mathias Beche	4
(Switzerland) Emil Frey Racing	Emil Frey GT3 Jaguar	14	(Switzerland) Fredy Barth	All
(Switzerland) Emil Frey Racing	Emil Frey GT3 Jaguar	14	(Switzerland) Lorenz Frey	All
(Switzerland) Emil Frey Racing	Emil Frey GT3 Jaguar	14	(Switzerland) Gabriele Gardel	All
(Switzerland) Emil Frey Racing	Emil Frey GT3 Jaguar	14	(Switzerland) Jonathan Hirschi	4
Insight Racing Denmark	Ferrari 458 GT3	17	(Denmark) Dennis Andersen	All
Insight Racing Denmark	Ferrari 458 GT3	17	(Denmark) Martin Jensen	All
Insight Racing Denmark	Ferrari 458 GT3	17	(Denmark) Anders Fjordbach	4
(Germany) Black Falcon	Mercedes-Benz SLS AMG GT3	18	(Germany) Maro Engel	All
(Germany) Black Falcon	Mercedes-Benz SLS AMG GT3	18	(United States) Sean Johnston	All
(Germany) Black Falcon	Mercedes-Benz SLS AMG GT3	18	(United Kingdom) Oliver Morley	All
(Germany) Black Falcon	Mercedes-Benz SLS AMG GT3	18	(Germany) Bernd Schneider	4
(United Kingdom) Nissan GT Academy Team RJN	Nissan GT-R Nismo GT3	22	(Mexico) Ricardo Sánchez	All
(United Kingdom) Nissan GT Academy Team RJN	Nissan GT-R Nismo GT3	22	(Germany) Florian Strauss	1, 4
(United Kingdom) Nissan GT Academy Team RJN	Nissan GT-R Nismo GT3	22	(Germany) Marc Gassner	1
(United Kingdom) Nissan GT Academy Team RJN	Nissan GT-R Nismo GT3	22	(France) Gaëtan Paletou	2–5
(United Kingdom) Nissan GT Academy Team RJN	Nissan GT-R Nismo GT3	22	(United Kingdom) Jann Mardenborough	2
(United Kingdom) Nissan GT Academy Team RJN	Nissan GT-R Nismo GT3	22	(Russia) Mark Shulzhitskiy	3
(United Kingdom) Nissan GT Academy Team RJN	Nissan GT-R Nismo GT3	22	(France) Olivier Pla	4
(United Kingdom) Nissan GT Academy Team RJN	Nissan GT-R Nismo GT3	22	(United Kingdom) Harry Tincknell	5
(United Kingdom) TF Sport	Aston Martin V12 Vantage GT3	27	(United Kingdom) Bradley Ellis	5
(United Kingdom) TF Sport	Aston Martin V12 Vantage GT3	27	(United Kingdom) Euan Hankey	5
(United Kingdom) TF Sport	Aston Martin V12 Vantage GT3	27	(Turkey) Salih Yoluç	5
(France) Classic & Modern Racing	BMW Z4 GT3	30	(Switzerland) Jonathan Hirschi	3
(France) Classic & Modern Racing	BMW Z4 GT3	30	(Switzerland) Pierre Hirschi	3
(France) Classic & Modern Racing	BMW Z4 GT3	30	(Belgium) Christian Kelders	3
(United Kingdom) Leonard Motorsport AMR	Aston Martin V12 Vantage GT3	32	(United Kingdom) Stuart Leonard	All
(United Kingdom) Leonard Motorsport AMR	Aston Martin V12 Vantage GT3	32	(United Kingdom) Michael Meadows	All
(United Kingdom) Leonard Motorsport AMR	Aston Martin V12 Vantage GT3	32	(United Kingdom) Paul Wilson	1–3, 5
(United Kingdom) Leonard Motorsport AMR	Aston Martin V12 Vantage GT3	32	(Germany) Stefan Mücke	4
(United Kingdom) Leonard Motorsport AMR	Aston Martin V12 Vantage GT3	32	(United Kingdom) Tom Onslow-Cole	4
(Germany) Car Collection Motorsport	Mercedes-Benz SLS AMG GT3	33	(Germany) Peter Schmidt	1, 5
(Germany) Car Collection Motorsport	Mercedes-Benz SLS AMG GT3	33	(Germany) Kenneth Heyer	1
(Germany) Car Collection Motorsport	Mercedes-Benz SLS AMG GT3	33	(Spain) Miguel Toril	1
(Germany) Car Collection Motorsport	Mercedes-Benz SLS AMG GT3	33	(Switzerland) Daniel Allemann	5
(Germany) Car Collection Motorsport	Mercedes-Benz SLS AMG GT3	33	(Austria) Karl Wendlinger	5
(Germany) Car Collection Motorsport	Mercedes-Benz SLS AMG GT3	34	(Germany) Pierre Ehret	3
(Germany) Car Collection Motorsport	Mercedes-Benz SLS AMG GT3	34	(Germany) Peter Schmidt	3
(Germany) Car Collection Motorsport	Mercedes-Benz SLS AMG GT3	34	(Netherlands) Renger van der Zande	3
(France) Saintéloc	Audi R8 LMS ultra	36	(France) Grégoire Demoustier	5
(France) Saintéloc	Audi R8 LMS ultra	36	(France) Gilles Lallemant	5
(France) Saintéloc	Audi R8 LMS ultra	36	(France) Marc Rostan	5
(France) Sport Garage	Ferrari 458 Italia GT3	41	(France) Enzo Guibbert	All
(France) Sport Garage	Ferrari 458 Italia GT3	41	(France) Gilles Vannelet	All
(France) Sport Garage	Ferrari 458 Italia GT3	41	(France) Arno Santamato	1–3, 5
(France) Sport Garage	Ferrari 458 Italia GT3	41	(France) Éric Cayrolle	4
(France) Sport Garage	Ferrari 458 Italia GT3	41	(Italy) Gabriele Lancieri	4
Oman Racing Team	Aston Martin V12 Vantage GT3	44	(United Kingdom) Jonathan Adam	4
Oman Racing Team	Aston Martin V12 Vantage GT3	44	(Oman) Ahmad Al Harthy	4
Oman Racing Team	Aston Martin V12 Vantage GT3	44	(United Kingdom) Daniel Lloyd	4
Oman Racing Team	Aston Martin V12 Vantage GT3	44	(Australia) Jonathan Venter	4
(Italy) AF Corse	Ferrari 458 GT3	47	(Italy) Gianmaria Bruni	4
(Italy) AF Corse	Ferrari 458 GT3	47	(Thailand) Pasin Lathouras	4
(Italy) AF Corse	Ferrari 458 GT3	47	(Belgium) Stéphane Lémeret	4
(Italy) AF Corse	Ferrari 458 GT3	47	(Italy) Alessandro Pier Guidi	4
(Italy) AF Corse	Ferrari 458 GT3	51	(United Kingdom) Duncan Cameron	All
(Italy) AF Corse	Ferrari 458 GT3	51	(Republic of Ireland) Matt Griffin	All
(Italy) AF Corse	Ferrari 458 GT3	51	(Portugal) Francisco Guedes	3–4
(Italy) AF Corse	Ferrari 458 GT3	51	(Italy) Davide Rigon	4
(Italy) AF Corse	Ferrari 458 GT3	52	(Belgium) Adrien de Leener	All
(Italy) AF Corse	Ferrari 458 GT3	52	(Monaco) Cédric Sbirrazzuoli	All
(Italy) AF Corse	Ferrari 458 GT3	52	(Italy) Raffaele Giammaria	4
(Italy) AF Corse	Ferrari 458 GT3	52	(Finland) Toni Vilander	4
(Italy) AF Corse	Ferrari 458 GT3	53	(Italy) Marco Cioci	All
(Italy) AF Corse	Ferrari 458 GT3	53	(Italy) Piergiuseppe Perazzini	All
(Italy) AF Corse	Ferrari 458 GT3	53	(Venezuela) Enzo Potolicchio	1–4
(Italy) AF Corse	Ferrari 458 GT3	53	(Italy) Michele Rugolo	4
(Italy) AF Corse	Ferrari 458 GT3	53	(Portugal) Francesco Guedes	5
(Germany) Attempto Racing	McLaren 650S GT3	54	(Italy) Alessandro Balzan	1
(Germany) Attempto Racing	McLaren 650S GT3	54	(Japan) Yoshiharu Mori	1
(Germany) Attempto Racing	McLaren 650S GT3	54	(Italy) Ronnie Valori	1
(Germany) Attempto Racing	McLaren 650S GT3	54	(Argentina) Juan Cruz Álvarez	3
(Germany) Attempto Racing	McLaren 650S GT3	54	(Argentina) Gustavo Borches	3
(Germany) Attempto Racing	McLaren 650S GT3	54	(Turkey) Sergio Alejandro Yazbil	3
(Germany) Attempto Racing	McLaren 650S GT3	55	(Ukraine) Sergey Chukanov	3
(Germany) Attempto Racing	McLaren 650S GT3	55	(Russia) Vadim Gitlin	3
(Germany) Attempto Racing	McLaren 650S GT3	55	(Portugal) Miguel Ramos	3
(Germany) Black PearL Racing by Rinaldi	Ferrari 458 GT3	66	(Germany) Pierre Kaffer	1–2
(Germany) Black PearL Racing by Rinaldi	Ferrari 458 GT3	66	(Germany) Steve Parrow	1–2, 5
(Germany) Black PearL Racing by Rinaldi	Ferrari 458 GT3	66	(Germany) Dominik Schwager	5
(Russia) GT Russian Team	Mercedes-Benz SLS AMG GT3	70	(Russia) Aleksey Karachev	All
(Russia) GT Russian Team	Mercedes-Benz SLS AMG GT3	70	(Germany) Bernd Schneider	1
(Russia) GT Russian Team	Mercedes-Benz SLS AMG GT3	70	(France) Christophe Bouchut	2, 4
(Russia) GT Russian Team	Mercedes-Benz SLS AMG GT3	70	(Czech Republic) Dennis Waszek	2, 5
(Russia) GT Russian Team	Mercedes-Benz SLS AMG GT3	70	(Estonia) Marko Asmer	3
(Russia) GT Russian Team	Mercedes-Benz SLS AMG GT3	70	(Russia) Aleksey Vasilyev	3
(Russia) GT Russian Team	Mercedes-Benz SLS AMG GT3	70	(Germany) Kenneth Heyer	4
(Russia) GT Russian Team	Mercedes-Benz SLS AMG GT3	70	(Spain) Miguel Toril	4
(Russia) GT Russian Team	Mercedes-Benz SLS AMG GT3	70	(Netherlands) Indy Dontje	5
(Russia) GT Russian Team	Mercedes-Benz SLS AMG GT3	71	(Estonia) Marko Asmer	1–2, 4–5
(Russia) GT Russian Team	Mercedes-Benz SLS AMG GT3	71	(Russia) Aleksey Vasilyev	1–2, 4–5
(Russia) GT Russian Team	Mercedes-Benz SLS AMG GT3	71	(United Arab Emirates) Karim Al Azhari	2, 5
(Russia) GT Russian Team	Mercedes-Benz SLS AMG GT3	71	(Netherlands) Indy Dontje	4
(Russia) GT Russian Team	Mercedes-Benz SLS AMG GT3	71	(United Kingdom) Lewis Plato	4
Team Russia by Barwell	BMW Z4 GT3	78	(United Kingdom) Jonny Cocker	1–2, 4–5
Team Russia by Barwell	BMW Z4 GT3	78	(Russia) Leonid Machitski	1–2, 4–5
Team Russia by Barwell	BMW Z4 GT3	78	(Russia) Timur Sardarov	1–2, 5
Team Russia by Barwell	BMW Z4 GT3	78	(United Kingdom) Phil Keen	4
Team Russia by Barwell	BMW Z4 GT3	78	(United Kingdom) Jon Minshaw	4
(United Kingdom) Ecurie Ecosse	BMW Z4 GT3	79	(United Kingdom) Oliver Bryant	All
(United Kingdom) Ecurie Ecosse	BMW Z4 GT3	79	(United Kingdom) Alasdair McCaig	All
(United Kingdom) Ecurie Ecosse	BMW Z4 GT3	79	(United Kingdom) Devon Modell	All
(United Kingdom) Ecurie Ecosse	BMW Z4 GT3	79	(United Kingdom) Alexander Sims	4
(Germany) Bentley Team HTP	Bentley Continental GT3	83	(Germany) Fabian Hamprecht	4
(Germany) Bentley Team HTP	Bentley Continental GT3	83	(Belgium) Louis Machiels	4
(Germany) Bentley Team HTP	Bentley Continental GT3	83	(Austria) Clemens Schmid	4
(Germany) Bentley Team HTP	Bentley Continental GT3	83	(Netherlands) Max van Splunteren	4
(United States) DragonSpeed	Ferrari 458 GT3	100	(Sweden) Henrik Hedman	All
(United States) DragonSpeed	Ferrari 458 GT3	100	(United States) Elton Julian	All
(United States) DragonSpeed	Ferrari 458 GT3	100	(Italy) Thomas Kemenater	1–3, 5
(United States) DragonSpeed	Ferrari 458 GT3	100	(United Kingdom) Ryan Dalziel	4
(United States) DragonSpeed	Ferrari 458 GT3	100	(United States) Anthony Lazzaro	4
(Belgium) BMW Racing Against Cancer	BMW Z4 GT3	240	(Belgium) Marc Duez	4
(Belgium) BMW Racing Against Cancer	BMW Z4 GT3	240	(Belgium) Jean-Michel Martin	4
(Belgium) BMW Racing Against Cancer	BMW Z4 GT3	240	(Belgium) Eric van de Poele	4
(Belgium) BMW Racing Against Cancer	BMW Z4 GT3	240	(Belgium) Pascal Witmeur	4
(Germany) Rinaldi Racing	Ferrari 458 GT3	333	(Russia) Rinat Salikhov	1, 4
(Germany) Rinaldi Racing	Ferrari 458 GT3	333	(Austria) Norbert Siedler	1, 4
(Germany) Rinaldi Racing	Ferrari 458 GT3	333	(Germany) Marco Seefried	4
(Germany) Rinaldi Racing	Ferrari 458 GT3	333	(Belgium) Stef Van Campenhout	4
(United Kingdom) Triple Eight Racing	BMW Z4 GT3	888	(United Kingdom) Lee Mowle	All
(United Kingdom) Triple Eight Racing	BMW Z4 GT3	888	(United Kingdom) Joe Osborne	All
(United Kingdom) Triple Eight Racing	BMW Z4 GT3	888	(United Kingdom) Ryan Ratcliffe	All
(United Kingdom) Triple Eight Racing	BMW Z4 GT3	888	(Germany) Dirk Müller	4
Am Cup
(France) AKKA ASP	Ferrari 458 GT3	10	(France) Jean-Luc Beaubelique	3, 5
(France) AKKA ASP	Ferrari 458 GT3	10	(France) Philippe Giauque	3
(France) AKKA ASP	Ferrari 458 GT3	10	(France) Maurice Ricci	3, 5
(France) AKKA ASP	Ferrari 458 GT3	10	(France) Jean-Philippe Belloc	4
(France) AKKA ASP	Ferrari 458 GT3	10	(France) Christophe Bourret	4
(France) AKKA ASP	Ferrari 458 GT3	10	(France) Pascal Gibon	4
(France) AKKA ASP	Ferrari 458 GT3	10	(France) Philippe Polette	4
(France) AKKA ASP	Ferrari 458 GT3	16	(France) Fabien Barthez	1–3, 5
(France) AKKA ASP	Ferrari 458 GT3	16	(France) Anthony Pons	1–3, 5
(Belgium) Boutsen Ginion	BMW Z4 GT3	15	(Luxembourg) Olivier Grotz	All
(Belgium) Boutsen Ginion	BMW Z4 GT3	15	(Saudi Arabia) Karim Ojjeh	All
(Belgium) Boutsen Ginion	BMW Z4 GT3	15	(South Africa) Jordan Grogor	4
(Belgium) Boutsen Ginion	BMW Z4 GT3	15	(Germany) Werner Hamprecht	4
(United Kingdom) Team Parker Racing	Audi R8 LMS ultra	24	(United Kingdom) Ian Loggie	All
(United Kingdom) Team Parker Racing	Audi R8 LMS ultra	24	(United Kingdom) Julian Westwood	All
(United Kingdom) Team Parker Racing	Audi R8 LMS ultra	24	(Denmark) Benny Simonsen	3–4
(United Kingdom) Team Parker Racing	Audi R8 LMS ultra	24	(United Kingdom) Callum MacLeod	4
(Switzerland) Glorax Racing	Ferrari 458 GT3	25	(Russia) Andrey Birzhin	1–3
(Switzerland) Glorax Racing	Ferrari 458 GT3	25	(Italy) Fabio Mancini	1–3
(Switzerland) Glorax Racing	Ferrari 458 GT3	25	(Italy) Rino Mastronardi	1–3
(Belgium) Delahaye Racing Team	Porsche 997 GT3-R	28	(France) Pierre Etienne Bordet	All
(Belgium) Delahaye Racing Team	Porsche 997 GT3-R	28	(France) Alexandre Viron	All
(Belgium) Delahaye Racing Team	Porsche 997 GT3-R	28	(France) Emmanuel Orgeval	2–5
(Belgium) Delahaye Racing Team	Porsche 997 GT3-R	28	(France) Paul-Loup Chatin	4
(France) Classic & Modern Racing	BMW Z4 GT3	30	(France) Jean-Luc Blanchemain	1–2, 4–5
(France) Classic & Modern Racing	BMW Z4 GT3	30	(Switzerland) Pierre Hirschi	1–2, 4–5
(France) Classic & Modern Racing	BMW Z4 GT3	30	(Belgium) Christian Kelders	1, 4–5
(France) Classic & Modern Racing	BMW Z4 GT3	30	(Belgium) Frédéric Bouvy	4
(Germany) Car Collection Motorsport	Mercedes-Benz SLS AMG GT3	34	(Germany) Pierre Ehret	1–2, 5
(Germany) Car Collection Motorsport	Mercedes-Benz SLS AMG GT3	34	(Germany) Alexander Mattschull	1–2, 5
(France) Saintéloc	Audi R8 LMS ultra	36	(France) Jean-Paul Buffin	1–3
(France) Saintéloc	Audi R8 LMS ultra	36	(France) Georges Cabanne	1–3
(France) Saintéloc	Audi R8 LMS ultra	36	(France) Marc Sourd	1
(France) Saintéloc	Audi R8 LMS ultra	36	(France) Gilles Lallemant	2–4
(France) Saintéloc	Audi R8 LMS ultra	36	(France) Michael Blanchemain	4
(France) Saintéloc	Audi R8 LMS ultra	36	(Italy) Beniamino Caccia	4
(France) Saintéloc	Audi R8 LMS ultra	36	(France) Philippe Haezebrouck	4
(France) Saintéloc	Audi R8 LMS ultra	37	(France) Claude-Yves Gosselin	2
(France) Saintéloc	Audi R8 LMS ultra	37	(France) Jean-Claude Lagniez	2
(France) Saintéloc	Audi R8 LMS ultra	37	(France) Marc Rostan	2
(France) Sport Garage	Ferrari 458 Italia GT3	42	(France) Tony Samon	2, 4
(France) Sport Garage	Ferrari 458 Italia GT3	42	(France) Christophe Hamon	2
(France) Sport Garage	Ferrari 458 Italia GT3	42	(France) Luc Paillard	2
(France) Sport Garage	Ferrari 458 Italia GT3	42	(France) Sylvain Debs	3
(France) Sport Garage	Ferrari 458 Italia GT3	42	(United Arab Emirates) Bashar Mardini	3
(France) Sport Garage	Ferrari 458 Italia GT3	42	(France) Nicolas Misslin	3
(France) Sport Garage	Ferrari 458 Italia GT3	42	(France) Christian Beroujon	4
(France) Sport Garage	Ferrari 458 Italia GT3	42	(Belgium) Christoff Corten	4
(France) Sport Garage	Ferrari 458 Italia GT3	42	(France) Marc Guillot	4
(Italy) AF Corse	Ferrari 458 GT3	48	(Belgium) Patrick Van Glabeke	3
(Italy) AF Corse	Ferrari 458 GT3	48	(Netherlands) Martin Lanting	3
(Italy) AF Corse	Ferrari 458 GT3	48	(Belgium) Louis-Philippe Soenen	3
(Italy) AF Corse	Ferrari 458 GT3	49	(France) Jean-Marc Bachelier	1–3
(Italy) AF Corse	Ferrari 458 GT3	49	(Italy) Howard Blank	1–3
(Italy) AF Corse	Ferrari 458 GT3	49	(France) Yannick Mallegol	1–3
(Italy) AF Corse	Ferrari 458 GT3	50	(Russia) Garry Kondakov	All
(Italy) AF Corse	Ferrari 458 GT3	50	(Russia) Alexander Moiseev	All
(Italy) AF Corse	Ferrari 458 GT3	50	(Italy) Riccardo Ragazzi	All
(Italy) AF Corse	Ferrari 458 GT3	50	(Portugal) Rui Águas	4
(Germany) Attempto Racing	Porsche 997 GT3-R	56	(Germany) Jürgen Häring	All
(Germany) Attempto Racing	Porsche 997 GT3-R	56	(Greece) Dimitrios Konstantinou	All
(Germany) Attempto Racing	Porsche 997 GT3-R	56	(Germany) Frank Schmickler	All
(Germany) Attempto Racing	Porsche 997 GT3-R	56	(Germany) Philipp Wlazik	4
Team Russia by Barwell	BMW Z4 GT3	78	(Russia) Leonid Machitski	3
Team Russia by Barwell	BMW Z4 GT3	78	(Russia) Timur Sardarov	3
(France) Duqueine Engineering	Ferrari 458 Italia GT3	90	(France) Romain Brandela	4
(France) Duqueine Engineering	Ferrari 458 Italia GT3	90	(France) Eric Clément	4
(France) Duqueine Engineering	Ferrari 458 Italia GT3	90	(Belgium) Bernard Delhez	4
(France) Duqueine Engineering	Ferrari 458 Italia GT3	90	(France) Gilles Duqueine	4
(Switzerland) Kessel Racing	Ferrari 458 Italia GT3	111	(United States) Stephen Earle	All
(Switzerland) Kessel Racing	Ferrari 458 Italia GT3	111	(Australia) Liam Talbot	All
(Switzerland) Kessel Racing	Ferrari 458 Italia GT3	111	(Italy) Marco Zanuttini	All
(Switzerland) Kessel Racing	Ferrari 458 Italia GT3	111	(France) Marc Rostan	4

== Results and standings ==
=== Race results ===
Rnd.	Circuit	Pole position	Pro winners	Pro-Am winners	Am winners
1	Monza	(Germany) No. 333 Rinaldi Racing	(Austria) No. 19 Grasser Racing Team	(Germany) No. 333 Rinaldi Racing	(Switzerland) No. 111 Kessel Racing
1	Monza	(Russia) Rinat Salikhov (Austria) Norbert Siedler	(Italy) Fabio Babini (Netherlands) Jeroen Mul (United States) Andrew Palmer	(Russia) Rinat Salikhov (Austria) Norbert Siedler	(United States) Stephen Earle (Australia) Liam Talbot (Italy) Marco Zanuttini
2	Silverstone	(United Kingdom) No. 23 Nissan GT Academy Team RJN	(New Zealand) No. 58 Von Ryan Racing	(United Kingdom) No. 32 Leonard Motorsport AMR	(Belgium) No. 15 Boutsen Ginion
2	Silverstone	(United Kingdom) Alex Buncombe (Japan) Katsumasa Chiyo (Belgium) Wolfgang Reip	(United Kingdom) Rob Bell (France) Kévin Estre (New Zealand) Shane van Gisbergen	(United Kingdom) Stuart Leonard (United Kingdom) Michael Meadows (United Kingdom) Paul Wilson	(Luxembourg) Olivier Grotz (Saudi Arabia) Karim Ojjeh
3	Paul Ricard	(Austria) No. 63 Grasser Racing Team	(United Kingdom) No. 23 Nissan GT Academy Team RJN	(Switzerland) No. 11 Kessel Racing	(Switzerland) No. 25 Glorax Racing
3	Paul Ricard	(Italy) Mirko Bortolotti (Italy) Giovanni Venturini (South Africa) Adrian Zaugg	(United Kingdom) Alex Buncombe (Japan) Katsumasa Chiyo (Belgium) Wolfgang Reip	(Italy) Alessandro Bonacini (Poland) Michał Broniszewski (United Kingdom) Michael Lyons	(Russia) Andrey Birzhin (Italy) Fabio Mancini (Italy) Rino Mastronardi
4	Spa-Francorchamps	(Belgium) No. 2 Belgian Audi Club Team WRT	(Belgium) No. 46 BMW Sports Trophy Team Marc VDS	(Italy) No. 47 AF Corse	(United Kingdom) No. 24 Team Parker Racing
4	Spa-Francorchamps	(Switzerland) Nico Müller (Monaco) Stéphane Ortelli (Germany) Frank Stippler	(Netherlands) Nick Catsburg (Germany) Lucas Luhr (Finland) Markus Palttala	(Italy) Gianmaria Bruni (Thailand) Pasin Lathouras (Belgium) Stéphane Lémeret (Italy) Alessandro Pier Guidi	(United Kingdom) Ian Loggie (United Kingdom) Callum MacLeod (Denmark) Benny Simonsen (United Kingdom) Julian Westwood
5	Nürburgring	(Austria) No. 63 Grasser Racing Team	(New Zealand) No. 58 Von Ryan Racing	(Switzerland) No. 14 Emil Frey Racing	(France) No. 16 AKKA ASP
5	Nürburgring	(Italy) Mirko Bortolotti (Italy) Giovanni Venturini (South Africa) Adrian Zaugg	(United Kingdom) Rob Bell (France) Kévin Estre (New Zealand) Shane van Gisbergen	(Switzerland) Fredy Barth (Switzerland) Lorenz Frey (Switzerland) Gabriele Gardel	(France) Fabien Barthez (France) Anthony Pons

== Championship standings ==
Scoring system

Championship points were awarded for the first ten positions in each Championship Race. Entries were required to complete 75% of the winning car's race distance in order to be classified and earn points. Individual drivers were required to participate for a minimum of 25 minutes in order to earn championship points in any race. There were no points awarded for the Pole Position.

Championship Race points

Position	**1st**	**2nd**	**3rd**	**4th**	**5th**	**6th**	**7th**	**8th**	**9th**	**10th**
Points	25	18	15	12	10	8	6	4	2	1

1000 km Paul Ricard points

Position	**1st**	**2nd**	**3rd**	**4th**	**5th**	**6th**	**7th**	**8th**	**9th**	**10th**
Points	33	24	19	15	12	9	6	4	2	1

24 Hours of Spa points

Points were awarded after six hours, after twelve hours and at the finish.

Position	**1st**	**2nd**	**3rd**	**4th**	**5th**	**6th**	**7th**	**8th**	**9th**	**10th**
Points after 6hrs/12hrs	12	9	7	6	5	4	3	2	1	0
Points at the finish	25	18	15	12	10	8	6	4	2	1

=== Drivers' Championship ===
==== Pro Cup ====
Pos.	Driver	Team	MNZ (Italy)	SIL (United Kingdom)	LEC (France)	SPA (Belgium)			NÜR (Germany)	Total
Pos.	Driver	Team	MNZ (Italy)	SIL (United Kingdom)	LEC (France)	6hrs	12hrs	24hrs	NÜR (Germany)	Total
1	(United Kingdom) Alex Buncombe (Japan) Katsumasa Chiyo (Belgium) Wolfgang Reip	(United Kingdom) Nissan GT Academy Team RJN	8	**13**	1	25	25	15	3	62
2	(United Kingdom) Steven Kane (United Kingdom) Andy Meyrick (United Kingdom) Guy Smith	(United Kingdom) Bentley M-Sport	5	9	2	21	47	Ret	2	59
3	(Monaco) Stéphane Ortelli (Germany) Frank Stippler	(Belgium) Belgian Audi Club Team WRT	6	3	37	**9**	2	2	11	56
4	(United Kingdom) Rob Bell (France) Kévin Estre	(New Zealand) Von Ryan Racing	16	1	Ret	6	13	29	1	54
4	(New Zealand) Shane van Gisbergen	(New Zealand) Von Ryan Racing	16	1		6	13	29	1	54
5	(Germany) Lucas Luhr (Finland) Markus Palttala	(Belgium) BMW Sports Trophy Team Marc VDS			3	18	5	1		49
6	(Belgium) Laurens Vanthoor	(Belgium) Belgian Audi Club Team WRT	3	2	30	28	21	21	4	48
6	(Netherlands) Robin Frijns (France) Jean-Karl Vernay	(Belgium) Belgian Audi Club Team WRT	3	2	34	50	43	Ret	4	48
6	(Germany) Nico Bastian (Netherlands) Stef Dusseldorp	(Germany) Rowe Racing	11	10	4	1	1	16	19	48
7	(Spain) Daniel Juncadella	(Germany) Rowe Racing	15	11	4	1	1	16	19	42
8	(Switzerland) Nico Müller	(Belgium) Audi Sport Team WRT	6		34	**9**	2	2		41
9	(Belgium) Maxime Martin	(Belgium) BMW Sports Trophy Team Marc VDS			3	3	3	31		33
10	(Germany) Maximilian Buhk (Spain) Andy Soucek (Belgium) Maxime Soulet	(United Kingdom) Bentley M-Sport	13	6	12	10	4	Ret	5	31
11	(Netherlands) Nick Catsburg	(Belgium) BMW Sports Trophy Team Marc VDS				18	5	1		30
12	(Italy) Mirko Bortolotti (Italy) Giovanni Venturini (South Africa) Adrian Zaugg	(Austria) Grasser Racing Team	25	8	**6**	5	37	Ret	**6**	29
13	(Italy) Fabio Babini (Netherlands) Jeroen Mul (United States) Andrew Palmer	(Austria) Grasser Racing Team	**1**	17	Ret	7	46	Ret	13	28
14	(Germany) Christopher Mies	(Belgium) Belgian Audi Club Team WRT	Ret							23
14	(Germany) Christopher Mies	(Germany) Phoenix Racing			20	26	9	3		23
14	(Germany) Christopher Mies	(France) Saintéloc							7	23
14	(France) Greg Guilvert	(France) Saintéloc	9	12	23	2	42	Ret	7	23
15	(Italy) Marco Bonanomi (Czech Republic) Filip Salaquarda (Belgium) Frédéric Vervisch	(Czech Republic) ISR	20	4	9	51	51	Ret	12	18
15	(United Kingdom) Craig Dolby (United Kingdom) Martin Plowman (United Kingdom) Sean Walkinshaw	(Germany) MRS GT-Racing	12	5	42	53	53	Ret		18
15	(United Kingdom) Craig Dolby (United Kingdom) Martin Plowman (United Kingdom) Sean Walkinshaw	(United States) Always Evolving Motorsport							8	18
16	(Germany) Christian Mamerow	(Germany) Phoenix Racing	21			26	9	3		17
16	(Denmark) Nicki Thiim	(Germany) Phoenix Racing				26	9	3		17
16	(Sweden) Edward Sandström	(France) Saintéloc	9	12		2	42	Ret		17
17	(Monaco) Stéphane Richelmi	(Belgium) Belgian Audi Club Team WRT	Ret	3	37	50	43	Ret	11	15
18	(Brazil) Augusto Farfus (Germany) Dirk Werner	(Belgium) BMW Sports Trophy Team Marc VDS				3	3	31		14
19	(Switzerland) Marcel Fässler	(Germany) Phoenix Racing			20	27	11	5		13
19	(Germany) Mike Rockenfeller	(Belgium) Belgian Audi Club Team WRT			30					13
19	(Germany) Mike Rockenfeller	(Germany) Phoenix Racing				27	11	5		13
19	(Germany) André Lotterer	(Germany) Phoenix Racing				27	11	5		13
20	(France) Vincent Abril (France) Mike Parisy (Switzerland) Harold Primat	(Germany) Bentley Team HTP	46	Ret	36	32	16	9	Ret	10
20	(Saudi Arabia) Abdulaziz Bin Turki Al Faisal (Netherlands) Yelmer Buurman (Germany) Hubert Haupt	(Germany) Black Falcon	33	23	Ret	12	31	12	9	10
20	(Portugal) Álvaro Parente (United Kingdom) Adrian Quaife-Hobbs	(New Zealand) Von Ryan Racing	26	53	21	4	8	18	38	10
20	(Brazil) Bruno Senna	(New Zealand) Von Ryan Racing	26		21	4	8	18	38	10
21	(France) Morgan Moullin Traffort (Italy) Alessandro Pier Guidi (France) Tristan Vautier	(France) AKKA ASP			7				Ret	9
21	(Germany) Marc Basseng	(France) Saintéloc		12		2	42	Ret		9
22	(Italy) Edoardo Mortara	(France) Saintéloc	9		23					8
22	(Brazil) Felipe Fraga (Brazil) Sérgio Jimenez	(Brazil) BMW Sports Trophy Team Brasil	18	26	13	16	34	13	21	8
23	(Germany) Klaus Graf	(Germany) Rowe Racing	11	10						7
24	(Russia) Rinat Salikhov (Austria) Norbert Siedler	(Germany) Rinaldi Racing		7	Ret				14	6
24	(Germany) Marco Seefried	(Germany) Rinaldi Racing		7	Ret					6
24	(Spain) Miguel Molina	(France) Saintéloc							7	6
24	(Brazil) Cacá Bueno	(Brazil) BMW Sports Trophy Team Brasil	18	26		16	34	13	21	6
25	(Germany) Timo Glock (Canada) Bruno Spengler (Italy) Alex Zanardi	(Italy) ROAL Motorsport			Ret	13	7	25		4
26	(Brazil) Átila Abreu	(Brazil) BMW Sports Trophy Team Brasil	33	Ret	13				25	2
26	(Oman) Ahmad Al Harthy	(United Kingdom) Oman Racing Team	28	19	16				10	2
27	(Denmark) Nicolai Sylvest	(Germany) Rowe Racing	15	11	Ret				15	1
27	(Netherlands) Indy Dontje	(Germany) Rowe Racing	15	11	Ret					1
27	(United Kingdom) Jonathan Adam (United Kingdom) Daniel Lloyd	(United Kingdom) Oman Racing Team	28	19	16					1
27	(United Kingdom) Rory Butcher (Germany) Stefan Mücke	(United Kingdom) Oman Racing Team							10	1
	(Germany) Kenneth Heyer (Spain) Miguel Toril	(Germany) Car Collection Motorsport		29	18					0
	(Germany) Kenneth Heyer (Spain) Miguel Toril	(Germany) Rowe Racing							15	0
	(Germany) Robert Renauer	(Germany) Rinaldi Racing							14	0
	(Germany) Jan Seyffarth	(Germany) Car Collection Motorsport		29	18					0
	(Germany) Christopher Haase	(Germany) Phoenix Racing	21		20					0
	(Germany) Markus Winkelhock	(Germany) Phoenix Racing	21	34	40				30	0
	(Germany) Markus Winkelhock	(Belgium) Belgian Audi Club Team WRT				28	21	21		0
	(Germany) René Rast	(Belgium) Belgian Audi Club Team WRT			30	28	21	21		0
	(Germany) Pierre Kaffer (Germany) Steve Parrow (Germany) Dominik Schwager	(Germany) Black PearL by Rinaldi			22					0
	(France) Adrien Tambay	(France) Saintéloc			23					0
	(Brazil) Valdeno Brito	(Brazil) BMW Sports Trophy Team Brasil	32	Ret					25	0
	(Brazil) Matheus Stumpf	(Brazil) BMW Sports Trophy Team Brasil		Ret					25	0
	(Hong Kong) Marchy Lee (Hong Kong) Shaun Thong	(Germany) Phoenix Racing		34	40				30	0
	(Brazil) Ricardo Sperafico	(Brazil) BMW Sports Trophy Team Brasil	32							0
	(France) Nicolas Armindo (Portugal) Miguel Ramos (Switzerland) Fabien Thuner	(Germany) Attempto Racing	41	Ret						0
	(Finland) Antti Buri (Russia) Vadim Gitlin (United Kingdom) Oliver Webb	(Germany) Attempto Racing		42						0
	(France) Nicolas Lapierre	(New Zealand) Von Ryan Racing		53	Ret					0
	(Denmark) Anders Fjordbach (Italy) Fabio Onidi (Italy) Andrea Roda	(Czech Republic) ISR	DNS	55						0
	(South Africa) Kelvin van der Linde	(Belgium) Belgian Audi Club Team WRT	Ret							0
	(Austria) Dominik Baumann (Germany) Claudia Hürtgen (Germany) Max Sandritter	(Germany) BMW Sports Trophy Team Schubert		Ret						0
	(Germany) Thomas Jäger	(Germany) Rowe Racing			Ret					0
	(United Kingdom) Adam Christodoulou (Sweden) Andreas Simonsen (Belgium) Nico Verdonck	(Germany) Black Falcon				44	48	Ret		0

Key
Colour	Result
Gold	Race winner
Silver	2nd place
Bronze	3rd place
Green	Points finish
Blue	Non-points finish
Blue	Non-classified finish (NC)
Purple	Did not finish (Ret)
Black	Disqualified (DSQ)
Black	Excluded (EX)
White	Did not start (DNS)
White	Race cancelled (C)
White	Withdrew (WD)
Blank	Did not participate

**Bold** – Pole
Italics – Fastest Lap

==== Pro-Am Cup ====
Pos.	Driver	Team	MNZ (Italy)	SIL (United Kingdom)	LEC (France)	SPA (Belgium)			NÜR (Germany)	Total
Pos.	Driver	Team	CR	CR	CR	6hrs	12hrs	24hrs	CR	Total
1	(United Kingdom) Duncan Cameron (Republic of Ireland) Matt Griffin	(Italy) AF Corse	4	18	10	8	10	6	34	88
2	(Italy) Alessandro Bonacini (Poland) Michał Broniszewski (United Kingdom) Michael Lyons	(Switzerland) Kessel Racing	7	46	5	**45**	49	Ret	18	63
3	(Portugal) Francisco Guedes	(Italy) AF Corse			10	8	10	6	32	58
4	(United Kingdom) Stuart Leonard (United Kingdom) Michael Meadows	(United Kingdom) Leonard Motorsport AMR	30	14	26	33	15	10	22	53
5	(Estonia) Marko Asmer (Russia) Aleksey Vasilyev	(Russia) GT Russian Team	17	24	11	17	12	Ret	23	47
6	(Italy) Gianmaria Bruni (Thailand) Pasin Lathouras (Belgium) Stéphane Lémeret (Italy) Alessandro Pier Guidi	(Italy) AF Corse				11	6	4		46
7	(Switzerland) Fredy Barth (Switzerland) Lorenz Frey (Switzerland) Gabriele Gardel	(Switzerland) Emil Frey Racing	Ret	16	43	20	22	27	16	45
8	(Russia) Aleksey Karachev	(Russia) GT Russian Team	19	20	11	52	52	Ret	20	43
9	(Italy) Davide Rigon	(Italy) AF Corse				8	10	6		39
10	(United Kingdom) Paul Wilson	(United Kingdom) Leonard Motorsport AMR	30	14	26				22	38
11	(Belgium) Adrien de Leener (Monaco) Cédric Sbirrazzuoli	(Italy) AF Corse	31	25	17	46	24	11	17	34
12	(Russia) Rinat Salikhov (Austria) Norbert Siedler	(Germany) Rinaldi Racing	**2**			37	27	24		31
13	(Germany) Maro Engel (United States) Sean Johnston (United Kingdom) Oliver Morley	(Germany) Black Falcon	38	DNS	8	30	35	Ret	24	30
14	(Mexico) Ricardo Sánchez	(United Kingdom) Nissan GT Academy Team RJN	Ret	15	**35**	36	19	26	**Ret**	24
14	(France) Gaëtan Paletou	(United Kingdom) Nissan GT Academy Team RJN		15	**35**	36	19	26	**Ret**	24
14	(Netherlands) Indy Dontje	(Russia) GT Russian Team				17	12	Ret	20	24
15	(United Kingdom) Oliver Bryant (United Kingdom) Alasdair McCaig (United Kingdom) Devon Modell	(United Kingdom) Ecurie Ecosse	34	31	39	23	14	7	28	23
16	(United Kingdom) Alexander Sims	(United Kingdom) Ecurie Ecosse				23	14	7		22
16	(Denmark) Dennis Andersen (Denmark) Martin Jensen	(Denmark) Insightracing with Flex-Box	14	39	14	34	40	Ret	41	22
16	(Czech Republic) Dennis Waszek	(Russia) GT Russian Team		20					20	22
17	(United Kingdom) Jonny Cocker (Russia) Leo Machitski	Team Russia by Barwell	Ret	30		15	20	8	44	19
17	(United Kingdom) Phil Keen (United Kingdom) Jon Minshaw	Team Russia by Barwell				15	20	8		19
18	(United Kingdom) Jann Mardenborough	(United Kingdom) Nissan GT Academy Team RJN		15						18
18	(France) Eric Dermont (France) Henry Hassid (France) Franck Perera	(France) TDS Racing	Ret	21	Ret	14	18	Ret	31	18
19	(Germany) Stefan Mücke (United Kingdom) Tom Onslow-Cole	(United Kingdom) Leonard Motorsport AMR				33	15	10		15
20	(France) Enzo Guibbert (France) Gilles Vannelet	(France) Sport Garage	Ret	32	15	49	39	28	26	14
20	(France) Sacha Bottemane (Netherlands) Max Koebolt (Netherlands) Pieter Schothorst	(Belgium) Team WRT	36	22	19	22	44	Ret	27	14
21	(France) Arno Santamato	(France) Sport Garage	Ret	32	15				26	13
22	(Italy) Marco Cioci (Italy) Piergiuseppe Perazzini	(Italy) AF Corse	10	51	38	54	54	Ret	32	12
22	(Venezuela) Enzo Potolicchio	(Italy) AF Corse	10	51	38	54	54	Ret		12
22	(United Arab Emirates) Karim Al Azhari	(Russia) GT Russian Team		24					23	12
22	(United Kingdom) Lewis Plato	(Russia) GT Russian Team				17	12	Ret		12
23	(France) Christophe Bouchut	(Russia) GT Russian Team		20		52	52	Ret		10
23	(Switzerland) Mathias Beche	(France) TDS Racing				14	18	Ret		10
24	(Italy) Raffaele Giammaria (Finland) Toni Vilander	(Italy) AF Corse				46	24	11		8
25	(Germany) Bernd Schneider	(Russia) GT Russian Team	19							6
25	(Germany) Bernd Schneider	(Germany) Black Falcon				30	35	Ret		6
25	(Germany) Marco Seefried (Belgium) Stef Van Campenhout	(Germany) Rinaldi Racing				37	27	24		6
25	(Germany) Florian Strauss	(United Kingdom) Nissan GT Academy Team RJN	Ret			36	19	26		6
25	(France) Olivier Pla	(United Kingdom) Nissan GT Academy Team RJN				36	19	26		6
26	(Switzerland) Jonathan Hirschi	(France) Classic & Modern Racing			Ret					5
26	(Switzerland) Jonathan Hirschi	(Switzerland) Emil Frey Racing				20	22	27		5
27	(Germany) Steve Parrow	(Germany) Black PearL by Rinaldi	22	36					33	4
27	(Germany) Pierre Kaffer	(Germany) Black PearL by Rinaldi	22	36						4
27	(United Kingdom) Jonathan Adam (Oman) Ahmad Al Harthy (United Kingdom) Daniel Lloyd (Australia) Jonathan Venter	(United Kingdom) Oman Racing Team				24	17	30		4
27	(Belgium) Louis Machiels (Austria) Clemens Schmid (Netherlands) Max van Splunteren	(Germany) Bentley Team HTP				19	45	Ret		4
28	(France) Maurice Ricci	(France) AKKA ASP	23	35						2
28	(France) Gabriel Balthazard (France) Tristan Vautier	(France) AKKA ASP	23							2
28	(United Kingdom) James Nash	(Belgium) Belgian Audi Club Team WRT		43		22	44	Ret		2
29	(United Kingdom) Lee Mowle (United Kingdom) Joe Osborne (United Kingdom) Ryan Ratcliffe	(United Kingdom) Triple Eight Racing	45	**27**	Ret	48	50	Ret	29	1
29	(Sweden) Henrik Hedman (United States) Elton Julian (Italy) Thomas Kemenater	(United States) DragonSpeed	37	49	29	38	36	Ret	51	1
29	(France) Éric Cayrolle (Italy) Gabriele Lancieri	(France) Sport Garage				49	39	28		1
	(France) Jean-Luc Beaubelique (France) Philippe Giauque (France) Morgan Moullin Traffort	(France) AKKA ASP	Ret	28						0
	(Russia) Timur Sardarov	Team Russia by Barwell	Ret	30					44	0
	(Germany) Peter Schmidt	(Germany) Car Collection Motorsport	Ret		32				49	0
	(Germany) Pierre Ehret (Netherlands) Renger van der Zande	(Germany) Car Collection Motorsport			32					0
	(Germany) Dominik Schwager	(Germany) Black PearL by Rinaldi							33	0
	(France) Ludovic Badey	(France) AKKA ASP		35						0
	(Russia) Mark Shulzhitskiy	(United Kingdom) Nissan GT Academy Team RJN			**35**					0
	(United Kingdom) Bradley Ellis (United Kingdom) Euan Hankey (Turkey) Salih Yoluç	(United Kingdom) TF Sport							39	0
	(France) David Hallyday	(Belgium) Belgian Audi Club Team WRT		43					40	0
	(France) Christophe Hamon (France) Lonni Martins	(Belgium) Belgian Audi Club Team WRT							40	0
	(France) Phillippe Gaillard	(Belgium) Belgian Audi Club Team WRT		43						0
	(Italy) Alessandro Balzan (Japan) Yoshiharu Mori (Italy) Ronnie Valori	(Germany) Attempto Racing	48							0
	(France) Grégoire Demoustier (France) Gilles Lallemant (France) Marc Rostan	(France) Saintéloc							48	0
	(Switzerland) Daniel Allemann (Austria) Karl Wendlinger	(Germany) Car Collection Motorsport							49	0
	(Germany) Kenneth Heyer (Spain) Miguel Toril	(Germany) Car Collection Motorsport	Ret							0
	(Germany) Kenneth Heyer (Spain) Miguel Toril	(Russia) GT Russian Team				52	52	Ret		0
	(Germany) Marc Gassner	(United Kingdom) Nissan GT Academy Team RJN	Ret							0
	(Switzerland) Pierre Hirschi (Belgium) Christian Kelders	(France) Classic & Modern Racing			Ret					0
	(Argentina) Juan Cruz Álvarez (Argentina) Gustavo Borches (Turkey) Sergio Alejandro Yazbil	(Germany) Attempto Racing			Ret					0
	(Ukraine) Sergey Chukanov (Russia) Vadim Gitlin (Portugal) Miguel Ramos	(Germany) Attempto Racing			Ret					0
	(United Kingdom) Ryan Dalziel (United States) Anthony Lazzaro	(United States) DragonSpeed				38	36	Ret		0
	(Denmark) Anders Fjordbach	(Denmark) Insightracing with Flex-Box				34	40	Ret		0
	(Italy) Andrea Piccini	(Switzerland) Kessel Racing				**45**	49	Ret		0
	(Germany) Dirk Müller	(United Kingdom) Triple Eight Racing				48	50	Ret		0
	(Italy) Michele Rugolo	(Italy) AF Corse				54	54	Ret		0
	(Belgium) Marc Duez (Belgium) Jean-Michel Martin (Belgium) Eric van de Poele (Belgium) Pascal Witmeur	(Belgium) BMW Racing Against Cancer				55	55	Ret		0
	(United Kingdom) Harry Tincknell	(United Kingdom) Nissan GT Academy Team RJN							**Ret**	0

==== Am Cup ====
Pos.	Driver	Team	MNZ (Italy)	SIL (United Kingdom)	LEC (France)	SPA (Belgium)			NÜR (Germany)	Total
Pos.	Driver	Team	CR	CR	CR	6hrs	12hrs	24hrs	CR	Total
1	(United Kingdom) Ian Loggie (United Kingdom) Julian Westwood	(United Kingdom) Team Parker Racing	35	41	Ret	29	23	14	43	81
2	(Germany) Jürgen Häring (Greece) Dimitrios Konstantinou (Germany) Frank Schmickler	(Germany) Attempto Racing	40	40	31	39	26	17	37	80
3	(United States) Stephen Earle (Australia) Liam Talbot (Italy) Marco Zanuttini	(Switzerland) Kessel Racing	24	DNS	44	41	28	19	42	67
4	(Russia) Andrey Birzhin (Italy) Fabio Mancini (Italy) Rino Mastronardi	(Switzerland) Glorax Racing	**29**	37	**24**					66
5	(Luxembourg) Olivier Grotz (Saudi Arabia) Karim Ojjeh	(Belgium) Boutsen Ginion	Ret	33	27	56	56	Ret	36	62
6	(France) Fabien Barthez (France) Anthony Pons	(France) AKKA ASP	27	**Ret**	28				35	58
7	(Denmark) Benny Simonsen	(United Kingdom) Team Parker Racing			Ret	29	23	14		49
7	(United Kingdom) Callum MacLeod	(United Kingdom) Team Parker Racing				29	23	14		49
8	(Germany) Philipp Wlazik	(Germany) Attempto Racing				39	26	17		33
9	(France) Tony Samon	(France) Sport Garage		38		40	32	23		32
10	(France) Marc Rostan	(France) Saintéloc		50						27
10	(France) Marc Rostan	(Switzerland) Kessel Racing				41	28	19		27
11	(France) Jean-Philippe Belloc (France) Christophe Bourret (France) Pascal Gibon (France) Philippe Polette	(France) AKKA ASP				**35**	29	20		25
12	(Russia) Leo Machitski (Russia) Timur Sardarov	Team Russia by Barwell			25					24
13	(France) Pierre Etienne Bordet (France) Alexandre Viron	(Belgium) Delahaye Racing Team	Ret	47	Ret	43	33	22	47	23
13	(France) Emmanuel Orgeval	(Belgium) Delahaye Racing Team		47	Ret	43	33	22	47	23
14	(Germany) Pierre Ehret (Germany) Alexander Mattschull	(Germany) Car Collection Motorsport	42	45					**45**	20
14	(Russia) Garry Kondakov (Russia) Alexander Moiseev (Italy) Riccardo Ragazzi	(Italy) AF Corse	46	54	DNS	31	38	32	50	20
15	(France) Jean-Marc Bachelier (Italy) Howard Blank (France) Yannick Mallegol	(Italy) AF Corse	39	44	Ret					18
16	(France) Christian Beroujon (Belgium) Christoff Corten (France) Marc Guillot	(France) Sport Garage				40	32	23		17
16	(Portugal) Rui Águas	(Italy) AF Corse				31	38	32		17
17	(France) Christophe Hamon (France) Luc Paillard	(France) Sport Garage		38						15
17	(France) Paul-Loup Chatin	(Belgium) Delahaye Racing Team				43	33	22		15
18	(France) Jean-Luc Blanchemain (Switzerland) Pierre Hirschi	(France) Classic & Modern Racing	44	48		42	30	Ret	Ret	12
19	(Belgium) Christian Kelders	(France) Classic & Modern Racing	44			42	30	Ret	Ret	10
20	(France) Sylvain Debs (United Arab Emirates) Bashar Mardini (France) Nicolas Misslin	(France) Sport Garage			33					9
21	(Belgium) Frédéric Bouvy	(France) Classic & Modern Racing				42	30	Ret		8
22	(Netherlands) Martin Lanting (Belgium) Louis-Philippe Soenen (Belgium) Patrick Van Glabeke	(Italy) AF Corse			41					6
22	(France) Jean-Luc Beaubelique (France) Maurice Ricci	(France) AKKA ASP			Ret				46	6
23	(France) Jean-Paul Buffin (France) Georges Cabanne	(France) Saintéloc	43	52	Ret					4
23	(France) Marc Sourd	(France) Saintéloc	43							4
24	(France) Thomas Nicolle	(France) Classic & Modern Racing		48						2
24	(France) Gilles Lallemant	(France) Saintéloc		52	Ret	47	41	Ret		2
24	(France) Michael Blanchemain (Italy) Beniamino Caccia (France) Philippe Haezebrouck	(France) Saintéloc				47	41	Ret		2
25	(France) Claude-Yves Gosselin (France) Jean-Claude Lagniez	(France) Saintéloc		50						1
	(France) Philippe Giauque	(France) AKKA ASP			Ret					0
	(South Africa) Jordan Grogor (Germany) Werner Hamprecht	(Belgium) Boutsen Ginion				56	56	Ret		0
	(France) Romain Brandela (France) Eric Clément (Belgium) Bernard Delhez (France) Gilles Duqueine	(France) Duqueine Engineering				57	57	Ret		0

=== Teams' Championship ===
==== Pro Cup ====
Pos.	Team	Car	MNZ (Italy)	SIL (United Kingdom)	LEC (France)	SPA (Belgium)			NÜR (Germany)	Total
Pos.	Team	Car	CR	CR	CR	6hrs	12hrs	24hrs	CR	Total
1	(Belgium) Belgian Audi Club Team WRT	Audi	3	2	30	**9**	2	2	4	79
2	(United Kingdom) Bentley M-Sport	Bentley	5	6	2	10	4	Ret	2	76
3	(United Kingdom) Nissan GT Academy Team RJN	Nissan	8	**13**	1	25	25	15	3	68
4	(New Zealand) Von Ryan Racing	McLaren	16	1	21	4	8	18	1	66
5	(Belgium) BMW Sports Trophy Team Marc VDS	BMW			3	3	3	1		58
6	(Austria) Grasser Racing Team	Lamborghini	**1**	8	**6**	5	37	Ret	**6**	58
7	(Germany) Rowe Racing/Team Astana by Rowe	Mercedes-Benz	11	10	4	1	1	16	15	55
8	(France) Saintéloc	Audi	9	12	23	2	42	Ret	7	29
9	(Czech Republic) ISR	Audi	20	4	9	51	51	Ret	12	23
10	(Germany) Phoenix Racing	Audi	21	34	20	26	9	3	30	18
10	(Germany) MRS GT-Racing	Nissan	12	5	42	53	53	Ret		18
11	(Germany) Black Falcon	Mercedes-Benz	33	23	Ret	12	31	12	9	16
12	(Germany) Bentley Team HTP	Bentley	46	Ret	36	32	16	9	Ret	14
12	(Brazil) BMW Sports Trophy Team Brasil	BMW	18	26	13	16	34	13	21	14
13	(France) AKKA ASP	Ferrari			7				Ret	9
14	(Germany) Rinaldi Racing	Ferrari		7	Ret				14	8
15	(Italy) ROAL Motorsport	BMW			Ret	13	7	25		7
16	(United States) Always Evolving Motorsport	Nissan							8	6
17	Oman Racing Team	Aston Martin	28	19	16				10	2
18	(Germany) Car Collection Motorsport	Mercedes-Benz		29	18					1
	(Germany) Attempto Racing	McLaren	41	42						0
	(Germany) Black PearL Racing by Rinaldi	Ferrari			22					0
	(Germany) BMW Sports Trophy Team Schubert	BMW		Ret						0

==== Pro-Am Cup ====
Pos.	Team	Car	MNZ (Italy)	SIL (United Kingdom)	LEC (France)	SPA (Belgium)			NÜR (Germany)	Total
Pos.	Team	Car	CR	CR	CR	6hrs	12hrs	24hrs	CR	Total
1	(Italy) AF Corse	Ferrari	4	18	10	8	6	4	17	116
2	(Switzerland) Kessel Racing	Ferrari	**7**	46	5	**45**	49	Ret	18	63
3	(Russia) GT Russian Team	Mercedes-Benz	17	20	11	17	12	Ret	20	62
4	(United Kingdom) Leonard Motorsport AMR	Aston Martin	30	14	26	33	15	10	22	61
5	(Switzerland) Emil Frey Racing	Jaguar	Ret	16	43	20	22	27	16	51
6	(Germany) Rinaldi Racing	Ferrari	2			37	27	24		35
7	(Germany) Black Falcon	Mercedes-Benz	38	DNS	8	30	35	Ret	24	32
7	(United Kingdom) Ecurie Ecosse	BMW	34	31	39	23	14	7	28	32
8	(United Kingdom) Nissan GT Academy Team RJN	Nissan	Ret	15	**35**	36	19	26	**Ret**	29
9	Team Russia by Barwell	BMW	Ret	30		15	30	8	44	26
10	Insight Racing Denmark	Ferrari	14	39	14	34	40	Ret	41	24
11	(France) TDS Racing	BMW	Ret	21	Ret	14	18	Ret	31	21
12	(Belgium) Belgian Audi Club Team WRT	Audi	36	22	19	22	45	Ret	27	20
13	(France) Sport Garage	Ferrari	Ret	32	15	49	39	28	26	19
14	(France) AKKA ASP	Ferrari	23	28						10
15	(Germany) Black PearL Racing by Rinaldi	Ferrari	22	36					33	8
15	(United Kingdom) Oman Racing Team	Aston Martin				24	17	30		8
16	(United Kingdom) Triple Eight Racing	BMW	45	**27**	Ret	48	50	Ret	29	7
17	(Germany) Bentley Team HTP	Bentley				19	45	Ret		5
18	(United States) DragonSpeed	Ferrari	37	49	29	38	36	Ret	51	2
19	(Germany) Car Collection Motorsport	Mercedes-Benz	Ret		32				49	1
	(United Kingdom) TF Sport	Aston Martin							39	0
	(Germany) Attempto Racing	McLaren	48		Ret					0
	(France) Saintéloc	Audi							48	0
	(France) Classic & Modern Racing	BMW			Ret					0
	(Belgium) BMW Racing Against Cancer	BMW				55	55	Ret		0

==== Am Cup ====
Pos.	Team	Car	MNZ (Italy)	SIL (United Kingdom)	LEC (France)	SPA (Belgium)			NÜR (Germany)	Total
Pos.	Team	Car	CR	CR	CR	6hrs	12hrs	24hrs	CR	Total
1	(France) AKKA ASP	Ferrari	27	**Ret**	28	**35**	29	20	35	83
2	(United Kingdom) Team Parker Racing	Audi	35	41	Ret	29	23	14	43	81
3	(Germany) Attempto Racing	McLaren	40	40	31	39	26	17	37	80
4	(Switzerland) Kessel Racing	Ferrari	24	DNS	44	41	28	19	42	67
5	(Switzerland) Glorax Racing	Ferrari	**29**	37	**24**					58
6	(Belgium) Boutsen Ginion	BMW	Ret	33	27	56	56	Ret	36	62
7	(Italy) AF Corse	Ferrari	39	44	41	31	38	32	50	45
8	(France) Sport Garage	Ferrari		38	33	40	32	23		41
9	(Belgium) Delahaye Racing Team	Porsche	Ret	47	Ret	43	33	22	47	25
10	Team Russia by Barwell	BMW			25					18
11	(Germany) Car Collection Motorsport	Mercedes-Benz	42	45					**45**	20
12	(France) Classic & Modern Racing	BMW	44	48		42	30	Ret	Ret	12
13	(France) Saintéloc	Audi	43	50	Ret	47	41	Ret		7
	(France) Duqueine Engineering	Ferrari				57	57	Ret		0

== See also ==
- 2015 Blancpain GT Series
- 2015 Blancpain Sprint Series
