= 2016 Renault Sport Trophy =

Motor racing season

Seasons
- ← 2015 none →

The 2016 Renault Sport Trophy was the second and final season of the Renault–supported sports car category, a one-make racing series that is part of the Renault Sport Series. The season began at Ciudad del Motor de Aragón on 16 April and finished on 23 October at Autódromo do Estoril. The series forms part of the Renault Sport Series meetings at six triple header events.

== Teams and drivers ==
Team	No.	Drivers	Class	Rounds
(Italy) Oregon Team	1	(Italy) Dario Capitanio	Pro	All
(Italy) Oregon Team	1	(Italy) Davide Roda	Am	All
(Italy) Oregon Team	4	(Brazil) Bruno Bonifacio	Pro	1–4
(Italy) Oregon Team	4	(Italy) David Fumanelli	Pro	5–6
(Italy) Oregon Team	4	(Colombia) Andrés Méndez	Am	All
(Italy) Oregon Team	5	(Italy) David Fumanelli	Pro	1–4
(Italy) Oregon Team	5	(Brazil) Rodrigo Baptista	Pro	5
(Italy) Oregon Team	5	(Portugal) Pedro Moleiro	Pro	6
(Italy) Oregon Team	5	(United Kingdom) Ash Hand	Am	1–2
(Italy) Oregon Team	5	(Italy) "Due"	Am	3–4
(Italy) Oregon Team	5	(Brazil) Adalberto Baptista	Am	5–6
(France) R-ace GP	2	(United Kingdom) Raoul Owens	Pro	All
(France) R-ace GP	2	(Spain) Toni Forné	Am	1–2
(France) R-ace GP	2	(France) Jean-Marc Merlin	Am	3
(France) R-ace GP	2	(Sweden) Frederik Blomstedt	Am	4–6
(France) R-ace GP	3	(Estonia) Kevin Korjus (Note: Kevin Korjus raced round 4 without a partner in the Am category. Therefore, the #3 car only took part in the Pro Sprint race.)	Pro	All
(France) R-ace GP	3	(Sweden) Frederik Blomstedt	Am	1–3
(France) R-ace GP	3	(France) Philippe Haezebrouck	Am	5–6
(Netherlands) V8 Racing	6	(South Africa) Jordan Grogor	Pro	1, 3–5
(Netherlands) V8 Racing	6	(United Kingdom) Josh Webster	Pro	2, 6
(Netherlands) V8 Racing	6	(Spain) Carmen Jordá	Am	1–5
(Netherlands) V8 Racing	6	(Germany) Oliver Freymuth	Am	6
(Netherlands) V8 Racing	7	(Netherlands) Nicky Pastorelli	Pro	All
(Netherlands) V8 Racing	7	(Netherlands) Jelle Bellen	Am	All
(Netherlands) V8 Racing	8	(Netherlands) Meindert van Buuren	Pro	1–2, 5
(Netherlands) V8 Racing	8	(Netherlands) Duncan Huisman	Pro	3
(Netherlands) V8 Racing	8	(Netherlands) Max Braams	Am	1, 3
(Netherlands) V8 Racing	8	(Germany) Oliver Freymuth	Am	2
(Netherlands) V8 Racing	8	(Netherlands) Diederik Sijthoff	Am	5
(Spain) Team Marc VDS EG 0,0	9	(Finland) Markus Palttala	Pro	1–3, 5–6
(Spain) Team Marc VDS EG 0,0	9	(Belgium) Renaud Kuppens	Pro	4
(Spain) Team Marc VDS EG 0,0	9	(Germany) Fabian Schiller	Am	All
(Spain) Team Marc VDS EG 0,0	15	(Thailand) Tanart Sathienthirakul	Pro	All
(Spain) Team Marc VDS EG 0,0	15	(Spain) Fran Rueda	Am	All
(Denmark) High Class Racing	11	(Denmark) Anders Fjordbach	Pro	All
(Denmark) High Class Racing	11	(Denmark) Dennis Andersen	Am	All
(France) Duqueine Engineering	16	(Colombia) Diego Mejía	Pro	3
(France) Duqueine Engineering	16	(France) Nelson Panciatici	Pro	4, 6
(France) Duqueine Engineering	16	(Poland) Robert Kubica	Pro	5
(France) Duqueine Engineering	16	(United Kingdom) Ben Anderson	Am	3
(France) Duqueine Engineering	16	(France) Gilles Duqueine	Am	4
(France) Duqueine Engineering	16	(France) Christophe Hamon	Am	5
(France) Duqueine Engineering	16	(France) Thierry Soave	Am	6
(France) Duqueine Engineering	17	(France) Lonni Martins	Pro	3–6
(France) Duqueine Engineering	17	(France) Christophe Hamon	Am	3–4, 6
(France) Duqueine Engineering	17	(France) Philippe Bourgois	Am	5
(Netherlands) Equipe Verschuur	19	(Netherlands) Roy Geerts	Pro	1–3
(Netherlands) Equipe Verschuur	19	(Netherlands) Mike Verschuur	Pro	4
(Netherlands) Equipe Verschuur	19	(Netherlands) Steijn Schothorst	Pro	5–6
(Netherlands) Equipe Verschuur	19	(Portugal) Miguel Ramos	Am	All
(Netherlands) Equipe Verschuur	21	(Netherlands) Pieter Schothorst	Pro	All
(Netherlands) Equipe Verschuur	21	(Netherlands) Jeroen Schothorst	Am	All
(United Kingdom) Strakka Racing	42	(United Kingdom) Lewis Williamson	Pro	1–2
(United Kingdom) Strakka Racing	42	(United Kingdom) Tim Sugden	Am	1
(United Kingdom) Strakka Racing	42	(United Kingdom) Nick Leventis	Am	2

== Race calendar and results ==
The provisional calendar for the 2016 season was announced on 5 September 2015. Rounds at Imola, Spielberg, Le Castellet and Estoril will début in the series' calendar. All rounds will be collaboration with European Le Mans Series, except Aragón which will feature the Formula 3.5 V8.

Round			Circuit	Date	Pole position	Fastest lap	Winning driver	Winning team
1	En	IntP	(Spain) Ciudad del Motor de Aragón, Alcañiz	16 April	(United Kingdom) Lewis Williamson (United Kingdom) Tim Sugden	(United Kingdom) Lewis Williamson	(United Kingdom) Lewis Williamson	(United Kingdom) Strakka Racing
1	En	Fin	(Spain) Ciudad del Motor de Aragón, Alcañiz	16 April	(United Kingdom) Lewis Williamson (United Kingdom) Tim Sugden	(United Kingdom) Lewis Williamson (United Kingdom) Tim Sugden	(Finland) Markus Palttala (Germany) Fabian Schiller	(Spain) Team Marc VDS EG 0,0
1	Am		(Spain) Ciudad del Motor de Aragón, Alcañiz	17 April	(Germany) Fabian Schiller	(United Kingdom) Tim Sugden	(Germany) Fabian Schiller	(Spain) Team Marc VDS EG 0,0
1	Pro		(Spain) Ciudad del Motor de Aragón, Alcañiz	17 April	(United Kingdom) Lewis Williamson	(Finland) Markus Palttala	(Estonia) Kevin Korjus	(France) R-ace GP
2	En	IntA	(Italy) Autodromo Enzo e Dino Ferrari, Imola	14 May	(Estonia) Kevin Korjus (Sweden) Fredrik Blomstedt	(Sweden) Fredrik Blomstedt	(Germany) Fabian Schiller	(Spain) Team Marc VDS EG 0,0
2	En	Fin	(Italy) Autodromo Enzo e Dino Ferrari, Imola	14 May	(Estonia) Kevin Korjus (Sweden) Fredrik Blomstedt	(Netherlands) Pieter Schothorst (Netherlands) Jeroen Schothorst	(Estonia) Kevin Korjus (Sweden) Fredrik Blomstedt	(France) R-ace GP
2	Am		(Italy) Autodromo Enzo e Dino Ferrari, Imola	15 May	(Sweden) Fredrik Blomstedt	(Sweden) Fredrik Blomstedt	(Germany) Fabian Schiller	(Spain) Team Marc VDS EG 0,0
2	Pro		(Italy) Autodromo Enzo e Dino Ferrari, Imola	15 May	(Brazil) Bruno Bonifacio	(Netherlands) Pieter Schothorst	(Brazil) Bruno Bonifacio	(Italy) Oregon Team
3	En	IntP	(Austria) Red Bull Ring, Spielberg	16 July	(Netherlands) Pieter Schothorst (Netherlands) Jeroen Schothorst	(Netherlands) Pieter Schothorst	(Netherlands) Pieter Schothorst	(Netherlands) Equipe Verschuur
3	En	Fin	(Austria) Red Bull Ring, Spielberg	16 July	(Netherlands) Pieter Schothorst (Netherlands) Jeroen Schothorst	(Netherlands) Pieter Schothorst (Netherlands) Jeroen Schothorst	(Finland) Markus Palttala (Germany) Fabian Schiller	(Spain) Team Marc VDS EG 0,0
3	Am		(Austria) Red Bull Ring, Spielberg	17 July	(Germany) Fabian Schiller	(Portugal) Miguel Ramos	(Spain) Fran Rueda	(Spain) Team Marc VDS EG 0,0
3	Pro		(Austria) Red Bull Ring, Spielberg	17 July	(Netherlands) Pieter Schothorst	(Netherlands) Pieter Schothorst	(Netherlands) Pieter Schothorst	(Netherlands) Equipe Verschuur
4	En	IntA	(France) Circuit Paul Ricard, Le Castellet	27 August	(Thailand) Tanart Sathienthirakul (Spain) Fran Rueda	(Germany) Fabian Schiller	(Spain) Fran Rueda	(Spain) Team Marc VDS EG 0,0
4	En	Fin	(France) Circuit Paul Ricard, Le Castellet	27 August	(Thailand) Tanart Sathienthirakul (Spain) Fran Rueda	(Netherlands) Pieter Schothorst (Netherlands) Jeroen Schothorst	(Thailand) Tanart Sathienthirakul (Spain) Fran Rueda	(Spain) Team Marc VDS EG 0,0
4	Am		(France) Circuit Paul Ricard, Le Castellet	28 August	(Spain) Fran Rueda	(Germany) Fabian Schiller	(Sweden) Fredrik Blomstedt	(France) R-ace GP
4	Pro		(France) Circuit Paul Ricard, Le Castellet	28 August	(Italy) David Fumanelli	(Netherlands) Pieter Schothorst	(Netherlands) Pieter Schothorst	(Netherlands) Equipe Verschuur
5	En	IntA	(Belgium) Circuit de Spa-Francorchamps, Spa	24 September	(Finland) Markus Palttala (Germany) Fabian Schiller	(Germany) Fabian Schiller	(Germany) Fabian Schiller	(Spain) Team Marc VDS EG 0,0
5	En	Fin	(Belgium) Circuit de Spa-Francorchamps, Spa	24 September	(Finland) Markus Palttala (Germany) Fabian Schiller	(Netherlands) Pieter Schothorst (Netherlands) Jeroen Schothorst	(United Kingdom) Raoul Owens (Sweden) Fredrik Blomstedt	(France) R-ace GP
5	Am		(Belgium) Circuit de Spa-Francorchamps, Spa	25 September	(Germany) Fabian Schiller	(Germany) Fabian Schiller	(Germany) Fabian Schiller	(Spain) Team Marc VDS EG 0,0
5	Pro		(Belgium) Circuit de Spa-Francorchamps, Spa	25 September	(Netherlands) Pieter Schothorst	(Netherlands) Pieter Schothorst	(Netherlands) Pieter Schothorst	(Netherlands) Equipe Verschuur
6	En	IntP	(Portugal) Autódromo do Estoril	22 October	(Netherlands) Steijn Schothorst (Portugal) Miguel Ramos	(Netherlands) Steijn Schothorst	(Netherlands) Steijn Schothorst	(Netherlands) Equipe Verschuur
6	En	Fin	(Portugal) Autódromo do Estoril	22 October	(Netherlands) Steijn Schothorst (Portugal) Miguel Ramos	(Netherlands) Steijn Schothorst (Portugal) Miguel Ramos	(Netherlands) Steijn Schothorst (Portugal) Miguel Ramos	(Netherlands) Equipe Verschuur
6	Am		(Portugal) Autódromo do Estoril	23 October	(Germany) Fabian Schiller	(Sweden) Fredrik Blomstedt	(Germany) Fabian Schiller	(Spain) Team Marc VDS EG 0,0
6	Pro		(Portugal) Autódromo do Estoril	23 October	(Netherlands) Steijn Schothorst	(Netherlands) Steijn Schothorst	(Netherlands) Steijn Schothorst	(Netherlands) Equipe Verschuur

== Championship standings ==
=== Pro Class ===
Pos.	Driver	ALC (Spain)		IMO (Italy)	RBR (Austria)		CPR (France)	SPA (Belgium)	EST (Portugal)		Pts.
Pos.	Driver	En	Pro	Pro	En	Pro	Pro	Pro	En	Pro	Pts.
1	(Netherlands) Pieter Schothorst	3	10	Ret	**1**	**1**	1	**1**	Ret	4	156
2	(Estonia) Kevin Korjus	5	1	3	5	6	Ret	3	Ret	2	111
3	(Finland) Markus Palttala	4	3	Ret	2	2		5	2	5	105
4	(Italy) David Fumanelli	9	5	2	6	3	**2**	Ret	6	3	95
5	(Thailand) Tanart Sathienthirakul	7	9	8	4	5	Ret	8	3	10	52
6	(United Kingdom) Lewis Williamson	**1**	**2**	DSQ							43
7	(France) Lonni Martins				Ret	4	6	Ret	5	8	38
8	(Brazil) Bruno Bonifacio	Ret	11	**1**	Ret	DSQ	4				37
9	(United Kingdom) Raoul Owens	6	Ret	10	8	Ret	5	7	Ret	9	37
10	(Netherlands) Nicky Pastorelli	2	8	5	Ret	Ret	10	Ret	8	12	35
11	(United Kingdom) Josh Webster			6					4	7	34
12	(South Africa) Jordan Grogor	8	6		10	7	9	4			33
13	(Italy) Dario Capitanio	Ret	Ret	4	7	Ret	7	10	Ret	13	30
14	(France) Nelson Panciatici						3		8	6	29
15	(Netherlands) Roy Geerts	10	4	Ret	3	Ret					28
16	(Denmark) Anders Fjordbach	Ret	12	9	Ret	Ret	11	Ret	9	11	13
17	(Netherlands) Meindert van Buuren	Ret	7	7				DNS			12
18	(Belgium) Renaud Kuppens						8				4
19	(Netherlands) Duncan Huisman				9	Ret					2
20	(Colombia) Diego Mejía				11	Ret					0
21	(Netherlands) Mike Verschuur						Ret				0
Guest drivers ineligible for points
	(Netherlands) Steijn Schothorst							2	**1**	**1**	0
	(Poland) Robert Kubica							4			0
	(Brazil) Rodrigo Baptista							9			0
	(Portugal) Pedro Moleiro								Ret	14	0
Pos.	Driver	En	Pro	Pro	En	Pro	Pro	Pro	En	Pro	Pts.
Pos.	Driver	ALC (Spain)		IMO (Italy)	RBR (Austria)		CPR (France)	SPA (Belgium)	EST (Portugal)		Pts.

Colour	Result
Gold	Winner
Silver	Second place
Bronze	Third place
Green	Points classification
Blue	Non-points classification
Blue	Non-classified finish (NC)
Purple	Retired, not classified (Ret)
Red	Did not qualify (DNQ)
Red	Did not pre-qualify (DNPQ)
Black	Disqualified (DSQ)
White	Did not start (DNS)
White	Withdrew (WD)
White	Race cancelled (C)
Blank	Did not practice (DNP)
Blank	Did not arrive (DNA)
Blank	Excluded (EX)

**Bold** – Pole
Italics – Fastest Lap

=== Am Class ===
Pos.	Driver	ALC (Spain)	IMO (Italy)		RBR (Austria)	CPR (France)		SPA (Belgium)		EST (Portugal)	Pts.
Pos.	Driver	Am	En	Am	Am	En	Am	En	Am	Am	Pts.
1	(Germany) Fabian Schiller	**1**	1	1	**2**	Ret	5	**1**	**1**	**1**	178
2	(Spain) Fran Rueda	2	5	3	1	**1**	**2**	9	4	2	147
3	(Sweden) Fredrik Blomstedt	11	**2**	**2**	6	2	1	2	5	DSQ	115
4	(Portugal) Miguel Ramos	3	6	6	Ret	3	3	3	3	4	103
5	(Colombia) Andrés Méndez	7	3	5	3	7	7	Ret	7	Ret	64
6	(France) Christophe Hamon				8	4	4	4	6	6	56
7	(Netherlands) Jelle Beelen	5	Ret	7	Ret	9	DSQ	Ret	2	3	51
8	(Netherlands) Jeroen Schothorst	Ret	9	12	7	5	6	5	10	10	42
9	(Spain) Carmen Jordá	8	NC	9	9	Ret	8	8	Ret		28
10	(Spain) Toni Forné	Ret	4	4							24
11	(Netherlands) Max Braams	4			4						24
12	(Denmark) Dennis Andersen	10	8	10	5	11	9	Ret	11	9	24
13	(Italy) Davide Roda	Ret	Ret	13	13	Ret	11	11	12	5	16
14	(United Kingdom) Ash Hand	9	7	8							12
15	(United Kingdom) Tim Sugden	6									8
16	(Germany) Oliver Freymuth		11	11						7	6
17	(France) Gilles Duquein					8	12				4
18	(Italy) "Due"				10	12	10				2
19	(United Kingdom) Nick Leventis		10	Ret							1
20	(France) Jean-Marc Merlin				11						0
21	(United Kingdom) Ben Anderson				12						0
Guest drivers ineligible for points
	(Brazil) Adalberto Baptista							6	9	Ret	0
	(France) Philippe Haezebrouck							7	8	8	0
	(France) Philippe Bourgois							10	13		0
	(Netherlands) Diederik Sijthoff							Ret	DNS		0
	(France) Thierry Soave									Ret	0
Pos.	Driver	Am	En	Am	Am	En	Am	En	Am	Am	Pts.
Pos.	Driver	ALC (Spain)	IMO (Italy)		RBR (Austria)	CPR (France)		SPA (Belgium)		EST (Portugal)	Pts.

Colour	Result
Gold	Winner
Silver	Second place
Bronze	Third place
Green	Points classification
Blue	Non-points classification
Blue	Non-classified finish (NC)
Purple	Retired, not classified (Ret)
Red	Did not qualify (DNQ)
Red	Did not pre-qualify (DNPQ)
Black	Disqualified (DSQ)
White	Did not start (DNS)
White	Withdrew (WD)
White	Race cancelled (C)
Blank	Did not practice (DNP)
Blank	Did not arrive (DNA)
Blank	Excluded (EX)

**Bold** – Pole
Italics – Fastest Lap

=== Endurance Trophy ===
Pos.	Driver	ALC (Spain)	IMO (Italy)	RBR (Austria)	CPR (France)	SPA (Belgium)	EST (Portugal)	Pts.
1	(Germany) Fabian Schiller	1	3	1	Ret	9	2	87
1	(Finland) Markus Palttala	1	3	1		9	2	87
2	(Sweden) Frederik Blomstedt	2	**1**	4	9	1	Ret	82
3	(Portugal) Miguel Ramos	Ret	5	2	3	5	**1**	78
4	(Estonia) Kevin Korjus	2	**1**	4	Ret	4	Ret	67
5	(Spain) Fran Rueda (Thailand) Tanart Sathienthirakul	Ret	9	3	**1**	7	3	63
6	(Netherlands) Pieter Schothorst (Netherlands) Jeroen Schothorst	5	6	**8**	2	2	Ret	58
7	(United Kingdom) Raoul Owens	4	4	9	9	1	Ret	53
8	(France) Christophe Hamon			Ret	4	3	5	37
9	(Colombia) Andrés Méndez	Ret	2	Ret	8	Ret	6	30
10	(Netherlands) Roy Geerts	Ret	5	2				28
11	(Italy) David Fumanelli	6	8	10	7	Ret	6	27
12	(Spain) Toni Forné	4	4					24
13	(France) Lonni Martins			Ret	4	10	5	24
14	(Brazil) Bruno Bonifacio	Ret	2	Ret	8			22
15	(United Kingdom) Lewis Williamson	**3**	7					21
16	(Spain) Carmen Jordá	7	12	7	Ret	6		20
17	(South Africa) Jordan Grogor	7		7	Ret	6		20
18	(Netherlands) Nicky Pastorelli (Netherlands) Jelle Beelen	Ret	Ret	Ret	5	Ret	7	16
19	(Netherlands) Mike Verschuur				3			15
20	(United Kingdom) Tim Sugden	**3**						15
21	(United Kingdom) Josh Webster		12				4	12
21	(Germany) Oliver Freymuth		11				4	12
22	(United Kingdom) Ash Hand	6	8					12
23	(Denmark) Anders Fjordbach (Denmark) Dennis Andersen	Ret	10	Ret	6	Ret	9	11
24	(Netherlands) Max Braams	Ret		5				10
24	(Netherlands) Duncan Huisman			5				10
25	(Italy) Dario Capitanio (Italy) Davide Roda	Ret	Ret	6	Ret	Ret	Ret	8
26	(Italy) "Due"			10	7			1
27	(United Kingdom) Nick Leventis		7					6
28	(France) Nelson Panciatici				10		8	5
29	(France) Jean-Marc Merlin			9				2
30	(France) Gilles Duqueine				10			1
31	(Colombia) Diego Mejía (United Kingdom) Ben Anderson			11				0
32	(Netherlands) Meindert van Buuren	Ret	11			Ret		0
33	(Belgium) Renaud Kuppens				Ret			0
Guest drivers ineligible for points
	(Netherlands) Steijn Schothorst					5	**1**	0
	(Poland) Robert Kubica					3		0
	(France) Philippe Haezebrouck					4	Ret	0
	(Brazil) Adalberto Baptista					8	Ret	0
	(Brazil) Rodrigo Baptista					8	Ret	0
	(France) Thierry Soave						8	0
	(Portugal) Pedro Moleiro						Ret	0
	(Netherlands) Diederik Sijthoff					Ret		0
Pos.	Driver	ALC (Spain)	IMO (Italy)	RBR (Austria)	CPR (France)	SPA (Belgium)	EST (Portugal)	Pts.

Colour	Result
Gold	Winner
Silver	Second place
Bronze	Third place
Green	Points classification
Blue	Non-points classification
Blue	Non-classified finish (NC)
Purple	Retired, not classified (Ret)
Red	Did not qualify (DNQ)
Red	Did not pre-qualify (DNPQ)
Black	Disqualified (DSQ)
White	Did not start (DNS)
White	Withdrew (WD)
White	Race cancelled (C)
Blank	Did not practice (DNP)
Blank	Did not arrive (DNA)
Blank	Excluded (EX)

**Bold** – Pole
Italics – Fastest Lap

== Teams' Championship ==
Pos.	Team	No.	ALC (Spain)			IMO (Italy)			RBR (Austria)			CPR (France)			SPA (Belgium)			EST (Portugal)			Pts.
Pos.	Team	No.	En	Am	Pro	En	Am	Pro	En	Am	Pro	En	Am	Pro	En	Am	Pro	En	Am	Pro	Pts.
1	(Spain) Team Marc VDS EG 0,0	9	1	1	3	3	1	Ret	1	2	2	Ret	5	8	9	1	5	2	1	5	476
1	(Spain) Team Marc VDS EG 0,0	15	Ret	2	9	9	3	8	3	1	5	1	2	Ret	7	4	8	3	2	10	476
2	(Netherlands) Equipe Verschuur	19	Ret	3	4	5	6	Ret	2	Ret	Ret	3	3	Ret	5	3	2	1	4	1	366
2	(Netherlands) Equipe Verschuur	21	5	Ret	10	6	12	Ret	8	7	1	2	6	1	2	10	1	Ret	10	4	366
3	(France) R-ace GP	2	4	Ret	Ret	4	4	10	9	11	Ret	9	1	7	1	5	6	Ret	DSQ	9	312
3	(France) R-ace GP	3	2	11	1	1	2	3	4	6	6	Ret		Ret	4	8	3	Ret	8	2	312
4	(Italy) Oregon Team	4	Ret	7	11	2	5	1	Ret	3	DSQ	8	7	4	Ret	7	Ret	6	Ret	3	234
4	(Italy) Oregon Team	5	6	9	5	8	8	2	10	10	3	7	10	2	8	9	10	Ret	5	13	234
5	(Netherlands) V8 Racing	7	Ret	5	8	Ret	7	5	5	4	Ret	5	DSQ	10	Ret	2	Ret	7	3	12	170
5	(Netherlands) V8 Racing	8	Ret	4	7	11	11	7	Ret	Ret	Ret	Ret	8	9	6	Ret	4	4	7	7	170
6	(United Kingdom) Strakka Racing	42	3	6	2	7	Ret	DSQ													47
7	(Denmark) High Class Racing	11	Ret	10	12	10	10	9	Ret	5	Ret	6	9	11	Ret	11	Ret	9	9	11	37
Pos.	Team	No.	En	Am	Pro	En	Am	Pro	En	Am	Pro	En	Am	Pro	En	Am	Pro	En	Am	Pro	Pts.
Pos.	Team	No.	ALC (Spain)			IMO (Italy)			RBR (Austria)			CPR (France)			SPA (Belgium)			EST (Portugal)			Pts.

Colour	Result
Gold	Winner
Silver	Second place
Bronze	Third place
Green	Points classification
Blue	Non-points classification
Blue	Non-classified finish (NC)
Purple	Retired, not classified (Ret)
Red	Did not qualify (DNQ)
Red	Did not pre-qualify (DNPQ)
Black	Disqualified (DSQ)
White	Did not start (DNS)
White	Withdrew (WD)
White	Race cancelled (C)
Blank	Did not practice (DNP)
Blank	Did not arrive (DNA)
Blank	Excluded (EX)

**Bold** – Pole
Italics – Fastest Lap
