= Pieter Schothorst =

Dutch racing driver (born 1992)

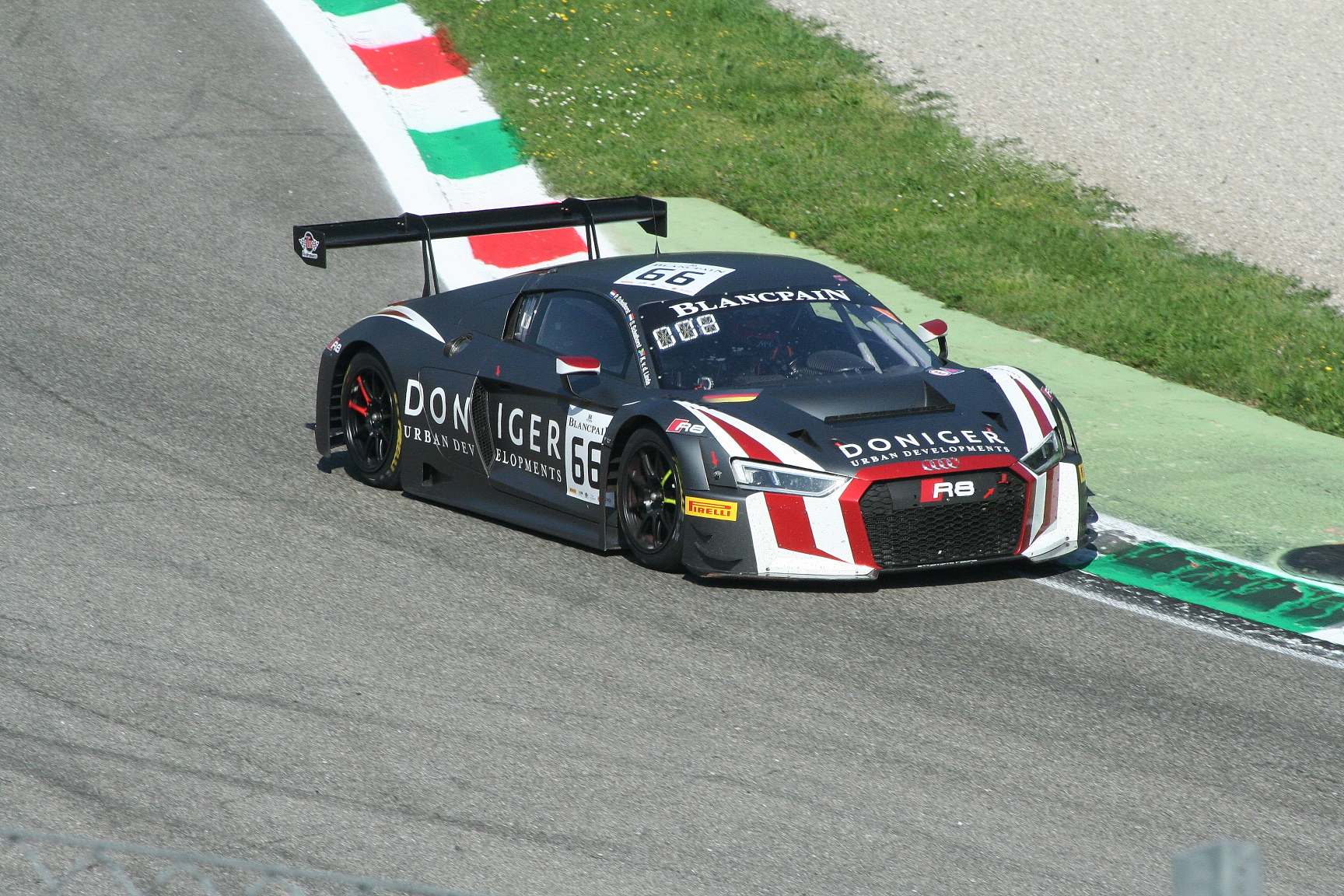
- Schothorst's Audi in 2018
- Nationality: (Netherlands) Dutch
- Born: 21 January 1992 (age 34) Blaricum, Netherlands
- Relatives: Jeroen Schothorst (father); Steijn Schothorst (brother); Freek Schothorst (brother); Bas Schothorst (cousin)
- Categorisation: FIA Silver

Championship titles
- 2016 2009: Renault Sport Trophy – Pro; Formido Swift Cup

Pieter Schothorst (born 21 January 1992) is a Dutch racing driver. He is the 2016 Renault Sport Trophy champion, and competed in GT World Challenge Europe for Team WRT and Attempto Racing between 2015 and 2022.

== Personal life ==
Schothorst is the son of Dutch businessman and former racing driver Jeroen Schothorst. His brothers Steijn and Freek are also racing drivers, as is his cousin Bas.

Schothorst dated YouTuber and presenter Iris Enthoven from 2012 to 2024, before breaking up with her while she was pregnant with his son Maup.

== Career ==
Schothorst began karting at the age of 8, before stepping up to cars in 2008 under the tutelage of Tom Coronel in the Dutch Winter Endurance Series. For the rest of 2008, Schothorst raced in the Formido Swift Cup, in which he took one win and four other podiums to end the year eighth overall. Staying in the series for 2009, Schothorst won six times en route to the series title. That year, Schothorst also made a guest appearance in the Eurocup Mégane Trophy for Equipe Verschuur.

Moving to single-seaters in 2010, Schothorst joined Geva Racing to compete in Formula Ford Benelux. He took four wins and seven other podiums to secure runner-up honours in the overall Duratec standings behind Rogier Jongejans. Moving up to Formula Renault 2.0 for 2011, Schothorst joined R-ace GP for the full Eurocup Formula Renault 2.0 season and select rounds of the Formula Renault 2.0 Northern European Cup. He placed 24th in the former with a single point, but managed a podium at Zandvoort in the latter. Moving to Josef Kaufmann Racing for 2012, Schothorst improved to 28th in Eurocup with two points, whilst scoring a best result of fourth in NEC at Assen.

After a one-off appearance in the Toyota Racing Series for M2 Competition at the start of 2013, Schothorst switched to sportscars by joining Team Bleekemolen to compete in Porsche Carrera Cup Germany. Spending two seasons in the series, Schothorst took a best result of fifth at Nürburgring in his rookie year, before scoring a surprise pole position at Oschersleben in 2024 for Attempto Racing. That year, Schothorst also drove for Attempto in Porsche Supercup, in which he placed 18th with multiple best results of 12th.

Moving up to GT3 competition for 2015, Schothorst was a late addition to Team WRT's #4 Audi R8 LMS ultra alongside Max Koebolt and Sacha Bottemanne in the Blancpain Endurance Series' Pro-Am Cup. He was 20th, but also made select starts in the Renault Sport Trophy for Equipe Verschuur and won overall at Silverstone. Continuing in Renault Sport Trophy for 2016, Schothorst took four wins to clinch the Pro title, as well as two Endurance podiums with father Jeroen to finish sixth in points. In parallel, Schothorst contested the final four rounds of International GT Open for BMW Team Teo Martín alongside Miguel Ramos, taking Pro-Am wins at the Red Bull Ring and Barcelona.

Returning to Team WRT for 2017, Schothorst entered the Blancpain GT Series Sprint Cup with Jake Dennis in an Audi R8 LMS. In his Pro Cup debut, Schothorst scored a double podium at the Hungaroring to end the year ninth overall. Schothorst also raced in select rounds of the Endurance Cup between WRT and McLaren-fielding Strakka Racing. After a dual campaign for Audi-affiliated Attempto Racing yielded best finishes of 6th at Monza in Endurance (with brother Steijn and Kelvin van der Linde) and Brands Hatch in Sprint (with Pierre Kaffer) in 2018, Schothorst stepped down to the Silver Cup for 2019. Partnering Steijn and Mattia Drudi, Schothorst scored a triplet of poles and a class podium at Silverstone to end the season sixth in points.

Three years later, in 2022, Schothorst reunited with Attempto to compete in the GT World Challenge Europe Sprint Cup with Audi factory driver Dennis Marschall. Back in the Pro Cup, Schothorst took a podium at Zandvoort and five other points finishes to place eighth overall.

== Racing record ==
=== Racing career summary ===
Season	Series	Team	Races	Wins	Poles	F/Laps	Podiums	Points	Position
2007–08	Dutch Winter Endurance Series		5	0	1	0	0	48	7th
2008	Formido Swift Cup		12	1	1	1	5	118	8th
2008	Dutch Touring Car Cup		2	0	0	0	0	6	5th
2009	Formido Swift Cup		12	6	3	4	11	219	**1st**
2009	Eurocup Mégane Trophy	Equipe Verschuur	4	0	0	0	0	0	NC†
2010	Formula Ford Benelux – Duratec	Geva Racing	15	4	2	4	11	158	**2nd**
2010	British Formula Ford Championship	Geva Racing	10	0	0	0	0	0	NC†
2010	Formula Ford Festival – Duratec		1	0	0	0	0	—N/a	12th
2011	Eurocup Formula Renault 2.0	R-ace GP	14	0	0	0	0	1	24th
2011	Formula Renault 2.0 Northern European Cup	R-ace GP	9	0	0	0	1	81	18th
2012	Formula Renault 2.0 Northern European Cup	Josef Kaufmann Racing	8	0	0	0	0	45	30th
2012	Eurocup Formula Renault 2.0	Josef Kaufmann Racing	14	0	0	0	0	2	28th
2013	Toyota Racing Series	M2 Competition	3	0	0	0	0	67	21st
2013	Porsche Carrera Cup Germany – A	Team Bleekemolen	16	0	0	0	0	79	12th
2013	Eurocup Mégane Trophy	Las Moras by Equipe Verschuur	2	0	0	0	1	18	13th
2014	Porsche Carrera Cup Germany – A	McGregor by Attempto	18	0	1	0	0	40.5	18th
2014	Porsche Supercup	McGregor powered by Attempto Racing	10	0	0	0	0	20	18th
2015	Blancpain Endurance Series – Pro-Am	Team WRT	5	0	0	0	0	14	20th
2015	Renault Sport Trophy – Elite	Equipe Verschuur	2	1	1	2	2	40	11th
2015	Renault Sport Trophy – Endurance	Equipe Verschuur	2	0	0	1	0	0	NC
2015	Porsche GT3 Cup Challenge Benelux – Pro		1	0	0	0	1	17	6th
2016	Renault Sport Trophy – Pro	Equipe Verschuur	9	4	3	4	5	456	**1st**
2016	Renault Sport Trophy – Endurance	Equipe Verschuur	6	0	1	3	2	58	6th
2016	International GT Open – Pro-Am	BMW Team Teo Martín	8	1	1	1	3	26	10th
2017	Blancpain GT Series Sprint Cup	Team WRT	10	0	0	0	2	27	9th
2017	Blancpain GT Series Endurance Cup	Audi Sport Team WRT	1	0	0	0	0	4	40th
2017	Blancpain GT Series Endurance Cup	Strakka Racing	1	0	0	0	0	4	40th
2017	Intercontinental GT Challenge	Strakka Racing	1	0	0	0	0	0	NC
2017	VLN Series – BMW M235i Cup	ADAC Team Weser-Ems e.V.	2	0	0	0	0	6	36th
2017	24 Hours of Nürburgring – SP3T	Hyundai N	1	0	0	0	0	—N/a	9th
2018	24H GT Series – A6-Pro	Attempto Racing	1	0	0	0	0	0	NC
2018	Blancpain GT Series Sprint Cup	Attempto Racing	10	0	0	0	0	6.5	21st
2018	Blancpain GT Series Endurance Cup	Attempto Racing	4	0	0	0	0	8	38th
2019	Blancpain GT Series Endurance Cup	Attempto Racing	5	0	0	0	0	2	33rd
2019	Blancpain GT Series Endurance Cup – Silver	Attempto Racing	5	0	0	0	1	46	6th
2022	GT World Challenge Europe Sprint Cup	Attempto Racing	10	0	0	0	1	30	8th

^{†} As Schothorst was a guest driver, he was ineligible to score points.

=== Complete Eurocup Formula Renault 2.0 results ===
(key) (Races in bold indicate pole position; races in italics indicate fastest lap)

Year	Entrant	1	2	3	4	5	6	7	8	9	10	11	12	13	14	DC	Points
2011	R-ace GP	ALC; 1 Ret	ALC; 2; 12	SPA; 1 Ret	SPA; 2; 24	NÜR; 1; 10	NÜR; 2; 14	HUN; 1; 16	HUN; 2; 17	SIL; 1 Ret	SIL; 2; 23	LEC; 1; 22	LEC; 2; 15	CAT; 1; 20	CAT; 2; 20	24th	1
2012	Josef Kaufmann Racing	ALC; 1 Ret	ALC; 2; 19	SPA; 1; 28	SPA; 2; 29	NÜR; 1 Ret	NÜR; 2; 12	MSC; 1; 17	MSC; 2; 20	HUN; 1; 9	HUN; 2; 21	LEC; 1; 21	LEC; 2 Ret	CAT; 1; 19	CAT; 2; 14	28th	2

=== Complete Formula Renault 2.0 Northern European Cup results ===
(key) (Races in bold indicate pole position) (Races in italics indicate fastest lap)

Year	Entrant	1	2	3	4	5	6	7	8	9	10	11	12	13	14	15	16	17	18	19	20	Pos	Points
2011	R-ace GP	HOC; 1 Ret	HOC; 2; 12	HOC; 3; 8	SPA; 1 Ret	SPA; 2; 24	NÜR; 1; 10	NÜR; 2; 10	ASS; 1	ASS; 2	ASS; 3	OSC; 1	OSC; 2	ZAN; 1; 10	ZAN; 2; 2	MST; 1	MST; 2	MST; 3	MNZ; 1	MNZ; 2	MNZ; 3	18th	91
2012	Josef Kaufmann Racing	HOC; 1 Ret	HOC; 2 Ret	HOC; 3 DNS	NÜR; 1; 5	NÜR; 2 Ret	OSC; 1	OSC; 2	OSC; 3	ASS; 1; 4	ASS; 2; 9	RBR; 1; 23	RBR; 2 Ret	MST; 1	MST; 2	MST; 3	ZAN; 1	ZAN; 2	ZAN; 3	SPA; 1	SPA; 2	30th	45

=== Complete Toyota Racing Series results ===
(key)

Year	Entrant	1	2	3	4	5	6	7	8	9	10	11	12	13	14	15	DC	Points
2013	M2 Competition	TER; 1	TER; 2	TER; 3	TIM; 1	TIM; 2	TIM; 3	TAU; 1	TAU; 2	TAU; 3	HMP; 1	HMP; 2	HMP; 3	MAN; 1; 5	MAN; 2 Ret	MAN; 3; 17	21st	67

=== Complete Porsche Supercup results ===
(key) (Races in bold indicate pole position) (Races in italics indicate fastest lap)

Year	Team	1	2	3	4	5	6	7	8	9	10	Pos.	Pts
2014	McGregor powered by Attempto Racing	CAT; Ret	MON; 22	RBR; 16	SIL; 12	HOC; Ret	HUN; 12	SPA; 12	MNZ; 15	COA; 15	COA; 14	18th	20

=== Complete GT World Challenge Europe results ===
==== GT World Challenge Europe Endurance Cup ====
Year	Team	Car	Class	1	2	3	4	5	6	7	Pos.	Pts
2015	Team WRT	Audi R8 LMS ultra	Pro-Am	MNZ; 36	SIL; 22	LEC; 19	SPA; 6H; 22	SPA; 12H; 44	SPA; 24H; Ret	NÜR; 27	20th	14
2017	Audi Sport Team WRT	Audi R8 LMS	Pro	MNZ	SIL	LEC; 8					NC	0
2017	Strakka Racing	McLaren 650S GT3	Pro				SPA; 6H; 58	SPA; 12H; 58	SPA; 24H; Ret	CAT	NC	0
2018	Attempto Racing	Audi R8 LMS	Pro	MNZ; 6	SIL; 19	LEC; Ret	SPA; 6H; 20	SPA; 12H; 18	SPA; 24H; 44	CAT; DNS	38th	8
2019	Attempto Racing	Audi R8 LMS Evo	Silver	MNZ; 24	**SIL**; 9	**LEC**; Ret	**SPA**; **6H**; 15	**SPA**; **12H**; 62	**SPA**; **24H**; Ret	CAT; 15	6th	46

==== GT World Challenge Europe Sprint Cup ====
(key) (Races in bold indicate pole position; races in italics indicate fastest lap)

Year	Team	Car	Class	1	2	3	4	5	6	7	8	9	10	Pos.	Points
2017	Team WRT	Audi R8 LMS	Pro	MIS; QR; 14	MIS; CR; 10	BRH; QR; 13	BRH; CR; 9	ZOL; QR; 24	ZOL; CR; 9	HUN; QR; 3	HUN; CR; 2	NÜR; QR; 12	NÜR; CR; 12	9th	27
2018	Attempto Racing	Audi R8 LMS	Pro	ZOL; 1 Ret	ZOL; 2; 14	BRH; 1; 6	BRH; 2; 12	MIS; 1 Ret	MIS; 2; 12	HUN; 1; 12	HUN; 2; 17	NÜR; 1; 8	NÜR; 2; 12	21st	6.5
2022	Attempto Racing	Audi R8 LMS Evo II	Pro	BRH; 1; 9	BRH; 2; 12	MAG; 1; 13	MAG; 2; 7	ZAN; 1; 6	ZAN; 2; 3	MIS; 1; 5	MIS; 2 Ret	VAL; 1; 5	VAL; 2; 11	8th	30

=== Complete International GT Open results ===
Year	Team	Car	Class	1	2	3	4	5	6	7	8	9	10	11	12	13	14	Pos.	Points
2016	BMW Team Teo Martín	BMW M6 GT3	Pro-Am	EST; 1	EST; 2	SPA; 1	SPA; 2	LEC; 1	LEC; 2	SIL; 1; 3	SIL; 2; 6	RBR; 1; 1	RBR; 2; 7	MNZ; 1; 6	MNZ; 2 Ret	CAT; 1; 6	CAT; 2; 2	10th	26
