= Renault Sport Trophy =

Former single-seater racing championship

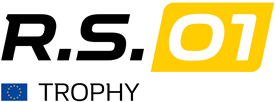
- Category: One-make racing by Renault
- Country: Europe
- Inaugural season: 2015
- Folded: 2016
- Constructors: Renault Sport
- Engine suppliers: Renault Sport
- Tyre suppliers: Michelin
- Last Drivers' champion: En: (Finland) Markus Palttala; En: (Germany) Fabian Schiller; Pro: (Netherlands) Pieter Schothorst; AM: (Germany) Fabian Schiller
- Last Teams' champion: (Spain) Team Marc VDS EG 0,0
- Official website: renault-sport.com

The Renault Sport Trophy was a one-make racing series created and managed by Renault Sport. The series has raced with the Renault Sport R.S. 01 in 2015 and 2016 as part of the Renault Sport Series (formerly World Series by Renault), but was folded after just two seasons.

== Development ==
In 2014, Renault announced its intention to create a new one-make sports car championship. The company unveiled the racecar for the series, called Renault Sport RS 01, at the 2014 Moscow Motor Show. The RS 01, developed by Renault Sport, has a Gibson Technology-tuned 3.8-litre V6 twin-turbo engine supplied by Renault Sport's Japanese partner Nismo and a chassis built by Dallara. It was announced that the championship would use a professional-gentleman driver combination. The first season was held in 2015. The second and the last season was held in 2016, as a support event for 2016 European Le Mans Series.

== Drivers and race format ==
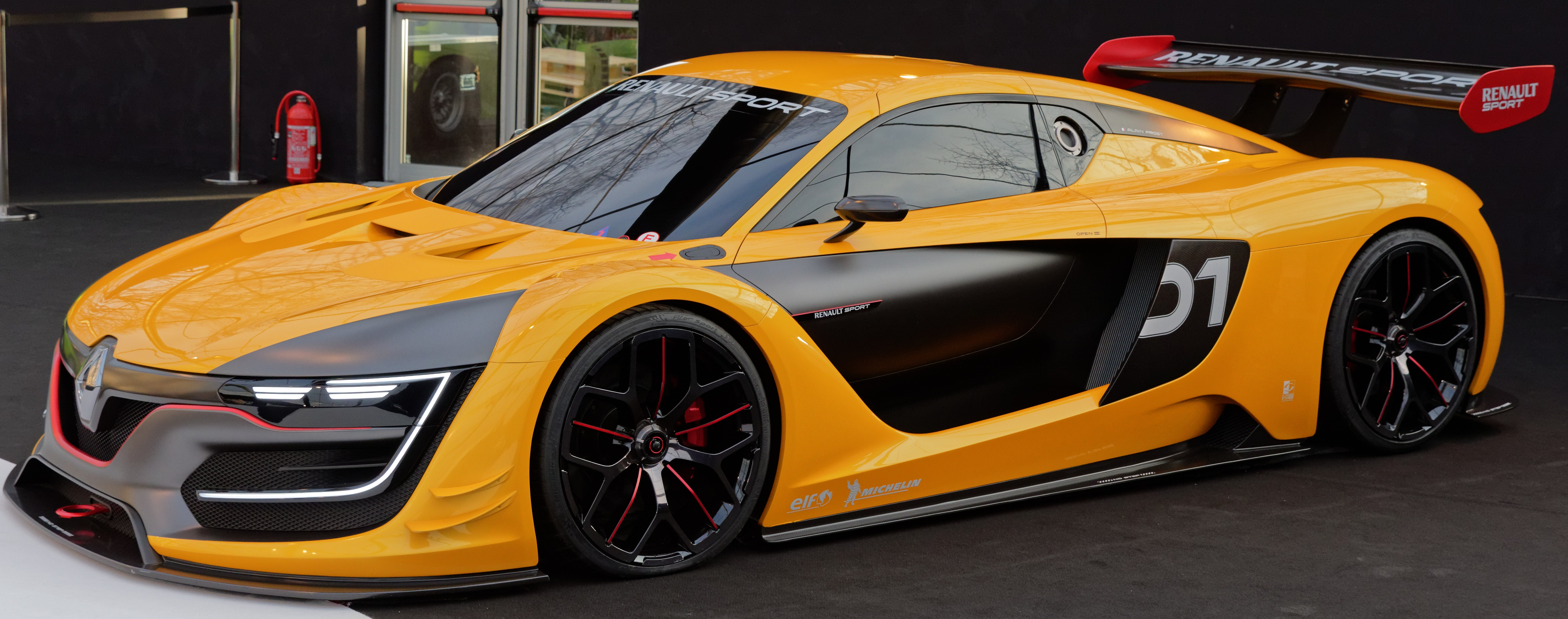
Renault Sport R.S. 01, the car used in the series

The car is driven by a professional-gentleman driver combination. Professional drivers compete for the Elite (or PRO) class championship and gentlemen for the Prestige (or AM) class. As of 2016, the race weekend consists of one 60-minute/90-minute (plus one lap) race called "endurance", where the two drivers of each car participate, and two 25-minute races (one for the Elite-class driver and other for the Prestige-class driver). There are separate qualifying sessions for Elite and Prestige to determine the grid order in the short races, and the endurance grid order is determined by a system that uses a mix of Elite and Prestige qualifying results.

== Awards ==
As of 2016 the Renault Sport Trophy Elite-class champion is given a development programme and the chance to participate at a Nismo's Super GT test. If he is not chosen to compete in Super GT, he receives a €200,000 award. The Prestige-class driver can opt between a €140,000 award to step up into the Elite class or a LMP2 entry at the Le Mans 24 Hours.

== Specifications ==
- Engine displacement: 3.8 L (232 cu in) DOHC V6
- Gearbox: 7-speed paddle shift gearbox (must have reverse)
- Weight: 2,524 lb (1,145 kg)
- Power output: 550 hp (410 kW)
- Fuel: Elf LMS 101.6 RON Unleaded
- Fuel Capacity: 39.6 US gallons (150 litres)
- Fuel Delivery: Fuel injection
- Aspiration: Twin-turbocharged
- Length: 4,710 mm (185 in)
- Width: 2,000 mm (79 in)
- Wheelbase: 2,744 mm (108 in)
- Steering: Hydraulic power-assisted rack and pinion

== Champions ==
Season	Endurance Champion	Elite/Pro Champion	Prestige/Am Champion	Team Champion
2015	(Italy) Dario Capitanio (Italy) David Fumanelli	(France) Andrea Pizzitola	(Italy) Dario Capitanio	(Italy) Oregon Team
2016	(Finland) Markus Palttala (Germany) Fabian Schiller	(Netherlands) Pieter Schothorst	(Germany) Fabian Schiller	(Spain) Team Marc VDS EG 0,0

== See also ==
- Eurocup Mégane Trophy
- Renault Clio Cup
