= 2019 Italian GT Championship =

Motor racing competition

The 2019 Italian GT Championship was the 28th season of the Italian GT Championship, a grand tourer-style sports car racing competition founded by the Italian Automobile Club (ACI). The championship consisted of four sprint race events and four endurance race events. Each sprint race event consisted of two races. The season started on 5 April in Monza and ended on 18 October at the same circuit.

== Teams and Drivers ==
=== GT3 ===
Team	Car	No.	Driver	Class	Rounds
(Italy) Easy Race	Ferrari 488 GT3	3	(Italy) Lorenzo Veglia	P	1–8
(Italy) Easy Race	Ferrari 488 GT3	3	(Italy) Marco Cioci	P	1, 3, 6–7
(Italy) Easy Race	Ferrari 488 GT3	3	(Italy) Daniel Mancinelli	P	1, 3
(Italy) Easy Race	Ferrari 488 GT3	3	(Italy) Lorenzo Casè	P	2, 4–5
(Italy) Easy Race	Ferrari 488 GT3	3	(Italy) Alessandro Balzan	P	6–7
(Italy) Easy Race	Ferrari 488 GT3	3	(Italy) Fabrizio Crestani	P	8
(San Marino) Audi Sport Italia	Audi R8 LMS	7	(Italy) Andrea Fontana	P	2, 4–5
(San Marino) Audi Sport Italia	Audi R8 LMS	7	(Germany) Pierre Kaffer	P	2, 5
(San Marino) Audi Sport Italia	Audi R8 LMS	7	(Belgium) Charles Weerts	P	3, 6
(San Marino) Audi Sport Italia	Audi R8 LMS	7	(France) Norman Nato	P	3
(San Marino) Audi Sport Italia	Audi R8 LMS	7	(Italy) Mattia Drudi	P	4
(San Marino) Audi Sport Italia	Audi R8 LMS	7	(Belgium) Mike Den Tandt	P	6
(San Marino) Audi Sport Italia	Audi R8 LMS	7	(Italy) Andrea Fontana	PA	8
(San Marino) Audi Sport Italia	Audi R8 LMS	7	(Italy) Andrea Dromedari	PA	8
(Italy) Antonelli Motorsport	Mercedes AMG GT3	8	(Italy) Nicola Baldan	P	2, 4–5, 8
(Italy) Antonelli Motorsport	Mercedes AMG GT3	21	(Italy) Andrea Palma	PA	1–4
(Italy) Antonelli Motorsport	Mercedes AMG GT3	21	(Italy) Francesca Linossi	PA	1, 3, 6–7
(Italy) Antonelli Motorsport	Mercedes AMG GT3	21	(Italy) Stefano Colombo	PA	1, 3, 6–7
(Italy) Antonelli Motorsport	Mercedes AMG GT3	21	(Italy) Andrea Larini	PA	2, 4–5
(Italy) Antonelli Motorsport	Mercedes AMG GT3	21	(China) Kang Ling	PA	6
(Italy) Antonelli Motorsport	Mercedes AMG GT3	21	(Italy) Daniel Zampieri	PA	7
(Italy) Antonelli Motorsport	Mercedes AMG GT3	22	(Russia) Alexander Moiseev	PA	1, 3, 6–7
(Italy) Antonelli Motorsport	Mercedes AMG GT3	22	(Italy) Alessio Rovera	PA	1, 3, 6–7
(Italy) Antonelli Motorsport	Mercedes AMG GT3	22	(Italy) Riccardo Agostini	PA	1, 3, 6–7
(Italy) Antonelli Motorsport	Mercedes AMG GT3	22	(Italy) Alessio Rovera	P	2, 4–5, 8
(Italy) Antonelli Motorsport	Mercedes AMG GT3	22	(Italy) Riccardo Agostini	P	2, 4–5, 8
(Germany) MRS GT Racing	BMW M6 GT3	14	(Germany) Marius Zug	PA	8
(Germany) MRS GT Racing	BMW M6 GT3	14	(Italy) Gabriele Piana	PA	8
(Italy) BMW Team Italia	BMW M6 GT3	15	(Italy) Stefano Comandini	P	1–8
(Italy) BMW Team Italia	BMW M6 GT3	15	(Sweden) Erik Johansson	P	1–8
(Italy) BMW Team Italia	BMW M6 GT3	15	(Finland) Jesse Krohn	P	1
(Italy) BMW Team Italia	BMW M6 GT3	15	(United Kingdom) Alexander Sims	P	3, 6
(Italy) BMW Team Italia	BMW M6 GT3	15	(Italy) Alessandro Zanardi	P	7
(Italy) Imperiale Racing	Lamborghini Huracán GT3 Evo	19	(Italy) Pietro Perolini	PA	1–8
(Italy) Imperiale Racing	Lamborghini Huracán GT3 Evo	19	(Australia) Ben Gersekwoski	PA	1–8
(Italy) Imperiale Racing	Lamborghini Huracán GT3 Evo	19	(United Kingdom) James Pull	PA	1
(Italy) Imperiale Racing	Lamborghini Huracán GT3 Evo	19	(San Marino) Emanuele Zonzini	PA	3, 6–7
(Italy) Imperiale Racing	Lamborghini Huracán GT3 Evo	63	(Italy) Vito Postiglione	P	1–8
(Italy) Imperiale Racing	Lamborghini Huracán GT3 Evo	63	(Netherlands) Jeroen Mul	P	1–8
(Italy) Imperiale Racing	Lamborghini Huracán GT3 Evo	63	(Italy) Alex Frassineti	P	1, 3, 6–7
(Italy) RS Racing	Ferrari 488 GT3	25	(Italy) Daniele Di Amato	PA	1–8
(Italy) RS Racing	Ferrari 488 GT3	25	(Italy) Alessandro Vezzoni	PA	1–8
(Italy) Scuderia Baldini 27	Ferrari 488 GT3	27	(Italy) Stefano Gai	P	1, 3, 6–7
(Italy) Scuderia Baldini 27	Ferrari 488 GT3	27	(Italy) Giancarlo Fisichella	P	1, 3, 6
(Italy) Scuderia Baldini 27	Ferrari 488 GT3	27	(Canada) Jacques Villeneuve	P	1, 3, 6
(Italy) Scuderia Baldini 27	Ferrari 488 GT3	27	(Italy) Antonio Fuoco	P	7
(Germany) Rinaldi Racing	Ferrari 488 GT3	33	(Russia) Rinat Salikhov	PA	6
(Germany) Rinaldi Racing	Ferrari 488 GT3	33	(Russia) Denis Bulatov	PA	6
(Germany) Rinaldi Racing	Ferrari 488 GT3	33	(South Africa) David Perel	PA	6
(Italy) AF Corse	Ferrari 488 GT3	51	(United States) Simon Mann	PA	1, 3–8
(Italy) AF Corse	Ferrari 488 GT3	51	(Italy) Matteo Cressoni	PA	1, 3–4, 6–8
(Italy) AF Corse	Ferrari 488 GT3	51	(Denmark) Nicklas Nielsen	PA	1, 3, 6
(Italy) AF Corse	Ferrari 488 GT3	51	(Italy) Marco Cioci	PA	5
(Italy) AF Corse	Ferrari 488 GT3	52	(Italy) Antonio Fuoco	PA	2, 4–5, 8
(Italy) AF Corse	Ferrari 488 GT3	52	(Singapore) Sean Hudspeth	PA	2, 4–5, 8
(Italy) AF Corse	Ferrari 488 GT3	71	(Japan) Ken Abe	Am	8
(Italy) AF Corse	Ferrari 488 GT3	71	(Italy) Christian Colombo	Am	8
(Italy) Vincenzo Sospiri Racing	Lamborghini Huracán GT3 Evo	66	(China) Kang Ling	PA	1, 3
(Italy) Vincenzo Sospiri Racing	Lamborghini Huracán GT3 Evo	66	(Finland) Tuomas Tujula	PA	1, 3
(Italy) Vincenzo Sospiri Racing	Lamborghini Huracán GT3 Evo	66	(Brazil) Felipe Ortiz	PA	1
(Italy) LP Racing	Lamborghini Huracán GT3 Evo	88	(Italy) Riccardo Cazzaniga	PA	1, 3, 6–7
(Italy) LP Racing	Lamborghini Huracán GT3 Evo	88	(Italy) Daniele Cazzaniga	PA	1, 3, 6–7
(Italy) LP Racing	Lamborghini Huracán GT3 Evo	88	(Italy) Luca Pirri	PA	1, 3, 6
(Italy) LP Racing	Lamborghini Huracán GT3 Evo	88	(China) Kang Ling	PA	7
(Italy) LP Racing	Lamborghini Huracán GT3 Evo	88	(Italy) Filippo Cuneo	Am	2, 4–5, 8
(Italy) LP Racing	Lamborghini Huracán GT3 Evo	88	(Italy) Niccolo Magnoni	Am	2, 4–5, 8

Icon	Class
P	Pro Cup
PA	Pro-Am Cup
Am	Am Cup

=== GT Light ===
Team	Car	No.	Driver	Rounds
(Italy) Antonelli Motorsport	Lamborghini Huracán Super Trofeo	102	(Italy) Mattia Michelotto	1, 3–8
(Italy) Antonelli Motorsport	Lamborghini Huracán Super Trofeo	102	(Italy) Gian Piero Cristoni	1, 3, 6–7
(Italy) Antonelli Motorsport	Lamborghini Huracán Super Trofeo	102	(Italy) Luca Demarchi	1
(Italy) Antonelli Motorsport	Lamborghini Huracán Super Trofeo	102	(Sweden) Emil Skaras	3, 6–7
(Italy) Duell Race	Porsche 991 GT3 Cup	123	(Italy) Francesco La Mazza	1–4
(Italy) Duell Race	Porsche 991 GT3 Cup	123	(Italy) Giuseppe Nicolosi	1–2, 4
(Italy) Duell Race	Porsche 991 GT3 Cup	123	(Italy) "Mark Speakerwas"	1, 3
(Italy) Duell Race	Porsche 991 GT3 Cup	123	(Italy) Gianluca Carboni	3
(Italy) Duell Race	Porsche 991 GT3 Cup	124	(Italy) Vincenzo Sauto	2
(Italy) Duell Race	Porsche 991 GT3 Cup	124	(Italy) Eugenio Pisani	2
(Italy) PMA Motorsport	Ferrari 458 GT3	132	(Italy) Maurizio Ceresoli	6
(Italy) PMA Motorsport	Ferrari 458 GT3	132	(Japan) Tanaka Satoshi	6
(Italy) Iron Lynx	Lamborghini Huracán Super Trofeo	134	(Italy) Federico Paolino	1–6, 8
(Italy) Iron Lynx	Lamborghini Huracán Super Trofeo	134	(Czech Republic) Jaromi Jirik	1–2, 4–5, 8
(Italy) Iron Lynx	Lamborghini Huracán Super Trofeo	134	(Italy) Lorenzo Bontempelli	1
(Italy) Iron Lynx	Lamborghini Huracán Super Trofeo	134	(Italy) Massimo Mantovani	3
(Italy) Iron Lynx	Lamborghini Huracán Super Trofeo	134	(Italy) Luca Demarchi	3, 6
(Italy) Iron Lynx	Lamborghini Huracán Super Trofeo	134	(United Kingdom) JM Littman	6
(Italy) Iron Lynx	Ferrari 458 GT3	134	(France) Deborah Mayer	7
(Italy) Iron Lynx	Ferrari 458 GT3	134	(Italy) Claudio Schiavoni	7
(Italy) Iron Lynx	Ferrari 458 GT3	134	(Italy) Sergio Pianezzola	7
(Italy) Iron Lynx	Ferrari 458 GT3	158	(Italy) Alberto Lippi	2, 4–5, 8
(Italy) Iron Lynx	Ferrari 458 GT3	158	(Italy) Giorgio Sernagiotto	2, 4–5, 8

=== GT Cup ===
Team	Car	No.	Driver	Rounds
(Italy) PB Racing	Lotus Exige V6 Cup R	186	(Italy) Stefano D'Aste	8
(Italy) PB Racing	Lotus Exige V6 Cup R	186	(Italy) Luciano Tarabini	8

=== GT4 ===
Team	Car	No.	Driver	Rounds
(Italy) Antonelli Motorsport	SIN R1 GT4	203	(Italy) Mattia Michelotto	2
(Italy) BMW Team Italia	BMW M4 GT4	207	(Italy) Giuseppe Fascicolo	1–8
(Italy) BMW Team Italia	BMW M4 GT4	207	(Italy) Francesco Guerra	1–8
(Italy) BMW Team Italia	BMW M4 GT4	207	(Italy) Andrea Fontana	1, 3, 6–7
(Italy) Nova Race	Ginetta G55 GT41–6; Mercedes AMG GT47–8	208	(Italy) Luca Magnoni	1–8
(Italy) Nova Race	Ginetta G55 GT41–6; Mercedes AMG GT47–8	208	(Norway) Aleksander Schjerpen	1, 3, 6–7
(Italy) Nova Race	Ginetta G55 GT41–6; Mercedes AMG GT47–8	208	(Italy) Enrico Garbelli	8
(Italy) Nova Race	Ginetta G55 GT41–6; Mercedes AMG GT47–8	209	(Italy) Alessandro Marchetti	2, 4–5, 8
(Italy) Nova Race	Ginetta G55 GT41–6; Mercedes AMG GT47–8	209	(Italy) Carlo Piero Mantori	2, 4–5, 8
(Italy) V-Action Racing Team	Maserati GranTurismo MC GT4	210	(Portugal) Jorge Rodrigues	1, 4, 7–8
(Italy) V-Action Racing Team	Maserati GranTurismo MC GT4	210	(Italy) Alberto Cerqui	1, 4
(Italy) V-Action Racing Team	Maserati GranTurismo MC GT4	210	(Finland) Juuso Matti Pajuranta	1, 7–8
(Italy) V-Action Racing Team	Maserati GranTurismo MC GT4	210	(Italy) Fabio Francia	7
(Italy) V-Action Racing Team	Maserati GranTurismo MC GT4	222	(Italy) Leonardo Becagli	1, 3–4, 6–7
(Italy) V-Action Racing Team	Maserati GranTurismo MC GT4	222	(Italy) Fabio Francia	1, 3
(Italy) V-Action Racing Team	Maserati GranTurismo MC GT4	222	(Italy) Adriano Bernazzani	1, 3, 6–7
(Italy) V-Action Racing Team	Maserati GranTurismo MC GT4	222	(Finland) Juuso Matti Pajuranta	6
(Italy) V-Action Racing Team	Maserati GranTurismo MC GT4	222	(Italy) Jacopo Baratto	7
(Austria) SVC Sport Management	Maserati GranTurismo MC GT4	250	(Poland) Piotr Chodzen	4–5, 7
(Austria) SVC Sport Management	Maserati GranTurismo MC GT4	250	(Poland) Antoni Chodzen	4–5, 7
(Austria) SVC Sport Management	Maserati GranTurismo MC GT4	250	(Italy) Patrick Zamparini	7
(Italy) Ebimotors	Porsche 718 Cayman GT4 Clubsport	251	(Italy) Simone Riccitelli	2, 4–5, 7–8
(Italy) Ebimotors	Porsche 718 Cayman GT4 Clubsport	251	(Italy) Sabino De Castro	2, 4–5, 8
(Italy) Ebimotors	Porsche 718 Cayman GT4 Clubsport	251	(Italy) Paolo Gnemmi	3, 6–7
(Italy) Ebimotors	Porsche 718 Cayman GT4 Clubsport	251	(Italy) Nicola Neri	3, 6–7
(Italy) Ebimotors	Porsche 718 Cayman GT4 Clubsport	251	(Italy) Riccardo Pera	3, 6
(Italy) Ebimotors	Porsche 718 Cayman GT4 Clubsport	252	(Italy) Gianluigi Piccioli	2, 4–5, 7–8
(Italy) Ebimotors	Porsche 718 Cayman GT4 Clubsport	252	(Italy) Francesco Costa	2, 4–5, 7
(Italy) Ebimotors	Porsche 718 Cayman GT4 Clubsport	252	(Italy) Daniel Mancinelli	7
(Italy) Ebimotors	Porsche 718 Cayman GT4 Clubsport	252	(Italy) Riccardo Pera	8
(Italy) Autorlando Sport	Porsche 718 Cayman GT4 Clubsport	275	(Italy) Dario Cerati	1–5, 7–8
(Italy) Autorlando Sport	Porsche 718 Cayman GT4 Clubsport	275	(Italy) Fondi Maurizio	1, 3, 7
(Italy) Autorlando Sport	Porsche 718 Cayman GT4 Clubsport	275	(Switzerland) Nicola Bravetti	1
(Italy) Autorlando Sport	Porsche 718 Cayman GT4 Clubsport	275	(Switzerland) Riccardo Chiesa	2, 4–5, 8
(Italy) Autorlando Sport	Porsche 718 Cayman GT4 Clubsport	275	(Italy) Paolo Ruberti	3
(Italy) Autorlando Sport	Porsche 718 Cayman GT4 Clubsport	275	(Italy) Luca Demarchi	7
(Italy) Autorlando Sport	Porsche 718 Cayman GT4 Clubsport	276	(Italy) Giuseppe Ghezzi	1–8
(Italy) Autorlando Sport	Porsche 718 Cayman GT4 Clubsport	276	(Switzerland) Riccardo Chiesa	1, 3, 6–7
(Italy) Autorlando Sport	Porsche 718 Cayman GT4 Clubsport	276	(Italy) Paolo Ruberti	1
(Italy) Autorlando Sport	Porsche 718 Cayman GT4 Clubsport	276	(Switzerland) Joël Camathias	2–5, 8
(Italy) Autorlando Sport	Porsche 718 Cayman GT4 Clubsport	276	(Italy) Fabio Babini	6–7
(Italy) Autorlando Sport	Porsche 718 Cayman GT4 Clubsport	277	(Italy) Dario Baruchelli	8
(Italy) Autorlando Sport	Porsche 718 Cayman GT4 Clubsport	277	(Switzerland) Nicola Bravetti	8
