= 2016 Blancpain GT Series Sprint Cup =

Car racing series

Seasons
- ← 2015 2017 →

The 2016 Blancpain GT Series Sprint Cup was the fourth season following on from the demise of the SRO Group's FIA GT1 World Championship (an auto racing series for grand tourer cars), the third with the designation of Blancpain Sprint Series or Blancpain GT Series Sprint Cup. After developing their partnership, Blancpain and the SRO decided that 2016 would see both the Sprint and Endurance Series further integrated into the Blancpain GT Series, putting the emphasis on the prestigious overall drivers' and manufacturers' titles causing the Sprint Series name to change from Blancpain Sprint Series to Blancpain GT Series Sprint Cup.

== Calendar ==
The series started at Misano World Circuit Marco Simoncelli on 10 April and ended at Circuit de Barcelona-Catalunya in Spain on 2 October. The calendar was reduced to five events, dropping races at Nogaro, Moscow, Algarve, Zolder and Zandvoort, with the addition of races at Hungaroring and Nürburgring.

Event	Circuit	Date	Report
1	Misano World Circuit Marco Simoncelli, Misano Adriatico, Italy	10 April	Report
2	(United Kingdom) Brands Hatch, Kent, Great Britain	8 May	Report
3	Nürburgring, Nürburg, Germany	3 July	Report
4	Hungaroring, Mogyoród, Hungary	28 August	Report
5	Circuit de Barcelona-Catalunya, Montmeló, Spain	2 October	Report

== Entry list ==
Team	Car	No.	Drivers	Class	Rounds
(Belgium) Belgian Audi Club Team WRT (Note: Only a limited number of cars per team were able to score points toward the Teams' championship. Therefore cars No. 2, 3 and 33 entered as Belgian Audi Club Team WRT, but in the Teams' championship the drivers of cars No. 2, 3 and 33 scored points for Team WRT.)	Audi R8 LMS	1	(Belgium) Laurens Vanthoor	P	All
(Belgium) Belgian Audi Club Team WRT	Audi R8 LMS	1	(Belgium) Frédéric Vervisch	P	All
(Belgium) Belgian Audi Club Team WRT	Audi R8 LMS	2	(United Kingdom) Stuart Leonard	S	All
(Belgium) Belgian Audi Club Team WRT	Audi R8 LMS	2	(United Kingdom) Michael Meadows	S	All
(Belgium) Belgian Audi Club Team WRT	Audi R8 LMS	3	(Brazil) Rodrigo Baptista	P	All
(Belgium) Belgian Audi Club Team WRT	Audi R8 LMS	3	(Portugal) Filipe Albuquerque	P	1
(Belgium) Belgian Audi Club Team WRT	Audi R8 LMS	3	(Brazil) Sérgio Jimenez	P	2–5
(Belgium) Belgian Audi Club Team WRT	Audi R8 LMS	4	(Belgium) Dries Vanthoor	P	All
(Belgium) Belgian Audi Club Team WRT	Audi R8 LMS	4	(Netherlands) Robin Frijns	P	1–2, 4
(Belgium) Belgian Audi Club Team WRT	Audi R8 LMS	4	(Switzerland) Nico Müller	P	3, 5
(Belgium) Belgian Audi Club Team WRT	Audi R8 LMS	28	(Germany) René Rast	P	1, 3–5
(Belgium) Belgian Audi Club Team WRT	Audi R8 LMS	28	(United Kingdom) Will Stevens	P	1, 3–5
(Belgium) Belgian Audi Club Team WRT	Audi R8 LMS	33	(Belgium) Enzo Ide	P	All
(Belgium) Belgian Audi Club Team WRT	Audi R8 LMS	33	(Germany) Christopher Mies	P	1–4
(Belgium) Belgian Audi Club Team WRT	Audi R8 LMS	33	(Netherlands) Robin Frijns	P	5
(Germany) Phoenix Racing	Audi R8 LMS	5	(Denmark) Nicolaj Møller Madsen	S	All
(Germany) Phoenix Racing	Audi R8 LMS	5	(Germany) Markus Pommer	S	1–3
(Germany) Phoenix Racing	Audi R8 LMS	5	(Belgium) Alessio Picariello	S	4–5
(Germany) Phoenix Racing	Audi R8 LMS	6	(Austria) Nikolaus Mayr-Melnhof	P	All
(Germany) Phoenix Racing	Audi R8 LMS	6	(Germany) Markus Winkelhock	P	All
(United Kingdom) Bentley Team M-Sport	Bentley Continental GT3	7	(Monaco) Vincent Abril	P	All
(United Kingdom) Bentley Team M-Sport	Bentley Continental GT3	7	(United Kingdom) Steven Kane	P	All
(United Kingdom) Bentley Team M-Sport	Bentley Continental GT3	8	(Spain) Andy Soucek	P	All
(United Kingdom) Bentley Team M-Sport	Bentley Continental GT3	8	(Belgium) Maxime Soulet	P	All
(Switzerland) Kessel Racing	Ferrari 488 GT3	11	(Poland) Michał Broniszewski	PA	All
(Switzerland) Kessel Racing	Ferrari 488 GT3	11	(Italy) Giacomo Piccini	PA	All
(Switzerland) Kessel Racing	Ferrari 488 GT3	111	(United States) Stephen Earle	Am	4
(Switzerland) Kessel Racing	Ferrari 488 GT3	111	(South Africa) David Perel	Am	4
(Belgium) Boutsen Ginion	BMW M6 GT3	12	(Finland) Matias Henkola	PA	1
(Belgium) Boutsen Ginion	BMW M6 GT3	12	(Belgium) Maxime Martin	PA	1
(Austria) GRT Grasser Racing Team	Lamborghini Huracán GT3	16	(Slovakia) Štefan Rosina	P	1–4
(Austria) GRT Grasser Racing Team	Lamborghini Huracán GT3	16	(Netherlands) Jeroen Bleekemolen	P	1–2
(Austria) GRT Grasser Racing Team	Lamborghini Huracán GT3	16	(Italy) Davide Valsecchi	P	3
(Austria) GRT Grasser Racing Team	Lamborghini Huracán GT3	16	(Italy) Marco Mapelli	P	4
(Austria) GRT Grasser Racing Team	Lamborghini Huracán GT3	19	(Italy) Michele Beretta	S	All
(Austria) GRT Grasser Racing Team	Lamborghini Huracán GT3	19	(Germany) Luca Stolz	S	All
(Austria) GRT Grasser Racing Team	Lamborghini Huracán GT3	63	(Italy) Mirko Bortolotti	P	All
(Austria) GRT Grasser Racing Team	Lamborghini Huracán GT3	63	(Germany) Nicolas Pohler	P	All
(United Kingdom) Nissan GT Academy Team RJN	Nissan GT-R Nismo GT3	22	(Mexico) Ricardo Sánchez	S	All
(United Kingdom) Nissan GT Academy Team RJN	Nissan GT-R Nismo GT3	22	(United Kingdom) Sean Walkinshaw	S	All
(United Kingdom) Nissan GT Academy Team RJN	Nissan GT-R Nismo GT3	23	(United Kingdom) Alex Buncombe	P	All
(United Kingdom) Nissan GT Academy Team RJN	Nissan GT-R Nismo GT3	23	(Japan) Mitsunori Takaboshi	P	1–3, 5
(United Kingdom) Nissan GT Academy Team RJN	Nissan GT-R Nismo GT3	23	(Spain) Lucas Ordóñez	P	4
(France) Saintéloc Racing	Audi R8 LMS	25	(France) Romain Monti	P	All
(France) Saintéloc Racing	Audi R8 LMS	25	(Sweden) Edward Sandström	P	All
(France) Saintéloc Racing	Audi R8 LMS	26	(France) Mike Parisy	P	All
(France) Saintéloc Racing	Audi R8 LMS	26	(Germany) Christopher Haase	P	1–4
(France) Saintéloc Racing	Audi R8 LMS	26	(Italy) Marco Bonanomi	P	5
(Germany) Team a-workx	Porsche 911 GT3 R	36	(Germany) Sebastian Asch	PA	1–3
(Germany) Team a-workx	Porsche 911 GT3 R	36	(Germany) Didi Gonzales	PA	1–3
(Italy) AF Corse	Ferrari 458 Italia GT3	55	(Germany) Claudio Sdanewitsch	Am	All
(Italy) AF Corse	Ferrari 458 Italia GT3	55	(Belgium) Stéphane Lémeret	Am	1–3, 5
(Italy) AF Corse	Ferrari 458 Italia GT3	55	(Italy) Rino Mastronardi	Am	4
(Italy) AF Corse	Ferrari 458 Italia GT3	90	(Italy) Raffaele Giammaria	P	1–3
(Italy) AF Corse	Ferrari 458 Italia GT3	90	(Argentina) Ezequiel Pérez Companc	P	1–3
(United Kingdom) Garage 59	McLaren 650S GT3	58	(United Kingdom) Rob Bell	P	All
(United Kingdom) Garage 59	McLaren 650S GT3	58	(Portugal) Álvaro Parente	P	All
(United Kingdom) Garage 59	McLaren 650S GT3	59	(United Kingdom) Martin Plowman	P	All
(United Kingdom) Garage 59	McLaren 650S GT3	59	(United Kingdom) Craig Dolby	P	1
(United Kingdom) Garage 59	McLaren 650S GT3	59	(France) Côme Ledogar	P	2–4
(United Kingdom) Garage 59	McLaren 650S GT3	59	(United Kingdom) Andrew Watson	P	5
(Germany) / Black Pearl Racing (Note: Car No. 66 entered as Black Pearl Racing and cars No. 333 and 458 entered as Rinaldi Racing.); (Germany) / Rinaldi Racing	Ferrari 458 Italia GT3	66	(Germany) Christian Hook	Am	1, 3–5
(Germany) / Black Pearl Racing; (Germany) / Rinaldi Racing	Ferrari 458 Italia GT3	66	(Germany) Steve Parrow	Am	1, 3–5
(Germany) / Black Pearl Racing; (Germany) / Rinaldi Racing	Ferrari 458 Italia GT3	66	(Germany) Steve Parrow	PA	2
(Germany) / Black Pearl Racing; (Germany) / Rinaldi Racing	Ferrari 458 Italia GT3	66	(Germany) Daniel Keilwitz	PA	2
(Germany) / Black Pearl Racing; (Germany) / Rinaldi Racing	Ferrari 488 GT3 (Note: Rinaldi Racing entered with a Ferrari 488 GT3, but drove at Misano with a Ferrari 458 Italia GT3 since the 488 had not arrived yet.)	333	(Germany) Marco Seefried	P	1–3
(Germany) / Black Pearl Racing; (Germany) / Rinaldi Racing	Ferrari 488 GT3	333	(Austria) Norbert Siedler	P	1–3
(Germany) / Black Pearl Racing; (Germany) / Rinaldi Racing	Ferrari 488 GT3	333	(Austria) Norbert Siedler	PA	5
(Germany) / Black Pearl Racing; (Germany) / Rinaldi Racing	Ferrari 488 GT3	333	(Russia) Rinat Salikhov	PA	5
(Germany) / Black Pearl Racing; (Germany) / Rinaldi Racing	Ferrari 458 Italia GT3	458	(Germany) Christopher Brück	PA	5
(Germany) / Black Pearl Racing; (Germany) / Rinaldi Racing	Ferrari 458 Italia GT3	458	(Germany) Alexander Mattschull	PA	5
(Czech Republic) ISR	Audi R8 LMS	74	(France) Franck Perera	P	All
(Czech Republic) ISR	Audi R8 LMS	74	(Philippines) Marlon Stöckinger	P	All
(Czech Republic) ISR	Audi R8 LMS	75	(Czech Republic) Filip Salaquarda	P	All
(Czech Republic) ISR	Audi R8 LMS	75	(Germany) Frank Stippler	P	All
(Germany) Attempto Racing	Lamborghini Huracán GT3	77	(Italy) Davide Valsecchi	P	1–2
(Germany) Attempto Racing	Lamborghini Huracán GT3	77	(United Kingdom) Jack Falla	P	1
(Germany) Attempto Racing	Lamborghini Huracán GT3	77	(Italy) Marco Mapelli	P	2
(Germany) Attempto Racing	Lamborghini Huracán GT3	100	(Netherlands) Jeroen Mul	S	1–4
(Germany) Attempto Racing	Lamborghini Huracán GT3	100	(Netherlands) Max van Splunteren	S	1–4
(Germany) Attempto Racing	Lamborghini Huracán GT3	100	(Netherlands) Max van Splunteren	P	5
(Germany) Attempto Racing	Lamborghini Huracán GT3	100	(Italy) Daniel Zampieri	P	5
(Germany) Attempto Racing	Lamborghini Huracán GT3	101	(Switzerland) Patric Niederhauser	P	1–4
(Germany) Attempto Racing	Lamborghini Huracán GT3	101	(Italy) Daniel Zampieri	P	1–4
(Germany) / AMG - Team HTP Motorsport (Note: Car No. 84 entered as HTP Motorsport from Round 1 to 3, but at Rounds 4 and 5 it entered as AMG - Team HTP Motorsport. Cars No. 85 and 86 entered as HTP Motorsport.); (Germany) / HTP Motorsport	Mercedes-AMG GT3	84	(Austria) Dominik Baumann	P	All
(Germany) / AMG - Team HTP Motorsport; (Germany) / HTP Motorsport	Mercedes-AMG GT3	84	(Germany) Maximilian Buhk	P	All
(Germany) / AMG - Team HTP Motorsport; (Germany) / HTP Motorsport	Mercedes-AMG GT3	85	(Malaysia) Jazeman Jaafar	P	All
(Germany) / AMG - Team HTP Motorsport; (Germany) / HTP Motorsport	Mercedes-AMG GT3	85	(Austria) Clemens Schmid	P	All
(Germany) / AMG - Team HTP Motorsport; (Germany) / HTP Motorsport	Mercedes-AMG GT3	86	(Germany) Bernd Schneider	P	All
(Germany) / AMG - Team HTP Motorsport; (Germany) / HTP Motorsport	Mercedes-AMG GT3	86	(Netherlands) Jules Szymkowiak	P	All
(France) AKKA ASP	Mercedes-AMG GT3	87	(France) Jean-Luc Beaubelique	PA	All
(France) AKKA ASP	Mercedes-AMG GT3	87	(France) Morgan Moullin-Traffort	PA	All
(France) AKKA ASP	Mercedes-AMG GT3	88	(Sweden) Felix Rosenqvist	P	All
(France) AKKA ASP	Mercedes-AMG GT3	88	(France) Tristan Vautier	P	All
(France) AKKA ASP	Mercedes-AMG GT3	89	(France) Jean-Philippe Belloc	PA	2–5
(France) AKKA ASP	Mercedes-AMG GT3	89	(France) Christophe Bourret	PA	2–5
(Germany) Rowe Racing	BMW M6 GT3	98	(Netherlands) Stef Dusseldorp	P	All
(Germany) Rowe Racing	BMW M6 GT3	98	(Netherlands) Nick Catsburg	P	1, 4–5
(Germany) Rowe Racing	BMW M6 GT3	98	(Finland) Jesse Krohn	P	2
(Germany) Rowe Racing	BMW M6 GT3	98	(Belgium) Maxime Martin	P	3
(Germany) Rowe Racing	BMW M6 GT3	99	(Austria) Philipp Eng	P	All
(Germany) Rowe Racing	BMW M6 GT3	99	(United Kingdom) Alexander Sims	P	All
(Switzerland) X-Bionic Racing Team	Lamborghini Huracán GT3	963	(Switzerland) Laurent Jenny	Am	1
(Switzerland) X-Bionic Racing Team	Lamborghini Huracán GT3	963	(Switzerland) Cédric Leimer	Am	1

Icon	Class
P	Pro Cup
PA	Pro-Am Cup
S	Silver Cup
Am	Am Cup

== Race results ==
Bold indicates overall winner.

Event	Circuit	Pole position	Qualifying Race Winners	Main Race			
Event	Circuit	Pole position	Qualifying Race Winners	Pro Winners	Pro-Am Winners	Silver Winners	Am Winners
1	(Italy) Misano	(Belgium) No. 1 Belgian Audi Club Team WRT	(United Kingdom) No. 8 Bentley Team M-Sport	**(Belgium) No. 1 Belgian Audi Club Team WRT**	(Switzerland) No. 11 Kessel Racing	(Germany) No. 5 Phoenix Racing	(Italy) No. 55 AF Corse
1	(Italy) Misano	(Belgium) Laurens Vanthoor (Belgium) Frédéric Vervisch	(Spain) Andy Soucek (Belgium) Maxime Soulet	**(Belgium) Laurens Vanthoor** **(Belgium) Frédéric Vervisch**	(Poland) Michał Broniszewski (Italy) Giacomo Piccini	(Denmark) Nicolaj Møller Madsen (Germany) Markus Pommer	(Belgium) Stéphane Lémeret (Germany) Claudio Sdanewitsch
2	(United Kingdom) Brands Hatch	(Czech Republic) No. 74 ISR	(Germany) No. 86 HTP Motorsport	**(Belgium) No. 33 Belgian Audi Club Team WRT**	(Switzerland) No. 11 Kessel Racing	(Austria) No. 19 GRT Grasser Racing Team	(Italy) No. 55 AF Corse
2	(United Kingdom) Brands Hatch	(France) Franck Perera (Philippines) Marlon Stöckinger	(Germany) Bernd Schneider (Netherlands) Jules Szymkowiak	**(Belgium) Enzo Ide** **(Germany) Christopher Mies**	(Poland) Michał Broniszewski (Italy) Giacomo Piccini	(Italy) Michele Beretta (Germany) Luca Stolz	(Belgium) Stéphane Lémeret (Germany) Claudio Sdanewitsch
3	(Germany) Nürburgring	(United Kingdom) No. 58 Garage 59	(Belgium) No. 33 Belgian Audi Club Team WRT	**(United Kingdom) No. 58 Garage 59**	(Switzerland) No. 11 Kessel Racing	(Austria) No. 19 GRT Grasser Racing Team	(Italy) No. 55 AF Corse
3	(Germany) Nürburgring	(United Kingdom) Rob Bell (Portugal) Álvaro Parente	(Belgium) Enzo Ide (Germany) Christopher Mies	**(United Kingdom) Rob Bell** **(Portugal) Álvaro Parente**	(Poland) Michał Broniszewski (Italy) Giacomo Piccini	(Italy) Michele Beretta (Germany) Luca Stolz	(Belgium) Stéphane Lémeret (Germany) Claudio Sdanewitsch
4	(Hungary) Hungaroring	(France) No. 88 AKKA ASP	(Belgium) No. 33 Belgian Audi Club Team WRT	**(Germany) No. 84 AMG - Team HTP Motorsport**	(France) No. 89 AKKA ASP	(Belgium) No. 2 Belgian Audi Club Team WRT	(Switzerland) No. 111 Kessel Racing
4	(Hungary) Hungaroring	(Sweden) Felix Rosenqvist (France) Tristan Vautier	(Belgium) Enzo Ide (Germany) Christopher Mies	**(Austria) Dominik Baumann** **(Germany) Maximilian Buhk**	(France) Jean-Philippe Belloc (France) Christophe Bourret	(United Kingdom) Stuart Leonard (United Kingdom) Michael Meadows	(United States) Stephen Earle (South Africa) David Perel
5	(Spain) Barcelona-Catalunya	(Czech Republic) No. 74 ISR	(Belgium) No. 33 Belgian Audi Club Team WRT	**(France) No. 88 AKKA ASP**	(Germany) No. 333 Rinaldi Racing	(Germany) No. 5 Phoenix Racing	(Italy) No. 55 AF Corse
5	(Spain) Barcelona-Catalunya	(France) Franck Perera (Philippines) Marlon Stöckinger	(Netherlands) Robin Frijns (Belgium) Enzo Ide	**(Sweden) Felix Rosenqvist** **(France) Tristan Vautier**	(Russia) Rinat Salikhov (Austria) Norbert Siedler	(Denmark) Nicolaj Møller Madsen (Belgium) Alessio Picariello	(Belgium) Stéphane Lémeret (Germany) Claudio Sdanewitsch

== Championship standings ==
Scoring system

Championship points were awarded for the first six positions in each Qualifying Race and for the first ten positions in each Main Race. The pole-sitter in the Qualifying Race also received one point and entries were required to complete 75% of the winning car's race distance in order to be classified and earn points. Individual drivers were required to participate for a minimum of 25 minutes in order to earn championship points in any race.

Qualifying Race points

Position	**1st**	**2nd**	**3rd**	**4th**	**5th**	**6th**	**Pole**
Points	8	6	4	3	2	1	1

Main Race points

Position	**1st**	**2nd**	**3rd**	**4th**	**5th**	**6th**	**7th**	**8th**	**9th**	**10th**
Points	25	18	15	12	10	8	6	4	2	1

=== Drivers' championships ===
==== Overall ====
Pos.	Driver	Team	MIS (Italy)		BRH (United Kingdom)		NÜR (Germany)		HUN (Hungary)		CAT (Spain)		Points
Pos.	Driver	Team	QR	MR	QR	MR	QR	MR	QR	MR	QR	MR	Points
1	(Belgium) Enzo Ide	(Belgium) Belgian Audi Club Team WRT	13	8	3	1	1	4	1	2	1	3	109
2	(Germany) Christopher Mies	(Belgium) Belgian Audi Club Team WRT	13	8	3	1	1	4	1	2			79
3	(Austria) Dominik Baumann (Germany) Maximilian Buhk	(Germany) HTP Motorsport	5	2	18	7	10	6					67
3	(Austria) Dominik Baumann (Germany) Maximilian Buhk	(Germany) AMG - Team HTP Motorsport							4	1	6	8	67
4	(Germany) Bernd Schneider (Netherlands) Jules Szymkowiak	(Germany) HTP Motorsport	Ret	7	1	2	8	3	5	5	10	31	59
5	(Belgium) Laurens Vanthoor (Belgium) Frédéric Vervisch	(Belgium) Belgian Audi Club Team WRT	**3**	1	5	15	24	7	3	8	13	4	58
6	(United Kingdom) Rob Bell (Portugal) Álvaro Parente	(United Kingdom) Garage 59	9	4	8	4	**2**	1	17	17	16	13	56
7	(Sweden) Felix Rosenqvist (France) Tristan Vautier	(France) AKKA ASP	7	32	9	9	27	10	**2**	4	3	1	51
8	(Spain) Andy Soucek (Belgium) Maxime Soulet	(United Kingdom) Bentley Team M-Sport	1	11	10	3	6	32	16	9	4	2	47
9	(Germany) René Rast (United Kingdom) Will Stevens	(Belgium) Belgian Audi Club Team WRT	14	Ret			3	2	10	3	5	18	39
10	(Netherlands) Robin Frijns	(Belgium) Belgian Audi Club Team WRT	4	22	6	12			11	7	1	3	33
11	(Austria) Philipp Eng (United Kingdom) Alexander Sims	(Germany) Rowe Racing	2	3	Ret	16	7	9	21	13	8	24	23
12	(France) Franck Perera (Philippines) Marlon Stöckinger	(Czech Republic) ISR	31	35	**2**	5	4	25	27	24	**26**	17	21
13	(Austria) Norbert Siedler	(Germany) Rinaldi Racing	6	6	14	Ret	11	5			23	22	19
14	(Germany) Marco Seefried	(Germany) Rinaldi Racing	6	6	14	Ret	11	5					19
15	(France) Mike Parisy	(France) Saintéloc Racing	11	Ret	11	6	31	17	6	6	Ret	DNS	17
16	(Germany) Christopher Haase	(France) Saintéloc Racing	11	Ret	11	6	31	17	6	6			17
17	(Italy) Mirko Bortolotti (Germany) Nicolas Pohler	(Austria) GRT Grasser Racing Team	Ret	12	7	24	Ret	Ret	8	14	2	5	16
18	(Belgium) Dries Vanthoor	(Belgium) Belgian Audi Club Team WRT	4	22	6	12	5	34	11	7	Ret	14	12
19	(Czech Republic) Filip Salaquarda (Germany) Frank Stippler	(Czech Republic) ISR	8	5	17	20	Ret	20	7	21	21	12	10
20	(Denmark) Nicolaj Møller Madsen	(Germany) Phoenix Racing	19	15	19	Ret	20	15	9	Ret	7	6	8
21	(Belgium) Alessio Picariello	(Germany) Phoenix Racing							9	Ret	7	6	8
22	(Italy) Michele Beretta (Germany) Luca Stolz	(Austria) GRT Grasser Racing Team	16	23	23	10	15	13	22	20	12	7	7
23	(Malaysia) Jazeman Jaafar (Austria) Clemens Schmid	(Germany) HTP Motorsport	DNS	19	4	19	14	23	19	12	20	9	5
24	(Monaco) Vincent Abril (United Kingdom) Steven Kane	(United Kingdom) Bentley Team M-Sport	20	17	12	8	23	Ret	14	10	WD	WD	5
25	(Netherlands) Stef Dusseldorp	(Germany) Rowe Racing	10	29	22	Ret	9	8	18	15	18	15	4
26	(Belgium) Maxime Martin	(Belgium) Boutsen Ginion	25	25									4
26	(Belgium) Maxime Martin	(Germany) Rowe Racing					9	8					4
27	(Switzerland) Nico Müller	(Belgium) Belgian Audi Club Team WRT					5	34			Ret	14	2
28	(Italy) Raffaele Giammaria (Argentina) Ezequiel Pérez Companc	(Italy) AF Corse	12	9	26	30	33	16					2
29	(France) Romain Monti (Sweden) Edward Sandström	(France) Saintéloc Racing	26	16	27	14	19	12	Ret	16	11	10	1
30	(Italy) Daniel Zampieri	(Germany) Attempto Racing	18	10	25	Ret	12	19	Ret	DNS	17	19	1
31	(Switzerland) Patric Niederhauser	(Germany) Attempto Racing	18	10	25	Ret	12	19	Ret	DNS			1
	(United Kingdom) Alex Buncombe	(United Kingdom) Nissan GT Academy Team RJN	17	14	21	18	16	14	20	18	9	11	0
	(Japan) Mitsunori Takaboshi	(United Kingdom) Nissan GT Academy Team RJN	17	14	21	18	16	14			9	11	0
	(Netherlands) Nick Catsburg	(Germany) Rowe Racing	10	29					18	15	18	15	0
	(United Kingdom) Stuart Leonard (United Kingdom) Michael Meadows	(Belgium) Belgian Audi Club Team WRT	Ret	18	15	Ret	28	18	12	11	14	20	0
	(Brazil) Rodrigo Baptista	(Belgium) Belgian Audi Club Team WRT	33	21	20	Ret	13	11	15	28	15	32	0
	(Brazil) Sérgio Jimenez	(Belgium) Belgian Audi Club Team WRT			20	Ret	13	11	15	28	15	32	0
	(Austria) Nikolaus Mayr-Melnhof (Germany) Markus Winkelhock	(Germany) Phoenix Racing	15	27	13	11	21	22	WD	WD	Ret	16	0
	(Slovakia) Štefan Rosina	(Austria) GRT Grasser Racing Team	Ret	Ret	16	17	17	24	13	Ret			0
	(Netherlands) Max van Splunteren	(Germany) Attempto Racing	21	20	24	13	22	21	24	Ret	17	19	0
	(Poland) Michał Broniszewski (Italy) Giacomo Piccini	(Switzerland) Kessel Racing	23	13	30	21	18	26	26	29	30	25	0
	(Netherlands) Jeroen Mul	(Germany) Attempto Racing	21	20	24	13	22	21	24	Ret			0
	(Italy) Marco Mapelli	(Germany) Attempto Racing			28	28							0
	(Italy) Marco Mapelli	(Austria) GRT Grasser Racing Team							13	Ret			0
	(Germany) Markus Pommer	(Germany) Phoenix Racing	19	15	19	Ret	20	15					0
	(Netherlands) Jeroen Bleekemolen	(Austria) GRT Grasser Racing Team	Ret	Ret	16	17							0
	(Italy) Davide Valsecchi	(Germany) Attempto Racing	22	DNS	28	28							0
	(Italy) Davide Valsecchi	(Austria) GRT Grasser Racing Team					17	24					0
	(Spain) Lucas Ordóñez	(United Kingdom) Nissan GT Academy Team RJN							20	18			0
	(United Kingdom) Martin Plowman	(United Kingdom) Garage 59	Ret	26	32	25	Ret	Ret	23	Ret	19	21	0
	(United Kingdom) Andrew Watson	(United Kingdom) Garage 59									19	21	0
	(Mexico) Ricardo Sánchez (United Kingdom) Sean Walkinshaw	(United Kingdom) Nissan GT Academy Team RJN	24	28	31	22	25	29	25	19	24	23	0
	(Portugal) Filipe Albuquerque	(Belgium) Belgian Audi Club Team WRT	33	21									0
	(France) Jean-Luc Beaubelique (France) Morgan Moullin-Traffort	(France) AKKA ASP	27	24	29	23	26	27	32	23	22	26	0
	(Russia) Rinat Salikhov	(Germany) Rinaldi Racing									23	22	0
	(France) Jean-Philippe Belloc (France) Christophe Bourret	(France) AKKA ASP			34	27	30	30	28	22	27	28	0
	(Finland) Jesse Krohn	(Germany) Rowe Racing			22	Ret							0
	(United Kingdom) Jack Falla	(Germany) Attempto Racing	22	DNS									0
	(France) Côme Ledogar	(United Kingdom) Garage 59			32	25	Ret	Ret	23	Ret			0
	(Finland) Matias Henkola	(Belgium) Boutsen Ginion	25	25									0
	(Germany) Christopher Brück (Germany) Alexander Mattschull	(Germany) Rinaldi Racing									25	27	0
	(United States) Stephen Earle (South Africa) David Perel	(Switzerland) Kessel Racing							31	25			0
	(Germany) Steve Parrow	(Germany) Black Pearl Racing	28	34	33	26	32	33	30	27	29	30	0
	(Germany) Claudio Sdanewitsch	(Italy) AF Corse	30	30	36	29	29	28	29	26	28	29	0
	(Italy) Rino Mastronardi	(Italy) AF Corse							29	26			0
	(Germany) Daniel Keilwitz	(Germany) Black Pearl Racing			33	26							0
	(United Kingdom) Craig Dolby	(United Kingdom) Garage 59	Ret	26									0
	(Germany) Christian Hook	(Germany) Black Pearl Racing	28	34			32	33	30	27	29	30	0
	(Belgium) Stéphane Lémeret	(Italy) AF Corse	30	30	36	29	29	28			28	29	0
	(Germany) Sebastian Asch (Germany) Didi Gonzales	(Germany) Team a-workx	29	31	35	31	EX	31					0
	(Switzerland) Laurent Jenny (Switzerland) Cédric Leimer	(Switzerland) X-Bionic Racing Team	32	33									0
	(Italy) Marco Bonanomi	(France) Saintéloc Racing									Ret	DNS	
Pos.	Driver	Team	QR	MR	QR	MR	QR	MR	QR	MR	QR	MR	Points
Pos.	Driver	Team	MIS (Italy)		BRH (United Kingdom)		NÜR (Germany)		HUN (Hungary)		CAT (Spain)		Points

Key
Colour	Result
Gold	Race winner
Silver	2nd place
Bronze	3rd place
Green	Points finish
Blue	Non-points finish
Blue	Non-classified finish (NC)
Purple	Did not finish (Ret)
Black	Disqualified (DSQ)
Black	Excluded (EX)
White	Did not start (DNS)
White	Race cancelled (C)
White	Withdrew (WD)
Blank	Did not participate

**Bold** – Pole
Italics – Fastest Lap

==== Pro-Am Cup ====
Pos.	Driver	Team	MIS (Italy)		BRH (United Kingdom)		NÜR (Germany)		HUN (Hungary)		CAT (Spain)		Points
Pos.	Driver	Team	QR	MR	QR	MR	QR	MR	QR	MR	QR	MR	Points
1	(Poland) Michał Broniszewski (Italy) Giacomo Piccini	(Switzerland) Kessel Racing	**23**	13	30	23	**18**	26	24	29	**30**	25	143
2	(France) Jean-Luc Beaubelique (France) Morgan Moullin-Traffort	(France) AKKA ASP	27	24	**29**	23	26	27	**32**	23	22	26	119
3	(France) Jean-Philippe Belloc (France) Christophe Bourret	(France) AKKA ASP			34	27	30	30	28	22	27	28	78
4	(Germany) Sebastian Asch (Germany) Didi Gonzales	(Germany) Team a-workx	29	31	35	31	EX	31					39
5	(Russia) Rinat Salikhov (Austria) Norbert Siedler	(Germany) Rinaldi Racing									23	22	31
6	(Finland) Matias Henkola (Belgium) Maxime Martin	(Belgium) Boutsen Ginion	25	25									21
7	(Germany) Daniel Keilwitz (Germany) Steve Parrow	(Germany) Black Pearl Racing			33	26							19
8	(Germany) Christopher Brück (Germany) Alexander Mattschull	(Germany) Rinaldi Racing									25	27	16
Pos.	Driver	Team	QR	MR	QR	MR	QR	MR	QR	MR	QR	MR	Points
Pos.	Driver	Team	MIS (Italy)		BRH (United Kingdom)		NÜR (Germany)		HUN (Hungary)		CAT (Spain)		Points

==== Silver Cup ====
Pos.	Driver	Team	MIS (Italy)		BRH (United Kingdom)		NÜR (Germany)		HUN (Hungary)		CAT (Spain)		Points
Pos.	Driver	Team	QR	MR	QR	MR	QR	MR	QR	MR	QR	MR	Points
1	(Italy) Michele Beretta (Germany) Luca Stolz	(Austria) GRT Grasser Racing Team	16	23	**23**	10	**15**	13	26	20	12	7	125
2	(Denmark) Nicolaj Møller Madsen	(Germany) Phoenix Racing	19	15	19	Ret	20	15	**9**	Ret	**7**	6	104
3	(United Kingdom) Stuart Leonard (United Kingdom) Michael Meadows	(Belgium) Belgian Audi Club Team WRT	**Ret**^{1}	18	15	Ret	28	18	12	11	14	20	96
4	(Mexico) Ricardo Sánchez (United Kingdom) Sean Walkinshaw	(United Kingdom) Nissan GT Academy Team RJN	24	28	31	22	25	29	23	19	24	23	79
5	(Germany) Markus Pommer	(Germany) Phoenix Racing	19	15	19	Ret	20	15					61
6	(Netherlands) Jeroen Mul (Netherlands) Max van Splunteren	(Germany) Attempto Racing	21	20	24	13	22	21	21	Ret			60
7	(Belgium) Alessio Picariello	(Germany) Phoenix Racing							**9**	Ret	**7**	6	43
Pos.	Driver	Team	QR	MR	QR	MR	QR	MR	QR	MR	QR	MR	Points
Pos.	Driver	Team	MIS (Italy)		BRH (United Kingdom)		NÜR (Germany)		HUN (Hungary)		CAT (Spain)		Points

Notes

- ^{1} – Stuart Leonard and Michael Meadows received points toward the Silver Cup championship, despite the fact that they were not classified.

==== Am Cup ====
Pos.	Driver	Team	MIS (Italy)		BRH (United Kingdom)		NÜR (Germany)		HUN (Hungary)		CAT (Spain)		Points
Pos.	Driver	Team	QR	MR	QR	MR	QR	MR	QR	MR	QR	MR	Points
1	(Germany) Claudio Sdanewitsch	(Italy) AF Corse	**30**	30	**36**	29	**29**	28	**29**	26	**28**	29	161
2	(Belgium) Stéphane Lémeret	(Italy) AF Corse	**30**	30	**36**	29	**29**	28			**28**	29	134
3	(Germany) Christian Hook (Germany) Steve Parrow	(Germany) Black Pearl Racing	28	34			32	33	30	27	29	30	92
4	(United States) Stephen Earle (South Africa) David Perel	(Switzerland) Kessel Racing							31	25			29
5	(Italy) Rino Mastronardi	(Italy) AF Corse							**29**	26			27
6	(Switzerland) Laurent Jenny (Switzerland) Cédric Leimer	(Switzerland) X-Bionic Racing Team	32	33									22
Pos.	Driver	Team	QR	MR	QR	MR	QR	MR	QR	MR	QR	MR	Points
Pos.	Driver	Team	MIS (Italy)		BRH (United Kingdom)		NÜR (Germany)		HUN (Hungary)		CAT (Spain)		Points

=== Teams' championships ===
==== Overall ====
Pos.	Team	Manufacturer	MIS (Italy)		BRH (United Kingdom)		NÜR (Germany)		HUN (Hungary)		CAT (Spain)		Points
Pos.	Team	Manufacturer	QR	MR	QR	MR	QR	MR	QR	MR	QR	MR	Points
1	(Belgium) Team WRT	Audi	13	8	3	1	1	4	1	2	1	3	104
2	(Germany) (AMG - Team) HTP Motorsport	Mercedes-Benz	5	2	1	2	8	3	4	1	6	8	97
3	(Belgium) Belgian Audi Club Team WRT	Audi	**3**	1	5	12	3	2	3	3	5	4	89
4	(France) AKKA ASP	Mercedes-Benz	7	24	9	9	26	10	**2**	4	3	1	61
5	(United Kingdom) Garage 59	McLaren	9	4	8	4	**2**	1	17	17	16	13	59
6	(United Kingdom) Bentley Team M-Sport	Bentley	1	11	10	3	6	32	14	9	4	2	55
7	(Germany) Rowe Racing	BMW	2	3	22	16	7	8	18	13	8	15	36
8	(Czech Republic) ISR	Audi	8	5	**2**	5	4	20	7	21	**21**	12	33
9	(Austria) GRT Grasser Racing Team	Lamborghini	16	12	7	10	15	13	8	14	2	5	28
10	(France) Saintéloc Racing	Audi	11	16	11	6	19	12	6	6	11	10	28
11	(Germany) Rinaldi Racing/Black Pearl Racing	Ferrari	6	6	14	26	11	5	30	27	23	22	20
12	(Germany) Phoenix Racing	Audi	15	15	13	11	20	15	9	Ret	7	6	10
13	(United Kingdom) Nissan GT Academy Team RJN	Nissan	17	14	21	18	16	14	20	18	9	11	4
14	(Italy) AF Corse	Ferrari	12	9	26	29	29	16	29	26	28	29	4
15	(Germany) Attempto Racing	Lamborghini	18	10	24	13	12	19	24	Ret	17	19	2
	(Switzerland) Kessel Racing	Ferrari	23	13	30	21	18	26	26	25	30	25	0
	(Belgium) Boutsen Ginion	BMW	25	25									0
	(Germany) Team a-workx	Porsche	29	31	35	31	EX	31					0
	(Switzerland) X-Bionic Racing Team	Lamborghini	32	33									0
Pos.	Team	Manufacturer	QR	MR	QR	MR	QR	MR	QR	MR	QR	MR	Points
Pos.	Team	Manufacturer	MIS (Italy)		BRH (United Kingdom)		NÜR (Germany)		HUN (Hungary)		CAT (Spain)		Points

==== Pro-Am Cup ====
Pos.	Team	Manufacturer	MIS (Italy)		BRH (United Kingdom)		NÜR (Germany)		HUN (Hungary)		CAT (Spain)		Points
Pos.	Team	Manufacturer	QR	MR	QR	MR	QR	MR	QR	MR	QR	MR	Points
1	(Switzerland) Kessel Racing	Ferrari	**23**	13	30	23	**18**	26	24	29	**30**	25	148
2	(France) AKKA ASP	Mercedes-Benz	27	24	**29**	23	26	27	**28**	22	22	26	128
3	(Germany) Rinaldi Racing/Black Pearl Racing	Ferrari			33	26					23	22	50
4	(Germany) Team a-workx	Porsche	29	31	35	31	EX	31					45
5	(Belgium) Boutsen Ginion	BMW	25	25									21
Pos.	Team	Manufacturer	QR	MR	QR	MR	QR	MR	QR	MR	QR	MR	Points
Pos.	Team	Manufacturer	MIS (Italy)		BRH (United Kingdom)		NÜR (Germany)		HUN (Hungary)		CAT (Spain)		Points

==== Am Cup ====
Pos.	Team	Manufacturer	MIS (Italy)		BRH (United Kingdom)		NÜR (Germany)		HUN (Hungary)		CAT (Spain)		Points
Pos.	Team	Manufacturer	QR	MR	QR	MR	QR	MR	QR	MR	QR	MR	Points
1	(Italy) AF Corse	Ferrari	**30**	30	**36**	29	**29**	28	**29**	26	**28**	29	161
2	(Germany) Black Pearl Racing	Ferrari	28	34			32	33	30	27	29	30	92
3	(Switzerland) Kessel Racing	Ferrari							31	25			29
4	(Switzerland) X-Bionic Racing Team	Lamborghini	32	33									22
Pos.	Team	Manufacturer	QR	MR	QR	MR	QR	MR	QR	MR	QR	MR	Points
Pos.	Team	Manufacturer	MIS (Italy)		BRH (United Kingdom)		NÜR (Germany)		HUN (Hungary)		CAT (Spain)		Points

== See also ==
- 2016 Blancpain GT Series
- 2016 Blancpain GT Series Endurance Cup
