= Jeroen Mul =

Dutch racing driver (born 1990)

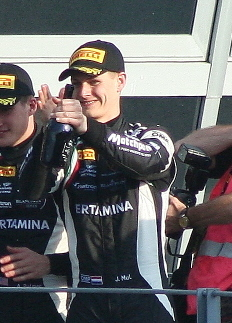
- Mul in 2015
- Nationality: (Netherlands) Dutch
- Born: 14 June 1990 (age 36) Amsterdam, Netherlands
- Categorisation: FIA Silver

Jeroen Mul (born 14 June 1990) is a Dutch racing driver who last competed for Change Racing in Lamborghini Super Trofeo North America. He notably won the 2015 Blancpain Endurance Series season opener at Monza on his GT3 debut.

== Career ==
Mul made his car racing debut in early 2007, by competing in the 2006–07 Dutch Winter Endurance Series. For the rest of the year, Mul raced in Formula Gloria Netherlands, in which he finished runner-up in points, as well as competing in select rounds of the Formula Ford Benelux series. Two seasons in Formula Ford Benelux then ensued, most notably finishing runner-up in the 2009 standings for Van Amersfoort Racing.

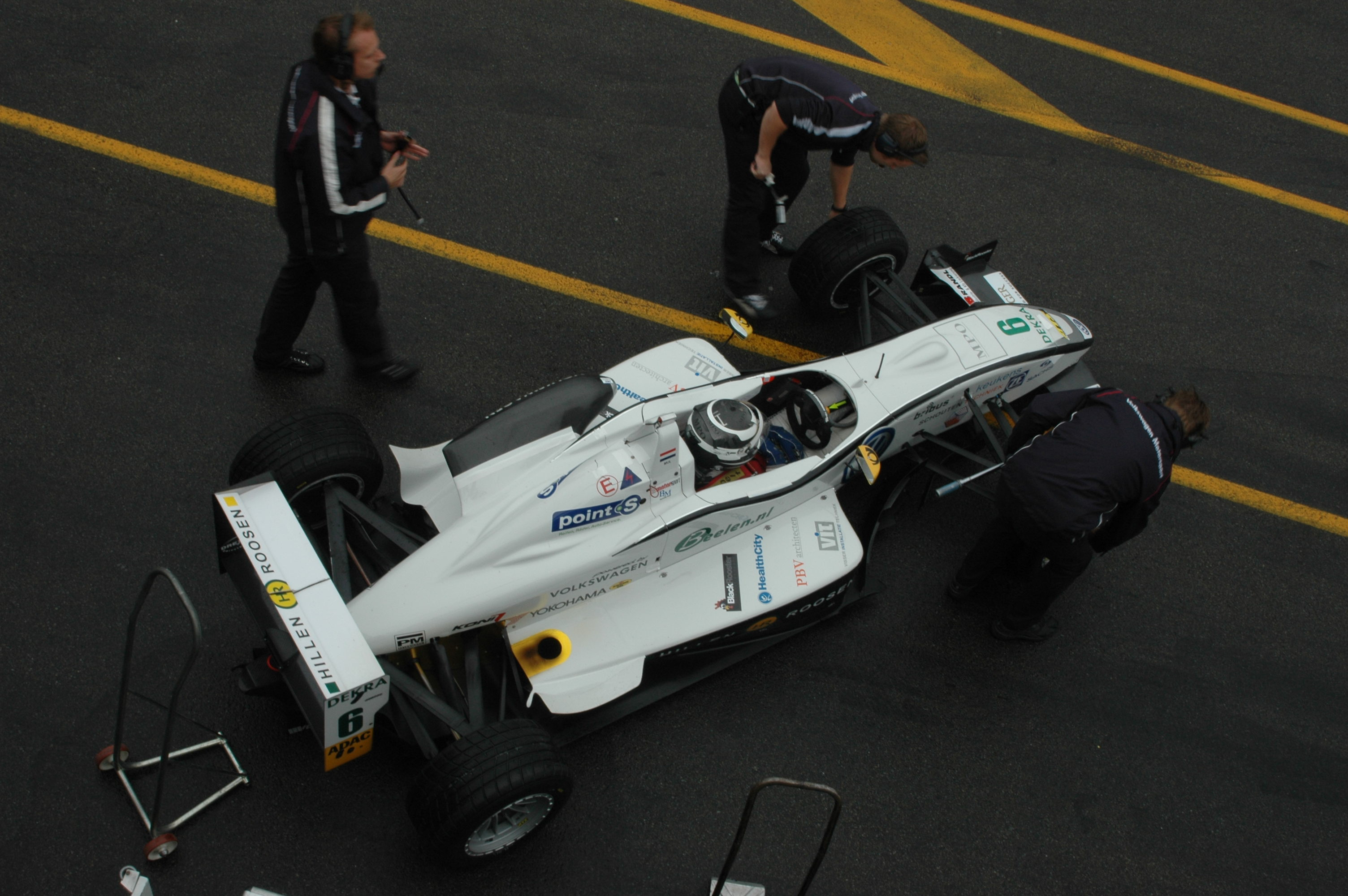
Mul sitting in his pit box at his home race of Assen in the 2011 German F3 season.

Remaining with the Dutch team for his step-up to the Formula Renault 2.0 Northern European Cup in 2010, Mul took wins at Zandvoort and Oschersleben, as well as four other podiums to secure third in points. The following year, Mul continued with VAR for his only season in the German Formula Three Championship, scoring best result of fifth twice to end the season tenth in the overall standings. Switching to sportscar racing for 2012, Mul joined Team Bleekemolen to race in Porsche Supercup, in which he scored a best result of fifth at Monza en route to a 12th-place points finish. Remaining with Team Bleekemolen for the 2013 season, Mul scored a best result of eighth in the season-opening Barcelona race as he rounded out the year 14th in points.

Starting 2014 with an A6-Am podium at the Dubai 24 Hour for rhino's Leipert Motorsport, Mul continued with the team for the rest of the year to race in Lamborghini Super Trofeo Europe as a member of the brand's Young Drivers Program. In his only season in the series, Mul scored five wins and four other podiums to secure runner-up honors in the Pro class. During 2014, Mul made a one-off appearance in Formula Acceleration 1 for Acceleration Team Portugal at Assen, taking a best result of sixth in race one.

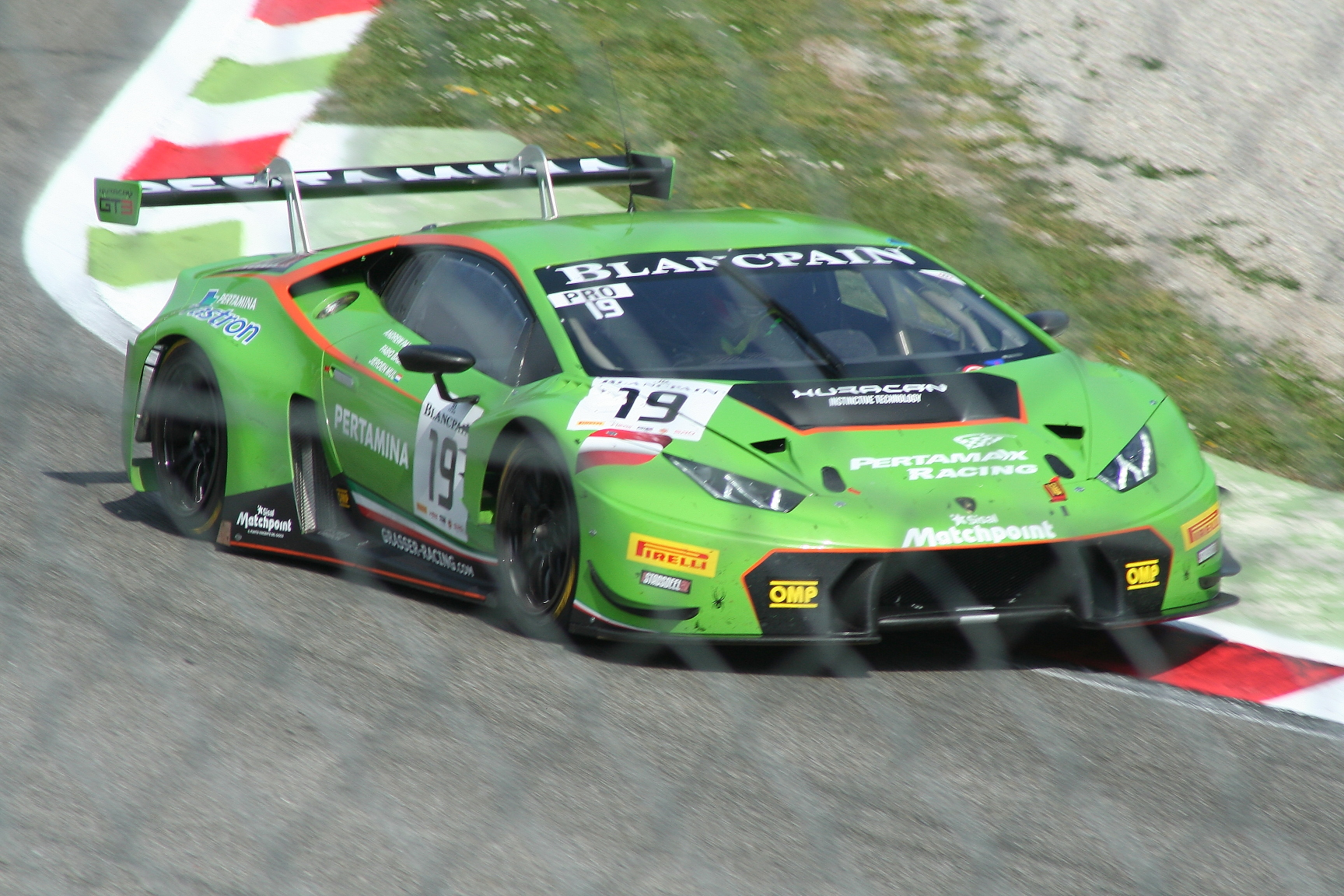
Mul took a shock win on his Blancpain Endurance Series debut at Monza in 2015.

Graduating to GT3 with Lamborghini for 2015, Mul joined Grasser Racing Team to race in the Blancpain Endurance Series. Partnering Fabio Babini and Andrew Palmer, the trio caused a stir by taking a dominant debut win for the Lamborghini Huracán at Monza, before being excluded on technical grounds, and later having the victory reinstated in August after appeal. However, they only managed a best result of 13th after that. During 2015, Mul also raced with the team in the Misano round of the Blancpain Sprint Series.

Switching to fellow Lamborghini-linked team Attempto Racing for 2016, Mul raced with them for a dual campaign in both the Blancpain GT Series Endurance and Sprint Cups. Between the two campaigns, Mul found more success in the latter, in which he scored five Silver Cup podiums, including a best class result of second at Brands Hatch as he ended the season sixth in points. In parallel, Mul raced in the Super GT3 class of the Italian GT Championship with Imperiale Racing, scoring three wins and four further podiums en route to a sixth-place points finish. During 2016, Mul also raced in the final two rounds of the GT Asia Series for FFF Racing Team by ACM, scoring a win at Shanghai.

Staying under Lamborghini's wing for 2017, Mul moved to Change Racing to compete in the GTD class of the IMSA SportsCar Championship. In his only season in the series, Mul scored a lone win at VIR to end the year 17th in points. During 2017, Mul also raced with the team in select rounds of Lamborghini Super Trofeo North America. Returning to Europe for 2018, Mul returned to Imperiale Racing for his first season in International GT Open, scoring a best result of second six times en route to a fourth-place points finish. Continuing with Imperiale for the following year, Mul raced with them in both the Endurance and Sprint Championships of the Italian GT Championship. In the former, Mul won at Misano to clinch third outright in points, whereas in the latter, he scored wins at Vallelunga and Imola to also finish third in the overall standings. After not racing in 2020, Mul made a brief return to racing in select rounds of Lamborghini Super Trofeo North America for Change Racing, finishing sixth in the Pro standings with five podiums to his name.

== Karting record ==
=== Karting career summary ===
Season	Series	Team	Position
2006	Chrono Rotax Max Winter Cup Senior — Olympic		2nd
2006	Chrono Dutch Rotax Max Challenge — Olympic		3rd

== Racing record ==
=== Racing career summary ===
Season	Series	Team	Races	Wins	Poles	F/Laps	Podiums	Points	Position
2006–07	Dutch Winter Endurance Series		5	0	0	0	1	54	4th
2007	Formula Gloria Netherlands							166	**2nd**
2007	Formula Ford 1800 Nederland		4				1	49	8th
2007	Formule Ford Zetec Benelux							37	7th
2008	Formula Ford Duratec Benelux	Stuart Racing	14	0	0	1	1	116	7th
2008	Formula Ford Festival – Duratec	Stuart Racing	1	0	0	0	0	—N/a	16th
2008	Formula Gloria Netherlands – B4		2	0	0	0	0	12	9th
2008–09	Dutch Winter Endurance Series		1	0	0	0	0	0	NC
2009	Formula Ford Duratec Benelux	Van Amersfoort Racing	14	0	1	1	6	148	**2nd**
2009	Formula Ford Denmark	Van Amersfoort Racing	2	0	0	0	2	0	NC
2009–10	Dutch Winter Endurance Series	MPO Match	1	0	0	0	0	0	157th
2010	Formula Renault 2.0 Northern European Cup	Van Amersfoort Racing	19	2	3	3	6	304	**3rd**
2011	German Formula Three Championship	Van Amersfoort Racing	18	0	0	0	0	18	10th
2012	Porsche Supercup	Team Bleekemolen	10	0	0	0	0	42	12th
2012	Porsche Carrera Cup Germany – Class A	Team Bleekemolen	4	0	0	0	0	0	NC†
2012–13	Dutch Winter Endurance Series	Sotrax Albert Motorsport	1	0	0	0	1	16	20th
2013	Porsche Supercup	Team Bleekemolen	9	0	0	0	0	27	14th
2013	Porsche Carrera Cup Germany – Class A	Team Bleekemolen	4	0	0	0	0	0	NC†
2014	Dubai 24 Hour – A6-Am	rhino's Leipert Motorsport	1	0	0	0	1	—N/a	**2nd**
2014	Lamborghini Super Trofeo Europe – Pro	rhino's Leipert Motorsport	12	5	1	1	9	141	**2nd**
2014	Lamborghini Super Trofeo World Finals – Pro	rhino's Leipert Motorsport	2	0	0	0	0	0	NC
2014	Formula Acceleration 1	Acceleration Team Portugal	2	0	0	0	0	6	21st
2015	Blancpain Endurance Series – Pro	Grasser Racing Team	5	1	1	1	1	28	13th
2015	Blancpain Sprint Series – Silver	Grasser Racing Team	1	0	1	1	1	7	8th
2016	Blancpain GT Series Endurance Cup	Attempto Racing	4	0	0	0	0	0	NC
2016	Blancpain GT Series Endurance Cup – Pro-Am	Attempto Racing	4	0	0	0	0	29	17th
2016	Blancpain GT Series Sprint Cup	Attempto Racing	8	0	0	0	0	0	NC
2016	Blancpain GT Series Sprint Cup – Silver	Attempto Racing	8	0	0	4	5	60	6th
2016	Italian GT Championship – Super GT3	Imperiale Racing	13	3	0	0	7	108	6th
2016	GT Asia Series – GT3	FFF Racing Team by ACM	4	1	1	0	1	0	NC†
2017	IMSA SportsCar Championship – GTD	Change Racing	12	1	2	0	1	237	17th
2017	Lamborghini Super Trofeo North America – Pro	Change Racing	3	0	1	1	2	24	9th
2017	Lamborghini Super Trofeo World Finals – Pro	Change Racing	2	0	0	0	0	0	NC
2018	International GT Open	Imperiale Racing	14	0	0	0	7	94	4th
2019	Italian GT Endurance Championship – GT3	Imperiale Racing	4	1	0	0	2	40	**3rd**
2019	Italian GT Sprint Championship – GT3	Imperiale Racing	8	2	0	0	4	83	**3rd**
2021	Lamborghini Super Trofeo North America – Pro	Change Racing	6	0	0	0	5	44	6th

^{†} As Mul was a guest driver, he was ineligible to score points.

=== Complete Formula Renault 2.0 NEC results ===
(key) (Races in bold indicate pole position) (Races in italics indicate fastest lap)

Year	Entrant	1	2	3	4	5	6	7	8	9	10	11	12	13	14	15	16	17	18	19	20	DC	Points
2010	Van Amersfoort Racing	HOC; 1; 3	HOC; 2 Ret	BRN; 1; 2	BRN; 2; 9	**ZAN**; **1**; 1	ZAN; 2; 8	OSC; 1; 8	**OSC**; **2**; 1	OSC; 3; 5	**ASS**; **1**; 3	ASS; 2; 7	MST; 1; 10	MST; 2; 2	MST; 3 Ret	SPA; 1; 4	SPA; 2; 7	SPA; 3; 17	NÜR; 1; 4	NÜR; 2; 6	NÜR; 3 C	3rd	304

=== Complete German Formula Three Championship results ===
(key) (Races in bold indicate pole position) (Races in italics indicate fastest lap)

Year	Entrant	Chassis	Engine	1	2	3	4	5	6	7	8	9	10	11	12	13	14	15	16	17	18	DC	Points
2011	Van Amersfoort Racing	Dallara F305	Volkswagen	OSC; 1; 11	OSC; 2 Ret	SPA; 1; 17	SPA; 2; 7	SAC; 1; 7	SAC; 2 Ret	ASS; 1; 8	ASS; 2; 8	ZOL; 1; 10	ZOL; 2; 8	RBR; 1 Ret	RBR; 2; 12	LAU; 1; 5	LAU; 2; 6	ASS; 1; 5	ASS; 2 Ret	HOC; 1; 10	HOC; 2; 10	10th	18

=== Complete Porsche Supercup results ===
(key) (Races in bold indicate pole position) (Races in italics indicate fastest lap)

Year	Team	1	2	3	4	5	6	7	8	9	10	Pos.	Pts
2012	Team Bleekemolen	BHR; 12	BHR; Ret	MON; 11	VAL; 17	SIL; 10	HOC; 19	HUN; Ret	HUN; 8	SPA; Ret	MNZ; 5	12th	42
2013	Team Bleekemolen	CAT; 8	MON; 24	SIL; 15	NÜR; Ret	HUN; 13	SPA; 10	MNZ; 13	YMC; 11	YMC; Ret		14th	27

=== Complete Formula Acceleration 1 results ===
(key) (Races in bold indicate pole position) (Races in italics indicate fastest lap)

Year	Team	1	2	3	4	5	6	7	8	9	10	Pos.	Points
2014	Portugal	ALG; 1	ALG; 2	NAV; 1	NAV; 2	NÜR; 1	NÜR; 2	MNZ; 1	MNZ; 2	ASS; 1; 6	ASS; 2; 13	21st	6

=== Complete GT World Challenge Europe results ===
==== GT World Challenge Europe Endurance Cup ====
Year	Team	Car	Class	1	2	3	4	5	6	7	Pos.	Points
2015	Grasser Racing Team	Lamborghini Huracán GT3	Pro	**MNZ**; 1	SIL; 17	LEC; Ret	SPA; 6H; 7	SPA; 12H; 46	SPA; 24H; Ret	NÜR; 13	13th	28
2016	Attempto Racing	Lamborghini Huracán GT3	Pro-Am	MNZ; 23	SIL; 44	LEC; 16	SPA; 6H; 15	SPA; 12H; 26	SPA; 24H; 52	NÜR; WD	17th	29

==== GT World Challenge Europe Sprint Cup ====
Year	Team	Car	Class	1	2	3	4	5	6	7	8	9	10	11	12	13	14	Pos.	Points
2015	Grasser Racing Team	Lamborghini Huracán GT3	Silver	NOG; QR	NOG; CR	BRH; QR	BRH; CR	ZOL; QR	ZOL; CR	MSC; QR	MSC; CR	ALG; QR	ALG; CR	**MIS**; **QR**; 16	MIS; CR; DNS	ZAN; QR	ZAN; CR	8th	7
2016	Attempto Racing	Lamborghini Huracán GT3	Silver	MIS; QR; 21	MIS; CR; 20	BRH; QR; 24	BRH; CR; 13	NÜR; QR; 22	NÜR; CR; 21	HUN; QR; 21	HUN; CR; Ret	CAT; QR	CAT; CR					6th	60

=== Complete IMSA SportsCar Championship results ===
(key) (Races in bold indicate pole position)

Year	Team	Class	Make	Engine	1	2	3	4	5	6	7	8	9	10	11	12	Rank	Points
2017	Change Racing	GTD	Lamborghini Huracán GT3	Lamborghini 5.2L V10	DAY; 25	SEB; 11	LBH; 8	COA; 17	DET; 11	WGL; 17	MOS; 6	LIM; 11	**ELK**; 13	**VIR**; 1	LGA; 9	PET; 11	17th	237

=== Complete International GT Open results ===
Year	Team	Car	Class	1	2	3	4	5	6	7	8	9	10	11	12	13	14	Pos.	Points
2018	Imperiale Racing	Lamborghini Huracán GT3	Pro	EST; 1; 2	EST; 2; 2	LEC; 1; 23	LEC; 2; 19	SPA; 1; 2	SPA; 2; 5	HUN; 1 Ret	HUN; 2; 5	SIL; 1; 2	SIL; 2; 2	MNZ; 1 Ret	MNZ; 2; 3	CAT; 1; 2	CAT; 2; 17	4th	94
