= Andrew Palmer (racing driver) =

American racing driver

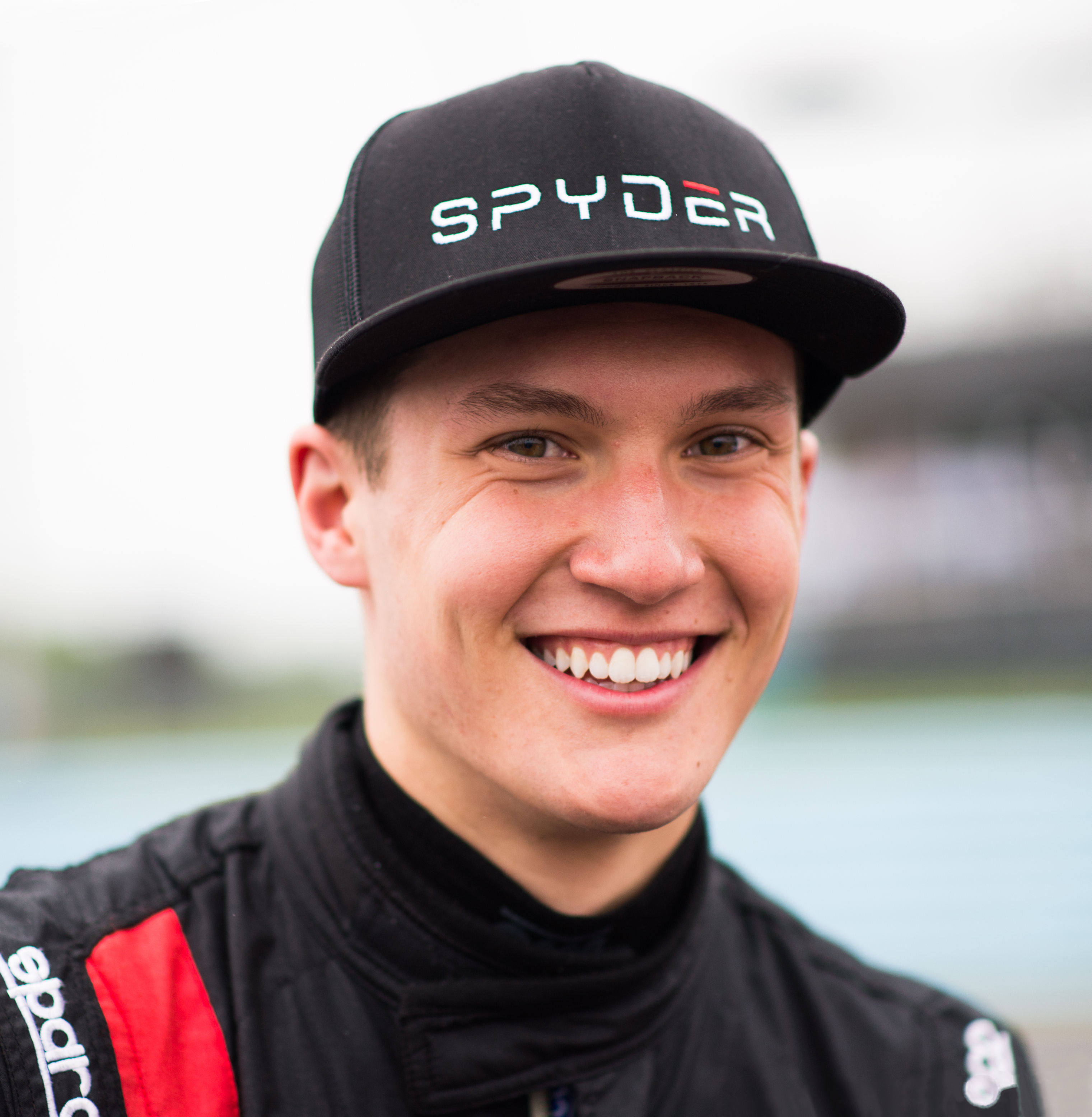
- Palmer at Watkins Glen 2015
- Nationality: (United States) American
- Born: July 10, 1994 (age 32) Chicago, Illinois, U.S.

Pirelli World Challenge WeatherTech SportsCar Championship career
- Debut season: 2013
- Current team: Bentley Team Absolute
- Categorisation: FIA Silver
- Former teams: GMG Racing; Grasser Racing; Flying Lizard Motorsports; PR1 Motorsports
- Starts: 34
- Championships: 2013 Lamborghini Super Trofeo World Championship; 2015 WeatherTech SportsCar Championship NAEC
- Wins: 10
- Poles: 4

Andrew Palmer (born July 10, 1994) is an American racing driver from Chicago, Illinois. He is a former official Lamborghini GT3 Junior driver and is currently contracted to Bentley Team Absolute. He is most known for winning the inaugural Lamborghini World Championship in 2013. He is also the youngest ever winner in the Pirelli World-Challenge, class winner of the 2015 24 Hours of Daytona, 2015 12 Hours of Sebring, and 2015 Petit Le Mans. With Lamborghini, he recorded their first ever overall win as a manufacturer at Monza in 2015.

== Early life and education ==
Palmer was born on July 10, 1994, in Chicago, US. He started his career in motorsports at the age of ten, racing at Chicago Indoor Racing before joining the outdoor team. He is the oldest of three children. He graduated from Pomona College in 2015 with a degree in Mathematical Economics. He currently resides in Los Angeles.

== Racing career ==
=== Karting ===
Palmer began karting at the age of ten in 2004. He quickly began to win national races before securing his first Rotax National Championship in 2010. He went on to be a Team USA member three times (2010, 2012, 2013) competing at the Rotax World Finals with a best finish of 13th. He also secured a World Karting Association National title in 2012.

=== Lamborghini Super Trofeo ===
In 2013, Palmer was given the opportunity with GMG Racing to compete in the final rounds of the Lamborghini Super Trofeo Championship in North America. He qualified on pole and won in his inaugural weekend at Virginia International Raceway. A few months later, Palmer was invited to the Lamborghini Super Trofeo World Championships in Rome, Italy. After winning the event at the age of 19, he was crowned the first ever Lamborghini Super Trofeo World Champion.

=== Sports Cars ===
In 2014, Palmer signed with Audi Sport Customer Racing team GMG Racing to compete in the Pirelli World Challenge. He became the youngest overall race winner in only his fourth start. He eventually finished fifth in the driver standings.

Also in 2014, Palmer filled in for an injured Seth Neiman and drove for Flying Lizard Motorsports in the WeatherTech SportsCar Championship Road America round. Later in the year, he returned to the team to compete in Petit Le Mans with co-drivers Spencer Pumpelly and Nelson Canache.

Throughout 2014, Palmer was one of the lead drivers involved in the development of the Lamborghini Huracan GT3 car. His involvement was a result of being part of the Lamborghini Young Driver program. In January 2015, he was offered an official contract from Lamborghini to drive one of the factory cars in the 2015 Blancpain Endurance Series.

In addition to driving for the factory supported Lamborghini program in Europe, Palmer also competed in the endurance races in the WeatherTech SportsCar Championship for PR1 Motorsport alongside Tom Kimber-Smith and Mike Guasch where they had an almost perfect season winning their class in the 2015 24 Hours of Daytona, 2015 12 Hours of Sebring, and 2015 Petit Le Mans.

Palmer was contracted to Bentley to drive in the 2016 Pirelli World Challenge season driving the Bentley Continental GT3, finishing in the top ten on many occasions. In May of that year, Palmer was injured in a major accident during warm up in the Pirelli World Challenge at Lime Rock Park, suffering a head injury. It is not known when he will return to racing.

== Racing record ==
=== US Endurance results ===
Year	Race	Team	Co-Drivers	Car	Class	Pos.	Class Pos.
2015	Daytona 24 Hours	(United States) PR1 Motorsports	(United Kingdom) Tom Kimber-Smith (United States) Mike Guasch (United States) Andrew Novich	Oreca FLM09	LMPC	8th	1st
2015	Sebring 12 Hours	(United States) PR1 Motorsports	(United Kingdom) Tom Kimber-Smith (United States) Mike Guasch	Oreca FLM09	LMPC	6th	1st
2015	Six Hours of The Glen	(United States) PR1 Motorsports	(United Kingdom) Tom Kimber-Smith (United States) Mike Guasch	Oreca FLM09	LMPC	5th	2nd
2015	Petit Le Mans	(United States) PR1 Motorsports	(United Kingdom) Tom Kimber-Smith (United States) Mike Guasch	Oreca FLM09	LMPC	14th	1st

=== Blancpain Endurance Series results ===
Year	Race	Team	Co-Drivers	Car	Class	Race Pos.
2015	Blancpain Endurance Series at Autodromo Nazionale Monza	(Austria) GRT Grasser Racing Team	(Italy) Fabio Babini (Netherlands) Jeroen Mul	Lamborghini Huracán GT3	PRO	1st
2015	Blancpain Endurance Series at Silverstone Circuit	(Austria) GRT Grasser Racing Team	(Italy) Fabio Babini (Netherlands) Jeroen Mul	Lamborghini Huracán GT3	PRO	14th
2015	Blancpain Endurance Series at Paul Ricard Circuit	(Austria) GRT Grasser Racing Team	(Italy) Fabio Babini (Netherlands) Jeroen Mul	Lamborghini Huracán GT3	PRO	DNF
2015	Blancpain Endurance Series at Circuit de Spa-Francorchamps	(Austria) GRT Grasser Racing Team	(Italy) Fabio Babini (Netherlands) Jeroen Mul	Lamborghini Huracán GT3	PRO	DNF
2015	Blancpain Endurance Series at Nürburgring	(Austria) GRT Grasser Racing Team	(Italy) Fabio Babini (Netherlands) Jeroen Mul	Lamborghini Huracán GT3	PRO	13th
