= 2010 Formula Renault 2.0 Northern European Cup =

Motor racing championship

2010 Formula Renault 2.0 NEC

Seasons
- ← 2009 2011 →

The 2010 Formula Renault 2.0 Northern European Cup was the fifth Formula Renault 2.0 Northern European Cup season. The season began at Hockenheim on 17 April and finished on 17 October at Nürburgring, after nineteen races. Making its début in the series in 2010 was the new-specification car, designed by Barazi-Epsilon. It replaced the Tatuus chassis that had been in the series since 2000, but the Tatuus cars were still used in the secondary Formula Renault 2000 Class.

KEO Racing driver Ludwig Ghidi won the main NEC championship title, having won two races during the season – the season-opening rounds at Hockenheim – but eleven further podiums helped him to claim his first ever car racing title. Mikkel Mac of the KTR team finished the season as runner-up, winning three races at Zandvoort and two at Oschersleben, but only featured three further times on the podium. Van Amersfoort Racing duo Jeroen Mul and Liroy Stuart took the next two placings in the final championship standings, with Mul taking two victories at Zandvoort and Oschersleben, while Stuart took four second places including one behind Mul. Team Astromega driver Sam Dejonghe completed the top five. Other drivers to win races were Eurocup champion Kevin Korjus, who won each of his five starts in the series for Koiranen Bros. Motorsport, Karl-Oscar Liiv won a pair of races for MP Motorsport at Assen, with Kevin Mirocha (SL Formula Racing, Nürburgring), Daniël de Jong (MP Motorsport, Nürburgring), Genís Olivé (Epsilon Euskadi, Spa-Francorchamps), Robin Frijns (Josef Kaufmann Racing, Spa-Francorchamps) and Will Stevens (MP Motorsport, Spa-Francorchamps) all winning a race each. One race was cancelled due to poor weather conditions.

In the Formula Renault 2000 class, five victories for Dear Schilling allowed KEO Racing to claim the FR2000 title along with Ghidi's success in the main class. Dear Schilling finished 15 points clear of runner-up Johann Ledermair, a four-time class winner running for his own Ledermair Motorsport team, who in turn finished 13 points clear of Daniel Schilling, the younger brother of Dear and his team-mate at KEO Racing, a three-time winner on the season. Tony Kowalewski took two wins en route to fourth place for TKP Racing, while Frank Suntjens was winless for the Speedlover team in fifth place. Other victories were claimed by Alessio Picariello, who took wins at Most and two at Spa for SL Formula Racing, with one each for Leopold Ringbom (P1 Motorsport, Nürburgring) and Amir Mesny (Josef Kaufmann Racing, Spa-Francorchamps) in late season outings.

== Teams and drivers ==
2010 Formula Renault 2.0 NEC Entry List
Team	No.	Driver name	Class	Rounds
(Italy) Cram Competition	4	(Brazil) André Negrão		2
(Denmark) KEO Racing	5	(Belgium) Ludwig Ghidi		All
(Denmark) KEO Racing	6	(United States) Robert Siska		2–3, 6–7
(Denmark) KEO Racing	8	(Netherlands) Kelvin Snoeks		3
(Denmark) KEO Racing	36	(Denmark) Dear Schilling	FR2000	All
(Denmark) KEO Racing	37	(Denmark) Daniel Schilling	FR2000	All
(Poland) Kochanski Motorsport	7	(Poland) Jakub Śmiechowski		All
(Poland) Kochanski Motorsport	33	(Poland) Sewerin Tobiasz Szczepanik	FR2000	1
(Poland) Kochanski Motorsport	39	(Poland) Maurycy Kochanski	FR2000	5, 7–8
(Netherlands) MP Motorsport	9	(Estonia) Karl-Oscar Liiv		2, 5, 8
(Netherlands) MP Motorsport	10	(Netherlands) Daniël de Jong		2, 5, 8
(Netherlands) MP Motorsport	22	(United Kingdom) Will Stevens		7
(Netherlands) MP Motorsport	30	(Finland) Kalle Kulmanen		2, 7
(Czech Republic) Krenek Motorsport	11	(Czech Republic) Adam Kout		2
(Czech Republic) Krenek Motorsport	14	(Czech Republic) Jakub Knoll		3
(Czech Republic) Krenek Motorsport	15	(Czech Republic) Petř Vlček		6
(Netherlands) Van Amersfoort Racing	13	(Netherlands) Jeroen Mul		All
(Netherlands) Van Amersfoort Racing	17	(Netherlands) Liroy Stuart		All
(Belgium) Team Astromega	16	(Belgium) Sam Dejonghe		All
(Austria) Interwetten Junior Team	18	(United Kingdom) Luciano Bacheta		2
(Austria) Interwetten Junior Team	19	(Germany) Craig Reiff		2
(Germany) SL Formula Racing	20	(Germany) Kevin Mirocha		4–5, 8
(Germany) SL Formula Racing	21	(Germany) Julian Eisenreich		1–3
(Germany) SL Formula Racing	38	(Germany) Michèle Di Martino	FR2000	1–2, 4–5, 8
(Germany) SL Formula Racing	44	(Germany) Sebastian von Gartzen	G	8
(Germany) SL Formula Racing	47	(Belgium) Alessio Picariello	FR2000	6–7
(Belgium) KTR	23	(Netherlands) Rogier de Wit		1–6
(Belgium) KTR	24	(Denmark) Mikkel Mac		All
(Finland) Koiranen Bros. Motorsport	25	(Finland) Jesse Laine		6
(Finland) Koiranen Bros. Motorsport	26	(Netherlands) Bart Hylkema		2, 6
(Finland) Koiranen Bros. Motorsport	27	(Finland) Miki Weckström		2
(Finland) Koiranen Bros. Motorsport	28	(Estonia) Kevin Korjus		2, 6
(Finland) Koiranen Bros. Motorsport	29	(Sweden) John Bryant-Meisner		6
(Belgium) Speedlover	31	(Netherlands) Frank Suntjens	FR2000	All
(Netherlands) TKP Racing	32	(Germany) Tony Kowalewski	FR2000	All
(Austria) Ledermair Motorsport	34	(Austria) Johann Ledermair	FR2000	All
(Germany) Boller	36	(Germany) Kai Boller	FR2000	1, 3–8
(Slovakia) Sophidea	40	(Slovakia) Richard Gonda	FR2000	1–2, 4, 6
(Finland) P1 Motorsport	42	(Estonia) Antti Rammo	FR2000	3
(Finland) P1 Motorsport	43	(Finland) Leopold Ringbom	FR2000	6–8
(Czech Republic) Palmi Racing	50	(Czech Republic) David Palmi	FR2000	2, 4, 6
(Czech Republic) Palmi Racing	51	(Czech Republic) Petř Vlček	FR2000	4
(Hungary) ACS Motorsport SE	52	(Hungary) Norbert Kiss	FR2000	6
(Hungary) ACS Motorsport SE	53	(Hungary) Attila Barta	FR2000	6
(Hungary) ACS Motorsport SE	55	(Hungary) István Rácz	FR2000	7
(France) ARTA Engineering	54	(France) Amir Mesny	FR2000	8
(France) ARTA Engineering	67	(France) Côme Ledogar		8
(Spain) Epsilon Euskadi	61	(Spain) Genís Olivé		7
(Spain) Epsilon Euskadi	62	(Spain) Javier Tarancón		7
(Spain) Epsilon Euskadi	63	(Italy) Giovanni Venturini		7
(Spain) Epsilon Euskadi	64	(Spain) Alex Riberas		7
(Germany) Josef Kaufmann Racing	66	(Netherlands) Robin Frijns		7
(Germany) Josef Kaufmann Racing	67	(France) Côme Ledogar		7

Icon	Class
FR2000	Formula Renault 2000 Class
G	Guest

== Race calendar and results ==
Round		Circuit	Country	Date	Pole position	Fastest lap	Winning driver	Winning team
1	R1	Hockenheimring	Germany	17 April	(Germany) Julian Eisenreich	(Belgium) Ludwig Ghidi	(Belgium) Ludwig Ghidi	(Denmark) KEO Racing
1	R2	Hockenheimring	Germany	18 April	(Belgium) Ludwig Ghidi	(Belgium) Ludwig Ghidi	(Belgium) Ludwig Ghidi	(Denmark) KEO Racing
2	R1	Masaryk Circuit, Brno	Czech Republic	25 April	(Estonia) Kevin Korjus	(Netherlands) Daniël de Jong	(Estonia) Kevin Korjus	(Finland) Koiranen Bros. Motorsport
2	R2	Masaryk Circuit, Brno	Czech Republic	25 April	(Estonia) Kevin Korjus	(Netherlands) Daniël de Jong	(Estonia) Kevin Korjus	(Finland) Koiranen Bros. Motorsport
3	R1	Circuit Park Zandvoort	Netherlands	5 June	(Netherlands) Jeroen Mul	(Netherlands) Jeroen Mul	(Netherlands) Jeroen Mul	(Netherlands) Van Amersfoort Racing
3	R2	Circuit Park Zandvoort	Netherlands	6 June	(Belgium) Ludwig Ghidi	(Netherlands) Jeroen Mul	(Denmark) Mikkel Mac	(Belgium) KTR
4	R1	Motorsport Arena Oschersleben	Germany	10 July	(Denmark) Mikkel Mac	(Netherlands) Jeroen Mul	(Denmark) Mikkel Mac	(Belgium) KTR
4	R2	Motorsport Arena Oschersleben	Germany	10 July	(Netherlands) Jeroen Mul	(Denmark) Mikkel Mac	(Netherlands) Jeroen Mul	(Netherlands) Van Amersfoort Racing
4	R3	Motorsport Arena Oschersleben	Germany	11 July	(Denmark) Mikkel Mac	(Denmark) Mikkel Mac	(Denmark) Mikkel Mac	(Belgium) KTR
5	R1	TT Circuit Assen	Netherlands	7 August	(Netherlands) Jeroen Mul	(Germany) Kevin Mirocha	(Estonia) Karl-Oscar Liiv	(Netherlands) MP Motorsport
5	R2	TT Circuit Assen	Netherlands	8 August	(Estonia) Karl-Oscar Liiv	(Germany) Kevin Mirocha	(Estonia) Karl-Oscar Liiv	(Netherlands) MP Motorsport
6	R1	Autodrom Most	Czech Republic	28 August	(Estonia) Kevin Korjus	(Estonia) Kevin Korjus	(Estonia) Kevin Korjus	(Finland) Koiranen Bros. Motorsport
6	R2	Autodrom Most	Czech Republic	29 August		(Estonia) Kevin Korjus	(Estonia) Kevin Korjus	(Finland) Koiranen Bros. Motorsport
6	R3	Autodrom Most	Czech Republic	29 August		(Estonia) Kevin Korjus	(Estonia) Kevin Korjus	(Finland) Koiranen Bros. Motorsport
7	R1	Circuit de Spa-Francorchamps	Belgium	2 October	(Spain) Alex Riberas	(Spain) Genís Olivé	(Spain) Genís Olivé	(Spain) Epsilon Euskadi
7	R2	Circuit de Spa-Francorchamps	Belgium	3 October	(Italy) Giovanni Venturini	(United Kingdom) Will Stevens	(United Kingdom) Will Stevens	(Netherlands) MP Motorsport
7	R3	Circuit de Spa-Francorchamps	Belgium	3 October	(Spain) Genís Olivé	(Netherlands) Robin Frijns	(Netherlands) Robin Frijns	(Germany) Josef Kaufmann Racing
8	R1	Nürburgring	Germany	16 October	(Netherlands) Daniël de Jong	(Estonia) Karl-Oscar Liiv	(Netherlands) Daniël de Jong	(Netherlands) MP Motorsport
8	R2	Nürburgring	Germany	17 October	(Germany) Kevin Mirocha	(Netherlands) Daniël de Jong	(Germany) Kevin Mirocha	(Germany) SL Formula Racing
8	R3	Nürburgring	Germany	17 October	(Netherlands) Daniël de Jong	race cancelled		

== Standings ==
=== Drivers' championship ===
- Championship points were awarded on a 30, 24, 20, 17, 16, 15, 14, 13, 12, 11, 10, 9, 8, 7, 6, 5, 4, 3, 2, 1 to the top 20 classified finishers in each race.

Pos	Driver	HOC (Germany)		BRN (Czech Republic)		ZAN (Netherlands)		OSC (Germany)			ASS (Netherlands)		MST (Czech Republic)			SPA (Belgium)			NÜR (Germany)			Total	Drop	Points
Pos	Driver	1	2	3	4	5	6	7	8	9	10	11	12	13	14	15	16	17	18	19	20	Total	Drop	Points
1	(Belgium) Ludwig Ghidi	1	**1**	5	4	3	**2**	3	3	3	5	3	3	3	3	3	8	2	6	5	C	381	13	368
2	(Denmark) Mikkel Mac	4	2	12	11	11	1	**1**	4	**1**	6	6	4	5	2	5	6	11	5	2	C	349	9	340
3	(Netherlands) Jeroen Mul	3	Ret	2	9	**1**	8	8	**1**	5	**3**	7	10	2	Ret	4	7	17	4	6	C	304		304
4	(Netherlands) Liroy Stuart	Ret	14	9	6	2	4	2	8	2	7	2	5	15	17	21	11	Ret	8	8	C	267		267
5	(Belgium) Sam Dejonghe	16	Ret	10	13	5	12	7	5	7	9	11	6	7	10	6	10	Ret	13	10	C	223		223
6	(Netherlands) Rogier de Wit	5	6	7	12	6	15	4	2	6	8	13	7	12	4							207		207
7	(Poland) Jakub Śmiechowski	7	4	20	20	7	9	6	6	8	11	9	Ret	17	22	Ret	Ret	16	9	9	C	193		193
8	(Estonia) Kevin Korjus			**1**	**1**								**1**	1	1							150		150
9	(Germany) Kevin Mirocha							5	7	4	2	5							3	**1**	C	137		137
10	(Estonia) Karl-Oscar Liiv			11	8						1	**1**							2	7	C	121		121
11	(Netherlands) Daniël de Jong			Ret	2						4	4							**1**	4	**C**	105		105
12	(Germany) Julian Eisenreich	**2**	Ret	4	7	4	Ret															72		72
13	(Spain) Genís Olivé															1	2	**4**				71		71
14	(Netherlands) Robin Frijns															2	5	1				70		70
15	(United States) Robert Siska			22	24								21	20	15	18	21	22				66		66
16	(France) Côme Ledogar															10	Ret	9	7	3	C	59		59
17	(United Kingdom) Will Stevens															9	1	6				58		58
18	(Netherlands) Bart Hylkema			6	10								Ret	4	18							54		54
19	(Czech Republic) Jakub Knoll			13	15																	53		53
20	(Finland) Jesse Laine												2	6	20							49		49
21	(Spain) Alex Riberas															**8**	9	3				46		46
22	(Sweden) John Bryant-Meisner												13	8	5							41		41
23	(Brazil) André Negrão			3	5																	36		36
24	(Spain) Javier Tarancón															Ret	3	5				36		36
25	(Finland) Kalle Kulmanen			Ret	17											16	Ret	10				35		35
26	(Italy) Giovanni Venturini															Ret	**4**	8				31		31
27	(Czech Republic) Petř Vlček												18	21	21							27		27
28	(Finland) Miki Weckström			8	14																	20		20
29	(Czech Republic) Adam Kout			Ret	3																	20		20
30	(Netherlands) Kelvin Snoeks					Ret	3															20		20
31	(Germany) Craig Reiff			Ret	16																	5		5
32	(United Kingdom) Luciano Bacheta			Ret	26																	1		1
FR2000 Class
1	(Denmark) Dear Schilling	6	5	15	18	12	6	17	9	Ret	15	14	9	9	6	13	16	Ret	16	16	C	371		371
2	(Austria) Johann Ledermair	11	3	14	19	Ret	7	10	15	9	18	8	14	Ret	Ret	11	19	12	11	12	C	356		356
3	(Denmark) Daniel Schilling	9	9	16	21	8	13	9	12	10	10	10	11	10	Ret	Ret	Ret	19	17	17	C	343		343
4	(Poland) Tony Kowalewski	10	8	17	Ret	9	5	11	14	15	12	12	15	Ret	19	17	Ret	15	10	13	C	305		305
5	(Netherlands) Frank Suntjens	8	7	19	25	Ret	11	12	13	12	13	15	19	Ret	7	12	13	Ret	18	DNS	C	269		269
6	(Germany) Kai Boller	12	11			Ret	14	14	17	11	14	18	20	13	8	Ret	18	20	DNS	Ret	C	205		205
7	(Germany) Michèle Di Martino	13	10	18	Ret			15	10	13	17	17							20	18	C	151		151
8	(Belgium) Alessio Picariello												8	11	12	7	15	7				142		142
9	(Finland) Leopold Ringbom												Ret	14	11	14	14	13	12	11	C	138		138
10	(Czech Republic) David Palmi			Ret	22			13	11	14			12	16	9							117		117
11	(Slovakia) Richard Gonda	14	13	21	23			16	16	16			Ret	Ret	16							107		107
12	(Poland) Maurycy Kochanski										16	16				18	17	18	19	19	C	97		97
13	(France) Amir Mesny															15	12	14	15	15	C	94		94
14	(Hungary) Attila Barta												17	19	13							41		41
15	(Estonia) Antti Rammo					10	10															37		37
16	(Hungary) István Rácz															20	20	21				36		36
17	(Poland) Sewerin Tobiasz Szczepanik	15	12																			25		25
18	(Hungary) Norbert Kiss												16	Ret	23							25		25
19	(United States) Robert Siska					Ret	16															13		13
20	(Czech Republic) Petř Vlček							Ret	Ret	17												12		12
guest drivers ineligible for points
	(Germany) Sebastian von Gartzen																		14	14	C	0		0
Pos	Driver	HOC (Germany)		BRN (Czech Republic)		ZAN (Netherlands)		OSC (Germany)			ASS (Netherlands)		MST (Czech Republic)			SPA (Belgium)			NÜR (Germany)			Total	Drop	Points

Colour	Result
Gold	Winner
Silver	Second place
Bronze	Third place
Green	Points classification
Blue	Non-points classification
Blue	Non-classified finish (NC)
Purple	Retired, not classified (Ret)
Red	Did not qualify (DNQ)
Red	Did not pre-qualify (DNPQ)
Black	Disqualified (DSQ)
White	Did not start (DNS)
White	Withdrew (WD)
White	Race cancelled (C)
Blank	Did not practice (DNP)
Blank	Did not arrive (DNA)
Blank	Excluded (EX)

**Bold** – Pole
Italics – Fastest Lap
