= 2022 New York City ePrix =

Race 11 of 16 of the 2021–22 Formula E season
← Previous race	Next race →

Race details
- Date: July 16, 2022
- Official name: 2022 New York City E-Prix
- Location: Brooklyn Street Circuit, Red Hook, Brooklyn
- Course: Street circuit
- Course length: 2.320 km (1.442 mi)
- Distance: 29 laps, 67.280 km (41.806 mi)

Pole position
Driver	(New Zealand) Nick Cassidy	Envision-Audi
- Time: 1:08:980

Fastest lap
Driver	(Switzerland) Edoardo Mortara	Venturi-Mercedes
- Time: 1:10:843 on lap 26

Podium
First	(New Zealand) Nick Cassidy	Envision-Audi
Second	(Brazil) Lucas di Grassi	Venturi-Mercedes
Third	(Netherlands) Robin Frijns	Envision-Audi

2022 New York City ePrix
Race 12 of 16 of the 2021–22 Formula E season
← Previous race	Next race →

Race details
- Date: July 17, 2022
- Official name: 2022 New York City E-Prix
- Location: Brooklyn Street Circuit, Red Hook, Brooklyn
- Course: Street circuit
- Course length: 2.320 km (1.442 mi)
- Distance: 39 laps, 90.480 km (56.222 mi)

Pole position
Driver	(New Zealand) Nick Cassidy	Envision-Audi
- Time: 1:08:584

Fastest lap
Driver	(Switzerland) Edoardo Mortara	Venturi-Mercedes
- Time: 1:10:378 on lap 29

Podium
First	(Portugal) António Félix da Costa	DS Techeetah
Second	(Belgium) Stoffel Vandoorne	Mercedes
Third	(New Zealand) Mitch Evans	Jaguar

The 2022 New York City ePrix was a pair of Formula E electric car races held at the Brooklyn Street Circuit in the Red Hook neighbourhood of the New York City borough of Brooklyn on July 16 and 17, 2022. It marked the eleventh and twelfth rounds of the 2021–22 Formula E season, as well as the fifth and final running of the event. The first race was won by Nick Cassidy, ahead of Lucas di Grassi and Robin Frijns. António Félix da Costa won the second race, with Stoffel Vandoorne and Mitch Evans rounding out the podium.

== Classification ==
=== Race one ===
==== Qualifying ====
Group draw
Group A	(Switzerland) MOR	(Belgium) VAN	(Netherlands) FRI	(Netherlands) DEV	(Germany) LOT	(United Kingdom) DEN	(New Zealand) CAS	(Switzerland) BUE	(United States) ASK	(Germany) GUE	(Brazil) SET
Group B	(France) JEV	(New Zealand) EVA	(Portugal) DAC	(Brazil) DIG	(Germany) WEH	(United Kingdom) BIR	(United Kingdom) ROW	(United Kingdom) TUR	(United Kingdom) SIM	(United Kingdom) TIC	(Italy) GIO

==== Qualifying duels ====
Quarter-finals
B4	(Germany) Pascal Wehrlein
A1	(Netherlands) Robin Frijns
B3	(United Kingdom) Sam Bird
A2	(New Zealand) Nick Cassidy
A3	(Belgium) Stoffel Vandoorne
B2	(United Kingdom) Alexander Sims
A4	(Switzerland) Sébastien Buemi
B1	(Brazil) Lucas di Grassi

Semi-finals
(Germany) Pascal Wehrlein
(New Zealand) Nick Cassidy
(Belgium) Stoffel Vandoorne
(Brazil) Lucas di Grassi

Final
(New Zealand) Nick Cassidy
(Belgium) Stoffel Vandoorne

===== Overall classification =====
Pos.	No.	Driver	Team	A	B	QF	SF	F	Grid
1	37	(New Zealand) Nick Cassidy	Envision-Audi	1:09:640	—N/a	1:13:657	1:10:367	1:08:980	1
2	5	(Belgium) Stoffel Vandoorne	Mercedes	1:09:650	—N/a	1:13:040	1:09:515	1:08:988	2
3	11	(Brazil) Lucas di Grassi	Venturi-Mercedes	—N/a	1:10:678	1:12:546	1:09:559	—N/a	3
4	94	(Germany) Pascal Wehrlein	Porsche	—N/a	1:12:330	1:14:011	1:10:515	—N/a	4
5	23	(Switzerland) Sébastien Buemi	e.dams-Nissan	1:09:769	—N/a	1:12:661	—N/a	—N/a	5
6	29	(United Kingdom) Alexander Sims	Mahindra	—N/a	1:10:751	1:13:220	—N/a	—N/a	6
7	4	(Netherlands) Robin Frijns	Envision-Audi	1:09:528	—N/a	1:14:799	—N/a	—N/a	7
8	10	(United Kingdom) Sam Bird	Jaguar	—N/a	1:12:239	1:14:998	—N/a	—N/a	8
9	48	(Switzerland) Edoardo Mortara	Venturi-Mercedes	1:09:777	—N/a	—N/a	—N/a	—N/a	9
10	13	(Portugal) António Félix da Costa	Techeetah-DS	—N/a	1:12:464	—N/a	—N/a	—N/a	10
11	17	(Netherlands) Nyck de Vries	Mercedes	1:09:810	—N/a	—N/a	—N/a	—N/a	11
12	30	(United Kingdom) Oliver Rowland	Mahindra	—N/a	1:09:937	—N/a	—N/a	—N/a	12
13	27	(United Kingdom) Jake Dennis	Andretti-BMW	1:09:937	—N/a	—N/a	—N/a	—N/a	13
14	9	(New Zealand) Mitch Evans	Jaguar	—N/a	1:12:693	—N/a	—N/a	—N/a	14
15	22	(Germany) Maximilian Günther	e.dams-Nissan	1:10:022	—N/a	—N/a	—N/a	—N/a	15
16	25	(France) Jean-Éric Vergne	Techeetah-DS	—N/a	1:13:598	—N/a	—N/a	—N/a	16
17	36	(Germany) André Lotterer	Porsche	1:10:084	—N/a	—N/a	—N/a	—N/a	17
18	33	(United Kingdom) Dan Ticktum	NIO	—N/a	1:13:716	—N/a	—N/a	—N/a	18
19	28	(United States) Oliver Askew	Andretti-BMW	1:16:319	—N/a	—N/a	—N/a	—N/a	22
20	99	(Italy) Antonio Giovinazzi	Dragon-Penske	—N/a	1:14:580	—N/a	—N/a	—N/a	19
21	7	(Brazil) Sérgio Sette Câmara	Dragon-Penske	—N/a	—N/a	—N/a	—N/a	—N/a	20
22	3	(United Kingdom) Oliver Turvey	NIO	—N/a	1:15:130	—N/a	—N/a	—N/a	21

==== Race ====
Pos.	No.	Driver	Team	Laps	Time/Retired	Grid	Points
1	37	(New Zealand) Nick Cassidy	Envision-Audi	29	35:04:095	1	25+3^{1}
2	11	(Brazil) Lucas di Grassi	Venturi-Mercedes	29	+1.123	3	18
3	4	(Netherlands) Robin Frijns	Envision-Audi	29	+1.671	7	15
4	5	(Belgium) Stoffel Vandoorne	Mercedes	29	+3.693	2	12
5	23	(Switzerland) Sébastien Buemi	e.dams-Nissan	29	+5.570	5	10
6	94	(Germany) Pascal Wehrlein	Porsche	29	+5.783	4	8
7	10	(United Kingdom) Sam Bird	Jaguar	29	+7.207	8	6
8	17	(Netherlands) Nyck de Vries	Mercedes	29	+7.503	11	4
9	48	(Switzerland) Edoardo Mortara	Venturi-Mercedes	29	+9.734 (Note: Mortara was given a 5-second time penalty for speeding under full course yellow.)	9	2+1^{2}
10	27	(United Kingdom) Jake Dennis	Andretti-BMW	29	+11.595 (Note: Dennis was given a 5-second time penalty for speeding under full course yellow.)	13	1
11	9	(New Zealand) Mitch Evans	Jaguar	29	+13.605 (Note: Evans was given a 5-second time penalty for speeding under full course yellow.)	14	
12	22	(Germany) Maximilian Günther	e.dams-Nissan	29	+13.763	15	
13	30	(United Kingdom) Oliver Rowland	Mahindra	29	+14.924	12	
14	29	(United Kingdom) Alexander Sims	Mahindra	29	+16.648	6	
15	3	(United Kingdom) Oliver Turvey	NIO	29	+19.707	21	
16	36	(Germany) André Lotterer	Porsche	29	+24.384 (Note: Lotterer was given a 10-second time penalty for causing a collision with Félix da Costa.)	17	
17	33	(United Kingdom) Dan Ticktum	NIO	29	+25.312	18	
18	25	(France) Jean-Éric Vergne	DS Techeetah	29	+53.018	16	
19	28	(United States) Oliver Askew	Andretti-BMW	29	+1:22.282 (Note: Askew was given a 21-second time penalty for failing to activate the second Attack Mode.)	22	
Ret	13	(Portugal) António Félix da Costa	DS Techeetah	28	Puncture	10	
Ret	99	(Italy) Antonio Giovinazzi	Dragon-Penske	0	Collision Damage	19	
DNS	7	(Brazil) Sérgio Sette Câmara	Dragon-Penske	0	Damage	20	

Notes:

- ^1 – Pole position.
- ^2 – Fastest lap.

==== Standings after the race ====
Drivers' Championship standings

	Pos	Driver	Points
	1	(Switzerland) Edoardo Mortara	144
1	2	(Belgium) Stoffel Vandoorne	137
1	3	(France) Jean-Éric Vergne	128
	4	(New Zealand) Mitch Evans	124
	5	(Netherlands) Robin Frijns	96

Teams' Championship standings

	Pos	Constructor	Points
	1	(Monaco) Venturi-Mercedes	226
1	2	(Germany) Mercedes	214
1	3	(France) DS Techeetah	203
	4	(United Kingdom) Jaguar	161
1	5	(United Kingdom) Envision-Audi	140

- Notes: Only the top five positions are included for both sets of standings.

=== Race two ===
==== Qualifying ====
Group draw
Group A	(Switzerland) MOR	(France) JEV	(Netherlands) FRI	(Netherlands) DEV	(Germany) WEH	(New Zealand) CAS	(United Kingdom) BIR	(United Kingdom) ROW	(United States) ASK	(Germany) GUE	(Brazil) SET
Group B	(Belgium) VAN	(New Zealand) EVA	(Brazil) DIG	(Portugal) DAC	(Germany) LOT	(United Kingdom) DEN	(Switzerland) BUE	(United Kingdom) TUR	(United Kingdom) SIM	(United Kingdom) TIC	(Italy) GIO

==== Qualifying duels ====
Quarter-finals
B4	(Germany) André Lotterer
A1	(Brazil) Sérgio Sette Câmara
B3	(Belgium) Stoffel Vandoorne
A2	(New Zealand) Nick Cassidy
A3	(Netherlands) Nyck de Vries
B2	(Portugal) António Félix da Costa
A4	(United Kingdom) Alexander Sims
B1	(New Zealand) Mitch Evans

Semi-finals
(Germany) André Lotterer
(New Zealand) Nick Cassidy
(Portugal) António Félix da Costa
(United Kingdom) Alexander Sims

Final
(New Zealand) Nick Cassidy
(Portugal) António Félix da Costa

===== Overall classification =====
Pos.	No.	Driver	Team	A	B	QF	SF	F	Grid
1	37	(New Zealand) Nick Cassidy	Envision-Audi	1:09:608	—N/a	1:08:657	1:08:795	1:08:584	22^{1}
2	13	(Portugal) António Félix da Costa	Techeetah-DS	—N/a	1:09:407	1:08:721	1:08:681	1:08:751	1
3	29	(United Kingdom) Alexander Sims	Mahindra	1:09:692	—N/a	1:08:796	1:08:830	—N/a	2
4	36	(Germany) André Lotterer	Porsche	—N/a	1:09:467	1:08:685	1:10:420	—N/a	3
5	7	(Brazil) Sérgio Sette Câmara	Dragon-Penske	1:09:566	—N/a	1:08:726	—N/a	—N/a	4
6	5	(Belgium) Stoffel Vandoorne	Mercedes	—N/a	1:09:453	1:08:765	—N/a	—N/a	5
7	9	(New Zealand) Mitch Evans	Jaguar	—N/a	1:09:371	1:08:802	—N/a	—N/a	6
8	17	(Netherlands) Nyck de Vries	Mercedes	1:09:670	—N/a	1:08:880	—N/a	—N/a	7
9	28	(United States) Oliver Askew	Andretti-BMW	1:09:742	—N/a	—N/a	—N/a	—N/a	8
10	27	(United Kingdom) Jake Dennis	Andretti-BMW	—N/a	1:09:492	—N/a	—N/a	—N/a	9
11	4	(Netherlands) Robin Frijns	Envision-Audi	1:09:760	—N/a	—N/a	—N/a	—N/a	10
12	99	(Italy) Antonio Giovinazzi	Dragon-Penske	—N/a	1:09:528	—N/a	—N/a	—N/a	11
13	25	(France) Jean-Éric Vergne	Techeetah-DS	1:09:795	—N/a	—N/a	—N/a	—N/a	12
14	23	(Switzerland) Sébastien Buemi	e.dams-Nissan	—N/a	1:09:645	—N/a	—N/a	—N/a	13
15	30	(United Kingdom) Oliver Rowland	Mahindra	1:09:853	—N/a	—N/a	—N/a	—N/a	14
16	22	(Germany) Maximilian Günther	e.dams-Nissan	—N/a	1:09:660	—N/a	—N/a	—N/a	15
17	10	(United Kingdom) Sam Bird	Jaguar	1:09:957	—N/a	—N/a	—N/a	—N/a	16
18	33	(United Kingdom) Dan Ticktum	NIO	—N/a	1:09:688	—N/a	—N/a	—N/a	17
19	94	(Germany) Pascal Wehrlein	Porsche	1:34:007	—N/a	—N/a	—N/a	—N/a	20
20	11	(Brazil) Lucas di Grassi	Venturi-Mercedes	—N/a	1:09:700	—N/a	—N/a	—N/a	18
21	48	(Switzerland) Edoardo Mortara	Venturi-Mercedes	—N/a	—N/a	—N/a	—N/a	—N/a	21
22	3	(United Kingdom) Oliver Turvey	NIO	—N/a	1:09:870	—N/a	—N/a	—N/a	19

Notes:

- ^1 – Cassidy received a 30-place grid penalty and a drive-through penalty to be served at the race for battery replacement.

==== Race ====
Pos.	No.	Driver	Team	Laps	Time/Retired	Grid	Points
1	13	(Portugal) António Félix da Costa	DS Techeetah	39	46:55:511	1	25
2	5	(Belgium) Stoffel Vandoorne	Mercedes	39	+0.929	5	18
3	20	(New Zealand) Mitch Evans	Jaguar	39	+3.524	6	15
4	29	(United Kingdom) Alexander Sims	Mahindra	39	+3.631	2	12
5	10	(United Kingdom) Sam Bird	Jaguar	39	+4.412	16	10
6	4	(Netherlands) Robin Frijns	Envision-Audi	39	+4.979	10	8
7	17	(Netherlands) Nyck de Vries	Mercedes	39	+6.233	7	6
8	27	(United Kingdom) Jake Dennis	Andretti-BMW	39	+6.316	9	4
9	36	(Germany) André Lotterer	Porsche	39	+6.590	3	2
10	48	(Switzerland) Edoardo Mortara	Venturi-Mercedes	39	+13.449	21	1+1^{2}
11	94	(Germany) Pascal Wehrlein	Porsche	39	+18.469	20	
12	33	(United Kingdom) Dan Ticktum	NIO	39	+23.002	17	
13	23	(Switzerland) Sébastien Buemi	e.dams-Nissan	39	+30.216	13	
14	30	(United Kingdom) Oliver Rowland	Mahindra	39	+32.676	14	
15	37	(New Zealand) Nick Cassidy	Envision-Audi	39	+39.699	22	3^{1}
16	3	(United Kingdom) Oliver Turvey	NIO	39	+43.255	19	
17	7	(Brazil) Sérgio Sette Câmara	Dragon-Penske	39	+1:08.193	4	
Ret	25	(France) Jean-Éric Vergne	DS Techeetah	37	Collision damage	12	
Ret	11	(Brazil) Lucas di Grassi	Venturi-Mercedes	36	Collision damage	18	
Ret	28	(United States) Oliver Askew	Andretti-BMW	36	Collision damage	8	
Ret	99	(Italy) Antonio Giovinazzi	Dragon-Penske	12	Battery	11	
DSQ	22	(Germany) Maximilian Günther	e.dams-Nissan	39	Energy Usage	15	

Notes:

- ^1 – Pole position.
- ^2 – Fastest lap.

==== Standings after the race ====
Drivers' Championship standings

	Pos	Driver	Points
1	1	(Belgium) Stoffel Vandoorne	155
1	2	(Switzerland) Edoardo Mortara	144
1	3	(New Zealand) Mitch Evans	139
1	4	(France) Jean-Éric Vergne	128
	5	(Netherlands) Robin Frijns	104

Teams' Championship standings

	Pos	Constructor	Points
1	1	(Germany) Mercedes	238
1	2	(Monaco) Venturi-Mercedes	228
	3	(France) DS Techeetah	228
	4	(United Kingdom) Jaguar	186
	5	(United Kingdom) Envision-Audi	151

- Notes: Only the top five positions are included for both sets of standings.

== Notes ==
Previous race: 2022 Marrakesh ePrix	FIA Formula E World Championship; 2021–22 season	Next race: 2022 London ePrix
Previous race: 2021 New York City ePrix	New York City ePrix	Next race: N/A
