= Sanya ePrix =

Formula E race in Sanya, China

- Sanya Street Circuit (2026)
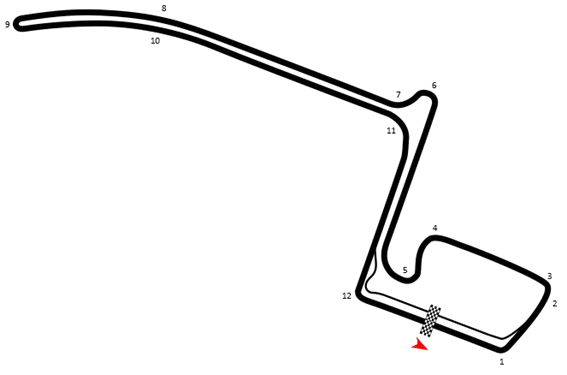

Race information
- Number of times held: 2
- First held: 2019
- Circuit length: 2.520 km (1.566 miles)

Last race (2026)

Pole position
- (United Kingdom) Jake Dennis; Andretti-Porsche; 1:05.502

Podium
- 1. (United Kingdom) Jake Dennis; Andretti-Porsche; 1:09:08.646; 2. (Spain) Pepe Martí; Cupra Kiro-Porsche; +2.104; 3. (Netherlands) Nyck de Vries; Mahindra; +2.855

Fastest lap
- (Netherlands) Nyck de Vries; Mahindra; 1:08.455

The Sanya ePrix is a race of the all-electric Formula E championship held in Sanya, Hainan, China. It debuted during the 2018–19 Formula E season on the Sanya Street Circuit. The race was won by Jean-Éric Vergne for DS Techeetah. Planned events in subsequent seasons were cancelled due to the COVID-19 pandemic, before Formula E announced Sanya would return to the calendar in 2026.

== Background ==
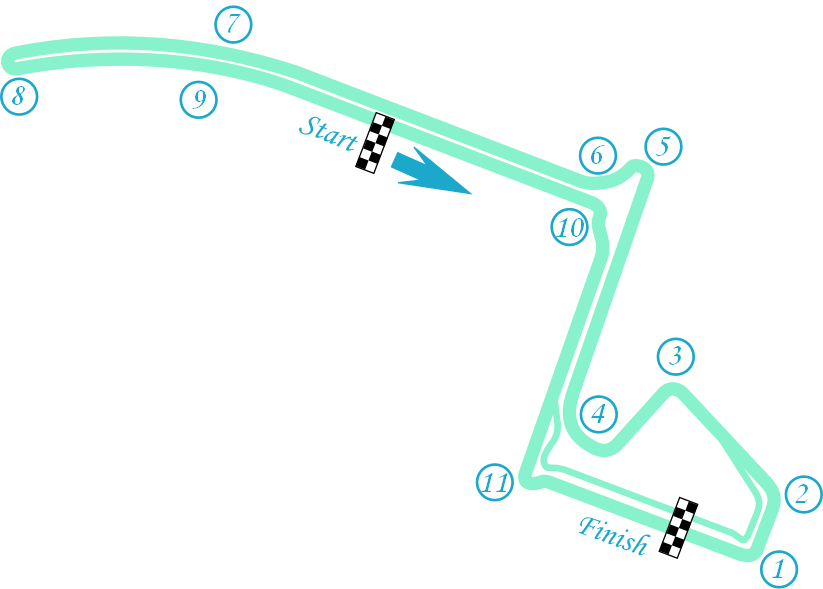
The original track layout used in the 2019 Sanya ePrix.

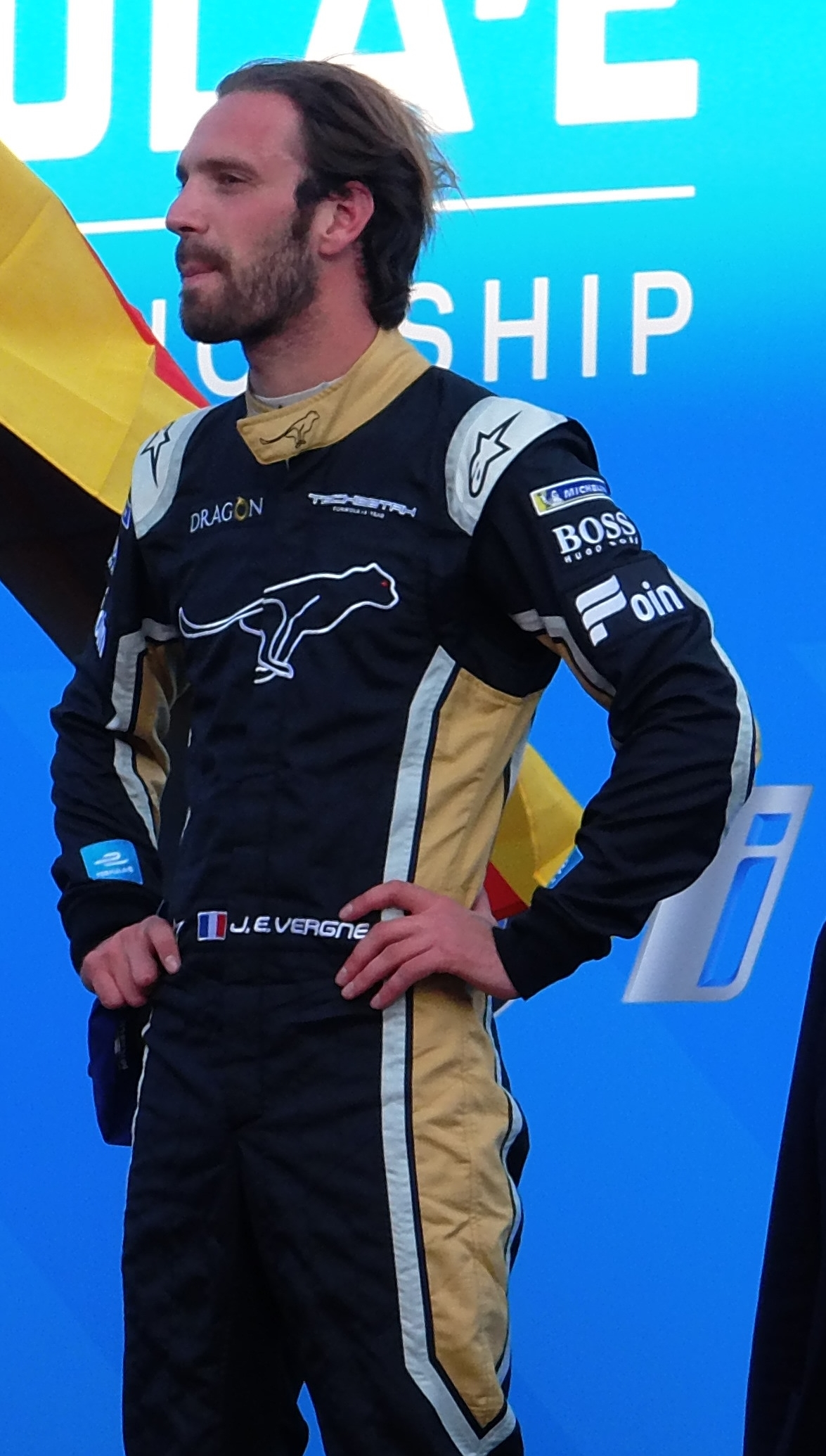
Jean-Éric Vergne won the first Formula E race held in Sanya

In July 2018 it was announced that Formula E would be held in Sanya for the 2018–19 season.

The inaugural race took place on 23 March 2019 on the original 2.236 km (1.389 mi) layout, as Race 6 of the calendar. The event was won by Jean-Éric Vergne driving for DS Techeetah. The race was not without incidents, with an early crash causing Stoffel Vandoorne and Sam Bird to retire, before finishing the race under a yellow flag due an incident involving Robin Frijns, Lucas Di Grassi and Sebastien Buemi.

The Sanya ePrix was on the Formula E schedule for March 2020, but was cancelled due to the COVID-19 pandemic. The race was due to return in March 2021, but it did not materialise and again for March 2023, before Formula E announced later that year in October it would return to China, but instead on a modified layout of the Shanghai International Circuit for the 2024 Formula E Season.

In October 2025, Formula E confirmed that the Sanya ePrix would return for the 2025–26 Formula E season after a seven-year hiatus, remaining at the Haitang Bay venue with minor circuit modifications.

== Circuit ==
The Sanya ePrix was hosted on the Haitang Bay Circuit which located 24 km (15 mi) from the city. It was a 2.236 km (1.389 mi) temporary street circuit with 11 corners. The circuit ran anticlockwise. The circuit featured a number of tight 90° and 180° turns, whilst also enjoying two long straights that passed over two bridges. The pitlane exited between turns 2 and 3, and the "Attack Mode" boost was located on the outside of Turn 3's exit. The pit and paddock was a temporary construction in a car park.

Before the circuit hosted the 2019 Sanya ePrix, it was treated with a resin to ensure it did not break up.

== Results ==
| Season | Track | Winner | | Pole position | Fastest lap | Report | Ref |
| Season | Track | Driver | Constructor | Pole position | Fastest lap | Report | Ref |
|---|---|---|---|---|---|---|---|
| 2018–19 | Sanya Street Circuit | (France) Jean-Éric Vergne | (China) Techeetah-DS | (United Kingdom) Oliver Rowland | (France) Jean-Éric Vergne | Report | |
| 2019–20 | Sanya Street Circuit | Cancelled due to COVID-19 | | | | | |
| 2025–26 | Sanya Street Circuit | (United Kingdom) Jake Dennis | (United States) Andretti-Porsche | (United Kingdom) Jake Dennis | (Netherlands) Nyck de Vries | Report | |
