= New York City ePrix =

- Brooklyn Street Circuit (2021–2022)
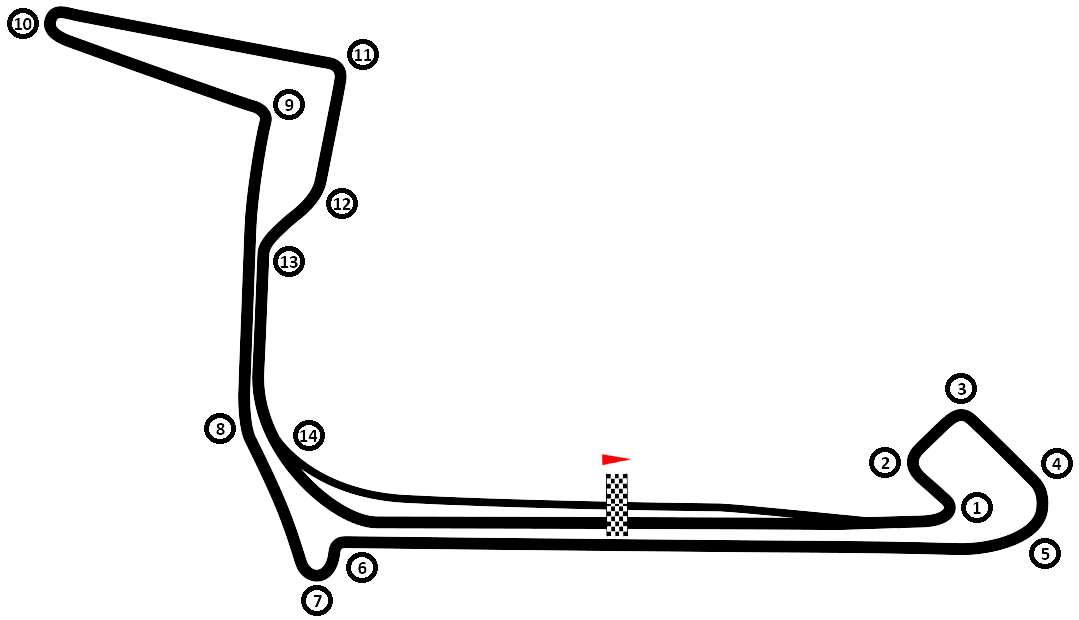

Race information
- Number of times held: 5
- First held: 2017
- Last held: 2022
- Most wins (drivers): (United Kingdom) Sam Bird (3)
- Most wins (constructors): (United Kingdom) Virgin (3)
- Circuit length: 2.374 km (1.475 miles)
- Laps: 39

Last race (2022 Race 2)

Pole position
- (New Zealand) Nick Cassidy; Envision-Audi; 1:08.584

Podium
- 1. (Portugal) A. Felix da Costa; Techeetah-DS; 46:55.511; 2. (Belgium) S. Vandoorne; Mercedes-EQ; +0.929; 3. (New Zealand) Mitch Evans; Jaguar; +2.595

Fastest lap
- (Switzerland) E. Mortara; Venturi-Mercedes; 1:10.378

The New York City ePrix was an annual race of the single-seater, electrically powered Formula E championship held in Brooklyn, New York. The inaugural event, the 2017 New York City ePrix, was a two-race event on July 15–16, 2017. The race did not return for the 2023 calendar, replaced by a race in Portland, Oregon.

== Circuit ==
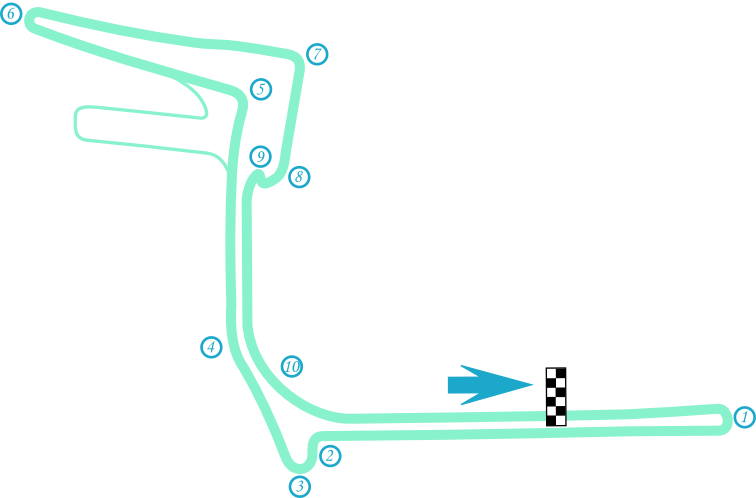
The old 2017 layout of the circuit, with the hairpin at turn 1

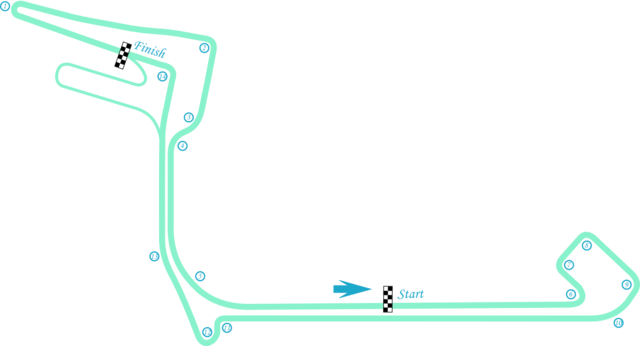
The extended layout used in 2018–2019

The race was held on the Brooklyn Street Circuit, an enclosed track that has a bridge crossing the track and 2 grandstands along with the Allianz Village.

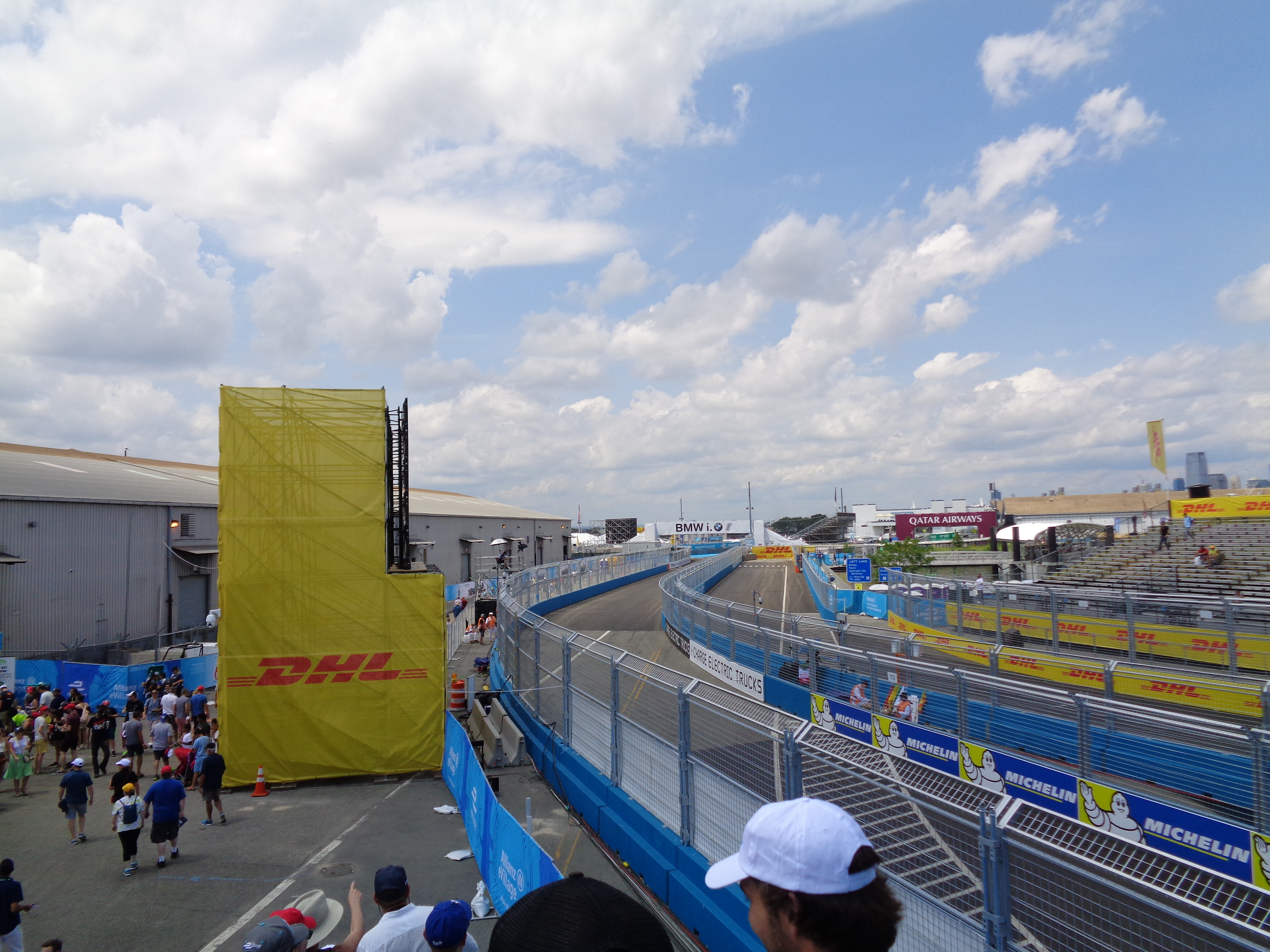
2017 New York ePrix - Saturday 43

== Results ==
Edition	Track	Winner	Second	Third	Pole position	Fastest lap	Ref
2017 Race 1	Brooklyn	(United Kingdom) Sam Bird; Virgin-Citroën	(France) Jean-Éric Vergne; Techeetah-Renault	(France) Stéphane Sarrazin; Techeetah-Renault	(United Kingdom) Alex Lynn; Virgin-Citroën	(Germany) Maro Engel; Venturi	
2017 Race 2	Brooklyn	(United Kingdom) Sam Bird; Virgin-Citroën	(Sweden) Felix Rosenqvist; Mahindra	(Germany) Nick Heidfeld; Mahindra	(United Kingdom) Sam Bird; Virgin-Citroën	(Germany) Daniel Abt; Audi Sport ABT	
2018 Race 1	Brooklyn	(Brazil) Lucas Di Grassi; Audi	(Germany) Daniel Abt; Audi	(Switzerland) Sébastien Buemi e.Dams-Renault	(Switzerland) Sébastien Buemi e.Dams-Renault	(Sweden) Felix Rosenqvist; Mahindra	
2018 Race 2	Brooklyn	(France) Jean-Éric Vergne; Techeetah-Renault	(Brazil) Lucas Di Grassi; Audi	(Germany) Daniel Abt; Audi	(Switzerland) Sébastien Buemi e.Dams-Renault	(Germany) Daniel Abt; Audi	
2019 Race 1	Brooklyn	(Switzerland) Sébastien Buemi e.Dams-Nissan	(New Zealand) Mitch Evans; Jaguar	(Portugal) Antonio Felix da Costa; Andretti-BMW	(Switzerland) Sébastien Buemi e.Dams-Nissan	(France) Jean Eric Vergne; Techeetah-DS	
2019 Race 2	Brooklyn	(Netherlands) Robin Frijns; Virgin-Audi	(United Kingdom) Alexander Sims; Andretti-BMW	(Switzerland) Sébastien Buemi e.Dams-Nissan	(United Kingdom) Alexander Sims; Andretti-BMW	(Germany) Daniel Abt; Audi	
2021 Race 1	Brooklyn	(Germany) Maximilian Günther; Andretti-BMW	(France) Jean Eric Vergne; Techeetah-DS	(Brazil) Lucas di Grassi; Audi	(New Zealand) Nick Cassidy; Envision Virgin Racing	(United Kingdom) Sam Bird; Jaguar	
2021 Race 2	Brooklyn	(United Kingdom) Sam Bird; Jaguar	(New Zealand) Nick Cassidy e.Dams-Nissan	(Portugal) António Félix da Costa; Techeetah-DS	(United Kingdom) Sam Bird; Jaguar	(Portugal) António Félix da Costa; Techeetah-DS	
2022 Race 1	Brooklyn	(New Zealand) Nick Cassidy; Envision-Audi	(Brazil) Lucas di Grassi; Venturi-Mercedes	(Netherlands) Robin Frijns; Envision-Audi	(New Zealand) Nick Cassidy; Envision-Audi	(Switzerland) Edoardo Mortara; Venturi-Mercedes	
2022 Race 2	Brooklyn	(Portugal) António Félix da Costa; Techeetah-DS	(Belgium) Stoffel Vandoorne; Mercedes	(New Zealand) Mitch Evans; Jaguar	(Portugal) António Félix da Costa; Techeetah-DS	(Switzerland) Edoardo Mortara; Venturi-Mercedes	

=== Repeat winners (drivers) ===
Wins	Driver	Years won
3	(United Kingdom) Sam Bird	2017 (Race 1), 2017 (Race 2), 2021 (Race 2)
