= 2019 Sanya ePrix =

Race 6 of 13 of the 2018–19 Formula E season
← Previous race	Next race →
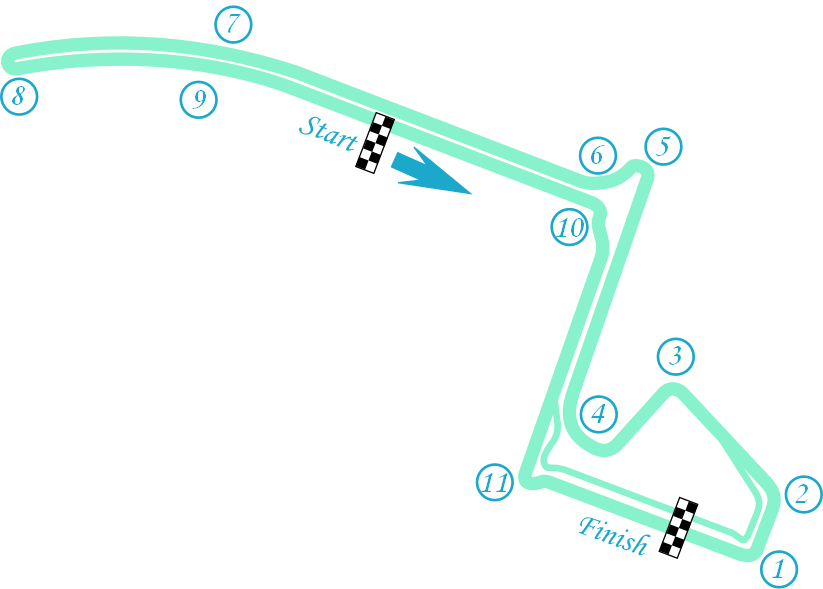

Race details
- Date: 23 March 2019
- Official name: 2019 FWD Sanya E-Prix
- Location: Haitang Bay Circuit, Sanya
- Course: Street circuit
- Course length: 2.236 km (1.389 miles)
- Weather: Cloudy

Pole position
Driver	(United Kingdom) Oliver Rowland	e.Dams-Nissan
- Time: 1:07.945

Fastest lap
Driver	(France) Jean-Éric Vergne	Techeetah-DS
- Time: 1:09.965 on lap 35

Podium
First	(France) Jean-Éric Vergne	Techeetah-DS
Second	(United Kingdom) Oliver Rowland	e.Dams-Nissan
Third	(Portugal) António Félix da Costa	Andretti-BMW

The 2019 Sanya ePrix (formally the 2019 FWD Sanya E-Prix) was a Formula E electric motor race held in Sanya on the Chinese island of Hainan on 23 March 2019. It was the 6th race of the 2018–19 Formula E season, and the first Sanya ePrix.

== Report ==
=== Background ===
The Sanya ePrix was announced as part of the 2018–19 calendar in June 2018 by Formula E founder, Alejandro Agag, and was confirmed as season 5's 6th race on 10 January 2019. It was the first time an ePrix was held in Sanya and was run on the Haitang Bay Circuit.

Going into the race, Sam Bird led the championship with 54 points and a point over Jérôme d'Ambrosio and 2 points over Lucas di Grassi and Edoardo Mortara, who were tied on 52 points after Mortara's win in the previous round in Hong Kong. In the teams championship, Virgin Racing led with 97 points, Audi Sport ABT Schaeffler in second place with 86 points, after jumping ahead of Mahindra, by scoring a double points finish and Mahindra's double retirement in the previous round.

=== Practice ===
Two practice sessions—both on Saturday morning—were held before the late afternoon race. The first session ran for 45 minutes and the second for half an hour. During the session, Oliver Rowland led the way during the first Practice session after setting a time of 1:07.561, ahead of both BMW Andretti driver Antonio Felix da Costa and his teammate Alexander Sims. During the session, several drivers ran deep into the run-off area at turn 5. The notable incidents happened when Virgin Racing driver Robin Frijns rubbing the wall multiple times during the session.

The second practice session was underway an hour and a half later. The Nissan e.Dams driver Sébastien Buemi hit the wall at turn 3. Despite the incident, he rejoined and set the fastest of the second practice with 1:07.288, ahead of Da Costa in second, and his teammate, Rowland in third. During the session, Mahindra driver Pascal Wehrlein, and HWA driver Gary Paffett hit the wall at the exit of turn 6. Both drivers returned to the pits afterwards to fix the damage to their cars for the rest of the second practice.

=== Qualifying ===
Saturday's 75-minute afternoon qualifying session was divided into two groups of five cars and two groups of six entries. Each group was determined by a lottery system and was permitted six minutes of on-track activity. All drivers were limited to two timed laps with one at maximum power. The fastest six overall competitors in the four groups participated in a "super pole" session with one driver on the track at any time going out in reverse order from fifth to first. Each of the five drivers was limited to one timed lap and the starting order was determined by the competitors' fastest times (super pole from first to fifth, and group qualifying from sixth to twentieth). The driver and team who recorded the fastest time were awarded three points towards their respective championships.

In group one, BMW Andretti driver Antonio Felix da Costa was fastest, ahead of d'Ambrosio, and Di Grassi. The championship leader, Sam Bird, would start from 16th in the overall qualifying session. ABT was fastest in group two, with Lotterer behind, but only 7th overall. In the third group, Buemi set the fastest lap, ahead of BMW Andretti driver Alexander Sims, and his teammate, Oliver Rowland. Vergne and Massa were fourth and fifth ahead of the NIO driver of Oliver Turvey in sixth. In group four, Stoffel Vandoorne in the HWA Racelab set the fastest lap of the group four qualifying, with the Dragon driver José María López came in second, and NIO driver Tom Dillmann in third. In the super pole session, Rowland took his first pole position of the season with a time of 1:07.945, after his teammate Buemi hit the wall again in turn 3. He would start in the front row alongside the DS Techeetah driver Jean-Éric Vergne, who was second. Alexander Sims didn't set his super pole time because a gear selection issue on his car.

=== Post-qualifying ===
After qualifying, Sébastien Buemi was disqualified from the Super Pole session for brake infringement, dropping him to sixth, before he had to start from the pit lane after replacing a part of his car. The HWA Racelab driver Gary Paffett also started from the pit lane after fixing an issue of his car.

=== Race ===
At the start, everyone get off the line well except for Nasr because his Dragon failed to get off the line, he later move the car again before retiring. Soon after, Vandoorne and Bird collided, resulting in both drivers retiring, Jose Maria Lopez also retired and parked in the run-off area to maintain the race. When attack mode was activated, Massa, Turvey and Buemi went to the first attack, Lucas Di Grassi also used it but he tried three times before the mode activated.. When 21 minutes and 59 seconds was left on the clock, Vergne went for the overtake on Rowland and moved into the lead. From there, he built a 1-second gap from Rowland to activate attack mode. Then Sims and Lotterer went side-by-side and Sims contacted the wall, ending his race and causing the full course yellow and then a red flag. When the race resumed after 12 minutes, every driver except for Mortara, da Costa Turvey, Dillmann did not activate the second attack mode. During the penultimate lap, Buemi shoved Frijns to di Grassi, which resulted in his retirement and a full-course yellow. This caused everyone to slow down, which allowed Vergne to win the race.

=== Post-race ===
After the race, Buemi been awarded a 10 seconds penalty for causing a collision. Mortara was awarded a drive-through penalty converted to 16 seconds after he failed to activate the attack mode for a second time. The penalty promoted Massa to tenth.

This event marked the final Formula E entry of the season 1 champion Nelson Piquet Jr.

== Classification ==
=== Qualifying ===
Pos.	No.	Driver	Team	Time	Gap	Grid
1	22	(United Kingdom) Oliver Rowland	e.Dams-Nissan	1:07.945	-	1
2	25	(France) Jean Eric Vergne	Techeetah-DS	1:08.045	+0.100	2
3	28	(Portugal) Antonio Felix da Costa	Andretti-BMW	1:08.122	+0.177	3
4	66	(Germany) Daniel Abt	Audi	1:08.331	+0.386	4
5	27	(United Kingdom) Alexander Sims	Andretti-BMW	no time	no time	5
6	23	(Switzerland) Sébastien Buemi	e.Dams-Nissan	1:07.670	-	PL^{1}
7	36	(Germany) André Lotterer	Techeetah-DS	1:08.371	+0.701	7
8	64	(Belgium) Jérôme d'Ambrosio	Mahindra	1:08.372	+0.702	8
9	94	(Germany) Pascal Wehrlein	Mahindra	1:08.455	+0.785	9
10	11	(Brazil) Lucas Di Grassi	Audi	1:08.468	+0.798	10
11	48	(Switzerland) Edoardo Mortara	Venturi	1:08.504	+0.834	11
12	4	(Netherlands) Robin Frijns	Virgin-Audi	1:08.546	+0.876	12
13	5	(Belgium) Stoffel Vandoorne	HWA-Venturi	1:08.560	+0.890	13
14	7	(Argentina) José María López	Dragon-Penske	1:08.568	+0.898	14
15	19	(Brazil) Felipe Massa	Venturi	1:08.585	+0.915	15
16	2	(United Kingdom) Sam Bird	Virgin-Audi	1:08.641	+0.971	16
17	8	(France) Tom Dillmann	NIO	1:08.800	+1.130	17
18	6	(Brazil) Felipe Nasr	Dragon-Penske	1:08.823	+1.153	18
19	16	(United Kingdom) Oliver Turvey	NIO	1:08.923	+1.253	19
20	20	(New Zealand) Mitch Evans	Jaguar	1:08.955	+1.285	20
21	17	(United Kingdom) Gary Paffett	HWA-Venturi	1:09.072	+1.402	PL^{2}
22	3	(Brazil) Nelson Piquet Jr.	Jaguar	1:09.399	+1.729	22

Notes

- ^1 — Sébastien Buemi was disqualified from the Super Pole session for brake infringement.
- ^2 — Gary Paffett started from the pit lane after replacing a mechanical part of his car.

=== Race ===
Pos.	No.	Driver	Team	Laps	Time/Retired	Grid	Points
1	25	(France) Jean-Éric Vergne	Techeetah-DS	36	1:02:50.185	2	25+1^{5}
2	22	(United Kingdom) Oliver Rowland	e.Dams-Nissan	36	+1.762	1	18+3^{6}
3	28	(Portugal) António Félix da Costa	Andretti-BMW	36	+3.268	3	15
4	36	(Germany) André Lotterer	Techeetah-DS	36	+4.631	7	12
5	66	(Germany) Daniel Abt	Audi	36	+5.972	4	10
6	64	(Belgium) Jérôme d'Ambrosio	Mahindra	36	+17.340	8	8
7	94	(Germany) Pascal Wehrlein	Mahindra	36	+18.367	9	6
8	23	(Switzerland) Sébastien Buemi	e.Dams-Nissan	36	+19.405^{3}	PL	4
9	20	(New Zealand) Mitch Evans	Jaguar	36	+20.646	20	2
10	19	(Brazil) Felipe Massa	Venturi	36	+27.739	15	1
11	16	(United Kingdom) Oliver Turvey	NIO	36	+31.453	19	0
12	8	(France) Tom Dillmann	NIO	36	+32.654	17	0
13	48	(Switzerland) Edoardo Mortara	Venturi	36	+38.208^{4}	11	0
Ret	4	(Netherlands) Robin Frijns	Virgin-Audi	35	Collision damage	12	0
Ret	11	(Brazil) Lucas Di Grassi	Audi	34	Collision	10	0
Ret	3	(Brazil) Nelson Piquet Jr.	Jaguar	21	Accident	22	0
Ret	27	(United Kingdom) Alexander Sims	Andretti-BMW	20	Accident	5	0
Ret	17	(United Kingdom) Gary Paffett	HWA-Venturi	13	Driveshaft	PL	0
Ret	7	(Argentina) José María López	Dragon-Penske	10	Powertrain	14	0
Ret	5	(Belgium) Stoffel Vandoorne	HWA-Venturi	1	Collision	13	0
Ret	2	(United Kingdom) Sam Bird	Virgin-Audi	1	Collision	16	0
Ret	6	(Brazil) Felipe Nasr	Dragon-Penske	1	Technical	18	0

Notes

- ^3 — Sébastien Buemi received 10-second time penalty for causing a collision.
- ^4 — Edoardo Mortara received a drive through penalty converted into a 16-second time penalty for not activating the second attack mode usage.
- ^5 — Fastest lap.
- ^6 — Pole position.

== Standings after the race ==
Drivers' Championship standings

+/–	Pos	Driver	Points
4	1	(Portugal) António Félix da Costa	62
	2	(Belgium) Jérôme d'Ambrosio	61
8	3	(France) Jean-Éric Vergne	54
3	4	(United Kingdom) Sam Bird	54
2	5	(Brazil) Lucas di Grassi	52

Teams' Championship standings

+/–	Pos	Constructor	Points
	1	(United Kingdom) Virgin-Audi	97
1	2	(India) Mahindra	97
1	3	(Germany) Audi Sport ABT Schaeffler	96
2	4	(China) DS Techeetah	95
	5	(United States) BMW i Andretti Motorsport	80

Previous race: 2019 Hong Kong ePrix	FIA Formula E Championship; 2018–19 season	Next race: 2019 Rome ePrix
Previous race: N/A	Sanya ePrix	Next race: 2026 Sanya ePrix
