= Sanya Street Circuit =

Street circuit of Sanya

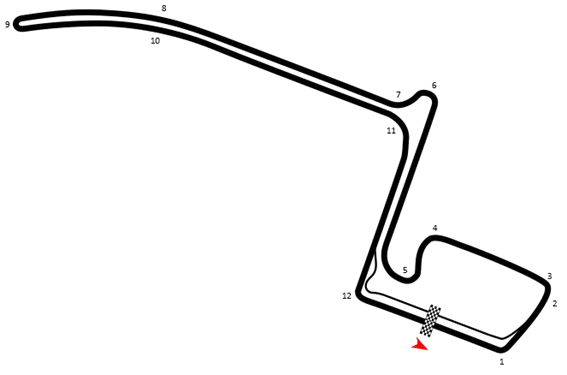
- Formula E Circuit (2026)

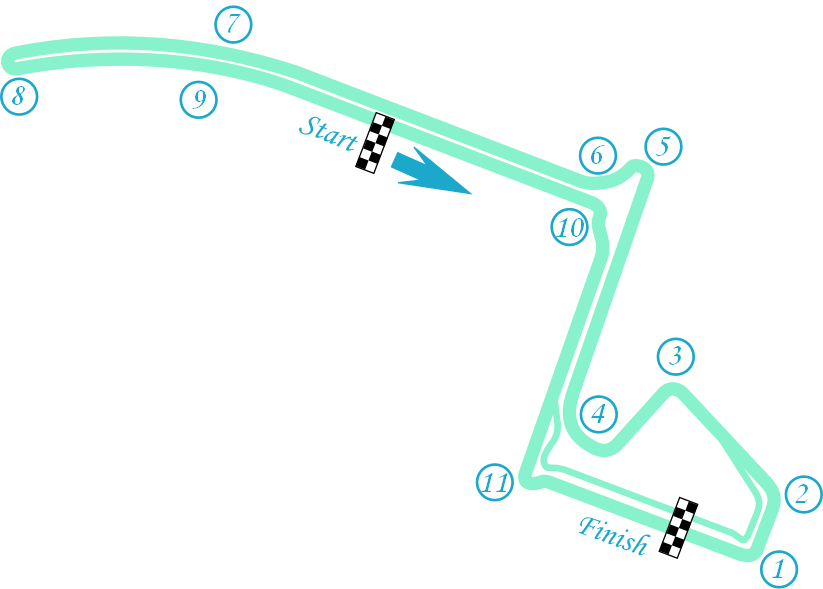
- Formula E Circuit (2019)
- Location: Sanya, China
- Coordinates: 18°21′18″N 109°44′13″E
- Opened: 21 March 2019; 7 years ago Re-opened: 19 June 2026; 4 months ago
- Closed: 23 March 2019; 7 years ago
- Former names: Haitang Bay Circuit (2019)
- Major events: Current: Formula E Sanya ePrix (2019, 2026); Former: Jaguar I-Pace eTrophy (2019)

Formula E Circuit (2026)
- Length: 2.520 km (1.566 mi)
- Turns: 12
- Race lap record: 1:08.455 ( (Netherlands) Nyck de Vries, Mahindra M12Electro, 2026, F-E)

Formula E Circuit (2019)
- Length: 2.236 km (1.389 mi)
- Turns: 11
- Race lap record: 1:09.965 ( (France) Jean Eric Vergne, DS E-Tense FE 19, 2019, F-E)

The Sanya Street Circuit is a street circuit located in the Haitang Bay area of Sanya, in the Chinese island of Hainan. It was used for the Sanya ePrix of the single-seater, electrically powered Formula E championship on 23 March 2019.

== Layout ==
The track was originally 2.236 km (1.389 mi) in length and featured 11 turns. Prior to the race, it was decided to treat the track surface with a resin-type material, in a bid to prevent a repeat of a prior round in Santiago, which saw the track break up during the race due to the high temperatures. The track returned to Formula E in 2026, with extended 2.520 km (1.566 mi) in length by featuring 12 turns.

== Lap records ==
As of June 2026, the fastest official race lap records at the Sanya Street Circuit are listed as:

Category	Time	Driver	Vehicle	Event
Formula E Circuit (2026): 2.520 km (1.566 mi)
Formula E	1:08.455	Nyck de Vries	Mahindra M12Electro	2026 Sanya ePrix
Formula E Circuit (2019): 2.236 km (1.389 mi)
Formula E	1:09.965	Jean Eric Vergne	DS E-Tense FE 19	2019 Sanya ePrix
Jaguar I-Pace eTrophy	1:28.357	Bryan Sellers	Jaguar I-Pace eTrophy car	2019 Sanya Jaguar I-Pace eTrophy round
