= 2019 New York City ePrix =

Race 12 of 13 of the 2018–19 Formula E season
← Previous race
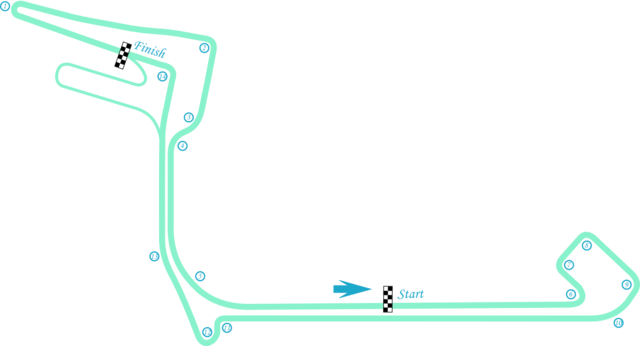

Race details
- Date: July 13, 2019
- Official name: 2019 New York City E-Prix
- Location: Brooklyn Street Circuit, Red Hook, Brooklyn
- Course: Street circuit
- Course length: 1.475 mi (2.374 km)
- Distance: 36 laps, 53.100 mi (85.456 km)
- Weather: Sunny

Pole position
Driver	(Switzerland) Sébastien Buemi	e.Dams-Nissan
- Time: 1:10.188

Fastest lap
Driver	(France) Jean-Éric Vergne	Techeetah-DS
- Time: 1:12.063 on lap 35

Podium
First	(Switzerland) Sébastien Buemi	e.Dams-Nissan
Second	(New Zealand) Mitch Evans	Jaguar
Third	(Portugal) António Félix da Costa	Andretti-BMW

2019 New York City ePrix
Race 13 of 13 of the 2018–19 Formula E season
← Previous race
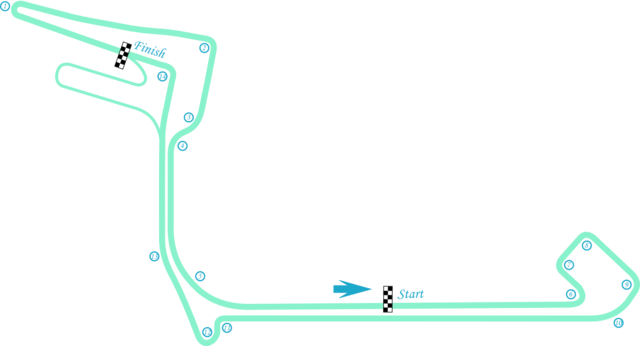

Race details
- Date: July 14, 2019
- Official name: 2019 New York City E-Prix
- Location: Brooklyn Street Circuit, Red Hook, Brooklyn
- Course: Street circuit
- Course length: 1.475 mi (2.374 km)
- Distance: 36 laps, 53.100 mi (85.456 km)
- Weather: Sunny

Pole position
Driver	(United Kingdom) Alexander Sims	Andretti-BMW
- Time: 1:09.617

Fastest lap
Driver	(Germany) Daniel Abt	Audi
- Time: 1:11.305 on lap 23

Podium
First	(Netherlands) Robin Frijns	Envision Virgin Racing
Second	(United Kingdom) Alexander Sims	Andretti-BMW
Third	(Switzerland) Sébastien Buemi	e.Dams-Nissan

The 2019 New York City ePrix was a pair of ePrix which were the final two races of the 2018–19 Formula E season held in Brooklyn, New York around the Brooklyn Street Circuit. This was the third running of the New York City ePrix.

Heading into the weekend it was Jean-Éric Vergne who led the drivers championship by 32 points. He managed to maintain his lead to take the championship after the second race, thus becoming the first driver to win multiple Formula E Drivers' Championship titles.

== Classification ==
=== Race one ===
==== Qualifying ====
Group draw
Group 1	(France) JEV (1)	(Brazil) DIG (2)	(New Zealand) EVA (3)	(Germany) LOT (4)	(Portugal) DAC (5)	—N/a
Group 2	(Netherlands) FRI (6)	(Switzerland) BUE (7)	(Germany) ABT (8)	(United Kingdom) BIR (9)	(Belgium) DAM (10)	—N/a
Group 3	(United Kingdom) ROW (11)	(Switzerland) MOR (12)	(Germany) WEH (13)	(Brazil) MAS (14)	(Belgium) VAN (15)	(United Kingdom) SIM (16)
Group 4	(Germany) GUN (17)	(United Kingdom) LYN (18)	(United Kingdom) PAF (19)	(United Kingdom) TUR (20)	(Argentina) LOP (21)	(France) DIL (23)

Pos.	No.	Driver	Team	GS	SP	Grid
1	23	(Switzerland) Sébastien Buemi	e.Dams-Nissan	1:10.556	1:10.188	1
2	94	(Germany) Pascal Wehrlein	Mahindra	1:10.589	1:10.600	2
3	3	(United Kingdom) Alex Lynn	Jaguar	1:10.669	1:10.696	3
4	66	(Germany) Daniel Abt	Audi	1:10.761	1:10.894	4
5	27	(United Kingdom) Alexander Sims	Andretti-BMW	1:10.590	1:10.899	5
6	2	(United Kingdom) Sam Bird	Virgin-Audi	1:10.588	1:11.094	6
7	7	(Argentina) José María López	Dragon-Penske	1:10.836	—N/a	7
8	28	(Portugal) António Félix da Costa	Andretti-BMW	1:10.845	—N/a	8
9	4	(Netherlands) Robin Frijns	Virgin-Audi	1:10.854	—N/a	9
10	25	(France) Jean-Éric Vergne	Techeetah-DS	1:10.933	—N/a	10
11	6	(Germany) Maximilian Günther	Dragon-Penske	1:11.005	—N/a	11
12	8	(France) Tom Dillmann	NIO	1:11.006	—N/a	12
13	20	(New Zealand) Mitch Evans	Jaguar	1:11.065	—N/a	13
14	11	(Brazil) Lucas di Grassi	Audi	1:11.080	—N/a	14
15	17	(United Kingdom) Gary Paffett	HWA-Venturi	1:11.095	—N/a	15
16	36	(Germany) André Lotterer	Techeetah-DS	1:11.222	—N/a	16
17	48	(Switzerland) Edoardo Mortara	Venturi	1:11.326	—N/a	21^{1}
18	16	(United Kingdom) Oliver Turvey	NIO	1:11.413	—N/a	17
19	5	(Belgium) Stoffel Vandoorne	HWA-Venturi	1:11.449	—N/a	18
20	22	(United Kingdom) Oliver Rowland	e.Dams-Nissan	1:11.605	—N/a	19
21	19	(Brazil) Felipe Massa	Venturi	1:14.862	—N/a	20
NC	64	(Belgium) Jérôme d'Ambrosio	Mahindra	1:18.262	—N/a	22^{2}

Notes:

- ^1 – Edoardo Mortara received a five-place grid drop for causing a collision in the previous race and two additional penalty points.
- ^2 – Jérôme d'Ambrosio did not fulfill the qualifying criteria by not setting a (competitive) lap time. The Stewards permitted d'Ambrosio to start the race.

==== Race ====
Pos.	No.	Driver	Team	Laps	Time/Retired	Grid	Points
1	23	(Switzerland) Sébastien Buemi	e.Dams-Nissan	36	46:16.399	1	25+3^{3}
2	20	(New Zealand) Mitch Evans	Jaguar	36	+0.932	13	18
3	28	(Portugal) António Félix da Costa	Andretti-BMW	36	+1.216	8	15
4	27	(United Kingdom) Alexander Sims	Andretti-BMW	36	+2.971	5	12
5	11	(Brazil) Lucas di Grassi	Audi	36	+3.537	14	10
6	66	(Germany) Daniel Abt	Audi	36	+4.380	4	8+1^{4}
7	94	(Germany) Pascal Wehrlein	Mahindra	36	+6.543	2	6
8	2	(United Kingdom) Sam Bird	Virgin-Audi	36	+13.829^{1}	6	4
9	64	(Belgium) Jérôme d'Ambrosio	Mahindra	36	+23.719^{2}	22	2
10	16	(United Kingdom) Oliver Turvey	NIO	36	+25.038	17	1
11	17	(United Kingdom) Gary Paffett	HWA-Venturi	36	+27.831	15	
12	7	(Argentina) José María López	Dragon-Penske	36	+34.729	7	
13	5	(Belgium) Stoffel Vandoorne	HWA-Venturi	36	+50.564	18	
14	22	(United Kingdom) Oliver Rowland	e.Dams-Nissan	36	+1:23.962	19	
15	25	(France) Jean-Éric Vergne	Techeetah-DS	36	+1:34.508	10	
16	19	(Brazil) Felipe Massa	Venturi	35	Collision damage	20	
17	36	(Germany) André Lotterer	Techeetah-DS	35	+1 lap	16	
Ret	6	(Germany) Maximilian Günther	Dragon-Penske	28	Collision damage	11	
Ret	48	(Switzerland) Edoardo Mortara	Venturi	27	Accident	21	
Ret	3	(United Kingdom) Alex Lynn	Jaguar	18	Technical	3	
Ret	4	(Netherlands) Robin Frijns	Virgin-Audi	15	Collision damage	9	
Ret	8	(France) Tom Dillmann	NIO	1	Collision damage	12	

Notes:

- ^1 – Sam Bird received a ten-second time penalty after causing a collision.
- ^2 – Jérôme d'Ambrosio received a five-second time penalty after forcing another driver off-track.
- ^3 – Pole position.
- ^4 – Fastest lap.

=== Standings after the race ===
Drivers' Championship standings

+/–	Pos	Driver	Points
	1	(France) Jean-Éric Vergne	130
	2	(Brazil) Lucas di Grassi	108
	3	(New Zealand) Mitch Evans	105
3	4	(Switzerland) Sébastien Buemi	104
	5	(Portugal) António Félix da Costa	97

Teams' Championship standings

+/–	Pos	Constructor	Points
	1	(China) DS Techeetah	216
	2	(Germany) Audi Sport ABT Schaeffler	192
1	3	(France) e.Dams-Nissan	167
1	4	(United Kingdom) Virgin-Audi	154
1	5	(United States) BMW	133

- Notes: Only the top five positions are included for both sets of standings.

=== Race two ===
==== Qualifying ====
Group draw
Group 1	(France) JEV (1)	(Brazil) DIG (2)	(New Zealand) EVA (3)	(Switzerland) BUE (4)	(Portugal) DAC (5)	—N/a
Group 2	(Germany) LOT (6)	(Germany) ABT (7)	(Netherlands) FRI (8)	(United Kingdom) BIR (9)	(Belgium) DAM (10)	—N/a
Group 3	(United Kingdom) ROW (11)	(Germany) WEH (12)	(Switzerland) MOR (13)	(Brazil) MAS (14)	(United Kingdom) SIM (15)	(Belgium) VAN (16)
Group 4	(Germany) GUN (17)	(United Kingdom) LYN (18)	(United Kingdom) PAF (19)	(United Kingdom) TUR (20)	(Argentina) LOP (21)	(France) DIL (23)

Pos.	No.	Driver	Team	GS	SP	Grid
1	27	(United Kingdom) Alexander Sims	Andretti-BMW	1:09.690	1:09.617	1
2	4	(Netherlands) Robin Frijns	Virgin-Audi	1:09.839	1:09.712	2
3	23	(Switzerland) Sébastien Buemi	e.Dams-Nissan	1:09.930	1:09.729	3
4	2	(United Kingdom) Sam Bird	Virgin-Audi	1:09.852	1:09.895	4
5	5	(Belgium) Stoffel Vandoorne	HWA-Venturi	1:09.783	1:09.994	5
6	66	(Germany) Daniel Abt	Audi	1:09.829	1:10.096	6
7	22	(United Kingdom) Oliver Rowland	e.Dams-Nissan	1:09.979	—N/a	7
8	20	(New Zealand) Mitch Evans	Jaguar	1:09.990	—N/a	8
9	17	(United Kingdom) Gary Paffett	HWA-Venturi	1:10.082	—N/a	9
10	48	(Switzerland) Edoardo Mortara	Venturi	1:10.144	—N/a	10
11	11	(Brazil) Lucas di Grassi	Audi	1:10.182	—N/a	11
12	25	(France) Jean-Éric Vergne	Techeetah-DS	1:10.205	—N/a	12
13	7	(Argentina) José María López	Dragon-Penske	1:10.279	—N/a	13
14	28	(Portugal) António Félix da Costa	Andretti-BMW	1:10.296	—N/a	14
15	16	(United Kingdom) Oliver Turvey	NIO	1:10.366	—N/a	15
16	64	(Belgium) Jérôme d'Ambrosio	Mahindra	1:10.431	—N/a	16
17	8	(France) Tom Dillmann	NIO	1:10.500	—N/a	20^{1}
18	94	(Germany) Pascal Wehrlein	Mahindra	1:10.501	—N/a	17
19	6	(Germany) Maximilian Günther	Dragon-Penske	1:10.580	—N/a	18
20	36	(Germany) André Lotterer	Techeetah-DS	1:10.626	—N/a	19
21	3	(United Kingdom) Alex Lynn	Jaguar	1:12.464	—N/a	21^{2}
NC	19	(Brazil) Felipe Massa	Venturi	1:19.758	—N/a	22^{3}

Notes:

- ^1 – Tom Dillmann received a 3-place grid penalty for impeeding Gary Paffett during his flying lap.
- ^2 – Alex Lynn received a 20-place grid penalty for changing E-Motor (MGU). Since Lynn qualified 21st, he was unable to take the full grid drop, resulting in that penalty being replaced by a drive-through penalty.
- ^3 – Felipe Massa did not fulfill the qualifying criteria by not setting a flying lap time. The Stewards permitted Massa to start the race.

==== Race ====
Pos.	No.	Driver	Team	Laps	Time/Retired	Grid	Points
1	4	(Netherlands) Robin Frijns	Virgin-Audi	36	47:22.289	2	25
2	27	(United Kingdom) Alexander Sims	Andretti-BMW	36	+3.200	1	18+3^{4}
3	23	(Switzerland) Sébastien Buemi	e.Dams-Nissan	36	+3.912	3	15
4	2	(United Kingdom) Sam Bird	Virgin-Audi	36	+4.270	4	12
5	66	(Germany) Daniel Abt	Audi	36	+4.757	6	10+1^{5}
6	22	(United Kingdom) Oliver Rowland	e.Dams-Nissan	36	+8.382	7	8
7	25	(France) Jean-Éric Vergne	Techeetah-DS	36	+9.446	12	6
8	5	(Belgium) Stoffel Vandoorne	HWA-Venturi	36	+9.738	5	4
9	28	(Portugal) António Félix da Costa	Andretti-BMW	36	+11.727	14	2
10	17	(United Kingdom) Gary Paffett	HWA-Venturi	36	+12.251	9	1
11	64	(Belgium) Jérôme d'Ambrosio	Mahindra	36	+18.944	16	
12	94	(Germany) Pascal Wehrlein	Mahindra	36	+27.144	17	
13	16	(United Kingdom) Oliver Turvey	NIO	36	+28.045	15	
14	8	(France) Tom Dillmann	NIO	36	+28.580	20	
15	19	(Brazil) Felipe Massa	Venturi	36	+28.635	22	
16	3	(United Kingdom) Alex Lynn	Jaguar	36	+41.420^{1}	21	
17	20	(New Zealand) Mitch Evans	Jaguar	36	+1:27.009^{1}^{,}^{2}	8	
18	11	(Brazil) Lucas di Grassi	Audi	35	Collision	11	
19	6	(Germany) Maximilian Günther	Dragon-Penske	34	Energy	18	
Ret	48	(Switzerland) Edoardo Mortara	Venturi	17	Brakes	10	
Ret	36	(Germany) André Lotterer	Techeetah-DS	3	Collision damage^{3}	19	
Ret	7	(Argentina) José María López	Dragon-Penske	2	Collision damage	13	

Notes:

- ^1 – Both Panasonic Jaguar Racing drivers (Lynn and Evans) received a drive through penalty converted into a 22-second time penalty for exceeding the maximum battery temperature.
- ^2 – Mitch Evans received a 10-second stop and go penalty converted into a 37-second time penalty for causing a collision with Lucas di Grassi.
- ^3 – André Lotterer received a 22-second time penalty for causing a dangerous collision with José María López and three additional penalty points.
- ^4 – Pole position.
- ^5 – Fastest lap.

=== Standings after the race ===
Drivers' Championship standings

+/–	Pos	Driver	Points
	1	(France) Jean-Éric Vergne	136
2	2	(Switzerland) Sébastien Buemi	119
1	3	(Brazil) Lucas di Grassi	108
4	4	(Netherlands) Robin Frijns	106
2	5	(New Zealand) Mitch Evans	104

Teams' Championship standings

+/–	Pos	Constructor	Points
	1	(China) DS Techeetah	222
	2	(Germany) Audi Sport ABT Schaeffler	203
	3	(France) e.Dams-Nissan	191
	4	(United Kingdom) Virgin-Audi	190
	5	(United States) BMW	156

- Notes: Only the top five positions are included for both sets of standings.

Previous race: 2019 Swiss ePrix	FIA Formula E Championship; 2018–19 season	Next race: 2019 Diriyah ePrix
Previous race: 2018 New York City ePrix	New York City ePrix	Next race: 2021 New York City ePrix
