= 2021 New York City ePrix =

Race 10 of 15 of the 2020–21 Formula E season
← Previous race	Next race →

Race details
- Date: July 10, 2021
- Official name: 2021 ABB New York City E-Prix
- Location: Brooklyn Street Circuit, Red Hook, Brooklyn
- Course: Street circuit
- Course length: 2.320 km (1.442 mi)
- Distance: 38 laps, 88.160 km (54.780 mi)

Pole position
Driver	(New Zealand) Nick Cassidy	Virgin-Audi
- Time: 1:09.338

Fastest lap
Driver	(France) Norman Nato (United Kingdom) Sam Bird (Note: Bird received the point for fastest lap as Nato failed to finish in the top 10.)	Venturi-Mercedes; Jaguar
- Time: 1:10.823 (1:11.082) on lap 22 (21)

Podium
First	(Germany) Maximilian Günther	Andretti-BMW
Second	(France) Jean-Éric Vergne	Techeetah-DS
Third	(Brazil) Lucas di Grassi	Audi

2021 New York City ePrix
Race 11 of 15 of the 2020–21 Formula E season
← Previous race	Next race →

Race details
- Date: July 11, 2021
- Official name: 2021 ABB New York City E-Prix
- Location: Brooklyn Street Circuit, Red Hook, Brooklyn
- Course: Street circuit
- Course length: 2.320 km (1.442 mi)
- Distance: 37 laps, 85.840 km (53.339 mi)

Pole position
Driver	(United Kingdom) Sam Bird	Jaguar
- Time: 1:08.572

Fastest lap
Driver	(New Zealand) Mitch Evans (Portugal) António Félix da Costa (Note: Da Costa received the point for fastest lap as Evans failed to finish in the top 10.)	Jaguar; Techeetah-DS
- Time: 1:10.050 (1:10.180) on lap 17 (18)

Podium
First	(United Kingdom) Sam Bird	Jaguar
Second	(New Zealand) Nick Cassidy	Virgin-Audi
Third	(Portugal) António Félix da Costa	Techeetah-DS

The 2021 New York City ePrix (formally the 2021 ABB New York City E-Prix) was a pair of Formula E electric car races held at the Brooklyn Street Circuit in the Red Hook neighbourhood of the New York City borough of Brooklyn on July 10 and 11, 2021. It marked the tenth and eleventh rounds of the 2020–21 Formula E season, as well as the fourth running of the event. The first race was won by Maximilian Günther, ahead of Jean-Éric Vergne and Lucas di Grassi. Sam Bird won the second race to claim the championship lead, with Nick Cassidy and António Félix da Costa rounding out the podium.

== Classification ==
=== Race one ===
==== Qualifying ====
Group draw
Group 1	(Switzerland) MOR (1)	(Netherlands) FRI (2)	(Portugal) DAC (3)	(Germany) RAS (4)	(New Zealand) EVA (5)	(Netherlands) DEV (6)
Group 2	(Belgium) VAN (7)	(United Kingdom) DEN (8)	(United Kingdom) ROW (9)	(France) JEV (10)	(United Kingdom) BIR (11)	(Germany) WEH (12)
Group 3	(Brazil) DIG (13)	(New Zealand) CAS (14)	(United Kingdom) SIM (15)	(United Kingdom) LYN (16)	(Germany) GUE (18)	(Germany) LOT (19)
Group 4	(United Kingdom) TUR (20)	(Brazil) SET (21)	(Switzerland) BUE (22)	(France) NAT (23)	(United Kingdom) BLO (24)	(Sweden) ERI (25)

Pos.	No.	Driver	Team	GS	SP	Grid
1	37	(New Zealand) Nick Cassidy	Virgin-Audi	1:09.672	1:09.338	1
2	25	(France) Jean-Éric Vergne	Techeetah-DS	1:09.599	1:09.499	2
3	94	(United Kingdom) Alex Lynn	Mahindra	1:09.746	1:09.538	3
4	28	(Germany) Maximilian Günther	Andretti-BMW	1:09.718	1:09.614	4
5	23	(Switzerland) Sébastien Buemi	e.dams-Nissan	1:09.531	1:09.713	5
6	99	(Germany) Pascal Wehrlein	Porsche	1:09.667	1:09.752	6
7	11	(Brazil) Lucas di Grassi	Audi	1:09.759	—N/a	7
8	22	(United Kingdom) Oliver Rowland	e.dams-Nissan	1:09.891	—N/a	8
9	29	(United Kingdom) Alexander Sims	Mahindra	1:09.892	—N/a	9
10	36	(Germany) André Lotterer	Porsche	1:10.028	—N/a	10
11	4	(Netherlands) Robin Frijns	Virgin-Audi	1:10.063	—N/a	11
12	7	(Brazil) Sérgio Sette Câmara	Dragon-Penske	1:10.147	—N/a	12
13	13	(Portugal) António Félix da Costa	Techeetah-DS	1:10.156	—N/a	13
14	8	(United Kingdom) Oliver Turvey	NIO	1:10.181	—N/a	14
15	27	(United Kingdom) Jake Dennis	Andretti-BMW	1:10.239	—N/a	15
16	20	(New Zealand) Mitch Evans	Jaguar	1:10.526	—N/a	16
17	88	(United Kingdom) Tom Blomqvist	NIO	1:10.530	—N/a	17
18	17	(Netherlands) Nyck de Vries	Mercedes	1:10.581	—N/a	18
19	71	(France) Norman Nato	Venturi-Mercedes	1:10.658	—N/a	19
20	10	(United Kingdom) Sam Bird	Jaguar	1:10.934	—N/a	20
21	5	(Belgium) Stoffel Vandoorne	Mercedes	1:10.952	—N/a	21
22	6	(Sweden) Joel Eriksson	Dragon-Penske	1:11.036	—N/a	24^{1}
23	33	(Germany) René Rast	Audi	1:11.271	—N/a	22
24	48	(Switzerland) Edoardo Mortara	Venturi-Mercedes	1:11.690	—N/a	23

Notes:

- ^1 – Joel Eriksson received a 3-place grid penalty due to his power used being over the regulatory limit.

==== Race ====
Pos.	No.	Driver	Team	Laps	Time/Retired	Grid	Points
1	28	(Germany) Maximilian Günther	Andretti-BMW	38	46:24.747	4	25
2	25	(France) Jean-Éric Vergne	Techeetah-DS	38	+2.072	2	18
3	11	(Brazil) Lucas di Grassi	Audi	38	+2.832	7	15
4	37	(New Zealand) Nick Cassidy	Virgin-Audi	38	+4.623	1	12+3^{1}
5	4	(Netherlands) Robin Frijns	Virgin-Audi	38	+5.239	11	10
6	23	(Switzerland) Sébastien Buemi	e.dams-Nissan	38	+6.370	5	8+1^{2}
7	22	(United Kingdom) Oliver Rowland	e.dams-Nissan	38	+6.581	8	6
8	36	(Germany) André Lotterer	Porsche	38	+7.826	10	4
9	10	(United Kingdom) Sam Bird	Jaguar	38	+8.489	20	2+1^{3}
10	33	(Germany) René Rast	Audi	38	+11.917	22	1
11	94	(United Kingdom) Alex Lynn	Mahindra	38	+14.912	3	
12	13	(Portugal) António Félix da Costa	Techeetah-DS	38	+15.289	13	
13	17	(Netherlands) Nyck de Vries	Mercedes	38	+27.523	18	
14	48	(Switzerland) Edoardo Mortara	Venturi-Mercedes	38	+27.698	23	
15	71	(France) Norman Nato	Venturi-Mercedes	38	+28.472	19	
16	88	(United Kingdom) Tom Blomqvist	NIO	38	+28.746	17	
17	6	(Sweden) Joel Eriksson	Dragon-Penske	38	+41.106	24	
18	7	(Brazil) Sérgio Sette Câmara	Dragon-Penske	38	+49.849	12	
Ret	27	(United Kingdom) Jake Dennis	Andretti-BMW	30	Retired in pits	15	
Ret	29	(United Kingdom) Alexander Sims	Mahindra	29	Puncture	9	
Ret	5	(Belgium) Stoffel Vandoorne	Mercedes	27	Collision damage	21	
Ret	20	(New Zealand) Mitch Evans	Jaguar	14	Electrical	16	
Ret	8	(United Kingdom) Oliver Turvey	NIO	11	Collision damage	14	
Ret	99	(Germany) Pascal Wehrlein	Porsche	10	Collision damage	6	

Notes:

- ^1 – Pole position.
- ^2 – Fastest in group stage.
- ^3 – Fastest lap.

==== Standings after the race ====
Drivers' Championship standings

	Pos	Driver	Points
	1	(Switzerland) Edoardo Mortara	72
	2	(Netherlands) Robin Frijns	72
7	3	(France) Jean-Éric Vergne	68
	4	(Germany) René Rast	61
2	5	(Portugal) António Félix da Costa	60

Teams' Championship standings

	Pos	Constructor	Points
1	1	(China) Techeetah-DS	128
3	2	(United Kingdom) Virgin-Audi	124
1	3	(Germany) Audi	115
3	4	(Germany) Mercedes	113
2	5	(United Kingdom) Jaguar	112

- Notes: Only the top five positions are included for both sets of standings.

=== Race two ===
==== Qualifying ====
Group draw
Group 1	(Switzerland) MOR (1)	(Netherlands) FRI (2)	(France) JEV (3)	(Germany) RAS (4)	(Portugal) DAC (5)	(New Zealand) EVA (6)
Group 2	(Netherlands) DEV (7)	(United Kingdom) ROW (8)	(Brazil) DIG (9)	(Belgium) VAN (10)	(United Kingdom) DEN (11)	(Germany) GUE (12)
Group 3	(United Kingdom) BIR (13)	(New Zealand) CAS (14)	(Germany) WEH (15)	(United Kingdom) SIM (16)	(United Kingdom) LYN (17)	(Germany) LOT (19)
Group 4	(Switzerland) BUE (20)	(United Kingdom) TUR (21)	(Brazil) SET (22)	(France) NAT (23)	(United Kingdom) BLO (24)	(Sweden) ERI (25)

Pos.	No.	Driver	Team	GS	SP	Grid
1	10	(United Kingdom) Sam Bird	Jaguar	1:08.855	1:08.572	1
2	20	(New Zealand) Mitch Evans	Jaguar	1:08.914	1:08.662	2
3	37	(New Zealand) Nick Cassidy	Virgin-Audi	1:08.947	1:08.663	3
4	99	(Germany) Pascal Wehrlein	Porsche	1:08.898	1:08.818	4
5	7	(Brazil) Sérgio Sette Câmara	Dragon-Penske	1:09.038	1:08.988	5
6	36	(Germany) André Lotterer	Porsche	1:09.012	1:09.201	6
7	13	(Portugal) António Félix da Costa	Techeetah-DS	1:09.052	—N/a	7
8	94	(United Kingdom) Alex Lynn	Mahindra	1:09.166	—N/a	8
9	29	(United Kingdom) Alexander Sims	Mahindra	1:09.229	—N/a	9
10	71	(France) Norman Nato	Venturi-Mercedes	1:09.236	—N/a	10
11	33	(Germany) René Rast	Audi	1:09.256	—N/a	11
12	11	(Brazil) Lucas di Grassi	Audi	1:09.328	—N/a	12
13	23	(Switzerland) Sébastien Buemi	e.dams-Nissan	1:09.339	—N/a	13
14	48	(Switzerland) Edoardo Mortara	Venturi-Mercedes	1:09.393	—N/a	14
15	6	(Sweden) Joel Eriksson	Dragon-Penske	1:09.495	—N/a	15
16	22	(United Kingdom) Oliver Rowland	e.dams-Nissan	1:09.499	—N/a	16
17	8	(United Kingdom) Oliver Turvey	NIO	1:09.620	—N/a	17
18	88	(United Kingdom) Tom Blomqvist	NIO	1:09.649	—N/a	18
19	27	(United Kingdom) Jake Dennis	Andretti-BMW	1:09.969	—N/a	19
20	5	(Belgium) Stoffel Vandoorne	Mercedes	1:10.089	—N/a	20
21	4	(Netherlands) Robin Frijns	Virgin-Audi	1:10.341	—N/a	21
22	17	(Netherlands) Nyck de Vries	Mercedes	1:10.599	—N/a	22
23	28	(Germany) Maximilian Günther	Andretti-BMW	1:10.637	—N/a	23
24	25	(France) Jean-Éric Vergne	Techeetah-DS	1:21.673	—N/a	24

==== Race ====
Pos.	No.	Driver	Team	Laps	Time/Retired	Grid	Points
1	10	(United Kingdom) Sam Bird	Jaguar	37	46:15.909	1	25+3+1^{1}
2	37	(New Zealand) Nick Cassidy	Virgin-Audi	37	+4.167	3	18
3	13	(Portugal) António Félix da Costa	Techeetah-DS	37	+4.840	7	15+1^{2}
4	99	(Germany) Pascal Wehrlein	Porsche	37	+7.154	4	12
5	36	(Germany) André Lotterer	Porsche	37	+7.762	6	10
6	29	(United Kingdom) Alexander Sims	Mahindra	37	+16.286	9	8
7	71	(France) Norman Nato	Venturi-Mercedes	37	+24.983	10	6
8	4	(Netherlands) Robin Frijns	Virgin-Audi	37	+25.084	21	4
9	94	(United Kingdom) Alex Lynn	Mahindra	37	+25.405	8	2
10	28	(Germany) Maximilian Günther	Andretti-BMW	37	+26.009	23	1
11	7	(Brazil) Sérgio Sette Câmara	Dragon-Penske	37	+26.341	5	
12	5	(Belgium) Stoffel Vandoorne	Mercedes	37	+30.781	20	
13	20	(New Zealand) Mitch Evans	Jaguar	37	+30.957	2	
14	11	(Brazil) Lucas di Grassi	Audi	37	+31.970^{3}	12	
15	23	(Switzerland) Sébastien Buemi	e.dams-Nissan	37	+32.985	13	
16	27	(United Kingdom) Jake Dennis	Andretti-BMW	37	+35.692	19	
17	48	(Switzerland) Edoardo Mortara	Venturi-Mercedes	37	+35.924	14	
18	17	(Netherlands) Nyck de Vries	Mercedes	37	+36.339	22	
19	22	(United Kingdom) Oliver Rowland	e.dams-Nissan	37	+51.384^{4}	16	
20	33	(Germany) René Rast	Audi	37	+59.694	11	
21	88	(United Kingdom) Tom Blomqvist	NIO	37	+1:05.327	18	
22	6	(Sweden) Joel Eriksson	Dragon-Penske	37	+1:07.701	15	
Ret	8	(United Kingdom) Oliver Turvey	NIO	29	Collision damage	17	
Ret	25	(France) Jean-Éric Vergne	Techeetah-DS	0	Technical	24	

Notes:

- ^1 – Pole position; fastest in group stage.
- ^2 – Fastest lap.
- ^3 – Lucas di Grassi received a 10-second time penalty for causing a collision.
- ^4 – Oliver Rowland received a 5-second time penalty for causing a collision.

==== Standings after the race ====
Drivers' Championship standings

	Pos	Driver	Points
12	1	(United Kingdom) Sam Bird	81
3	2	(Portugal) António Félix da Costa	76
1	3	(Netherlands) Robin Frijns	76
3	4	(Switzerland) Edoardo Mortara	72
9	5	(New Zealand) Nick Cassidy	70

Teams' Championship standings

	Pos	Constructor	Points
1	1	(United Kingdom) Virgin-Audi	146
1	2	(China) Techeetah-DS	144
2	3	(United Kingdom) Jaguar Racing	141
1	4	(Germany) Audi	115
1	5	(Germany) Mercedes	113

- Notes: Only the top five positions are included for both sets of standings.

== Notes ==
Previous race: 2021 Puebla ePrix	FIA Formula E World Championship; 2020–21 season	Next race: 2021 London ePrix
Previous race: 2019 New York City ePrix	New York City ePrix	Next race: 2022 New York City ePrix
