= Kiro Race Co =

Anglo-American Formula E team

(United States) Cupra Kiro
- Founded: 2013 (as Team China Racing (NEXTEV))
- Base: Silverstone Park, United Kingdom
- Team principal(s): Russell O'Hagan
- Current series: Formula E
- Current drivers: (Spain) 3. Pepe Martí (United Kingdom) 33. Jake Hughes
- Noted drivers: (China) Ho Pin Tung (Spain) Antonio García (France) Charles Pic (United Kingdom) Oliver Turvey (Brazil) Nelson Piquet Jr (China) Ma Qinghua (Italy) Luca Filippi (France) Tom Dillmann (Germany) Daniel Abt (United Kingdom) Tom Blomqvist (Brazil) Sérgio Sette Câmara (Germany) David Beckmann (United Kingdom) Dan Ticktum
- Races: 165
- Wins: 4
- Podiums: 11
- Poles: 5
- Points: 589
- Drivers' Championships: FIA Formula E: 2014–15: Nelson Piquet Jr.
- First entry: 2014 Beijing ePrix
- Last entry: 2026 London ePrix
- First win: 2015 Long Beach ePrix
- Last win: 2026 Tokyo ePrix (R1)
- Website: https://www.kiroraceco.com/

Kiro Race Co, competing as CUPRA Kiro, is an American-owned, British-based motor racing team that currently competes in the FIA Formula E Championship, an all-electric racing series. The team was previously owned and managed by Chinese companies Lisheng Sports and Gusto Engineering respectively, before being acquired by The Forest Road Company, a Los Angeles-based investment firm.

The team, previously competing under the names China Racing, NEXTEV TCR, NEXTEV Nio, Nio Formula E Team, Nio 333 Racing, and Electric Racing Technologies (ERT) Formula E Team, has participated in the FIA Formula E World Championship since its inaugural season, winning the first Drivers' Championship with Nelson Piquet Jr.

== History ==
China Racing was the second team (behind the Drayson Racing project, which then transformed into Trulli GP) to announce its involvement in Formula E, back in March 2013.

=== 2014–15 season ===
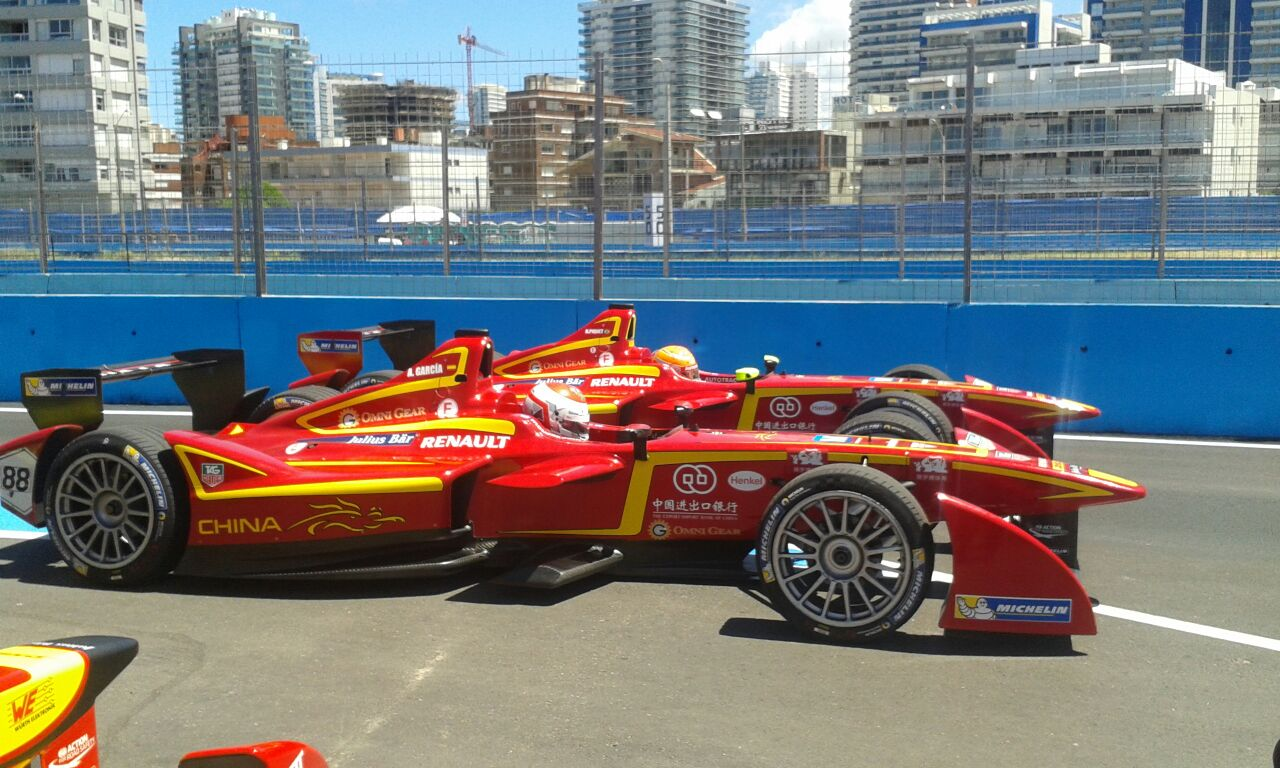
Antonio García (front) and Nelson Piquet Jr. (back) at the 2014 Punta del Este ePrix, running the original liveries.

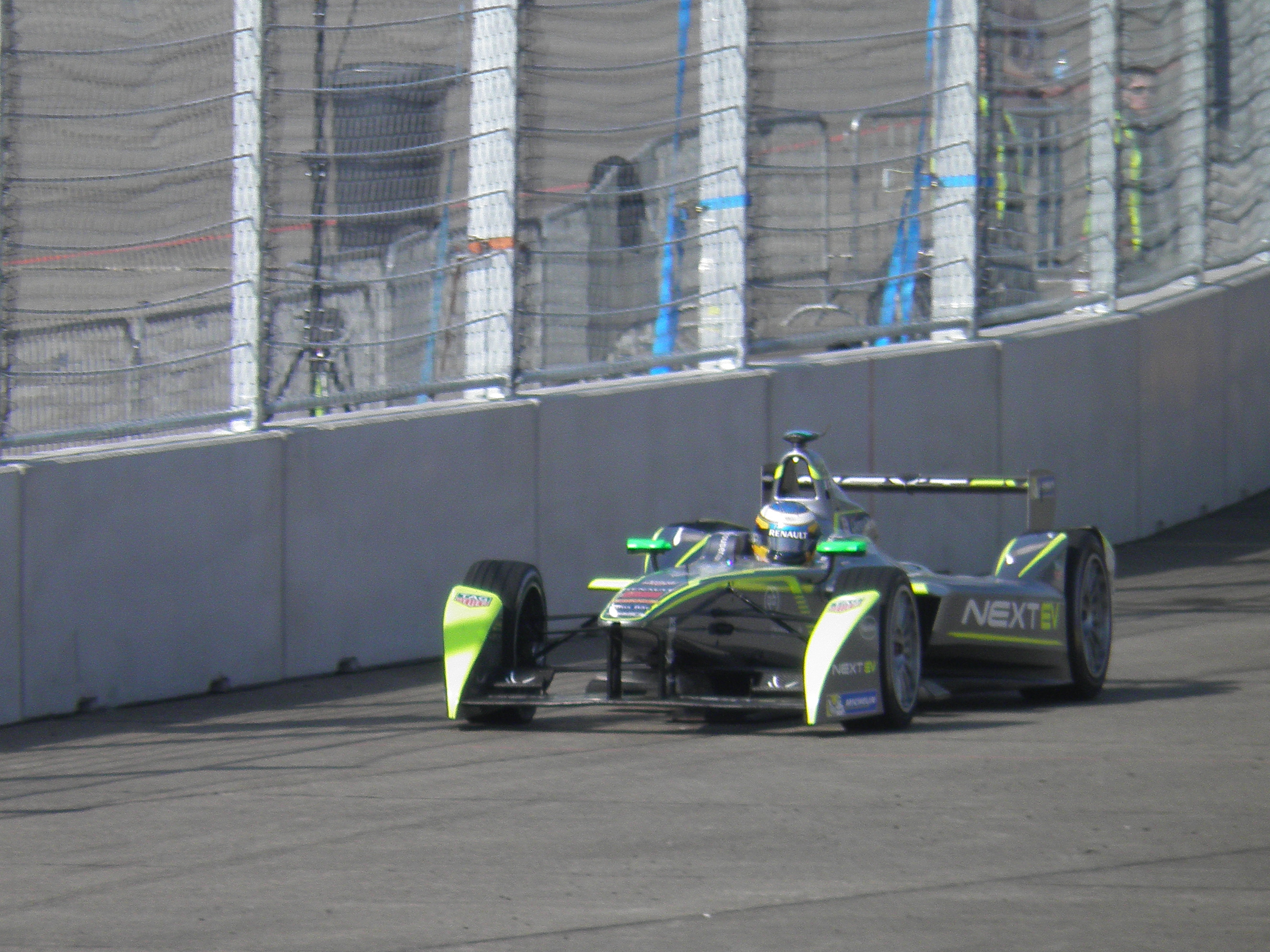
Charles Pic in his final Formula E appearance at the 2015 Berlin ePrix, running the redesigned 2015 livery.

China Racing announced Nelson Piquet Jr. and Ho-Pin Tung as their drivers for the inaugural season. Over the course of the season, the team used multiple drivers in car no. 88, with Tung taking part in three rounds, Antonio García in two rounds, Charles Pic in four rounds, before ultimately picking Oliver Turvey for the final double-header weekend in London. Piquet, on the other hand, completed the full season and managed to win the championship in the final race of the season.In 2015, the China Racing name and branding had phased out. For the Long Beach ePrix, the team introduced radical changes to their livery, removing the red and yellow which had been previously associated with the team and replacing it with NEXTEV branding. The move was finalised in the following round in Monaco, which the team entered as NEXTEV TCR instead of China Racing.

Despite Piquet winning the championship, NEXTEV TCR only finished fourth in the Teams' Championship, as his teammates only added 8 points, the team scoring 152 points in total.

=== 2015–16 season ===
NEXTEV TCR chose to develop their own powertrain for the second season and began testing it in the summer of 2015. The team also confirmed Piquet, who was signed on a multi-year deal. Turvey was later confirmed as Piquet's teammate for the season. In 2016, NEXTEV acquired the whole team, which, at the time, was still partially owned by Team China Racing (hence the 'TCR' part in its name).

The 2015–16 season was a disappointment for the team. Piquet and Turvey only scored 19 points in total, falling down to ninth place in the Teams' Championship, only ahead of Trulli, who withdrew from the championship in its early stages. Turvey scored the team's best season result with a sixth place at the first round in Beijing.

=== 2016–17 season ===
Piquet and Turvey were retained for the 2016–17 season. The team, previously operated by Campos Racing, was set to form its own operational and engineering team, led by Gerry Hughes. A new branding, NEXTEV Nio, was introduced for the season.

While the team's performance was an improvement over the previous season, it was still unable to compete for either of the Drivers' and Teams' Championships, despite setting pole positions in Hong Kong (with Piquet) and Mexico City (with Turvey). NEXTEV Nio would finish sixth with 59 points.

=== 2017–18 season ===
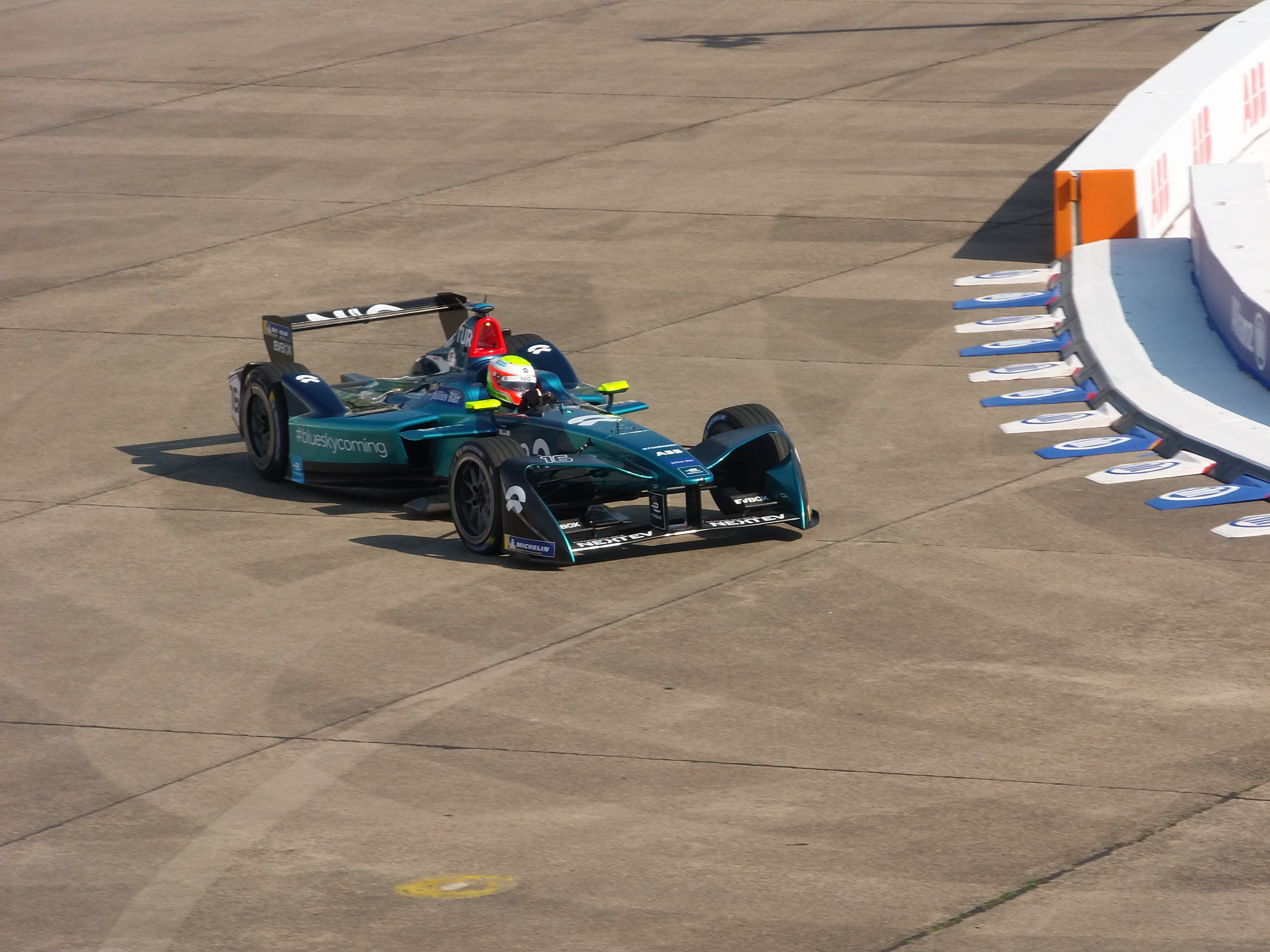
Oliver Turvey driving the NextEV NIO Sport 003 at the 2018 Berlin ePrix.

Piquet left the team after a performance clause allowed him to exit the team for Jaguar. Luca Filippi was announced as his replacement, while Turvey stayed with the team. Ma Qinghua joined the team as a reserve driver. During the season, he subbed for Filippi in Paris and Turvey in New York, who was forced to withdraw from the double-header after a hand injury. The NextEV brand was slowly phasing out as the team now competed under the name Nio Formula E Team. The NextEV brand stayed in the name of the powertrain.

Nio cemented their position at the back of the grid and only finished eighth in Teams' Championship with 47 points. Turvey, however, managed a podium spot with a second-place finish in Mexico City.

=== 2018–19 season ===
Tom Dillmann and Oliver Turvey were announced as the driver pairing for the 2018–19 season, meaning Turvey would compete for the team for a fourth straight full season. The NextEV brand remained on the car, but the powertrain only featured Nio in its name.

The season would prove to be another disappointment as the team only accumulated 7 points over the course of the season, all of them with Turvey, placing them last (eleventh) in the Teams' Championship.

=== 2019–20 season ===
The team underwent a change in ownership and is currently managed by Lisheng Sports and Gusto Engineering. On 10 September 2019, the definitive entry list was revealed, in which the team was listed under the name Nio 333 Formula E Team. The team will not be using its own powertrains and it instead acquired last year's powertrain from GEOX Dragon. Nio, however, kept their manufacturer status due to their new powertrain being homologated as such by the FIA in late August. Ma Qinghua also joined the team on a permanent basis, racing alongside the team mainstay Turvey. Qinghua, however, was unable to participate in the 2020 Berlin ePrix due to Chinese travel restrictions, and was replaced by Daniel Abt.

=== 2020–21 season ===
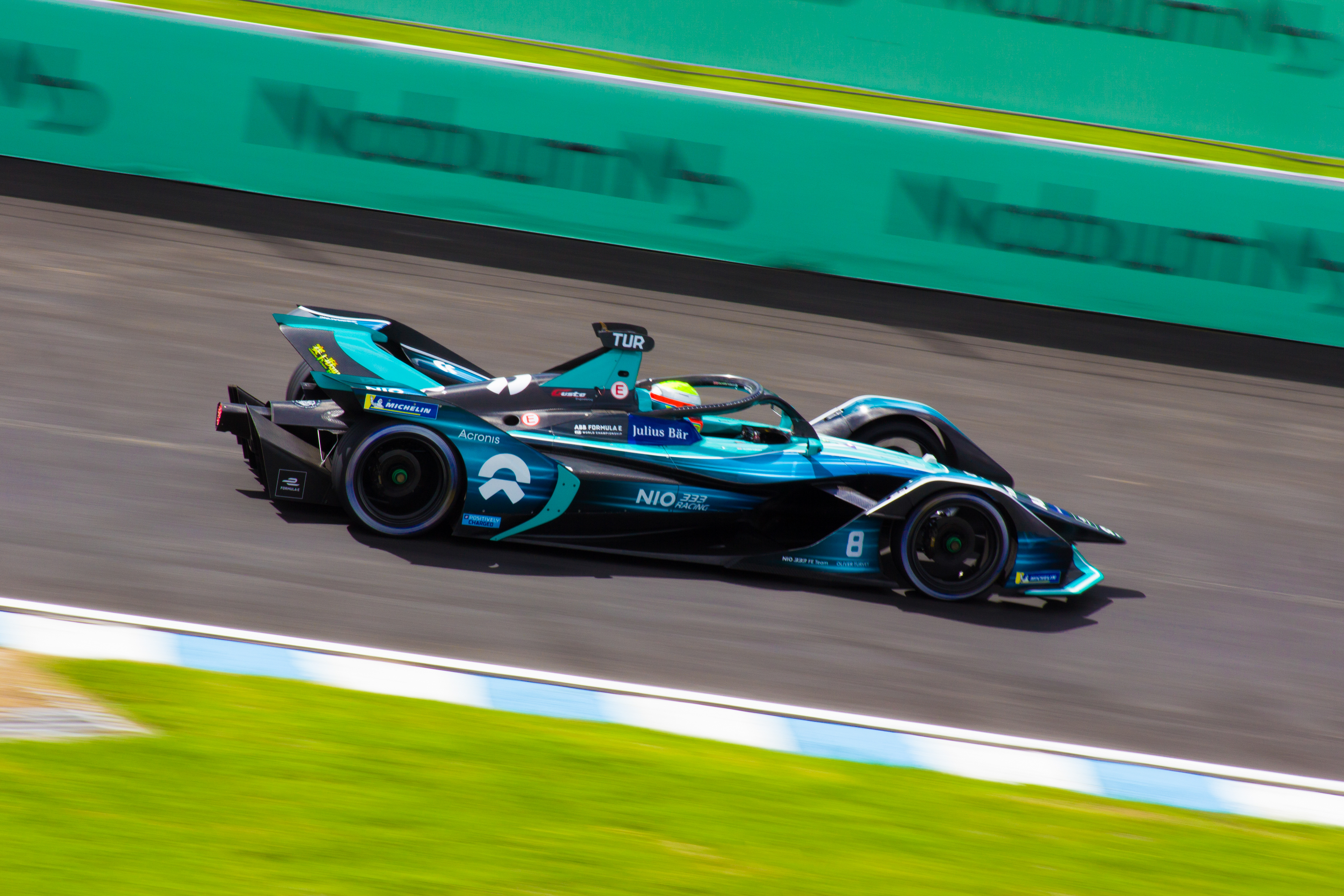
Turvey driving the NIO 333 001 at the 2021 Puebla ePrix.

Tom Blomqvist joined Nio 333 for the 2020–21 season to partner Turvey. In February 2021, Adam Carroll was announced as the reserve driver. The team scored points for the first time since the 2019 New York City ePrix after Turvey secured two points finishes at the Diriyah ePrix double-header. Blomqvist achieved the same feat at the following Rome ePrix double-header.

=== 2021–22 season ===
Turvey was retained by the team while Blomqvist departed and was replaced by Carlin Formula 2 driver and former Williams Driver Academy member Dan Ticktum. The team scored their first points of the season in the second race of the Rome ePrix, where Turvey finished 7th and Ticktum finished 10th, which was his first points finish in Formula E.

=== 2022–23 season ===
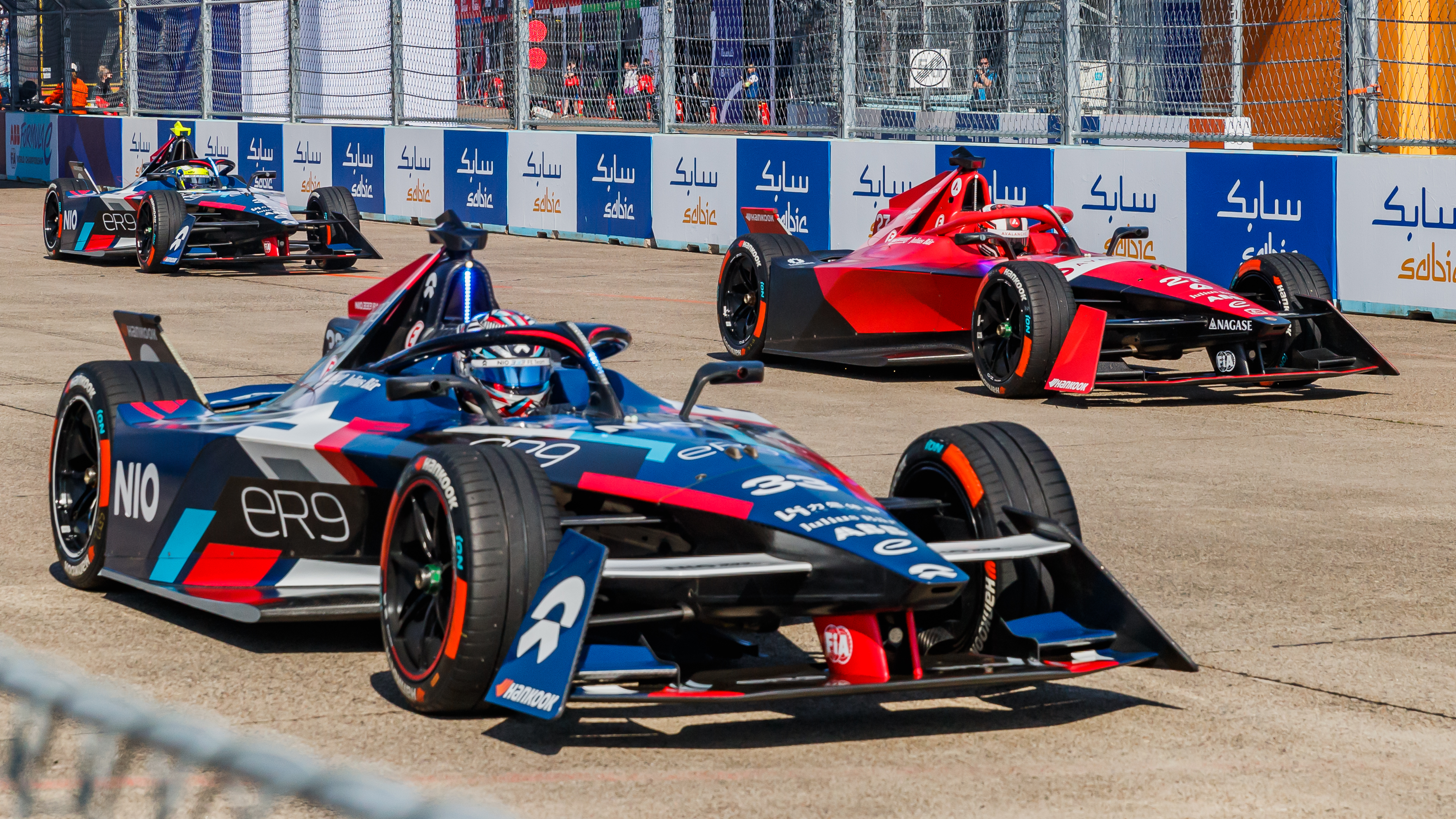
Ticktum and Sette Câmara at the 2023 Berlin ePrix

Turvey was released from the team to join DS Penske as a reserve driver. He was replaced by Sérgio Sette Câmara, who partnered with Ticktum.

=== 2023–24 season ===
ERT Formula E logo

Ahead of pre-season testing, it was announced that the team would rebrand into ERT Formula E Team, with the Nio name leaving the team.

=== 2024–25 season ===
The team was rebranded again as Kiro Race Co ahead of the season. Acquired by The Forest Road Company, the team will race under an American license. The team has ceased to develop their own powertrain, becoming a customer team of Porsche utilising the old 2023–24 powertrain. The newly rebranded team tested Ticktum alongside David Beckmann at the Madrid test. Both drivers were confirmed as the full driver lineup, while Sette Câmara was released after two seasons with the team. This was also the last driver lineup to be announced and was done so the week of the São Paulo ePrix . Ahead of the São Paulo ePrix weekend, the team partnered with Cupra to enter the season as Cupra Kiro. During the season, F1 Academy graduate Bianca Bustamante was signed as a development driver. She participated in the 2024–25 season rookie test for the team, finishing in 19th and 22nd in the morning and afternoon sessions, respectively.Ticktum won the 2025 Jakarta ePrix, his first victory in Formula E and the team's first win since 2015.

=== 2025–26 season ===
In October 2025, Cupra Kiro announced that Dan Ticktum would continue with the team, with Pepe Martí replacing David Beckmann to join the Formula E grid from Formula 2.

After crashing out of the season-opening São Paulo ePrix, Martí scored the team's first points of the campaign in Mexico City, with Ticktum taking consecutive pole positions in Monaco. Also at Monaco, Martí secured the first podium of his Formula E career, becoming the first Spanish racing driver to finish on the Formula E podium and just the fifth Spaniard to finish on a World Championship single-seater podium, following in the footsteps of Alfonso de Portago, Fernando Alonso, Pedro de la Rosa, and Carlos Sainz Jr..Martí returned to the podium at the Sanya ePrix, with Ticktum taking the second win of his Formula E career at the Tokyo ePrix.

Cupra Kiro finished the season with 128 points and eighth in the Teams' Championship, completing its most successful season to date. Martí ended the season as the top performing rookie in 13th in the Drivers' Championship with 66 points while Ticktum was 15th with 62 points.

=== 2026–27 season ===
In September 2026, Cupra Kiro announced that Martí would continue with the team for a second season. On 12 October 2026 Cupra Kiro announced that Jake Hughes would partner Martí, with the former McLaren and Maserati MSG Racing driver replacing Ticktum.

== Results ==
| Year | Chassis | Powertrain | Tyres | No. | Drivers | 1 | 2 | 3 | 4 | 5 | 6 | 7 | 8 | 9 | 10 | 11 | 12 | 13 | 14 | 15 | 16 | 17 | Points | T.C. |
China Racing / NEXTEV TCR^{1}
| 2014–15 | Spark SRT01-e | SRT01-e^{2} | M | | | BEI | PUT | PDE | BUE | MIA | LBH | MCO | BER | MSC | LDN | | | | | | | | 152 | 4th |
| 2014–15 | Spark SRT01-e | SRT01-e^{2} | M | 88 | (China) Ho-Pin Tung | 16 | 11 | | 11 | | | | | | | | | | | | | | 152 | 4th |
| 2014–15 | Spark SRT01-e | SRT01-e^{2} | M | 88 | (Spain) Antonio García | | | 11 | | | | | | 19 | | | | | | | | | 152 | 4th |
| 2014–15 | Spark SRT01-e | SRT01-e^{2} | M | 88 | (France) Charles Pic | | | | | 17 | 16 | 8 | 15 | | | | | | | | | | 152 | 4th |
| 2014–15 | Spark SRT01-e | SRT01-e^{2} | M | 88 | (United Kingdom) Oliver Turvey | | | | | | | | | | 9 | 9 | | | | | | | 152 | 4th |
| 2014–15 | Spark SRT01-e | SRT01-e^{2} | M | 99 | (Brazil) Nelson Piquet Jr. | 8 | Ret | 2 | 3 | 5 | 1 | 3 | 4 | 1 | 5 | 7 | | | | | | | 152 | 4th |
| 2015–16 | Spark SRT01-e | NEXTEV TCR FormulaE 001 | M | | | BEI | PUT | PDE | BUE | MEX | LBH | PAR | BER | LDN | | | | | | | | | 19 | 9th |
| 2015–16 | Spark SRT01-e | NEXTEV TCR FormulaE 001 | M | 1 | (Brazil) Nelson Piquet Jr. | 15† | 8 | 15† | 12 | 13 | Ret | Ret | 13 | 12 | 9 | | | | | | | | 19 | 9th |
| 2015–16 | Spark SRT01-e | NEXTEV TCR FormulaE 001 | M | 88 | (United Kingdom) Oliver Turvey | 6 | Ret | 12 | 9 | 11 | 12 | 13 | 12 | 15† | 10 | | | | | | | | 19 | 9th |
(China) NEXTEV Nio
| 2016–17 | Spark SRT01-e | NEXTEV FormulaE 002 | M | | | HKG | MRK | BUE | MEX | MCO | PAR | BER | | NYC | | MTL | | | | | | | 59 | 6th |
| 2016–17 | Spark SRT01-e | NEXTEV FormulaE 002 | M | 3 | (Brazil) Nelson Piquet Jr. | 11 | 16 | 5 | 9 | 4 | 7 | 12 | 12 | 11 | 16 | 13 | 16 | | | | | | 59 | 6th |
| 2016–17 | Spark SRT01-e | NEXTEV FormulaE 002 | M | 88 | (United Kingdom) Oliver Turvey | 8 | 7 | 9 | Ret | 13 | 12 | 10 | 9 | 6 | 14 | 15 | 17 | | | | | | 59 | 6th |
(United Kingdom) Nio Formula E Team
| 2017–18 | Spark SRT01-e | NextEV Nio Sport 003 | M | | | HKG | | MRK | SCL | MEX | PDE | RME | PAR | BER | ZUR | NYC | | | | | | | 47 | 8th |
| 2017–18 | Spark SRT01-e | NextEV Nio Sport 003 | M | 16 | (United Kingdom) Oliver Turvey | 16 | 6 | Ret | 16 | 2 | 7 | 12 | 7 | 5 | 9 | DNS | | | | | | | 47 | 8th |
| 2017–18 | Spark SRT01-e | NextEV Nio Sport 003 | M | 16 | (China) Ma Qinghua | | | | | | | | | | | | 13 | | | | | | 47 | 8th |
| 2017–18 | Spark SRT01-e | NextEV Nio Sport 003 | M | 68 | (Italy) Luca Filippi | 10 | Ret | 16 | 12 | 14 | 13 | 13 | | 17 | Ret | 15 | Ret | | | | | | 47 | 8th |
| 2017–18 | Spark SRT01-e | NextEV Nio Sport 003 | M | 68 | (China) Ma Qinghua | | | | | | | | 17 | | | | | | | | | | 47 | 8th |
| 2018–19 | Spark SRT05e | Nio Sport 004 | M | | | ADR | MRK | SCL | MEX | HKG | SYX | RME | PAR | MCO | BER | BRN | NYC | | | | | | 7 | 11th |
| 2018–19 | Spark SRT05e | Nio Sport 004 | M | 8 | (France) Tom Dillmann | 14 | 17 | Ret | 15 | 12 | 12 | 15 | Ret | 14 | 19 | 16 | Ret | 14 | | | | | 7 | 11th |
| 2018–19 | Spark SRT05e | Nio Sport 004 | M | 16 | (United Kingdom) Oliver Turvey | 13 | 16 | 8 | 12 | 9 | 11 | 13 | 14 | Ret | 18 | 15 | 10 | 13 | | | | | 7 | 11th |
(China) Nio 333 FE Team
| 2019–20 | Spark SRT05e | Nio FE-005^{3} | M | | | DIR | | SCL | MEX | MRK | BER | | BER | | BER | | | | | | | | 0 | 12th |
| 2019–20 | Spark SRT05e | Nio FE-005^{3} | M | 3 | (United Kingdom) Oliver Turvey | 15 | DSQ | 11 | 13 | 21 | 16 | 18 | 16 | 22 | 19 | 21 | | | | | | | 0 | 12th |
| 2019–20 | Spark SRT05e | Nio FE-005^{3} | M | 33 | (China) Ma Qinghua | 20 | 19 | 16 | Ret | 23 | | | | | | | | | | | | | 0 | 12th |
| 2019–20 | Spark SRT05e | Nio FE-005^{3} | M | 33 | (Germany) Daniel Abt | | | | | | 18 | 16 | 15 | 18 | Ret | 20 | | | | | | | 0 | 12th |
| 2020–21 | Spark SRT05e | Nio 333 001 | M | | | DIR | | RME | | VLC | | MCO | PUE | | NYC | | LDN | | BER | | | | 19 | 12th |
| 2020–21 | Spark SRT05e | Nio 333 001 | M | 8 | (United Kingdom) Oliver Turvey | 10 | 6 | DNS | 14 | NC | 8 | 19 | 11 | Ret | Ret | Ret | 15 | 14 | 19 | 19 | | | 19 | 12th |
| 2020–21 | Spark SRT05e | Nio 333 001 | M | 88 | (United Kingdom) Tom Blomqvist | 18 | 18 | 10 | 8 | NC | 17 | 14 | 13 | Ret | 16 | 21 | NC | 19 | NC | 10 | | | 19 | 12th |
| 2021–22 | Spark SRT05e | Nio 333 001 | M | | | DRH | | MEX | RME | | MCO | BER | | JAK | MRK | NYC | | LDN | | SEO | | | 7 | 10th |
| 2021–22 | Spark SRT05e | Nio 333 001 | M | 3 | (United Kingdom) Oliver Turvey | 19 | 18 | 14 | 17 | 7 | 14 | 16 | 17 | 12 | 17 | 15 | 16 | 15 | 14 | Ret | 15 | | 7 | 10th |
| 2021–22 | Spark SRT05e | Nio 333 001 | M | 33 | (United Kingdom) Dan Ticktum | 18 | 19 | 18 | 18 | 10 | 12 | 19 | 19 | 20 | 18 | 17 | 12 | 17 | Ret | Ret | Ret | | 7 | 10th |
| 2022–23 | Formula E Gen3 | NIO 333 ER9 | H | | | MEX | DIR | | HYD | CPT | SPL | BER | | MCO | JAK | | PRT | RME | | LDN | | | 42 | 9th |
| 2022–23 | Formula E Gen3 | NIO 333 ER9 | H | 3 | (Brazil) Sérgio Sette Câmara | 16 | 15 | 17 | 5 | 12 | 16 | 16 | 15 | 14 | 17 | DNS | 16 | 8 | 16 | DSQ | 13 | | 42 | 9th |
| 2022–23 | Formula E Gen3 | NIO 333 ER9 | H | 33 | (United Kingdom) Dan Ticktum | 17 | 14 | 10 | Ret | 6 | 17 | Ret | 10 | 6 | 13 | 11 | 13 | 13 | 9 | 7 | 9 | | 42 | 9th |
(China) ERT Formula E Team
| 2023–24 | Formula E Gen3 | ERT X24 | H | | | MEX | DIR | | SAP | TOK | MIS | | MCO | BER | | SHA | | POR | | LDN | | | 23 | 11th |
| 2023–24 | Formula E Gen3 | ERT X24 | H | 3 | (Brazil) Sérgio Sette Câmara | DNS | 9 | 18 | DSQ | 10 | 15 | 6 | 19 | 16 | 13 | 13 | 18 | 14 | 14 | 12 | 11 | | 23 | 11th |
| 2023–24 | Formula E Gen3 | ERT X24 | H | 33 | (United Kingdom) Dan Ticktum | 18 | 21 | Ret | 16 | 18 | 4 | 14 | 13 | 14 | 17 | 20 | 21 | 17 | 15 | 13 | 14 | | 23 | 11th |
(United States) Cupra Kiro
| 2024–25 | Formula E Gen3 Evo | Porsche 99X Electric WCG3 | H | | | SAP | MEX | JED | | MIA | MCO | | TOK | | SHA | | JAK | BER | | LDN | | | 86 | 10th |
| 2024–25 | Formula E Gen3 Evo | Porsche 99X Electric WCG3 | H | 3 | (Germany) David Beckmann | NC | Ret | 14 | 17 | NC | 15 | 19 | 18 | 13 | 14 | 20 | 16 | Ret | 16 | 12 | 10 | | 86 | 10th |
| 2024–25 | Formula E Gen3 Evo | Porsche 99X Electric WCG3 | H | 33 | (United Kingdom) Dan Ticktum | 8 | 16 | 18 | 9 | 7 | 7 | 15 | 5 | 3 | 4 | 16 | 1 | 9 | 14 | Ret | 14 | | 86 | 10th |
| 2025–26 | Formula E Gen3 Evo | Porsche 99X Electric WCG3 | H | | | SAP | MEX | MIA | JED | | MAD | BER | | MCO | | SYX | SHA | | TOK | | LDN | | 128 | 8th |
| 2025–26 | Formula E Gen3 Evo | Porsche 99X Electric WCG3 | H | 3 | (Spain) Pepe Martí | Ret | 7 | 9 | 14 | 6 | 9 | 7 | 12 | 3 | Ret | 2 | 14 | 12 | 8 | Ret | Ret | 8 | 128 | 8th |
| 2025–26 | Formula E Gen3 Evo | Porsche 99X Electric WCG3 | H | 33 | (United Kingdom) Dan Ticktum | Ret | Ret | Ret | 12 | 5 | 4 | 20† | 14 | 12 | 14 | 15 | 13 | 11 | 1 | 11 | 6 | 16 | 128 | 8th |

Notes

- ^1 – The team's official name was changed to NEXTEV TCR prior to the 2015 Monaco ePrix.
- ^2 – In the inaugural season, all teams were supplied with a spec powertrain by McLaren.
- ^3 – The powertrain is a rebadged Penske EV-3 used by GEOX Dragon in the 2018–19 season.
- † – Driver did not finish the race, but was classified as they completed over 90% of the race distance.
