= Brooklyn Street Circuit =

FIA Grade 3 Racing Track

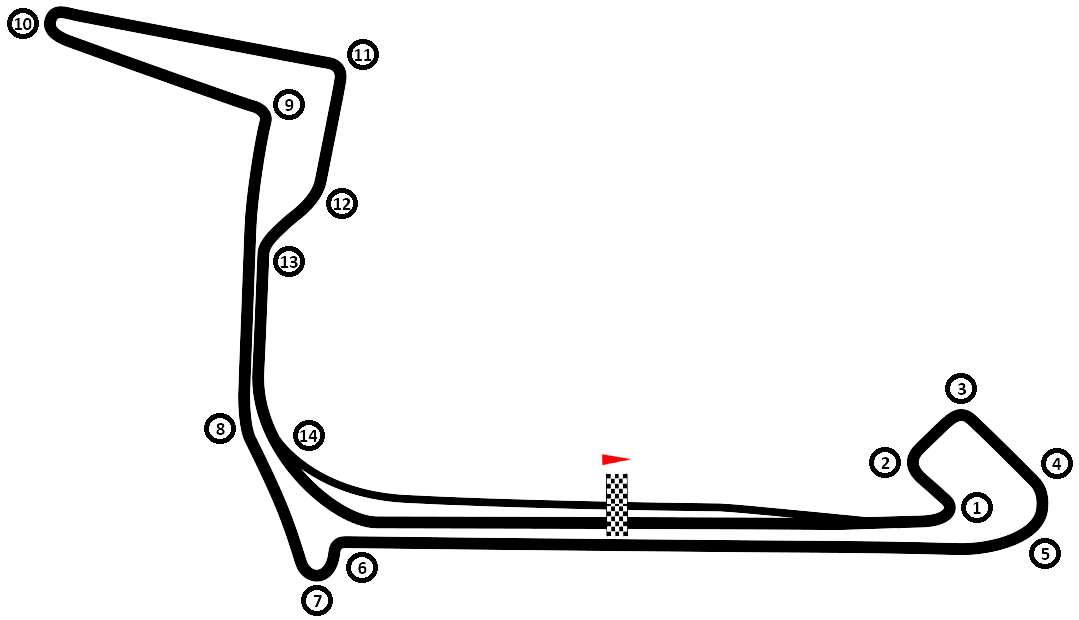
- Formula E Circuit (2021–2022)
- Location: Red Hook, Brooklyn, New York, USA
- Coordinates: 40°40′53″N 74°00′56″W
- FIA Grade: 3E
- Opened: 15 July 2017; 9 years ago
- Closed: 17 July 2022; 4 years ago
- Major events: Former; Formula E New York ePrix (2017–2019, 2021–2022); Jaguar I-Pace eTrophy (2019)

Formula E Circuit (2021–2022)
- Length: 2.320 km (1.442 mi)
- Turns: 14
- Race lap record: 1:10.050 ( (New Zealand) Mitch Evans, Jaguar I-Type 5, 2021, F-E)

Formula E Circuit (2018–2019)
- Length: 2.374 km (1.475 mi)
- Turns: 14
- Race lap record: 1:11.305 ( (Germany) Daniel Abt, Audi e-tron FE05, 2019, F-E)

Formula E Circuit (2017)
- Length: 1.953 km (1.214 mi)
- Turns: 13
- Race lap record: 1:03.883 ( (Germany) Maro Engel, Venturi VM200-FE-02, 2017, F-E)

The Brooklyn Street Circuit was a street circuit in the Red Hook neighborhood of the New York City borough of Brooklyn, adjacent to the Brooklyn Cruise Terminal along Brooklyn's western coast. It was created for the New York City ePrix of the single-seater, electrically powered Formula E championship. Its first use was during the 2016–17 Formula E season when it hosted the 2017 New York City ePrix.

Following the last known CART PPG Cup races in the New York metropolitan area in the 1980s, there have been several failed attempts to establish a race in or near New York City for a major automobile series. In September 2016, New York City and Fédération Internationale de l'Automobile (FIA) officials announced the establishment of a 2017 event in the city for Formula E, with the Red Hook location selected over other potential sites including Central Park. The race was approved due to the absence of air pollution and noise disturbances from the electric-powered race cars, compared to normal gasoline-powered racing automobiles. The inaugural New York City ePrix events were held on July 15−16, 2017, with Sam Bird of DS Virgin Racing winning both races.

== Description ==
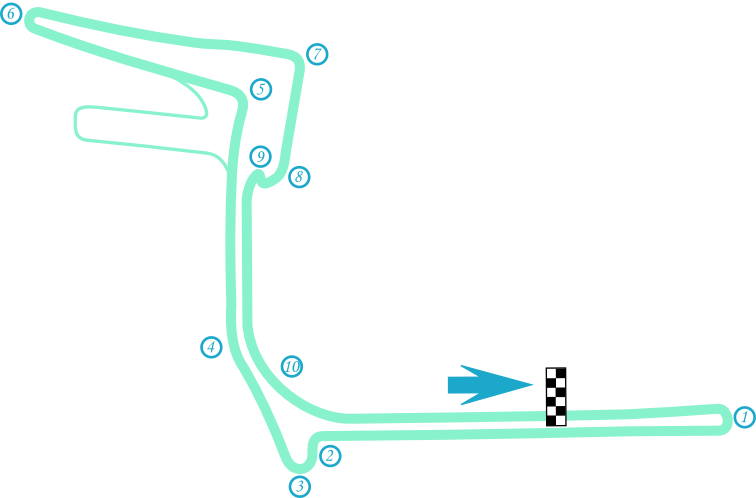
The old 2017 layout of the circuit, with the hairpin at turn 1

The course was situated at the west end of the Red Hook neighborhood in western Brooklyn, adjacent to the Brooklyn Cruise Terminal and the Atlantic Basin, the small body of water within the Upper New York Bay served by the terminal. The site was bound by the east-to-west portion of Bowne Street, the Red Hook Container Terminal, and the Brooklyn–Battery Tunnel to the north, and by Wolcott Street to the south. Imlay Street and Conover Street mark the east end of the site, with Van Brunt Street (the primary thoroughfare of Red Hook) one block east.

The original configuration of the circuit measured 1.220 mi (1.963 km) in length and consisted of 13 corners. The course predominantly follows the existing layout of the streets and parking areas of the terminal, separated from the rest of the street plan of Red Hook. The main and second straights utilize the north-south stretch of Bowne Street (which turns south after entering the terminal area), adjacent to Pier 11 of the terminal. Curving west, the track then parallels Clinton Wharf towards the Buttermilk Channel coastline. The track offers views of the Lower Manhattan skyline and the Statue of Liberty. Prior to its inaugural running, driver Felix Rosenqvist described the track as "one of those really technical circuits" comparable to the Circuit des Invalides on the streets of Paris.

For the 2018 race, the circuit was lengthened to 1.475 mi (2.374 km), extending the course farther north and west to Summit Street and Hamilton Avenue. As opposed to the original right-hand hairpin at the end of the main straight on Bowne Street, a four-turn complex was added featuring a lefthander and three right-handed turns leading to the second straight. The changes were made to accommodate the second generation Formula E car, introduced in the 2018–19 season to replace the Spark-Renault SRT 01E. The new cars have increased downforce and power.

=== Entrances and amenities ===
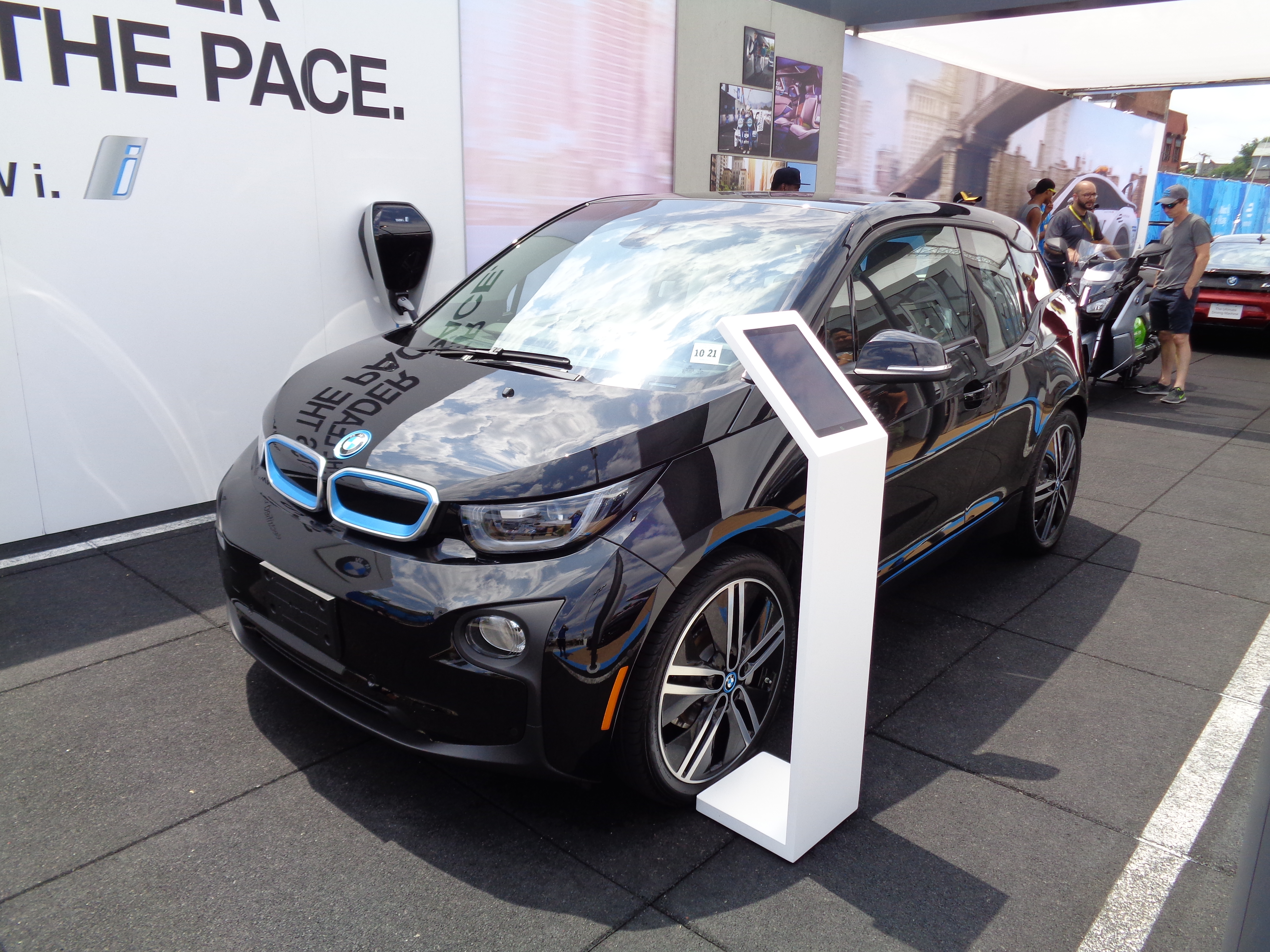
A BMW i3 electric car on display in the eVillage at the 2017 ePrix.

The Brooklyn Street Circuit features two grandstands. Grandstand 1 is located on the main straight in front of Pier 11 of the ship terminal, just to the west of the start-finish line, providing a view of the starting grid. The smaller Grandstand 2 is just to the west, also adjacent to Pier 11, in front of the turn leading to the main straight. According to Formula E CEO Alejandro Agag, the organizers were "quite cautions" in designing the seating area. Various pedestrian overpass bridges are set up around the circuit to cross the track. Like at other Formula E events, the Brooklyn Street Circuit features an eVillage entertainment area. It features displays of technological innovations and electric- and hybrid-powered production vehicles, racing simulators, and it hosts a driver autograph session prior to the race. Food and drinks are available from stands and local food trucks located within the event.

The original 2017 layout featured three entrances to the track. Entrance 1 (e1) is located at Ferris Street and King Street near the paddock and podium areas. Entrance 2 (e2) is located adjacent to the NYC Ferry landing of the cruise terminal, leading to the grandstands. Entrance 3 (e3) was located on Pioneer Street near Van Brunt Street, leading directly to the eVillage. An overpass bridge led from this entrance to the grandstands. For the 2018 event, entrance 3 was moved one block north to Verona Street. Two additional entrances were added. The first (e4) is located at Imlay Street and Bowne Street near the new turn complex. The second (e5) is located at Brooklyn Cruise Terminal Pier 12. The former eVillage area near entrance 3 will instead be used for race suites and an accreditation center. The new eVillage will be located behind grandstand 1 and around the new turn complex near entrance 4.

== History ==
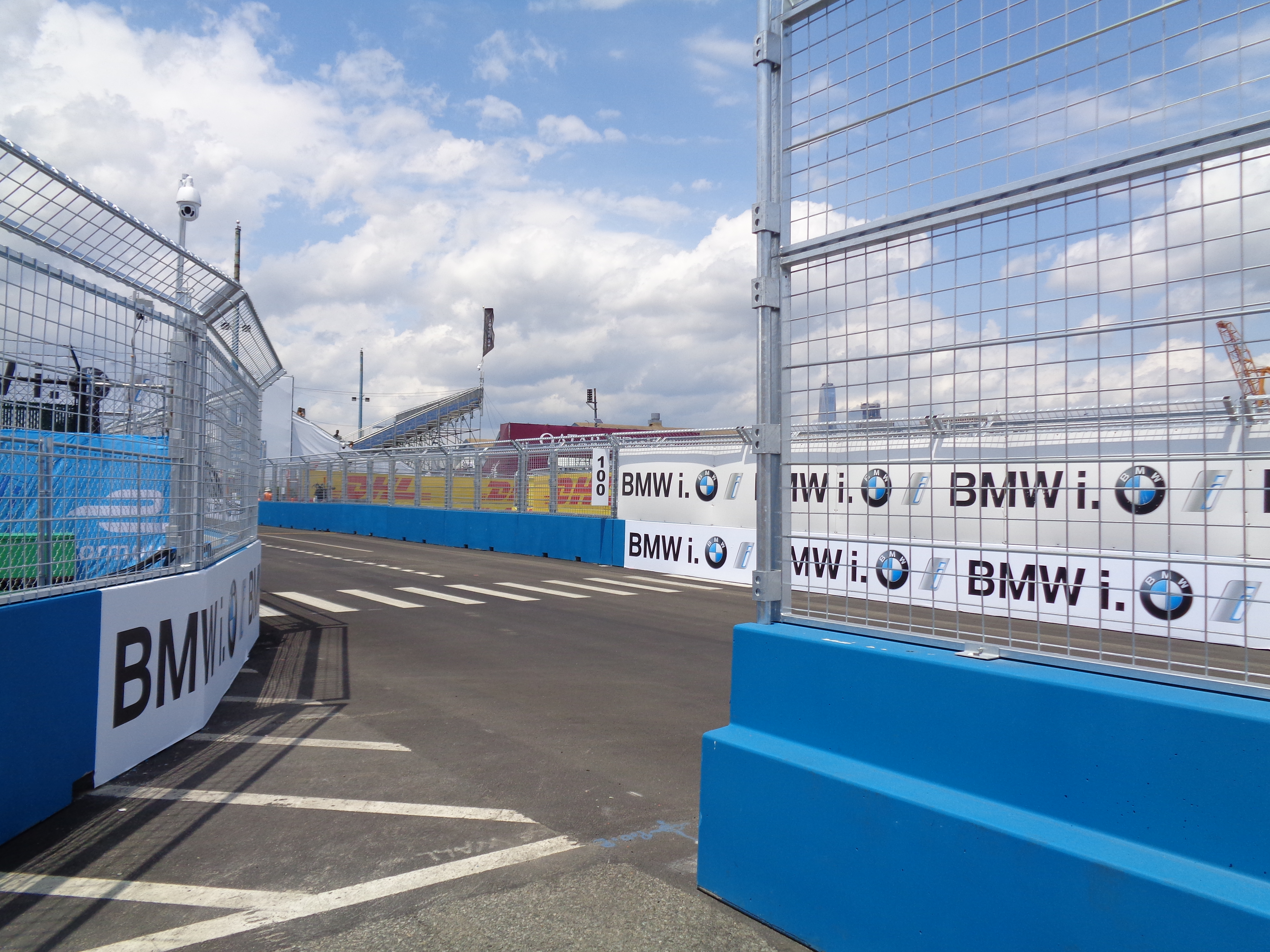
View of the circuit in 2017.

=== Previous races in the New York area ===
One of the earliest known automobile races in New York City was in 1896, when six cars competed in a race between the city and Westchester County, New York. In 1904, William Kissam Vanderbilt II began hosting the Vanderbilt Cup, held on a 25-mile (40 km) circuit of local dirt roads in Nassau County, Long Island. In 1908 Vanderbilt began construction on the Long Island Motor Parkway (also known as the Vanderbilt Parkway), a paved and grade separated limited-access highway between Queens and Nassau County, to host the race beginning that year. The course only used a section of the parkway located in Nassau County between Westbury and Hicksville. Following a crash in the 1910 Vanderbilt Cup, the New York State Legislature banned all automobile racing outside of self-contained circuits. The parkway remained open to normal passenger traffic as a toll road until 1938, and was largely replaced by the free Northern State Parkway and Grand Central Parkway. The Vanderbilt Cup was later held at Roosevelt Raceway (now a horse racing course) in Westbury, Nassau County in 1936 and 1937.

A NASCAR Grand National Series race was held at Linden Airport in Linden, New Jersey in 1954. In June 1956 Wall Stadium in Wall Township, New Jersey hosted a race for NASCAR's Convertible Division, with Glen Wood of Wood Brothers Racing participating. In July 1958 the track held a race for the Grand National Series. To this day, Wall Stadium is a popular Modified stop for various Northeastern-based touring series, including the Whelen Modified Tour, NASCAR's popular touring series in the Northeast, and forms the core for their local racing program, which has featured legendary engineer Ray Evernham and premiership champion Martin Truex Jr. as drivers who have raced on local cards, which is most notable for Turkey Derby held in late November since 1974.

The Vanderbilt Cup was revived as a Formula Junior event in 1960 at Roosevelt Raceway. In 1965, 1967 and 1968 the Bridgehampton Sports Car Races, held at Bridgehampton Race Circuit located in Suffolk County in eastern Long Island, were billed as the Vanderbilt Cup.

For many years afterwards, attempts have been made to establish an event for a major auto racing series within the New York metropolitan area, including Formula One, NASCAR, and IndyCar. In 1975 and again in 1983, a racing circuit to host a Formula One Grand Prix event was proposed for the New York City area. Potential sites included Flushing Meadows–Corona Park in the borough of Queens, and the Meadowlands Sports Complex in New Jersey. The Flushing Meadows plans were opposed by the local community and environmental groups, and the race was postponed and ultimately cancelled by 1985. The Meadowlands site would host the Meadowlands Grand Prix Champ Car event in 1984.

Beginning in 2003, a NASCAR track called Liberty Speedway was planned, with potential sites at the Meadowlands and Linden in New Jersey, and Bloomfield in western Staten Island. In December 2004, the International Speedway Corporation (owned by NASCAR) and The Related Companies purchased the 675-acre (273 ha) Staten Island site. At the time the planned 80,000-seat track was the largest proposed sports venue in the city, with greater potential seating capacity than the proposed West Side Stadium or the future Barclays Center. After protests from environment groups over pollution and the loss of wetlands in the area, and from local residents over potential traffic congestion and parking issues, in 2006 NASCAR cancelled plans for the track.

In July 2012, New York State Assembly candidate Paul Saryian proposed reviving the plans for the Staten Island track as part of a potential bid for the 2024 Summer Olympics. Around 2012, Formula One again planned to hold the Grand Prix of America on the proposed Port Imperial Street Circuit in New Jersey, but by 2014, the plan had fallen through. In 2015, NASCAR was seriously considering buying stock in order to build a track in New York City.

Existing NASCAR Cup Series tracks in close proximity to New York City include Watkins Glen International in upstate New York, Pocono Raceway in Pennsylvania, and Dover International Speedway in Dover, Delaware. Watkins Glen also held Formula One events from 1961 to 1980. New Jersey Motorsports Park, which has held races for the ARCA Racing Series and the NASCAR K&N Pro Series East (a developmental NASCAR series), is located in southern New Jersey. The now-defunct Nazareth Speedway, located in eastern Pennsylvania, hosted the IndyCar Firestone Indy 225 event, and NASCAR Busch Series (now Xfinity Series) and Truck Series events until its closure in 2004. The Meadowlands site has also hosted domestic motorcycle racing; the American Flat Track championship runs on the Meadowlands Racetrack, as their series often runs during off-season for horse racing at notable horse tracks.

=== New York City ePrix ===
In March 2014, it was announced that Formula E was working with New York City authorities to bring a motor race to the area. On September 21, 2016, Fédération Internationale de l'Automobile (FIA) President Jean Todt, Formula E CEO Alejandro Agag, and New York City government officials announced that the New York City ePrix would be held in July 2017 at the Brooklyn Cruise Terminal in Red Hook, with a track layout presented. Government officials approved the ePrix only because, as an electric race, it would not create noise or air pollution. Originally, planners considered Governors Island, Central Park, and Liberty State Park in Jersey City as possible locations for the track. However, these sites were not chosen since a Governors Island track would have been too costly; a Central Park track would have required demolishing trees; and Liberty State Park was outside the city limits.

In June 2017, NYC-based McLaren Engineering Group (unrelated to the racing team) and D’Onofrio General Contractors Corp were contracted to create the circuit within the terminal. Construction of the track began on July 2, thirteen days before the first race. Much of the project involved erecting both temporary and permanent structures for the race, while existing infrastructure such as signs and curbing had to be removed or redesigned to facilitate the race course. The temporary infrastructure of a typical Formula E street circuit includes track barriers and curbs, grandstands, pedestrian overpass bridges, and electronic cables for television broadcasting and race scoring. After the end of the event, this equipment is transported to the next location. In the case of the Brooklyn Street Circuit, most of the materials were locally acquired, with only the fencing for the track provided by Formula E. Permanent structures built for the Brooklyn circuit included the cruise terminal's guardhouse, which was originally situated in the middle of the proposed circuit. It was rebuilt in order to be portable so it could be moved prior to the event, and then reinstalled into its normal location after the event. Much of the area was repaved for the event as well. A ribbon-cutting ceremony was held on July 12, 2017, upon the arrival of the race cars.

The first race of the inaugural event was held on July 15, 2017, won by Sam Bird of DS Virgin Racing. Bird won the second race of the weekend on July 16, after which the track was taken apart. For the 2018 event, the track was lengthened and reconfigured.

== Access and transportation ==
The B61 bus route runs one block east of the circuit along Van Brunt Street, between Downtown Brooklyn and Park Slope/Windsor Terrace. The closest New York City Subway stations are the Carroll Street and Smith–Ninth Streets on the IND Culver Line (F and G trains) along Smith Street. The B61 connects with the Smith–Ninth Streets station. On race days, shuttle buses operate to the race track from the Carroll Street station, and from the Atlantic Avenue–Barclays Center station complex in Downtown Brooklyn. The circuit is also close to the NYC Ferry stops at Red Hook and Brooklyn Bridge Park Pier 6. The Red Hook ferry landing is located at entrance 2 adjacent to the track.

== Lap records ==
The fastest official race lap records at the Brooklyn Street Circuit are listed as:

Category	Time	Driver	Vehicle	Event	Circuit Map
Formula E Circuit (2021–2022): 2.320 km (1.442 mi)
Formula E	1:10.050	Mitch Evans	Jaguar I-Type 5	2021 New York City ePrix	
Formula E Circuit (2018–2019): 2.374 km (1.475 mi)
Formula E	1:11.305	Daniel Abt	Audi e-tron FE05	2019 New York City ePrix	
Jaguar I-Pace eTrophy	1:29.155	Sérgio Jimenez	Jaguar I-Pace eTrophy car	2019 2nd New York City Jaguar I-Pace eTrophy round	
Formula E Circuit (2017): 1.953 km (1.214 mi)
Formula E	1:03.883	Maro Engel	Venturi VM200-FE-02	2017 New York City ePrix	
