= 2025–26 Formula E World Championship =

Motorsport racing series

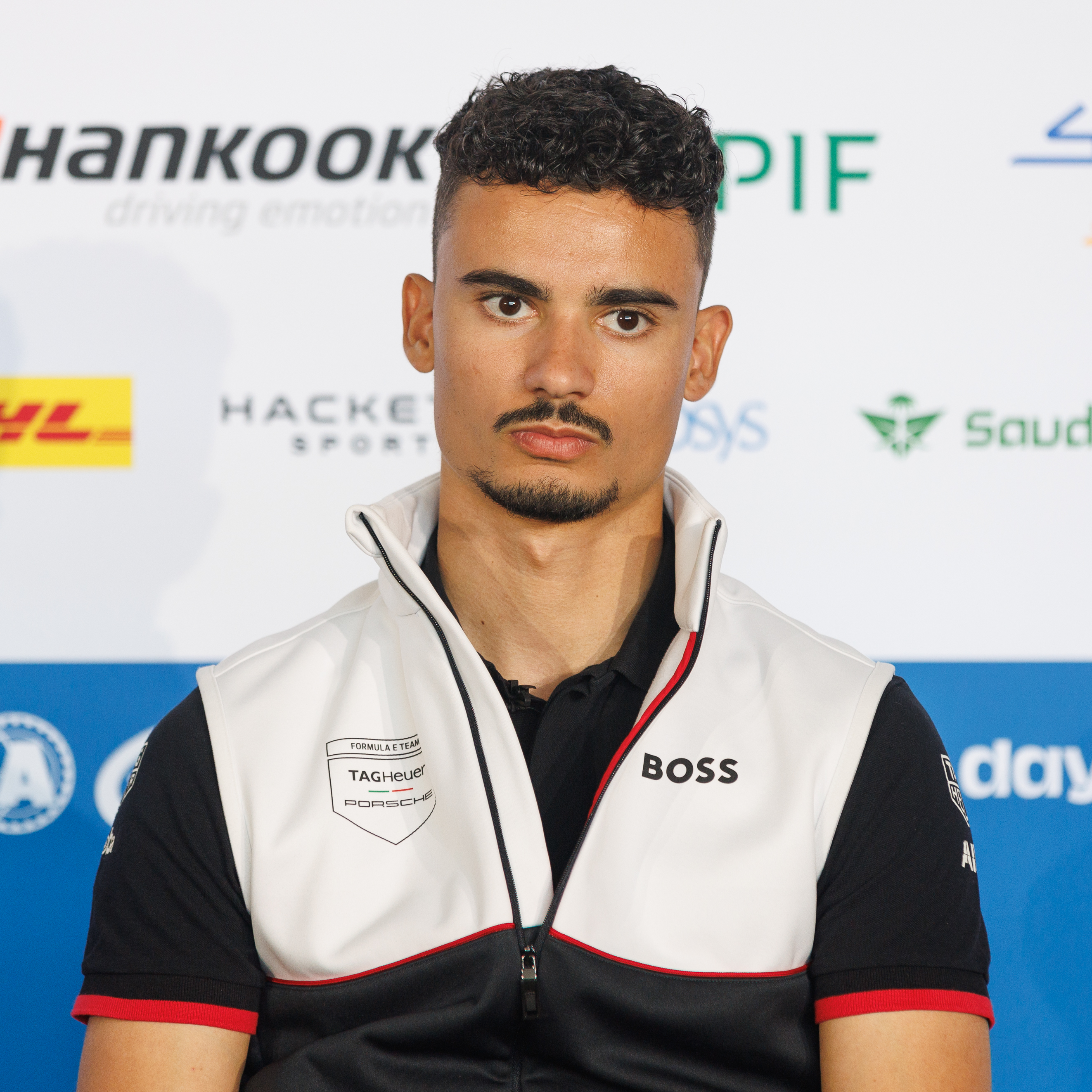
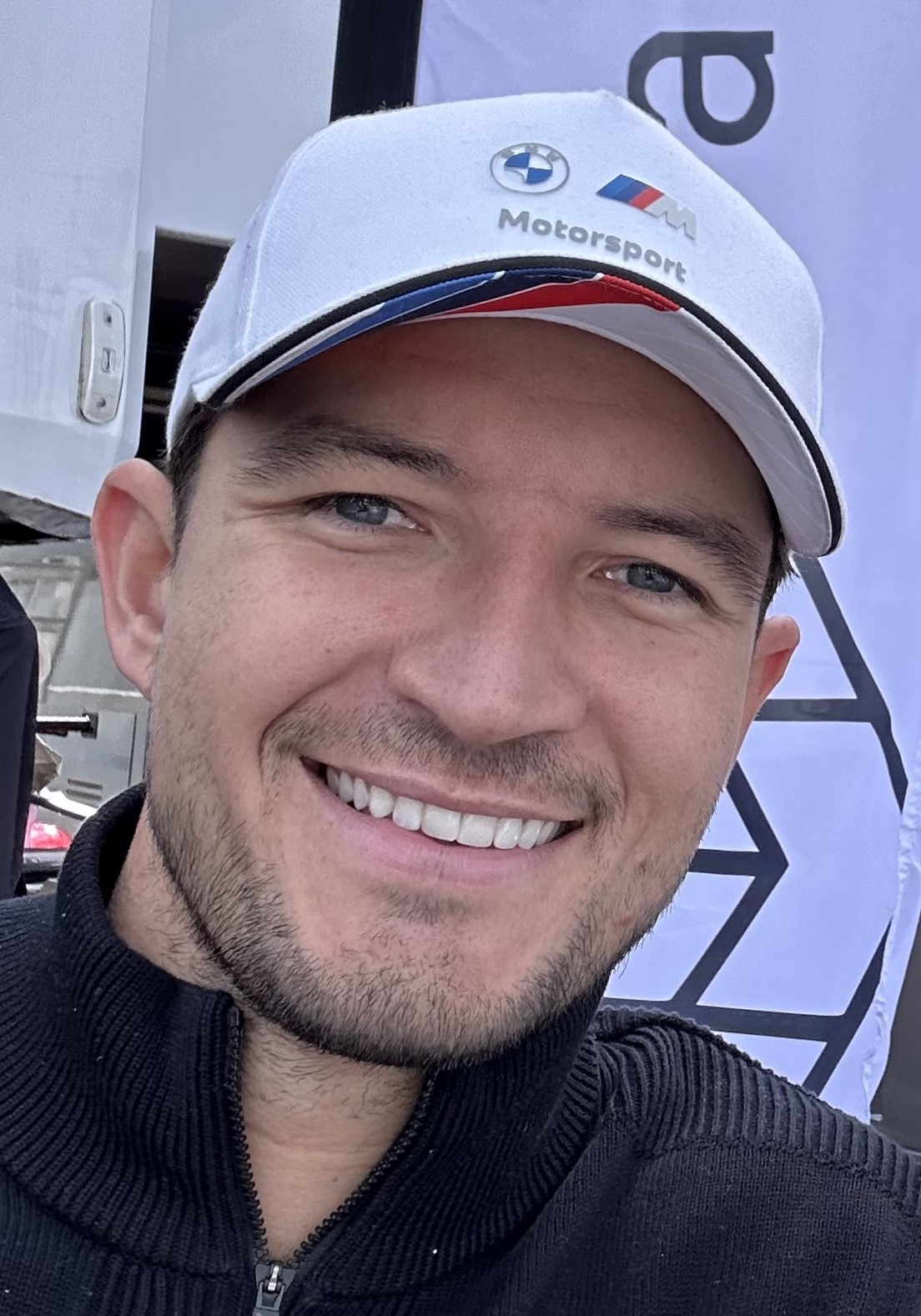
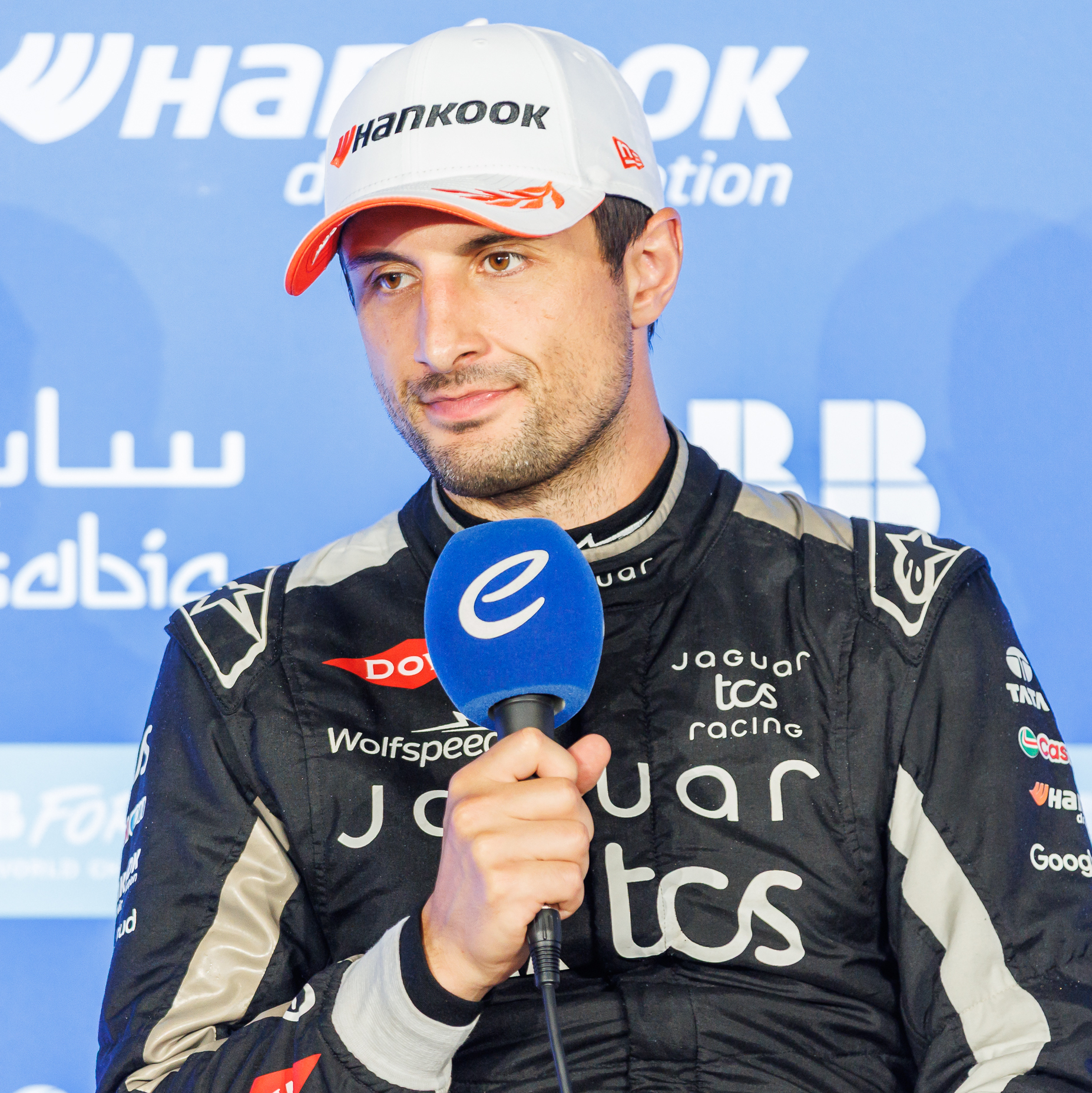
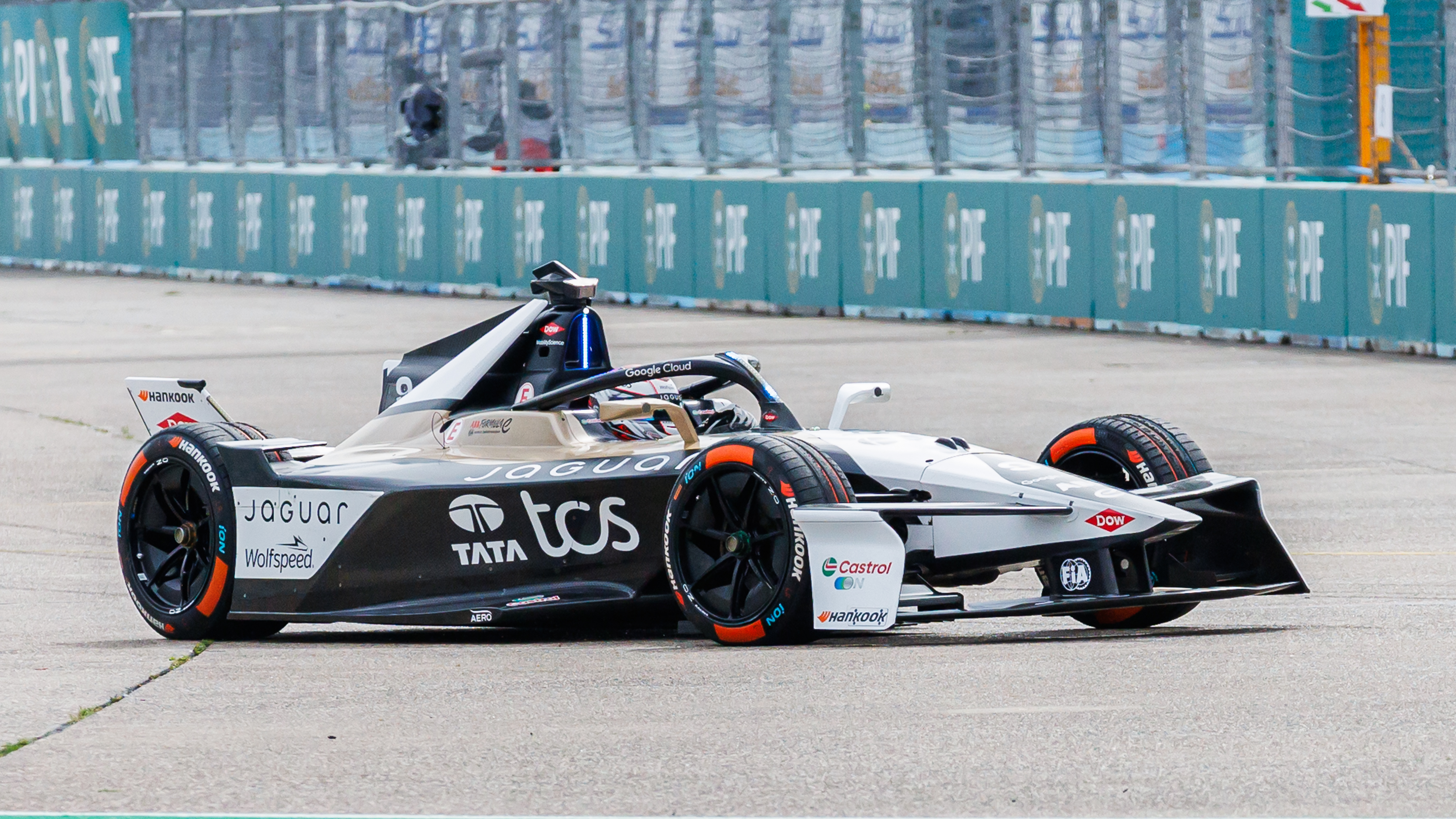
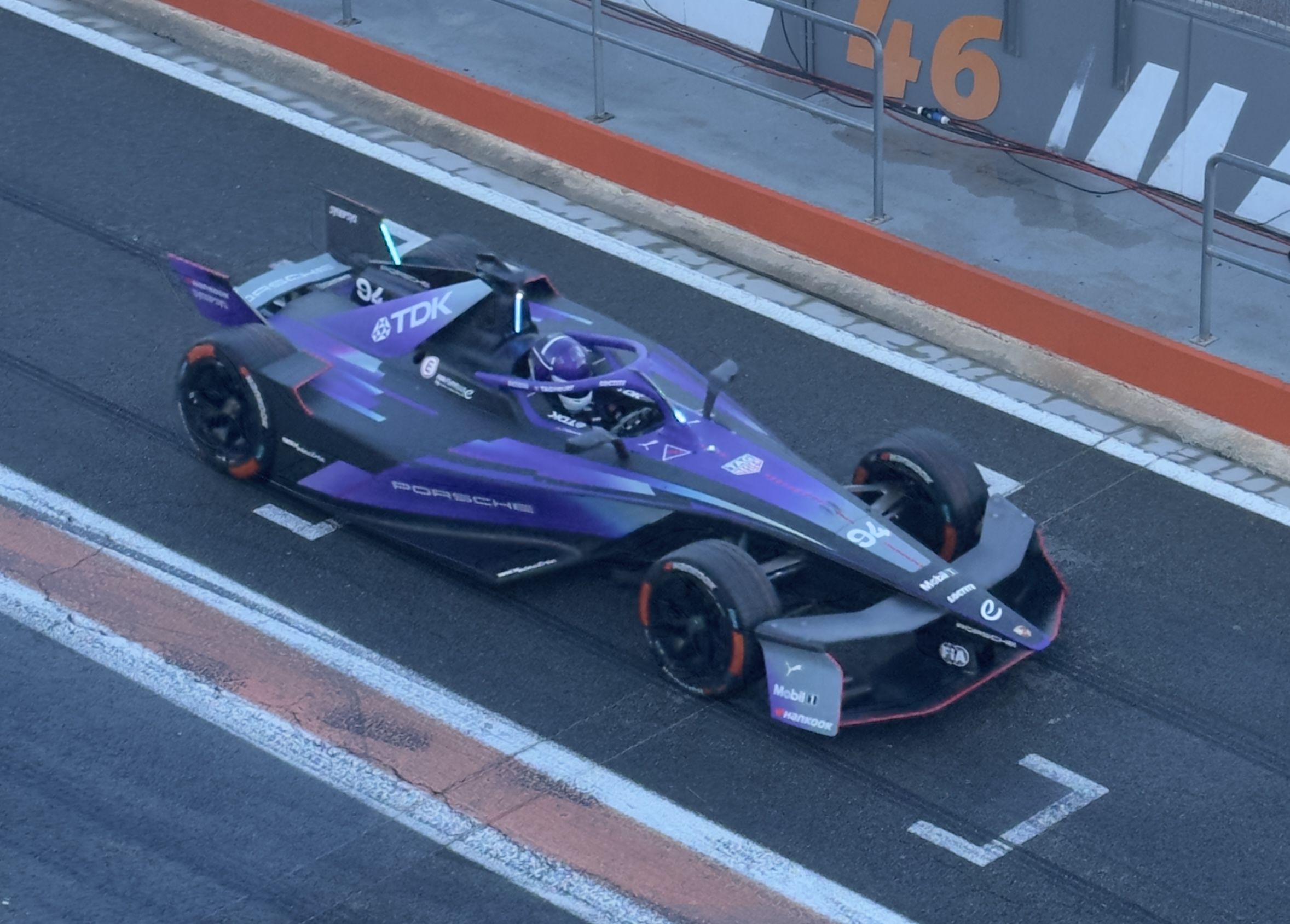
Pascal Wehrlein (top) won his second Drivers' Championship. Jake Dennis (middle left) ended the season as runner-up, while Mitch Evans (middle right) finished third. Jaguar TCS Racing (bottom left) won the Teams' standings. Porsche (bottom right) won the Manufacturers' Championship.

The 2025–26 ABB FIA Formula E World Championship was the twelfth season of the FIA Formula E championship, a motor racing championship for electrically powered vehicles recognised by motorsport's governing body, the Fédération Internationale de l'Automobile (FIA), as the highest class of competition for electric open-wheel racing cars. It began in December 2025 and ended in August 2026.

It was the fourth and final season of the Formula E Gen3, with the Gen4 regulations coming into effect the following season.

Pascal Wehrlein, who had won the Drivers' Championship in 2023–24, became the second ever two-time Formula E champion, a feat that only Jean-Éric Vergne had achieved before. Wehrlein, driving for Porsche, was crowned champion after the final race in London, while rivals Jaguar TCS Racing won the Teams' Championship. Porsche defended their Manufacturer's Championship title with two races to spare.

== Teams and drivers ==
All teams used the Formula E Gen3 Evo car on Hankook tyres.

| Team | Powertrain | No. | Drivers | Rounds |
|---|---|---|---|---|
| (Japan) Nissan Formula E Team | Nissan e-4ORCE 05 | 1 | (United Kingdom) Oliver Rowland | All |
| (Japan) Nissan Formula E Team | Nissan e-4ORCE 05 | 23 | (France) Norman Nato | All |
| (United States) Cupra Kiro | Porsche 99X Electric WCG3 | 3 | (Spain) Pepe Martí | All |
| (United States) Cupra Kiro | Porsche 99X Electric WCG3 | 33 | (United Kingdom) Dan Ticktum | All |
| (United States) DS Penske | DS E-Tense FE25 | 7 | (Germany) Maximilian Günther | All |
| (United States) DS Penske | DS E-Tense FE25 | 77 | (United Kingdom) Taylor Barnard | All |
| (United Kingdom) Jaguar TCS Racing | Jaguar I-Type 7 | 9 | (New Zealand) Mitch Evans | All |
| (United Kingdom) Jaguar TCS Racing | Jaguar I-Type 7 | 13 | (Portugal) António Félix da Costa | All |
| (United Kingdom) Lola Yamaha ABT Formula E Team | Lola-Yamaha T001 | 11 | (Brazil) Lucas di Grassi | All |
| (United Kingdom) Lola Yamaha ABT Formula E Team | Lola-Yamaha T001 | 22 | (Barbados) Zane Maloney | All |
| (United Kingdom) Envision Racing | Jaguar I-Type 7 | 14 | (Sweden) Joel Eriksson | All |
| (United Kingdom) Envision Racing | Jaguar I-Type 7 | 16 | (Switzerland) Sébastien Buemi | All |
| (India) Mahindra Racing | Mahindra M12Electro | 21 | (Netherlands) Nyck de Vries | All |
| (India) Mahindra Racing | Mahindra M12Electro | 48 | (Switzerland) Edoardo Mortara | All |
| (France) Citroën Racing | Citroën ë-CX (Note: The Citroën powertrain is a rebadged DS E-Tense FE25, contributing points towards Stellantis' total in the Manufacturers' Standings.) | 25 | (France) Jean-Éric Vergne | All |
| (France) Citroën Racing | Citroën ë-CX | 37 | (New Zealand) Nick Cassidy | All |
| (United States) Andretti Formula E | Porsche 99X Electric | 27 | (United Kingdom) Jake Dennis | All |
| (United States) Andretti Formula E | Porsche 99X Electric | 28 | (Brazil) Felipe Drugovich | All |
| (Germany) Porsche Formula E Team | Porsche 99X Electric | 51 | (Switzerland) Nico Müller | All |
| (Germany) Porsche Formula E Team | Porsche 99X Electric | 94 | (Germany) Pascal Wehrlein | All |

=== Team changes ===
After three years of competing in the series, McLaren announced in April 2025 that the McLaren Formula E Team would not return to the championship for the 2025–26 season to focus on its LMDh project in the World Endurance Championship. The team did not find a buyer and shut down, leaving Nissan without a customer team for the first time since the 2021–22 season.

Citroën announced they would be joining Formula E in the 2025–26 season, as Stellantis replaced Maserati MSG Racing, which had competed in the series for 3 years, with the Citroën brand. This marked the marque's debut in top-level single-seater racing.

TAG Heuer ended their partnership with Porsche after being their title sponsor for six seasons.

=== Driver changes ===
Envision Racing and Robin Frijns parted ways at the end of the 2024–25 season following six seasons together across two spells, with Frijns focusing on his FIA WEC Hypercar program with BMW M Team WRT. To replace Frijns, the team signed Jaguar's reserve driver Joel Eriksson, who entered ten Formula E races in 2021 and 2024, for his full-season debut.

Departing team McLaren saw Sam Bird not returning to race in the series after having taken part in every season since the championship's inauguration, instead taking up a reserve driver role at Nissan. Taylor Barnard moved to DS Penske, replacing Jean-Éric Vergne, who ended his affiliation with the DS Automobiles brand after eight seasons. Vergne moved over to newly entered Stellantis sister brand Citroën, where he was joined by season eleven runner-up Nick Cassidy, who departed Jaguar TCS Racing after two seasons with the team. This saw former champion Stoffel Vandoorne leave Maserati MSG Racing to become Jaguar's reserve driver on a multi-year deal with the outfit, whilst Jake Hughes became Mahindra's reserve driver and competed full-time in the European Le Mans Series LMP2 Class with Algarve Pro Racing.

António Félix da Costa departed the Porsche Formula E Team after three seasons as he moved to Jaguar TCS Racing to replace Citroën-bound Cassidy. The team signed Nico Müller, who departed Andretti after a single season with the American team where he finished 15th in the standings. To replace Müller, Andretti signed 2022 Formula 2 Champion Felipe Drugovich for his full-season debut after he made a one-round appearance in the 2024–25 season with Mahindra Racing.

David Beckmann left Cupra Kiro after a season with the team and returned to reserve driver duties at Porsche. He was replaced by former Red Bull junior driver Pepe Martí, who graduated from Formula 2, where he drove for Campos Racing.

== Calendar ==
The official calendar was released on 16 October 2025. It was the longest season in championship history, consisting of a record 17 races.

| Round | E-Prix | Country | Circuit | Date |
|---|---|---|---|---|
| 1 | São Paulo ePrix | Brazil | São Paulo Street Circuit | 6 December 2025 |
| 2 | Mexico City ePrix | Mexico | Autódromo Hermanos Rodríguez | 10 January 2026 |
| 3 | Miami ePrix | United States | Miami International Autodrome | 31 January 2026 |
| 4 | Jeddah ePrix | Saudi Arabia | Jeddah Corniche Circuit | 13 February 2026 |
| 5 | Jeddah ePrix | Saudi Arabia | Jeddah Corniche Circuit | 14 February 2026 |
| 6 | Madrid ePrix | Spain | Circuito del Jarama | 21 March 2026 |
| 7 | Berlin ePrix | Germany | Tempelhof Airport Street Circuit | 2 May 2026 |
| 8 | Berlin ePrix | Germany | Tempelhof Airport Street Circuit | 3 May 2026 |
| 9 | Monaco ePrix | Monaco | Circuit de Monaco | 16 May 2026 |
| 10 | Monaco ePrix | Monaco | Circuit de Monaco | 17 May 2026 |
| 11 | Sanya ePrix | China | Sanya Street Circuit | 20 June 2026 |
| 12 | Shanghai ePrix | China | Shanghai International Circuit | 4 July 2026 |
| 13 | Shanghai ePrix | China | Shanghai International Circuit | 5 July 2026 |
| 14 | Tokyo ePrix | Japan | Tokyo Street Circuit | 25 July 2026 |
| 15 | Tokyo ePrix | Japan | Tokyo Street Circuit | 26 July 2026 |
| 16 | London ePrix | United Kingdom | ExCeL London Circuit | 15 August 2026 |
| 17 | London ePrix | United Kingdom | ExCeL London Circuit | 16 August 2026 |

=== Location changes ===
- The Miami ePrix once again changed its venue: After just a single year of running on the Homestead-Miami Speedway road course, the race switched to the Miami International Autodrome, the venue which also hosts Formula One's Miami Grand Prix.
- Formula E made its racing debut at Circuito del Jarama, with the track holding the inaugural Madrid ePrix after previously hosting season eleven's pre-season test when the Circuit Ricardo Tormo was unavailable due to flooding in the area. Jarama is the longest Formula E track, beating a record set by Homestead–Miami Speedway in Season 11.
- The Sanya ePrix returned after last being raced at in Season 5, while the Jakarta ePrix was dropped after a contract fell through.

=== ePrix locations ===
Location of ePrix in season 12
(ePrix - Single Race)
(ePrix - Double Header)

== Regulation changes ==
=== Sporting regulations ===
The format used in qualifying has been slightly altered, with the two group stage sessions shortened from twelve to ten minutes each. The requirement for every driver to set a laptime in the first half of group qualifying has also been removed.

Races including a mandatory pit boost stop now require drivers to only take attack mode once instead of twice.

== Season report ==
=== Pre-season ===
After the pre-season test for the 2024–25 season had to be relocated to Circuito del Jarama due to flooding in Valencia, Formula E returned to Circuit Ricardo Tormo ahead of the 2025–26 season, with six sessions held on 27–30 October. Mahindra's Edoardo Mortara posted the fastest time of the test in the penultimate session, leading Nissan's defending champion Oliver Rowland, DS Penske's new signing Taylor Barnard and the second Nissan of Norman Nato, with the top four separated by less than a hundreth of a second and the whole field less than 0.9 seconds apart. The test once again featured a mock race which was also used to test yellow flag and red flag procedures during pit boost stops and was won by Porsche's Nico Müller. Like in the season before, the official pre-season test was followed by an all-female test, this time consisting of two separate sessions. F1 Academy driver Chloe Chambers posted the fastest time for Mahindra, ahead of Abbi Pulling's Nissan.

=== Opening rounds ===
Porsche's Pascal Wehrlein was fastest in qualifying for the season-opening São Paulo ePrix, but a penalty demoted him to fourth on the grid and allowed Andretti's Jake Dennis to start the race first. Dennis, Mortara, Wehrlein, Nato and Jaguar's António Félix da Costa formed the top group in the opening stages, with Rowland and Citroën's Jean-Éric Vergne joining the lead battle through the first round of attack mode activations. The two Nissan drivers collided on lap 17, with Nato suffering a puncture. Citroën's Nick Cassidy rose through the field after taking his second attack mode. A clash between Mortara and Lola's Lucas di Grassi on lap 22 caused a safety car, with all leaders bar Dennis already into their second attack mode. That allowed him to take attack mode and the lead once racing resumed, but Cupra Kiro's Pepe Martí then misjudged a full course yellow thrown for Jaguar's Mitch Evans. He heavily collided with two other cars, flew into the air and caused a red flag. Dennis led the one-lap resumption, winning ahead of Rowland and Cassidy.

Pole position for the Mexico City ePrix went to Envision's Sébastien Buemi ahead of Barnard after the latter's final lap was judged to be outside track limits and deleted. Buemi went straight on at the opening corner and dropped to the back, handing the lead to Barnard before Wehrlein took over at the front after being the first to activate attack mode. That saw him fall back down the order later on, however, before a retirement for Mahindra's Nyck de Vries caused an interruption on lap 17. That favored the drivers who had not yet taken their attack mode, among them Cassidy, who took a six-minute activation to rise from outside the top ten into the lead. He led a queue of cars that all had four minutes of attack mode left, while he had only two. Still, he was able to fend off Mortara and Dennis over the final laps, with Rowland using the battle at the front to get past Barnard into fourth. That turned into third when Dennis ran out of energy at the end of the race, while Cassidy held on to win Formula E's 150th race and claim the championship lead.

Müller secured his maiden Formula E pole position in the series' inaugural qualifying session around the Miami International Autodrome. Rain ahead of the race saw the field start behind the safety car, with a standing start afterwards. Andretti's Felipe Drugovich was the first to take attack mode, using it to claim the lead as the top seven broke away from the rest of the field. Müller and Drugovich traded first place, each trying to conserve energy, before Da Costa and Evans also joined the fight. The latter had taken his first attack mode on lap nineteen to rise up the field and end up third. The Jaguar drivers ran side by side entering lap 24, with Evans moving into second behind Müller. Da Costa was then removed from contention when Drugovich outbraked himself and ran into his back on lap 26. Evans took the lead from Müller with a great move on lap 27, holding on throughout the final round of attack modes to secure a record-breaking fifteenth Formula E win. Wehrlein took third to close up to two points behind Cassidy in the standings.

Mortara took Mahindra’s first pole position since 2024 in qualifying for the first of the two Jeddah ePrix races. However, his start to the race was disastrous as he bogged down and fell to fifth. Günther took the lead and held it through an early safety car phase, with Nato, Barnard and Wehrlein behind him. Nato took first place after the restart, while Wehrlein made his way into second on lap 14. By that point, the pitstop window for the first use of pit boost of the season began to open. A third of the field stopped on lap 15, with others electing to first take their sole attack mode in hopes of overcutting other cars. Günther was among those who first activated the 350kw power mode, and it saw him reclaim the lead after the stops had played out. However, Wehrlein was right behind him and had yet to take his attack mode. He did so on lap 20, took the lead right away and drew out a seven-second gap to win his 100th Formula E race and take the championship lead. Günther dropped down further as Mortara and Evans completed the podium.

The second race in Jeddah saw Mortara go back-to-back in qualifying as he claimed another pole position by beating Dennis in the final. This time, he was able to defend his lead at the start, before the field started working to conserve energy and the lead changed hands multiple times. Rowland, Buemi and Da Costa all held first place during the opening part, before the first round of attack mode activations began on lap eleven. Rowland activated his higher power mode on lap 16 and hit the front shortly after. Da Costa followed a lap later and claimed the lead on lap 20. Rowland fell to third behind Cupra Kiro's Dan Ticktum, before he activated his second attack mode. Da Costa crucially managed to hold on to the lead when taking his second attack mode, and with Ticktum defending from Rowland, the Portuguese was able to build a gap. That allowed him to claim his first race win for Jaguar, with Buemi taking second and Rowland having to settle for third. Points leader Wehrlein came eighth, his lead gap reduced to six points.

=== Mid-season rounds ===
Formula E's competitive debut around the Circuito del Jarama began with Cassidy besting De Vries in the qualifying final to take pole position. De Vries lost positions shortly after the start and crashed into Wehrlein when he attempted to get back to the front, removing him from competition. Cassidy held the lead until both Kiro cars passed him after activating their attack modes. Da Costa was among the first drivers to take their pit boost stop, which would prove crucial as the front group waited until lap 14 until they came in. By that point, they were undercut by the earlier stoppers, with Cassidy dropping outside the top ten. Günther assumed the lead after fighting off Da Costa, before the Portuguese came back past on lap 17. The top group then all activated their attack mode, with Evans utilizing it best to climb up to second place. Team orders kept him from fighting Da Costa, who secured back-to-back wins and led a Jaguar 1-2 as Wehrlein beat Ticktum to third exiting the final corner of the race, thereby extending his lead to eleven points.

Next came the Berlin ePrix: Mortara was back on top in qualifying for the first race and Wehrlein started from second. The race began with Mortara leading from the line as Rowland immediately jumped Wehrlein for second and then overtook Mortara for the lead on the second lap. The lead changed hands multiple times as drivers intentionally dropped back to focus on energy conservation. Drivers began stopping for their pit boost on lap 21, while Rowland waited until lap 26 to regain the lead via an overcut. During this period, championship leader Wehrlein suffered a puncture that forced him into an early stop and out of contention. On Lap 28, Müller activated his six-minute attack mode after amassing a 4% energy advantage and sliced through the field, moving from sixth to first by Lap 29. Dennis was on a similar trajectory, but failed to activate his attack mode twice. Müller ultimately secured his maiden Formula E victory ahead of Cassidy and Rowland as Mortara took over the championship lead from the non-scoring Wehrlein.

A day later, Wehrlein bounced back from his non-score and took pole position ahead of Barnard as several frontrunners intentionally compromised their qualifying to save tires for the race. The race began with a phase of heavy energy saving, leading to multiple lead changes among the close pack. De Vries and Cassidy both suffered damage after collisions and eventually retired from the race. The Nissan pair of Rowland and Nato rose to the front after taking their first attack mode, with Nato building a two-second gap by lap 21. Evans followed the pair up the order a few laps later, before a crucial six-minute attack mode activation on lap 27 allowed him to take the lead. Wehrlein briefly moved back in front during the final round of attack mode activations, but he retook the position on lap 33 once Wehrlein’s boost expired. Evans held on through a late full course yellow to extend his win record and move into second in the standings. Rowland took third and Wehrlein reclaimed the championship lead in third, just three points ahead of Evans.

Ticktum claimed pole position for the first race of the Monaco ePrix double-header, with De Vries lining up beside him. He maintained his lead at the start before the title battle took a significant turn on lap 12 when Müller collided with his teammate Wehrlein. The contact gave championship leader Wehrlein a puncture that dropped him to the back of the field. De Vries was among the first drivers to make his mandatory pit stop on lap 16. That allowed him to undercut Ticktum before he used his attack mode to overtake Da Costa for the lead, which he held until the finish. Behind him, the battle for the final podium spot ended in a late-race collision between Ticktum and Da Costa exiting the tunnel. Da Costa retired, while Ticktum finished third on the road before a penalty for the collision demoted him to 12th place. De Vries claimed his first victory for Mahindra and his first in Formula E since 2022. Evans finished second, overtaking Wehrlein for the lead of the championship by 15 points, while Martí took his maiden career podium in third.

Qualifying for the second race of the weekend saw Ticktum take pole position again, recording the largest pole margin of the season at 0.676 seconds. Da Costa qualified second, but dropped to the back of the field following a first-lap collision with Mortara at the Nouvelle Chicane. Mortara was subsequently handed a ten-second penalty for the incident. Ticktum initially stayed in front, but a belated attack mode activation saw him drop behind the other front-runners. A penalty for speeding under a full course yellow then eliminated him from contention. Rowland, starting from eighth, utilized a patient energy-saving strategy to move up the order while other front-runners faltered. He took the lead with five laps remaining and maintained his advantage to claim his first victory of the season. Drugovich finished in a career-best second place, securing his first Formula E podium. After a great recovery from the rear of the pack, Da Costa rounded out the podium in third. Evans finished fourth, thereby extending his championship lead to 19 points.

Round eleven of the season saw the return of the Sanya ePrix, and Dennis took pole position ahead of his teammate Drugovich for the first race held there since 2019. He kept his lead at the start, before Wehrlein, who had charged through the field from eighth, took the lead on lap 8. A chaotic middle phase then saw frequent lead changes between Ticktum, Cassidy and Mortara before a red flag was triggered on lap 19 when a collision between Ticktum and Evans caused a multi-car pile-up. Championship leader Evans was unable to resume the race on the lead lap, ending his point-scoring streak. Following the restart, Dennis worked his way back to the front, reclaiming the lead on lap 34 as rivals Rowland crashed out and Da Costa was hit with a penalty. Dennis secured victory, with Drugovich initially making it an Andretti 1-2 before a post-race penalty promoted Marti to second and De Vries to third. Despite his non-score, Evans maintained his championship lead as his title rivals Rowland, Mortara and Wehrlein also failed to score points.

=== Closing rounds ===
Wehrlein claimed pole position for the first race of the Shanghai ePrix double-header, two tenths ahead of championship leader Evans. He retained his lead at the start of the race and only briefly lost first place to Dennis, before pitting for his mandatory pit boost stop at the end of lap 15 and cycling back into the lead once the stops had played out. Rain began falling from lap five, before a heavy downpour on lap 19 saw the race director deploy the safety car. That decision denied multiple drivers the full use of their attack mode, among them Mortara, who had climbed to third, Martí, Ticktum and Cassidy. Racing resumed on lap 22 with one lap added to the race, and Wehrlein immediately activated his attack mode to pull away, allowing him to claim victory. Da Costa was unable to close back on him in the latter stages and finished second, 1.6 seconds behind. Dennis completed the podium ahead of Andretti teammate Drugovich, while Evans finished eighth, his pre-race championship lead over Wehrlein cut from 19 points to just three.

Qualifying for the second race saw Drugovich claim his maiden pole position. Wet conditions forced the race to start behind the safety car, with a standing start following on lap four. Drugovich held the lead, but Wehrlein moved ahead after taking his first attack mode, with Müller working alongside him at the front. Buemi and Eriksson then rose into contention on superior energy, with the duo demoting Wehrlein from the lead. A full course yellow was triggered on lap 24 when Maloney stopped on the start/finish straight, neutralising the attack modes Eriksson and Vergne had just activated. Di Grassi, who still had his in hand, passed Eriksson on the penultimate lap as Vergne took the lead. Di Grassi then swept around Vergne on the final lap to reclaim first place, holding on for Lola Yamaha's maiden win and his own first victory since 2022. Vergne came second ahead of Eriksson's first podium, while Wehrlein came home fourth. Evans, who failed to start the race after a technical issue, lost the championship lead to Wehrlein by nine points.

The penultimate race weekend of the year, the Tokyo ePrix, saw Dennis take pole position ahead of Mortara as championship leaders Evans and Wehrlein both failed to reach the duel stage. Dennis kept his lead through the opening stint, before Ticktum, who employed an aggressive strategy of an early attack mode activation coupled with an early pit stop, was able to use the clean air after his stop to overcut him and cycle to the front. While Dennis was able to retake the lead with six laps to go, he was forced to heavily conserve energy in the final stages of the race. Ticktum initially refrained from attacking Dennis, working together with him to gap the rest of the field led by Cassidy and Evans. On the final lap however, he reclaimed the lead with a move into the penultimate corner, securing his second career victory. Evans' fourth-place finish after qualifying 16th saw meant he was able to retake the lead of the championship by three points, after pre-event leader Wehrlein collided with Da Costa during a mid-race battle and retired.

Mortara took pole position for the second race ahead of Da Costa, tying the single-season record of four pole positions. Heavy rain shortly before the race saw the grid split between wet and dry setups. Mortara led the field away after an initial lap behind the safety car, before Da Costa took the lead on lap 4. With the track drying rapidly, the dry setup quickly became the favorable one, leading to Rowland and Barnard moving to the front. De Vries, who had started fifth, was able to take the lead on lap 28, before a multi-car collision between Mortara and Eriksson blocked the circuit, triggering a late-race red flag. Cassidy and Dennis, also both running dry setups, ran behind De Vries at that point, with Dennis' attack mode activation neutralized by the stoppage. De Vries held on to his lead through a one-lap restart, claiming victory ahead of Cassidy and Dennis. With Evans and Wehrlein both out of the points again, Dennis was able to take a two-point championship lead while also helping Porsche defend their Manufacturer's Championship title.

The final double-header of the season, the London ePrix, began with a Porsche 1-2 in qualifying of Wehrlein ahead of Müller. That result saw Müller hold up the pack around the tight circuit, allowing Wehrlein to build a gap up front early on. Evans, stuck behind Müller in third, pitted on lap 16 and took attack mode right away, hoping to undercut Wehrlein once the leader would make his stop. On lap 21, a full course yellow for Di Grassi's stricken car allowed Wehrlein, Dennis and Da Costa to make their pitstops while the field was running at reduced speed. That allowed Wehrlein to retain the net lead, while Dennis was able to pass Da Costa for third place after their stops. Wehrlein cycled back to the front once everyone had stopped, before both Dennis and Da Costa passed Ticktum, who had risen up the order to second but was struggling with energy saving. Wehrlein led the rest of the race, with his victory also handing him a five-point lead over Dennis. Evans finished eighth and dropped to third in the standings, 19 points behind the leader.

Qualifying for the season finale produced an all-Mahindra front row after De Vries beat Mortara in the final. Wehrlein started third, with Evans fifth and Dennis down in 16th place. Da Costa passed Wehrlein after an early attack mode and held him behind in an effort to aid his teammate. That allowed the two Mahindras and Barnard, who had moved into third, to gap the rest of the field. Da Costa and Wehrlein continued battling, with Evans getting past both of them in the process. A stern defensive move by Da Costa saw both of them fall outside the points on lap 27, with Dennis moving ahead of the pair. He then collided with Eriksson on lap 31, spinning the Envision driver around and blocking the path for both himself and Wehrlein, resulting in both falling to the back of the field. Evans, running in fourth at that point, would have needed a win to take the title, but with just one lap to go, Barnard took his maiden victory after beating both Mahindra drivers. Wehrlein therefore took the title, with Jaguar winning the Teams' Championship.

== Results and standings ==
=== E-Prix ===
| Round | E-Prix | Pole position | Fastest lap | Winning driver | Winning team | Winning manufacturer | Report |
|---|---|---|---|---|---|---|---|
| 1 | (Brazil) São Paulo | (Germany) Pascal Wehrlein (Note: Pascal Wehrlein set the fastest time in qualifying and was credited with pole position, but received a 3-place grid penalty for wheelspinning in the pitlane during qualifying. Jake Dennis started the race from first place.) | (France) Norman Nato (Note: Norman Nato set the fastest lap, but did not finish in the top 10, so was ineligible to be the point-scorer for the fastest lap. Oliver Rowland was the point-scorer instead for setting the fastest lap of those finishing in the top 10.) | (United Kingdom) Jake Dennis | (United States) Andretti Formula E | (Germany) Porsche | Report |
| 2 | Mexico City | (Switzerland) Sébastien Buemi | (United Kingdom) Jake Dennis | (New Zealand) Nick Cassidy | (France) Citroën Racing | (Netherlands) Stellantis | Report |
| 3 | (United States) Miami | (Switzerland) Nico Müller | (United Kingdom) Oliver Rowland (Note: Oliver Rowland set the fastest lap, but did not finish in the top 10, so was ineligible to be the point-scorer for the fastest lap. Mitch Evans was the point-scorer instead for setting the fastest lap of those finishing in the top 10.) | (New Zealand) Mitch Evans | (United Kingdom) Jaguar TCS Racing | (United Kingdom) Jaguar | Report |
| 4 | (Saudi Arabia) Jeddah | (Switzerland) Edoardo Mortara | (United Kingdom) Dan Ticktum (Note: Dan Ticktum set the fastest lap, but did not finish in the top 10, so was ineligible to be the point-scorer for the fastest lap. Pascal Wehrlein was the point-scorer instead for setting the fastest lap of those finishing in the top 10.) | (Germany) Pascal Wehrlein | (Germany) Porsche Formula E Team | (Germany) Porsche | Report |
| 5 | (Saudi Arabia) Jeddah | (Switzerland) Edoardo Mortara | (United Kingdom) Jake Dennis (Note: Jake Dennis set the fastest lap, but did not finish in the top 10, so was ineligible to be the point-scorer for the fastest lap. Pepe Martí was the point-scorer instead for setting the fastest lap of those finishing in the top 10.) | (Portugal) António Félix da Costa | (United Kingdom) Jaguar TCS Racing | (United Kingdom) Jaguar | Report |
| 6 | (Spain) Madrid | (New Zealand) Nick Cassidy | (Netherlands) Nyck de Vries (Note: Nyck de Vries set the fastest lap, but did not finish in the top 10, so was ineligible to be the point-scorer for the fastest lap. Nico Müller was the point-scorer instead for setting the fastest lap of those finishing in the top 10.) | (Portugal) António Félix da Costa | (United Kingdom) Jaguar TCS Racing | (United Kingdom) Jaguar | Report |
| 7 | (Germany) Berlin | (Switzerland) Edoardo Mortara | (Germany) Pascal Wehrlein (Note: Pascal Wehrlein set the fastest lap, but did not finish in the top 10, so was ineligible to be the point-scorer for the fastest lap. Jake Dennis was the point-scorer instead for setting the fastest lap of those finishing in the top 10.) | (Switzerland) Nico Müller | (Germany) Porsche Formula E Team | (Germany) Porsche | Report |
| 8 | (Germany) Berlin | (Germany) Pascal Wehrlein | (United Kingdom) Oliver Rowland | (New Zealand) Mitch Evans | (United Kingdom) Jaguar TCS Racing | (United Kingdom) Jaguar | Report |
| 9 | Monaco | (United Kingdom) Dan Ticktum | (Germany) Maximilian Günther | (Netherlands) Nyck de Vries | (India) Mahindra Racing | (India) Mahindra | Report |
| 10 | Monaco | (United Kingdom) Dan Ticktum | (France) Jean-Éric Vergne (Note: Jean-Éric Vergne set the fastest lap, but did not finish in the top 10, so was ineligible to be the point-scorer for the fastest lap. Oliver Rowland was the point-scorer instead for setting the fastest lap of those finishing in the top 10.) | (United Kingdom) Oliver Rowland | (Japan) Nissan Formula E Team | (Japan) Nissan | Report |
| 11 | (China) Sanya | (United Kingdom) Jake Dennis | (Netherlands) Nyck de Vries | (United Kingdom) Jake Dennis | (United States) Andretti Formula E | (Germany) Porsche | Report |
| 12 | (China) Shanghai | (Germany) Pascal Wehrlein | (Switzerland) Edoardo Mortara (Note: Edoardo Mortara set the fastest lap, but did not finish in the top 10, so was ineligible to be the point-scorer for the fastest lap. António Félix da Costa was the point-scorer instead for setting the fastest lap of those finishing in the top 10.) | (Germany) Pascal Wehrlein | (Germany) Porsche Formula E Team | (Germany) Porsche | Report |
| 13 | (China) Shanghai | (Brazil) Felipe Drugovich | (United Kingdom) Oliver Rowland | (Brazil) Lucas di Grassi | (United Kingdom) Lola Yamaha ABT Formula E Team | (United Kingdom) Lola-Yamaha | Report |
| 14 | (Japan) Tokyo | (United Kingdom) Jake Dennis | (United Kingdom) Dan Ticktum | (United Kingdom) Dan Ticktum | (United States) Cupra Kiro | (Germany) Porsche | Report |
| 15 | (Japan) Tokyo | (Switzerland) Edoardo Mortara | (United Kingdom) Jake Dennis | (Netherlands) Nyck de Vries | (India) Mahindra Racing | (India) Mahindra | Report |
| 16 | (United Kingdom) London | (Germany) Pascal Wehrlein | (United Kingdom) Oliver Rowland | (Germany) Pascal Wehrlein | (Germany) Porsche Formula E Team | (Germany) Porsche | Report |
| 17 | (United Kingdom) London | (Netherlands) Nyck de Vries | (United Kingdom) Dan Ticktum (Note: Dan Ticktum set the fastest lap, but did not finish in the top 10, so was ineligible to be the point-scorer for the fastest lap. Oliver Rowland was the point-scorer instead for setting the fastest lap of those finishing in the top 10.) | (United Kingdom) Taylor Barnard | (United States) DS Penske | (Netherlands) Stellantis | Report |

=== Drivers' Championship ===
Points were awarded using the following structure:

| Position | 1st | 2nd | 3rd | 4th | 5th | 6th | 7th | 8th | 9th | 10th | Pole | FL |
|---|---|---|---|---|---|---|---|---|---|---|---|---|
| Points | 25 | 18 | 15 | 12 | 10 | 8 | 6 | 4 | 2 | 1 | 3 | 1 |

| Pos. | Driver | SAO (Brazil) | MEX (Mexico) | MIA (United States) | JED (Saudi Arabia) | | MAD (Spain) | BER (Germany) | | MCO (Monaco) | | SYX (China) | SHA (China) | | TKO (Japan) | | LDN (United Kingdom) | | Pts |
|---|---|---|---|---|---|---|---|---|---|---|---|---|---|---|---|---|---|---|---|
| 1 | (Germany) Pascal Wehrlein | **4** | 6 | 3 | 1 | 8 | 3 | 19 | **3** | 18 | 11 | 14 | **1** | 4 | Ret | 13 | **1** | 14 | 169 |
| 2 | (United Kingdom) Jake Dennis | 1 | 5 | 10 | 9 | 19 | 6 | 5 | 6 | Ret | 12 | **1** | 3 | 13 | **2** | 3 | 2 | 18 | 164 |
| 3 | (New Zealand) Mitch Evans | Ret | 11 | 1 | 3 | 7 | 2 | 6 | 1 | 2 | 4 | Ret | 8 | DNS | 4 | Ret | 8 | 4 | 160 |
| 4 | (United Kingdom) Oliver Rowland | 2 | 3 | 12 | 17 | 3 | 16 | 3 | 2 | 15 | 1 | Ret | 12 | 8 | 7 | 4 | 10 | 9 | 137 |
| 5 | (Switzerland) Edoardo Mortara | Ret | 2 | 6 | **2** | **4** | 5 | **4** | 7 | 17 | 5 | Ret | 15 | 16 | 5 | **Ret** | 7 | 3 | 137 |
| 6 | (Portugal) António Félix da Costa | 11 | Ret | 8 | 5 | 1 | 1 | 10 | 18 | Ret | 3 | 4 | 2 | 14 | 9 | 14 | 3 | 15 | 128 |
| 7 | (Netherlands) Nyck de Vries | 9 | Ret | 5 | DNS | 20 | 18 | 9 | Ret | 1 | 8 | 3 | 5 | 18 | 17 | 1 | 13 | **2** | 115 |
| 8 | (New Zealand) Nick Cassidy | 3 | 1 | 16 | 6 | 14 | **17** | 2 | Ret | 9 | 18 | Ret | 19 | 15 | 3 | 2 | 9 | 6 | 114 |
| 9 | (Switzerland) Nico Müller | 5 | 9 | **2** | 4 | 16 | 8 | 1 | 13 | 11 | 6 | 7 | 10 | 7 | 18 | 7 | 11 | 12 | 102 |
| 10 | (Switzerland) Sébastien Buemi | 8 | **17** | 7 | 7 | 2 | 7 | 12 | 4 | 5 | 17 | 13 | 17 | 5 | 14 | 15 | 4 | 5 | 97 |
| 11 | (United Kingdom) Taylor Barnard | 13 | 4 | 14 | 10 | 10 | 19 | 8 | 11 | 7 | 15 | 9 | 16 | 9 | 10 | 8 | 5 | 1 | 68 |
| 12 | (France) Jean-Éric Vergne | Ret | 8 | 15 | 8 | 9 | 14 | 14 | 8 | 16 | 16 | 8 | 6 | 2 | 6 | 5 | Ret | 7 | 68 |
| 13 | (Spain) Pepe Martí | Ret | 7 | 9 | 14 | 6 | 9 | 7 | 12 | 3 | Ret | 2 | 14 | 12 | 8 | Ret | Ret | 8 | 66 |
| 14 | (Brazil) Felipe Drugovich | 12 | 15 | 18 | 15 | 12 | 15 | 13 | 9 | 4 | 2 | 5 | 4 | **6** | 13 | 16 | 16 | 13 | 65 |
| 15 | (United Kingdom) Dan Ticktum | Ret | Ret | Ret | 12 | 5 | 4 | 20† | 14 | **12** | **14** | 15 | 13 | 11 | 1 | 12 | 6 | 16 | 62 |
| 16 | (Sweden) Joel Eriksson | 7 | 14 | 4 | 18 | 13 | 10 | 16 | 10 | 6 | 7 | 12 | 7 | 3 | 12 | Ret | 14 | Ret | 55 |
| 17 | (Brazil) Lucas di Grassi | Ret | 13 | 13 | 16 | 15 | 12 | 17 | 16 | 8 | 9 | 10 | 18 | 1 | 11 | 11 | Ret | Ret | 32 |
| 18 | (Germany) Maximilian Günther | 6 | 12 | 19 | 11 | 11 | 13 | 11 | 15 | 10 | 13 | 6 | 9 | 10 | 15 | 9 | 12 | 11 | 23 |
| 19 | (France) Norman Nato | Ret | 10 | 17 | 13 | 17 | 11 | 18 | 5 | 14 | Ret | Ret | 20 | 17 | 16 | 6 | 15 | 10 | 20 |
| 20 | (Barbados) Zane Maloney | 10 | 16 | 11 | Ret | 18 | 20 | 15 | 17 | 13 | 10 | 11 | 11 | Ret | 19 | 10 | Ret | 17 | 3 |
| Pos. | Driver | SAO (Brazil) | MEX (Mexico) | MIA (United States) | JED (Saudi Arabia) | | MAD (Spain) | BER (Germany) | | MCO (Monaco) | | SYX (China) | SHA (China) | | TKO (Japan) | | LDN (United Kingdom) | | Pts |

| Colour | Result |
|---|---|
| Gold | Winner |
| Silver | Second place |
| Bronze | Third place |
| Green | Points classification |
| Blue | Non-points classification |
| Blue | Non-classified finish (NC) |
| Purple | Retired, not classified (Ret) |
| Red | Did not qualify (DNQ) |
| Red | Did not pre-qualify (DNPQ) |
| Black | Disqualified (DSQ) |
| White | Did not start (DNS) |
| White | Withdrew (WD) |
| White | Race cancelled (C) |
| Blank | Did not practice (DNP) |
| Blank | Did not arrive (DNA) |
| Blank | Excluded (EX) |

**Bold** – Pole

Italics – Fastest lap

=== Teams' Championship ===
| Pos. | Team | No. | SAO (Brazil) | MEX (Mexico) | MIA (United States) | JED (Saudi Arabia) | | MAD (Spain) | BER (Germany) | | MCO (Monaco) | | SYX (China) | SHA (China) | | TKO (Japan) | | LDN (United Kingdom) | | Pts |
|---|---|---|---|---|---|---|---|---|---|---|---|---|---|---|---|---|---|---|---|---|
| 1 | (United Kingdom) Jaguar TCS Racing | 9 | Ret | 11 | 1 | 3 | 7 | 2 | 6 | 1 | 2 | 4 | Ret | 8 | DNS | 4 | Ret | 8 | 4 | 288 |
| 1 | (United Kingdom) Jaguar TCS Racing | 13 | 11 | Ret | 8 | 5 | 1 | 1 | 10 | 18 | Ret | 3 | 4 | 2 | 14 | 9 | 14 | 3 | 15 | 288 |
| 2 | (Germany) Porsche Formula E Team | 51 | 5 | 9 | **2** | 4 | 16 | 8 | 1 | 13 | 11 | 6 | 7 | 10 | 7 | 18 | 7 | 11 | 12 | 271 |
| 2 | (Germany) Porsche Formula E Team | 94 | **4** | 6 | 3 | 1 | 8 | 3 | 19 | **3** | 18 | 11 | 14 | **1** | 4 | Ret | 13 | **1** | 14 | 271 |
| 3 | (India) Mahindra Racing | 21 | 9 | Ret | 5 | DNS | 20 | 18 | 9 | Ret | 1 | 8 | 3 | 5 | 18 | 17 | 1 | 13 | **2** | 252 |
| 3 | (India) Mahindra Racing | 48 | Ret | 2 | 6 | **2** | **4** | 5 | **4** | 7 | 17 | 5 | Ret | 15 | 16 | 5 | **Ret** | 7 | 3 | 252 |
| 4 | (United States) Andretti Formula E | 27 | 1 | 5 | 10 | 9 | 19 | 6 | 5 | 6 | Ret | 12 | **1** | 3 | 13 | **2** | 3 | 2 | 18 | 229 |
| 4 | (United States) Andretti Formula E | 28 | 12 | 15 | 18 | 15 | 12 | 15 | 13 | 9 | 4 | 2 | 5 | 4 | **6** | 13 | 16 | 16 | 13 | 229 |
| 5 | (France) Citroën Racing | 25 | Ret | 8 | 15 | 8 | 9 | 14 | 14 | 8 | 16 | 16 | 8 | 6 | 2 | 6 | 5 | Ret | 7 | 182 |
| 5 | (France) Citroën Racing | 37 | 3 | 1 | 16 | 6 | 14 | **17** | 2 | Ret | 9 | 18 | Ret | 19 | 15 | 3 | 2 | 9 | 6 | 182 |
| 6 | (Japan) Nissan Formula E Team | 1 | 2 | 3 | 12 | 17 | 3 | 16 | 3 | 2 | 15 | 1 | Ret | 12 | 8 | 7 | 4 | 10 | 9 | 157 |
| 6 | (Japan) Nissan Formula E Team | 23 | Ret | 10 | 17 | 13 | 17 | 11 | 18 | 5 | 14 | Ret | Ret | 20 | 17 | 16 | 6 | 15 | 10 | 157 |
| 7 | (United Kingdom) Envision Racing | 14 | 7 | 14 | 4 | 18 | 13 | 10 | 16 | 10 | 6 | 7 | 12 | 7 | 3 | 12 | Ret | 14 | Ret | 152 |
| 7 | (United Kingdom) Envision Racing | 16 | 8 | **17** | 7 | 7 | 2 | 7 | 12 | 4 | 5 | 17 | 13 | 17 | 5 | 14 | 15 | 4 | 5 | 152 |
| 8 | (United States) Cupra Kiro | 3 | Ret | 7 | 9 | 14 | 6 | 9 | 7 | 12 | 3 | Ret | 2 | 14 | 12 | 8 | Ret | Ret | 8 | 128 |
| 8 | (United States) Cupra Kiro | 33 | Ret | Ret | Ret | 12 | 5 | 4 | 20† | 14 | **12** | **14** | 15 | 13 | 11 | 1 | 12 | 6 | 16 | 128 |
| 9 | (United States) DS Penske | 7 | 6 | 12 | 19 | 11 | 11 | 13 | 11 | 15 | 10 | 13 | 6 | 9 | 10 | 15 | 9 | 12 | 11 | 91 |
| 9 | (United States) DS Penske | 77 | 13 | 4 | 14 | 10 | 10 | 19 | 8 | 11 | 7 | 15 | 9 | 16 | 9 | 10 | 8 | 5 | 1 | 91 |
| 10 | (United Kingdom) Lola Yamaha ABT Formula E Team | 11 | Ret | 13 | 13 | 16 | 15 | 12 | 17 | 16 | 8 | 9 | 10 | 18 | 1 | 11 | 11 | Ret | Ret | 35 |
| 10 | (United Kingdom) Lola Yamaha ABT Formula E Team | 22 | 10 | 16 | 11 | Ret | 18 | 20 | 15 | 17 | 13 | 10 | 11 | 11 | Ret | 19 | 10 | Ret | 17 | 35 |
| Pos. | Team | No. | SAO (Brazil) | MEX (Mexico) | MIA (United States) | JED (Saudi Arabia) | | MAD (Spain) | BER (Germany) | | MCO (Monaco) | | SYX (China) | SHA (China) | | TKO (Japan) | | LDN (United Kingdom) | | Pts |

=== Manufacturers' Championship ===
The highest-placed two cars per powertrain manufacturer per race scored points towards that manufacturer's position in the standings. The cars that did not score any points do not appear in the standings and the points were allocated to the following Manufacturer's car eligible to score points. Points allocated for the driver obtaining the Pole Position and the Fastest Lap were not counted.

| Pos. | Manufacturer | SAO (Brazil) | MEX (Mexico) | MIA (United States) | JED (Saudi Arabia) | | MAD (Spain) | BER (Germany) | | MCO (Monaco) | | SYX (China) | SHA (China) | | TKO (Japan) | | LDN (United Kingdom) | | Pts |
|---|---|---|---|---|---|---|---|---|---|---|---|---|---|---|---|---|---|---|---|
| 1 | (Germany) Porsche | 1 | 5 | 2 | 1 | 5 | 3 | 1 | 3 | 3 | 2 | 1 | 1 | 4 | 1 | 3 | 1 | 7 | 498 |
| 1 | (Germany) Porsche | 4 | 6 | 3 | 4 | 6 | 4 | 5 | 6 | 4 | 6 | 2 | 3 | 6 | 2 | 7 | 2 | 10 | 498 |
| 2 | (United Kingdom) Jaguar | 6 | 8 | 1 | 3 | 1 | 1 | 6 | 1 | 2 | 3 | 4 | 2 | 3 | 4 | 10 | 3 | 4 | 400 |
| 2 | (United Kingdom) Jaguar | 7 | 10 | 4 | 5 | 2 | 2 | 9 | 4 | 5 | 4 | 9 | 6 | 5 | 8 | 11 | 4 | 5 | 400 |
| 3 | (Netherlands) Stellantis | 3 | 1 | 10 | 6 | 7 | 8 | 2 | 8 | 6 | 10 | 5 | 5 | 2 | 3 | 2 | 5 | 1 | 292 |
| 3 | (Netherlands) Stellantis | 5 | 4 | 11 | 7 | 8 | 9 | 7 | 9 | 8 | 11 | 6 | 7 | 8 | 6 | 5 | 7 | 6 | 292 |
| 4 | (India) Mahindra | 8 | 2 | 5 | 2 | 4 | 5 | 4 | 7 | 1 | 5 | 3 | 4 | 9 | 5 | 1 | 6 | 2 | 251 |
| 4 | (India) Mahindra | Ret | Ret | 6 | DNS | 12 | 11 | 8 | Ret | 12 | 7 | Ret | 10 | 11 | 11 | Ret | 9 | 3 | 251 |
| 5 | (Japan) Nissan | 2 | 3 | 8 | 8 | 3 | 6 | 3 | 2 | 10 | 1 | Ret | 9 | 7 | 7 | 4 | 8 | 8 | 189 |
| 5 | (Japan) Nissan | Ret | 7 | 12 | 10 | 10 | 10 | 12 | 5 | 11 | Ret | Ret | 12 | 10 | 10 | 6 | 10 | 9 | 189 |
| 6 | (United Kingdom) Lola-Yamaha | 9 | 9 | 7 | 9 | 9 | 7 | 10 | 10 | 7 | 8 | 7 | 8 | 1 | 9 | 8 | Ret | 11 | 85 |
| 6 | (United Kingdom) Lola-Yamaha | Ret | 11 | 9 | Ret | 11 | 12 | 11 | 11 | 9 | 9 | 8 | 11 | Ret | 12 | 9 | Ret | Ret | 85 |
| Pos. | Manufacturer | SAO (Brazil) | MEX (Mexico) | MIA (United States) | JED (Saudi Arabia) | | MAD (Spain) | BER (Germany) | | MCO (Monaco) | | SYX (China) | SHA (China) | | TKO (Japan) | | LDN (United Kingdom) | | Pts |
