= Madrid ePrix =

Formula E race in Community of Madrid, Spain

- Circuito del Jarama (2026)
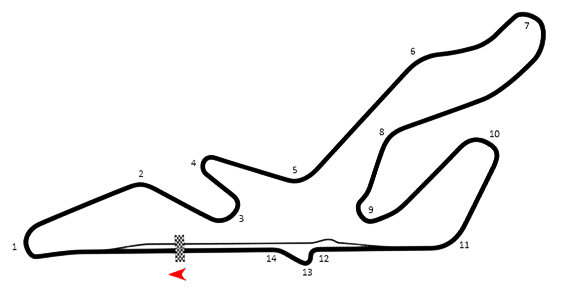

Race information
- First held: 2026
- Most wins (drivers): (Portugal) António Félix da Costa (1)
- Most wins (constructors): (United Kingdom) Jaguar (1)
- Circuit length: 3.934 km (2.444 miles)
- Race length: 90.48 km (56.21 miles)
- Laps: 23

Last race (2026)

Pole position
- (New Zealand) Nick Cassidy; Citroën; 1:37.141

Podium
- 1. (Portugal) António Félix da Costa; Jaguar; 38:26.706; 2. (New Zealand) Mitch Evans; Jaguar; +0.386; 3. (Germany) Pascal Wehrlein; Porsche; +0.799

Fastest lap
- (Netherlands) Nyck de Vries; Mahindra; 1:32.941

The Madrid ePrix is a race of the single-seater, electrically powered Formula E championship, held in Madrid, Spain. It was held for the first time as part of the 2025-26 season.

== History ==
Formula E has had a presence in Spain since the 2017-18 season, when the official pre-season testing session was moved from its previous home at Donington Park to Circuit Ricardo Tormo in Cheste, roughly 25 km from Valencia. Prior to that season, several teams had also used other Spanish circuits for testing purposes such as Circuit de Calafat and Circuito Guadix.

However, the first official ePrix in Spain did not come until 2021, when Circuit Ricardo Tormo hosted a doubleheader on 24 and 25 April, as a replacement for several cancelled rounds due to the COVID-19 pandemic. This was also the first race to take place on a permanent circuit in series history.

In November 2024, due to devastating flooding that affected the Valencian Community and surrounding areas, the series was forced to move its pre-season test from its usual location at Circuit Ricardo Tormo to Circuito del Jarama.

In June 2025, Circuito del Jarama was announced as one of the venues on the 2025-26 calendar, with the first ePrix scheduled us take place on 21 March 2026. By lap length, it is the longest circuit that Formula E has held a race on, surpassing the Homestead-Miami Speedway.

== Circuit ==
The race was held at Circuito del Jarama in San Sebastián de los Reyes, roughly 30 km north of Madrid. The circuit had previously hosted the Spanish Grand Prix nine times between 1968 and 1981, as part of the Formula One World Championship. There is a chicane shortly between the exit of María de Villota and the finish line of the circuit that is unique to Formula E.

== Results ==
Edition	Track	Winner	Second	Third	Pole position	Fastest lap
2026	Circuito del Jarama	(Portugal) António Félix da Costa; Jaguar TCS Racing	(New Zealand) Mitch Evans; Jaguar TCS Racing	(Germany) Pascal Wehrlein; Porsche Formula E Team	(New Zealand) Nick Cassidy; Citroën Racing	(Netherlands) Nyck de Vries; Mahindra Racing
