= Nissan Formula E Team =

Japanese Formula E team

(Japan) Nissan Formula E Team
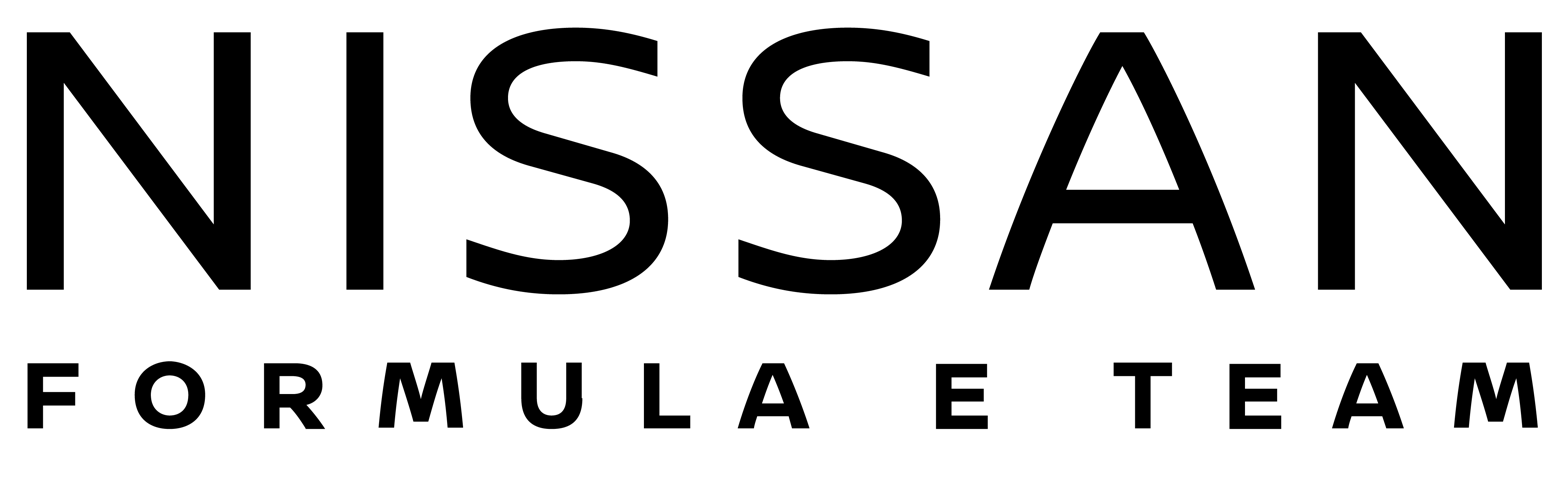
- Founded: 2018
- Base: Le Mans, France
- Team principal(s): Tommaso Volpe
- Current series: Formula E
- Current drivers: (Barbados) Zane Maloney (United Kingdom) Oliver Rowland (United Kingdom) Abbi Pulling
- Noted drivers: (Switzerland) Sébastien Buemi (Germany) Maximilian Günther (France) Sacha Fenestraz (Brazil) Caio Collet (Brazil) Sérgio Sette Câmara (France) Norman Nato
- Races: 120
- Wins: 9
- Podiums: 34
- Poles: 14
- Points: 1131
- Drivers' Championships: Formula E Oliver Rowland (2024–25)
- First entry: 2018 Ad Diriyah ePrix
- Last entry: 2026 London ePrix
- First win: 2019 New York City ePrix (R1)
- Last win: 2026 Monaco ePrix (R2)
- Website: www.nismo.com/formula-e

The Nissan Formula E Team is a Japanese motorsport team owned by Nissan. The team currently competes in the Formula E organized by the Fédération Internationale de l'Automobile (FIA). Nissan made its debut in the series at the 2018 Ad Diriyah ePrix, which opened the 2018–19 Formula E season.

== History ==
In the inaugural season of Formula E, DAMS (as e.dams) partnered with sister company Renault to form Team e.dams Renault, where they became the first Formula E Team's Champion. At the end of the 2017–18 season, Renault decided to focus on Formula One with Nissan taking over Renault's place in the partnership with e.dams to form Nissan e.dams for the 2018–19 season. In April 2022, Nissan announced the acquisition of the e.dams race team and entered the 2022–23 season as Nissan Formula E Team. As of 2026, it is the only international racing series where Nissan and Nismo are competing. The Team won the Drivers' Championship in the 2024–25 season with Oliver Rowland. The current drivers for the Nissan Formula E Team are race drivers Zane Maloney and Oliver Rowland and test drivers Abbi Pulling.

== Results ==
(key) (results in bold indicate pole position; results in italics indicate fastest lap)

2017–18: Renault e.dams
Year	Chassis	Powertrain	Tyres	No.	Drivers	1	2	3	4	5	6	7	8	9	10	11	12	13	14	15	16	17	Points	T.C.
(France) Nissan e.dams
2018–19	Spark SRT05e	Nissan IM01	M			ADR	MRK	SCL	MEX	HKG	SYX	RME	PAR	MCO	BER	BRN	NYC						190	4th
2018–19	Spark SRT05e	Nissan IM01	M	22	(United Kingdom) Oliver Rowland	7	15	Ret	20†	Ret	**2**	6	**12**	**2**	8	Ret	14	6					190	4th
2018–19	Spark SRT05e	Nissan IM01	M	23	(Switzerland) Sébastien Buemi	6	8	**Ret**	21†	Ret	8	5	15	5	**2**	3	**1**	3					190	4th
2019–20	Spark SRT05e	Nissan IM02	M			DIR		SCL	MEX	MRK	BER		BER		BER								167	2nd
2019–20	Spark SRT05e	Nissan IM02	M	22	(United Kingdom) Oliver Rowland	4	5	17	7	9	14	7	6	5	**1**	Ret							167	2nd
2019–20	Spark SRT05e	Nissan IM02	M	23	(Switzerland) Sébastien Buemi	Ret	12	13	3	4	7	2^{G}	11	3	10	3^{G}							167	2nd
2020–21	Spark SRT05e	Nissan IM02; Nissan IM03	M			DIR		RME		VLC		MCO	PUE		NYC		LDN		BER	BER			97	10th
2020–21	Spark SRT05e	Nissan IM02; Nissan IM03	M	22	(United Kingdom) Oliver Rowland	6	7	12^{G}	16	DSQ	4	6	DSQ	**3**	7	19	DSQ	18	13	2			97	10th
2020–21	Spark SRT05e	Nissan IM02; Nissan IM03	M	23	(Switzerland) Sébastien Buemi	13	Ret	5	10	Ret	11	11	DSQ	14	6^{G}	15	DSQ	13	11	14			97	10th
2021–22	Spark SRT05e	Nissan IM03	M			DIR		MEX	RME		MCO	BER		JAK	MRK	NYC		LON		SEO			36	9th
2021–22	Spark SRT05e	Nissan IM03	M	22	(Germany) Maximilian Günther	12	14	9	Ret	11	17	18	16	14	Ret	12	DSQ	8	15	11	Ret		36	9th
2021–22	Spark SRT05e	Nissan IM03	M	23	(Switzerland) Sébastien Buemi	17	13	8	16	9	8	14	14	11	16	5	13	11	6	Ret	9		36	9th
(Japan) Nissan Formula E Team
2022–23	Formula E Gen3	Nissan e-4ORCE 04	H			MEX	DIR		HYD	CPT	SPL	BER		MCO	JAK		PRT	RME		LDN			95	7th
2022–23	Formula E Gen3	Nissan e-4ORCE 04	H	17	(France) Norman Nato	Ret	12	14	7	8	Ret	13	16	18	12	5	9	7	2	8	4		95	7th
2022–23	Formula E Gen3	Nissan e-4ORCE 04	H	23	(France) Sacha Fenestraz	15	17	8	12	**NC**	Ret	12	11	4	19	4	15	10	16	Ret	15		95	7th
2023–24	Formula E Gen3	Nissan e-4ORCE 04	H			MEX	DIR		SAP	TOK	MIS		MCO	BER		SHA		POR		LDN			182	4th
2023–24	Formula E Gen3	Nissan e-4ORCE 04	H	22	(United Kingdom) Oliver Rowland	11	13	**3**	3	**2**	1	Ret	6	3	3	4	10	WD	WD	15	1		182	4th
2023–24	Formula E Gen3	Nissan e-4ORCE 04	H	22	(Brazil) Caio Collet													18	16				182	4th
2023–24	Formula E Gen3	Nissan e-4ORCE 04	H	23	(France) Sacha Fenestraz	12	Ret	6	11	11	9	5	8	9	Ret	11	14	15	18	14	15		182	4th
2024–25	Formula E Gen3 Evo	Nissan e-4ORCE 05	H			SAP	MEX	JED		MIA	MCO		TOK		SHA		JAK	BER		LDN			207	3rd
2024–25	Formula E Gen3 Evo	Nissan e-4ORCE 05	H	17	(France) Norman Nato	13	13	17	15	**6**	14	13	15	17	6	21	14			9	11		207	3rd
2024–25	Formula E Gen3 Evo	Nissan e-4ORCE 05	H	17	(Brazil) Sérgio Sette Câmara													15	9				207	3rd
2024–25	Formula E Gen3 Evo	Nissan e-4ORCE 05	H	23	(United Kingdom) Oliver Rowland	14	1	2	1	10	1	**2**	**2**	**1**	5	13	10	Ret	4	11	Ret		207	3rd
2025–26	Formula E Gen3 Evo	Nissan e-4ORCE 05	H			SAP	MEX	MIA	JED		MAD	BER		MCO		SAN	SHA		TKO		LDN		157	6th
2025–26	Formula E Gen3 Evo	Nissan e-4ORCE 05	H	1	(United Kingdom) Oliver Rowland	2	3	12	17	3	16	3	2	15	1	Ret	12	8	7	4	10	9	157	6th
2025–26	Formula E Gen3 Evo	Nissan e-4ORCE 05	H	23	(France) Norman Nato	Ret	10	17	13	17	11	18	5	14	Ret	Ret	20	17	16	6	15	10	157	6th

Notes

- ^{G} – Driver was fastest in group qualifying stage and was given one championship point.
- † – Driver did not finish the race, but was classified as he completed over 90% of the race distance.

=== Other teams supplied by Nissan ===
Year	Team	Chassis	Powertrain	Tyres	No.	Drivers	Points	T.C.
2022–23	(United Kingdom) NEOM McLaren Formula E Team	Spark Gen3	Nissan e-4ORCE 04	H	No.	Drivers	88	8th
2022–23	(United Kingdom) NEOM McLaren Formula E Team	Spark Gen3	Nissan e-4ORCE 04	H	5	(United Kingdom) Jake Hughes	88	8th
2022–23	(United Kingdom) NEOM McLaren Formula E Team	Spark Gen3	Nissan e-4ORCE 04	H	58	(Germany) René Rast	88	8th
2023–24	(United Kingdom) NEOM McLaren Formula E Team	Spark Gen3	Nissan e-4ORCE 04	H				
2023–24	(United Kingdom) NEOM McLaren Formula E Team	Spark Gen3	Nissan e-4ORCE 04	H	5	(United Kingdom) Jake Hughes	101	7th
2023–24	(United Kingdom) NEOM McLaren Formula E Team	Spark Gen3	Nissan e-4ORCE 04	H	8	(United Kingdom) Sam Bird	101	7th
2023–24	(United Kingdom) NEOM McLaren Formula E Team	Spark Gen3	Nissan e-4ORCE 04	H	8	(United Kingdom) Taylor Barnard	101	7th
2024–25	(United Kingdom) NEOM McLaren Formula E Team	Spark Gen3 Evo	Nissan e-4ORCE 05	H			101	7th
2024–25	(United Kingdom) NEOM McLaren Formula E Team	Spark Gen3 Evo	Nissan e-4ORCE 05	H	5	(United Kingdom) Taylor Barnard	143	6th
2024–25	(United Kingdom) NEOM McLaren Formula E Team	Spark Gen3 Evo	Nissan e-4ORCE 05	H	8	(United Kingdom) Sam Bird	143	6th
