= Monaco ePrix =

Electric motorsport race

- Circuit de Monaco (2022–present)

Race information
- Number of times held: 9
- First held: 2015
- Most wins (drivers): (Switzerland) Sébastien Buemi (3)
- Most wins (constructors): (France) e.Dams, (China) Techeetah-DS, (United Kingdom) Envision (Japan) Nissan (all 2)
- Circuit length: 3.337 km (2.074 miles)

Last race (2026)

Pole position
- (United Kingdom) Dan Ticktum; Cupra Kiro; 1:26.222

Podium
- 1. (United Kingdom) Oliver Rowland; Nissan; 45:43.102; 2. (Brazil) Felipe Drugovich; Andretti; +1.165; 3. (Portugal) António Félix da Costa; Jaguar TCS Racing; +3.448

Fastest lap
- (France) Jean-Éric Vergne; Citroën; 1:27:891

The Monaco ePrix is a recurring automobile race of the Formula E World Championship which takes place in Monte Carlo, Monaco.

== Circuit ==
On 18 September 2014 it was announced that Formula E would be racing on a shorter version of the original Monaco Grand Prix circuit for the 2014–15 season. This version misses out the hill, Casino square, the iconic hairpin, the famous tunnel and the chicane. However, since the 2020–21 season, the ePrix has been held on the traditional full-length Monaco circuit.

Monaco was not scheduled to be on the calendar for the second season of Formula E because it takes the slot on the calendar filled by the Historic Grand Prix at Monaco every other year. Series boss Alejandro Agag revealed that a race in Paris replaced the Monaco ePrix for 2016, but Monaco was held again in the 2016–17 season.

In 2020, virtual version of the track hosted the first ever Race At Home series due to travelling and restrictions around mass gatherings from 2020 Coronavirus pandemic. The race is a non-scoring preseason race. It then made a return on Round 3, where the damage level increased.

On 16 April 2021, it was announced that a new track layout would be used for 2021 Monaco ePrix, the layout was similar to the Formula One layout, just there would be differences on the T1 (Sainte Devote) and T9 (Nouvelle Chicane). This layout had length about 3.318 km (2.062 mi); the distance of layout was increased due to the increase in car performance and range of Gen2 cars. However, on the week of Monaco ePrix, it was decided to use T1 like the Formula One circuit in order to regenerate more energy by braking.

Since 2022, the Grand Prix layout has been used instead of the Formula E layout.

== Layout evolution ==
Track layouts
The shorter version of the Circuit de Monaco (2015, 2017, 2019)

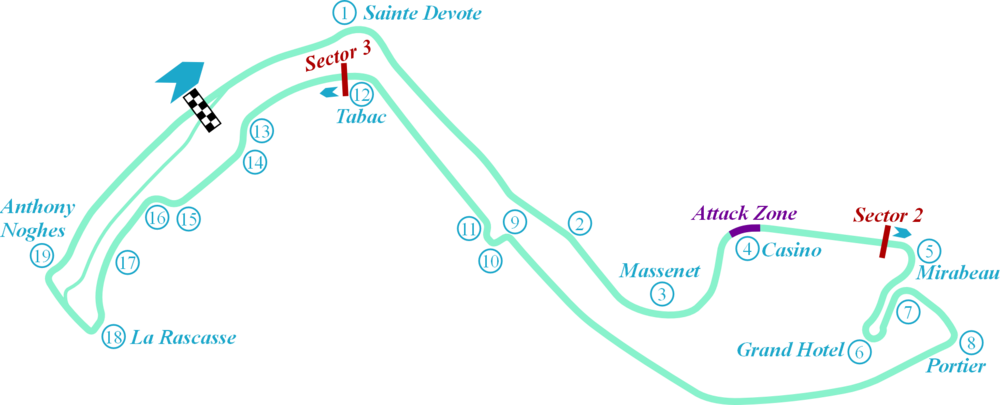
Specific Formula E layout of the Circuit de Monaco, in which the Nouvelle Chicane was a little bit different than the Grand Prix layout (2021)

The normal Grand Prix layout (2022–present)

== Results ==
| Edition | Track | Winner | Second | Third | Pole position | Fastest lap | Ref |
|---|---|---|---|---|---|---|---|
| 2015 | Circuit de Monaco | (Switzerland) Sébastien Buemi e.dams Renault | (Brazil) Lucas di Grassi; Abt Sportsline | (Brazil) Nelson Piquet Jr. China Racing | (Switzerland) Sébastien Buemi e.dams Renault | (France) Jean-Éric Vergne; Andretti Autosport | |
| 2017 | Circuit de Monaco | (Switzerland) Sébastien Buemi; Renault e.dams | (Brazil) Lucas Di Grassi; Abt Schaeffler Audi Sport | (Germany) Nick Heidfeld; Mahindra Racing | (Switzerland) Sébastien Buemi; Renault e.dams | (United Kingdom) Sam Bird; DS Virgin Racing | |
| 2019 | Circuit de Monaco | (France) Jean-Eric Vergne; Techeetah-DS | (United Kingdom) Oliver Rowland e.Dams-Nissan | (Brazil) Felipe Massa; Venturi | (United Kingdom) Oliver Rowland e.Dams-Nissan | (Germany) Pascal Wehrlein; Mahindra | |
| 2021 | Circuit de Monaco | (Portugal) António Félix da Costa; Techeetah-DS | (Netherlands) Robin Frijns; Virgin-Audi | (New Zealand) Mitch Evans; Jaguar | (Portugal) António Félix da Costa; Techeetah-DS | (Belgium) Stoffel Vandoorne; Mercedes | |
| 2022 | Circuit de Monaco | (Belgium) Stoffel Vandoorne; Mercedes | (New Zealand) Mitch Evans; Jaguar | (France) Jean-Eric Vergne; Techeetah-DS | (New Zealand) Mitch Evans; Jaguar | (Netherlands) Robin Frijns; Envision Racing | |
| 2023 | Circuit de Monaco | (New Zealand) Nick Cassidy; Envision Racing | (New Zealand) Mitch Evans; Jaguar | (United Kingdom) Jake Dennis; Andretti Autosport | (United Kingdom) Jake Hughes; McLaren | (United Kingdom) Jake Dennis; Andretti Autosport | |
| 2024 | Circuit de Monaco | (New Zealand) Mitch Evans Jaguar | (New Zealand) Nick Cassidy Jaguar | (Belgium) Stoffel Vandoorne DS Penske | (Germany) Pascal Wehrlein Porsche | (New Zealand) Nick Cassidy Jaguar | |
| 2025 Race 1 | Circuit de Monaco | (United Kingdom) Oliver Rowland Nissan | (Netherlands) Nyck de Vries Mahindra | (United Kingdom) Jake Dennis Andretti | (United Kingdom) Taylor Barnard McLaren | (New Zealand) Nick Cassidy Jaguar | |
| 2025 Race 2 | Circuit de Monaco | (Switzerland) Sébastien Buemi Envision | (United Kingdom) Oliver Rowland Nissan | (New Zealand) Nick Cassidy Jaguar | (United Kingdom) Oliver Rowland Nissan | (United Kingdom) Dan Ticktum Cupra Kiro | |
| 2026 Race 1 | Circuit de Monaco | (Netherlands) Nyck de Vries Mahindra | (New Zealand) Mitch Evans Jaguar | (Spain) Pepe Martí Cupra Kiro | (United Kingdom) Dan Ticktum Cupra Kiro | (Germany) Maximilian Günther DS Penske | |
| 2026 Race 2 | Circuit de Monaco | (United Kingdom) Oliver Rowland Nissan | (Brazil) Felipe Drugovich Andretti | (Portugal) António Félix da Costa Jaguar | (United Kingdom) Dan Ticktum Cupra Kiro | (France) Jean-Éric Vergne Citroën | |

=== Repeat winners (drivers) ===
| Wins | Driver | Years won |
|---|---|---|
| 3 | (Switzerland) Sébastien Buemi | 2015, 2017, 2025 (R2) |
| 2 | (United Kingdom) Oliver Rowland | 2025 (R1), 2026 (R2) |
