= 2026 Berlin ePrix =

Race 7 of 16 of the 2025–26 Formula E season
← Previous race	Next race →
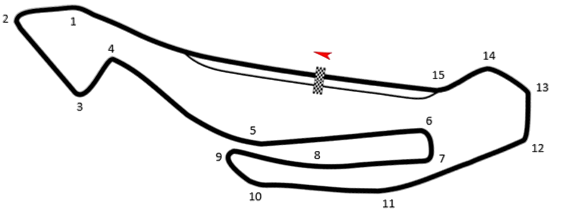

Race details
- Date: 2 May 2026
- Official name: 2026 Hankook Berlin E-Prix
- Location: Tempelhof Airport Street Circuit, Berlin
- Course: Street circuit
- Course length: 2.374 km (1.475 mi)
- Distance: 39 laps, 92.586 km (57.530 mi)

Pole position
Driver	(Switzerland) Edoardo Mortara	Mahindra
- Time: 56.986

Fastest lap
Driver	(Germany) Pascal Wehrlein	Porsche
- Time: 58.648

Podium
First	(Switzerland) Nico Müller	Porsche
Second	(New Zealand) Nick Cassidy	Citroën
Third	(United Kingdom) Oliver Rowland	Nissan

2026 Berlin ePrix
Race 8 of 17 of the 2025–26 Formula E season
← Previous race	Next race →
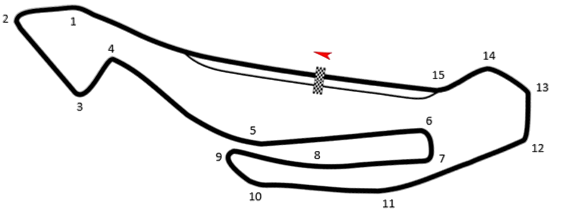

Race details
- Date: 3 May 2026
- Official name: 2026 Hankook Berlin E-Prix
- Location: Tempelhof Airport Street Circuit, Berlin
- Course: Street circuit
- Course length: 2.374 km (1.475 mi)
- Distance: 37 laps, 87.838 km (54.580 mi)

Pole position
Driver	(Germany) Pascal Wehrlein	Porsche
- Time: 57.292

Fastest lap
Driver	(United Kingdom) Oliver Rowland	Nissan
- Time: 59.130

Podium
First	(New Zealand) Mitch Evans	Jaguar
Second	(United Kingdom) Oliver Rowland	Nissan
Third	(Germany) Pascal Wehrlein	Porsche

The 2026 Berlin ePrix, known for sponsorship reasons as the 2026 Hankook Berlin E-Prix, was a pair of Formula E electric car races held at the Tempelhof Airport Street Circuit at Tempelhof Airport in the outskirts of Berlin, Germany on 2 and 3 May 2026. It served as the 7th and 8th rounds of the 2025–26 Formula E season, and marked the 12th edition of the Berlin ePrix, the only event to have featured in every season of the Formula E championship.

== Background ==
Pascal Wehrlein leads into Berlin with 83 points and a 3-point lead over Edoardo Mortara. Followed by Mitch Evans and António Félix da Costa.

== Classification ==
All times are in CEST.

=== Race one ===
==== Qualification ====
Qualification took place at 11:40 AM on 2 May.

Group draw
Group A	(Germany) WEH	(New Zealand) EVA	(New Zealand) CAS	(United Kingdom) ROW	(Switzerland) BUE	(Sweden) ERI	(United Kingdom) BAR	(France) JEV	(France) NAT	(Brazil) DRU
Group B	(Switzerland) MOR	(Portugal) DAC	(Switzerland) MUE	(United Kingdom) DEN	(United Kingdom) TIC	(Spain) MAR	(Netherlands) DEV	(Germany) GUE	(Barbados) MAL	(Brazil) DIG

===== Qualifying duels =====
Quarter-finals
A2	(Brazil) Felipe Drugovich
A3	(United Kingdom) Oliver Rowland
A1	(Germany) Pascal Wehrlein
A4	(New Zealand) Nick Cassidy
B2	(Switzerland) Edoardo Mortara
B3	(Barbados) Zane Maloney
B1	(United Kingdom) Dan Ticktum
B4	(Switzerland) Nico Müller

Semi-finals
(United Kingdom) Oliver Rowland
(Germany) Pascal Wehrlein
(Switzerland) Edoardo Mortara
(United Kingdom) Dan Ticktum

Final
(Germany) Pascal Wehrlein
(Switzerland) Edoardo Mortara

==== Overall classification ====
Pos.	No.	Driver	Team	A	B	QF	SF	F	Grid
1	48	(Switzerland) Edoardo Mortara	Mahindra	—N/a	58.420	56.887	57.002	56.986	1
2	94	(Germany) Pascal Wehrlein	Porsche	58.369	—N/a	57.374	56.996	57.142	2
3	1	(United Kingdom) Oliver Rowland	Nissan	58.764	—N/a	57.350	57.112	—N/a	3
4	33	(United Kingdom) Dan Ticktum	Cupra Kiro-Porsche	—N/a	58.337	57.148	57.351	—N/a	4
5	37	(New Zealand) Nick Cassidy	Citroën	58.768	—N/a	57.449	—N/a	—N/a	5
6	51	(Switzerland) Nico Müller	Porsche	—N/a	58.590	57.553	—N/a	—N/a	6
7	22	(Barbados) Zane Maloney	Lola Yamaha ABT	—N/a	58.542	57.647	—N/a	—N/a	7
8	28	(Brazil) Felipe Drugovich	Andretti-Porsche	58.647	—N/a	57.892	—N/a	—N/a	8
9	13	(Portugal) António Félix da Costa	Jaguar	—N/a	58.614	—N/a	—N/a	—N/a	9
10	77	(United Kingdom) Taylor Barnard	DS Penske	58.778	—N/a	—N/a	—N/a	—N/a	10
11	7	(Germany) Maximilian Günther	DS Penske	—N/a	58.638	—N/a	—N/a	—N/a	11
12	14	(Sweden) Joel Eriksson	Envision-Jaguar	58.779	—N/a	—N/a	—N/a	—N/a	12
13	27	(United Kingdom) Jake Dennis	Andretti-Porsche	—N/a	58.654	—N/a	—N/a	—N/a	13
14	9	(New Zealand) Mitch Evans	Jaguar	58.787	—N/a	—N/a	—N/a	—N/a	14
15	3	(Spain) Pepe Martí	Cupra Kiro-Porsche	—N/a	58.748	—N/a	—N/a	—N/a	15
16	25	(France) Jean-Éric Vergne	Citroën	58.813	—N/a	—N/a	—N/a	—N/a	16
17	21	(Netherlands) Nyck de Vries	Mahindra	—N/a	58.842	—N/a	—N/a	—N/a	17
18	16	(Switzerland) Sébastien Buemi	Envision-Jaguar	58.986	—N/a	—N/a	—N/a	—N/a	18
19	11	(Brazil) Lucas di Grassi	Lola Yamaha ABT	—N/a	1:03.166	—N/a	—N/a	—N/a	19
20	23	(France) Norman Nato	Nissan	59.010	—N/a	—N/a	—N/a	—N/a	20

=== Race ===
The race started at 4:05pm on 2 May.

Pos.	No.	Driver	Team	Laps	Time/Retired	Grid	Points
1	51	(Switzerland) Nico Müller	Porsche	39	41:37.851	6	25
2	37	(New Zealand) Nick Cassidy	Citroën	39	+4.798	5	18
3	1	(United Kingdom) Oliver Rowland	Nissan	39	+5.252	3	15
4	48	(Switzerland) Edoardo Mortara	Mahindra	39	+5.898	1	12+3^{1}
5	27	(United Kingdom) Jake Dennis	Andretti-Porsche	39	+8.117	13	10+1^{2}
6	9	(New Zealand) Mitch Evans	Jaguar	39	+8.917	14	8
7	3	(Spain) Pepe Martí	Cupra Kiro-Porsche	39	+10.142	15	6
8	77	(United Kingdom) Taylor Barnard	DS Penske	39	+10.529	10	4
9	21	(Netherlands) Nyck de Vries	Mahindra	39	+11.141	17	2
10	13	(Portugal) António Félix da Costa	Jaguar	39	+13.051	9	1
11	7	(Germany) Maximilian Günther	DS Penske	39	+13.836	11	
12	16	(Switzerland) Sébastien Buemi	Envision-Jaguar	39	+14.336	18	
13	28	(Brazil) Felipe Drugovich	Andretti-Porsche	39	+14.596	8	
14	25	(France) Jean-Éric Vergne	Citroën	39	+14.889	16	
15	22	(Barbados) Zane Maloney	Lola Yamaha ABT	39	+15.178	7	
16	14	(Sweden) Joel Eriksson	Envision-Jaguar	39	+16.046	12	
17	11	(Brazil) Lucas di Grassi	Lola Yamaha ABT	39	+17.195	19	
18	23	(France) Norman Nato	Nissan	39	+18.138	20	
19	94	(Germany) Pascal Wehrlein	Porsche	39	+49.648	2	
Ret	33	(United Kingdom) Dan Ticktum	Cupra Kiro-Porsche	38		4	

Notes:

- ^1 – Pole position.
- ^2 – Fastest lap.

=== Standings after the race ===
Drivers' Championship standings

	Pos	Driver	Points
1	1	(Switzerland) Edoardo Mortara	87
1	2	(Germany) Pascal Wehrlein	83
4	3	(Switzerland) Nico Müller	75
1	4	(New Zealand) Mitch Evans	73
	5	(New Zealand) Nick Cassidy	69

Teams' Championship standings

	Pos	Team	Points
	1	(Germany) Porsche	158
	2	(United Kingdom) Jaguar	138
	3	(India) Mahindra	101
1	4	(France) Citroën	79
1	5	(Japan) Nissan	65

Manufacturers' Championship standings

Pos	Manufacturer	Points
1	(Germany) Porsche	205
2	(United Kingdom) Jaguar	177
3	(Netherlands) Stellantis	117
4	(India) Mahindra	96
5	(Japan) Nissan	88

- Notes: Only the top five positions are included for all three sets of standings.

=== Race two ===
==== Qualification ====
Qualification took place at 11:40 AM on 3 May.

Group draw
Group A	(Switzerland) MOR	(Switzerland) MUE	(New Zealand) CAS	(United Kingdom) ROW	(Switzerland) BUE	(United Kingdom) TIC	(United Kingdom) BAR	(France) JEV	(France) NAT	(Brazil) DRU
Group B	(Germany) WEH	(New Zealand) EVA	(Portugal) DAC	(United Kingdom) DEN	(Spain) MAR	(Sweden) ERI	(Netherlands) DEV	(Germany) GUE	(Barbados) MAL	(Brazil) DIG

===== Qualifying duels =====
Quarter-finals
A2	(United Kingdom) Taylor Barnard
A3	(Brazil) Felipe Drugovich
A1	(New Zealand) Nick Cassidy
A4	(France) Jean-Éric Vergne
B2	(Sweden) Joel Eriksson
B3	(Barbados) Zane Maloney
B1	(Portugal) António Félix da Costa
B4	(Germany) Pascal Wehrlein

Semi-finals
(United Kingdom) Taylor Barnard
(New Zealand) Nick Cassidy
(Sweden) Joel Eriksson
(Germany) Pascal Wehrlein

Final
(United Kingdom) Taylor Barnard
(Germany) Pascal Wehrlein

===== Overall classification =====
Pos.	No.	Driver	Team	A	B	QF	SF	F	Grid
1	1	(Germany) Pascal Wehrlein	Porsche	—N/a	58.591	57.373	57.296	57.292	1
2	77	(United Kingdom) Taylor Barnard	DS Penske	58.466	—N/a	57.235	57.326	57.330	2
3	37	(New Zealand) Nick Cassidy	Citroën	58.440	—N/a	57.217	57.487	—N/a	3
4	14	(Sweden) Joel Eriksson	Envision-Jaguar	—N/a	58.565	57.290	57.843	—N/a	4
5	25	(France) Jean-Éric Vergne	Citroën	58.570	—N/a	57.330	—N/a	—N/a	5
6	22	(Barbados) Zane Maloney	Lola Yamaha ABT	—N/a	58.585	57.430	—N/a	—N/a	6
7	28	(Brazil) Felipe Drugovich	Andretti-Porsche	—N/a	58.493	57.648	—N/a	—N/a	7
8	13	(Portugal) António Félix da Costa	Jaguar	58.439	—N/a	57.701	—N/a	—N/a	8
9	21	(Netherlands) Nyck de Vries	Mahindra	—N/a	58.605	—N/a	—N/a	—N/a	9
10	48	(Switzerland) Edoardo Mortara	Mahindra	58.592	—N/a	—N/a	—N/a	—N/a	10
11	7	(Germany) Maximilian Günther	DS Penske	—N/a	58.696	—N/a	—N/a	—N/a	11
12	51	(Switzerland) Nico Müller	Porsche	58.599	—N/a	—N/a	—N/a	—N/a	12
13	27	(United Kingdom) Jake Dennis	Andretti-Porsche	—N/a	58.706	—N/a	—N/a	—N/a	13
14	16	(Switzerland) Sébastien Buemi	Envision-Jaguar	58.656	—N/a	—N/a	—N/a	—N/a	14
15	11	(Brazil) Lucas di Grassi	Lola Yamaha ABT	—N/a	58.846	—N/a	—N/a	—N/a	15
16	23	(France) Norman Nato	Nissan	58.752	—N/a	—N/a	—N/a	—N/a	16
17	9	(New Zealand) Mitch Evans	Jaguar	—N/a	59.281	—N/a	—N/a	—N/a	17
18	1	(United Kingdom) Oliver Rowland	Nissan	59.408	—N/a	—N/a	—N/a	—N/a	18
19	3	(Spain) Pepe Martí	Cupra Kiro-Porsche	—N/a	1:02.251	—N/a	—N/a	—N/a	19
20	33	(United Kingdom) Dan Ticktum	Cupra Kiro-Porsche	1:00.851	—N/a	—N/a	—N/a	—N/a	20

==== Race ====
The race took place on 3 may at 4:05 PM.

Pos.	No.	Driver	Team	Laps	Time/Retired	Grid	Points
1	9	(New Zealand) Mitch Evans	Jaguar	37	39:50.663	17	25
2	1	(United Kingdom) Oliver Rowland	Nissan	37	+0.822	18	18+1^{2}
3	94	(Germany) Pascal Wehrlein	Porsche	37	+1.111	1	15+3^{1}
4	16	(Switzerland) Sébastien Buemi	Envision-Jaguar	37	+1.639	13	12
5	23	(France) Norman Nato	Nissan	37	+4.424	16	10
6	27	(United Kingdom) Jake Dennis	Andretti-Porsche	37	+5.940	12	8
7	48	(Switzerland) Edoardo Mortara	Mahindra	37	+6.325	10	6
8	25	(France) Jean-Éric Vergne	Citroën	37	+7.604	5	4
9	28	(Brazil) Felipe Drugovich	Andretti-Porsche	37	+8.491	7	2
10	14	(Sweden) Joel Eriksson	Envision-Jaguar	37	+8.965	4	1
11	77	(United Kingdom) Taylor Barnard	DS Penske	37	+10.216	11	
12	2	(Spain) Pepe Martí	Cupra Kiro-Porsche	37	+11.712	19	
13	51	(Switzerland) Nico Müller	Porsche	37	+12.747	11	
14	33	(United Kingdom) Dan Ticktum	Cupra Kiro-Porsche	37	+13.212	20	
15	7	(Germany) Maximilian Günther	DS Penske	37	+14.774	14	
16	11	(Brazil) Lucas di Grassi	Lola Yamaha ABT	37	+14.873	15	
17	22	(Barbados) Zane Maloney	Lola Yamaha ABT	37	+15.372	6	
18	13	(Portugal) António Félix da Costa	Jaguar	37	+36.559	8	
Ret	37	(New Zealand) Nick Cassidy	Citroën	35		3	
Ret	21	(Netherlands) Nyck de Vries	Mahindra	3		9	

Notes:

- ^1 – Pole position.
- ^2 – Fastest lap.

=== Standings after the race ===
Drivers' Championship standings

	Pos	Driver	Points
1	1	(Germany) Pascal Wehrlein	101
2	2	(New Zealand) Mitch Evans	98
2	3	(Switzerland) Edoardo Mortara	93
3	4	(United Kingdom) Oliver Rowland	83
2	5	(Switzerland) Nico Müller	75

Teams' Championship standings

	Pos	Team	Points
	1	(Germany) Porsche	176
	2	(United Kingdom) Jaguar	163
	3	(India) Mahindra	107
1	4	(Japan) Nissan	94
1	5	(France) Citroën	83

Manufacturers' Championship standings

	Pos	Manufacturer	Points
	1	(Germany) Porsche	228
	2	(United Kingdom) Jaguar	214
	3	(Netherlands) Stellantis	123
1	4	(Japan) Nissan	116
1	5	(India) Mahindra	102

- Notes: Only the top five positions are included for all three sets of standings.

== Notes ==
Previous race: 2026 Madrid ePrix	FIA Formula E World Championship; 2025–26 season	Next race: 2026 Monaco ePrix
Previous race: 2025 Berlin ePrix	Berlin ePrix	Next race: 2027 Berlin ePrix
