= 2026 Monaco ePrix =

Race 9 of 17 of the 2025–26 Formula E season
← Previous race	Next race →

Race details
- Date: 16 May 2026
- Location: Circuit de Monaco, Monte Carlo, Monaco
- Course: Street Circuit
- Course length: 3.337 km (2.074 mi)
- Distance: 29 laps, 96.773 km (60.132 mi)

Pole position
Driver	(United Kingdom) Dan Ticktum	Cupra Kiro-Porsche
- Time: 1:26.551

Fastest lap
Driver	(Germany) Maximilian Günther	DS Penske
- Time: 1:28.427

Podium
First	(Netherlands) Nyck de Vries	Mahindra
Second	(New Zealand) Mitch Evans	Jaguar
Third	(Spain) Pepe Martí	Cupra Kiro-Porsche

2026 Monaco ePrix
Race 10 of 17 of the 2025–26 Formula E season
← Previous race	Next race →

Race details
- Date: 17 May 2026
- Location: Circuit de Monaco, Monte Carlo, Monaco
- Course: Street Circuit
- Course length: 3.337 km (2.074 mi)
- Distance: 28 laps, 93.436 km (58.058 mi)

Pole position
Driver	(United Kingdom) Dan Ticktum	Cupra Kiro-Porsche
- Time: 1:26.222

Fastest lap
Driver	(France) Jean-Éric Vergne	Citroën
- Time: 1:27:891

Podium
First	(United Kingdom) Oliver Rowland	Nissan
Second	(Brazil) Felipe Drugovich	Andretti-Porsche
Third	(Portugal) António Félix da Costa	Jaguar

The 2026 Monaco ePrix was a Formula E electric car race held at the Circuit de Monaco in Monte Carlo, Monaco on 16–17 May 2026. It was the 9th edition of the Monaco ePrix and served as the ninth and tenth round of the 2025–26 Formula E World Championship.

== Background ==
Pascal Wehrlein entered the weekend in the lead of the championship with 101 points, 3 points ahead of Mitch Evans and 8 points ahead of Edoardo Mortara in third.

Porsche entered the weekend in the lead of the Teams' Championship on 176 points, with a 13-point lead over Jaguar and a 69-point lead ahead of Mahindra. Porsche lead the Manufacturers' Trophy with 228 points, 14 ahead of Jaguar and 95 ahead of Stellantis.

== Classification ==
All times are in CEST.

=== Race 1 ===
==== Qualifying ====
Qualifying started at 10:40 AM on 16 May 2026.

Group draw
Group A	(Germany) WEH	(Switzerland) MOR	(Switzerland) MUE	(United Kingdom) DEN	(Switzerland) BUE	(United Kingdom) TIC	(United Kingdom) BAR	(France) JEV	(Germany) GUE	(Barbados) MAL
Group B	(New Zealand) EVA	(United Kingdom) ROW	(New Zealand) CAS	(Portugal) DAC	(Spain) MAR	(Sweden) ERI	(Netherlands) DEV	(France) NAT	(Brazil) DRU	(Brazil) DIG

===== Qualifying duels =====
Quarter-finals
A2	(Germany) Maximilian Günther
A3	(Switzerland) Nico Müller
A1	(Germany) Pascal Wehrlein
A4	(United Kingdom) Dan Ticktum
B2	(Netherlands) Nyck de Vries
B3	(Portugal) António Félix da Costa
B1	(New Zealand) Mitch Evans
B4	(Sweden) Joel Eriksson

Semi-finals
(Germany) Maximilian Günther
(United Kingdom) Dan Ticktum
(Netherlands) Nyck de Vries
(New Zealand) Mitch Evans

Final
(United Kingdom) Dan Ticktum
(Netherlands) Nyck de Vries

==== Overall classification ====
Pos.	No.	Driver	Team	A	B	QF	SF	F	Grid
1	33	(United Kingdom) Dan Ticktum	Cupra Kiro-Porsche	1:28.892	—N/a	1:26.667	1:26.813	1:26.551	1
2	21	(Netherlands) Nyck de Vries	Mahindra	—N/a	1:28.799	1:26.754	1:26.745	1:26.682	2
3	7	(Germany) Maximilian Günther	DS Penske	1:28.860	—N/a	1:26.763	1:26.967	—N/a	3
4	9	(New Zealand) Mitch Evans	Jaguar	—N/a	1:28.761	1:26.854	1:27.003	—N/a	4
5	94	(Germany) Pascal Wehrlein	Porsche	1:28.832	—N/a	1:26.922	—N/a	—N/a	5
6	51	(Switzerland) Nico Müller	Porsche	1:28.886	—N/a	1:26.951	—N/a	—N/a	6
7	14	(Sweden) Joel Eriksson	Envision-Jaguar	—N/a	1:28.953	1:27.061	—N/a	—N/a	7
8	13	(Portugal) António Félix da Costa	Jaguar	—N/a	1:28.925	1:27.777	—N/a	—N/a	8
9	25	(France) Jean-Éric Vergne	Citroën	1:29.041	—N/a	—N/a	—N/a	—N/a	9
10	28	(Brazil) Felipe Drugovich	Andretti-Porsche	—N/a	1:29.054	—N/a	—N/a	—N/a	10
11	77	(United Kingdom) Taylor Barnard	DS Penske	1:29.059	—N/a	—N/a	—N/a	—N/a	11
12	1	(United Kingdom) Oliver Rowland	Nissan	—N/a	1:29.091	—N/a	—N/a	—N/a	12
13	27	(United Kingdom) Jake Dennis	Andretti-Porsche	1:29.257	—N/a	—N/a	—N/a	—N/a	13
14	23	(France) Norman Nato	Nissan	—N/a	1:29.253	—N/a	—N/a	—N/a	14
15	16	(Switzerland) Sébastien Buemi	Envision-Jaguar	1:29.310	—N/a	—N/a	—N/a	—N/a	15
16	3	(Spain) Pepe Martí	Cupra Kiro-Porsche	—N/a	1:29.265	—N/a	—N/a	—N/a	16
17	37	(New Zealand) Nick Cassidy	Citroën	—N/a	1:29.576	—N/a	—N/a	—N/a	17
18	11	(Brazil) Lucas di Grassi	Lola Yamaha ABT	—N/a	1:29.850	—N/a	—N/a	—N/a	18
19	48	(Switzerland) Edoardo Mortara	Mahindra	No time	—N/a	—N/a	—N/a	—N/a	19
20	22	(Barbados) Zane Maloney	Lola Yamaha ABT	No time	—N/a	—N/a	—N/a	—N/a	20

==== Race ====
The race started at 3:05 PM on 16 May 2026.

Pos.	No.	Driver	Team	Laps	Time/Retired	Grid	Points
1	21	(Netherlands) Nyck de Vries	Mahindra	29	51:26.313	2	25
2	9	(New Zealand) Mitch Evans	Jaguar	29	+2.677	4	18
3	3	(Spain) Pepe Martí	Cupra Kiro-Porsche	29	+21.115	15	15
4	28	(Brazil) Felipe Drugovich	Andretti-Porsche	29	+21.320	10	12
5	16	(Switzerland) Sébastien Buemi	Envision-Jaguar	29	+21.839	18	10
6	14	(Sweden) Joel Eriksson	Envision-Jaguar	29	+23.990	7	8
7	77	(United Kingdom) Taylor Barnard	DS Penske	29	+24.322	11	6
8	11	(Brazil) Lucas di Grassi	Lola Yamaha ABT	29	+27.019	17	4
9	37	(New Zealand) Nick Cassidy	Citroën	29	+29.004	16	2
10	7	(Germany) Maximilian Günther	DS Penske	29	+29.817 (Note: Maximilian Günther finished ninth and was promoted to eighth following Dan Ticktum's penalty, but received a post-race five-second time penalty for causing a collision with Nico Müller.)	3	1+1^{2}
11	51	(Switzerland) Nico Müller	Porsche	29	+35.817 (Note: Nico Müller finished tenth and was promoted to ninth following Dan Ticktum's penalty, but received two post-race five-second time penalties for causing collisions with Pascal Wehrlein and Edoardo Mortara, respectively.)	6	
12	33	(United Kingdom) Dan Ticktum	Cupra Kiro-Porsche	29	+45.641 (Note: Dan Ticktum finished third, but received a drive-through penalty converted to 33-second time penalty for causing a collision with Antonio Felix da Costa.)	1	3^{1}
13	22	(Barbados) Zane Maloney	Lola Yamaha ABT	29	+52.893	20	
14	23	(France) Norman Nato	Nissan	29	+1:02.680	14	
15	1	(United Kingdom) Oliver Rowland	Nissan	29	+1:22.065	12	
16	25	(France) Jean-Éric Vergne	Citroën	29	+1 lap	9	
17	48	(Switzerland) Edoardo Mortara	Mahindra	28	+1 lap	19	
18	94	(Germany) Pascal Wehrlein	Porsche	28	+1 lap	5	
Ret	13	(Portugal) António Félix da Costa	Jaguar	27	Collision	8	
Ret	27	(United Kingdom) Jake Dennis	Andretti-Porsche	4	Collision	13	

Notes:

- ^1 – Pole position.
- ^2 – Fastest lap.

==== Standings after the race ====
Drivers' Championship standings

	Pos	Driver	Points
1	1	(New Zealand) Mitch Evans	116
1	2	(Germany) Pascal Wehrlein	101
	3	(Switzerland) Edoardo Mortara	93
	4	(United Kingdom) Oliver Rowland	83
	5	(Switzerland) Nico Müller	75

Teams' Championship standings

	Pos	Team	Points
1	1	(United Kingdom) Jaguar	181
1	2	(Germany) Porsche	176
	3	(India) Mahindra	132
	4	(Japan) Nissan	94
1	5	(United Kingdom) Envision	93

Manufacturers' Championship standings

	Pos	Manufacturer	Points
	1	(Germany) Porsche	255
	2	(United Kingdom) Jaguar	242
	3	(Netherlands) Stellantis	135
1	4	(India) Mahindra	127
1	5	(Japan) Nissan	117

- Notes: Only the top five positions are included for all three sets of standings.

=== Race 2 ===
==== Qualifying ====
Qualifying started at 10:40 AM on 17 May 2026.

Group draw
Group A	(New Zealand) EVA	(Switzerland) MOR	(Switzerland) MUE	(United Kingdom) DEN	(Switzerland) BUE	(Netherlands) DEV	(United Kingdom) TIC	(Brazil) DRU	(France) NAT	(Brazil) DIG
Group B	(Germany) WEH	(United Kingdom) ROW	(New Zealand) CAS	(Portugal) DAC	(Spain) MAR	(Sweden) ERI	(United Kingdom) BAR	(France) JEV	(Germany) GUE	(Barbados) MAL

===== Qualifying duels =====
Quarter-finals
A2	(Switzerland) Edoardo Mortara
A3	(New Zealand) Mitch Evans
A1	(United Kingdom) Dan Ticktum
A4	(Brazil) Felipe Drugovich
B2	(United Kingdom) Oliver Rowland
B3	(France) Jean-Éric Vergne
B1	(United Kingdom) Taylor Barnard
B4	(Portugal) António Félix da Costa

Semi-finals
(Switzerland) Edoardo Mortara
(United Kingdom) Dan Ticktum
(France) Jean-Éric Vergne
(Portugal) António Félix da Costa

Final
(United Kingdom) Dan Ticktum
(Portugal) António Félix da Costa

==== Overall classification ====
Pos.	No.	Driver	Team	A	B	QF	SF	F	Grid
1	33	(United Kingdom) Dan Ticktum	Cupra Kiro-Porsche	1:28.492	—N/a	1:26.478	1:26.217	1:26.222	1
2	13	(Portugal) António Félix da Costa	Jaguar	—N/a	1:28.804	1:26.732	1:26.581	1:26.898	2
3	48	(Switzerland) Edoardo Mortara	Mahindra	1:28.597	—N/a	1:26.547	1:26.414	—N/a	3
4	25	(France) Jean-Éric Vergne	Citroën	—N/a	1:28.775	1:26.661	1:26.596	—N/a	4
5	28	(Brazil) Felipe Drugovich	Andretti-Porsche	1:28.673	—N/a	1:26.620	—N/a	—N/a	5
6	77	(United Kingdom) Taylor Barnard	DS Penske	—N/a	1:28.545	1:26.733	—N/a	—N/a	6
7	9	(New Zealand) Mitch Evans	Jaguar	1:28.662	—N/a	1:26.768	—N/a	—N/a	7
8	1	(United Kingdom) Oliver Rowland	Nissan	—N/a	1:28.765	1:26.906	—N/a	—N/a	8
9	23	(France) Norman Nato	Nissan	1:28.690	—N/a	—N/a	—N/a	—N/a	9
10	3	(Spain) Pepe Martí	Cupra Kiro-Porsche	—N/a	1:28.832	—N/a	—N/a	—N/a	10
11	51	(Switzerland) Nico Müller	Porsche	1:28.742	—N/a	—N/a	—N/a	—N/a	11
12	7	(Germany) Maximilian Günther	DS Penske	—N/a	1:28.872	—N/a	—N/a	—N/a	12
13	27	(United Kingdom) Jake Dennis	Andretti-Porsche	1:28.821	—N/a	—N/a	—N/a	—N/a	13
14	94	(Germany) Pascal Wehrlein	Porsche	—N/a	1:28.888	—N/a	—N/a	—N/a	14
15	21	(Netherlands) Nyck de Vries	Mahindra	1:28.894	—N/a	—N/a	—N/a	—N/a	15
16	14	(Sweden) Joel Eriksson	Envision-Jaguar	—N/a	1:28.970	—N/a	—N/a	—N/a	16
17	16	(Switzerland) Sébastien Buemi	Envision-Jaguar	1:29.075	—N/a	—N/a	—N/a	—N/a	17
18	37	(New Zealand) Nick Cassidy	Citroën	—N/a	1:29.010	—N/a	—N/a	—N/a	18
19	11	(Brazil) Lucas di Grassi	Lola Yamaha ABT	1:29.663	—N/a	—N/a	—N/a	—N/a	19
20	22	(Barbados) Zane Maloney	Lola Yamaha ABT	—N/a	1:29.303	—N/a	—N/a	—N/a	20

==== Race ====
The race started at 3:05 PM on 17 May 2026.

Pos.	No.	Driver	Team	Laps	Time/Retired	Grid	Points
1	1	(United Kingdom) Oliver Rowland	Nissan	29	45:43.102	8	25+1^{2}
2	28	(Brazil) Felipe Drugovich	Andretti-Porsche	29	+1.165	5	18
3	13	(Portugal) António Félix da Costa	Jaguar	29	+3.448	2	15
4	9	(New Zealand) Mitch Evans	Jaguar	29	+10.442	7	12
5	48	(Switzerland) Edoardo Mortara	Mahindra	29	+10.891 (Note: Edoardo Mortara finished second, but received a ten-second time penalty for causing a collision with António Félix da Costa.)	3	10
6	51	(Switzerland) Nico Müller	Porsche	29	+18.073	11	8
7	14	(Sweden) Joel Eriksson	Envision-Jaguar	29	+18.380	16	6
8	21	(Netherlands) Nyck de Vries	Mahindra	29	+18.950	15	4
9	11	(Brazil) Lucas di Grassi	Lola Yamaha ABT	29	+19.622	19	2
10	22	(Barbados) Zane Maloney	Lola Yamaha ABT	29	+19.895	20	1
11	94	(Germany) Pascal Wehrlein	Porsche	29	+21.119	14	
12	27	(United Kingdom) Jake Dennis	Andretti-Porsche	29	+22.854 (Note: Jake Dennis finished sixth, but received a post-race five-second time penalty for causing a collision with Dan Ticktum.)	13	
13	7	(Germany) Maximilian Günther	DS Penske	29	+24.160 (Note: Maximilian Günther finished ninth, but received a five-second time penalty for causing a collision with Sébastien Buemi.)	12	
14	33	(United Kingdom) Dan Ticktum	Cupra Kiro-Porsche	29	+41.244	1	3^{1}
15	77	(United Kingdom) Taylor Barnard	DS Penske	29	+45.359	6	
16	25	(France) Jean-Éric Vergne	Citroën	29	+54.175	4	
17	16	(Switzerland) Sébastien Buemi	Envision-Jaguar	28	+1:06.715	17	
18	37	(New Zealand) Nick Cassidy	Citroën	28	+1:08.041	18	
Ret	3	(Spain) Pepe Martí	Cupra Kiro-Porsche	18		10	
Ret	23	(France) Norman Nato	Nissan	6	Collision	9	

Notes:

- ^1 – Pole position.
- ^2 – Fastest lap.

==== Standings after the race ====
Drivers' Championship standings

	Pos	Driver	Points
	1	(New Zealand) Mitch Evans	128
1	2	(United Kingdom) Oliver Rowland	109
	3	(Switzerland) Edoardo Mortara	103
2	4	(Germany) Pascal Wehrlein	101
	5	(Switzerland) Nico Müller	83

Teams' Championship standings

Pos	Team	Points
1	(United Kingdom) Jaguar	208
2	(Germany) Porsche	184
3	(India) Mahindra	146
4	(Japan) Nissan	120
5	(United Kingdom) Envision	99

Manufacturers' Championship standings

	Pos	Manufacturer	Points
	1	(Germany) Porsche	281
	2	(United Kingdom) Jaguar	269
1	3	(India) Mahindra	143
1	4	(Japan) Nissan	142
2	5	(Netherlands) Stellantis	136

- Notes: Only the top five positions are included for all three sets of standings.

== Notes ==
Previous race: 2026 Berlin ePrix	FIA Formula E World Championship; 2025–26 season	Next race: 2026 Sanya ePrix
Previous race: 2025 Monaco ePrix	Monaco ePrix	Next race: 2027 Monaco ePrix
