= 2026 Sanya ePrix =

Race 11 of 17 of the 2025–26 Formula E season
← Previous race	Next race →
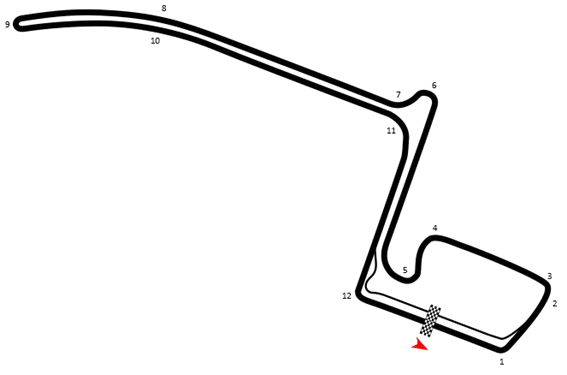

Race details
- Date: 20 June 2026
- Official name: 2026 Lianxin Sanya E-Prix
- Location: Sanya Street Circuit, Sanya
- Course: Street circuit
- Course length: 2.520 km (1.566 mi)

Pole position
Driver	(United Kingdom) Jake Dennis	Andretti-Porsche
- Time: 1:05.502

Fastest lap
Driver	(Netherlands) Nyck de Vries	Mahindra
- Time: 1:08.455

Podium
First	(United Kingdom) Jake Dennis	Andretti-Porsche
Second	(Spain) Pepe Martí	Cupra Kiro-Porsche
Third	(Netherlands) Nyck de Vries	Mahindra

The 2026 Sanya ePrix (formally the 2026 Lianxin Sanya E-Prix) was a Formula E electric motor race held in Sanya on the Chinese island of Hainan on 20 June 2026. It was the 11th race of the 2025–26 Formula E season, and the second Sanya ePrix.

== Background ==
Modifications were made to the original Haitang Bay Circuit, with the track extended to 2.520 km (1.566 mi) in length.

Going into the race, Mitch Evans led the championship with 128 points, 19 points over Oliver Rowland and 25 points over Edoardo Mortara. In the teams championship, Jaguar TCS Racing led with 208 points, Porsche Formula E Team was in second place with 184 points, Mahindra Racing was in third place with 146 points.

== Classification ==
All times are in UTC+8.

=== Qualifying ===
Qualifying started at 10:40 AM on 20 June 2026.

Group draw
Group A	(New Zealand) EVA	(Switzerland) MOR	(Switzerland) MUE	(New Zealand) CAS	(Switzerland) BUE	(Spain) MAR	(Brazil) DRU	(United Kingdom) BAR	(France) NAT	(Brazil) DIG
Group B	(United Kingdom) ROW	(Germany) WEH	(Portugal) DAC	(United Kingdom) DEN	(Netherlands) DEV	(Sweden) ERI	(United Kingdom) TIC	(France) JEV	(Germany) GUE	(Barbados) MAL

==== Qualifying duels ====
Quarter-finals
A2	(New Zealand) Mitch Evans
A3	(United Kingdom) Taylor Barnard
A1	(Brazil) Felipe Drugovich
A4	(New Zealand) Nick Cassidy
B2	(United Kingdom) Dan Ticktum
B3	(Netherlands) Nyck de Vries
B1	(United Kingdom) Jake Dennis
B4	(Germany) Pascal Wehrlein

Semi-finals
(New Zealand) Mitch Evans
(Brazil) Felipe Drugovich
(United Kingdom) Dan Ticktum
(United Kingdom) Jake Dennis

Final
(Brazil) Felipe Drugovich
(United Kingdom) Jake Dennis

==== Overall classification ====
Pos.	No.	Driver	Team	A	B	QF	SF	F	Grid
1	27	(United Kingdom) Jake Dennis	Andretti-Porsche	—N/a	1:07:579	1:05:621	1:05:425	1:05:502	1
2	28	(Brazil) Felipe Drugovich	Andretti-Porsche	1:07:337	—N/a	1:05:571	1:05:607	1:06:580	2
3	9	(New Zealand) Mitch Evans	Jaguar	1:07:504	—N/a	1:05:652	1:05:632	—N/a	3
4	33	(United Kingdom) Dan Ticktum	Cupra Kiro-Porsche	—N/a	1:07:576	1:05:621	1:22:817	—N/a	4
5	77	(United Kingdom) Taylor Barnard	DS Penske	1:07:459	—N/a	1:05:653	—N/a	—N/a	5
6	21	(Netherlands) Nyck de Vries	Mahindra	—N/a	1:07:551	1:05:665	—N/a	—N/a	6
7	37	(New Zealand) Nick Cassidy	Citroën	1:07:533	—N/a	1:05:963	—N/a	—N/a	7
8	94	(Germany) Pascal Wehrlein	Porsche	—N/a	1:07:496	1:06:044	—N/a	—N/a	8
9	14	(Sweden) Joel Eriksson	Envision-Jaguar	—N/a	1:07:684	—N/a	—N/a	—N/a	9
10	16	(Switzerland) Sébastien Buemi	Envision-Jaguar	1:07:544	—N/a	—N/a	—N/a	—N/a	10
11	1	(United Kingdom) Oliver Rowland	Nissan	—N/a	1:07:712	—N/a	—N/a	—N/a	11
12	48	(Switzerland) Edoardo Mortara	Mahindra	1:07:553	—N/a	—N/a	—N/a	—N/a	12
13	13	(Portugal) António Félix da Costa	Jaguar	—N/a	1:07:748	—N/a	—N/a	—N/a	13
14	3	(Spain) Pepe Martí	Cupra Kiro-Porsche	1:07:596	—N/a	—N/a	—N/a	—N/a	14
15	25	(France) Jean-Éric Vergne	Citroën	—N/a	1:07:776	—N/a	—N/a	—N/a	15
16	51	(Switzerland) Nico Müller	Porsche	1:07:714	—N/a	—N/a	—N/a	—N/a	16
17	7	(Germany) Maximilian Günther	DS Penske	—N/a	1:07:791	—N/a	—N/a	—N/a	17
18	23	(France) Norman Nato	Nissan	1:07:996	—N/a	—N/a	—N/a	—N/a	18
19	22	(Barbados) Zane Maloney	Lola Yamaha ABT	—N/a	1:08:271	—N/a	—N/a	—N/a	19
20	11	(Brazil) Lucas di Grassi	Lola Yamaha ABT	1:08:988	—N/a	—N/a	—N/a	—N/a	20

=== Race ===
The race started on 3:05 PM on the same day as qualifying.

Pos.	No.	Driver	Team	Laps	Time/Retired	Grid	Points
1	27	(United Kingdom) Jake Dennis	Andretti-Porsche	39	01:09:08.646	1	25+3^{1}
2	3	(Spain) Pepe Martí	Cupra Kiro-Porsche	39	+2.104	18	18
3	21	(Netherlands) Nyck de Vries	Mahindra	39	+2.855	5	15+1^{2}
4	13	(Portugal) António Félix da Costa	Jaguar	39	+5.702 (Note: Antonio Felix da Costa finished second, but received a five-second time penalty for moving under braking, resulting in collision with Norman Nato. Provisionally classified fifth, he gained a position following Felipe Drugovich's penalty.)	12	12
5	28	(Brazil) Felipe Drugovich	Andretti-Porsche	39	+6.112 (Note: Felipe Drugovich finished third and was promoted to second following Antonio Felix da Costa's penalty, but received a post-race five-second time penalty for causing a collision with Pascal Wehrlein.)	2	10
6	7	(Germany) Maximilian Günther	DS Penske	39	+7.116	19	8
7	51	(Switzerland) Nico Müller	Porsche	39	+8.780	14	6
8	25	(France) Jean-Éric Vergne	Citroën	39	+9.036	13	4
9	77	(United Kingdom) Taylor Barnard	DS Penske	39	+9.373	15	2
10	11	(Brazil) Lucas di Grassi	Lola Yamaha ABT	39	+9.881	20	1
11	22	(Barbados) Zane Maloney	Lola Yamaha ABT	39	+10.471	17	
12	14	(Sweden) Joel Eriksson	Envision-Jaguar	39	+11.264	8	
13	16	(Switzerland) Sébastien Buemi	Envision-Jaguar	39	+12.491	9	
14	94	(Germany) Pascal Wehrlein	Porsche	39	+12.742 (Note: Pascal Wehrlein finished seventh, but received a five-second time penalty for causing a collision with Norman Nato.)	7	
15	33	(United Kingdom) Dan Ticktum	Cupra Kiro-Porsche	39	+1:10.696	4	
Ret	9	(New Zealand) Mitch Evans	Jaguar	38	Collision damage	3	
Ret	1	(United Kingdom) Oliver Rowland	Nissan	37	Collision	10	
NC	37	(New Zealand) Nick Cassidy	Citroën	36	+3 Laps	6	
Ret	23	(France) Norman Nato	Nissan	26	Collision	16	
Ret	48	(Switzerland) Edoardo Mortara	Mahindra	20	Safety switch	11	

Notes:

- ^1 – Pole position.
- ^2 – Fastest lap.

=== Standings after the race ===
Drivers' Championship standings

	Pos	Driver	Points
	1	(New Zealand) Mitch Evans	128
	2	(United Kingdom) Oliver Rowland	109
	3	(Switzerland) Edoardo Mortara	103
	4	(Germany) Pascal Wehrlein	101
1	5	(United Kingdom) Jake Dennis	94

Teams' Championship standings

	Pos	Team	Points
	1	(United Kingdom) Jaguar	220
	2	(Germany) Porsche	190
	3	(India) Mahindra	162
2	5	(United States) Andretti Formula E	136
1	5	(Japan) Nissan	120

Manufacturers' Championship standings

	Pos	Manufacturer	Points
	1	(Germany) Porsche	324
	2	(United Kingdom) Jaguar	283
	3	(India) Mahindra	158
1	4	(Netherlands) Stellantis	154
1	5	(Japan) Nissan	142

- Notes: Only the top five positions are included for all three sets of standings.

== Notes ==
Previous race: 2026 Monaco ePrix	FIA Formula E Championship; 2025–26 season	Next race: 2026 Shanghai ePrix
Previous race: 2019 Sanya ePrix	Sanya ePrix	Next race: 2027 Sanya ePrix
