= 2026 Madrid ePrix =

Formula E race in Spain

Race 6 of 17 of the 2025–26 Formula E season
← Previous race	Next race →
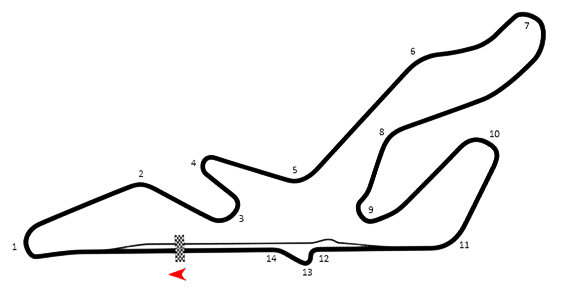

Race details
- Date: 21 March 2026
- Official name: 2026 CUPRA Raval Madrid ePrix
- Location: Circuito del Jarama, Madrid, Spain
- Course: Permanent racing facility
- Course length: 3.934 km (2.444 mi)
- Distance: 23 laps, 90.482 km (56.223 mi)

Pole position
Driver	(New Zealand) Nick Cassidy	Citroën
- Time: 1:37.141

Fastest lap
Driver	(Netherlands) Nyck de Vries (Note: Nyck de Vries set the fastest lap overall, but was not eligible for an extra point as he did not finish in the top 10. Nico Müller received the extra point for the fastest lap in the top 10.)	Mahindra
- Time: 1:32.941 on lap 21

Podium
First	(Portugal) António Félix da Costa	Jaguar
Second	(New Zealand) Mitch Evans	Jaguar
Third	(Germany) Pascal Wehrlein	Porsche

The 2026 Madrid ePrix, known for sponsorship reasons as the 2026 CUPRA Raval Madrid E-Prix was a race of the single-seater, electrically powered Formula E championship, held at the Circuito del Jarama in Madrid, Spain on 21 March 2026. It was the first ePrix held in Spain since the 2021 Valencia ePrix. It marked as the inaugural Madrid ePrix, and the sixth round of the 2025-26 season.

== Background ==
Following the fourth and fifth rounds in Jeddah, Pascal Wehrlein leads the championship at 68 points. Edoardo Mortara is second, 6 points behind, and Oliver Rowland is third, 19 points behind.

=== Circuit ===
The space for the chicane was made specifically for Formula E, with additional concrete being laid on track sometime in February, already being completed before the 2026 Eurocup-3 Spanish Winter Championship arrived there on 27 February. An additional grand stand was also added in early March to accommodate for the expected crowd at the inaugural race.

== Classfication ==
(All times in CET)

=== Qualification ===
Qualifying started at 10:40am on 21 March.

Group draw
Group A	(Germany); WEH	(United Kingdom); ROW	(New Zealand); EVA	(Portugal); DAC	(Switzerland); BUE	(Spain); MAR	(Netherlands); DEV	(France); JEV	(Barbados); MAL	(Brazil); DRU
Group B	(Switzerland); MOR	(New Zealand); CAS	(Switzerland); MUE	(United Kingdom); DEN	(Sweden); ERI	(United Kingdom); BAR	(United Kingdom); TIC	(Germany); GUE	(France); NAT	(Brazil); DIG

==== Qualifying duels ====
Quarter-finals
A2	(Portugal) António Félix da Costa
A3	(Germany) Pascal Wehrlein
A1	(Netherlands) Nyck de Vries
A4	(United Kingdom) Oliver Rowland
B2	(Switzerland) Edoardo Mortara
B3	(New Zealand) Nick Cassidy
B1	(France) Norman Nato
B4	(Germany) Maximilian Günther

Semi-finals
(Portugal) António Félix da Costa
(Netherlands) Nyck de Vries
(New Zealand) Nick Cassidy
(France) Norman Nato

Final
(Netherlands) Nyck de Vries
(New Zealand) Nick Cassidy

==== Overall classification ====
Pos.	No.	Driver	Team	A	B	QF	SF	F	Grid
1	37	(New Zealand) Nick Cassidy	Citroën	—N/a	1:41.650	1:38.861	1:37.642	1:37.141	1
2	21	(Netherlands) Nyck de Vries	Mahindra	1:41.926	—N/a	1:39.409	1:38.275	1:37.407	2
3	13	(Portugal) António Félix da Costa	Jaguar	1:42.021	—N/a	1:39.775	1:38.621	—N/a	3
4	23	(France) Norman Nato	Nissan	—N/a	1:40.927	1:39.352	1:44.903	—N/a	4
5	48	(Switzerland) Edoardo Mortara	Mahindra	—N/a	1:41.397	1:38.908	—N/a	—N/a	5
6	94	(Germany) Pascal Wehrlein	Porsche	1:42.315	—N/a	1:44.193	—N/a	—N/a	6
7	7	(Germany) Maximilian Günther	DS Penske	—N/a	1:41.748	1:44.583	—N/a	—N/a	7
8	1	(United Kingdom) Oliver Rowland	Nissan	1:42.447	—N/a	1:47.325	—N/a	—N/a	8
9	33	(United Kingdom) Dan Ticktum	Cupra Kiro-Porsche	—N/a	1:41.790	—N/a	—N/a	—N/a	9
10	22	(Barbados) Zane Maloney	Lola Yamaha ABT	1:42.790	—N/a	—N/a	—N/a	—N/a	10
11	27	(United Kingdom) Jake Dennis	Andretti-Porsche	—N/a	1:41.817	—N/a	—N/a	—N/a	11
12	3	(Spain) Pepe Martí	Cupra Kiro-Porsche	1:42.917	—N/a	—N/a	—N/a	—N/a	12
13	51	(Switzerland) Nico Müller	Porsche	—N/a	1:42.086	—N/a	—N/a	—N/a	13
14	16	(Switzerland) Sébastien Buemi	Envision-Jaguar	1:43.050	—N/a	—N/a	—N/a	—N/a	14
15	77	(United Kingdom) Taylor Barnard	DS Penske	—N/a	1:42.175	—N/a	—N/a	—N/a	15
16	9	(New Zealand) Mitch Evans	Jaguar	1:43.166	—N/a	—N/a	—N/a	—N/a	16
17	14	(Sweden) Joel Eriksson	Envision-Jaguar	—N/a	1:42.511	—N/a	—N/a	—N/a	17
18	25	(France) Jean-Éric Vergne	Citroën	1:43.478	—N/a	—N/a	—N/a	—N/a	18
19	11	(Brazil) Lucas di Grassi	Lola Yamaha ABT	—N/a	1:42.818	—N/a	—N/a	—N/a	19
20	28	(Brazil) Felipe Drugovich	Andretti-Porsche	1:44.956	—N/a	—N/a	—N/a	—N/a	20

=== Race ===
The race started at 3:05pm on 21 March.

Pos.	No.	Driver	Team	Laps	Time/Retired	Grid	Points
1	13	(Portugal) António Félix da Costa	Jaguar	23	38:26.706	3	25
2	9	(New Zealand) Mitch Evans	Jaguar	23	+0.386	16	18
3	94	(Germany) Pascal Wehrlein	Porsche	23	+0.799	6	15
4	33	(United Kingdom) Dan Ticktum	Cupra Kiro-Porsche	23	+0.985	9	12
5	48	(Switzerland) Edoardo Mortara	Mahindra	23	+1.570	5	10
6	27	(United Kingdom) Jake Dennis	Andretti-Porsche	23	+3.760	11	8
7	16	(Switzerland) Sébastien Buemi	Envision-Jaguar	23	+3.822	14	6
8	51	(Switzerland) Nico Müller	Porsche	23	+3.884	13	4+1^{2}
9	3	(Spain) Pepe Martí	Cupra Kiro-Porsche	23	+4.117	12	2
10	14	(Sweden) Joel Eriksson	Envision-Jaguar	23	+6.576	17	1
11	23	(France) Norman Nato	Nissan	23	+7.182	4	
12	11	(Brazil) Lucas di Grassi	Lola Yamaha ABT	23	+10.216	19	
13	7	(Germany) Maximilian Günther	DS Penske	23	+15.686	7	
14	25	(France) Jean-Éric Vergne	Citroën	23	+16.345	18	
15	28	(Brazil) Felipe Drugovich	Andretti-Porsche	23	+26.016	20	
16	1	(United Kingdom) Oliver Rowland	Nissan	23	+26.917	8	
17	37	(New Zealand) Nick Cassidy	Citroën	23	+29.372	1	0+3^{1}
18	21	(Netherlands) Nyck de Vries	Mahindra	23	+53.664	2	
19	77	(United Kingdom) Taylor Barnard	DS Penske	23	+55.751	15	
20	22	(Barbados) Zane Maloney	Lola Yamaha ABT	23	+55.889	10	

Notes:

- ^1 – Pole position.
- ^2 – Fastest lap.

=== Standings after the race ===
Drivers' Championship standings

	Pos	Driver	Points
	1	(Germany) Pascal Wehrlein	83
	2	(Switzerland) Edoardo Mortara	72
2	3	(New Zealand) Mitch Evans	65
3	4	(Portugal) António Félix da Costa	64
1	5	(New Zealand) Nick Cassidy	51

Teams' Championship standings

	Pos	Team	Points
	1	(Germany) Porsche	133
	2	(United Kingdom) Jaguar	129
	3	(India) Mahindra	84
1	4	(United Kingdom) Envision	62
1	5	(France) Citroën	61

Manufacturers' Championship standings

Pos	Manufacturer	Points
1	(Germany) Porsche	170
2	(United Kingdom) Jaguar	167
3	(Netherlands) Stellantis	93
4	(India) Mahindra	80
5	(Japan) Nissan	73

- Notes: Only the top five positions are included for all three sets of standings.

== Notes ==
Previous race: 2026 Jeddah ePrix (February)	FIA Formula E World Championship; 2025–26 season	Next race: 2026 Berlin ePrix
Previous race: N/A	Madrid ePrix	Next race: 2027 Madrid ePrix
