= 2017 New York City ePrix =

Pair of Formula E electric car races

The 2017 New York City ePrix (formally the 2017 FIA Formula E Qualcomm New York City ePrix) were a pair of Formula E electric car races held on July 15 and 16, 2017 at Brooklyn Street Circuit in Red Hook, Brooklyn before a two-day crowd of 20,000 people. They were the ninth and tenth races of the 2016–17 Formula E Championship and the first New York City ePrix. The first race, contested over 43 laps on July 15, was won by Virgin driver Sam Bird after starting from fourth place. The Techeetah duo of Jean-Éric Vergne and Stéphane Sarrazin took second and third. The longer 49-lap race held the next day was won by Bird from pole position. Mahindra teammates Felix Rosenqvist and Nick Heidfeld finished second and third.

Alex Lynn started from pole position for the first race by recording the fastest lap in qualifying, but Daniel Abt passed him at the start. Abt elected to conserve electrical energy, meaning he could not establish a significant lead at the front and later struggled with his brakes, prompting his team to request he focus on harvesting electrical energy. After twice not being able to pass Abt two laps previously, Bird overtook Abt for first the lead on lap 16. Bird maintained the lead after switching into a second car, until a safety car was necessitated for Heidfeld's car. At the lap 41-restart, Bird blocked a pass by Vergne on the final lap to win. There were two lead changes among two different drivers during the course of the race.

Bird carried over his form from the previous day and won the pole position for the second race, but lost the lead to Rosenqvist at the start. However, he was able to remain close behind Rosenqvist early in the race, catching the latter off guard following a restart, and passed him to retake the lead on the 11th lap. Lynn stopped his car on track nine laps later, prompting a full course yellow flag, and several drivers made pit stops to switch into their second cars. Bird chose to remain on track for one additional lap, and retook the lead with extra electrical energy. Bird opened up a significant lead over the rest of the field, and won the race. There was one lead change among two different drivers during the course of the race.

The victories were Bird's fourth and fifth of his career and he became the first driver to win both races of a double header weekend since Nico Prost at the 2016 London ePrix. The results allowed Lucas di Grassi to lower the lead of Drivers' Championship leader Sébastien Buemi (who was absent because of a World Endurance Championship commitment) to ten points. Rosenqvist maintained third position while Bird's two victories moved him from eighth to fourth and Prost fell to fifth. e.Dams-Renault maintained their Teams' Championship lead with 229 points and increased their gap over Audi Sport ABT by seven points. Mahindra remained in third and Virgin consolidated fourth with two races left in the season.

== Background to race weekend ==
=== Preview ===
Coming into the double header from Berlin five weeks earlier, e.Dams-Renault driver Sébastien Buemi led the Drivers' Championship with 157 points, 32 ahead Lucas di Grassi in second, and a further 39 in front of third-placed Felix Rosenqvist. Nico Prost was fourth on 72 points, nine points ahead of Nick Heidfeld in fifth position. e.Dams-Renault led the Teams' Championship with 229 points; Audi Sport ABT were second on 171 points, and Mahindra third with 149 points. With 97 points, Virgin were in fourth place, and Techeetah was fifth 40 points adrift.

=== Preparations ===
In March 2014, it was announced that Formula E was working with New York City authorities to bring a motor race to the area. Formula E's founder Alejandro Agag told CNN in May 2016 he was "very optimistic" about the possibility of hosting an event in the city, having visited potential sites there, "Our dream would be to have a race in New York." Originally, planners considered Governors Island, Central Park, and Liberty State Park in Jersey City as possible locations for the track. However, these sites were not chosen since a Governors Island track would have been too costly; a Central Park circuit would have required cutting down trees; and Liberty State Park is outside city limits. New York City deputy mayor Alicia Glen visited Paris in May 2016. After attending the ePrix, she lent her support to the New York City race with backing from the New York City Economic Development Corporation. A one-year contract to stage the race was signed with a renewal option every year for the next ten years.

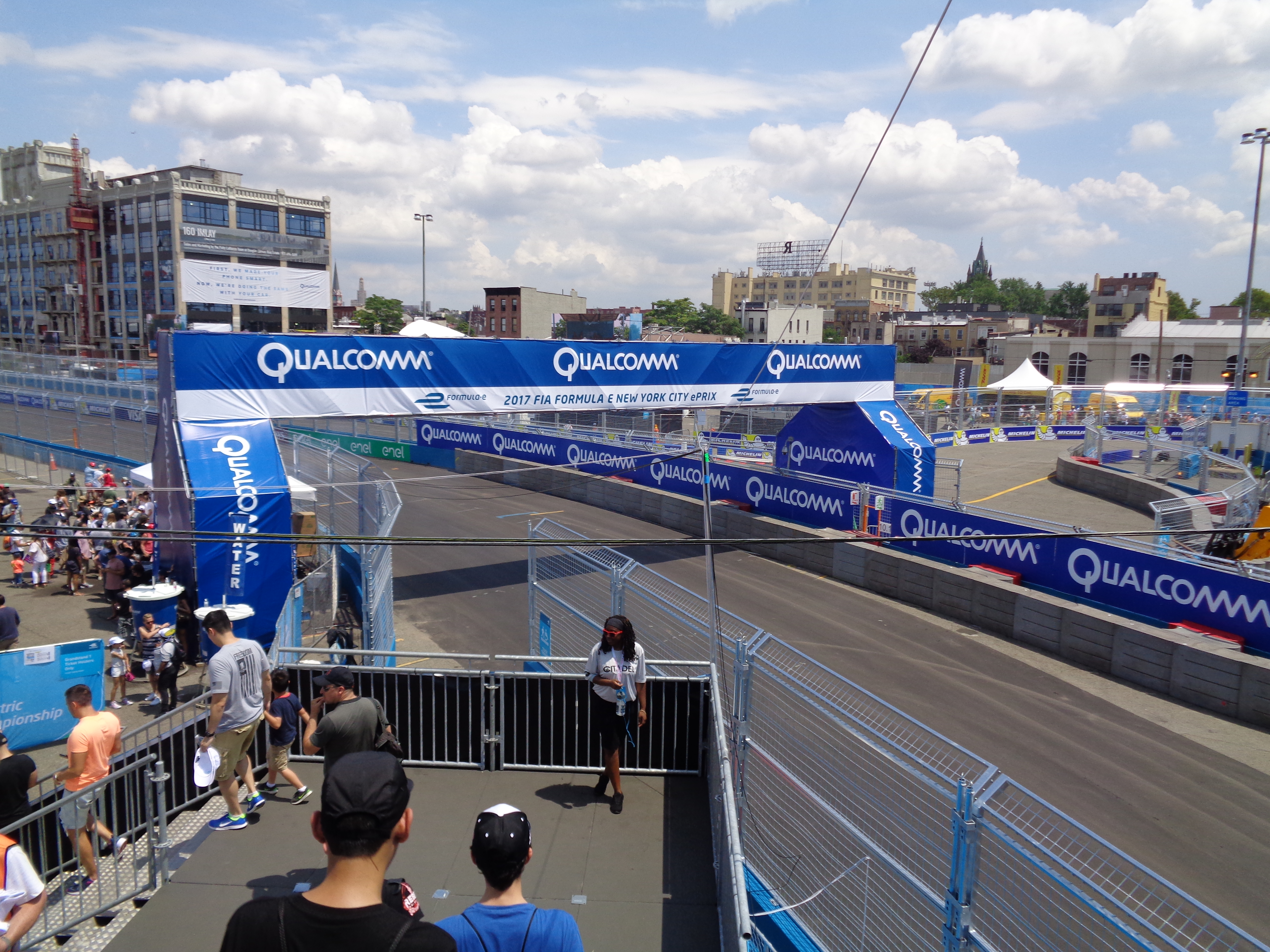
The Brooklyn Street Circuit, where the race was held

On September 21, 2016, officials announced the New York City ePrix would be held on the 1.210 mi (1.947 km) long Brooklyn Street Circuit in the Brooklyn neighborhood of Red Hook. Senior figures supported the race with mayor Bill de Blasio calling Red Hook the place where is "no better home for the ePrix", and the Fédération Internationale de l'Automobile (FIA) president Jean Todt said bringing the series to the city was "an amazing achievement in itself". The event was confirmed one week later as part of Formula E's 2016–17 schedule by the FIA World Motor Sports Council as a double header round. They were the ninth and tenth single-seater electric car races of the Championship, and were held on July 15 and 16, 2017. It was the first FIA-sanctioned open-wheel motor sport round to be held in New York City, and its first motor race since 1896. The New York City ePrix was the third city to hold a Formula E race in the United States, following the Miami ePrix in 2015 and the Long Beach ePrix in 2015 and 2016. The press expected the races to be attended by about 18,000 to 40,000 spectators.

The first pictures of the planned layout were released to the media on September 21. Construction of the track began on July 2, 13 days before the first race, and finished 11 days later. More than $20 million was spent renovating the area which included the dismantling of pedestrian crosswalks, sections of curb and bus canopies because they protruded into the circuit and a terminal guardhouse in the track's centre was rebuilt to make it portable for moving before and after the event. Rosenqvist described the track as "one of those really technical circuits" and believed the layout was comparable to the Circuit des Invalides.

=== World Endurance Championship clash ===
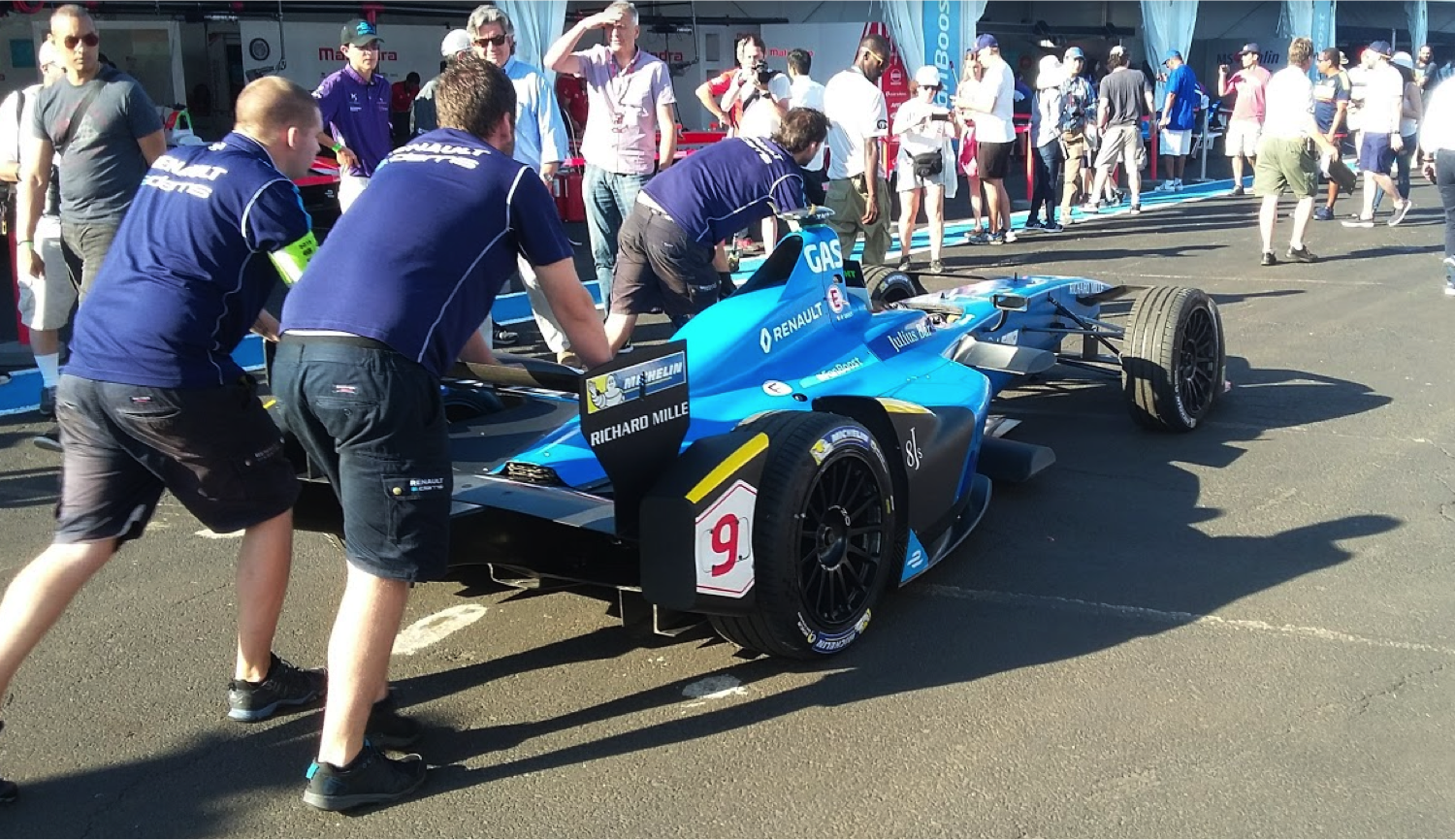
The car of Pierre Gasly in the paddock prior to Sunday qualifying. He replaced Sébastien Buemi who had a World Endurance Championship commitment.

With the races scheduled for July 15 and 16, the event conflicted with the 2017 6 Hours of Nürburgring. The clash occurred because the CEO of the World Endurance Championship (WEC) Gérard Neveu and teams agreed not to hold a race within four weeks after the 24 Hours of Le Mans, and the Nürburgring required a two-week gap leading into a proposed 30 July date for the German Grand Prix. Previously Neveu and Agag had a "gentlemen's agreement", preventing their respective series from holding races on the same weekend as several drivers participate in both disciplines. The dates for the New York City races could not be changed because of its location and ship docking schedules, and the Nürburgring event was not rescheduled due to freight needing transporting to Mexico City and the circuit had been rented for the weekend after. WEC and Formula E reached an agreement in July 2017, preventing both series from clashing in 2018.

Prost and Nelson Piquet Jr. (Jaguar) were the first two WEC drivers to confirm their participation in New York in February, with Jaguar's Adam Carroll leaving the endurance racing series to focus on Formula E. Sam Bird reached an agreement with his team AF Corse to contest the New York races, and was partnered at Virgin by the team's development driver Alex Lynn after José María López was required to prioritize WEC by Toyota. Championship leader Buemi could not reach an agreement that would allow him to enter the first race because of logistical problems, and Toyota mandated he attend the Nürburgring WEC round. He was replaced by 2016 GP2 Series champion and Super Formula driver Pierre Gasly.

== Race one ==
2017 New York City ePrix
Race 9 of 12 of the 2016–17 Formula E Championship
← Previous race	Next race →
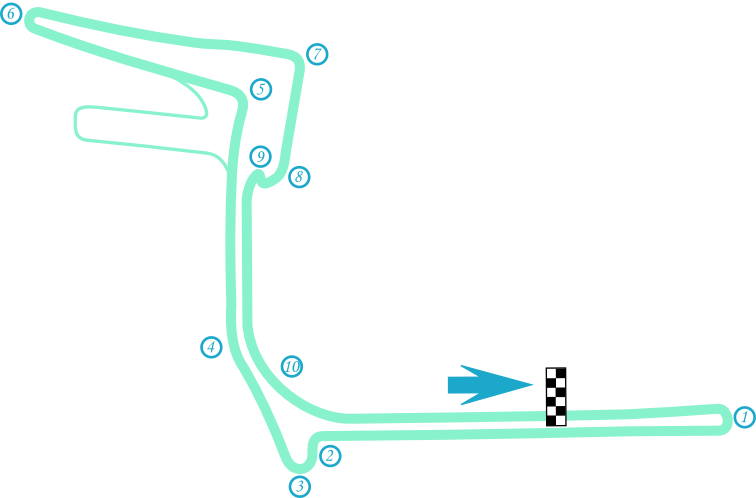

Race details
- Date: July 15, 2017
- Official name: 2017 FIA Formula E Qualcomm New York City ePrix
- Location: Brooklyn Street Circuit, Red Hook, Brooklyn
- Course: Street circuit
- Course length: 1.953 km (1.220 miles)
- Distance: 43 laps, 83.979 km (52.182 miles)
- Weather: Dry, Air: 29.25 to 29.8 °C (84.65 to 85.64 °F), Track: 32.8 to 33.9 °C (91.0 to 93.0 °F)

Pole position
Driver	(United Kingdom) Alex Lynn	Virgin-Citroën
- Time: 1:03.296

Fastest lap
Driver	(Germany) Maro Engel	Venturi
- Time: 1:03.883 on lap 21

Podium
First	(United Kingdom) Sam Bird	Virgin-Citroën
Second	(France) Jean-Éric Vergne	Techeetah-Renault
Third	(France) Stéphane Sarrazin	Techeetah-Renault

=== Practice and qualifying ===
Two practice sessions—both on Saturday morning—were held before the late afternoon race. The first session ran for 45 minutes and the second for 30 minutes. A 30-minute shakedown session took place on Friday afternoon in which no competitive lap times were set was held on a wet track for the first time in Formula E history. Lynn was fastest in the first session, which took place on a damp track created by heavy rain from Friday but dried as the session progressed, with a late lap of 1 minute, 5.977 seconds, almost two-tenths of a second faster than teammate Bird in second and Rosenqvist third. Prost was fourth-fastest, ahead of both Audi Sport ABT drivers Daniel Abt and di Grassi. Jérôme d'Ambrosio, Mitch Evans, Robin Frijns and Adam Carroll rounded out the session's top-ten drivers. The session was temporarily halted three minutes in when Tom Dillmann (Venturi) stopped his car on track and could not restart. Jean-Éric Vergne later drifted wide onto the run-off area but avoided damage to his car. Rosenqvist used 200 kW (270 hp) of power to set the second practice session's fastest lap time, at 1 minute, 2.423 seconds despite minor contact with a wall leaving turn five with his right-rear tire, damaging its suspension. The damage however was not severe enough to rule him out and was repaired. He was three-tenths of a second faster than teammate Heidfeld in second and Prost third. Bird, the Audi Sport ABT duo of di Grassi and Abt, Loïc Duval, Evans, Frijns and Lynn completed the top ten. Late in the session, di Grassi drove to the side of the track with a battery management system problem and could not restart his car, necessitating race control to activate the full course yellow procedure.

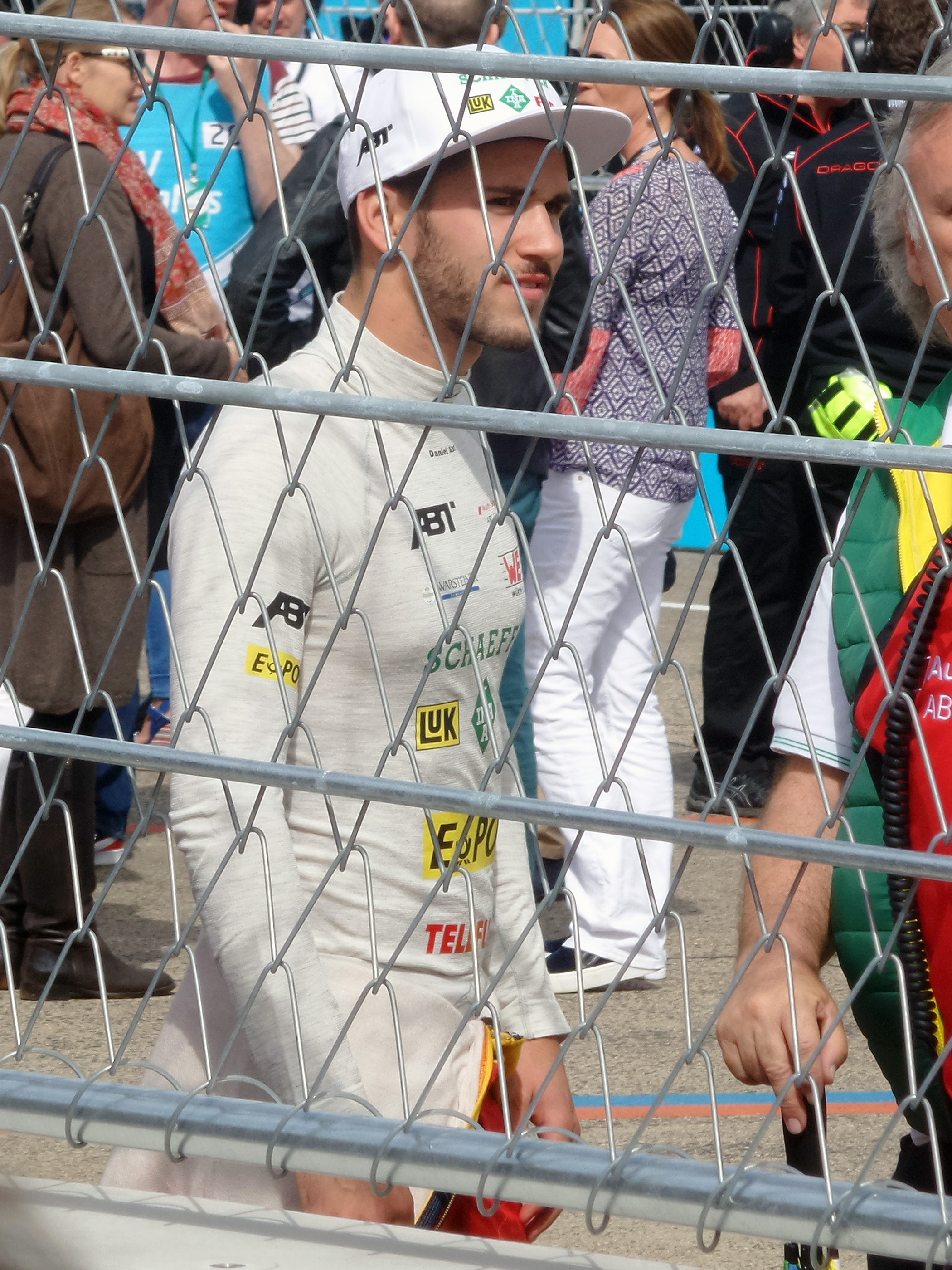
Daniel Abt (pictured in 2015) qualified second and led the first race's 15 laps before retiring with car problems.

Saturday's afternoon qualifying session ran for 60 minutes and was divided into four groups of five cars. Each group was determined by a lottery system and was permitted six minutes of on-track activity. All drivers were limited to two timed laps with one at maximum power. The fastest five overall competitors in the four groups participated in a "Super Pole" session with one driver on the track at any time going out in reverse order from fifth to first. Each of the five drivers was limited to one timed lap and the starting order was determined by the competitor's fastest times (Super Pole from first to fifth, and group qualifying from sixth to twentieth). The driver and team who recorded the fastest time were awarded three points towards their respective championships. Qualifying took place in dry and warm weather. In the first group of five runners, Vergne paced the session despite minor contact with a barrier lining the circuit, going four-tenths of a second faster than second-placed Duval. Andretti teammates Frijns and António Félix da Costa were third and fourth (the latter lightly impacted a wall between the eighth and ninth corners) and Gasly was the group's slowest driver after hitting a concrete wall, damaging his suspension. D'Ambrosio set the second group's fastest lap time, three-tenths of a second faster than Heidfeld in second. Prost, Stéphane Sarrazin and Evans were group two's slowest three participants. In the third group, Abt was fastest with Lynn second. Piquet took third with Carroll fourth. Rosenqvist slid and went deep at the turn one hairpin, losing him two seconds of time and was the third group's slowest entrant.

Bird set the fastest overall lap at 1 minute, 2.806 seconds, going almost six-tenths of a second faster than Oliver Turvey in second. Di Grassi, Dillmann, and Maro Engel was the fourth group's slowest three drivers. Engel was affected by a problem which emerged before he could record a maximum power lap, forcing di Grassi to slow because yellow flags were waved. At the end of group qualifying, Bird, d'Ambrosio, Abt, Lynn and Vergne's lap times qualified them for super pole. In what was considered "a shock result" by the motorsport press, Lynn took the first pole position of his career, with a lap of 1 minute, 3.296 seconds in his first race meeting. He became the first driver to win the pole position in his debut Formula E race since Vergne at the 2014 Punta del Este ePrix. Lynn was joined on the grid's front row by Abt, who lost time in the final third of a lap. Abt was 0.003 seconds ahead of the third-place qualifier Vergne. Bird had an untidy lap that left him fourth as he could not match his teammate's pace with two errors at the track's hairpins. D'Ambrosio could not get his car into a qualifying setup, resulting in him locking his tires at turn six, and took fifth. The rest of the field lined up as Heidfeld, Piquet, Turvey, Prost, di Grassi, Sarrazin, Duval, Carroll, Evans, Dillmann, Frijns, Rosenqvist, Félix da Costa, Gasly and Engel.

=== Race ===
The first race began at 16:00 Eastern Daylight Time (UTC−05:00). The weather at the start was dry and sunny with the air temperature between 84.65 to 85.64 °F (29.25 to 29.80 °C) and the track temperature ranged from 91.0 to 93.0 °F (32.8 to 33.9 °C). A special feature of Formula E is the "Fan Boost" feature, an additional 100 kW (130 hp) of power to use in the driver's second car. The three drivers who were allowed to use the boost were determined by a fan vote. For the first New York race, Abt, di Grassi and Vergne were handed the extra power. When the race started, Lynn spun his tires, allowing Abt to overtake him at the turn one hairpin. Bird and di Grassi gained one position at the start; traffic delayed di Grassi at the hairpins, where multiple cars made contact but sustained no bodywork damage. Rosenqvist gained six positions by the end of the first lap while Prost lost nine places over the same distance because of car damage. Evans was required to switch into his second car because of a broken right front wheel, and d'Ambrosio entered the pit lane with left-corner front wing damage after contact with Piquet.

At the end of the first lap, Abt led from Lynn, who was followed in turn by, Bird, Vergne, Heidfeld, d'Ambrosio, Turvey, Sarrazin, Piquet, and di Grassi. Abt opted to conserve electrical energy, meaning he could not establish a large lead over both Virgin drivers. Lynn defended from teammate Bird but the latter grew frustrated over his manoeuvres. Bird was granted permission to pass Lynn at the second corner on lap nine. Heidfeld overtook Vergne for fourth place at the end of the same lap. Abt was struggling with his brakes; his team requested he focus on restoring electrical energy. Bird challenged Abt for the lead, attempting to pass him twice on lap 14 but was unsuccessful both times. Two laps later, Bird took the lead from Abt by aggressively turning to the inside of him at the turn five hairpin. Vergne and Heidfeld attacked Lynn who was struggling to manage his car's electrical energy. Heidfeld took advantage of a small gap left by Lynn to pass him for third into the turn two chicane on the 16th lap. Vergne passed Lynn for fourth place at the turn one hairpin on the next lap.

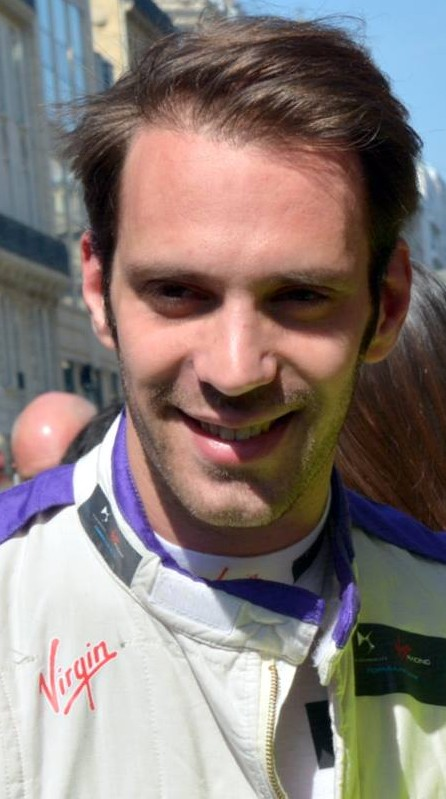
Jean-Éric Vergne (pictured in 2016) ran strongly to finish second in the first race.

Heidfeld placed pressure onto Abt but Vergne was drawing closer to him, allowing Abt to pull out a small gap over the pair. Vergne began his attack before the opening of the pit stop window and moved past Heidfeld at the turn two chicane for third on lap 18. Further down the field, Carroll and Félix da Costa battled each other and both cars made contact, littering the track with debris. On the 21st lap, Abt fell to third when he was passed by Vergne. The mandatory pit stops, during which all drivers need to change into a second car, began on the same lap when Lynn entered the pit lane after Vergne overtook him for sixth position. Bird and Vergne made their pit stops on the same lap, handing the lead back to Abt. Engel set the race's fastest lap on the same lap. His lap of 1 minute, 3.883 seconds earned him one point. Abt was on an alternative strategy, and led for one lap before relinquishing it to Bird. After the pit stops, Bird led Vergne by 2.2 seconds, with Abt five seconds behind Bird. Swift work from Sarrazin's pit crew promoted him to fourth, while Rosenqvist moved to sixth after starting from 17th position, though his teammate Heidfeld fell to eighth.

Lynn's race was curtailed on lap 25 when he stopped on track with a driveshaft failure. Di Grassi was separated by the two Mahindras of Rosenqvist and Heidfeld, and battled the former while also defending from the latter. Dillmann and Gasly overtook Carroll to move into the top ten on lap 29. As the lead group established themselves, attention focused on di Grassi's duel with Rosenqvist. Di Grassi was cautious as he attempted to find room to pass Rosenqvist, but kept pressuring him. On lap 33, Rosenqvist locked his tires turning into the turn two chicane, causing him to lose control of his car's rear, and drifted into the corner's exit barrier. His error promoted di Grassi into fifth place; the impact removed his rear wing, prompting race officials to display a black flag with an orange circle, requiring him to make a pit stop for repairs. After passing Dillmann, Gasly was in seventh position. Heidfeld's right-rear suspension collapsed after hitting the turn three inside kerb too hard on the 37th lap. He stopped on track, triggering the safety car's deployment, and reducing the time gaps within the field. Heidfeld pushed his car back to pit lane without assistance from marshals.

The safety car was withdrawn at the end of lap 41, and racing resumed with Bird leading Vergne and Abt. On the final lap, Abt slowed with a battery management system failure in the first turn, enabling Sarrazin to claim third place. As Abt attempted to rejoin, he almost hit teammate di Grassi, and stopped on track, preventing him from finishing. Vergne attempted to pass Bird by braking later than him on the lap, but could not overtake him and Bird maintained the lead to secure his first victory of the season, the fourth of his career, and his first since the 2016 Buenos Aires ePrix. He became the first driver to win a motor race in New York City. Vergne finished second, 1.3 seconds behind and his teammate Sarrazin took third. Di Grassi was fourth, Duval fifth and Turvey sixth. The two e.Dams-Renaults of Gasly and Prost were seventh and eighth. Frijns and Carroll rounded out the top ten. Piquet and Félix da Costa were in the next two positions. Problems dropped Dillmann to 13th. Abt and Rosenqvist were the final finishers. Evans, d'Ambrosio and Engel were the other three drivers not to finish the race. There were two lead changes during the race; two drivers reached the front of the field. Bird led twice for a total of 27 laps, out of 43.

=== Post-race ===
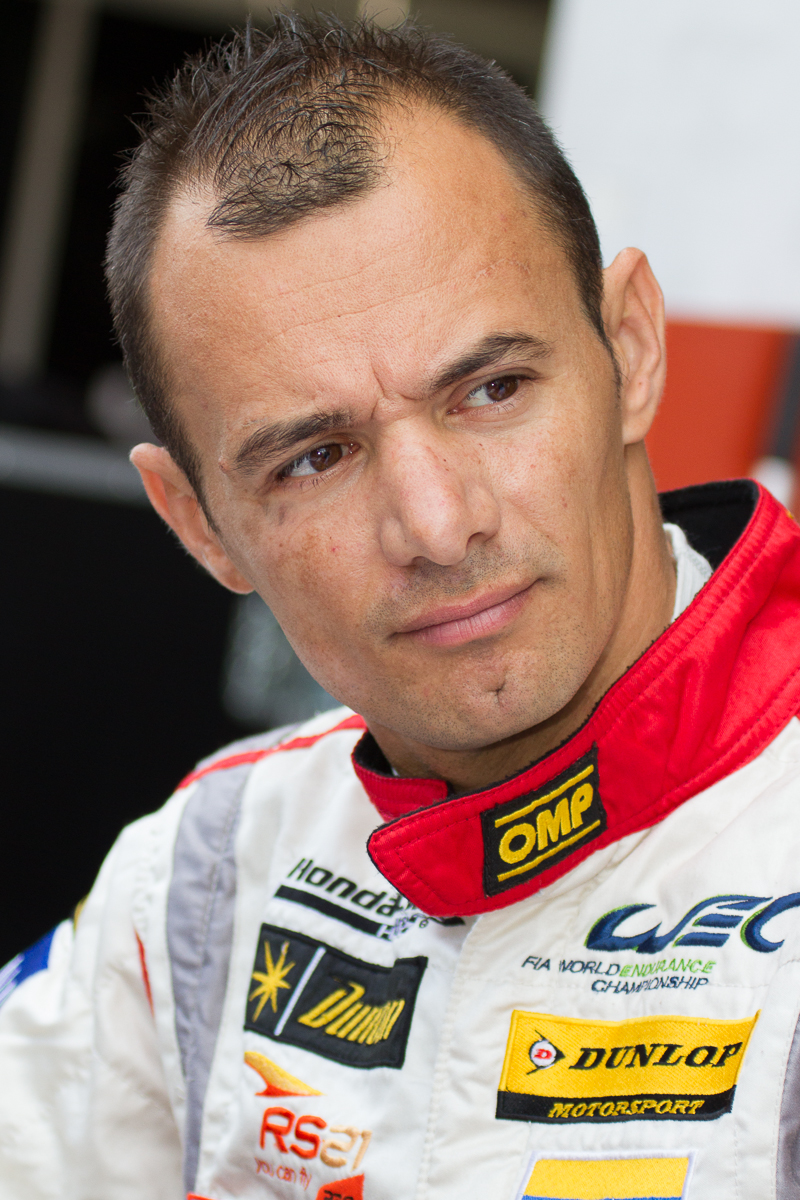
Stéphane Sarrazin (pictured in 2012) achieved his first podium of his season with a third-place finish.

The top three drivers appeared on the podium to collect their trophies and spoke to the media in a later press conference. Bird was delighted with the victory, calling his achievement "incredible" and congratulated Formula E for organising the event: "I can imagine how difficult it was, but it’s been an amazing week so far. We had pretty good speed today." He said both Berlin races were "a turning point" for his team as they had been extensively educated on their performance and praised his teammate Lynn for taking the pole position. Vergne was pleased to finish second but claimed his getaway off the grid prevented him from winning the race as there was a large amount of dirt off the racing line, causing him to lose positions. However, he was aware he could reclaim ground in the ePrix's opening phase, and increased his pace to conserve more electrical energy than Bird but felt the latter deserved the victory. Sarrazin said he felt "very good" to finish third, and despite making a small error in qualifying, he felt "lucky" because of Abt's final lap problem.

Following battery re-generation problems on his car leaving him unable to finish the event after having led the first 16 laps, Abt spoke of his annoyance and revealed he had some issues with his first car: adding "But still we were in a position to at least take a podium here which would have been good points. Still good, and then last lap my car shuts off with a battery failure or whatever. It’s annoying." He was also disappointed over losing the possibility of finishing on the podium, but said it was continually satisfying to compete at the front of the pack; however he claimed to feel more satisfied to be the first driver to finish the race: "I don’t know why this always happens to me, so many times. It’s just really annoying because in the end people forget what happened."

The result reduced Buemi's Drivers' Championship to 20 points by di Grassi finishing fourth. Rosenqvist remained in third position on 86 points, but his advantage over Prost in fourth place had decreased to ten points. Bird's victory moved him from eighth to fifth. e.Dams-Renault still led the Teams' Championship on 239 points, although their lead over Audi Sport ABT had been narrowed slightly by two points. Mahindra maintained third place on 149 points. Virgin consolidated fourth position with 125 points, and Techeetah further extended their advantage over NextEV for fifth with three races left in the season.

=== Standings after the race ===
- **Bold text** indicates who still had a theoretical chance of becoming Champion.

Drivers' Championship standings

+/–	Pos	Driver	Points
	1	(Switzerland) **Sébastien Buemi**	157
	2	(Brazil) **Lucas di Grassi**	137 (−20)
	3	(Sweden) **Felix Rosenqvist**	86 (−71)
	4	(France) **Nico Prost**	76 (−81)
3	5	(United Kingdom) **Sam Bird**	63 (−94)

Teams' Championship standings

+/–	Pos	Team	Points
	1	(France) **e.Dams-Renault**	239
	2	(Germany) **Audi Sport ABT**	183 (−56)
	3	(India) **Mahindra**	149 (−80)
	4	(United Kingdom) **Virgin-Citroën**	125 (−114)
	5	(China) Techeetah-Renault	90 (−149)

- Notes: Only the top five positions are included for both sets of standings.

== Race two ==
2017 New York City ePrix
Race 10 of 12 of the 2016–17 Formula E Championship
← Previous race	Next race →
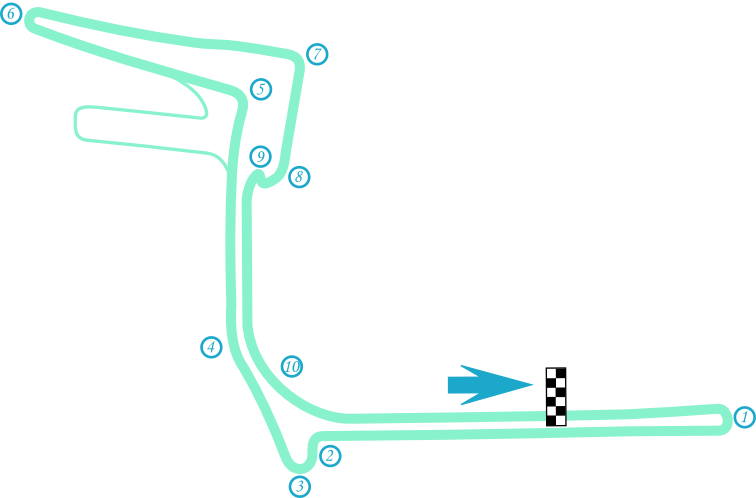

Race details
- Date: July 16, 2017
- Official name: 2017 FIA Formula E Qualcomm New York City ePrix
- Location: Brooklyn Street Circuit, Red Hook, Brooklyn
- Course: Street circuit
- Course length: 1.953 km (1.220 miles)
- Distance: 49 laps, 95.697 km (59.463 miles)
- Weather: Dry, Air: 28.6 to 29.5 °C (83.5 to 85.1 °F), Track: 28.35 to 28.9 °C (83.03 to 84.02 °F)

Pole position
Driver	(United Kingdom) Sam Bird	Virgin-Citroën
- Time: 1:02.285

Fastest lap
Driver	(Germany) Daniel Abt	Audi Sport ABT
- Time: 1:03.898 on lap 7

Podium
First	(United Kingdom) Sam Bird	Virgin-Citroën
Second	(Sweden) Felix Rosenqvist	Mahindra
Third	(Germany) Nick Heidfeld	Mahindra

=== Practice and qualifying ===
One 45-minute practice session on Sunday morning was held before the early afternoon race. Bird recorded the fastest lap of the third practice session, which took place in dry and warm weather, of 1 minute, 2.209 seconds, almost two-tenths of a second faster than Vergne in second. Engel, Turvey, Piquet, Dillmann, Lynn, di Grassi, d'Ambrosio and Heidfeld were in positions three to ten. Dillmann broke his front-left suspension following an impact with a barrier leaving the turn six hairpin. He could not drive back to pit lane, and stopped his car at the next corner, necessitating a red flag. Di Grassi carried excess speed into the turn one hairpin, and steered in the opposite direction to continue driving. The session ended early when Frijns lost control of his car's rear, and hit the turn ten wall, littering the circuit with debris. Frijns vacated his vehicle but limped slightly, possibly caused by hitting his leg on the monocoque cell.

Sunday's qualifying session was held in the morning rather than the traditional afternoon. Qualifying took place in dry and warm weather. In the first group of five runners, Bird paced the session, ahead of Frijns. Prost and Piquet were third and fourth due to both drivers losing time through errors. Duval had trouble selecting second gear, and ran deep into the first turn, ending the first group slowest. Rosenqvist set a lap immediately made him fastest in the second group, ahead of Turvey and Abt. D'Ambrosio and Félix da Costa were the second group's slowest participants. In the third group, Gasly set the fastest overall time in group qualifying at 1 minute, 2.080 seconds, one-tenth of a second faster than Vergne in second place. Di Grassi hit the turn three exit barrier lightly en route to third. Sarrazin and Evans finished the third group as its slowest competitors. In the fourth group, Heidfeld set a final minute lap that made him fastest, ahead of Engel and Dillmann. After changing three car components, Lynn struggled with brake temperatures and was fourth. Carroll was the fourth group's slowest driver after contact with the turn five exit barrier. At the end of group qualifying, Gasly, Rosenqvist, Vergne, Bird and Heidfeld qualified for super pole. Bird won pole position with a lap of 1 minute, 2.285 seconds, and was joined on the grid's front row by Rosenqvist. Vergne locked his tires at the hairpin, which disrupted his rhythm through the following corners, but recovered enough time to qualify third. Gasly went wide at the turn one hairpin, leaving him fourth. Heidfeld's lap was untidy, and started fifth. After qualifying, Frijns and Piquet were demoted ten places because of a gearbox and engine change, respectively. and Piquet did the same after changing his engine. After the penalties, the rest of the grid lined up as Engel, Turvey, Abt, di Grassi, Dillmann, Sarrazin, Evans, d'Ambrosio, Prost, Lynn, Félix da Costa, Duval, Carroll, Frijns and Piquet.

=== Race ===
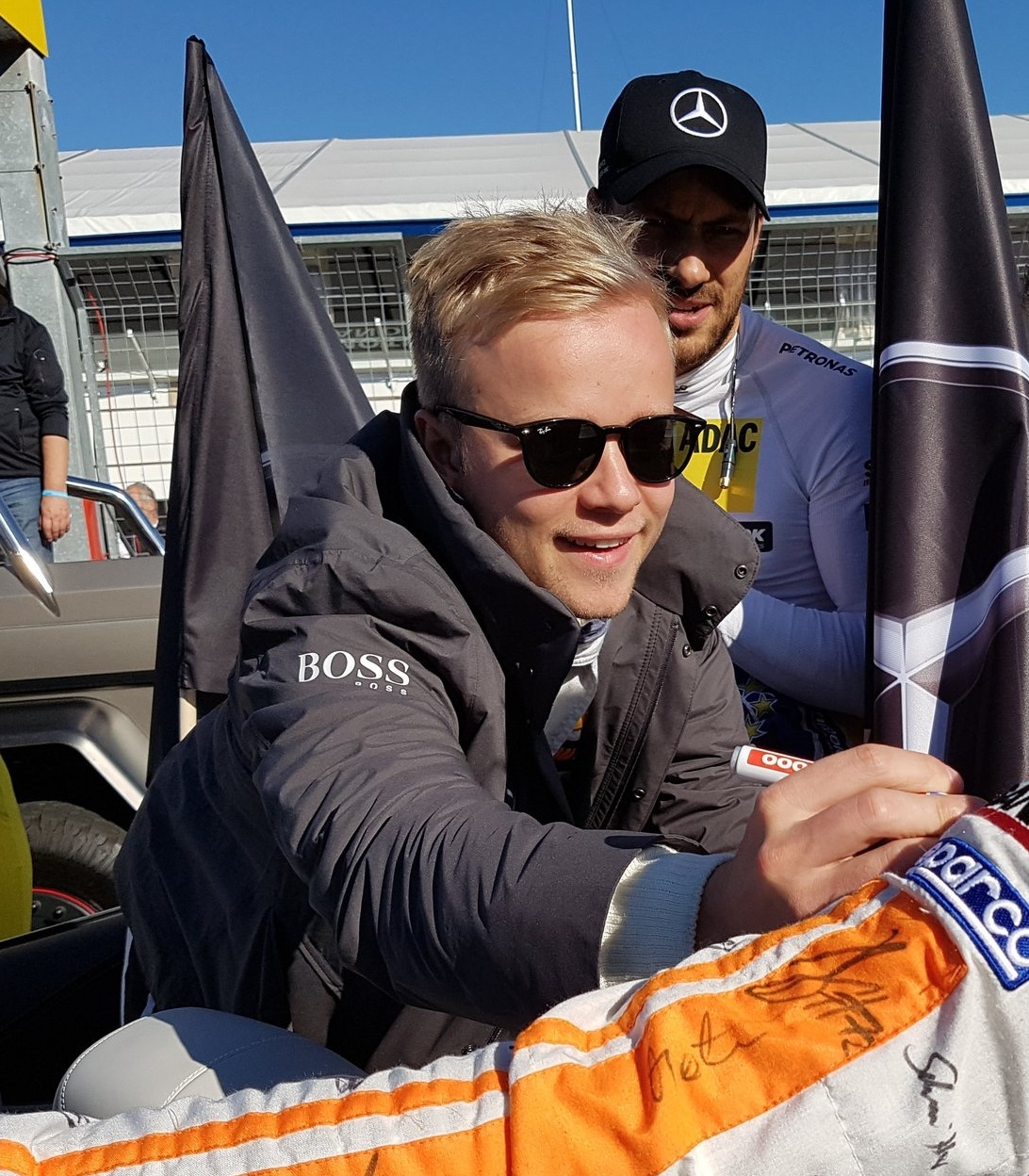
Felix Rosenqvist (pictured in 2016) started on the front row of the grid and led the first ten laps of the second race.

The second race started at 13:00 local time. The weather at the start of the race were dry and sunny with the air temperature between 83.5 and 85.1 °F (28.6 and 29.5 °C) and the track temperature from 83.03 to 84.02 °F (28.35 to 28.90 °C). The second event was six laps longer than the first, making battery management the core concern of every driver. For the second consecutive day, it was not the pole sitter who led as Rosenqvist accelerated faster than Bird and passed him into the turn one hairpin. Gasly fell to fifth behind Heidfeld. Just as in the first race, several drivers made contact in the first turn. Abt's rear wheel guard was damaged from contact with teammate di Grassi and Dillmann. Engel ploughed into the rear of Vergne in the first corner, and was shown a black flag with an orange circle, requiring him to enter the pit lane for repairs. Abt slowed halfway through the first lap, stopping in the centre of the track to perform a full reset, and fell to the rear of the field. Prost gained three positions by the end of the first lap, while Abt fell twelve places over the same distance.

At the end of the first lap Rosenqvist led from Bird, Vergne, Heidfeld, Gasly, Engel, Turvey, Dillmann, di Grassi, and Evans. Bird was close behind Rosenqvist in the opening laps, while Heidfeld drew closer to both drivers. After starting ninth, di Grassi was seventh by lap seven. Engel hit a trackside barrier, and drove to pit lane where his team repaired his car and was focused on setting the race's fastest lap. However he did not achieve this as Abt set the fastest lap on his seventh lap. Abt completed a circuit in 1 minute, 3.898 seconds to earn one point. After locking his right-front brake, Evans ran wide, and stopped his car near the pit lane entry after lightly hitting a wall two laps later. Evans had difficulty reversing out of the barrier, prompting the first full course yellow flag. Gasly was the first driver to notice this, slowing in turn ten, and fell back from the top three. During the full course yellow, di Grassi, Abt and Heidfeld were announced as the winners of the second FanBoost vote.

Racing resumed on lap 10 with Rosenqvist leading Bird and Heidfeld. Shortly afterward, Bird attacked Rosenqvist, catching the latter off guard, and passing him on the inside at the turn six hairpin for the lead at the start of the 11th lap. Heidfeld could not pass his teammate as Gasly was drawing closer to the lead group. Bird began to pull away from the field. Frijns was preserving electrical energy in an attempt to gain positions. The other half of the top ten were delayed by Turvey with Dillmann and di Grassi battling him. Dillmann and di Grassi managed to overtake the struggling Turvey. Engel chose to risk changing into his second car on lap 15, but dropped to 18th while Vergne moved to 12th. A second full course yellow was necessitated on lap 20 when Lynn stopped in the centre of the straight after the turn one chicane with a technical problem. This prompted several drivers, including Mahindra teammates Rosenqvist and Heidfeld, to enter the pit lane for the mandatory change into their second cars on the same lap. Bird opted to remain on track for one additional lap before making his stop, giving him more electrical energy than the drivers behind him. Techeetah drivers Vergne and Sarrazin were caught off guard by the full course yellow, and switched to their second cars just as the field returned to racing speed. The two lost positions, but had more usable electrical energy.

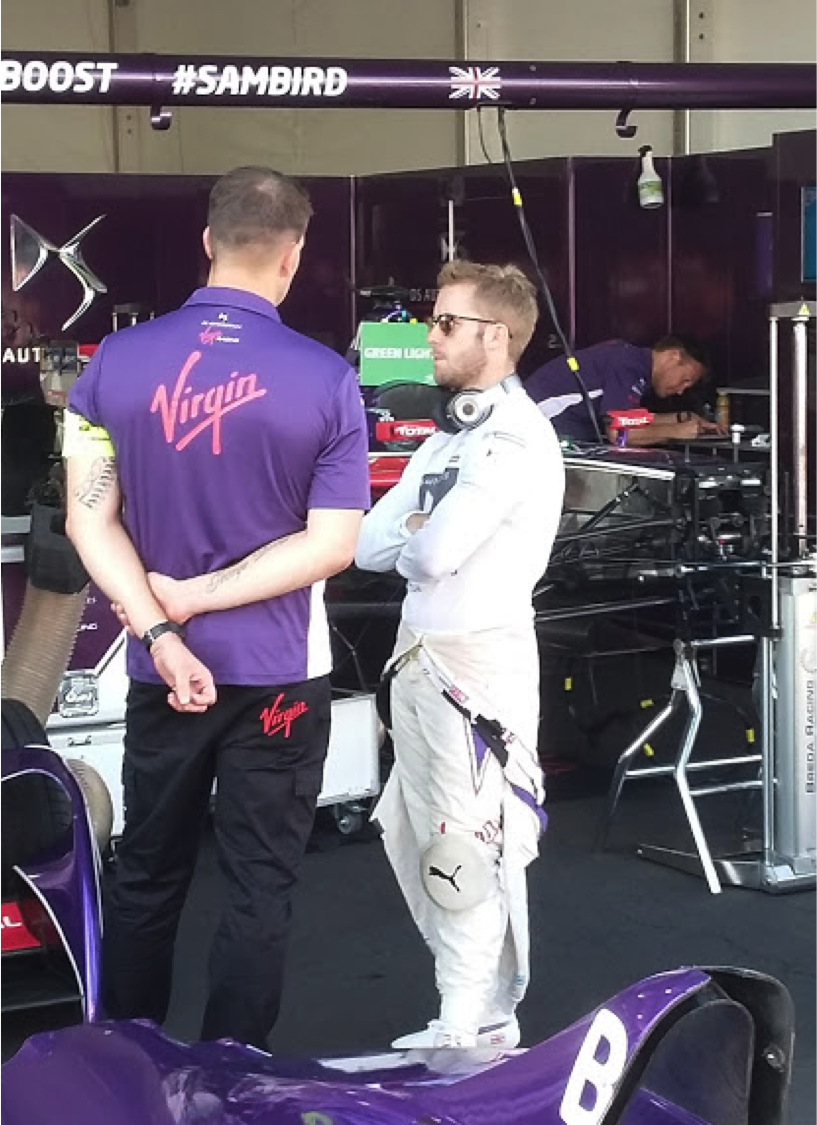
Sam Bird, pictured (right) in the paddock prior to Sunday qualifying, won both of the weekend's races.

When racing resumed, Bird kept first place and was ahead of both Mahindras. Di Grassi was seven seconds behind Gasly, and the two were separated by the yet-to-stop Frijns. Bird used the restart to increase his lead to three seconds over both Mahindras without overusing electrical energy. D'Ambrosio spun at the chicane; although his rear of his car was damaged, the rear wing remained intact. Félix da Costa steered to the inside of Duval, but spun at the first turn, falling behind Duval's teammate d'Ambrosio. Rosenqvist's team noticed his car had an energy readout issue, and they prompted teammate Heidfeld to overtake him for second on lap 36 to see whether he could draw closer to Bird and pass him. Rosenqvist quickly fell behind to allow his problem to be solved in a calmer environment. This allowed Bird to further increase his lead by a second. Piquet incurred a drive-through penalty because he had not served an earlier ten-second penalty—which was issued after an engine change—at his car swap. D'Ambrosio drove to the inside of teammate Duval entering the sixth turn, and passed him, allowing Félix da Costa to draw closer to both Dragon cars. One lap later, Félix da Costa braked later than Duval, but the two made contact at the first corner hairpin. The collision saw the imposition of a drive-through penalty on Félix da Costa.

Heidfeld allowed teammate Rosenqvist back through to second place on lap 48. Despite an oversteer in the race's final laps, Bird opened up a healthy advantage and crossed the start/finish line after 49 laps to earn his second victory of the season, his second in succession in New York City, and the fifth of his career. He was the first driver to win both races of a double header weekend since Prost at the 2016 London ePrix. Gasly caught the Mahindras of Rosenqvist and Heidfeld on the final lap, and all three drivers concertinaed through the final turn. While challenging Heidfeld for third, Gasly carried too much speed entering the final corner and drifted into a trackside wall. He hurled a detachable barrier on the circuit, which no other driver hit. Rosenqvist took second, with Heidfeld narrowly ahead of Gasly's damaged car. Di Grassi was fifth, Prost sixth, Dillmann seventh and Vergne eighth. Frijns's additional electrical energy allowed him to pass four cars on the final lap and took ninth. D'Ambrosio rounded out the top ten. Carroll, Sarrazin, Duval, Turvey, Félix da Costa and Piquet were the final finishers. There was one lead change during the race; two drivers reached the front of the field. Bird led once for a total of 29 laps, out of 49.

=== Post-race ===
The top three drivers appeared on the podium to collect their trophies and spoke to the media in a later press conference. Bird was euphoric with his second New York City win and paid tribute to the Virgin team for providing him with what he called "the best car" he had driven in his Formula E career: "What a car I was given this weekend. Blinding in qualifying, sensational on energy management in the race." He suggested pole position be moved to the right-hand side if Formula E returned to New York City, and did not rule out challenging for victories at the season's final race weekend in Montreal. Second-place finisher Rosenqvist stated he had not anticipated the strong form of the Virgin team but praised Bird's driving. He said that he was "thrilled" to return to the podium despite being overtaken by Bird after the first ten laps. Rosenqvist stated his feeling that this displayed his team's potential to win more races, and was looking forward to the season's final two ePrix. Heidfeld, who finished third, spoke of his enjoyment of the second race. Because of the problems affecting his teammate Rosenqvist, he said he made an effort to put pressure on Bird but wanted to drive more calmly following his suspension failure in the previous day's race.

In regards to the final lap collision with Gasly, Heidfeld said that he did not encourage Gasly to run on the inside, as he was attempting to remain close behind teammate Rosenqvist so there would be no space available to in which the latter could steer into: "For sure I didn’t touch him on purpose, and it’s a pity to finish like this, but at least we both made it over the line." Gasly claimed Heidfeld had placed him in a position to impact the wall following the latter releasing his brake pedal. Nevertheless, he described his weekend as "very positive", but did not anticipate his advancing into super pole after having just a day's worth of experience driving in the series: "We had a very busy schedule, especially with me arriving later on during the event. There was a lot to learn but we did great. We scored important points for the team. It was a great opportunity to discover a new discipline and I enjoyed the challenge very much." Félix da Costa spoke of his disagreement of the drive-through penalty he received from the stewards after his collision with Duval late in the race, something he said ended it competitively for him.

The result further reduced Buemi's Drivers' Championship advantage over di Grassi to ten points. Rosenqvist remained in third place on 104 points, and was four points ahead of Bird. Prost's sixth-place finish dropped him to fifth position. e.Dams-Renault increased their lead over Audi Sport ABT in the Teams' Championship to 65 points. Mahindra maintained third place on 182 points. With 153 points, Virgin consolidated fourth position and were 59 points ahead of Techeetah with two races left in the season. 20,000 people attended the race weekend. Di Grassi acknowledged his team did not have the pace to challenge for victories in both races, but believed he could improve his situation in the championship and focused on the final two rounds.

=== Standings after the race ===
- **Bold text** indicates who still had a theoretical chance of becoming Champion.

Drivers' Championship standings

+/–	Pos	Driver	Points
	1	(Switzerland) **Sébastien Buemi**	157
	2	(Brazil) **Lucas di Grassi**	147 (−10)
	3	(Sweden) **Felix Rosenqvist**	104 (−53)
1	4	(United Kingdom) **Sam Bird**	100 (−57)
1	5	(France) Nicolas Prost	84 (−73)

Teams' Championship standings

+/–	Pos	Team	Points
	1	(France) **e.Dams-Renault**	259
	2	(Germany) **Audi Sport ABT**	194 (−65)
	3	(India) **Mahindra**	182 (−77)
	4	(United Kingdom) Virgin-Citroën	153 (−106)
	5	(China) Techeetah-Renault	94 (−165)

- Notes: Only the top five positions are included for both sets of standings.

== Classification ==
=== Qualifying one ===
Final first qualifying classification
Pos.	No.	Driver	Team	GS	SP	Grid
1	37	(United Kingdom) Alex Lynn	Virgin-Citroën	1:03.009	1:03.296	1
2	66	(Germany) Daniel Abt	Audi Sport ABT	1:02.888	1:03.534	2
3	25	(France) Jean-Éric Vergne	Techeetah-Renault	1:03.091	1:03.537	3
4	2	(United Kingdom) Sam Bird	Virgin-Citroën	1:02.806	1:03.557	4
5	7	(Belgium) Jérôme d'Ambrosio	Dragon-Penske	1:02.881	1:07.203	5
6	23	(Germany) Nick Heidfeld	Mahindra	1:03.193	—N/a	6
7	3	(Brazil) Nelson Piquet Jr.	NextEV NIO	1:03.361	—N/a	7
8	88	(United Kingdom) Oliver Turvey	NextEV NIO	1:03.385	—N/a	8
9	8	(France) Nico Prost	e.Dams-Renault	1:03.433	—N/a	9
10	11	(Brazil) Lucas di Grassi	Audi Sport ABT	1:03.480	—N/a	10
11	33	(France) Stéphane Sarrazin	Techeetah-Renault	1:03.508	—N/a	11
12	6	(France) Loïc Duval	Dragon-Penske	1:03.521	—N/a	12
13	47	(United Kingdom) Adam Carroll	Jaguar	1:03.555	—N/a	13
14	20	(New Zealand) Mitch Evans	Jaguar	1:03.637	—N/a	14
15	4	(France) Tom Dillmann	Venturi	1:03.795	—N/a	15
16	27	(Netherlands) Robin Frijns	Andretti-BMW	1:03.830	—N/a	16
17	19	(Sweden) Felix Rosenqvist	Mahindra	1:04.300	—N/a	17
18	28	(Portugal) António Félix da Costa	Andretti-BMW	1:04.585	—N/a	18
19	9	(France) Pierre Gasly	e.Dams-Renault	1:04.936	—N/a	19
20	5	(Germany) Maro Engel	Venturi	1:17.591	—N/a	20

=== Race one ===
Drivers who scored championship points are denoted in bold.

Final first race classification
Pos.	No.	Driver	Team	Laps	Time/Retired	Grid	Points
1	**2**	**(United Kingdom) Sam Bird**	**Virgin-Citroën**	**43**	**52:29.275**	**4**	25
2	**25**	**(France) Jean-Éric Vergne**	**Techeetah-Renault**	**43**	**+1.354**	**3**	18
3	**33**	**(France) Stéphane Sarrazin**	**Techeetah-Renault**	**43**	**+4.392**	**11**	15
4	**11**	**(Brazil) Lucas di Grassi**	**Audi Sport ABT**	**43**	**+6.155**	**10**	12
5	**6**	**(France) Loïc Duval**	**Dragon-Penske**	**43**	**+8.428**	**12**	10
6	**88**	**(United Kingdom) Oliver Turvey**	**NextEV NIO**	**43**	**+8.952**	**8**	8
7	**9**	**(France) Pierre Gasly**	**e.Dams-Renault**	**43**	**+9.321**	**19**	6
8	**8**	**(France) Nico Prost**	**e.Dams-Renault**	**43**	**+10.036**	**9**	4
9	**27**	**(Netherlands) Robin Frijns**	**Andretti-BMW**	**43**	**+11.019**	**16**	2
10	**47**	**(United Kingdom) Adam Carroll**	**Jaguar**	**43**	**+12.073**	**13**	1
11	3	(Brazil) Nelson Piquet Jr.	NextEV NIO	43	+12.977	7	
12	28	(Portugal) António Félix da Costa	Andretti-BMW	43	+13.341	18	
13	4	(France) Tom Dillmann	Venturi	43	+16.337	15	
14	66	(Germany) Daniel Abt	Audi Sport ABT	42	Battery	2	
15	19	(Sweden) Felix Rosenqvist	Mahindra	42	+1 Lap	17	
Ret	23	(Germany) Nick Heidfeld	Mahindra	34	Wheel nut	6	
Ret	**5**	**(Germany) Maro Engel**	**Venturi**	**30**	**Engine**	**20**	1^{1}
Ret	**37**	**(United Kingdom) Alex Lynn**	**Virgin-Citroën**	**23**	**Driveshaft**	**1**	3^{2}
Ret	7	(Belgium) Jérôme d'Ambrosio	Dragon-Penske	22	Oil Pressure	5	
Ret	20	(New Zealand) Mitch Evans	Jaguar	18	Wheel	14	

Notes:

- **^1** — Three points for pole position.
- **^2** — One point for fastest lap.

=== Qualifying two ===
Final second qualifying classification
Pos.	No.	Driver	Team	GS	SP	Grid
1	2	(United Kingdom) Sam Bird	Virgin-Citroën	1:02.246	1:02.285	1
2	19	(Sweden) Felix Rosenqvist	Mahindra	1:02.164	1:02.322	2
3	25	(France) Jean-Éric Vergne	Techeetah-Renault	1:02.204	1:02.544	3
4	9	(France) Pierre Gasly	e.Dams-Renault	1:02.080	1:03.173	4
5	23	(Germany) Nick Heidfeld	Mahindra	1:02.372	1:03.210	5
6	5	(Germany) Maro Engel	Venturi	1:02.579	—N/a	6
7	88	(United Kingdom) Oliver Turvey	NextEV NIO	1:02.583	—N/a	7
8	66	(Germany) Daniel Abt	Audi Sport ABT	1:02.688	—N/a	8
9	11	(Brazil) Lucas di Grassi	Audi Sport ABT	1:02.720	—N/a	9
10	4	(France) Tom Dillmann	Venturi	1:02.807	—N/a	10
11	27	(Netherlands) Robin Frijns	Andretti-BMW	1:02.820	—N/a	19^{3}
12	33	(France) Stéphane Sarrazin	Techeetah-Renault	1:02.853	—N/a	11
13	20	(New Zealand) Mitch Evans	Jaguar	1:02.868	—N/a	12
14	7	(Belgium) Jérôme d'Ambrosio	Dragon-Penske	1:02.900	—N/a	13
15	8	(France) Nico Prost	e.Dams-Renault	1:03.038	—N/a	14
16	3	(Brazil) Nelson Piquet Jr.	NextEV NIO	1:03.184	—N/a	20^{4}
17	37	(United Kingdom) Alex Lynn	Virgin-Citroën	1:03.225	—N/a	15
18	28	(Portugal) António Félix da Costa	Andretti-BMW	1:03.330	—N/a	16
19	6	(France) Loïc Duval	Dragon-Penske	1:03.547	—N/a	17
20	47	(United Kingdom) Adam Carroll	Jaguar	1:03.594	—N/a	18

Notes:

- **^3** — Robin Frijns was demoted ten places because he changed his gearbox.
- **^4** — Nelson Piquet Jr. was demoted ten places because he changed his engine.

=== Race two ===
Drivers who scored championship points are denoted in bold.

Final second race classification
Pos.	No.	Driver	Team	Laps	Time/Retired	Grid	Points
1	**2**	**(United Kingdom) Sam Bird**	**Virgin-Citroën**	**49**	**58:09.388**	**1**	25+3^{5}
2	**19**	**(Sweden) Felix Rosenqvist**	**Mahindra**	**49**	**+11.381**	**2**	18
3	**23**	**(Germany) Nick Heidfeld**	**Mahindra**	**49**	**+12.319**	**5**	15
4	**9**	**(France) Pierre Gasly**	**e.Dams-Renault**	**49**	**+12.355/Accident**	**4**	12
5	**11**	**(Brazil) Lucas di Grassi**	**Audi Sport ABT**	**49**	**+23.451**	**9**	10
6	**8**	**(France) Nico Prost**	**e.Dams-Renault**	**49**	**+30.471**	**14**	8
7	**4**	**(France) Tom Dillmann**	**Venturi**	**49**	**+41.862**	**10**	6
8	**25**	**(France) Jean-Éric Vergne**	**Techeetah-Renault**	**49**	**+52.292**	**3**	4
9	**27**	**(Netherlands) Robin Frijns**	**Andretti-BMW**	**49**	**+60.475**	**19**	2
10	**7**	**(Belgium) Jérôme d'Ambrosio**	**Dragon-Penske**	**49**	**+72.659**	**14**	1
11	47	(United Kingdom) Adam Carroll	Jaguar	49	+101.134	18	
12	33	(France) Stéphane Sarrazin	Techeetah-Renault	48	+1 Lap	11	
13	6	(France) Loïc Duval	Dragon-Penske	48	+1 Lap	17	
14	88	(United Kingdom) Oliver Turvey	NextEV NIO	48	+1 Lap	7	
15	28	(Portugal) António Félix da Costa	Andretti-BMW	48	+1 Lap	16	
16	3	(Brazil) Nelson Piquet Jr.	NextEV NIO	46	+3 Laps	20	
Ret	5	(Germany) Maro Engel	Venturi	22	Electrical	6	
Ret	37	(United Kingdom) Alex Lynn	Virgin-Citroën	19	Gearbox	15	
Ret	**66**	**(Germany) Daniel Abt**	**Audi Sport ABT**	**18**	**Suspension**	**8**	1^{6}
Ret	20	(New Zealand) Mitch Evans	Jaguar	5	Transmission	12	

Notes:

- **^5** — Three points for pole position.
- **^6** — One point for fastest lap.

Previous race: 2017 Berlin ePrix	FIA Formula E Championship; 2016–17 season	Next race: 2017 Montreal ePrix
Previous race: N/A	New York City ePrix	Next race: 2018 New York City ePrix
