= 2017 Berlin ePrix =

Formula E races in 2017

Race 7 of 12 of the 2016–17 Formula E Championship
← Previous race	Next race →
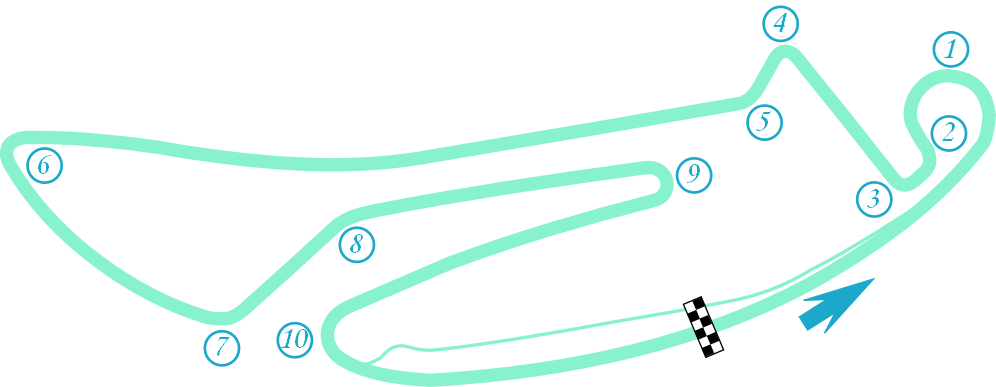

Race details
- Date: 10 June 2017
- Official name: 2017 FIA Formula E Berlin ePrix
- Location: Tempelhof Airport Street Circuit, Berlin, Germany
- Course: Street circuit
- Course length: 2.277 km (1.414 miles)
- Distance: 44 laps, 100.199 km (62.261 miles)
- Weather: Sunny; Air: 23.25 to 23.8 °C (73.85 to 74.84 °F), Track: 31 to 33.9 °C (87.8 to 93.0 °F)

Pole position
Driver	(Brazil) Lucas di Grassi	Audi Sport ABT
- Time: 1:08.312

Fastest lap
Driver	(New Zealand) Mitch Evans	Jaguar
- Time: 1:10.224 on lap 17

Podium
First	(Sweden) Felix Rosenqvist	Mahindra
Second	(Brazil) Lucas di Grassi	Audi Sport ABT
Third	(Germany) Nick Heidfeld	Mahindra

The 2017 Berlin ePrix (formally the 2017 FIA Formula E Berlin ePrix) were a pair of Formula E electric car races held on 10 and 11 June 2017 at the Tempelhof Airport Street Circuit in Berlin before a two-day crowd of 24,000 people. They were the seventh and eighth rounds of the 2016–17 Formula E Championship and the third Berlin ePrix. The 44-lap race contested on 10 June was won by Mahindra driver Felix Rosenqvist from a second place start. Lucas di Grassi finished second for Audi Sport ABT and Rosenqvist's teammate Nick Heidfeld was third. The longer 46-lap race on 11 June was won by e.Dams-Renault driver Sébastien Buemi from second place. Rosenqvist took second and di Grassi was third.

Di Grassi won the pole position for the first race by recording the fastest lap in qualifying and maintained the lead by gradually building a gap over Rosenqvist in the opening five laps but the latter steadily reduced it over the following laps to three-tenths of a second before the mandatory pit stops. Rosenqvist passed di Grassi for the lead on the 22nd lap and retained the position after switching into his second car. He opened up a two-second lead over di Grassi. who had battery temperature problems, and maintained it for the rest of the race to claim his first Formula E victory. There was one lead change among two different drivers during the course of the first race.

Rosenqvist secured the pole position for the second race and built up a large lead over Buemi that remained steady over the following 22 laps despite being required to manage his electrical energy consumption. Despite narrowly avoiding contact with teammate Heidfeld after being released from his garage, Rosenqvist kept the lead following the mandatory switch into a second car. Rosenqvist was immediately investigated by the stewards who imposed a ten-second time penalty on him. Rosenqvist finished first on the road but his time penalty gave Buemi his sixth victory of the season and the 12th of his career. There were no lead changes as Rosenqvist led every lap from start to finish.

The results of the races reduced Buemi's Drivers' Championship lead over di Grassi to 32 points. Rosenqvist advanced from sixth to third while Prost fell to fourth and Heidfeld dropped to fifth. e.Dams-Renault maintained their lead in the Teams' Championship on 229 points but it was reduced to 58 points ahead of Audi Sport ABT in second position. Mahindra consolidated third position with 147 points with four races remaining in the season.

== Background to race weekend ==
=== Preview ===
The Berlin ePrix was confirmed as part of Formula E's 2016–17 schedule in September 2016 by the FIA World Motor Sport Council. They were the seventh and eighth of twelve scheduled single-seater electric car races of the 2016–17 Championship, the third Berlin ePrix, the first of three double headers, and took place at the Tempelhof Airport Street Circuit in Berlin on 10 and 11 June 2017. It was confirmed as a double header in March 2017 following the cancellation of a planned race in Brussels because race organisers were unable to locate a suitable venue to hold the event, and the Berlin ePrix was moved away from the Karl-Marx-Allee Circuit in the city's downtown district, and back to Tempelhof, the location of the first German race in 2015. Other locations, such as the Kazak capital of Astana were considered, but the late switch made arrangements difficult.

Before the races, e.Dams-Renault driver Sébastien Buemi led the Drivers' Championship with 132 points, 43 ahead of Lucas di Grassi in second and a further 31 in front of third-placed Nico Prost. Nick Heidfeld was fourth on 47 points and Jean-Éric Vergne was fifth place with 40 points. e.Dams-Renault led the Teams' Championship with 190 points; Audi Sport ABT were in second with 115 points and Mahindra were 28 points behind in third position. Virgin were in fourth on 63 points and NextEV were 15 points behind in fifth.

After finishing well in the final two races, Felix Rosenqvist spoke of his aspiration to achieve more podium finishes with Mahindra, and at this late stage of the season, focused more on the championship, and no longer felt like a first year driver: "You have to try and take fewer risks to secure a strong result – especially with the double-headers. We have some great things coming from the team on the technical side, which is improving and both Nick and I are in the mix with those at the front of the grid." Buemi entered the race with the same perspective than he did in the past two races but was aware the track's concrete layout over the conventional asphalt used in past races but was ready to challenge for a points-scoring position. Di Grassi—nursing a right leg injury he sustained in a tackle during a charity football match at Stamford Bridge before the first race— said his team had the potential to draw closer to e.Dams-Renault in the championship if his team achieved "a perfect weekend".

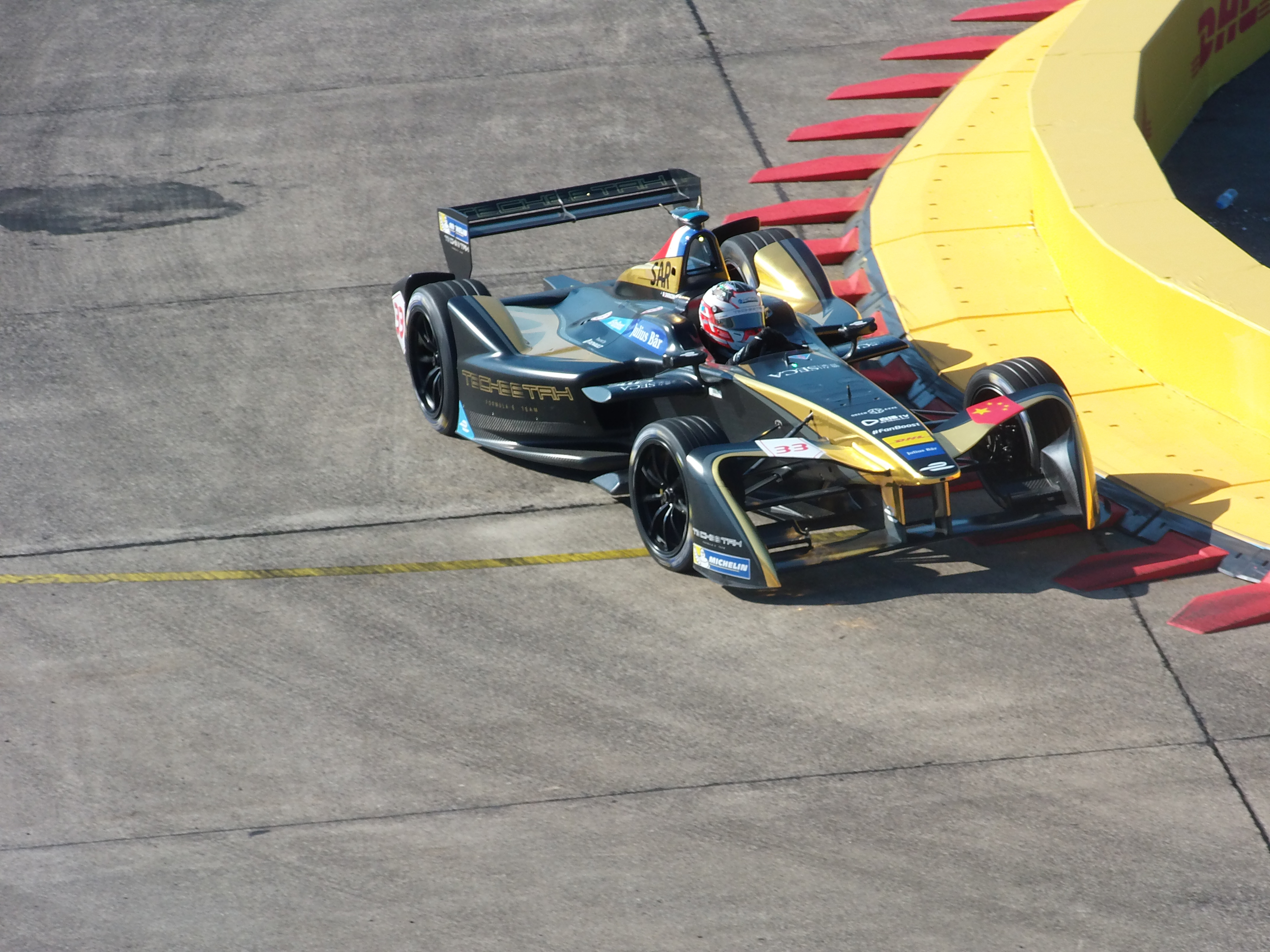
Stéphane Sarrazin switched to Techeetah following Esteban Gutiérrez's move into the IndyCar Series.

The Templehof circuit underwent changes following the 2015 race. The anti-clockwise layout, revealed on 27 March, was shortened and simplified to complement the faster, more efficient cars with the long main and back straights protruding from the rest of the circuit. The drivers received the changes positively with Jérôme d'Ambrosio stating his like of "a technical circuit" and it showed the series did not have to completely contest their races on the streets of the host city. Buemi reiterated the statement, feeling there were places on the track where overtaking would occur: "The team have done a great job learning from season 1, and taking the lessons we learned then and making a track that is better for racing cars." Construction of the track started on 29 May, 13 days before the first race.

There were two driver changes pre-race. Having driven with Venturi since the start of the championship, Stéphane Sarrazin was granted permission to leave the team and moved to Techeetah to replace Esteban Gutiérrez who focused on deputising for the injured Dale Coyne Racing driver Sébastien Bourdais in the IndyCar Series. Sarrazin's Venturi car was driven by the team's reserve driver and reigning Formula V8 3.5 Series champion Tom Dillmann for the rest of the season. (Note: Dillmann filled in for the absent Maro Engel in Paris where he finished eighth.) The switch was described by Gildo Pastor, the team principal of Venturi, as "a positive solution for all those involved": "With his experience, Stephane will be embraced by Techeetah and at the same time, the season will offer Tom the chance of gathering further important experience with Venturi."

=== Format of the races ===
Two practice sessions—both on Saturday and Sunday morning—were held before the respective day's late afternoon race. The first session ran for 45 minutes and the second for 30 minutes. Both the afternoon's qualifying sessions ran for 60 minutes and were divided into four groups of five cars. Each group was determined by a lottery system and was permitted six minutes of on-track activity. All drivers were limited to two timed laps with one at maximum power. The fastest five overall competitors in the four groups participated in a "Super Pole" session with one driver on the track at any time going out in reverse order from fifth to first. Each of the five drivers was limited to one timed lap and the starting order was determined by the competitor's fastest times (Super Pole from first to fifth, and group qualifying from sixth to twentieth). The driver and team who recorded the fastest time were awarded three points towards their respective championships. A special feature of Formula E is the "Fan Boost" feature, an additional 100 kilowatts (130 hp) of power to use in the driver's second car. The three drivers who were allowed to use the boost were determined by a fan vote.

== Race one ==
=== Practice and qualifying ===
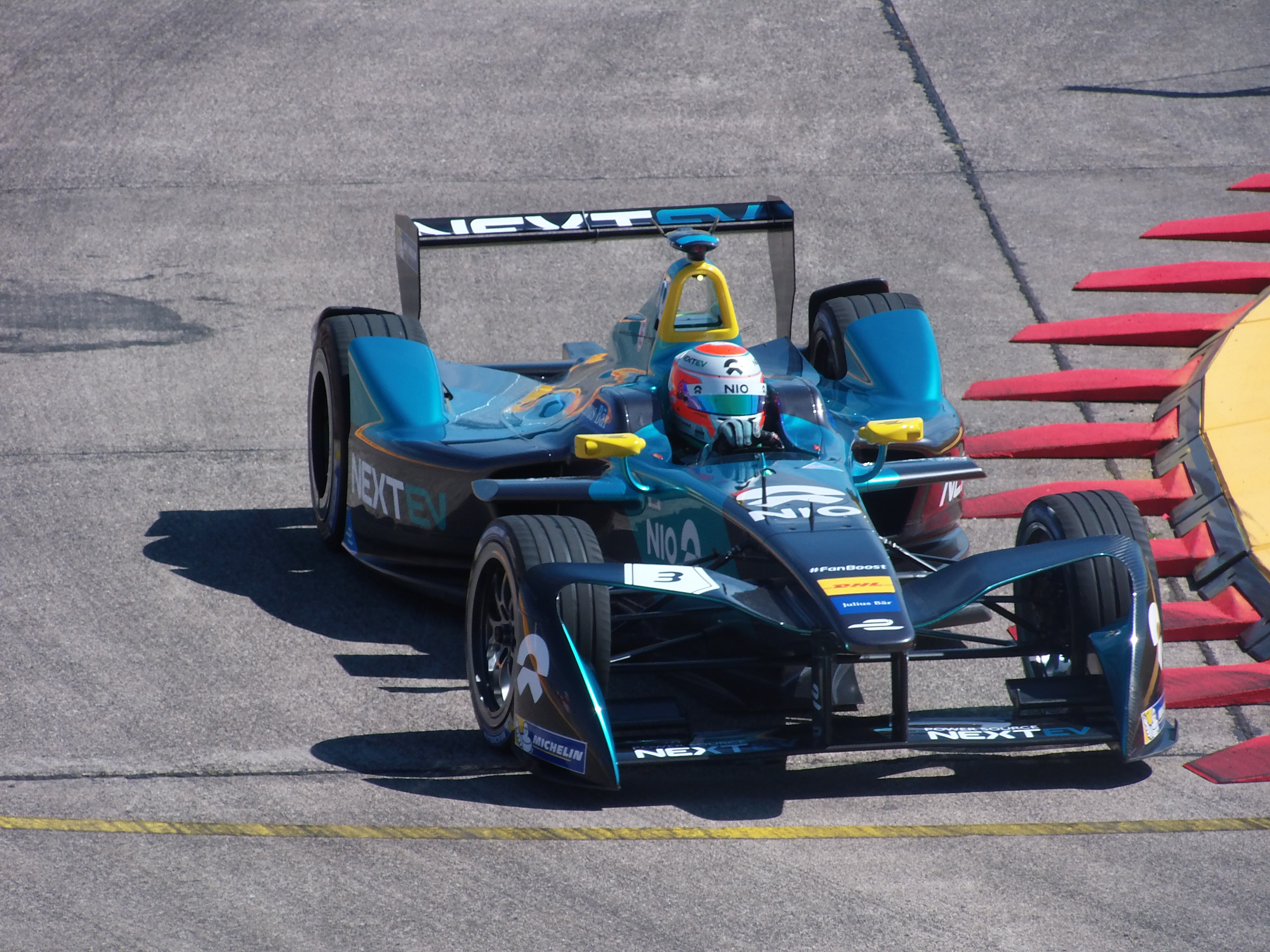
Nelson Piquet Jr. damaged his car in a crash at turn four in the first practice session.

Both practice sessions took place in warm weather. In the first practice session, Buemi used the maximum of 200 kW (270 hp) available to him and set the fastest lap of 1 minute, 8.151 seconds, almost six-tenths of a second faster than teammate Prost in second and Rosenqvist third. After leading the field for most of the session, José María López was fourth-fastest, ahead of Bird and Vergne, Mitch Evans, Heidfeld, di Grassi and Adam Carroll. Daniel Abt stopped at the turn three exit, and later understeered into the turn-one run-off area, but was able to continue driving. Nelson Piquet Jr. oversteered into the turn four barrier. damaging his car's left-front corner. The session was later halted when Evans was stranded on the inside of turn nine and was moved from the track after he could not drive. Dillmann's first car had gearbox problems and was required to wait for his second car to be ready before venturing out onto the circuit. Heidfeld was the fastest driver in the second practice session with a time of 1 minute, 8.070 seconds; his teammate Rosenqvist was second, ahead of Maro Engel in third. Di Grassi was fourth-fastest; Sarrazin, López, Bird, Vergne, Buemi and Oliver Turvey completed the top ten.

In the first group of five qualifiers, where drivers waited for the right time to set their lap times, Bird led the session despite an oversteer on his car, ahead of Abt and Robin Frijns. Carroll was fourth and António Félix da Costa was off the pace and was the first group's slowest qualifier. Vergne drove cleanly and was the fastest driver in the second group. He was ahead of Prost who lost time in the first third of a lap and d'Ambrosio. Engel and Loïc Duval were fourth and fifth. In the third group, Rosenqvist set the overall fastest lap time of any competitor in the group stages at 1 minute, 8.171 seconds. López was second-fastest, nearly two-tenths of a second slower with di Grassi third. Both Piquet and Evans were off the pace and were the third group's slowest two drivers; the latter made minor contact with the barrier on his maximum power lap. In the fourth group, Heidfeld was the fastest driver, nearly-three tenths of a second in front of Turvey, who was in turn, two-tenths ahead of Sarrazin. Buemi was the first driver to venture onto the track in group four but struggled on his maximum power lap with a large amount of oversteer, and Dillmann rounded out the top five qualifiers. At the end of group qualifying, the lap times set by Rosenqvist, Bird, Heidfeld, López and di Grassi progressed them to super pole. Di Grassi clinched the second pole position of his career with a lap of 1 minute, 8.312 seconds. He was joined on the grid's front row by López who recorded a lap time 0.001 seconds slower. The margin of gap was the closest in Formula E history. Rosenqvist clipped the turn nine kerb, causing him to lose momentum, and slid lightly through turn ten, leaving him third. Heidfeld qualified fourth, and Bird struggled for pace, going one second slower than di Grassi in the first sector, for fifth. Behind him, the rest of the grid order was Vergne, Turvey, Abt, Prost, d'Ambrosio, Engel, Sarrazin, Piquet, Buemi, Dillmann, Evans, Frijns, Carroll, Duval and Félix da Costa.

=== Race ===
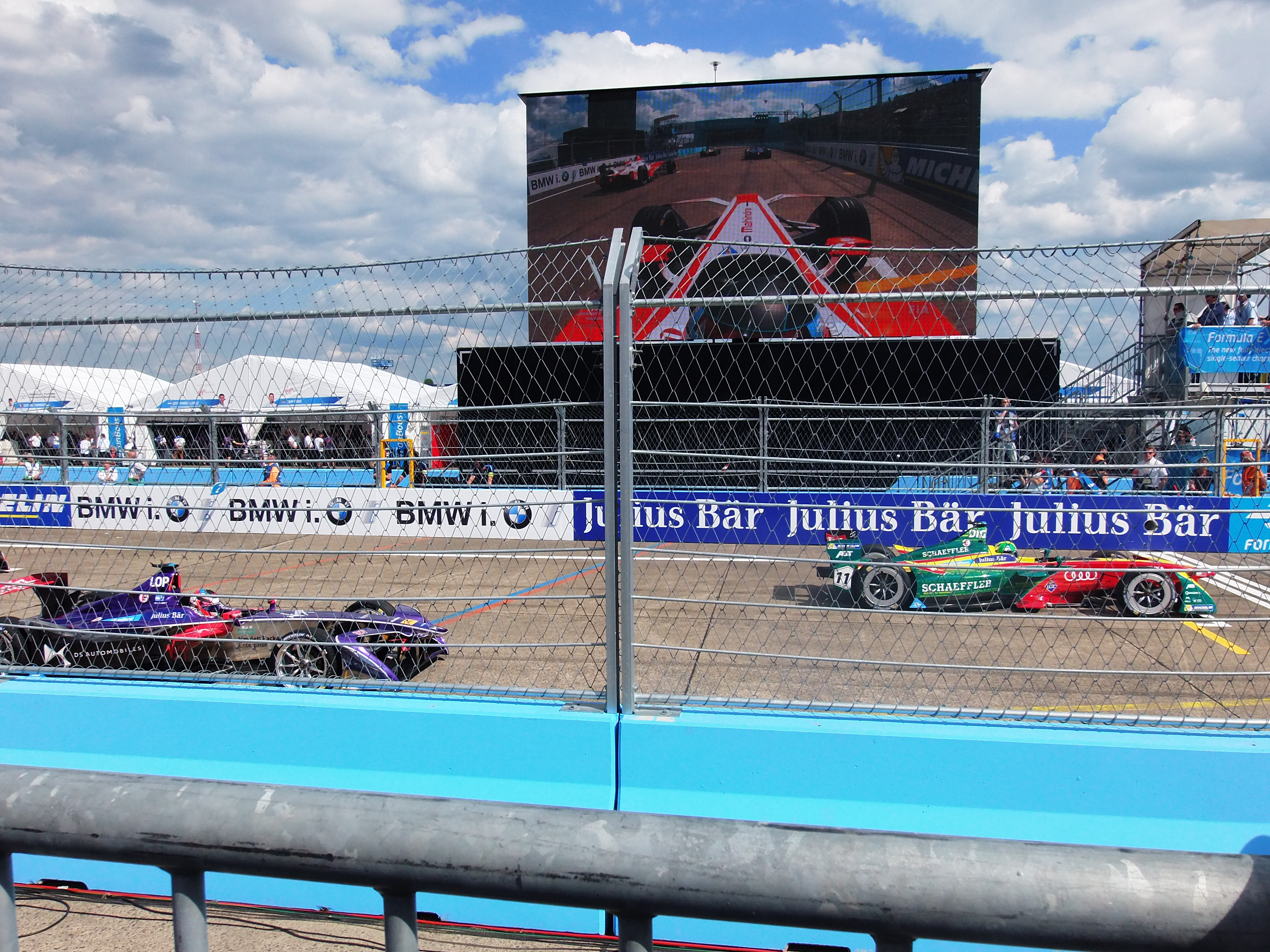
The start of the first race

The first race began at 16:00 Central European Summer Time (UTC+02:00). The weather at the start were dry and sunny with an air temperature between 23.25 to 23.8 °C (73.85 to 74.84 °F) and a track temperature ranging from 31 to 33.9 °C (87.8 to 93.0 °F). When the race started, di Grassi maintained the lead heading into the first corner. Mahindra teammates Rosenqvist and Heidfeld made fast starts and overtook the slow starting López for second and third respectively. Abt passed Vergne for sixth and Sarrazin overtook Piquet for 12th. Evans gained places through the first corner, but after the field bunched up in turns two and three, he was unsighted by Sarrazin who squeezed the Jaguar into the concrete barrier, breaking his suspension and damaging both rims. Buemi did not gain any positions and appeared to make contact with Piquet's car with a section of the NextEV's bodywork lodged in his car's open slot. At the end of the first lap, di Grassi led from Rosenqvist, Heidfeld, López, Bird, Abt, Vergne, Engel, Prost and Turvey.

Evans limped his damaged Jaguar back to the pit lane where he switched to his second car and his team refocused their efforts to setting the race's fastest lap. By the fifth lap, di Grassi held a 1.3-second lead over Rosenqvist with Heidfeld in third, ahead of the Virgin duo of López and Bird. Buemi gained one position by passing Sarrazin for 12th place at turn nine. Soon after, Buemi, di Grassi and Abt were announced as the winners of the first FanBoost vote. Dillmann incurred a drive-through penalty for overusing electrical energy. Rosenqvist required additional battery life to go a lap longer than di Grassi before his pit stop while Andretti teammates Félix da Costa and Frijns elected to make their stops later to try to gain positions and have more electrical energy to use for an attack for the final laps. Attention focused on Buemi who passed Turvey for tenth and Engel on the outside of turn nine for ninth place. At the front, Rosenqvist started to draw closer to di Grassi with his additional electrical energy while Heidfeld pulled away from López and Bird.

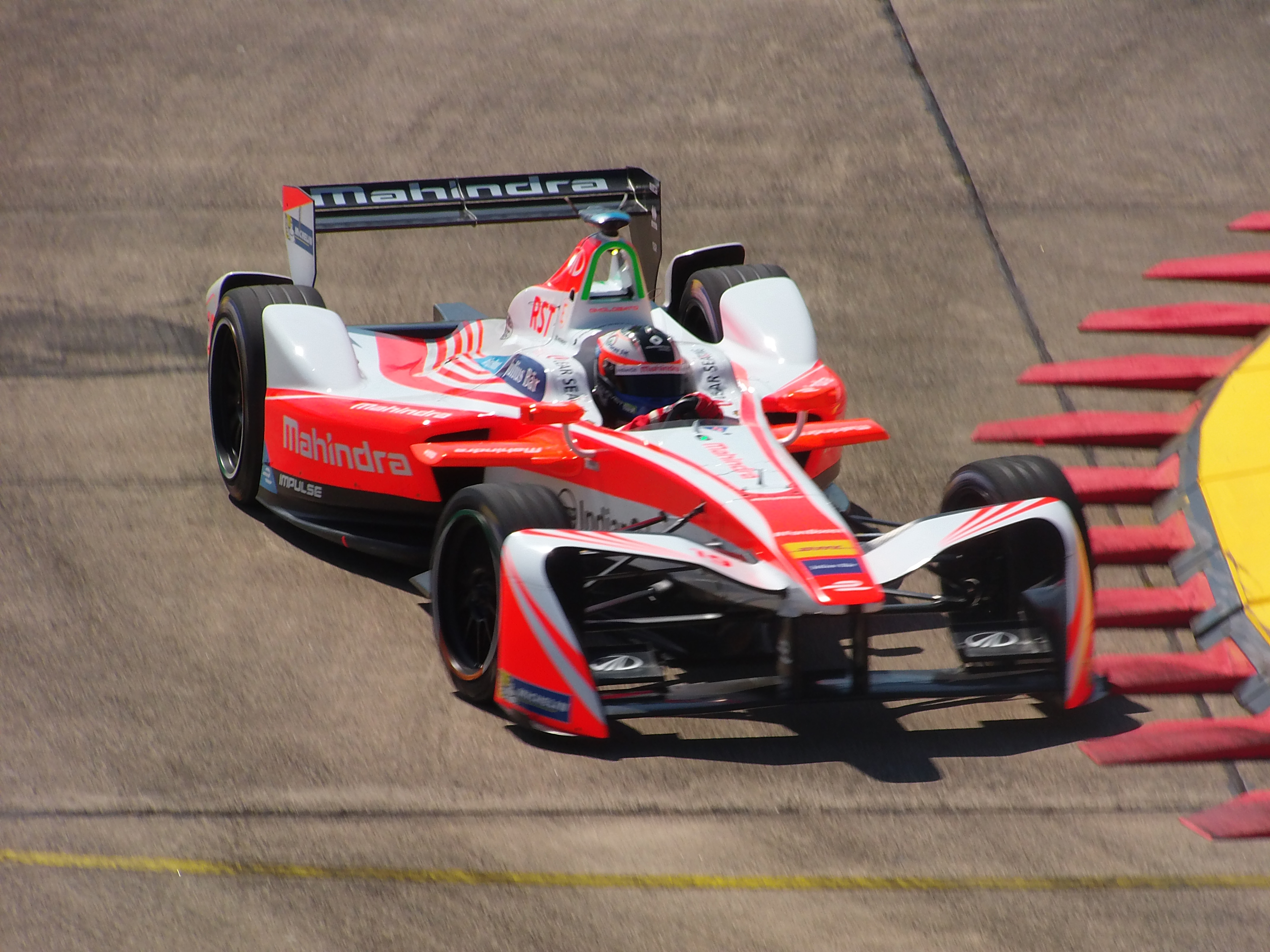
Felix Rosenqvist took his (and Mahindra's) first victory in Formula E.

Evans recorded the race's fastest lap of 1 minute, 10.224 seconds on lap 16, earning him one point. Entering the pit stop phase, Rosenqvist reduced di Grassi's lead to three-tenths of a second after the latter locked his tyres. Di Grassi lifted and coasted early, allowing Rosenqvist to pass him on the inside for the lead into the first corner on lap 22. The mandatory pit stops for drivers to change into a second car began at the conclusion of the lap when the top three drivers entered the pit lane. Rosenqvist rejoined the track in the lead with di Grassi second and Heidfeld third. Abt fell behind Prost in seventh while Bird lost three positions to emerge in eighth. Félix da Costa and Frijns's strategy did not work and fell to 18th and 19th. While di Grassi elected to hold back on using his FanBoost to attack Rosenqvist, Buemi overtook Abt for eight and began closing up to Bird. Despite gaining positions after the pit stops, Vergne was under investigation for being released into Dillmann's path. Meanwhile, Heidfeld started to draw closer to di Grassi with 15 laps left. Buemi braked later than Bird to pass him for seventh place on the inside of turn nine.

Entering the final laps, Buemi had closed up to Bird and teammate Prost; the latter did not defend as Buemi took over sixth place. Vergne was imposed a five-second time penalty for his pit stop release and Buemi responded by allowing Vergne to pull away slightly. Rosenqvist opened up a two-second lead over di Grassi, who had battery temperature issues. Rosenqvist's teammate Heidfeld had closed up to di Grassi who responded by using his FanBoost to defend second place. Rosenqvist maintained the lead and crossed the start/finish line after 44 laps to secure his and Mahindra's first victory in Formula E. Di Grassi finished second, 2.2 seconds behind, with Heidfeld securing his third consecutive third-place finish. López finished fourth, with Buemi fifth on the road. Prost, Abt and Bird were in the next three positions while Vergne's five-second time penalty dropped him from fifth to ninth. Engel was the last of the points-scoring finishers in tenth. Turvey, Sarrazin, Piquet, d'Ambrosio and Carroll, Duval, Félix da Costa and Frijns were the final drivers. There was one lead change in the race; two drivers reached the front of the field. Rosenqvist led once for a total of 23 laps, more than any other driver.

=== Post-race ===
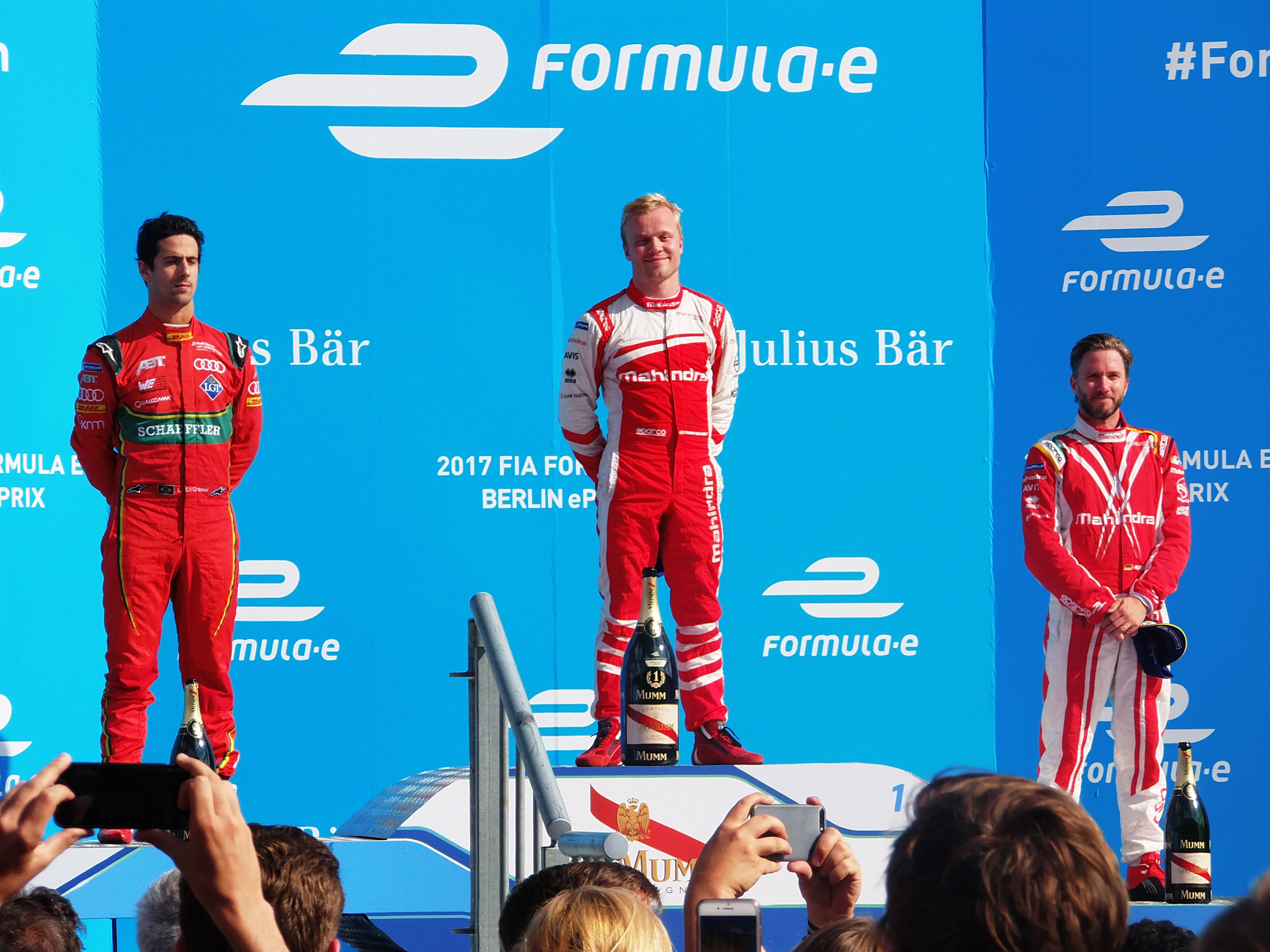
The top three finishers on the podium after the first race.

The top three drivers appeared on the podium to collect their trophies and spoke to the media in a later press conference. Rosenqvist said the result had been awaiting Mahindra for a long period of time and stated that he felt as if his team could win many races over the course of the season and the first Berlin race was an event that had "all the puzzle pieces came together." He added that despite small errors, he was still able to win: "We work so hard and you can really see the suffering sometimes but when you have days like this it's all worth it." Di Grassi stated his car was not satisfactory and Audi started the day "very lost" and made car set-up alterations: "If you look at the pure pace from the morning – this was not the best race for us, so I tried to hang on as much as I could." He revealed he lost regeneration from his overheating battery at the end of his first stint which persisted in his second stint. However di Grassi affirmed his team would improve his car and challenge for the victory in the following day's race. Third-place finisher Heidfeld said Mahindra's finish was "a really outstanding result" and stated he struggled in the first car but could mount a challenge to di Grassi in his second car.

Mahindra team principal Dilbagh Gill eulogised his team's maiden victory, calling it "a massive breakthrough for Mahindra and Indian sport" but stated the company would not get eager for more wins but believed further successes would come: "We knew it would happen soon because we have had increased confidence with multiple podiums. For some reason when I woke up this morning I knew we would win." After starting from 14th and finishing fifth, Buemi was disqualified after post-race scrutineering determined that all four tyres on both his cars were below the minimum mandated pressure of 1.60-bar (160 kPa) set by control tyre supplier Michelin, causing him to be in breach of Formula E's sporting regulations. Buemi's disqualification promoted teammate Prost, Bird, Vergne and Engel by one place and Turvey moved to tenth. e.Dams-Renault co-owner Alain Prost admitted it was an error by the team but stated their task was to improve for the following day's race and allow Buemi to remain in championship contention. Buemi spoke of his disappointment in the outcome but said he would remain focused and return stronger in the second race.

The result kept Buemi in the lead of the Drivers' Championship with 132 points but his disqualification reduced his lead over di Grassi to 22 points. Prost remained in third place on 68 points with race winner Rosenqvist moving from sixth to fourth. Heidfeld fell to fifth three points in arrears of his teammate. e.Dams-Renault still led the Teams' Championship but Audi Sport ABT moved to within 56 points of the French team. Mahindra consolidated third place with 127 points while Virgin maintained fourth position and moved a further 17 points ahead of NextEV with five races left in the season.

=== Standings after the race ===
- **Bold text** indicates who still had a theoretical chance of becoming Champion.

Drivers' Championship standings

+/–	Pos	Driver	Points
	1	(Switzerland) **Sébastien Buemi**	132
	2	(Brazil) **Lucas di Grassi**	110 (−22)
	3	(France) **Nico Prost**	68 (−64)
2	4	(Sweden) **Felix Rosenqvist**	65 (−67)
1	5	(Germany) **Nick Heidfeld**	52 (−80)

Teams' Championship standings

+/–	Pos	Team	Points
	1	(France) **e.Dams-Renault**	200
	2	(Germany) **Audi Sport ABT**	144 (−56)
	3	(India) **Mahindra**	127 (−73)
	4	(United Kingdom) **Virgin-Citroën**	81 (−121)
	5	(China) **NextEV NIO**	49 (−151)

- Notes: Only the top five positions are included for both sets of standings.

== Race two ==
2017 Berlin ePrix
Race 8 of 12 of the 2016–17 Formula E Championship
← Previous race	Next race →
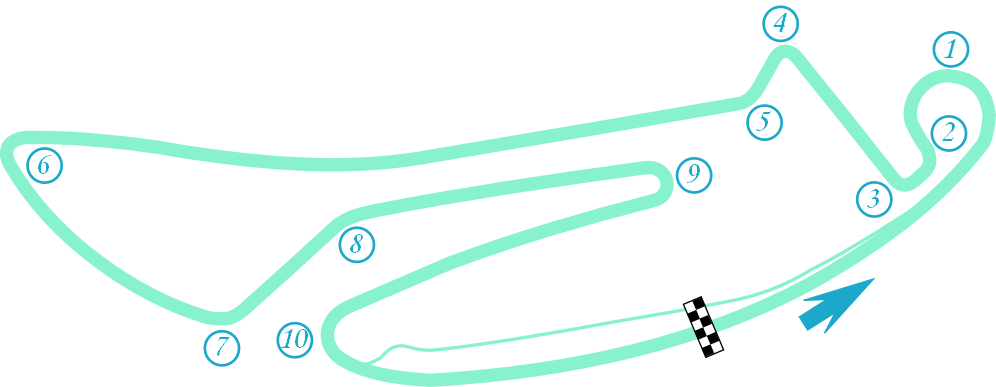

Race details
- Date: 11 June 2017
- Official name: 2017 FIA Formula E Berlin ePrix
- Location: Tempelhof Airport Street Circuit, Berlin, Germany
- Course: Street circuit
- Course length: 2.277 km (1.41 miles)
- Distance: 46 laps, 104.699 km (65.057 miles)
- Weather: Sunny: Air; 28.2 to 29.25 °C (82.76 to 84.65 °F), Track; 31.6 to 33.35 °C (88.88 to 92.03 °F)

Pole position
Driver	(Sweden) Felix Rosenqvist	Mahindra
- Time: 1:08.208

Fastest lap
Driver	(Germany) Maro Engel	Venturi
- Time: 1:09.519 on lap 7

Podium
First	(Switzerland) Sébastien Buemi	e.Dams-Renault
Second	(Sweden) Felix Rosenqvist	Mahindra
Third	(Brazil) Lucas di Grassi	Audi Sport ABT

=== Practice and qualifying ===
Both practice sessions were held in warm weather. Buemi was the only driver to utilise the full 200 kW (270 hp) available to him and recorded the fastest lap of the first practice session at 1 minute, 7.712 seconds, which had no major incidents apart from minor contact with the barriers, more than one second faster than Engel in second. López, Di Grassi, Rosenqvist, Vergne, Bird, Heidfeld, Sarrazin and Prost followed in the top ten. López set an early benchmark lap with the maximum amount of power available to him in the second session and remained fastest with a time of 1 minute, 7.670 seconds; Rosenqvist was 0.083 seconds off his pace in second. Buemi, Bird, Abt, Vergne, Prost, Turvey, di Grassi and Engel occupied positions three to ten.

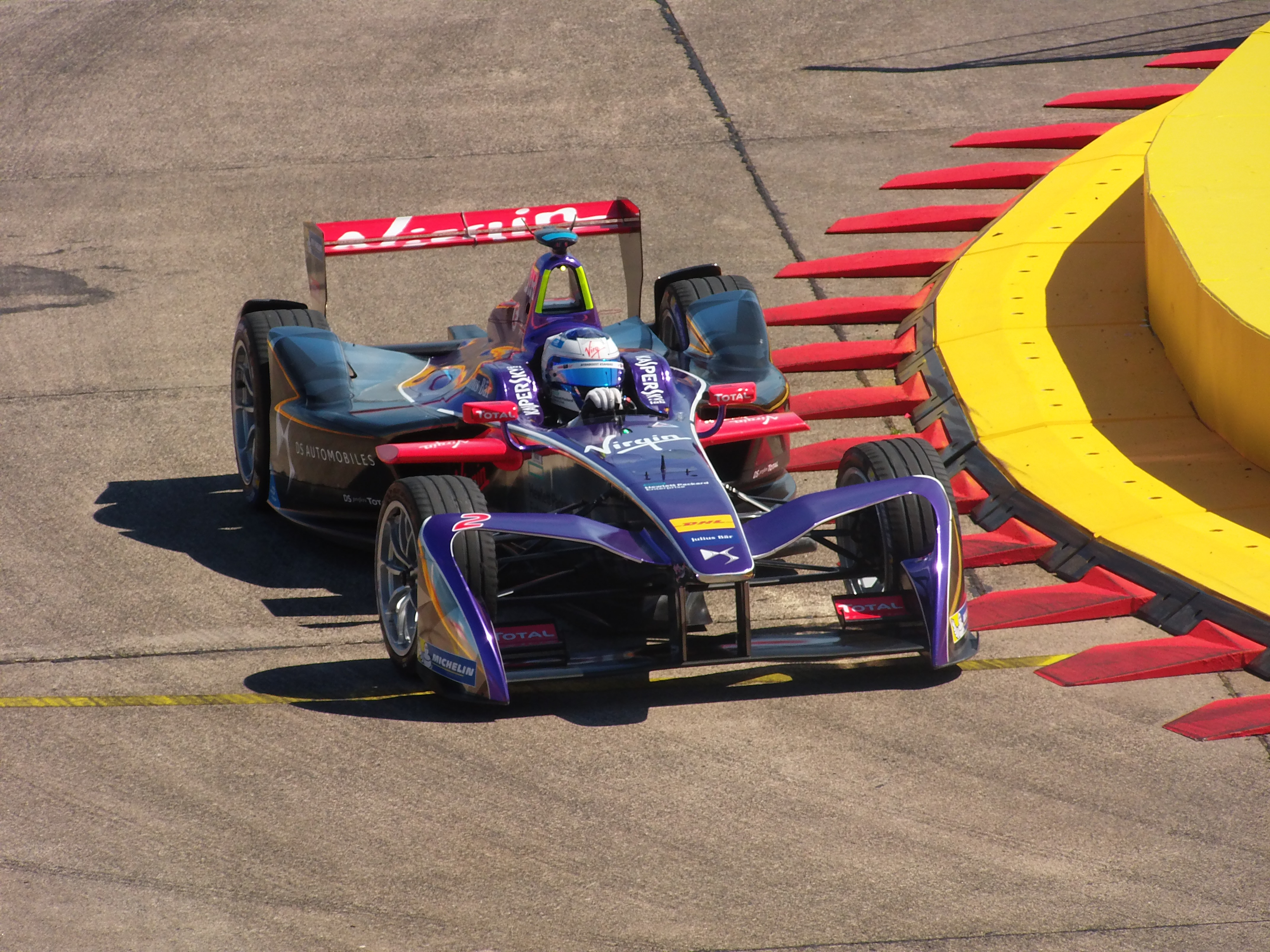
Sam Bird qualified fourth for the second race after losing time in the track's second sector.

Qualifying took place in warm weather. In the first group of five drivers, where they all elected to take time to increase tyre temperature, Rosenqvist paced the session, half a second faster than second-placed Engel and Sarrazin was third. Piquet was fourth-fastest, while Heidfeld was affected by a throttle sensor malfunction that prevented him from recording a maximum power lap. After completing his lap, Heidfeld stopped his car on the track to rectify the problem which caused him to start from 20th. Buemi drove cleanly was the fastest driver in the second group; Abt was 0.013 seconds slower than Buemi in second and Prost third. Dillmann and Carroll (who missed the turn nine apex) were the slowest drivers of the second group. In the third group, López recorded the fastest time, ahead of Turvey and di Grassi. Evans took fourth and Félix da Costa rounded out the top five. Despite losing time in the second sector, Bird set the fastest overall time of any competitor in the group qualifying stages in the fourth group at 1 minute, 7.805 seconds. Vergne was second-fastest, ahead of the Dragon duo of Duval and d'Ambrosio. Frijns was the slowest driver in the fourth group, and at the end of group qualifying, the times set by Bird, López, Vergne, Buemi and Rosenqvist advanced them to super pole. Rosenqvist clinched the second position of his career with a lap of 1 minute, 8.208 seconds despite driving an oversteering car. He was joined on the grid's front row by Buemi. López struggled with wheelspin, and lost time with oversteer entering turn six, restricting him to third. Bird was close to Rosenqvist's pace in the first sector, but took fourth after drifting slightly through turn seven. A handling imbalance left Vergne with an oversteer and persistent brake locking, causing him to start from fifth place. The rest of the field lined up as Turvey, di Grassi, Abt, Evans, Prost, Duval, d'Ambrosio, Engel, Frijns, Dillmann, Sarrazin, Félix da Costa, Piquet, Carroll and Heidfeld.

=== Race ===
The weather at the start were dry and sunny with an air temperature between 28.2 to 29.25 °C (82.76 to 84.65 °F) and a track temperature ranging from 31.6 to 33.35 °C (88.88 to 92.03 °F). When the second race began at 16:00 local time, Rosenqvist maintained the lead into the first turn. Buemi, behind remained in second position. Both Virgin cars of López and Bird drove alongside each other entering the first corner but López stopped his teammate from moving into third place. Rosenqvist managed to build a significant gap over Buemi by the time they left the turn three chicane. As the field went three abreast, Engel attempted to pass Duval around the outside at turn six but was unsighted by the Dragon vehicle and the two cars collided. Sections of Engel's front suspension were bent and he made an unscheduled pit stop to repair his car. Heidfeld gained five positions by the end of the first lap, while Duval lost nine places over the same distance. At the end of the first lap, Rosenqvist led Buemi by two seconds, who was followed in turn by López, Bird, Vergne, Turvey, di Grassi, Abt, Prost, Evans.

Turvey had energy management problems and was overtaken by both Audi Sport ABT cars of di Grassi and Abt on lap four. Prost closed up to Turvey and passed him for eighth place soon after. Heidfeld continued to gain positions, passing the Andretti cars of Félix da Costa and Frijns to move into 12th place. Rosenqvist was lapping four seconds faster than his teammate Heidfeld and their engineers radioed the teammates to lift and coast for energy preservation. Heidfeld used much of his electrical energy to draw closer to d'Ambrosio. Engel set the race's fastest lap of circuit in 1 minute, 9.519 seconds on lap seven, earning him one point. Soon after, Buemi, di Grassi and Abt were announced as the winners of the second FanBoost vote. Tyre rubber started to accumulate on the outer limits of the track's barriers, causing one driver to make contact with the wall. By the 13th lap, Heidfeld was closing up to Evans for tenth. At the front, Rosenqvist and Buemi had pulled away from López with the two separated by one second. López was being challenged by teammate Bird for third position but the latter had difficulty in overtaking him.

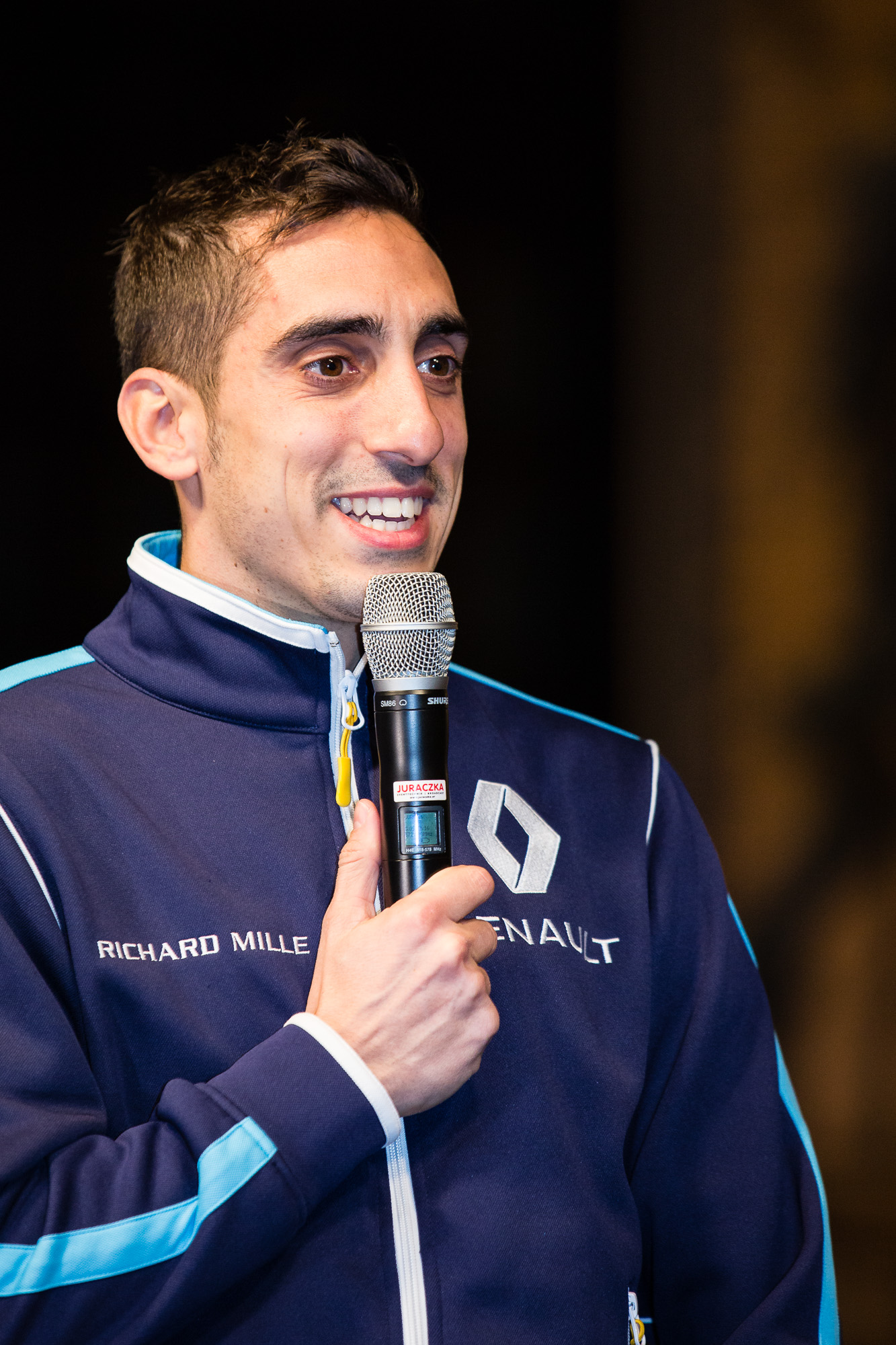
Sébastien Buemi secured his 12th career victory after Rosenqvist was penalised ten seconds for an unsafe pit stop release.

On lap 17, Bird attempted to overtake López before the first turn, but the two cars made contact in the corner, causing Bird to run wide. Bird fell to sixth after Vergne and di Grassi passed him and was placed under pressure by Abt. Bird lost two further positions when Abt and Prost passed him and López fell to fourth when Vergne overtook him. Di Grassi passed López entering the first corner soon after. Buemi was 1.3 seconds behind race leader Rosenqvist by the 20th lap but the latter was aware of the situation and glanced at his rear-view mirrors to ensure he had large enough of a gap to remain ahead after the pit stop phase. The mandatory pit stop phase for the switch into a second car began on lap 23 when the leaders entered the pit lane. After driving out of his team's garage in his second car, Rosenqvist was released into the path of Heidfeld in the other Mahindra car, causing his teammate to swerve to the outside and nearly entered another team's pit gantry. Heidfeld stopped without damaging his car. Although he was briefly delayed, Rosenqvist kept the lead. The stewards immediately investigated Rosenqvist for the pit stop release.

Aware of the possible implications, Rosenqvist pulled away to build a steady advantage over Buemi. Evans's team forgot to change the gear in his second car, delaying his exit from his garage as he required additional time to get into the correct gear. This caused him to emerge at the back of the field in 18th position. As the field became comfortable in the second half, di Grassi began to challenge Vergne for third. Following aggressive defensive manoeuvres which drew a verbal warning from his team, Vergne narrowly avoided hitting di Grassi at the final turn. Vergne was put off the racing line under braking by di Grassi who overtook him for third at the first corner on lap 32. Abt activated his FanBoost to try to pass Vergne on the next lap but was unsuccessful. Contact prevented Abt from overtaking Vergne, but not long after, passed him for fourth place. Duval stopped on the circuit but later drove his car into the pit lane to retire.

Having reviewed Rosenqvist's pit stop release, the stewards imposed a ten-second time penalty on him during lap 34. López lined up a pass on Vergne and overtook him on the outside braking for turn nine for fifth position six laps later. Vergne became vulnerable from attack from Bird, but stopped battling him after Vergne continued to aggressively defend sixth place. Unhindered in the closing stages of the race, Rosenqvist crossed the start/finish line after 46 laps to finish first on the road, 2.9 seconds ahead of Buemi. With the application of Rosenqvist's ten-second time penalty, Buemi inherited the victory. Di Grassi was a further 3.6 seconds behind in third. Abt, López, Vergne, Bird, Prost, Turvey and Heidfeld rounded out the top ten. Félix da Costa, Piquet, d'Ambrosio, Sarrazin and Dillmann, Carroll, Evans and Frijns were the final finishers. It was Buemi's sixth victory of the season and the twelfth of his career. There were no lead changes as Rosenqvist was the only driver to lead every lap of the race.

=== Post-race ===
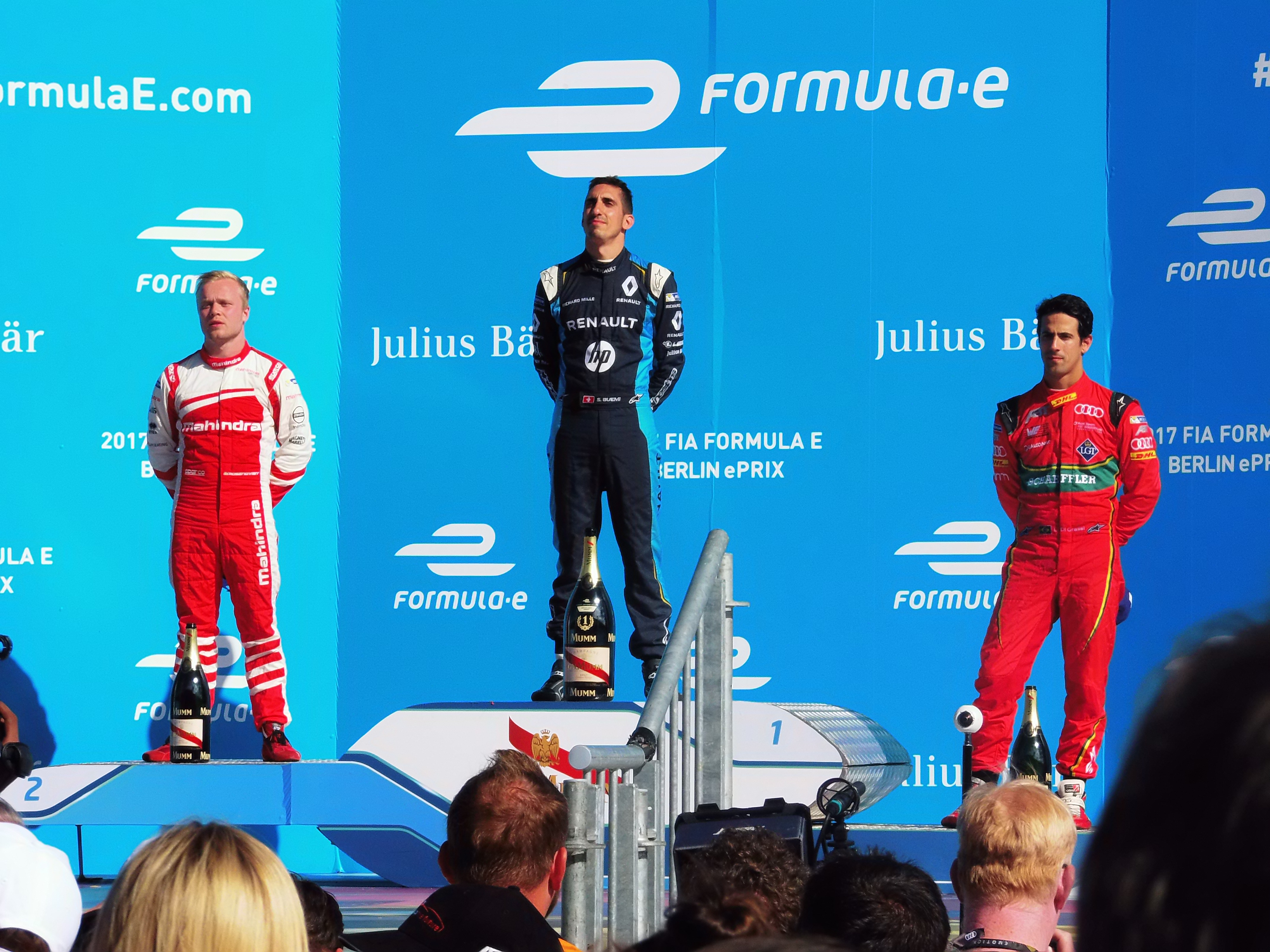
The top three finishers on the podium after the second race

The top three drivers appeared on the podium to collect their trophies and spoke to the media in a later press conference. On the way back to pit lane, Buemi declared his satisfaction over his success to commentator Dario Franchitti but he admitted the victory was handed to him "on a plate". He stated he felt Rosenqvist was the deserving victor but was happy with the pace of his car: "I think we were more or less the same pace [as Rosenqvist]. I’m very happy with that result, it just tastes a little bit different than normal." Rosenqvist spoke of his belief in the short-term he would look back at the weekend positively for himself and Mahindra but was "disappointed" to finish second: "Today, we were under pressure from Sébastien, we knew that we would be close as they looked very strong compared to yesterday. I knew that I had to drive a perfect race, every corner we had to drive perfect. I think we did a great job." Third-place finisher di Grassi said he enjoyed his battle against Vergne and claimed his car was quicker than in the second race due to speed his team extricated from it the previous day: "There is still a couple of tenths we need to find to be able to fight [for the win]."

Rosenqvist was confused over the ten-second time penalty for his pit stop release, which had him narrowly avoid hitting his teammate Heidfeld, saying he realised his teammate was entering the pit lane and applied his brakes to allow for an overtake: "I feel like I was always behind and it was not really my fault. That's why I'm a bit confused why I got the penalty." Mahindra was also fined €1,500 for unsafely releasing Heidfeld from his garage and into the path of Piquet. Dilbagh Gill described Heidfeld's rise up the field to finish tenth as a "master class in wheel-to-wheel racing" and said his team would look forward to preparing for the season's final races. Heidfeld called the result "bittersweet" as he stated his strong form meant had his sensor problem emerged in qualifying he could have finished in a higher position. Rosenqvist believed his team's strong pace in Berlin would allow him to increase his advantage over Prost in the Drivers' Championship: "It was a very long and tough weekend! We kept our heads together and had a near-perfect run. We had a really, really solid car. We are the ones to watch at the moment – it’s a bit of a game changer!"

The result meant Buemi remained the Drivers' Championship leader on 157 points, increasing his advantage over di Grassi to 32 points. Rosenqvist's second-place finish advanced him into the third position with 86 points. Prost fell to fourth place on 72 points and was nine points ahead of fifth-placed Heidfeld. e.Dams-Renault increased their Teams' Championship advantage to 58 points ahead of Audi Sport ABT. Mahindra consolidated third on 149 points. Virgin remained in fourth position with 97 points and Techeetah passed NextEV for fifth place with four races left in the season. 24,000 people attended the race weekend. Despite his lead, Buemi lamented he could have left Berlin with the same advantage before the ePrix and sought an arrangement with his team to enter in the New York City ePrix which clashed with another racing event he was due to attend.

=== Standings after the race ===
- **Bold text** indicates who still had a theoretical chance of becoming Champion.

Drivers' Championship standings

+/–	Pos	Driver	Points
	1	(Switzerland) **Sébastien Buemi**	157
	2	(Brazil) **Lucas di Grassi**	125 (−32)
1	3	(Sweden) **Felix Rosenqvist**	86 (−71)
1	4	(France) **Nico Prost**	72 (−85)
	5	(Germany) **Nick Heidfeld**	63 (−94)

Teams' Championship standings

+/–	Pos	Team	Points
	1	(France) **e.Dams-Renault**	229
	2	(Germany) **Audi Sport ABT**	171 (−58)
	3	(India) **Mahindra**	149 (−80)
	4	(United Kingdom) **Virgin-Citroën**	97 (−132)
1	5	(China) **Techeetah-Renault**	57 (−172)

- Notes: Only the top five positions are included for both sets of standings.

== Classification ==
=== Qualifying one ===
Final first qualifying classification
Pos.	No.	Driver	Team	GS	SP	Grid
1	11	(Brazil) Lucas di Grassi	Audi Sport ABT	1:08.387	1:08.312	1
2	37	(Argentina) José María López	Virgin-Citroën	1:08.349	1:08.313	2
3	19	(Sweden) Felix Rosenqvist	Mahindra	1:08.171	1:08.395	3
4	23	(Germany) Nick Heidfeld	Mahindra	1:08.325	1:08.650	4
5	2	(United Kingdom) Sam Bird	Virgin-Citroën	1:08.321	1:09.724	5
6	25	(France) Jean-Éric Vergne	Techeetah-Renault	1:08.457	—N/a	6
7	88	(United Kingdom) Oliver Turvey	NextEV NIO	1:08.607	—N/a	7
8	66	(Germany) Daniel Abt	Audi Sport ABT	1:08.620	—N/a	8
9	8	(France) Nico Prost	e.Dams-Renault	1:08.692	—N/a	9
10	7	(Belgium) Jérôme d'Ambrosio	Dragon-Penske	1:08.825	—N/a	10
11	5	(Germany) Maro Engel	Venturi	1:08.846	—N/a	11
12	33	(France) Stéphane Sarrazin	Techeetah-Renault	1:08.890	—N/a	12
13	3	(Brazil) Nelson Piquet Jr.	NextEV NIO	1:08.961	—N/a	13
14	9	(Switzerland) Sébastien Buemi	e.Dams-Renault	1:09.010	—N/a	14
15	4	(France) Tom Dillmann	Venturi	1:09.214	—N/a	15
16	20	(New Zealand) Mitch Evans	Jaguar	1:09.219	—N/a	16
17	27	(Netherlands) Robin Frijns	Andretti-BMW	1:09.630	—N/a	17
18	47	(United Kingdom) Adam Carroll	Jaguar	1:09.898	—N/a	18
19	6	(France) Loïc Duval	Dragon-Penske	1:09.923	—N/a	19
20	28	(Portugal) António Félix da Costa	Andretti-BMW	1:11.147	—N/a	20

=== Race one ===
Drivers who scored championship points are denoted in bold.

Final race one classification
Pos.	No.	Driver	Team	Laps	Time/Retired	Grid	Points
1	**19**	**(Sweden) Felix Rosenqvist**	**Mahindra**	**44**	**53:19.661**	**3**	25
2	**11**	**(Brazil) Lucas di Grassi**	**Audi Sport ABT**	**44**	**+2.232**	**1**	18+3^{2}
3	**23**	**(Germany) Nick Heidfeld**	**Mahindra**	**44**	**+4.058**	**4**	15
4	**37**	**(Argentina) José María López**	**Virgin-Citroën**	**44**	**+13.638**	**2**	12
5	**8**	**(France) Nico Prost**	**e.Dams-Renault**	**44**	**+19.068**	**9**	10
6	**66**	**(Germany) Daniel Abt**	**Audi Sport ABT**	**44**	**+19.799**	**8**	8
7	**2**	**(United Kingdom) Sam Bird**	**Virgin-Citroën**	**44**	**+20.065**	**5**	6
8	**25**	**(France) Jean-Éric Vergne**	**Techeetah-Renault**	**44**	**+20.689^{3}**	**6**	4
9	**5**	**(Germany) Maro Engel**	**Venturi**	**44**	**+39.030**	**11**	2
10	**88**	**(United Kingdom) Oliver Turvey**	**NextEV NIO**	**44**	**+40.985**	**7**	1
11	33	(France) Stéphane Sarrazin	Techeetah-Renault	44	+42.682	12	
12	3	(Brazil) Nelson Piquet Jr.	NextEV NIO	44	+42.880	13	
13	7	(Belgium) Jérôme d'Ambrosio	Dragon-Penske	44	+45.712	10	
14	47	(United Kingdom) Adam Carroll	Jaguar	44	+49.658	18	
15	6	(France) Loïc Duval	Dragon-Penske	44	+59.010	19	
16	28	(Portugal) António Félix da Costa	Andretti-BMW	44	+60.269	20	
17	27	(Netherlands) Robin Frijns	Andretti-BMW	44	+62.463	17	
18	4	(France) Tom Dillmann	Venturi	44	+67.695	15	
Ret	**20**	**(New Zealand) Mitch Evans**	**Jaguar**	**16**	**Suspension/Collision**	**16**	1^{2}
DSQ	9	(Switzerland) Sébastien Buemi	e.Dams-Renault	44	Excluded^{4}	14	

Notes:

- **^1** — Three points for pole position.
- **^2** — One point for fastest lap.
- **^3** — Jean-Éric Vergne had five seconds added to his race time for an unsafe pit stop release.
- **^4** — Sébastien Buemi was disqualified because all four tyres on both his cars were under the minimum mandated pressure.

=== Qualifying two ===
Final second qualifying classification
Pos.	No.	Driver	Team	GS	SP	Grid
1	19	(Sweden) Felix Rosenqvist	Mahindra	1:08.035	1:08.208	1
2	9	(Switzerland) Sébastien Buemi	e.Dams-Renault	1:08.022	1:08.306	2
3	37	(Argentina) José María López	Virgin-Citroën	1:07.854	1:08.454	3
4	2	(United Kingdom) Sam Bird	Virgin-Citroën	1:07.805	1:08.688	4
5	25	(France) Jean-Éric Vergne	Techeetah-Renault	1:07.993	1:09.103	5
6	88	(United Kingdom) Oliver Turvey	NextEV NIO	1:08.142	—N/a	6
7	11	(Brazil) Lucas di Grassi	Audi Sport ABT	1:08.223	—N/a	7
8	66	(Germany) Daniel Abt	Audi Sport ABT	1:08.348	—N/a	8
9	20	(New Zealand) Mitch Evans	Jaguar	1:08.356	—N/a	9
10	8	(France) Nico Prost	e.Dams-Renault	1:08.465	—N/a	10
11	6	(France) Loïc Duval	Dragon-Penske	1:08.483	—N/a	11
12	7	(Belgium) Jérôme d'Ambrosio	Dragon-Penske	1:08.552	—N/a	12
13	5	(Germany) Maro Engel	Venturi	1:08.582	—N/a	13
14	27	(Netherlands) Robin Frijns	Andretti-BMW	1:08.583	—N/a	14
15	4	(France) Tom Dillmann	Venturi	1:08.738	—N/a	15
16	33	(France) Stéphane Sarrazin	Techeetah-Renault	1:08.822	—N/a	16
17	28	(Portugal) António Félix da Costa	Andretti-BMW	1:09:085	—N/a	17
18	3	(Brazil) Nelson Piquet Jr.	NextEV NIO	1:09.149	—N/a	18
19	47	(United Kingdom) Adam Carroll	Jaguar	1:09.543	—N/a	19
20	23	(Germany) Nick Heidfeld	Mahindra	1:11.267	—N/a	20

=== Race two ===
Drivers who scored championship points are denoted in bold.

Final second race classification
Pos.	No.	Driver	Team	Laps	Time/Retired	Grid	Points
1	**9**	**(Switzerland) Sébastien Buemi**	**e.Dams-Renault**	**46**	**56:02.155**	**2**	25
2	**19**	**(Sweden) Felix Rosenqvist**	**Mahindra**	**46**	**+7.195**	**1**	18+3^{5} ^{6}
3	**11**	**(Brazil) Lucas di Grassi**	**Audi Sport ABT**	**46**	**+10.862**	**7**	15
4	**66**	**(Germany) Daniel Abt**	**Audi Sport ABT**	**46**	**+13.631**	**8**	12
5	**37**	**(Argentina) José María López**	**Virgin-Citroën**	**46**	**+20.324**	**3**	10
6	**25**	**(France) Jean-Éric Vergne**	**Techeetah-Renault**	**46**	**+20.751**	**5**	8
7	**2**	**(United Kingdom) Sam Bird**	**Virgin-Citroën**	**46**	**+21.959**	**4**	6
8	**8**	**(France) Nico Prost**	**e.Dams-Renault**	**46**	**+22.155**	**10**	4
9	**88**	**(United Kingdom) Oliver Turvey**	**NextEV NIO**	**46**	**+34.949**	**6**	2
10	**23**	**(Germany) Nick Heidfeld**	**Mahindra**	**46**	**+35.814**	**20**	1
11	28	(Portugal) António Félix da Costa	Andretti-BMW	46	+44.057	17	
12	3	(Brazil) Nelson Piquet Jr.	NextEV NIO	46	+44.439	18	
13	7	(Belgium) Jérôme d'Ambrosio	Dragon-Penske	46	+47.336	12	
14	33	(France) Stéphane Sarrazin	Techeetah-Renault	46	+51.653	16	
15	4	(France) Tom Dillmann	Venturi	46	+56.977	15	
16	47	(United Kingdom) Adam Carroll	Jaguar	46	+65.426	19	
17	20	(New Zealand) Mitch Evans	Jaguar	46	+67.018	9	
18	27	(Netherlands) Robin Frijns	Andretti-BMW	46	+72.083	14	
Ret	6	(France) Loïc Duval	Dragon-Penske	33	Did not finish	11	
Ret	**5**	**(Germany) Maro Engel**	**Venturi**	**14**	**Did not finish**	**13**	1^{7}

Notes:

- **^5** — Felix Rosenqvist had ten seconds added to his race time for an unsafe pit stop release.
- **^6** — Three points for pole position.
- **^7** — One point for fastest lap.

== Notes and references ==
=== References ===
Previous race: 2017 Paris ePrix	FIA Formula E Championship; 2016–17 season	Next race: 2017 New York City ePrix
Previous race: 2016 Berlin ePrix	Berlin ePrix	Next race: 2018 Berlin ePrix
