= 2018 Berlin ePrix =

Formula E electric car race held in Berlin in 2018

Race 9 of 12 of the 2017–18 Formula E Championship
← Previous race	Next race →
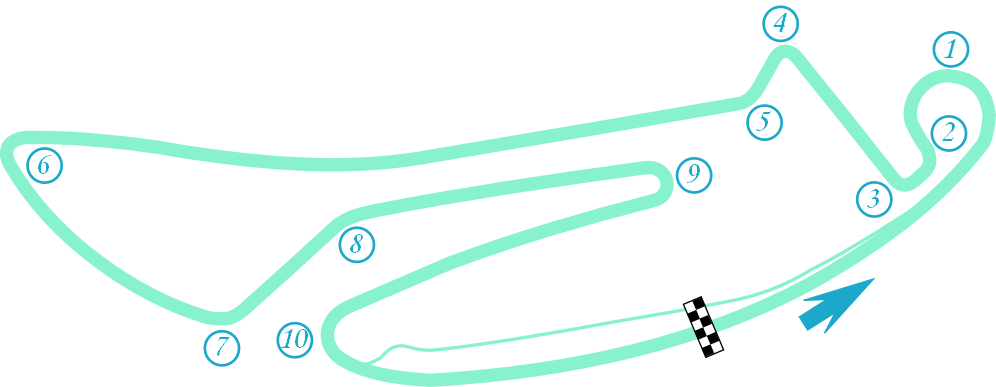

Race details
- Date: 19 May 2018
- Official name: 2018 BMW i Berlin E-Prix
- Location: Tempelhof Airport Street Circuit, Berlin
- Course: Street circuit
- Course length: 2.250 km (1.398 mi)
- Distance: 45 laps, 101.250 km (62.914 mi)
- Weather: Warm and sunny

Pole position
Driver	(Germany) Daniel Abt	Audi
- Time: 1:09.472

Fastest lap
Driver	(Germany) Daniel Abt	Audi
- Time: 1:12.409 on lap 26

Podium
First	(Germany) Daniel Abt	Audi
Second	(Brazil) Lucas di Grassi	Audi
Third	(France) Jean-Éric Vergne	Techeetah-Renault

The 2018 Berlin ePrix (formally the 2018 BMW i Berlin E-Prix) was a Formula E electric car race held at the Tempelhof Airport Street Circuit at Tempelhof Airport in the outskirts of Berlin on 19 May 2018. It was the ninth round of the 2017–18 Formula E Championship and the fourth edition of the event as part of the championship. The 45-lap race was won by Audi driver Daniel Abt after starting from the pole position. Defending champion Lucas di Grassi finished second in the other Audi, thus recording the second one-two finish in Formula E history. Jean-Éric Vergne, the championship leader going into Berlin, took third for Techeetah.

Daniel Abt won the pole position by recording the fastest lap in qualifying and he maintained his start line advantage for virtually the entire race, with teammate di Grassi in second at Audi's home ePrix despite Abt having a slow mandatory mid-event pit stop to switch into a second car as he had to let e.Dams-Renault's Sébastien Buemi enter his pitbox. Abt also set the fastest lap of the race, meaning he left Berlin with the full complement of 29 points from a single ePrix, and he achieved the first Grand Chelem in the history of Formula E.

The consequence of the final positions increased Vergne's Drivers' Championship lead to 40 points over Virgin's Sam Bird, who came seventh. In the Teams' Championship, Audi scored a maximum 47 points because of their one-two finish and with Abt scoring pole and fastest lap. They advanced to second in the points standings behind the dominant Techeetah squad, with 45 points separating the two teams with three races left in the season.

== Background ==
The 2018 Berlin ePrix was confirmed as part of Formula E's 2017–18 series schedule in September 2017 by the FIA World Motor Sport Council. It was the ninth of twelve scheduled single-seater electric car races of the 2017–18 Championship, and the fourth Berlin ePrix. The ePrix was held at the 2.375 km (1.476 mi) clockwise ten-turn Tempelhof Airport Street Circuit at Berlin Tempelhof Airport on 19 May 2018. The track was described as "very technical" and it was anticipated by the press that most of the overtaking manoeuvres during the race would occur at the braking areas for turns one, six and the turn nine hairpin. Three changes were made to the Tempelhof circuit from the year before: the first involved the re-positioning pit lane entry from turn ten to after the final corner. The second was that the 180 degree turn six right-hander was moved away from the center of a braking zone slightly to allow for a straighter approach to the turn nine hairpin and to provide more overtaking opportunities. The last change saw the length of the straight increase by 40 m (130 ft). These alterations increased the track's overall length by 100 m (330 ft).

Entering the race, Techeetah driver Jean-Éric Vergne was leading the Drivers' Championship with 147 points. His nearest rival Sam Bird of Virgin was thirty-one points behind in second place and third-placed Felix Rosenqvist for Mahindra was another thirty points adrift. e.Dams-Renault's Sébastien Buemi was fourth with 70 points and Lucas di Grassi of Audi completed the top five with 58 points. In the Teams' Championship, Techeetah led the standings with 186 points accrued throughout the season; Virgin were 42 points behind in second and Audi were a further 21 points in arrears in third place. Mahindra placed fourth with 107 points and Jaguar stood in fifth position with 88 points.

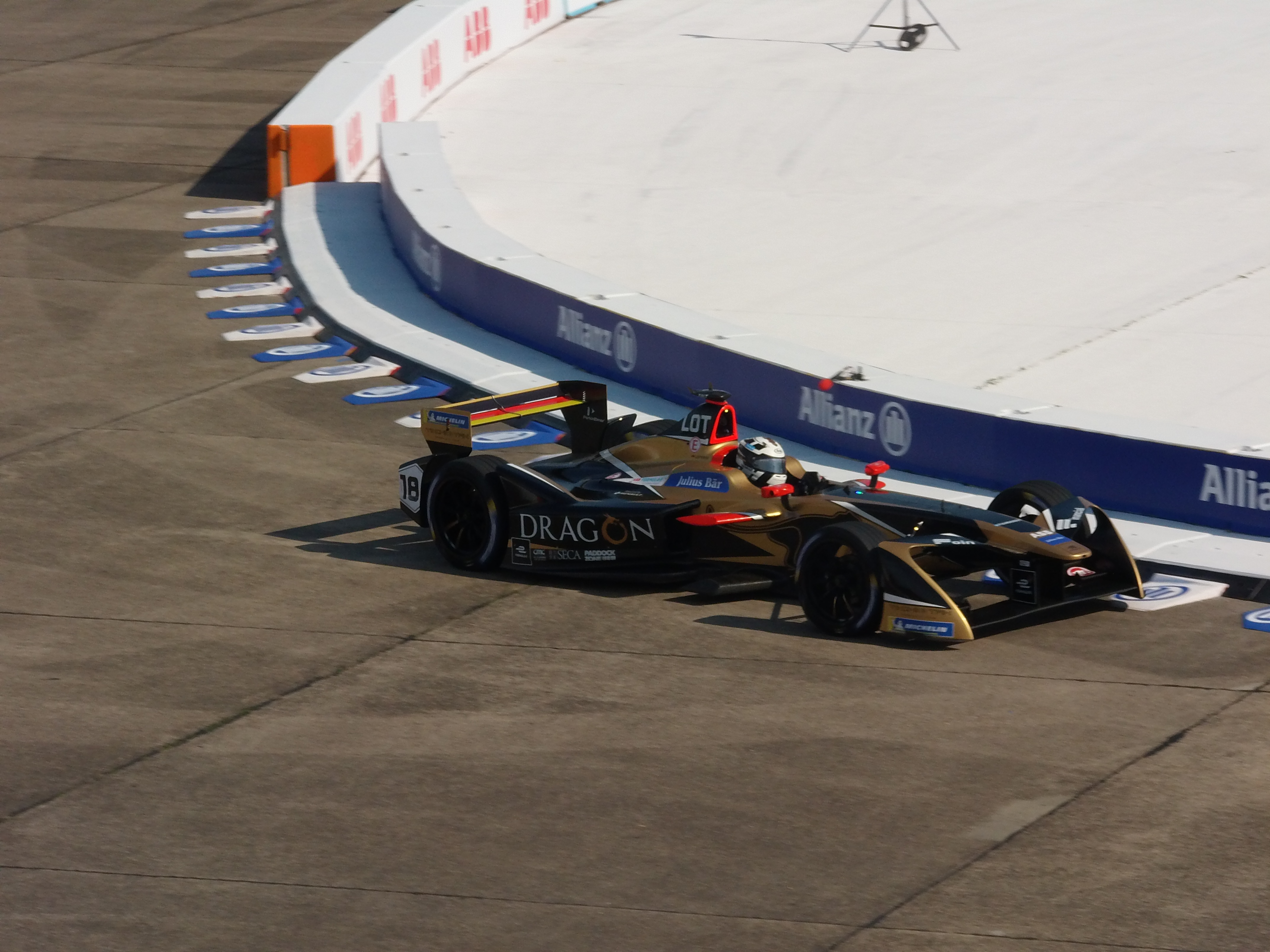
André Lotterer declared before the race that he would aid his Techeetah teammate Jean-Éric Vergne in his battle for the championship.

After winning the Paris ePrix three weeks ago, Vergne focused on trying to finish ahead of Bird in the battle for the Drivers' Championship in the closing four races of the season but entered the Berlin race with a poor record from the previous year and Techeetah had limited testing opportunities because of its status as a customer team, "At this stage in the season, it's all about keeping it clean and scoring points." Vergne received support from his teammate André Lotterer, one of four German drivers competing in Berlin, who declared he would help Vergne win the championship and pledged not to crash into anybody, "If I can help, I'll help. JEV has been a great team-mate to help me get up to speed anyhow – we play this card for the team [and] everything in a reasonable [way]." Daniel Abt of Audi meanwhile came second in the 2016 race and was confident about his chances, "A victory in Berlin would be the highlight of my Formula E career. I had a second place in the penultimate season and even that was very emotional for me."

A total of 20 drivers representing ten teams of two participants each raced in the event. There were three driver changes entering the race. Having been in one of the Venturi cars since the season-opening Hong Kong race, Edoardo Mortara was replaced by the team's reserve and test driver Tom Dillmann, who had previously competed in the final seven races of the previous season. The change was necessitated because Mortara was mandated to prioritise the Deutsche Tourenwagen Masters (DTM) round at the Lausitzring over the Berlin Formula E race by Mercedes-Benz per the requirements of his DTM contract. Tom Blomqvist was released from his contract by Andretti after his poor performance in comparison to teammate António Félix da Costa since he debuted in Marrakesh and was set to focus on BMW's GT programme. Blomqvist was replaced by series veteran and SMP Racing driver Stéphane Sarrazin for the rest of the season. After being stood down for NIO reserve driver Ma Qinghua in Paris to exercise a contractual arrangement and for promotional reasons, Luca Filippi returned to partner Oliver Turvey at the team.

== Practice ==
Two practice sessions—both on Saturday morning—were held before the late afternoon race. The first session ran for 45 minutes and the second lasted half an hour. A half an hour untimed shakedown session was held on Friday afternoon to enable teams to check the reliability of their cars and their electronic systems. A post-shakedown fine of €1000 was issued to Filippi because he was observed speeding in the pit lane. Nick Heidfeld (Mahindra) was fastest in the first practice session with a 200 kW (270 hp) lap of one minute and 9.667 seconds at the close of the session. His closest challenger was Buemi who was 0.474 seconds off Heidfeld's pace in second with Vergne in third and Rosenqvist fourth. Turvey, Alex Lynn (Virgin), Félix da Costa, di Grassi, Mitch Evans (Jaguar), Nico Prost (e.Dams-Renault) and Abt placed fifth through tenth. Sarrazin caused the session to be stopped for fifteen minutes when he understeered straight into the turn one barrier due to his throttle being partially engaged under braking. This necessitated officials to extract his damaged car from the track via a crane and one of the TecPro barriers needed repairing. Competitors lost valuable practice time and the session restarted with fifteen minutes remaining. Drivers familiarised themselves with their car-setups in second practice and got into a rhythm during their 200 kW (270 hp) laps despite encountering slower traffic and discarded tyre rubber at the side of the circuit was problematic for all. Vergne set the fastest lap of the weekend so far with a time of one minute and 9.438 seconds despite narrowly avoiding grazing the turn seven wall. Rosenqvist was second and Lotterer was the fastest of the German drivers in third. Di Grassi and Abt were fourth and sixth and the Audis were separated by Buemi in fifth. Jérôme d'Ambrosio (Dragon) was seventh-quickest, Lynn eighth, Evans ninth and Bird completed the top ten ahead of qualifying.

== Qualifying ==
Saturday's afternoon qualifying session ran for an hour and was divided into four groups of five cars. Each group was determined by a lottery system and was permitted six minutes of on-track activity. All drivers were limited to two timed laps with one at maximum power. The fastest five overall competitors in the four groups participated in a "Super Pole" session with one driver on the track at any time going out in reverse order from fifth to first. Each of the five drivers was limited to one timed lap and the starting order was determined by the competitor's fastest times (Super Pole from first to fifth, and group qualifying from sixth to twentieth). The driver and team who recorded the fastest time were awarded three points towards their respective championships.

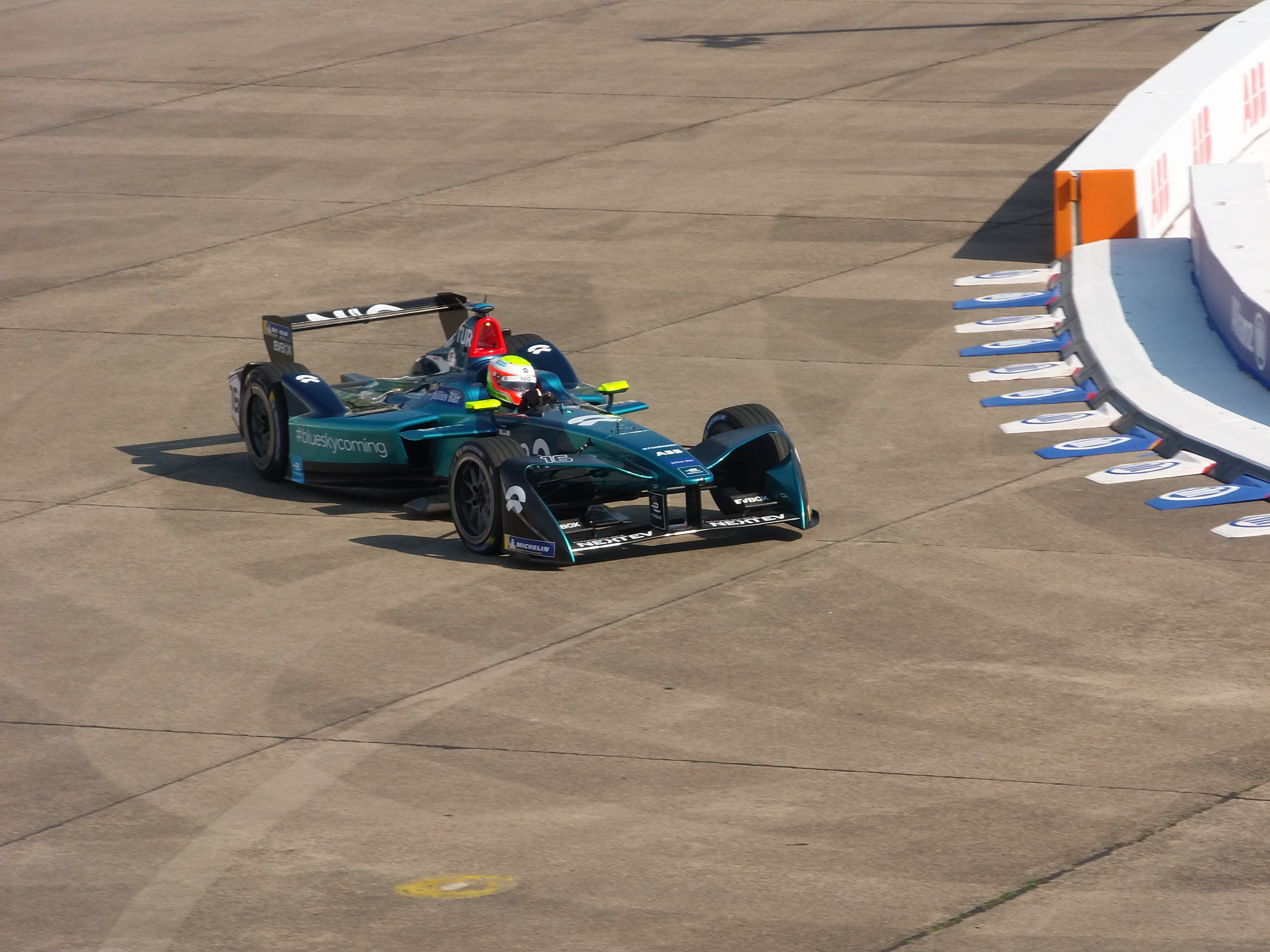
Oliver Turvey qualified on the front row of the grid in second place.

Traditionally the first qualifying group would have competitors struggle to reach super pole but the Templehof Airport Street Circuit has been known to produce unexpected results since its concrete surface absorbs heat generated by a car's tyres and this posed a risk those who had little to no grip in their vehicles. Abt paced the first group, followed by Turvey and the Jaguar duo of Evans (who made a driving error) and Nelson Piquet Jr. Super pole favourite Lotterer was one of the first drivers to venture onto the circuit and attempt a maximum power lap. He slid luridly through the sixth turn, and then glanced the outside barrier leaving the high-speed turn seven left-hander on his timed lap, sustaining possible car damage given he was eight-tenths of a second slower than Abt. In the second group, Lynn set the fastest first sector time of anyone at the time to go third overall and was fastest despite losing time through car correction in the second sector. José María López (Dragon) eliminated Piquet and Lotterer from super pole with the second quickest group time. Maro Engel (Venturi) placed third and Heidfeld managed fourth after glancing the wall. Félix da Costa locked his brakes and was slowest in the second group. D'Ambrosio set the fastest group three lap to go second overall, which was deemed "a major improvement" considering his poor performance earlier in the season. Dillmann was second-quickest, Sarrazin out-qualified teammate Félix da Costa on his Formula E return in third, and Filippi took fourth. Prost had an untidy exit coming out of turn five and was the slowest overall driver in group qualifying.

Di Grassi was fastest overall in the fourth group with a 1-minute and 9.620 seconds lap, which was one-tenth of a second slower than Engel's 2017 fastest race lap despite the track's increased length. Vergne was one-tenth of a second slower than di Grassi in second and Rosenqvist could not reach super pole with a lap that was one hundredths of a second outside the limit and it placed him third in the group. Buemi was the first driver to record a lap time in the group and briefly moved into the top five before di Grassi and Vergne demoted him. Bird was the fourth group's slowest competitor. At the end of group qualifying, di Grassi, Vergne, Turvey, d'Ambrosio and Abt's lap times advanced them to super pole. Abt was fastest in all three sectors by making no errors and secured his and Audi's first pole position of his season and the second of his career since the 2015 Long Beach ePrix with a time of one minute and 9.472 seconds. He was joined on the grid's front row by Turvey (the first to drive onto the track) who recorded a lap 0.263 seconds slower and had the pole until Abt's lap despite locking his brakes on the approach to turn six. Vergne could not match Abt's pace as he went close to hitting the wall exiting the turn nine hairpin and took third. D'Ambrosio picked up some oversteer going through the first corner and slowed for fourth. Fifth-placed di Grassi ran close to the turn three exit barrier and carried too much speed entering the turn nine hairpin, understeered, and corrected a slide which lost him eight-tenths of a second.

=== Post-qualifying ===
Abt was investigated by the stewards for a potential infraction of Article 33.3 of Formula E's sporting regulations because data received by the technical delegate of Formula E from his car was in the 200 kW (270 hp) mode approximately 350 m (1,150 ft) before the beginning of the circuit's final sector. Though Audi and Abt could not explain why the infraction occurred, he was reprimanded not penalised as the stewards deemed he had gained no performance advantage. Lotterer was demoted ten places on the grid because he was adjudged to have caused a crash with Bird on the final lap of the Paris ePrix. However, he could not take the full penalty because he began from 20th after setting the 18th quickest lap time and had to serve a mandatory ten-second time penalty at his pit stop to switch into a second car. After Lotterer's penalty, the rest of the grid lined up as Rosenqvist, Buemi, Lynn, Evans, Bird, López, Dillmann, Engel, Heidfeld, Piquet, Sarrazin, Félix da Costa, Filippi, Prost and Lotterer.

=== Qualifying classification ===
Final qualifying classification
Pos.	No.	Driver	Team	GS	SP	Grid
1	66	(Germany) Daniel Abt	Audi	1:09.774	1:09.472	1
2	16	(United Kingdom) Oliver Turvey	NIO	1:09.943	1:09.735	2
3	25	(France) Jean-Éric Vergne	Techeetah-Renault	1:09.765	1:09.991	3
4	7	(Belgium) Jérôme d'Ambrosio	Dragon-Penske	1:09.938	1:10.054	4
5	1	(Brazil) Lucas di Grassi	Audi	1:09.620	1:10.498	5
6	19	(Sweden) Felix Rosenqvist	Mahindra	1:09.951	—N/a	6
7	9	(Switzerland) Sébastien Buemi	e.dams-Renault	1:09.994	—N/a	7
8	36	(United Kingdom) Alex Lynn	Virgin-Citroën	1:10.002	—N/a	8
9	20	(New Zealand) Mitch Evans	Jaguar	1:10.087	—N/a	9
10	2	(United Kingdom) Sam Bird	Virgin-Citroën	1:10.087	—N/a	10
11	6	(Argentina) José María López	Dragon-Penske	1:10.105	—N/a	11
12	4	(France) Tom Dillmann	Venturi	1:10.214	—N/a	12
13	5	(Germany) Maro Engel	Venturi	1:10.248	—N/a	13
14	23	(Germany) Nick Heidfeld	Mahindra	1:10.264	—N/a	14
15	3	(Brazil) Nelson Piquet Jr.	Jaguar	1:10.270	—N/a	15
16	27	(France) Stéphane Sarrazin	Andretti-BMW	1:10.315	—N/a	16
17	28	(Portugal) António Félix da Costa	Andretti-BMW	1:10.417	—N/a	17
18	18	(Germany) André Lotterer	Techeetah-Renault	1:10.598	—N/a	20^{1}
19	68	(Italy) Luca Filippi	NIO	1:10.601	—N/a	18
20	8	(France) Nico Prost	e.dams-Renault	1:10.618	—N/a	19

Notes:

- ^1— André Lotterer was demoted ten places on the grid because was deemed to have an accident at the preceding Paris ePrix.

== Race ==
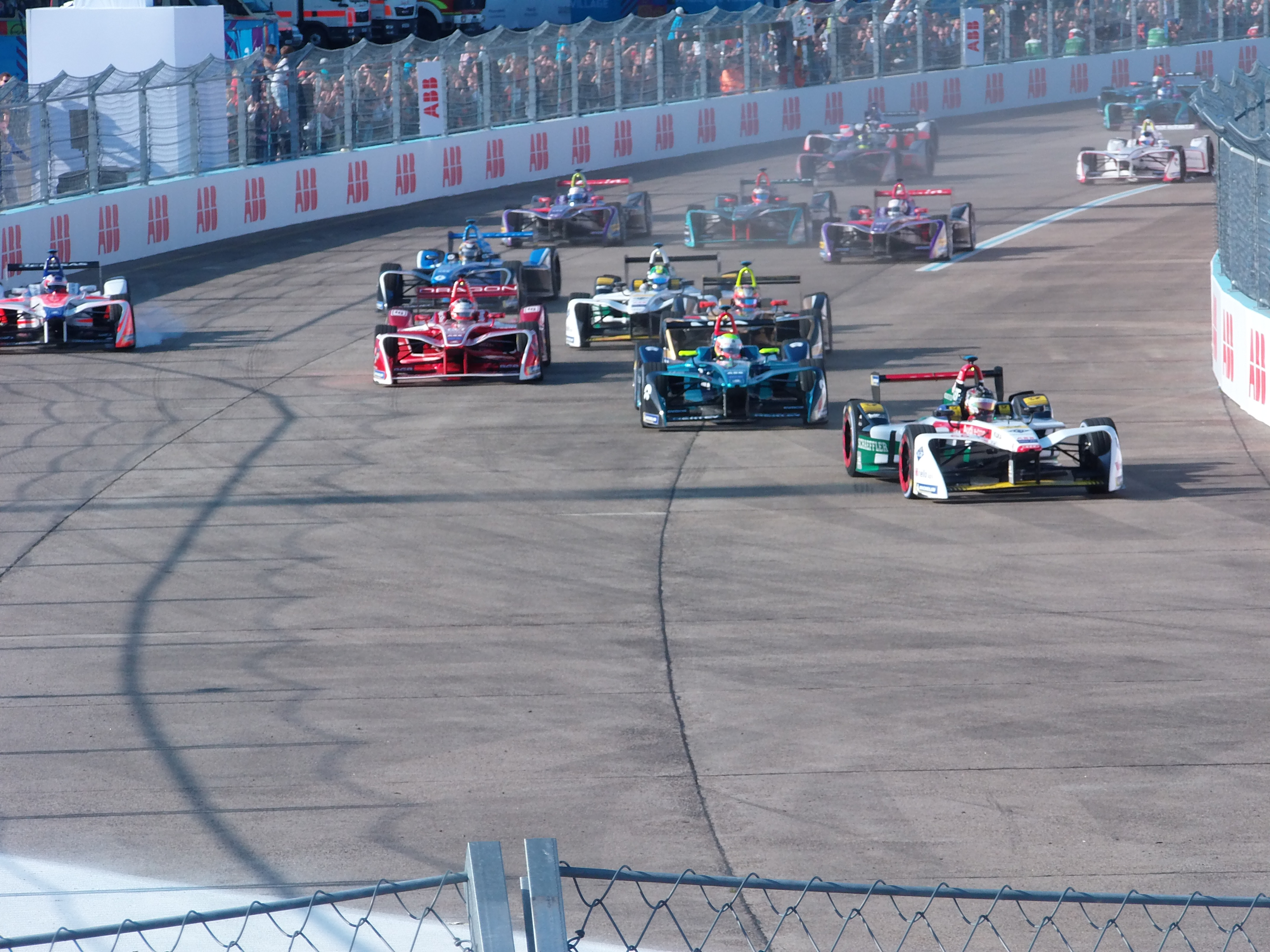
The start of the race which had all twenty entrants finish.

Weather conditions at the start of the race were dry and sunny. The air temperature throughout the race was between 21.45 and 22.05 °C (70.61 and 71.69 °F) and the track temperature ranged from 20.55 to 21.10 °C (68.99 to 69.98 °F). A special feature of Formula E is the "Fan Boost" feature, an additional 100 kilowatts (130 hp) of power to use in the driver's second car. The three drivers who were allowed to use the boost were determined by a fan vote. Abt, Rosenqvist and Buemi were awarded the extra power for the Berlin race. The ePrix's start time was moved from 16:03 Central European Summer Time (UTC+02:00) to 18:03 by German national broadcaster ARD to enable a live telecast between the women's DFB-Pokal and the men's DFB-Pokal finals. On the grid, Abt held his lead approaching the first corner, while Turvey aggressively held off an attack by Vergne. D'Ambrosio then executed a late manoeuvre around the outside of Vergne for third at the first turn having moved past di Grassi shortly beforehand. Behind them, Rosenqvist tried to copy this move but ran wide onto the dusty turn one run-off area. He kept his car out of the barriers but fell out of the top ten. At the end of the first lap, Abt led Turvey by seven-tenths of a second with d'Ambrosio nearly a further second behind in third.

D'Ambrosio fended off Vergne and di Grassi until Vergne moved ahead of him on the inside line at turn six on the second lap with di Grassi getting past d'Ambrosio entering the turn nine hairpin the lap after. Buemi then demoted d'Ambrosio to sixth with an overtake at the turn nine hairpin on lap four. Further down the order, Heidfeld passed Piquet around the outside at the first corner on the fifth lap while Rosenqvist waited until the following lap to get by the latter. Meanwhile, Evans overtook Bird to claim seventh into turn six. Bird considered challenging him around the outside before slowing. On lap seven, Heidfeld dived down the inside of López driving into the first turn to take over twelfth. Upfront, Abt established a healthy advantage over Turvey who held off Vergne and di Grassi. The ninth lap had Heidfeld overtake Dillmann approaching the turn nine hairpin to move into the top ten while Lynn fell behind Piquet, Rosenqvist, Sarrazin and Félix da Costa because an electrical glitch affected his power usage. Then on lap 11, di Grassi passed Vergne around the outside of turn six to move into third. This disrupted Vergne's momentum enough to enable Buemi to demote him to fifth around the inside of the turn nine hairpin on that lap.

Starting lap 12, Di Grassi attacked the electrical energy saving Turvey entering turn one but his manoeuvre was unsuccessful. That did not prevent di Grassi from attempting again and was successful next time round; getting past Turvey to claim second around the inside on the straight heading into turn six. Elsewhere, Heidfeld's move up the field temporarily stopped as he was delayed by Engel and defended from López. Similarly, d'Ambrosio lost positions to Evans and Bird while Lotterer was now in fifteenth position by lap 15. Abt's lead had stabilised to three and a half seconds over teammate di Grassi by lap 20. That lap, Vergne lunged at Buemi on the run to the first corner as both drivers went wide and minor contact was made when Vergne took fourth from Buemi at the next turn. The first pit stops for the switch into a second car was made by Turvey at the end of lap 22 with the rest of the field following on the next lap with no incidents occurring in contrast to previous rounds of the season. After the pit stops, Abt retained his lead over teammate di Grassi but it was lowered to six-tenths of a second because he waited for Buemi to pass by but it prevented him from having an unsafe release. Buemi meanwhile got back past Vergne due to a faster pit stop.

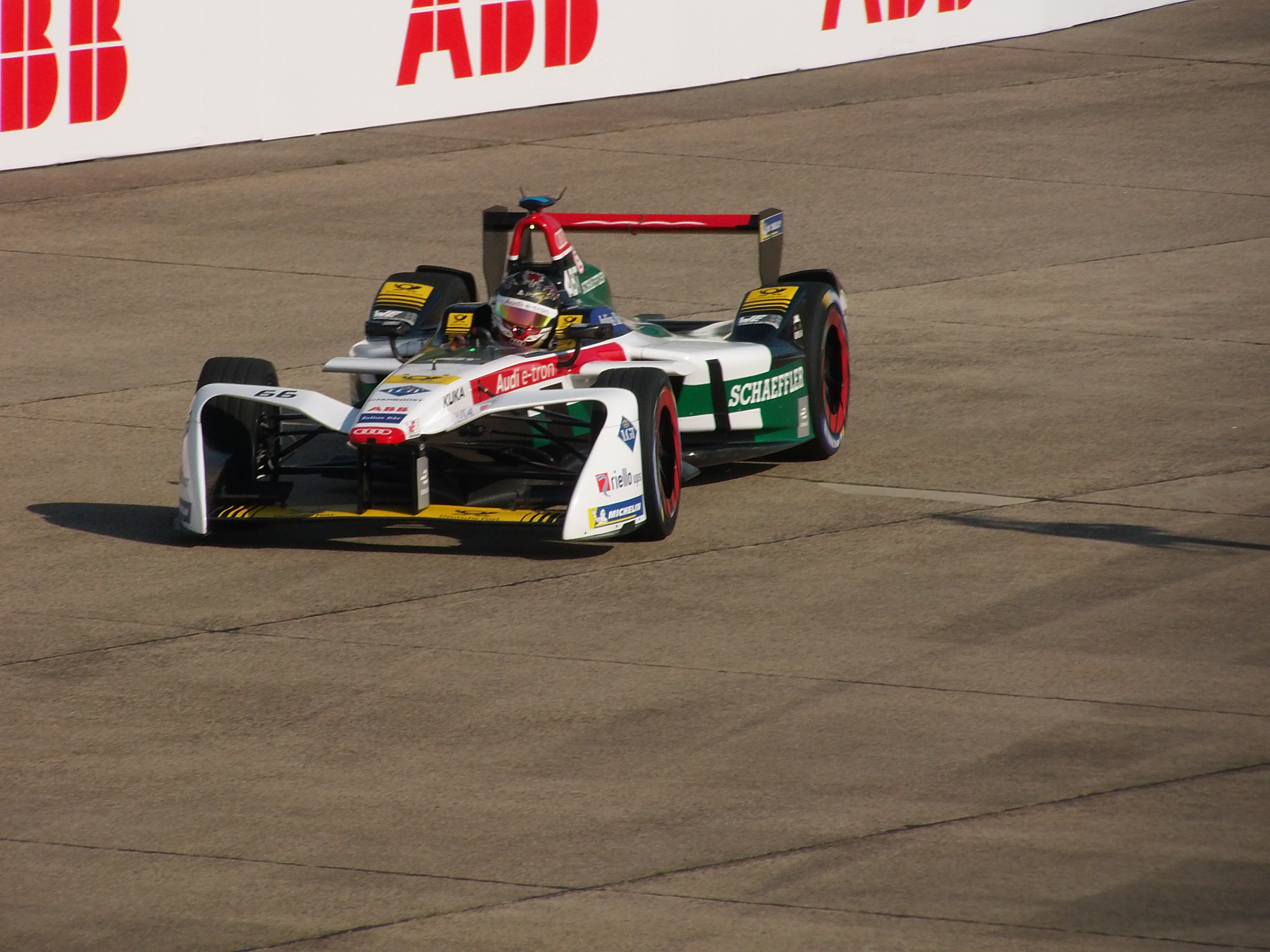
Daniel Abt claimed the first Grand Slam in the history of Formula E by earning pole position in qualifying, setting the race's fastest lap and leading every lap to claim his second career victory.

Abt soon began increasing his lead over teammate di Grassi who reportedly carried a steering problem. He earned one point for setting the race's fastest lap at lap 26, a 1-minute and 12,409 seconds lap. Audi also instructed their drivers via pit boards not to take any risks. Attention then focused on d'Ambrosio who delayed the quartet of López, Heidfeld, Engel and Rosenqvist. Heidfeld was so distracted on attempting to pass López, that it allowed Engel to overtake him for ninth at the first turn. Upfront, Buemi and Vergne got close enough to challenge Turvey who had electrical energy management problems. Buemi passed Turvey when the latter ran wide at turn ten on lap 33 and Vergne saw an opportunity to get past Turvey leaving the same corner. Vergne later found himself in a position to overtake Buemi entering turn one upon starting the next lap but decided against doing so. He instead waited until turn six when he decided late on to steer to the left and pass a surprised Buemi for third as he was intent on maintaining his championship lead. Buemi tried to cutback on Vergne leaving the corner but nudged his nose cone into Vergne's rear wing.

Elsewhere, D'Ambrosio fell behind López. He fell further back when Dillmann passed him before turn one. Heidfeld moved past d'Ambrosio approaching turn two and Rosenqvist overtook the latter heading towards turn six. Engel and López fought amongst themselves but got close to Bird and formed a close queue of cars from seventh to thirteenth. Piquet moved ahead of Rosenqvist around the outside entering turn ten to claim twelfth. Rosenqvist used his FanBoost the lap after on the straight entering turn six to try and retake twelfth from Piquet but the latter fended off his manoeuvre. Piquet carried enough momentum to pass Heidfeld and Dillmann to move into the top ten. Piquet tried to pass López on the inside line heading into the final corner but was unsuccessful. Piquet then tried again on the same line into the first corner but locked his front brakes; he and López ran wide into the turn's dusty run-off area. Both Mahindras moved past and López was tapped from behind by Rosenqvist on the apex of turn three and spun. These events allowed Lotterer to get into the top ten.

Vergne tried to set the fastest lap in the final laps but could not do so. Lotterer had conserved enough electrical energy and used it to overtake Heidfeld for ninth on the final lap. Meanwhile, Abt found a rhythm he liked and extended his advantage at the front of the field to 6.7 seconds to cross the start/finish line after 45 laps to claim his second career victory after his Mexico City ePrix win two months prior. Abt achieved the first "Grand Slam" in Formula E history (pole position, fastest lap, led every lap and the win). Di Grassi followed 6.758 seconds later in second and Audi secured the second one-two finish in Formula E history after Techeetah achieved the feat in the Santiago ePrix. Vergne completed the podium in third. Off the podium, Buemi took fourth, Turvey claimed fifth, Evans finished sixth, Bird placed seventh, Engel was eighth and Lotterer came ninth. Heidfeld completed the top ten and earned his first point since the Marrakesh ePrix. The last of the finishers were Rosenqvist, Piquet, Dillmann, Prost, Félix da Costa, Lynn, Filippi, López, d'Ambrosio and Sarrazin. This race had all twenty starters finish for the first time in the season.

=== Post-race ===
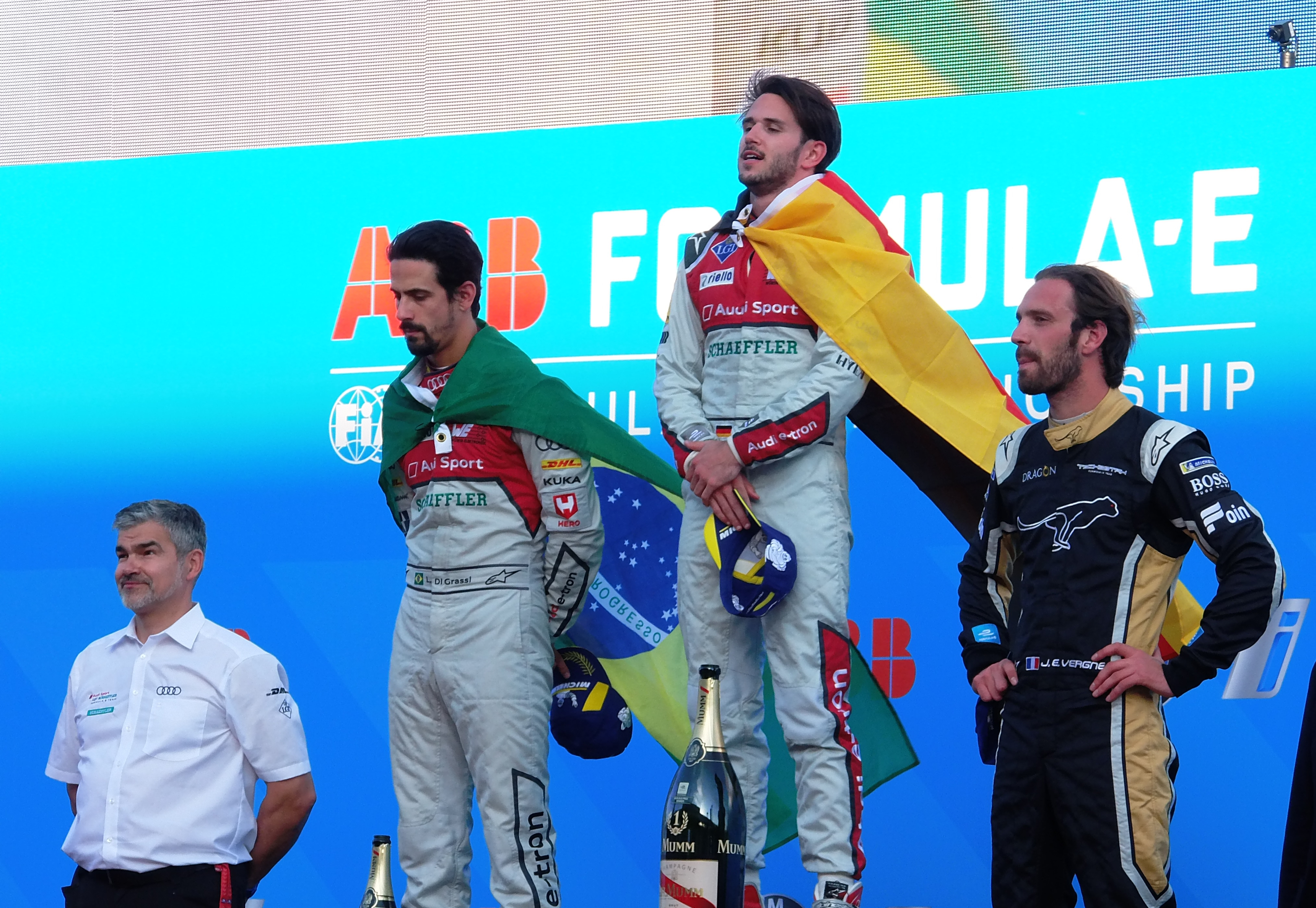
The top three finishers and Audi head of motorsport Dieter Gass standing on the podium after the race.

The top three drivers appeared on the podium to collect their trophies and spoke to the media in a later press conference. Abt spoke of his delight over taking the victory the one-two finish and stated he was feeling confident on the day, "It's super special. I keep saying I have these weeks where I just feel like good stuff is going to happen and I had this feeling here in my home round." Di Grassi took his fourth successive second-place finish and congratulated his teammate Abt on taking the win. He stated his feeling that it was a deserved victory for Abt, "The one-two is a dream come true for Audi after we started the year so badly and now we've recovered and are second in the team championship, and it was my fourth straight podium in a row – I can only be happy!" Third-placed Vergne joined in the congratulations to Abt and Audi for their achievements and said he was happy with the job his team undertook after their poor performance at Templehof the previous year, "The race went very well, I took it easy, I knew from this morning the Audi guys were out of reach. When Lucas was behind I didn't even look, I let him by. Then I passed Buemi and he was quite aggressive in closing the door sometimes. The pit stop wasn't bad, I lost a position to Buemi so I had to pass him again."

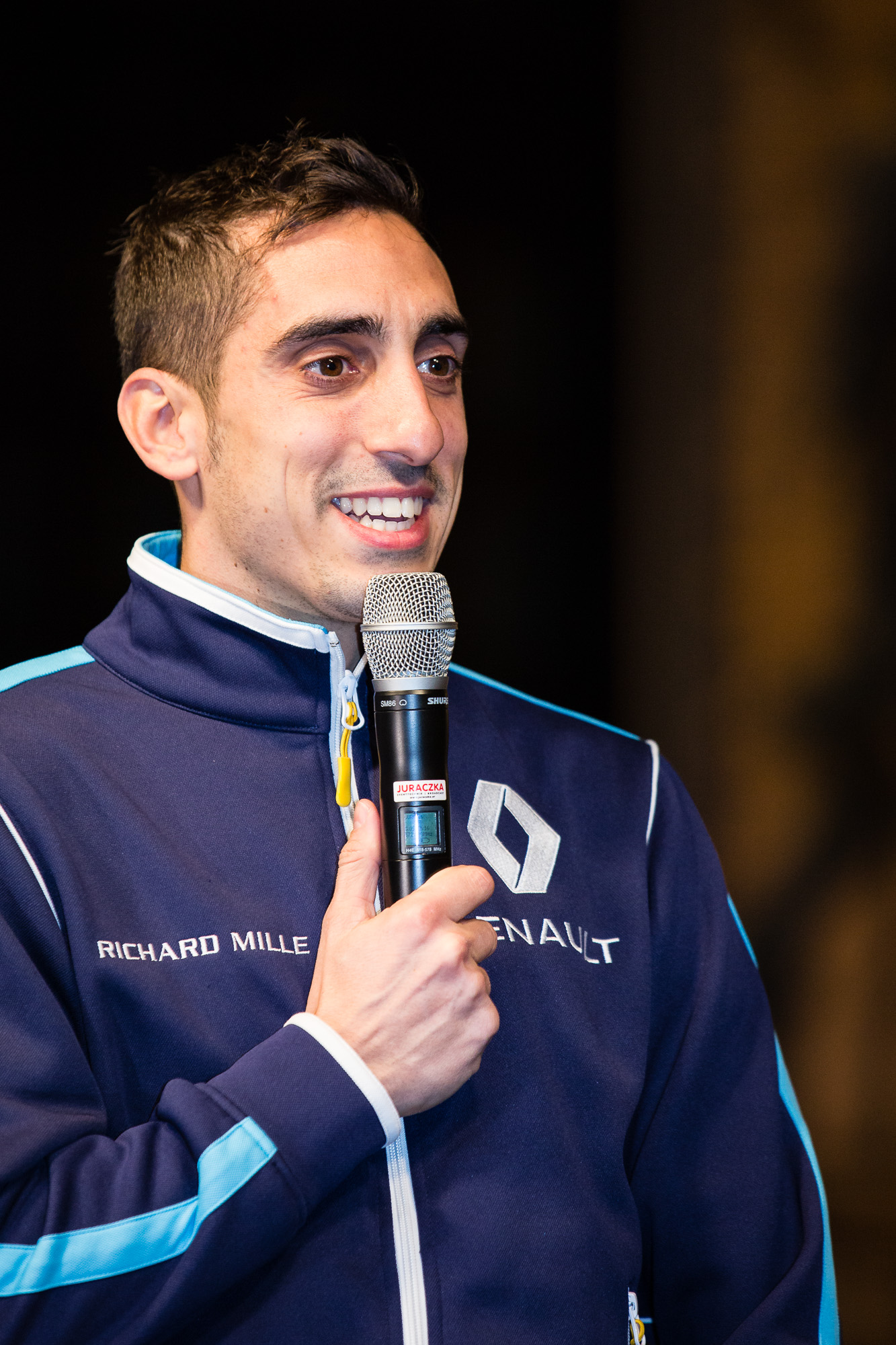
Sébastien Buemi (pictured in 2016) warned championship leader Jean-Éric Vergne to expect an alternative response in future battles between the two.

Turvey was convinced that the strategy his team made was the correct one, saying the decision to make a pit stop one lap earlier than everyone else was because of him saving too much electrical energy but believed a podium would have been difficult to maintain due to Buemi and Vergne's fast pace, "When we changed strategy, I felt I could stay with the Audis but not be any quicker. They were super quick, both of them. When I saw them carry on and I pitted a lap earlier, that was it. They had a big advantage today in the race." Rosenqvist spoke of his belief that he had to risk his first lap overtaking manoeuvre so he could get back into championship contention and suspected his car's handling was the reason he struggled during the ePrix because he anticipated an eighth or ninth-place finish, "I don't think it's a powertrain matter, it's more [that] I don't feel the car underneath me and I think that's costing a lot of energy and a lot of lap time, [at] every corner. It's just been a different car compared to last year."

Sarrazin said that energy management hindered his race because he had used too much but sought to improve for the Zürich ePrix. Buemi warned Vergne to expect an alternative response if he decided to battle with him in the future but said he believed if he attempted the same action as Vergne he would have crashed, "He's been a bit tough I felt in some of the contacts but I was just a bit on the back foot because I was slower. I'm looking forward to the next time because next time I'll go a bit harder, I won't care as much so we'll see. He won the battle, but next time he should not expect it to be like that." Bird told the press that he was still hopeful that he could catch Vergne in the Drivers' Championship battle as he expected to improve his results in the season's closing three races but stated his feeling a repeat of his 2017 New York City ePrix double header success would be more difficult next time round, "Like normal, I have to do a miracle at the last race! But stranger things have happened. Looking back at New York last year, that wasn't so bad for me. 53 out of 58 points came my way. To do that again will take some doing though."

The consequence of the race meant Vergne increased his lead at the top of the Drivers' Championship to 40 points over his nearest rival Bird. Rosenqvist was a further 36 points adrift in third place and race winner Abt moved from sixth to fourth. Buemi's fourth-place finish meant he fell to fifth position. Techeetah maintained their lead in the Teams' Championship but their advantage had been reduced to 44 points by Audi whose one-two result moved them to second. Virgin's solitary points result from Bird meant the team fell to third and Mahindra and Jaguar kept fourth and fifth places respectively with three races left in the season. Ivan Yim the managing director for Techeetah, cautioned the team over their battle against Audi as he was aware of the German marque's strengths and urged his team to score as many points as possible.

=== Race classification ===
Drivers who scored championship points are denoted in bold.

Final race classification
Pos.	No.	Driver	Team	Laps	Time/Retired	Grid	Points
1	**66**	**(Germany) Daniel Abt**	**Audi**	**45**	**55:35.546**	**1**	25+3+1^{2}
2	**1**	**(Brazil) Lucas di Grassi**	**Audi**	**45**	**+6.758**	**5**	18
3	**25**	**(France) Jean-Éric Vergne**	**Techeetah-Renault**	**45**	**+12.894**	**3**	15
4	**9**	**(Switzerland) Sébastien Buemi**	**e.dams-Renault**	**45**	**+17.282**	**7**	12
5	**16**	**(United Kingdom) Oliver Turvey**	**NIO**	**45**	**+19.620**	**2**	10
6	**20**	**(New Zealand) Mitch Evans**	**Jaguar**	**45**	**+24.586**	**9**	8
7	**2**	**(United Kingdom) Sam Bird**	**Virgin-Citroën**	**45**	**+34.610**	**10**	6
8	**5**	**(Germany) Maro Engel**	**Venturi**	**45**	**+37.814**	**13**	4
9	**18**	**(Germany) André Lotterer**	**Techeetah-Renault**	**45**	**+44.359**	**20**	2
10	**23**	**(Germany) Nick Heidfeld**	**Mahindra**	**45**	**+45.931**	**14**	1
**11**	19	(Sweden) Felix Rosenqvist	Mahindra	45	+46.381	6	
**12**	3	(Brazil) Nelson Piquet Jr.	Jaguar	45	+49.087	15	
**13**	4	(France) Tom Dillmann	Venturi	45	+50.150	12	
**14**	8	(France) Nico Prost	e.dams-Renault	45	+50.381	19	
**15**	28	(Portugal) António Félix da Costa	Andretti-BMW	45	+52.715	17	
**16**	36	(United Kingdom) Alex Lynn	Virgin-Citroën	45	+53.000	8	
**17**	68	(Italy) Luca Filippi	NIO	45	+53.302	18	
**18**	6	(Argentina) José María López	Dragon-Penske	45	+53.611	11	
**19**	7	(Belgium) Jérôme d'Ambrosio	Dragon-Penske	45	+54.289	4	
**20**	27	(France) Stéphane Sarrazin	Andretti-BMW	45	+1:06.954	16	

Notes:

- **^2** — One point for fastest lap, three points for pole position.

== Standings after the race ==
Drivers' Championship standings

+/–	Pos	Driver	Points
	1	(France) Jean-Éric Vergne	162
	2	(United Kingdom) Sam Bird	122 (−40)
	3	(Sweden) Felix Rosenqvist	86 (−76)
2	4	(Germany) Daniel Abt	85 (−77)
1	5	(Switzerland) Sébastien Buemi	82 (−80)

Teams' Championship standings

+/–	Pos	Constructor	Points
	1	(China) Techeetah-Renault	205
1	2	(Germany) Audi	161 (−44)
1	3	(United Kingdom) Virgin-Citroën	139 (−66)
	4	(India) Mahindra	108 (−97)
	5	(United Kingdom) Jaguar	96 (−109)

- Notes: Only the top five positions are included for both sets of standings.

Previous race: 2018 Paris ePrix	FIA Formula E Championship; 2017–18 season	Next race: 2018 Zürich ePrix
Previous race: 2017 Berlin ePrix	Berlin ePrix	Next race: 2019 Berlin ePrix
