= Berlin ePrix =

Electric auto race in the Formula E series

- Tempelhof Airport Street Circuit (2024–present)
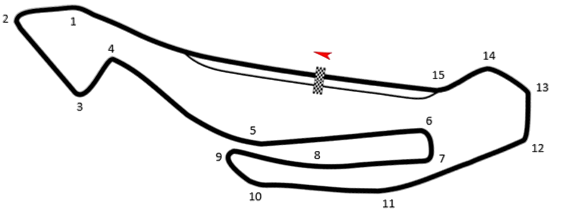

Race information
- Number of times held: 12
- First held: 2015
- Most wins (drivers): (Portugal) António Félix da Costa (New Zealand) Nick Cassidy (New Zealand) Mitch Evans (all 3)
- Most wins (constructors): (United Kingdom) Jaguar (5)
- Circuit length: 2.343 km (1.460 miles)
- Race length: 101.250 km (62.914 miles)

Last race (2026 Race 2)

Pole position
- (Germany) Pascal Wehrlein; Porsche; 57.292

Podium
- 1. (New Zealand) Mitch Evans; Jaguar; 39:50.663; 2. (United Kingdom) Oliver Rowland; Nissan; +0.822; 3. (Germany) Pascal Wehrlein; Porsche; +1.111

Fastest lap
- (United Kingdom) Oliver Rowland; Nissan; 59.131

The Berlin ePrix is an annual race of the single-seater, electrically powered Formula E championship, held in Berlin, Germany. It was first raced in the 2014–15 season.

== Circuits ==
=== Tempelhof Airport ===
The 2015 Berlin ePrix took place at a temporary circuit at Tempelhof Airport, that was 2.469 km long with 17 turns. But because Tempelhof Airport was used for housing refugees in 2016, the second edition could not take place there. The race returned to Tempelhof Airport in 2017 with an updated layout that features 10 turns and is 2.250 km long. It is the only circuit on the calendar to feature old concrete that offers low grip and high tyre wear, as used in the airport, long turns, an indoor tunnel and a wide circuit.

The 2020 edition of the event was planned to have three doubleheader races, with each doubleheader being on a different circuit variation. One race ran on the normal layout, one on a reverse layout, and the final one ran with a changed section around turns 5 and 6. This was due to the COVID-19 pandemic that shut down Formula E between February and June.

=== Karl-Marx Allee/Strausberger Platz ===
Since Tempelhof Airport was used for housing refugees in 2016, a street circuit in downtown Berlin around Strausberger Platz was created for the 2016 Berlin ePrix. The circuit is 1.927 km in length and features 11 turns, with the pit lane located on Karl-Marx-Allee.

== Layout evolution ==
Track layouts
The layout used for the inaugural event in 2015 was much different than the other layouts of the Tempelhof Airport Street Circuit.

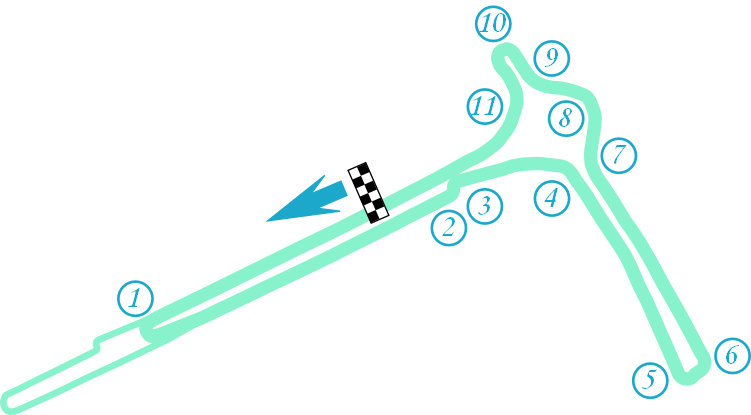
Berlin ePrix was held in another street circuit in Karl-Marx Allee in 2016.

The normal ePrix layout of the Tempelhof Airport Street Circuit (2017–2023)

The reverse ePrix layout of the Tempelhof Airport Street Circuit (2020–2022)

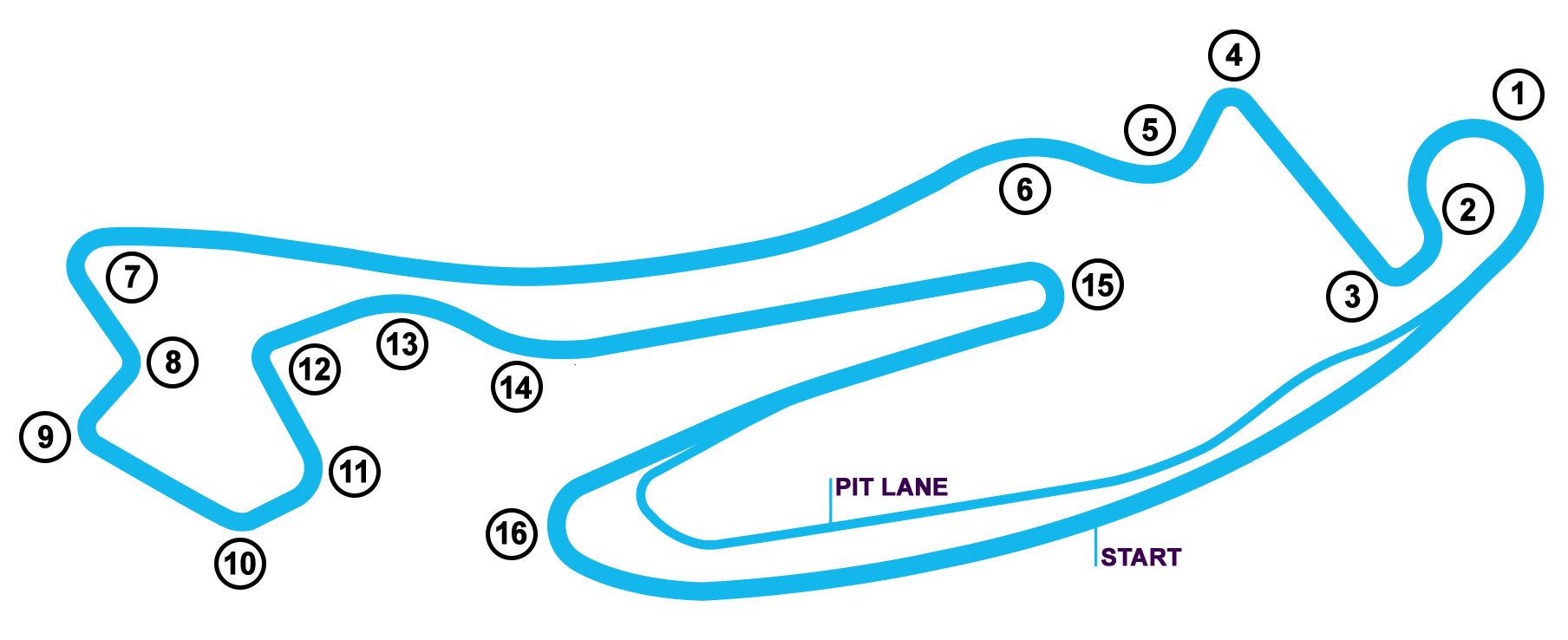
The extended ePrix layout of the Tempelhof Airport Street Circuit (2020)

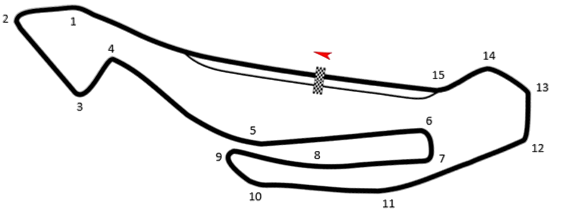
The ePrix layout of the Tempelhof Airport Street Circuit (2024–present)

== Results ==
| Edition | Track | Winner | Second | Third | Pole position | Fastest lap | Ref |
|---|---|---|---|---|---|---|---|
| 2015 | Tempelhof Airport | (Belgium) Jérôme d'Ambrosio; Dragon Racing | (Switzerland) Sébastien Buemi e.dams Renault | (France) Loïc Duval; Dragon Racing | (Italy) Jarno Trulli; Trulli | (Brazil) Nelson Piquet Jr. NEXTEV TCR | |
| 2016 | Karl-Marx-Allee Circuit | (Switzerland) Sébastien Buemi; Renault e.dams | (Germany) Daniel Abt; ABT Schaeffler Audi Sport | (Brazil) Lucas di Grassi; Audi Sport ABT | (France) Jean-Éric Vergne; DS Virgin Racing | (Brazil) Bruno Senna; Mahindra Racing | |
| 2017 Race 1 | Tempelhof Airport | (Sweden) Felix Rosenqvist; Mahindra Racing Formula E Team | (Brazil) Lucas di Grassi; ABT Schaeffler Audi Sport | (Germany) Nick Heidfeld; Mahindra Racing Formula E Team | (Brazil) Lucas di Grassi; ABT Schaeffler Audi Sport | (New Zealand) Mitch Evans; Panasonic Jaguar Racing | |
| 2017 Race 2 | Tempelhof Airport | (Switzerland) Sébastien Buemi; Renault e.dams | (Sweden) Felix Rosenqvist; Mahindra Racing Formula E Team | (Brazil) Lucas di Grassi; ABT Schaeffler Audi Sport | (Sweden) Felix Rosenqvist; Mahindra Racing Formula E Team | (Germany) Maro Engel; Venturi Formula E Team | |
| 2018 | Tempelhof Airport | (Germany) Daniel Abt; Audi Sport ABT Schaeffler | (Brazil) Lucas di Grassi; Audi Sport ABT Schaeffler | (France) Jean-Éric Vergne; Techeetah Formula E Team | (Germany) Daniel Abt; Audi Sport ABT Schaeffler | (Germany) Daniel Abt; Audi Sport ABT Schaeffler | |
| 2019 | Tempelhof Airport | (Brazil) Lucas di Grassi; Audi Sport ABT Schaeffler | (Switzerland) Sébastien Buemi; Nissan e.dams | (France) Jean-Éric Vergne; DS Techeetah Formula E Team | (Switzerland) Sébastien Buemi; Nissan e.dams | (Brazil) Lucas di Grassi; Audi Sport ABT Schaeffler | |
| 2020 Race 1 | Tempelhof Airport | (Portugal) António Félix da Costa; DS Techeetah Formula E Team | (Germany) André Lotterer; Porsche Formula E Team | (United Kingdom) Sam Bird; Envision Virgin Racing | (Portugal) António Félix da Costa; DS Techeetah Formula E Team | (Portugal) António Félix da Costa; DS Techeetah Formula E Team | |
| 2020 Race 2 | Tempelhof Airport | (Portugal) António Félix da Costa; DS Techeetah Formula E Team | (Switzerland) Sébastien Buemi; Nissan e.dams | (Brazil) Lucas di Grassi; Audi Sport ABT Schaeffler | (Portugal) António Félix da Costa; DS Techeetah Formula E Team | (Belgium) Stoffel Vandoorne; Mercedes-Benz EQ Formula E Team | |
| 2020 Race 3 | Tempelhof Airport | (Germany) Maximilian Günther; BMW i Andretti Motorsport | (Netherlands) Robin Frijns; Envision Virgin Racing | (France) Jean-Éric Vergne; DS Techeetah Formula E Team | (France) Jean-Éric Vergne; DS Techeetah Formula E Team | (New Zealand) Mitch Evans; Panasonic Jaguar Racing | |
| 2020 Race 4 | Tempelhof Airport | (France) Jean-Éric Vergne; DS Techeetah Formula E Team | (Portugal) António Félix da Costa; DS Techeetah Formula E Team | (Switzerland) Sébastien Buemi; Nissan e.dams | (France) Jean-Éric Vergne; DS Techeetah Formula E Team | (Portugal) António Félix da Costa; DS Techeetah Formula E Team | |
| 2020 Race 5 | Tempelhof Airport | (United Kingdom) Oliver Rowland; Nissan e.dams | (Netherlands) Robin Frijns; Envision Virgin Racing | (Germany) René Rast; Audi Sport ABT Schaeffler | (United Kingdom) Oliver Rowland; Nissan e.dams | (Brazil) Lucas di Grassi; Audi Sport ABT Schaeffler | |
| 2020 Race 6 | Tempelhof Airport | (Belgium) Stoffel Vandoorne; Mercedes-Benz EQ Formula E Team | (Netherlands) Nyck de Vries; Mercedes-Benz EQ Formula E Team | (Switzerland) Sébastien Buemi; Nissan e.dams | (Belgium) Stoffel Vandoorne; Mercedes-Benz EQ Formula E Team | (Switzerland) Nico Müller; GEOX Dragon | |
| 2021 Race 1 | Tempelhof Airport | (Brazil) Lucas di Grassi; Audi Sport ABT Schaeffler | (Switzerland) Edoardo Mortara; Venturi Formula E Team | (New Zealand) Mitch Evans; Panasonic Jaguar Racing | (France) Jean-Éric Vergne; DS Techeetah Formula E Team | (Germany) René Rast; Audi Sport ABT Schaeffler (Note: Rast received the point for fastest lap as Di Grassi failed to finish in the top 10.) | |
| 2021 Race 2 | Tempelhof Airport | (France) Norman Nato; Venturi Formula E Team | (United Kingdom) Oliver Rowland; Nissan e.dams | (Belgium) Stoffel Vandoorne; Mercedes-Benz EQ Formula E Team | (Belgium) Stoffel Vandoorne; Mercedes-Benz EQ Formula E Team | (Brazil) Lucas di Grassi; Audi Sport ABT Schaeffler | |
| 2022 Race 1 | Tempelhof Airport | (Switzerland) Edoardo Mortara; Venturi Formula E Team | (France) Jean-Éric Vergne; DS Techeetah Formula E Team | (Belgium) Stoffel Vandoorne; Mercedes-Benz EQ Formula E Team | (Switzerland) Edoardo Mortara; Venturi Formula E Team | (Brazil) Lucas di Grassi; Venturi Formula E Team | |
| 2022 Race 2 | Tempelhof Airport | (Netherlands) Nyck de Vries; Mercedes-Benz EQ Formula E Team | (Switzerland) Edoardo Mortara; Venturi Formula E Team | (Belgium) Stoffel Vandoorne; Mercedes-Benz EQ Formula E Team | (Switzerland) Edoardo Mortara; Venturi Formula E Team | (Switzerland) Edoardo Mortara; Venturi Formula E Team (Note: Mortara received the point for fastest lap as Cassidy failed to finish in the top 10.) | |
| 2023 Race 1 | Tempelhof Airport | (New Zealand) Mitch Evans; Jaguar TCS Racing | (United Kingdom) Sam Bird; Jaguar TCS Racing | (Germany) Maximilian Günther; Maserati MSG Racing | (Switzerland) Sébastien Buemi; Envision Racing | (United Kingdom) Jake Dennis; Avalanche Andretti Formula E Team (Note: Lotterer scored the point for fastest lap as Dennis failed to finish in the top 10.) | |
| 2023 Race 2 | Tempelhof Airport | (New Zealand) Nick Cassidy; Envision Racing | (United Kingdom) Jake Dennis; Avalanche Andretti Formula E Team | (France) Jean-Éric Vergne; DS Penske | (Netherlands) Robin Frijns; ABT CUPRA Formula E Team | (Switzerland) Sébastien Buemi; Envision Racing (Note: Günther received the point for fastest lap as Buemi failed to finish in the top 10.) | |
| 2024 Race 1 | Tempelhof Airport | (New Zealand) Nick Cassidy; Jaguar TCS Racing | (France) Jean-Éric Vergne; DS Penske | (United Kingdom) Oliver Rowland; Nissan Formula E Team | (Switzerland) Edoardo Mortara; Mahindra Racing Formula E Team | (France) Norman Nato; Andretti Formula E Team (Note: Cassidy received the point for fastest lap as Nato failed to finish in the top 10.) | |
| 2024 Race 2 | Tempelhof Airport | (Portugal) António Félix da Costa; TAG Heuer Porsche Formula E Team | (New Zealand) Nick Cassidy; Jaguar TCS Racing | (United Kingdom) Oliver Rowland; Nissan Formula E Team | (United Kingdom) Jake Dennis; Andretti Formula E Team | (France) Norman Nato; Andretti Formula E Team (Note: Cassidy received the point for fastest lap as Nato failed to finish in the top 10.) | |
| 2025 Race 1 | Tempelhof Airport | (New Zealand) Mitch Evans; Jaguar TCS Racing | (Germany) Pascal Wehrlein; TAG Heuer Porsche Formula E Team | (Switzerland) Edoardo Mortara; Mahindra Racing Formula E Team | (New Zealand) Mitch Evans; Jaguar TCS Racing | (Germany) Pascal Wehrlein; TAG Heuer Porsche Formula E Team | |
| 2025 Race 2 | Tempelhof Airport | (New Zealand) Nick Cassidy; Jaguar TCS Racing | (United Kingdom) Jake Dennis; Andretti Formula E Team | (France) Jean-Éric Vergne; DS Penske | (Germany) Pascal Wehrlein; TAG Heuer Porsche Formula E Team | (New Zealand) Nick Cassidy; Jaguar TCS Racing | |
| 2026 Race 1 | Tempelhof Airport | (Switzerland) Nico Müller; Porsche Formula E Team | (New Zealand) Nick Cassidy; Citroën Racing | (United Kingdom) Oliver Rowland; Nissan Formula E Team | (Switzerland) Edoardo Mortara; Mahindra Racing Formula E Team | (Germany) Pascal Wehrlein; Porsche Formula E Team | |
| 2026 Race 2 | Tempelhof Airport | (New Zealand) Mitch Evans; Jaguar TCS Racing | (United Kingdom) Oliver Rowland; Nissan Formula E Team | (Germany) Pascal Wehrlein; Porsche Formula E Team | (Germany) Pascal Wehrlein; Porsche Formula E Team | (United Kingdom) Oliver Rowland; Nissan Formula E Team | |

=== Repeat winners (drivers) ===
| Wins | Driver | Years won |
|---|---|---|
| 3 | (Portugal) António Félix da Costa | 2020 (Race 1), 2020 (Race 2), 2024 (Race 2) |
| 3 | (New Zealand) Nick Cassidy | 2023 (Race 2), 2024 (Race 1), 2025 (Race 2) |
| 3 | (New Zealand) Mitch Evans | 2023 (Race 1), 2025 (Race 1), 2026 (Race 2) |
| 2 | (Switzerland) Sébastien Buemi | 2016, 2017 (Race 2) |
| 2 | (Brazil) Lucas di Grassi | 2019, 2021 (Race 1) |

== Gallery ==
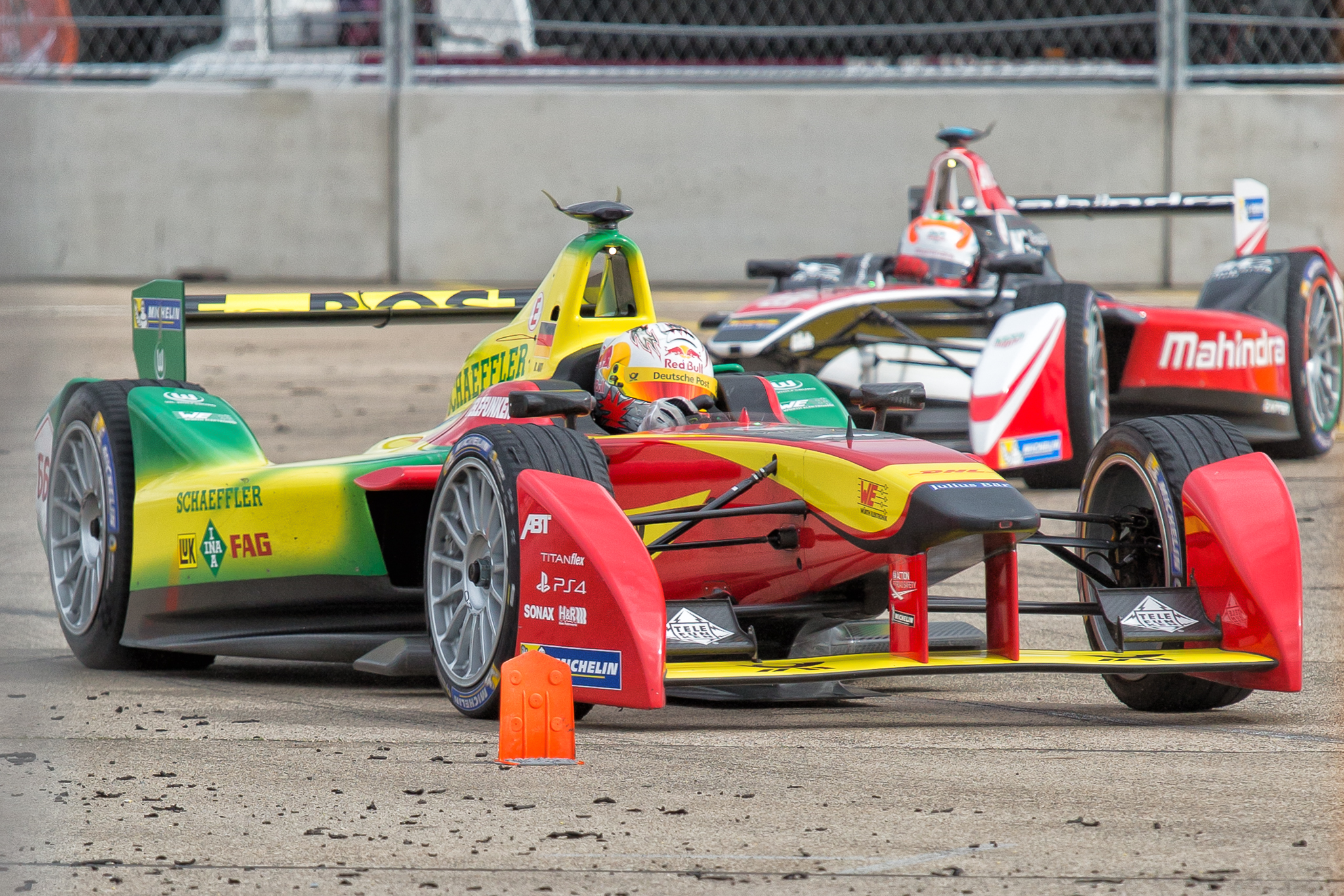
Daniel Abt in 2015.

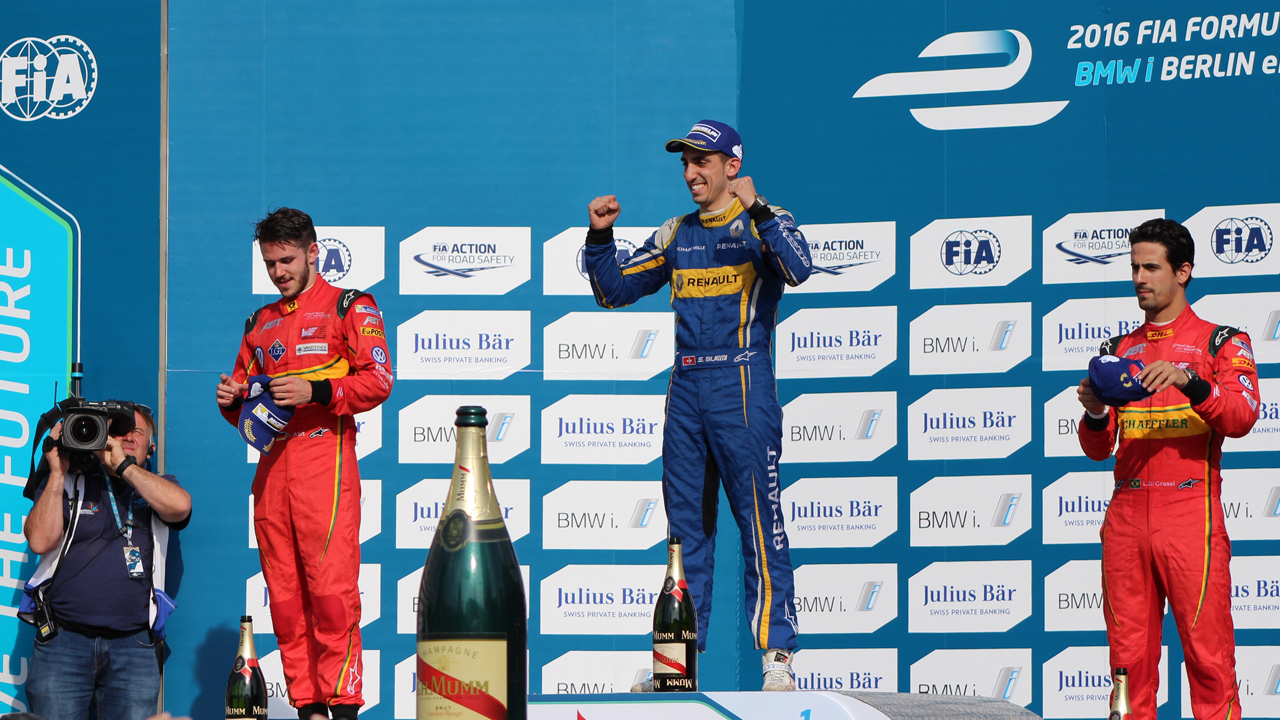
At the podium in 2016.

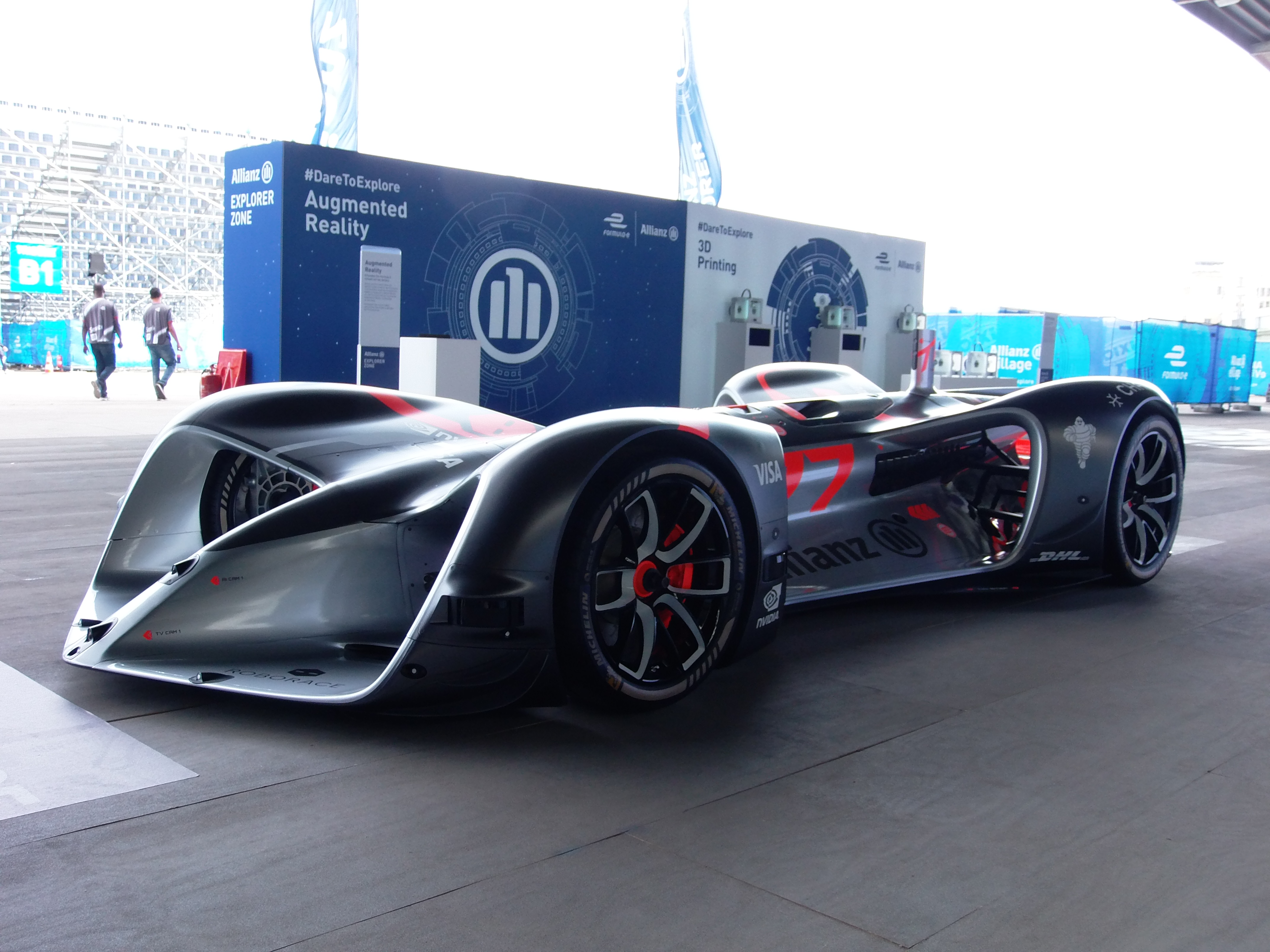
Roborace Showcar in 2017.

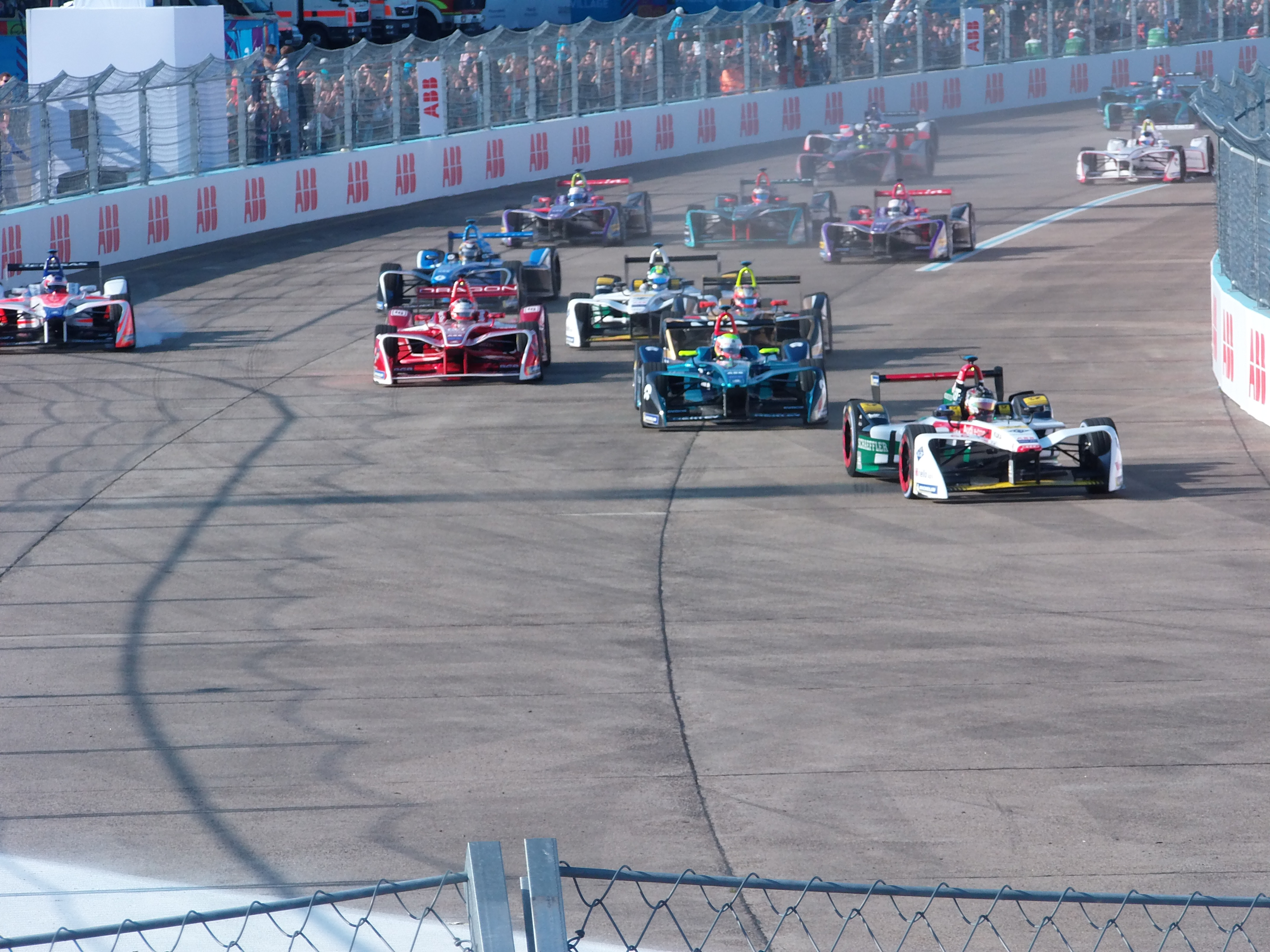
Race start in 2018.

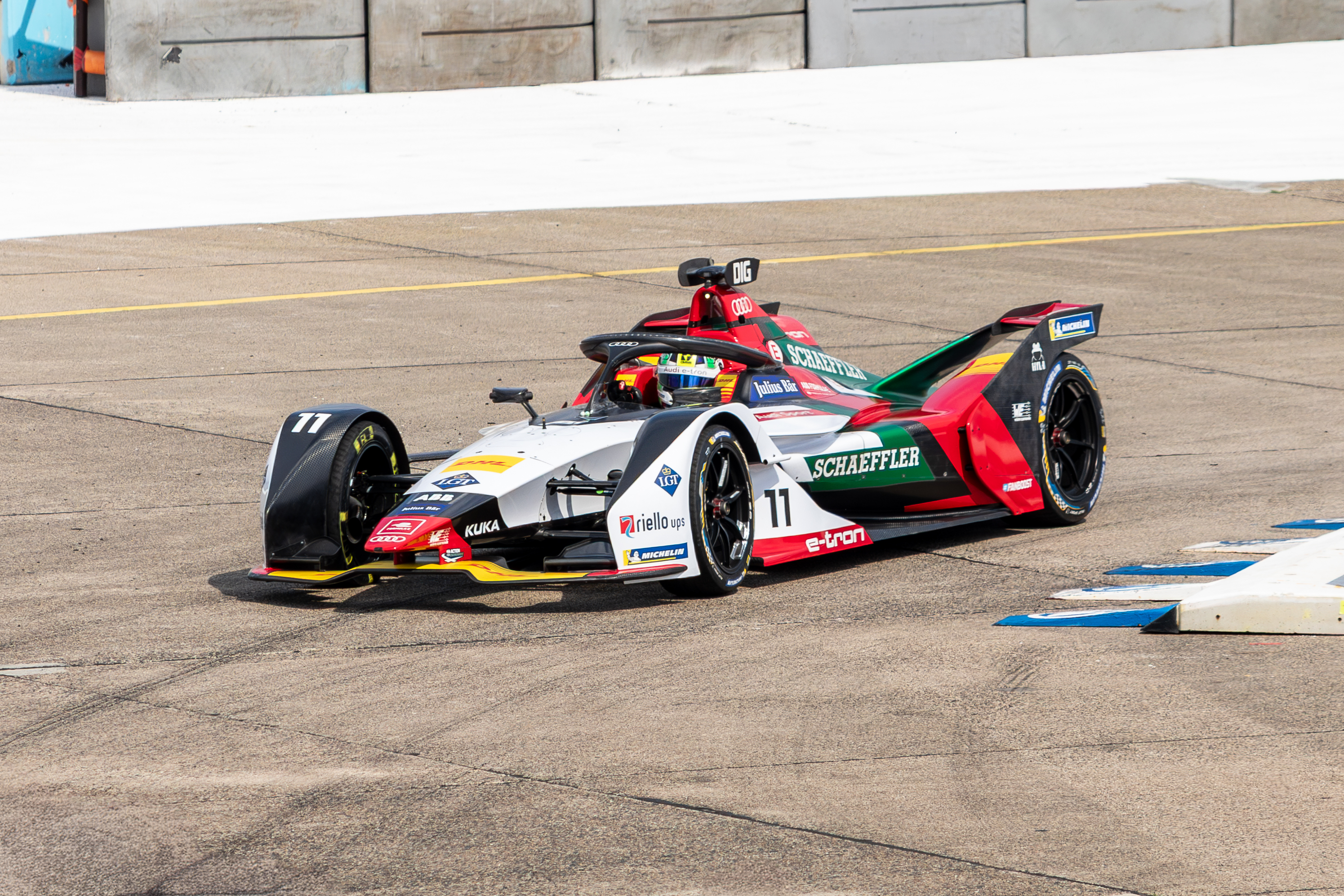
Lucas di Grassi in 2019.

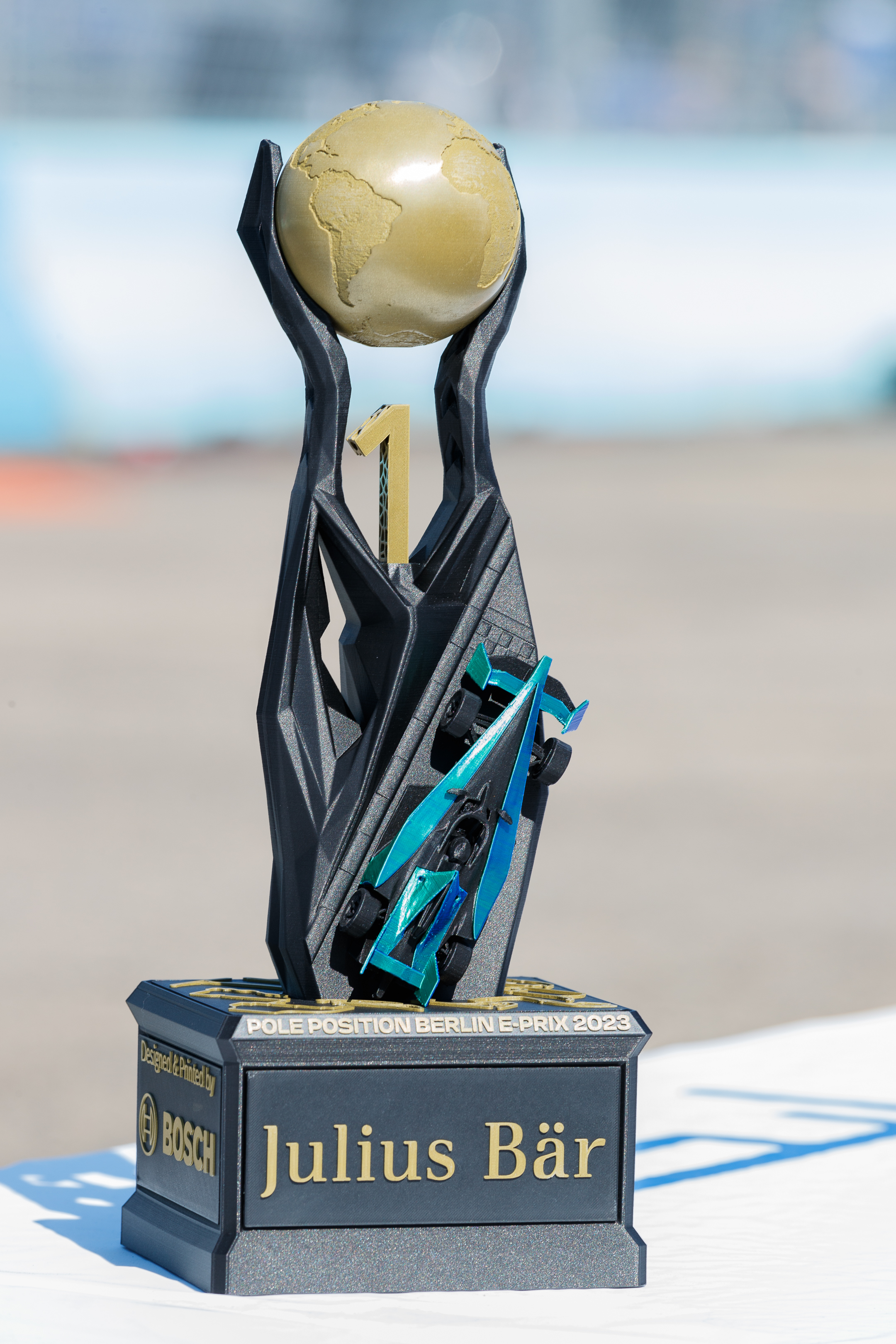
Berlin ePrix 2023 pole position trophy.

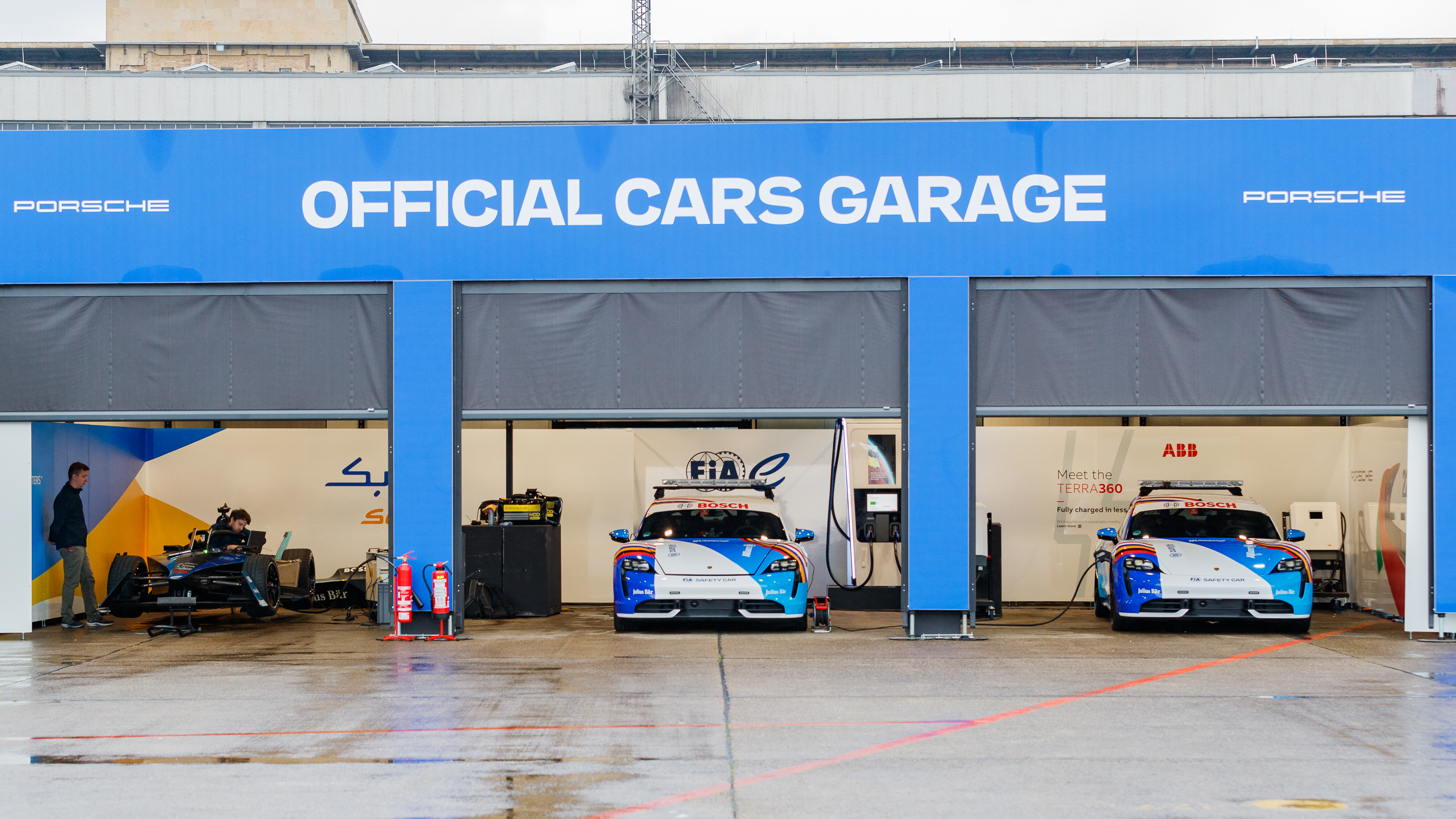
Safety car charging, 2023.

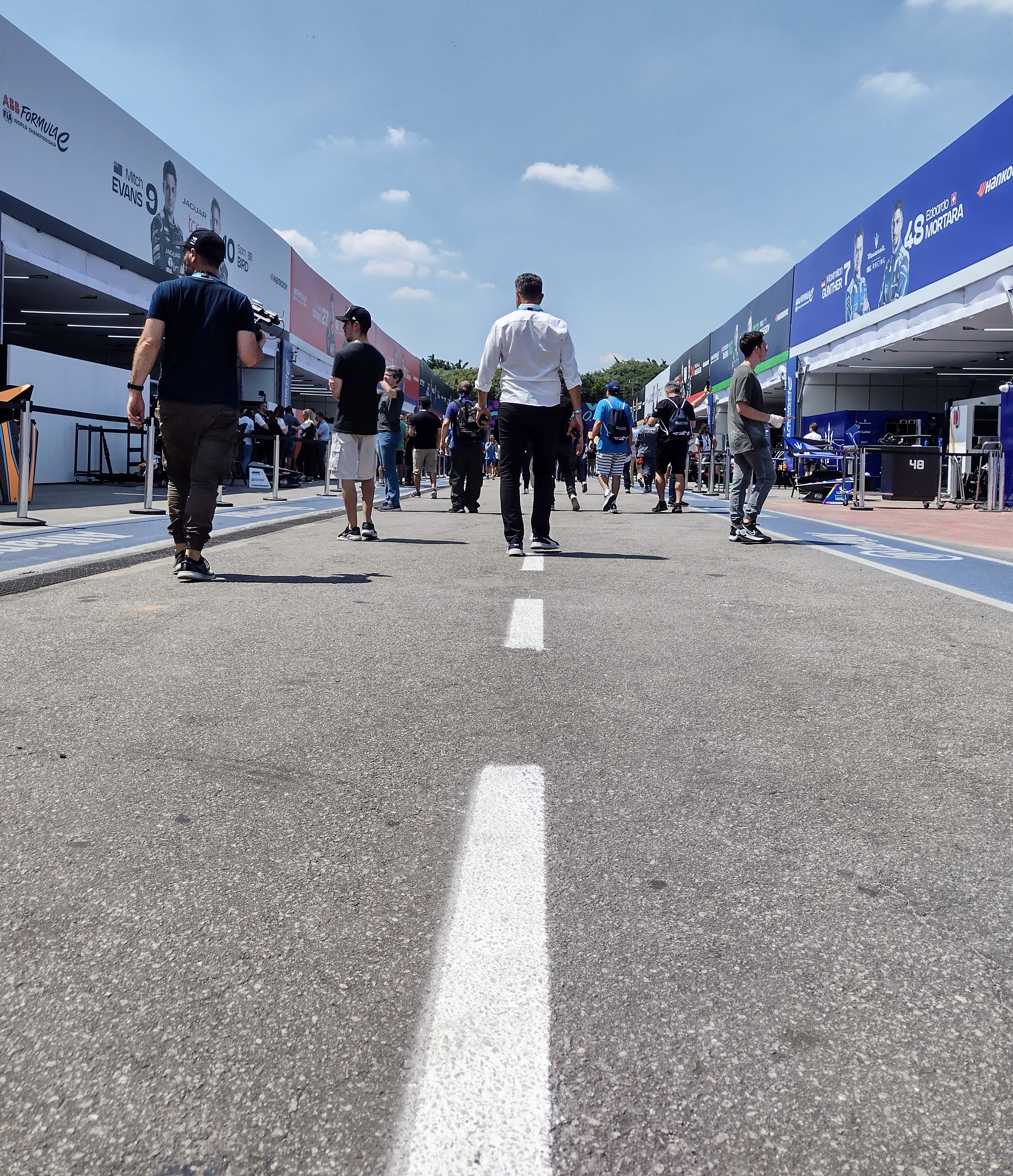
Paddock area, 2023.

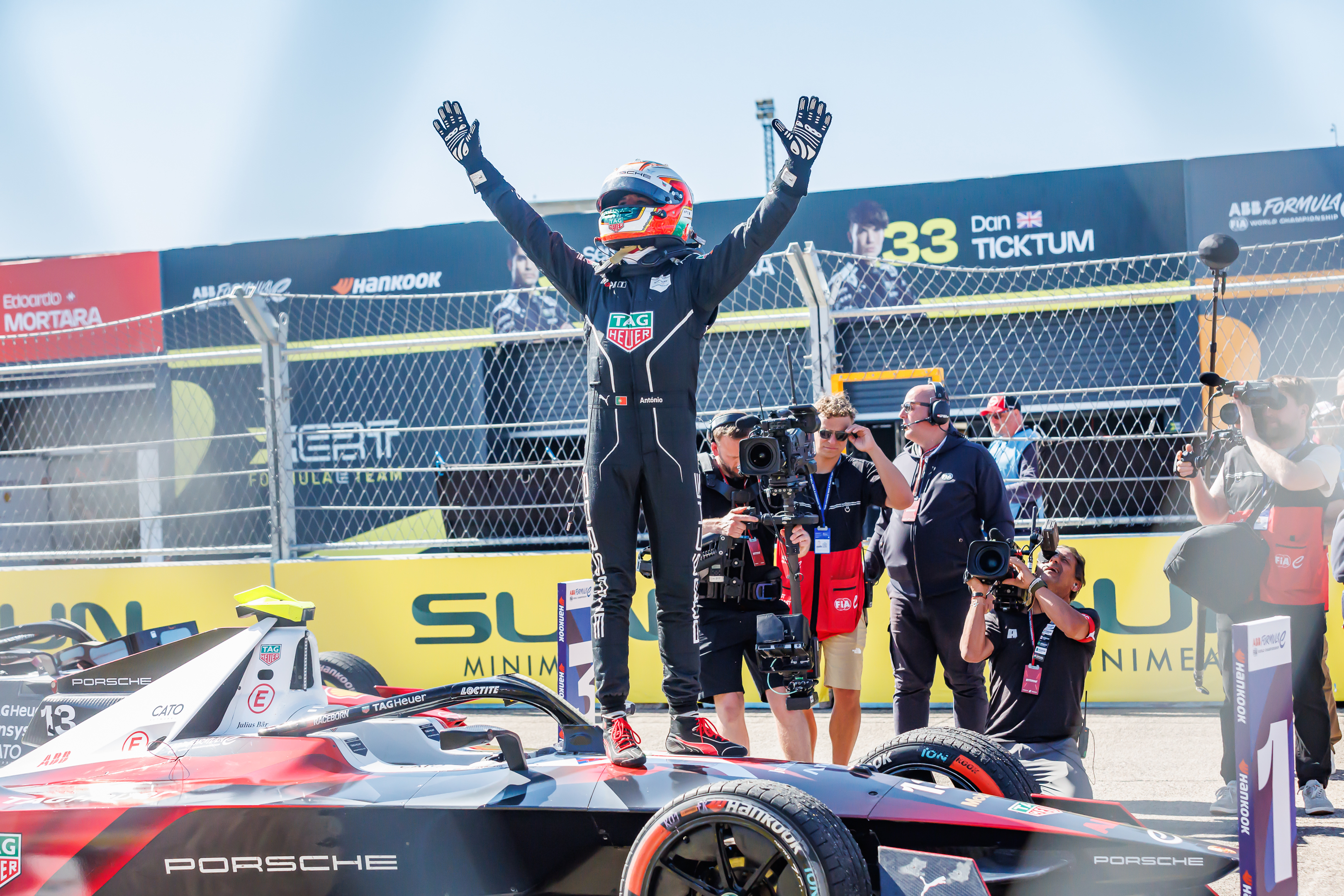
António Félix da Costa, 2024 post-race.

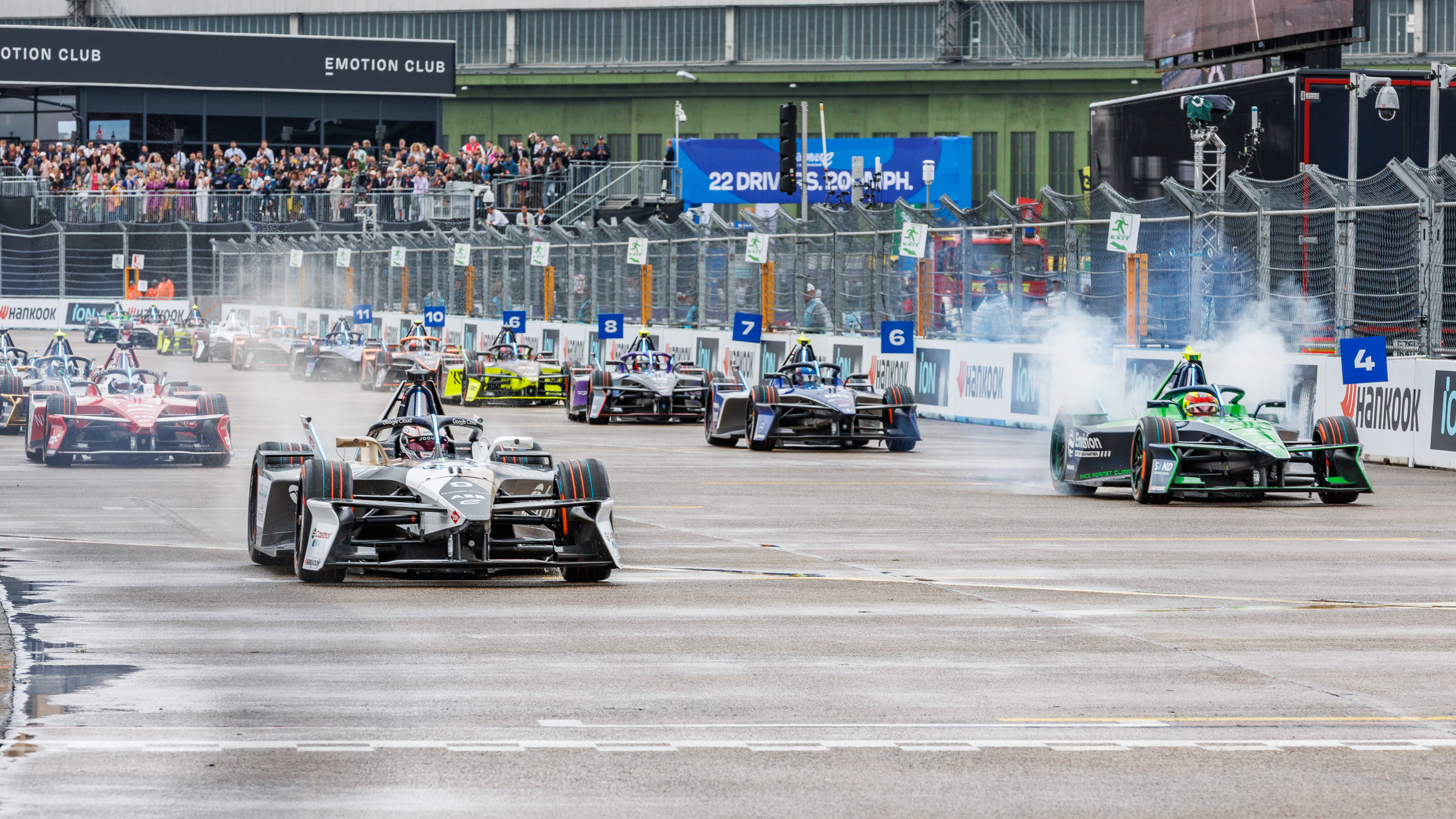
Race start in 2025.
